= List of Swedish films of the 1950s =

This is a list of films produced in Sweden and in the Swedish language in the 1950s.

== 1950 ==
English Title	Director	Cast	Genre	Swedish Title	Notes
Andersson's Kalle	Rolf Husberg	Kai Gullmar, Harriet Andersson, Rut Holm	Comedy	Anderssonskans Kalle	
Åsa-Nisse Goes Hunting	Ragnar Frisk	John Elfström, Artur Rolén, Emy Hagman	Comedy	Åsa-Nisse på jaktstigen	
Fiancée for Hire	Gustaf Molander	Olof Winnerstrand, Karl-Arne Holmsten, Eva Dahlbeck	Comedy	Fästmö uthyres	
Girl with Hyacinths	Hasse Ekman	Eva Henning, Ulf Palme, Anders Ek	Drama	Flicka och hyacinter	
Jack of Hearts	Hasse Ekman	Hans Strååt, Margareta Fahlén, Eva Dahlbeck	Drama	Hjärter Knekt	
The Kiss on the Cruise	Arne Mattsson	Annalisa Ericson, Gunnar Björnstrand, Karl-Arne Holmsten	Comedy	Kyssen på kryssen	
Knockout at the Breakfast Club	Gösta Bernhard	Sigge Fürst, Åke Söderblom, Irene Söderblom	Comedy	Stjärnsmäll i Frukostklubben	
The Motor Cavaliers	Elof Ahrle	Åke Söderblom, Viveca Serlachius, Sten Gester	Comedy	Motorkavaljerer	
My Sister and I	Schamyl Bauman	Sickan Carlsson, Gunnar Björnstrand	Comedy	Min syster och jag	
Perhaps a Gentleman	Ragnar Frisk	John Elfström, Stig Järrel, Marianne Löfgren	Comedy	Kanske en gentleman	
The Quartet That Split Up	Gustaf Molander	Adolf Jahr, Anita Björk, Inga Landgré	Comedy	Kvartetten som sprängdes	
The Realm of the Rye	Ivar Johansson	Eric Laurent, Peter Lindgren, Nine-Christine Jönsson	Drama	Rågens rike	
Restaurant Intim	Hampe Faustman	Birger Malmsten, Åke Grönberg, Mimi Nelson	Drama	Restaurant Intim	
The Saucepan Journey	Arne Mattsson	Eva Dahlbeck, Sigge Fürst, Edvin Adolphson	Comedy	Kastrullresan	
Teacher's First Born	Schamyl Bauman	Sickan Carlsson, Edvin Adolphson, Viveca Serlachius	Comedy	Frokens forsta barn	
This Can't Happen Here	Ingmar Bergman	Signe Hasso, Alf Kjellin, Ulf Palme	Drama	Sånt händer inte här	
To Joy	Ingmar Bergman	Maj-Britt Nilsson, Stig Olin, Birger Malmsten	Drama	Till glädje	
Two Stories Up	Gösta Werner	Gertrud Fridh, Bengt Eklund, Irma Christenson	Drama	Två trappor över gården	
When Love Came to the Village	Arne Mattsson	Sven Lindberg, Ruth Kasdan, Edvin Adolphson	Drama	När kärleken kom till byn	
While the City Sleeps	Lars-Eric Kjellgren	Sven-Eric Gamble, Inga Landgré, Adolf Jahr	Crime	Medan staden sover	
The White Cat	Hasse Ekman	Alf Kjellin, Eva Henning, Sture Lagerwall	Mystery	Den vita katten	

== 1951 ==
English Title	Director	Cast	Genre	Swedish Title	Notes
Beef and the Banana	Rolf Husberg	Åke Grönberg, Åke Söderblom, Lillebil Kjellén	Comedy	Biffen och Bananen	
Count Svensson	Emil A. Lingheim	Edvard Persson, Mim Persson, Barbro Hiort af Ornäs	Comedy	Greve Svensson	
Customs Officer Bom	Lars-Eric Kjellgren	Nils Poppe, Inga Landgré, Gunnar Björnstrand	Comedy	Tull-Bom	
Divorced	Gustaf Molander	Inga Tidblad, Alf Kjellin, Doris Svedlund	Drama	Frånskild	
A Ghost on Holiday	Gösta Bernhard	Stig Järrel, Ingrid Backlin, Sven Magnusson	Comedy	Spöke på Semester	
In the Arms of the Sea	Arne Mattsson	Alf Kjellin, Edvin Adolphson, Eva Dahlbeck	Drama	Bärande hav	
Miss Julie	Alf Sjöberg	Anita Björk, Ulf Palme, Märta Dorff	Drama	Fröken Julie	Won Palme d'Or ("Golden Palm") at the 1951 Cannes Film Festival (shared)
My Friend Oscar	Pierre Billon, Åke Ohberg	Åke Söderblom, Margareta Fahlén, Olof Winnerstrand	Comedy	Min vän Oscar	
My Name Is Puck	Schamyl Bauman	Sickan Carlsson, Karl-Arne Holmsten, Naima Wifstrand	Comedy	Puck heter jag	
One Summer of Happiness	Arne Mattson	Ulla Jacobsson, Folke Sundquist, Edvin Adolphson	Drama	Hon dansade en sommar	Won Golden Bear at the Berlin Film Festival, 1952
Living on 'Hope'	Göran Gentele	Meg Westergren, Ingrid Thulin, Per Oscarsson	Comedy	Leva på 'Hoppet'	Silver Bear winner at the 1st Berlin International Film Festival
Poker	Gösta Bernhard	Stig Järrel, Kenne Fant, Ingrid Backlin	Drama	Poker	
Skipper in Stormy Weather	Gunnar Olsson	Adolf Jahr, Elof Ahrle, Bengt Eklund	Comedy	Skeppare i blåsväder	
Summer Interlude	Ingmar Bergman	Maj-Britt Nilsson, Birger Malmsten, Annalisa Ericson	Drama	Sommarlek	
Stronger Than the Law	Arnold Sjöstrand	Margareta Fahlén, Bengt Logardt, Margit Carlqvist	Drama	Starkare än lagen	

== 1952 ==
English Title	Director	Cast	Genre	Swedish Title	Notes
Blondie, Beef and the Banana	Lars-Eric Kjellgren	Åke Grönberg, Åke Söderblom, Doris Svedlund	Comedy	Blondie Biffen och Bananen	Sequel
Bom the Flyer	Lars-Eric Kjellgren	Nils Poppe, Yvonne Lombard, Gerd Andersson	Comedy	Flyg-Bom	
The Clang of the Pick	Arne Mattsson	Victor Sjöström, Edvin Adolphson, Margit Carlqvist	Drama	Hård klang	
Classmates	Schamyl Bauman	Sickan Carlsson, Olof Winnerstrand, Stig Olin	Comedy	Klasskamrater	
Defiance	Gustaf Molander	Per Oscarsson, Harriet Andersson, Eva Dahlbeck	Drama	Trots	
Drömsemester	Gösta Bernhard	Dirch Passer, Alice Babs, Stig Järrel	Comedy		
Encounter with Life	Gösta Werner	Doris Svedlund, Per Oscarsson, Arnold Sjöstrand	Drama	Möte med livet	
The Firebird	Hasse Ekman	Tito Gobbi, Eva Henning, Georg Rydeberg	Musical	Eldfågeln	Co-production with Italy
For the Sake of My Intemperate Youth	Arne Mattson	Aino Taube, Georg Rydeberg, Nils Hallberg	Drama	För min heta ungdoms skull	Entered into the 1953 Cannes Film Festival
The Green Lift	Börje Larsson	Stig Järrel, Annalisa Ericson, Gunnar Björnstrand	Comedy	Oppåt med gröna hissen	
In Lilac Time	Ivar Johansson	Kenne Fant, Nine-Christine Jönsson, Gudrun Brost	Drama	När syrenerna blomma	
Kalle Karlsson of Jularbo	Ivar Johansson	Kenne Fant, Rut Holm, Ingrid Thulin	Drama	Kalle Karlsson från Jularbo	
Love	Gustaf Molander	Sven Lindberg, Doris Svedlund, Victor Sjöström	Drama	Karlek	
One Fiancée at a Time	Schamyl Bauman	Sickan Carlsson, Karl-Arne Holmsten, Edvin Adolphson	Comedy	En fästman i taget	
Say It with Flowers	Lars-Eric Kjellgren	Annalisa Ericson, Stig Järrel, Gunnar Björnstrand	Comedy	Säg det med blommor	
Secrets of Women	Ingmar Bergman	Anita Björk, Eva Dahlbeck, Maj-Britt Nilsson, Birger Malmsten, Gunnar Björnstrand	Comedy drama	Kvinnors väntan	
She Came Like the Wind	Hampe Faustman	Åke Grönberg, Margit Carlqvist, Britta Brunius	Drama	Hon kom som en vind	
U-Boat 39	Hampe Faustman	Eva Dahlbeck, Karl-Arne Holmsten, Gunnel Broström	Drama	Ubåt 39	

== 1953 ==
English Title	Director	Cast	Genre	Swedish Title	Notes
Åsa-Nisse on Holiday	Ragnar Frisk	John Elfström, Helga Brofeldt, Artur Rolén	Comedy	Åsa-Nisse på semester	
Barabbas	Alf Sjöberg	Ulf Palme, Georg Årlin, Eva Dahlbeck	Drama	Barabbas	Entered into the 1953 Cannes Film Festival
The Beat of Wings in the Night	Kenne Fant	Edvin Adolphson, Erik Berglund, Naima Wifstrand	Drama	Vingslag i natten	
Bread of Love	Arne Mattsson	Folke Sundquist, Georg Rydeberg, Nils Hallberg	Drama	Kärlekens bröd	Entered into the 1954 Cannes Film Festival
The Chieftain of Göinge	Åke Ohberg	Edvin Adolphson, Alf Kjellin, Eva Dahlbeck	Historical	Göingehövdingen	
Dance, My Doll	Martin Söderhjelm	Nils Poppe, Adolf Jahr, Inga Landgré	Comedy	Dansa, min docka	
The Girl from Backafall	Bror Bügler	Sven Lindberg, Kenne Fant, Edvard Persson	Drama	Flickan från Backafall	
The Glass Mountain	Gustaf Molander	Hasse Ekman, Eva Henning, Gunn Wållgren	Drama	Glasberget	
The Great Adventure	Arne Sucksdorff	Gunnar Sjöberg, Arne Sucksdorff, Anders Nohrborg	Drama	Det stora äventyret	Entered into Cannes and Berlin
Hidden in the Fog	Lars-Eric Kjellgren	Eva Henning, Sonja Wigert, Hjördis Petterson	Mystery	I dimma dold	
House of Women	Hampe Faustman	Inga Tidblad, Eva Dahlbeck, Annalisa Ericson	Drama	Kvinnohuset	
Marianne	Egil Holmsen	Margit Carlqvist, Gunnar Hellström, Eva Stiberg	Drama	Marianne	
A Night in the Archipelago	Bengt Logardt	Ingrid Thulin, Bengt Blomgren, Öllegård Wellton	Drama	En skärgårdsnatt	
No Man's Woman	Lars-Eric Kjellgren	Alf Kjellin, Birger Malmsten, Ann-Marie Gyllenspetz	Drama	Ingen mans kvinna	
The Road to Klockrike	Gunnar Skoglund	Anders Ek, Edvin Adolphson, Annika Tretow	Drama	Vägen till Klockrike	
Sawdust and Tinsel	Ingmar Bergman	Åke Grönberg, Harriet Andersson, Hasse Ekman	Drama	Gycklarnas afton	
The Shadow	Kenne Fant	Georg Rydeberg, Eva Dahlbeck, Hugo Björne	Drama	Skuggan	
Speed Fever	Egil Holmsen	Arne Ragneborn, Sven-Axel Carlsson, Erik Berglund	Drama	Fartfeber	
Stupid Bom	Nils Poppe	Nils Poppe, Inga Landgré, Hjördis Petterson	Comedy	Dumbom	
Summer with Monika	Ingmar Bergman	Harriet Anderson, Lars Ekborg, John Harryson	Drama	Sommaren med Monika	
Unmarried Mothers	Bengt Logardt	Eva Stiberg, Bengt Logardt, Öllegård Wellton	Drama	Ogift fader sökes	
Ursula, the Girl from the Finnish Forests	Ivar Johansson	Eva Stiberg, Birger Malmsten, Naima Wifstrand	Drama	Ursula - Flickan i Finnskogarna	
We Three Debutantes	Hasse Ekman	Maj-Britt Nilsson, Sven-Eric Gamble	Drama	Vi tre debutera	

== 1954 ==
English Title	Director	Cast	Genre	Swedish Title	Notes
Café Lunchrasten	Hampe Faustman	Lars Ekborg, Doris Svedlund, Annalisa Ericson	Drama	Café Lunchrasten	
Dance on Roses	Schamyl Bauman	Sickan Carlsson, Karl-Arne Holmsten, Olof Winnerstrand	Comedy drama	Dans på rosor	
Dance in the Smoke	Bengt Blomgren	Martin Ljung, Annalisa Ericson, Stig Järrel	Comedy	I rök och dans	
Enchanted Walk	Arne Mattsson	Folke Sundquist, Elsa Prawitz, Edvin Adolphson	Drama	Förtrollad vandring	
Gabrielle	Hasse Ekman	Eva Henning, Birger Malmsten, Inga Tidblad	Drama	Gabrielle	
Girl Without a Name	Torgny Wickman	Alf Kjellin, Berit Frodi, Torsten Lilliecrona, Stig Järrel	Crime	Flicka utan namn	
Karin Månsdotter	Alf Sjoberg	Ulla Jacobsson, Jarl Kulle, Ulf Palme	Historical	Karin Månsdotter	
Laugh Bomb	Börje Larsson	Gus Dahlström, Holger Höglund, Karl-Arne Holmsten	Comedy	Skrattbomben	
A Lesson in Love	Ingmar Bergman	Eva Dahlbeck, Gunnar Björnstrand, Harriet Andersson	Drama	En lektion i kärlek	
A Night at Glimmingehus	Torgny Wickman	Edvard Persson, Bibi Andersson, Bengt Logardt	Comedy	En natt på Glimmingehus	
Our Father and the Gypsy	Hampe Faustman	Ulf Palme, Adolf Jahr, Doris Svedlund	Drama	Gud Fader och tattaren	
The Red Horses	Ivar Johansson	Jan-Erik Lindqvist, Rut Holm, Artur Rolén	Drama	De röda hästarna	
Salka Valka	Arne Mattsson	Gunnel Broström, Folke Sundquist, Margaretha Krook	Drama	Salka Valka	
Simon the Sinner	Gunnar Hellström	Gunnar Hellström, Ann-Marie Gyllenspetz, Stig Järrel	Drama	Simon syndaren	
Sir Arne's Treasure	Gustaf Molander	Ulla Jacobsson, Ulf Palme, Bengt Eklund	Drama	Herr Arnes penningar	
Storm over Tjurö	Arne Mattsson	Adolf Jahr, Sigge Fürst, Gunnel Broström	Drama	Storm över Tjurö	
Taxi 13	Börje Larsson	Elof Ahrle, Signe Hasso, Margit Carlqvist	Drama	Taxi 13	
Time of Desire	Egil Holmsen	Barbro Larsson, Margaretha Löwler, George Fant	Drama	Hästhandlarens flickor	
The Vicious Breed	Arne Ragneborn	Arne Ragneborn, Carl-Olof Alm, Sif Ruud	Drama	Farlig frihet	
The Yellow Squadron	Stig Olin	Hasse Ekman, Ann-Marie Gyllenspetz, Sven Lindberg	Drama	Gula divisionen	
Young Summer	Kenne Fant	Edvin Adolphson, Lennart Lindberg, Dagmar Ebbesen	Drama	Ung sommar	

== 1955 ==
English Title	Director	Cast	Genre	Swedish Title	Notes
Blue Sky	Georg Årlin	Edvard Persson, Ingeborg Nyberg, Barbro Larsson	Comedy	Blå himmel	
The Dance Hall	Börje Larsson	Elof Ahrle, Sonja Wigert, Lars Ekborg	Drama	Danssalongen	
Darling of Mine	Schamyl Bauman	Sickan Carlsson, Karl-Arne Holmsten, Erik Berglund	Comedy	Älskling på vågen	
Dreams	Ingmar Bergman	Eva Dahlbeck, Harriet Andersson, Gunnar Björnstrand	Drama	Kvinnodröm	
Getting Married	Anders Henrikson	Anita Björk, Elsa Carlsson, Edvin Adolphson	Drama	Giftas	
The Girl in the Rain	Alf Kjellin	Marianne Bengtsson, Annika Tretow, Gunnel Lindblom	Drama	Flickan i regnet	
The Light from Lund	Hans Lagerkvist	Nils Poppe, Ann-Marie Gyllenspetz, Karl-Arne Holmsten	Comedy	Ljuset från Lund	
The Magnificent Lie	Mike Road	Signe Hasso, Mike Road, Stig Olin	Drama	Den underbara lögnen	
Men in the Dark	Arne Mattsson	Elof Ahrle, Sigge Fürst, Sven Lindberg	Drama	Männen i mörker	
Paradise	Arne Ragneborn	Edvin Adolphson, Gunnel Broström, Eva Dahlbeck	Drama	Paradiset	
The People of Hemsö	Arne Mattsson	Erik Strandmark, Hjördis Petterson, Nils Hallberg	Drama	Hemsöborna	
People of the Finnish Forests	Ivar Johansson	Birger Malmsten, Kerstin Wibom, Adolf Jahr	Drama	Finnskogens folk	
Smiles of a Summer Night	Ingmar Bergman	Ulla Jacobsson, Eva Dahlbeck, Harriet Andersson, Margit Carlqvist	Comedy	Sommarnattens leende	Cannes Award
The Summer Wind Blows	Åke Ohberg	Lars Nordrum, Margit Carlqvist, Edvin Adolphson	Drama	Ute blåser sommarvind	
Uncle's	Hans Lagerkvist	Nils Poppe, Ann-Marie Gyllenspetz, Holger Löwenadler	Comedy	Stampen	
The Unicorn	Gustaf Molander	Inga Tidblad, Birger Malmsten, Edvin Adolphson	Drama	Enhörningen	
Violence	Lars-Eric Kjellgren	Lars Ekborg, Doris Svedlund, Gunvor Pontén	Drama	Våld	
Voyage in the Night	Hampe Faustman	George Fant, Eva Dahlbeck, Ulla Sallert	Drama	Resa i natten	
Whoops!	Stig Olin	Povel Ramel, Harriet Andersson, Sven Lindberg	Comedy	Hoppsan!	
Wild Birds	Alf Sjoberg	Maj-Britt Nilsson, Per Oscarsson, Ulla Sjöblom	Drama	Vildfåglar	

== 1956 ==
English Title	Director	Cast	Genre	Swedish Title	Notes
The Biscuit	Hans Lagerkvist	Nils Poppe, Marianne Bengtsson, Holger Löwenadler	Comedy	Skorpan	
A Doll's House	Anders Henrikson	Mai Zetterling, Gunnel Broström, George Fant	Drama	Ett dockhem	
The Girl in Tails	Arne Mattsson	Maj-Britt Nilsson, Folke Sundquist, Anders Henrikson	Comedy	Flickan i frack	
Girls Without Rooms	Arne Ragneborn	Catrin Westerlund, Inga Gill, Marianne Löfgren	Drama	Flamman	
The Hard Game	Lars-Eric Kjellgren	Sven-Eric Gamble, Ann-Marie Gyllenspetz, Åke Grönberg	Sports	Den hårda leken	
Last Pair Out	Alf Sjöberg	Eva Dahlbeck, Harriet Andersson, Bibi Andersson	Drama	Sista paret ut	Entered into the 7th Berlin International Film Festival
Laughing in the Sunshine	Daniel Birt	Jane Hylton, Bengt Logardt, Adolf Jahr	Drama	Ett kungligt äventyr	Co-production with UK
A Little Nest	Arne Mattsson	Maj-Britt Nilsson, Folke Sundquist, Edvin Adolphson	Comedy	Litet bo	
Moon Over Hellesta	Rolf Husberg	Anita Björk, Birger Malmsten, Doris Svedlund	Thriller	Moln över Hellesta	
My Passionate Longing	Bengt Logardt	Margit Carlqvist, Alf Kjellin, Karl-Arne Holmsten	Drama	Het är min längtan	
Night Child	Gunnar Hellström	Harriet Andersson, Erik Strandmark, Nils Hallberg	Crime	Nattbarn	
Seventh Heaven	Hasse Ekman	Sickan Carlsson, Gunnar Björnstrand, Stig Järrel	Comedy	Sjunde himlen	
The Song of the Scarlet Flower	Gustaf Molander	Jarl Kulle, Anita Björk, Ulla Jacobsson	Drama	Sången om den eldröda blomman	
The Staffan Stolle Story	Hasse Ekman	Povel Ramel, Martin Ljung, Yvonne Lombard	Musical	Ratataa eller The Staffan Stolle Story	
Stage Entrance	Bengt Ekerot	Edvin Adolphson, Margit Carlqvist, Gio Petré	Drama	Sceningång	
The Stranger from the Sky	Rolf Husberg	Marianne Bengtsson, Alf Kjellin, Georg Funkquist	Thriller	Främlingen från skyn	
When the Mills are Running	Bengt Järrel	Edvard Persson, Ingeborg Nyberg, Börje Mellvig	Comedy	Där möllorna gå	

== 1957 ==
English Title	Director	Cast	Genre	Swedish Title	Notes
Blonde in Bondage	Robert Brandt	Mark Miller, Anita Thallaug, Lars Ekborg	Thriller	Blondin i fara	
A Dreamer's Journey	Lars-Magnus Lindgren	Jarl Kulle, Margit Carlqvist, Inga Landgré	Biopic	En drömmares vandring	
Encounters in the Twilight	Alf Kjellin	Eva Dahlbeck, Åke Grönberg, Ann-Marie Gyllenspetz	Drama	Moten i skymningen	
The Flute and the Arrow	Arne Sucksdorff		Documentary	En Djungelsaga	Entered into the 1958 Cannes Film Festival
A Guest in His Own House	Stig Olin	Anita Björk, Lars Ekborg, Alf Kjellin	Drama	Gäst i eget hus	
The Halo Is Slipping	Hasse Ekman	Sickan Carlsson, Sture Lagerwall, Yvonne Lombard	Comedy	Med glorian på sned	
The Minister of Uddarbo	Kenne Fant	Max von Sydow, Ann-Marie Gyllenspetz, Anders Henrikson	Drama	Prästen i Uddarbo	
Mother Takes a Vacation	Schamyl Bauman	Gerd Hagman, George Fant, Karl-Arne Holmsten	Comedy	Mamma tar semester	
Never in Your Life	Arne Ragneborn	Lars Ekborg, Ingrid Thulin, Sven-Eric Gamble	Drama	Aldrig i livet	
Night Light	Lars-Eric Kjellgren	Marianne Bengtsson, Lars Ekborg, Gunnar Björnstrand	Comedy	Nattens ljus	
No Tomorrow	Arne Mattsson	Jarl Kulle, Margit Carlqvist, Kolbjörn Knudsen	Drama	Ingen morgondag	
Seventeen Years Old	Alf Kjellin	Ingeborg Nyberg, Randi Kolstad, Isa Quensel	Drama	Sjutton år	
The Seventh Seal	Ingmar Bergman	Max von Sydow, Gunnar Björnstrand, Bibi Andersson	Drama	Det sjunde inseglet	Won Special Jury Prize at the Cannes Film Festival, 1957; among the films considered the greatest ever
Spring of Life	Arne Mattsson	Nicole Berger, Folke Sundquist, Pedro Laxalt	Drama	Livets vår	Co-production with Argentina
Summer Place Wanted	Hasse Ekman	Eva Dahlbeck, Gunnar Björnstrand, Bibi Andersson	Comedy	Sommarnöje sökes	Entered into the 1st Moscow International Film Festival
Synnöve Solbakken	Gunnar Hellström	Harriet Andersson, Edvin Adolphson, Bengt Brunskog	Drama	Synnöve Solbakken	
Wild Strawberries	Ingmar Bergman	Victor Sjöström, Ingrid Thulin, Bibi Andersson	Drama	Smultronstället	Won the Golden Bear for Best Film at the 8th Berlin International Film Festival; nominated for an Academy Award for Writing Original Screenplay

== 1958 ==
English Title	Director	Cast	Genre	Swedish Title	Notes
Åsa-Nisse in Military Uniform	Ragnar Frisk	John Elfström, Artur Rolén, Brita Öberg	Comedy	Åsa-Nisse i kronans kläder	
Brink of Life	Ingmar Bergman	Eva Dahlbeck, Ingrid Thulin, Bibi Andersson	Drama	Nära livet	Cannes Awards
A Difficult Parish	Emil A. Lingheim	Knut Borglin, Hans Alfredson, Åke Ohlmarks	Comedy	Ett svarskott pastorat	
Fridolf Stands Up!	Torgny Anderberg	Douglas Håge, Hjördis Petterson, Lars Ekborg	Comedy	Fridolf sticker opp!	
A Goat in the Garden	Gösta Folke	Edvin Adolphson, Gunnel Broström, Eva Stiberg	Comedy	Bock i örtagård	
The Great Amateur	Hasse Ekman	Martin Ljung, Marianne Bengtsson, Yngve Gamlin	Comedy	Den store amatören	
The Jazz Boy	Hasse Ekman	Maj-Britt Nilsson, Hasse Ekman, Elof Ahrle	Comedy	Jazzgossen	
The Koster Waltz	Rolf Husberg	Egon Larsson, Åke Söderblom, Yvonne Lombard	Romance	Kostervalsen	
The Lady in Black	Arne Mattsson	Anita Björk, Annalisa Ericson, Karl-Arne Holmsten	Mystery	Damen i svart	
Laila	Rolf Husberg	Erika Remberg, Edvin Adolphson, Isa Quensel	Drama	Laila	Co-production with West Germany
Line Six	Bengt Blomgren	Margit Carlqvist, Åke Grönberg, Inger Juel	Drama	Linje sex	
The Magician	Ingmar Bergman	Ingrid Thulin, Max von Sydow, Bibi Andersson, Erland Josephson	Drama	Ansiktet	
Mannequin in Red	Arne Mattsson	Karl-Arne Holmsten, Annalisa Ericson, Anita Björk	Thriller	Mannekäng i rött	
Miss April	Göran Gentele	Gunnar Björnstrand, Lena Söderblom, Jarl Kulle	Comedy	Fröken April	Entered into the 1959 Cannes Film Festival
More Than a Match for the Navy	Stig Olin	Nils Poppe, Harriet Andersson, Yvonne Lombard	Comedy	Flottans överman	
Music Aboard	Sven Lindberg	Alice Babs, Sven Lindberg, Lena Nyman	Comedy	Musik ombord	
The Phantom Carriage	Arne Mattsson	Edvin Adolphson, Anita Björk, Ulla Jacobsson	Horror	Körkarlen	Entered into the 9th Berlin International Film Festival
Playing on the Rainbow	Lars-Eric Kjellgren	Mai Zetterling, Alf Kjellin, Birger Malmsten	Drama	Lek på regnbågen	
We at Väddö	Arthur Spjuth	Ann-Marie Gyllenspetz, Bengt Brunskog, Karl-Arne Holmsten	Drama	Vi på Väddö	
Woman in a Fur Coat	Jan Molander	Harriet Andersson, Ulf Palme, Erik Strandmark	Thriller	Kvinna i leopard	
You Are My Adventure	Stig Olin	Sickan Carlsson, Gunnar Björnstrand, Bibi Andersson	Comedy	Du är mitt äventyr	

== 1959 ==
English Title	Director	Cast	Genre	Swedish Title	Notes
The Beloved Game	Kenne Fant	Bibi Andersson, Sven Lindberg, Lars Ekborg	Comedy	Den kara leken	
Crime in Paradise	Lars-Eric Kjellgren	Harriet Andersson, Gunnar Björnstrand, Karl-Arne Holmsten	Thriller	Brott i paradiset	
Heaven and Pancake	Hasse Ekman	Sickan Carlsson, Hasse Ekman, Gunnar Björnstrand	Comedy	Himmel och pannkaka	
A Lion in Town	Gösta Folke	Nils Poppe, Ann-Marie Gyllenspetz, Herman Ahlsell	Comedy	Lejon på stan	
No Time to Kill	Tom Younger	John Ireland, Birgitta Andersson, Ellen Schwiers	Thriller	Med mord i bagaget	
Only a Waiter	Alf Kjellin	Nils Poppe, Marianne Bengtsson, Git Gay	Comedy	Bara en kypare	
Pirates on the Mälaren	Per G. Holmgren	Carl-Åke Eriksson, Gunnar Björnstrand, Åke Grönberg	Drama	Mälarpirater	
Rider in Blue	Arne Mattsson	Annalisa Ericson, Gunnel Broström, Bengt Brunskog	Mystery	Ryttare i blått	
Swinging at the Castle	Alf Kjellin	Alice Babs, Sven Lindberg, Yvonne Lombard	Comedy	Det svänger på slottet	
Thief in the Bedroom	Göran Gentele	Jarl Kulle, Gaby Stenberg, Lena Söderblom	Comedy	Sängkammartjuven	Entered into the 10th Berlin International Film Festival

== See also ==
- List of Danish films of the 1950s
