= Torsten Lilliecrona =

Swedish actor (1921–1999)

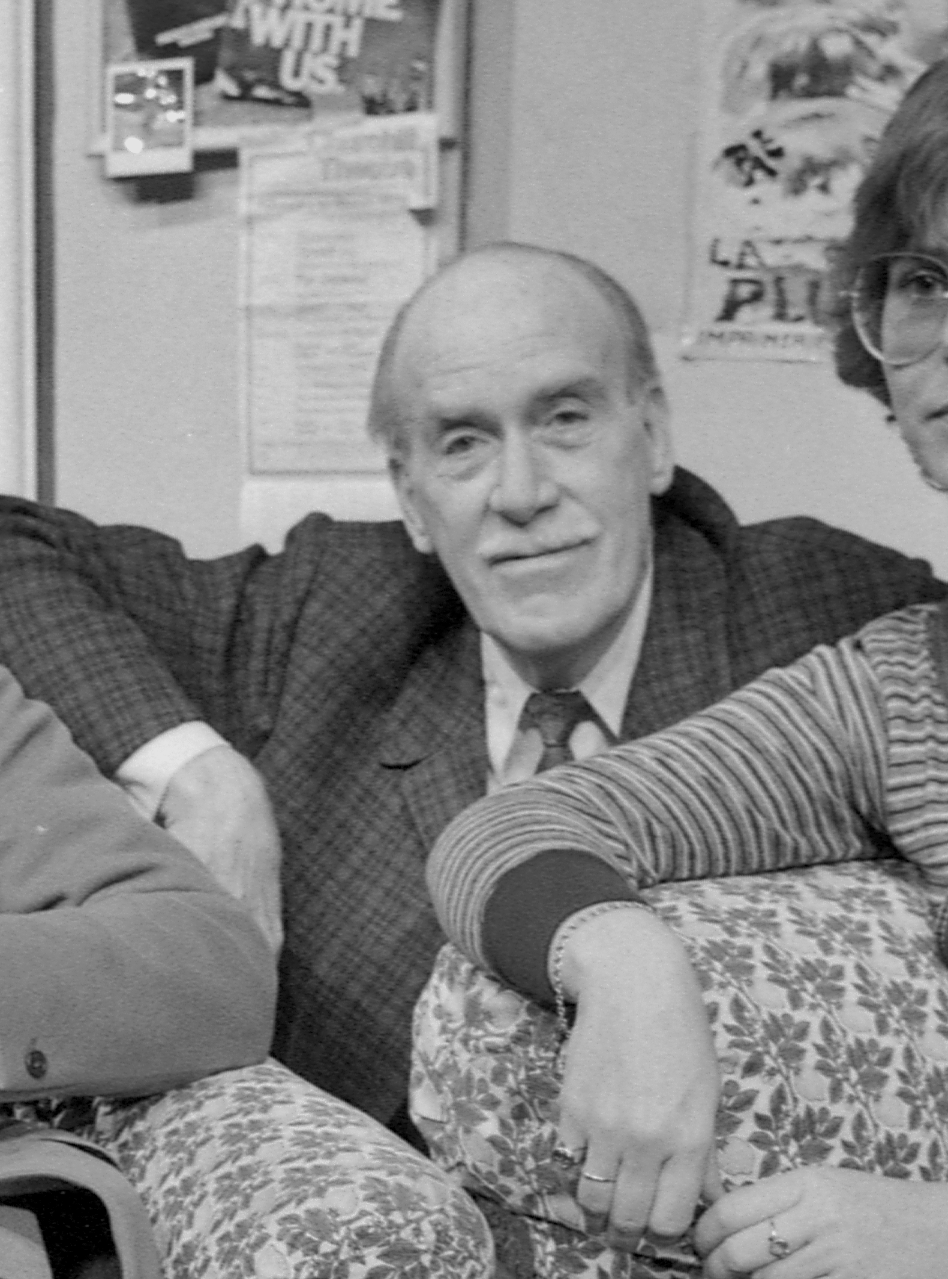
- Lilliecrona in 1980
- Born: Torsten Casimir Wilhelm Florusson Lilliecrona; 4 January 1921; Jönköping, Sweden
- Died: 15 October 1999 (aged 78); Höganäs, Sweden
- Other names: Tor Steen
- Occupation: Actor
- Spouse: Gun Malmhed (m. 1954–1999)

Torsten Lilliecrona (4 January 1921 – 15 October 1999) was a Swedish actor. He is mostly famous for his role as Melker Melkersson in the highly successful TV show Vi på Saltkråkan (Life on Seacrow Island) for which Astrid Lindgren wrote the script. He starred in over 100 productions in film and television before his death in 1999 as well as in radio shows and theater productions, but eventually became identified with the character Melker Melkerson.

== Selected filmography ==
- Rid i natt! (1942) - Anders Månsson (uncredited)
- The Heavenly Play (1942) - Peasant (uncredited)
- Katrina (1943) - Man talking with Gustaf at the dance (uncredited)
- Kungsgatan (1943) - Villgott (uncredited)
- Natt i hamn (1943) - Pajen (uncredited)
- Kungajakt (1944) - Footman
- Den osynliga muren (1944) - Soldier (uncredited)
- Flickan och djävulen (1944) - Executioner (uncredited)
- The Emperor of Portugallia (1944) - Boy in the grocery store (uncredited)
- Jolanta the Elusive Pig (1945) - Folke Lindgren
- Krigsmans erinran (1947) - Mayer (cook) (uncredited)
- Jørund Smed (1948)
- Port of Call (1948) - Fighter with Mustache (uncredited)
- Private Bom (1948) - Inskrivningsofficeren (uncredited)
- Smeder på luffen (1949) - Strömmer, smith (uncredited)
- The Street (1949) - Undercover Police Officer (uncredited)
- Prison (1949) - Film Photographer (uncredited)
- Love Wins Out (1949) - Prison guard in Ravensbrück (uncredited)
- Andersson's Kalle (1950) - Helling's Companion (uncredited)
- The Quartet That Split Up (1950) - Rescuer (uncredited)
- Living on 'Hope' (1951) - Office clerk (uncredited)
- Customs Officer Bom (1951) - French prison guard (uncredited)
- Summer Interlude (1951) - Ljus-Pelle (uncredited)
- Secrets of Women (1952) - Waiter at the nightclub (uncredited)
- Han glömde henne aldrig (1952) - Policeman (uncredited)
- Love (1952) - Johan Johansson
- 69:an, sergeanten och jag (1952) - Edvin Rosenhjelm
- Summer with Monika (1953) - Chaufför på grönsakslagret
- Barabbas (1953) - Supervisor at Copper Mine on Cyprus (uncredited)
- I dur och skur (1953) - Sid's director
- All the World's Delights (1953) - Mickel
- Speed Fever (1953) - Lundkvist, lector
- Stupid Bom (1953) - Beppo
- Aldrig med min kofot eller... Drömtjuven (1954) - Bergman
- Taxi 13 (1954) - Police Lieutenant Johansson (uncredited)
- Girl Without a Name (1954) - Bo Ferne
- Seger i mörker (1954) - Policeman (uncredited)
- A Lesson in Love (1954) - Hotel Avsvik's Receptionist (uncredited)
- Karin Månsdotter (1954) - Jon Månsson - Guard at Gripsholm Castle (uncredited)
- The Yellow Squadron (1954) - Doctor
- Två sköna juveler (1954) - Bill
- Herr Arnes penningar (1954) - Jailer
- A Night at Glimmingehus (1954) - Jesper Stenswärd
- Lady and the Tramp (1955) - Bull (Swedish dubbing)
- Mord, lilla vän (1955) - Rune Gordon
- Darling of Mine (1955) - Man at Skansen Reading a Newspaper (uncredited)
- Blockerat spår (1955) - Torsten Lilliecrona
- Den glade skomakaren (1955) - Kalle Ljung
- Flicka i kasern (1955) - Corporal
- Laughing in the Sunshine (1956) - Policeman
- A Doll's House (1956) - Physician
- Egen ingång (1956) - Policeman (uncredited)
- Rätten att älska (1956) - Teacher
- Girls Without Rooms (1956) - Guest at Restaurant
- Johan på Snippen (1956) - Speaker
- Den långa julmiddagen (1956) - Brandon, cousin
- Mother Takes a Vacation (1957) - Director Broms
- Räkna med bråk (1957) - Stranded Admiral
- Lille Fridolf blir morfar (1957) - Patrik
- Night Light (1957) - Policeman
- Far till sol och vår (1957) - Trent
- The Koster Waltz (1958) - Reklambyrådirektör (uncredited)
- The Jazz Boy (1958) - Partygäst
- Swinging at the Castle (1959) - Driver (uncredited)
- Crime in Paradise (1959) - Torsten Lindgren
- Heart's Desire (1960)- Hans Mortimer
- On a Bench in a Park (1960) - Theater Director
- Do You Believe in Angels? (1961) - Stenman, staff manager
- Two Living, One Dead (1961) - The Doctor
- Svenska Floyd (1961) - Journalist
- Åsa-Nisse bland grevar och baroner (1961) - Patrik Segerclou
- Vi fixar allt (1961) - Oskarsson
- Briggen Tre Liljor (1961) - Skollärare Esberg
- Adam och Eva (1963) - Foreman at the Dream Factory
- Älskling på vift (1964) - The Chief
- Tjorven, Båtsman och Moses (1964) - Melker Melkersson
- Tjorven och Skrållan (1965) - Melker Melkersson
- Tjorven och Mysak (1966) - Melker
- Sarons ros och gubbarna i Knohult (1968) - Patrik Segerclou
- Pappa varför är du arg? Du gjorde likadant själv när du var ung (1968) - Gustaf Vikingson
- Vi på Saltkråkan (1968) - Melker Melkersson
- Ni ljuger (1969) - Prison inspector (uncredited)
- En och en (1978) - Gustav
- Höjdhoppar'n (1981) - Doctor
