= Taxi 13 (1954 film) =

1954 film

- Directed by: Börje Larsson
- Written by: Börje Larsson
- Starring: Elof Ahrle; Signe Hasso; Margit Carlqvist; Birgitta Valberg
- Cinematography: Curt Jonsson
- Edited by: Carl-Olov Skeppstedt
- Music by: Jules Sylvain
- Production companies: AB Centrumateljéerna; Börje Larsson-produktion
- Release date: 2 August 1954
- Running time: 104 minutes
- Country: Sweden
- Language: Swedish

Taxi 13 is a 1954 Swedish crime drama film directed as well as written by Börje Larsson and starring Elof Ahrle, Signe Hasso, Margit Carlqvist and Birgitta Valberg. It was shot at the Centrumateljéerna Studios in Stockholm. The film's sets were designed by the art director Nils Nilsson.

== Synopsis ==
A Stockholm taxi driver sets out to find out who murdered one of his colleagues.

== Cast ==
- Elof Ahrle as Johan Alm
- Signe Hasso as Agneta
- Margit Carlqvist as Vera
- Birgitta Valberg as Britt-Marie
- Bengt Blomgren as Fredrik
- Sten Gester as Man in Trenchcoat
- Hjördis Petterson as Mia Lundgren
- Ulf Johansson as Quarrelsome Man
- Nancy Dalunde as Quarrelsome Wife
- Ninni Löfberg as Mrs. Vestman
- Arthur Hultling as Victor Nilsson
- Sif Ruud as Miss Haglund
- Ingvar Kjellson as Artist
- Siegfried Fischer as Axel a.k.a. Sunshine
- Alf Östlund as Silent Marie
- Sven Holmberg as Taxi Driver
- Arvid Richter as Taxi Driver
- Sture Djerf as Hermansson
- Brigitte Ornstein as Office Girl
- Karl Erik Flens as Exuberant Man
- Olle Teimert as Young Man Trying to Avoid Paying
- Kjell Nordenskiöld as Young Man at Party
- Birger Åsander as Mr. Vestman
- Rolf Tourd as Vera's Street Friend
- Märta Dorff as Taxi Exchange Manager
- Svea Holst as Cyclist Discovering the Corpse
- Pelle Svedlund as Embessler
- Elsa Winge as Mrs. Lindblad
- Alva Berggren as Waitress Giving Notice
- Arthur Fischer as Taxi Owner
- Claes Esphagen as Garage Washer
- Bo Gunnar Eriksson as Tommy
- Lissi Alandh as Hermansson's Woman
- Torsten Lilliecrona as Police Lieutenant Johansson

== Bibliography ==
- Qvist, Per Olov & von Bagh, Peter. Guide to the Cinema of Sweden and Finland. Greenwood Publishing Group, 2000.
