= Harriet Andersson =

Swedish actress (born 1932)

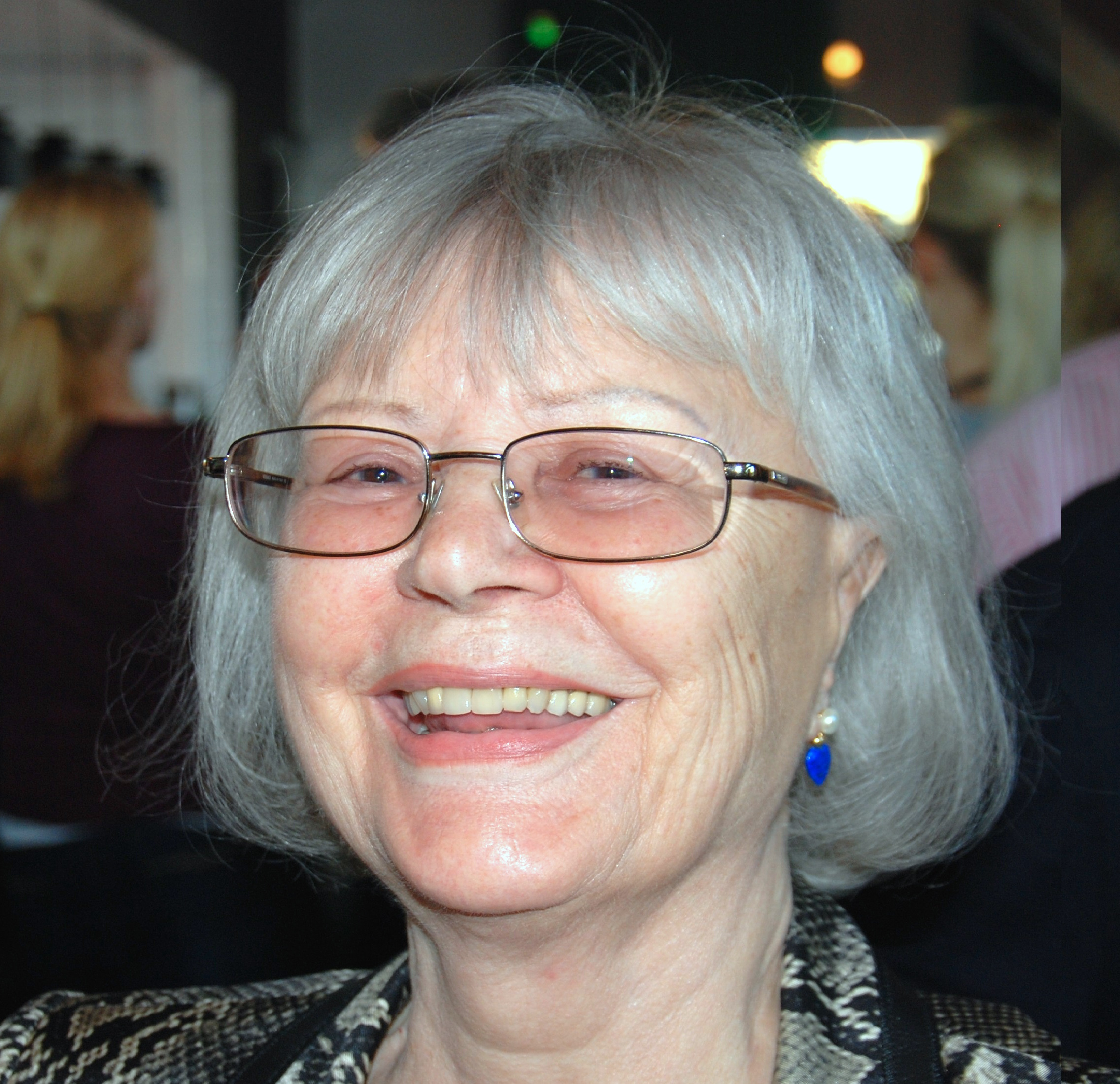
- Andersson in 2014
- Born: Harriet Andersson; 14 February 1932 (age 94); Stockholm, Sweden
- Occupation: Actress
- Years active: 1949–2007
- Spouses: Bertil Wejfeldt (m. 1959–1964) Bobo Håkansson (m. 1980–1982)
- Partner(s): Per Oscarsson (1951–1953); Ingmar Bergman (1953–1955); Gunnar Hellström (1956–1958); Jörn Donner (1960s); Börje Åberg (1970s); Ulf Törnberg (1970s)
- Children: 1

Harriet Andersson (born 14 February 1932) is a Swedish actress, best known outside Sweden for being part of director Ingmar Bergman's stock company. She often plays impulsive, working class characters.

== Film actress ==
Harriet Andersson began her acting career as a 15-year-old student at Calle Flygare stage school. She joined director Ingmar Bergman for several stage productions at Malmö stadsteater between 1953 and 1956.

In a 2008 interview with Mick LaSalle of the San Francisco Chronicle, Andersson debunked a rumor that she was discovered by Bergman while working as an elevator operator: "In an elevator! Ha, that's a new one for me. No. I did operate an elevator, but that was when I was 14½! Ingmar did not discover me. I was discovered in 1949 in theater school. Before Monika, I had many small parts. Most of them were a little like Monika. I looked that way. I looked like a bad girl. But I wasn't a bad girl, really. I was a very nice little girl, until I found out what life was."

Bergman wrote the title role in Summer with Monika (1953), specifically for Andersson. Filmed in Sweden, the motion picture shows the romantic history of two disaffected youths from first meeting to a summer idyll followed by their hasty marriage and subsequent divorce.

Although the romantic relationship with Bergman was brief, they continued to work together. Andersson appeared in several of his best-known films, including Smiles of a Summer Night (1955), Through a Glass Darkly (1961), Cries and Whispers (1972), and Fanny and Alexander (1982).

In Through A Glass Darkly, in which Andersson appeared with Max von Sydow and Gunnar Björnstrand, she portrays a latent schizophrenic. The plot deals with the actions of four persons during a twenty-four-hour period in an old house a far distance out on the Swedish Archipelago. Some audiences were shocked by Andersson's vivid portrayal of the presence of God as represented in the dark world of a schizophrenic.

Like several other Bergman associates, she has also had a career in English-language films including performances in Sidney Lumet's The Deadly Affair (1966) and later in Lars von Trier's Dogville (2003).

Her autobiography, a set of interviews with Jan Lumholdt, was published in 2006.

== Awards ==
Andersson has won several acting awards, including the Swedish Guldbagge Award, the Norwegian Amanda and best actress awards on the Venice Film Festival (1964) and the 9th Moscow International Film Festival (1975). In 1968, Andersson received the Bodil Award for Best Actress for her role in the Henning Carlsen Danish comedy People Meet and Sweet Music Fills the Heart. Recently, Andersson won the Lifetime Achievement Award at the Stockholm International Film Festival 2010.

== Personal life ==
Harriet Andersson was married to childhood friend Bertil Wejfeldt 1959–1963/4. She has a daughter, Petra Wejfeldt (b. 1960), whom Andersson named after her character in Smiles of a Summer Night. She lived with the Finnish director Jörn Donner for some years in the 1960s, and she appeared in Donner's films, A Sunday in September (1963), To Love (1964), Adventure Starts Here (1965) and Anna (1970).

== Selected filmography ==
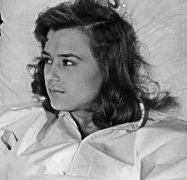
Harriet Andersson in 1952

- Playing Truant (1949)
- Andersson's Kalle (1950)
- The Motor Cavaliers (1950)
- Teacher's First Born (1950)
- Knockout at the Breakfast Club (1950)
- While the City Sleeps (1950)
- The Kiss on the Cruise (1950)
- Two Stories Up (1950)
- Beef and the Banana (1951)
- My Name Is Puck (1951)
- U-Boat 39 (1952)
- Defiance (1952)
- Summer with Monika (1953)
- Sawdust and Tinsel (1953)
- A Lesson in Love (1954)
- Dreams (1955)
- Smiles of a Summer Night (1955)
- Whoops! (1955)
- Last Pair Out (1956)
- Night Child (1956)
- Synnöve Solbakken (1957)
- Woman in a Fur Coat (1958)
- More Than a Match for the Navy (1958)
- Crime in Paradise (1959)
- Through a Glass Darkly (1961)
- Barbara (1961)
- Siska (1962)
- A Sunday in September (1963)
- To Love (1964)
- Loving Couples (1964)
- All These Women (1964)
- Adventure Starts Here (1965)
- Ormen (1966)
- The Deadly Affair (1967)
- People Meet and Sweet Music Fills the Heart (1967)
- Rooftree (1967)
- The Girls (1968)
- The Last Roman (1968/69)
- Anna (1970)
- Cries and Whispers (1972)
- The Day the Clown Cried (1972) (never released)
- The White Wall (1975)
- Fanny and Alexander (1982)
- Raskenstam (1983)
- The Blessed Ones (1986)
- Himmel og Helvede (1988)
- Brenda Brave (1989)
- Dogville (2003)
