= We Three Debutantes =

1953 film

- Directed by: Hasse Ekman
- Written by: Herbert Grevenius; Olof Molander
- Produced by: Svensk Filmindustri
- Starring: Maj-Britt Nilsson; Sven-Eric Gamble; Per Oscarsson; Karl Gerhard
- Cinematography: Gunnar Fischer
- Edited by: Hans Lagerkvist
- Music by: Lille Bror Söderlundh
- Production company: Svensk Filmindustri
- Distributed by: Svensk Filmindustri
- Release date: 7 September 1953
- Running time: 95 minutes
- Country: Sweden
- Language: Swedish

We Three Debutantes (Swedish: Vi tre debutera) is a 1953 Swedish drama film directed by Hasse Ekman and starring Maj-Britt Nilsson, Sven-Eric Gamble, Per Oscarsson and Karl Gerhard. It was shot at the Råsunda Studios in Stockholm and on location in the city. The film's sets were designed by the art director Nils Svenwall.

== Cast ==
- Maj-Britt Nilsson as Lo Stjärnholm
- Sven-Eric Gamble as Ludvig Lans
- Per Oscarsson as Lillebror Brummer
- Karl Gerhard as Karl Gerhard
- Olof Winnerstrand as Publisher
- Gunnel Broström as Secretary
- Gunnar Björnstrand as Director Brummer
- Åke Grönberg as Swedish John
- Claes Thelander as Young Publisher
- Douglas Håge as Frisk
