= Birgitte Reimer =

Danish actress (1926–2021)

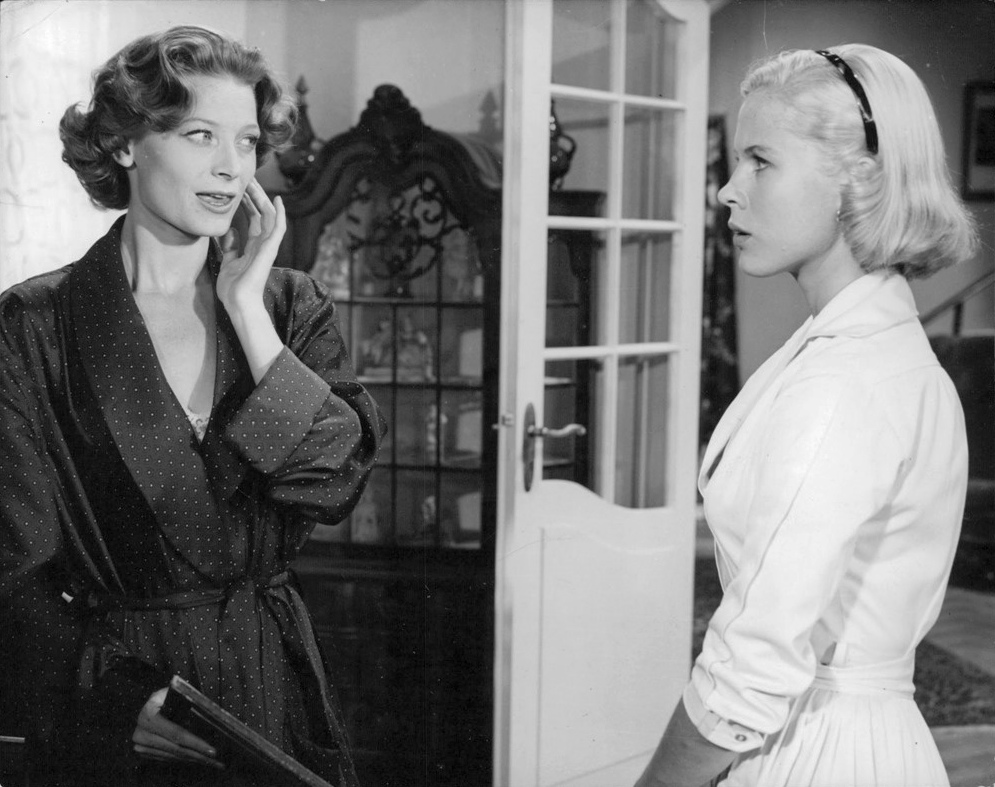
- Reimer (left) in Summer Place Wanted, 1957
- Born: 8 February 1926; Nykøbing Falster, Denmark
- Died: 19 April 2021 (aged 95); France
- Occupation: Actress
- Years active: 1947–1964

Birgitte Reimer (8 February 1926 – 19 April 2021) was a Danish film actress. She appeared in 17 films between 1947 and 1964. Reimer died in April 2021 at the age of 95.

== Filmography ==
- Soldaten og Jenny (1947)
- I de lyse nætter (1948)
- Som sendt fra himlen (1951)
- Gamle guld, Det (1951)
- We Who Go the Kitchen Route (1953)
- Solstik (1953)
- Adam og Eva (1953)
- En lektion i kärlek (1954)
- Hvad vil De ha'? (1956)
- Vi som går stjernevejen (1956)
- Sommarnöje sökes (1957)
- Parasitterne (1958)
- Møde ved midnat (1958)
- Vi er allesammen tossede (1959)
- Den grønne elevator (1961)
- Oskar (1962)
- Når enden er go' (1964)
