= Night Light (film) =

1957 film

- Poster
- Directed by: Lars-Eric Kjellgren
- Written by: Lars-Eric Kjellgren; Ingmar Bergman
- Produced by: Allan Ekelund
- Starring: Marianne Bengtsson; Lars Ekborg; Gunnar Björnstrand
- Cinematography: Åke Dahlqvist
- Edited by: Oscar Rosander
- Music by: Bengt Hallberg; Lars-Erik Larsson
- Production company: Svensk Filmindustri
- Distributed by: Svensk Filmindustri
- Release date: 14 October 1957
- Running time: 90 minutes
- Country: Sweden
- Language: Swedish

Night Light (Swedish: Nattens ljus) is a 1957 Swedish romantic comedy film directed by Lars-Eric Kjellgren and starring Marianne Bengtsson, Lars Ekborg and Gunnar Björnstrand. It was shot at the Råsunda Studios in Stockholm. The film's sets were designed by the art director P.A. Lundgren.

== Synopsis ==
A girl from a small town heads to Stockholm to begin a new life.

== Cast ==
- Marianne Bengtsson as Maria Pettersson
- Lars Ekborg as Peter
- Gunnar Björnstrand as Mr. Purman
- Birger Malmsten as Mikael Sjöberg
- Gösta Cederlund as Alfred Björk
- Erik Strandmark as Nice Ruffian
- Georg Rydeberg as Director
- Gaby Stenberg as Ka
- Helge Hagerman as Andersson
- Gösta Prüzelius as Pettersson
- Torsten Lilliecrona as Policeman
- Renée Björling as Mrs. Wilhelmsson
- Hanny Schedin as Mrs. Nilsson
- Sven-Eric Gamble as Photographer
- Sten Ardenstam as Lundström
- Ivar Wahlgren as Mr. Wilhelmsson
- Gösta Jonsson as 'Toppen'
- Alf Östlund as Gentleman Whose Car Is Stolen
- Sven-Axel Carlsson as Gentleman at the Dance Restaurant
- Stig Johanson as Tram Driver
- Gunnar Sjöberg as Policeman

== Bibliography ==
- Cardullo, Bert. Screening the Stage: Studies in Cinedramatic Art. Peter Lang, 2006.
