= Det är aldrig för sent =

1956 film

- Directed by: Barbro Boman
- Starring: Inga Landgré
- Release date: 17 March 1956
- Running time: 80 minutes
- Country: Sweden
- Language: Swedish

Det är aldrig för sent is a 1956 Swedish drama film directed by Barbro Boman.

== Cast ==
- Inga Landgré as Görel Rocke
- Marianne Aminoff as Birgit Karpell
- Renée Björling as Jeanne
- Bengt Blomgren as Arne Rocke
- Gunnar Björnstrand as Professor Rocke
- Hugo Björne as Gustafsson
- Ulla-Carin Rydén as Karin
- Sif Ruud as Dagmar, Cook
- Märta Dorff as Housemaid
- Kaj Nohrborg as Axel
- Hans Strååt as Art Dealer
