= Lissi Alandh =

Swedish actress (1930–2008)

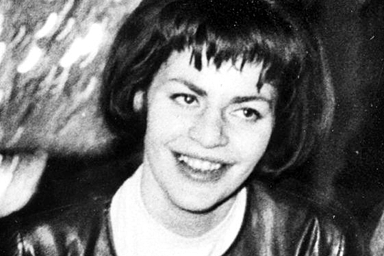
- Alandh in 1963.
- Born: 29 December 1930; Skön, Sweden
- Died: 3 August 2008 (aged 77); Stockholm, Sweden
- Occupation: Actress
- Years active: 1948-1992 (film & TV)

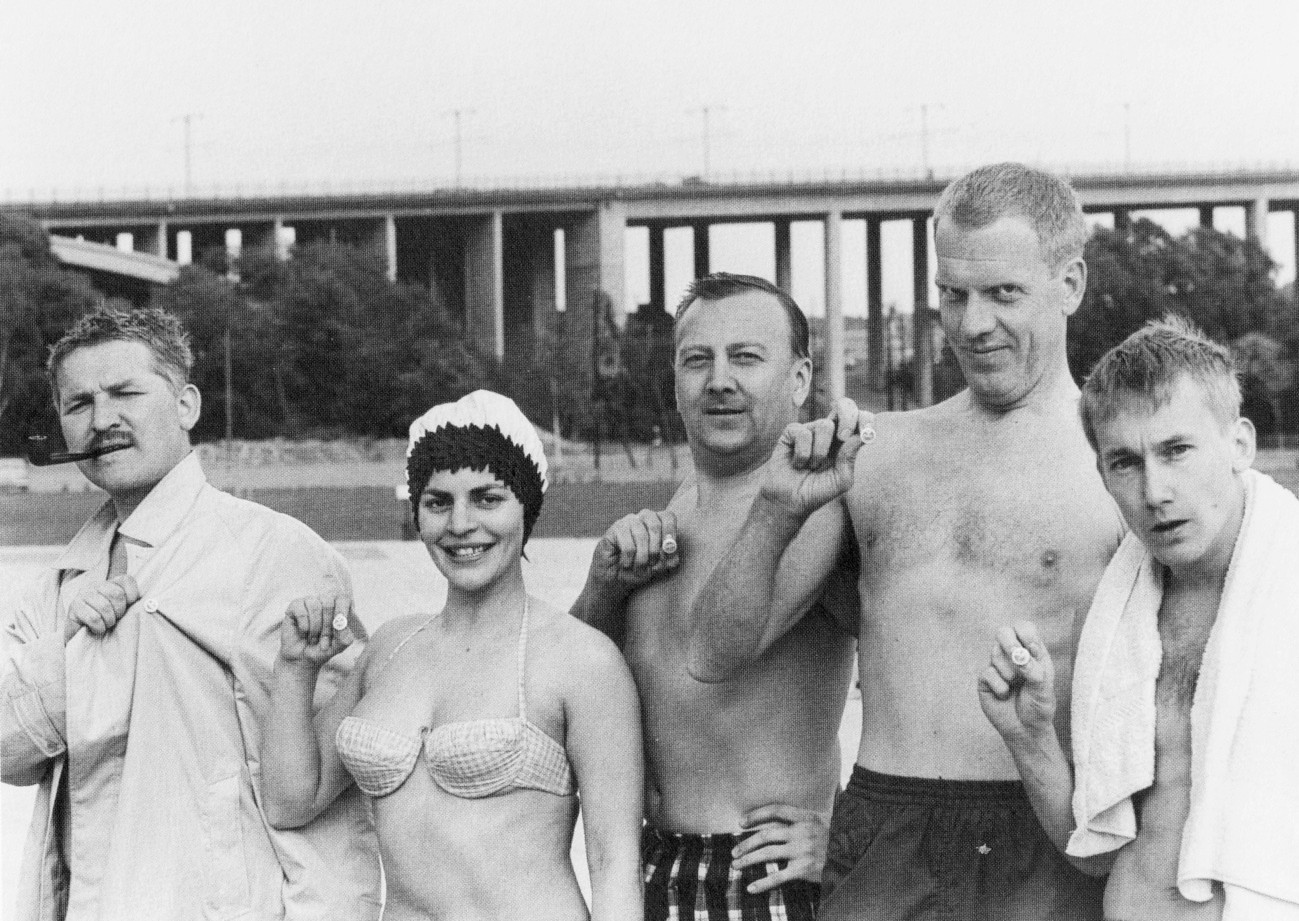
Lissi Alandh and Simborgarmärket

Lissi Alandh (1930–2008) was a Swedish film, stage and television actress.

== Selected filmography ==
- Loffe the Tramp (1948)
- The Street (1949)
- Big Lasse of Delsbo (1949)
- The Realm of the Rye (1950)
- Miss Julie (1951)
- In Lilac Time (1952)
- Ursula, the Girl from the Finnish Forests (1953)
- Marianne (1953)
- No Man's Woman (1953)
- A Night in the Archipelago (1953)
- Unmarried Mothers (1953)
- Taxi 13 (1954)
- Storm Over Tjurö (1954)
- Enchanted Walk (1954)
- Whoops! (1955)
- The Hard Game (1956)
- Girls Without Rooms (1956)
- Mannequin in Red (1958)
- Loving Couples (1964)
- Night Games (1966)
- The Lustful Vicar (1970)

== Bibliography ==
- Steene, Birgitta. Ingmar Bergman: A Reference Guide. Amsterdam University Press, 2005.
