= You Are My Adventure =

- Directed by: Stig Olin
- Written by: Hasse Ekman, Stig Olin
- Starring: Sickan Carlsson; Gunnar Björnstrand; Bibi Andersson
- Release date: 24 March 1958
- Running time: 97 minutes
- Country: Sweden
- Language: Swedish

You Are My Adventure (Swedish: Du är mitt äventyr) is a 1958 Swedish comedy film directed by Stig Olin.

== Plot ==
Tore works as a journalist at the Daily News in Stockholm. The newspaper has a new employee, Lena Bergström. Lena has written an article in the paper, which Tore should have written. On top of this they will now share his office, it is not the best circumstances for them to start off on.

Lena is very effective and ambitious and this makes Tore feel displaced in his previous office. But Tore also feel attracted to Lena and during a joint mission in the mountains, he shows his feelings. In short, they are married. At the same time Lena's journalistic successes continues. The couple soon have a little baby on their hands, and they hire a maid to be able to keep working. But the maids resign, one after the other, and after sacking their fourth maid Tore comes to the conclusion: Because he earns less money, he will stop working and stay at home with their child and take care of the home.

Lena is happy that she can focus on her career and she continues to work very hard. Tore sees less and less of her. One day the doorbell rings, and outside stands a young woman, Chris Blom, an art student. She talks about an advertised room. Tore, is somewhat surprised by this, but goes a head anyway with letting the room out and she moves in. Now it is suddenly Lena who feels left out...

== Cast ==
- Sickan Carlsson - Lena Bergström-Hall, journalist
- Gunnar Björnstrand - Tore Hall, journalist
- Bibi Andersson - Christina Blom, art student
- Siv Ericks - Marianne, journalist
- Helge Hagerman - Sverker Knutsson
- Sven-Eric Gamble - Olle
- Sif Ruud - maid 1
- Elisabeth Falk - maid 2
- Mona Geijer-Falkner - maid 3
- Anette Sandberg - maid 4
