= Whoops! (film) =

1955 film

- Directed by: Stig Olin
- Written by: Olle Strandberg
- Produced by: Alf Jörgensen; Lorens Marmstedt
- Starring: Povel Ramel; Harriet Andersson; Sven Lindberg
- Cinematography: Hilding Bladh
- Edited by: Lennart Arvidsson
- Music by: Povel Ramel
- Production company: Terrafilm
- Distributed by: Terrafilm
- Release date: 3 September 1955
- Running time: 92 minutes
- Country: Sweden
- Language: Swedish

Whoops! (Swedish: Hoppsan!) is a 1955 Swedish comedy mystery film directed by Stig Olin and starring Povel Ramel, Harriet Andersson and Sven Lindberg. It was shot at the Centrumateljéerna Studios in Stockholm. The film's sets were designed by the art directors Yngve Gamlin and Nils Nilsson.

== Cast ==
- Povel Ramel as Hubert Yrhage
- Harriet Andersson as Lena Lett
- Sven Lindberg as Gary Lundberg
- Douglas Håge as Darling Karlsson
- Georg Rydeberg as Jens Myskovich
- Carl-Gustaf Lindstedt as Tyko Kölstav
- Ingrid Thulin as Malou Hjorthage
- Lissi Alandh asLillan Persson-Quist
- Olle Pettersson as Jan Järpe
- Marianne Löfgren as Juttan Järpe
- Elsa Prawitz as Sylvia Blidfjell
- Curt Löwgren as Fritiof Andersson
- Gull Natorp as Beda
- Signe Wirff as Anna
- Olof Sandborg as Major Löwenbräu
- Margit Andelius as Chairman at the meeting
- Mona Geijer-Falkner as Woman at the meeting
- Astrid Bodin as Woman with dog
- Julie Bernby as Darlings spion
- Agda Helin as Mrs. Andersson
- Sven Holmberg as Police Officer
- Hanny Schedin as Kund i mjölkaffären
- Mille Schmidt as Inspicient på båten Vågspelet
- Marianne Nielsen as Guitar Player
- Gösta Prüzelius as Custom Official
- Per-Axel Arosenius as Police Officer
- Birger Åsander as Crook

== Bibliography ==
- Qvist, Per Olov & von Bagh, Peter. Guide to the Cinema of Sweden and Finland. Greenwood Publishing Group, 2000.
