= Summer Place Wanted =

1957 film

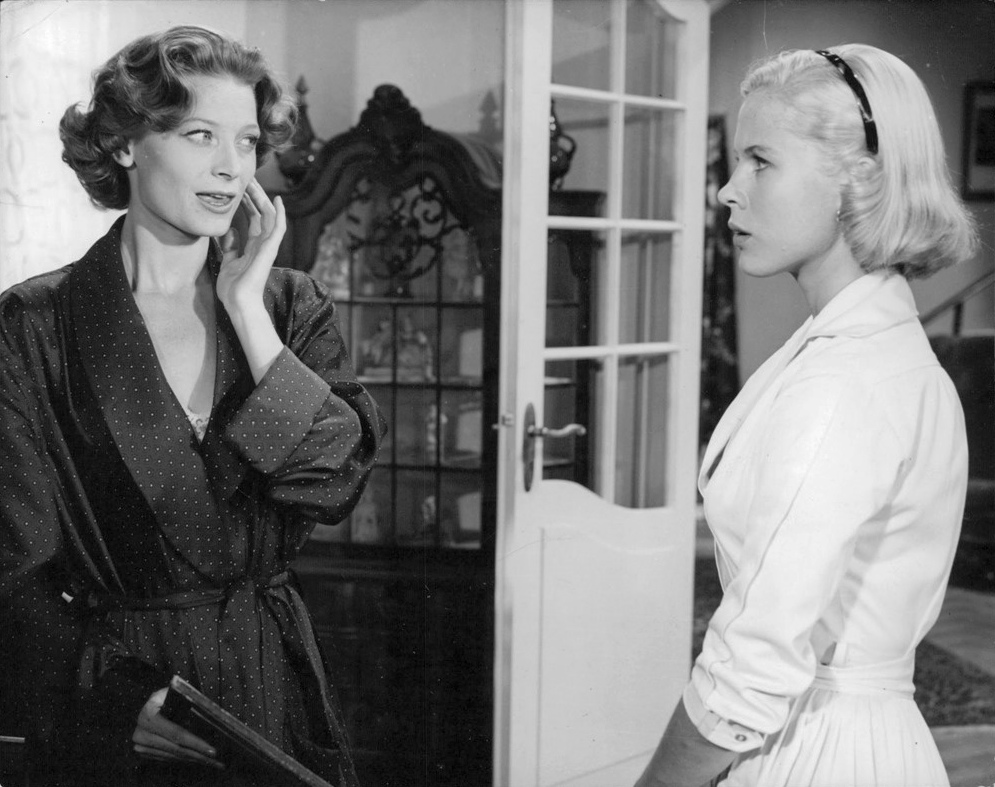
- Still with Birgitte Reimer and Bibi Andersson
- Directed by: Hasse Ekman
- Written by: Hasse Ekman
- Starring: Eva Dahlbeck; Gunnar Björnstrand
- Cinematography: Martin Bodin
- Release date: 21 December 1957
- Running time: 98 minutes
- Country: Sweden
- Language: Swedish

Summer Place Wanted (Swedish: Sommarnöje sökes) is a 1957 Swedish comedy film directed by Hasse Ekman. It was entered into the 1st Moscow International Film Festival, where Ekman was nominated for a Grand Prix.

== Plot ==
Ingeborg Dahlstrom puts in an ad in the Swedish newspaper Svenska Dagbladet, she is looking for a summer house. Later Ingeborg, her husband Gustaf and their 17-year-old daughter Mona travel to Stockholm archipelago, to the place they got hold of with the ad. It turns out, however, that the man they hire the house from takes a big interest in Ingeborg. But it's not only Ingeborg who gets courted elsewhere, so is Gustaf.

== Cast ==
- Eva Dahlbeck as Ingeborg Dahlström
- Gunnar Björnstrand as Lawyer Gustaf Dahlström
- Bibi Andersson as Mona Dahlström
- Birgitte Reimer as Lizzy
- Alf Kjellin as Arne Forsman, artist
- Claes-Håkan Westergren as Tom Åkermark
- Sigge Fürst as Nisse Persson
