= No Tomorrow (1957 film) =

1957 film

- Swedish: Ingen morgondag
- Directed by: Arne Mattsson
- Written by: Mika Waltari
- Based on: No Tomorrow by Mika Waltari
- Produced by: Jack S. Kotschack
- Starring: Jarl Kulle; Margit Carlqvist; Kolbjörn Knudsen
- Cinematography: Osmo Harkimo
- Edited by: Lennart Wallén
- Music by: Einar Englund
- Production company: AB Svea Film
- Distributed by: AB Svea Film
- Release date: 17 October 1957
- Running time: 105 minutes
- Country: Sweden
- Language: Swedish

No Tomorrow (Swedish: Ingen morgondag) is a 1957 Swedish drama film directed by Arne Mattsson and starring Jarl Kulle, Margit Carlqvist and Kolbjörn Knudsen. It was shot at the Centrumateljéerna Studios in Stockholm and on location in Helsinki and Porkkalanniemi on the Gulf of Finland. The film's sets were designed by the art director Bibi Lindström. It was adapted by Finnish writer Mika Waltari from his own novel of the same title.

== Synopsis ==
During the Continuation War, Finnish Captain Viktor Aaltonen is taken prisoner in Karelia and sent to a Soviet prisoner of war camp for many years.

== Cast ==
- Jarl Kulle as Viktor Aaltonen
- Margit Carlqvist as Astrid Bergas
- Kolbjörn Knudsen as Bergas
- Lars Ekborg as Raul
- Allan Edwall as Poet
- Carl-Olof Alm as Artist
- Olof Widgren as Doctor Linnmo
- Gunnar Olsson as Toivo Hietari
- Jan Olov Andersson as Pojke som pekar ut mordplats
- Eric Fröling as Socialhjälpstjänsteman
- Åke Lindman as Förrymd fånge
- Tapio Rautavaara as Man singing and playing guitar
- Anneli Sauli as Konstnärens modell
- Henake Schubak as Bergas betjänt
- Axel Slangus as Blind tiggare
- Brita Öberg as Mrs. Hietari

== Bibliography ==
- Cowie, Peter Françoise Buquet, Risto Pitkänen & Godfried Talboom. Scandinavian Cinema: A Survey of the Films and Film-makers of Denmark, Finland, Iceland, Norway, and Sweden. Tantivy Press, 1992.
- Qvist, Per Olov & von Bagh, Peter. Guide to the Cinema of Sweden and Finland. Greenwood Publishing Group, 2000.
