= Margit Carlqvist =

Swedish actress (1932–2026)

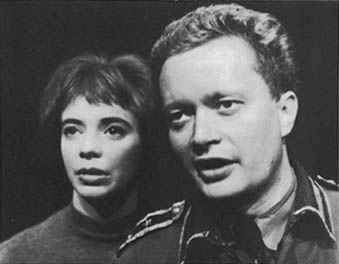
Swedish actors Margit Carlqvist and Ernst-Hugo Järegård in Jean-Paul Sartre's "Fångarna på Altona" (The Condemned of Altona), Gothenburg City Theatre, 1961.

Margit Carlqvist (11 February 1932 – 20 September 2026) was a Swedish actress. Born in Stockholm, she starred in many Swedish films during the 1950s. Internationally, she may be best known for her role in Ingmar Bergman's film, Smiles of a Summer Night. Carlqvist died on 20 September 2026, at the age of 94.

== Selected filmography ==
- To Joy (Till glädje, 1950)
- Stronger Than the Law (1951)
- Encounter with Life (1952)
- The Clang of the Pick (1952)
- She Came Like the Wind (1952)
- Marianne (1953)
- The Glass Mountain (1953)
- The Road to Klockrike (1953)
- Taxi 13 (1954)
- Dance in the Smoke (1954)
- The Summer Wind Blows (1955)
- The People of Hemsö
- Smiles of a Summer Night (1955)
- My Passionate Longing (1956)
- Stage Entrance (1956)
- A Dreamer's Journey (1957)
- No Tomorrow (1957)
- Line Six (1958)
- Love Mates (Änglar, finns dom?, 1961)
- The Lady in White (1962)
- Hide and Seek (1963)
- Loving Couples (Älskande par, 1964)
- We Are All Demons (1969)
- The Lustful Vicar (Kyrkoherden, 1970)
- The Last Adventure (Det sista äventyret, 1974)
