= Hidden in the Fog =

1953 film

- Directed by: Lars-Eric Kjellgren
- Written by: Vic Sunesson; Barbro Alving; Lars-Eric Kjellgren
- Based on: Hidden in the Fog by Vic Sunesson
- Produced by: Allan Ekelund
- Starring: Eva Henning; Sonja Wigert; Hjördis Petterson
- Cinematography: Gunnar Fischer
- Edited by: Tage Holmberg
- Music by: Erik Nordgren
- Production company: Svensk Filmindustri
- Distributed by: Svensk Filmindustri
- Release date: 2 November 1953
- Running time: 88 minutes
- Country: Sweden
- Language: Swedish

Hidden in the Fog (Swedish: I dimma dold) is a 1953 Swedish mystery crime film directed by Lars-Eric Kjellgren and starring Eva Henning, Sonja Wigert and Hjördis Petterson. It was shot at the Råsunda Studios in Stockholm and on location around the city. The film's sets were designed by the art director P.A. Lundgren. It was based on the 1951 novel of the same title by Vic Sunesson, who also contributed to the screenplay.

== Synopsis ==
When her husband is found dead at their home, his wife becomes the prime suspect for his murder.

== Cast ==
- Eva Henning as Lora Willding
- Sonja Wigert as Jimmie Hedström - Femme Fatale
- Hjördis Petterson as Annie Eriksson
- Dagmar Ebbesen as Vilma
- Sif Ruud as Bojan of Stureplan
- Mimi Nelson as Salvation Army Soldier
- Sven Lindberg as Police Inspector Kjell Myrman
- Sture Lagerwall as Jack Willding
- Georg Rydeberg as Walter Willding
- Hugo Björne as Fredrik Sjövall
- Erik Strandmark as Olle Lindaeus
- Erik 'Bullen' Berglund as Chief Superintendent
- Torsten Hillberg as Policeman
- Henrik Schildt as Journalist
- Bengt Blomgren as Journalist
- Carl Andersson as Guest at the Wedding
- Fritiof Billquist as Man Reading the Newspaper
- Frithiof Bjärne as Policeman on the Phone
- Brita Borg as Singer
- Mats Dahlbäck as Young Man on the Tram
- Sture Djerf as Journalist
- Curt Ericson as Criminal Detective
- Claes Esphagen as Wardrober at Restaurant Cecil
- Fritjof Hellberg as Man
- Svea Holm as Waitress
- Åke Hylén as Press Photographer
- Marianne Ljunggren as Miss China
- Arne Ragneborn as Finnish Housemaid's Boyfriend
- Magdalena Swahn as Annie's Finnish Housemaid
- Putte Wickman as Member of the Orchestra
- Gudrun Östbye as Young Girl in Love on the Tram

== Bibliography ==
- Brunsdale, Mitzi M. Encyclopedia of Nordic Crime Fiction: Works and Authors of Denmark, Finland, Iceland, Norway and Sweden Since 1967. McFarland, 2016.
- Qvist, Per Olov & von Bagh, Peter. Guide to the Cinema of Sweden and Finland. Greenwood Publishing Group, 2000.
