= Sven-Axel Carlsson =

Swedish actor (1932–1971)

- Born: 11 September 1932; Stockholm, Sweden
- Died: 29 October 1971 (aged 39); Nacka, Sweden
- Occupation: Actor
- Years active: 1945–1971

Sven-Axel Carlsson (11 September 1932 – 29 October 1971) was a Swedish actor. He began his screen career as a child actor in the 1940s. Many of his final film performances came in the Åsa-Nisse series.

== Selected filmography ==
- Bill Bergson, Master Detective (1947)
- The Key and the Ring (1947)
- This Can't Happen Here (1950)
- The Motor Cavaliers (1950)
- Fiancée for Hire (1950)
- Skipper in Stormy Weather (1951)
- She Came Like the Wind (1952)
- Say It with Flowers (1952)
- U-Boat 39 (1952)
- Speed Fever (1953)
- The Glass Mountain (1953)
- En karl i köket (1954)
- Dance in the Smoke (1954)
- The Vicious Breed (1954)
- Paradise (1955)
- Voyage in the Night (1955)
- Suss gott (1956)
- The Stranger from the Sky (1956)
- Night Light (1957)
- The Jazz Boy (1958)
- Crime in Paradise (1959)
- Heaven and Pancake (1959)
- Åsa-Nisse slår till (1965)
- Åsa-Nisse i raketform (1966)
- Åsa-Nisse i agentform (1967)
- Åsa-Nisse och den stora kalabaliken (1968)
- Åsa-Nisse i rekordform (1969)

== Bibliography ==
- Vermilye, Jerry. Ingmar Bergman: His Life and Films. McFarland, 2015.
