= Stage Entrance (film) =

1956 film

- Directed by: Bengt Ekerot
- Written by: Erland Josephson
- Produced by: Alf Jörgensen; Lorens Marmstedt
- Starring: Edvin Adolphson; Margit Carlqvist; Gio Petré
- Cinematography: Göran Strindberg
- Edited by: Lennart Wallén
- Music by: Charles Redland
- Production company: Terrafilm
- Distributed by: Terrafilm
- Release date: 3 December 1956
- Running time: 92 minutes
- Country: Sweden
- Language: Swedish

Stage Entrance (Swedish: Sceningång) is a 1956 Swedish drama film directed by Bengt Ekerot and starring Edvin Adolphson, Margit Carlqvist and Gio Petré. It was shot at the Centrumateljéerna Studios in Stockholm and on location around the city. The film's sets were designed by the art director Nils Nilsson.

== Synopsis ==
It portrays a day at the Royal Dramatic Theatre and the various actors, students and others who make up its company as they prepare for a production of King Lear.

== Cast ==
- Edvin Adolphson as Knut Mattsson
- Margit Carlqvist as Sigrid Jansson, actress
- Gio Petré as Nora Bring
- Lars Ekborg as Leander
- Bengt Ekerot as Johan Eriksson
- Per Sjöstrand as Sven, acting student
- Arne Nyberg as Unit manager
- Stig Olin as Bernard Stensson
- Erik Strandmark as Torén
- Sif Ruud as Landlady
- Erland Josephson as Bergkvist, director / Narrator
- Barbro Larsson as Student
- Renée Björling as Edit Strand
- Björn Berglund as Drama teacher
- Claes-Håkan Westergren as Hasse, acting student
- Tommy Nilson as 'Tjockis', acting student
- Sissi Kaiser as Kristina, actress
- Gertrud Bodlund as Speech teacher
- Arne Lindblad as Make-up teacher
- Mona Åstrand as Eva, acting student
- Gunnel Sporr as Acting student
- Gull Natorp as Woman
- Mona Geijer-Falkner as Cleaning lady
- Svea Holm as Cleaning lady
- Helga Brofeldt as Prompter
- Margit Andelius as Cleaning lady
- Astrid Bodin as Cleaning lady

== Bibliography ==
- Cowie, Peter. Film in Sweden: Stars and Players. Tantivy Press, 1977.
