= Crime in Paradise =

1959 film

- Directed by: Lars-Eric Kjellgren
- Written by: Folke Mellvig; Gardar Sahlberg
- Produced by: Allan Ekelund
- Starring: Harriet Andersson; Gunnar Björnstrand; Karl-Arne Holmsten
- Cinematography: Lasse Björne
- Edited by: Ingemar Ejve
- Music by: Erik Nordgren
- Production company: Svensk Filmindustri
- Distributed by: Svensk Filmindustri
- Release date: 7 September 1959
- Running time: 81 minutes
- Country: Sweden
- Language: Swedish

Crime in Paradise (Swedish: Brott i paradiset) is a 1959 Swedish crime thriller film directed by Lars-Eric Kjellgren and starring Harriet Andersson, Gunnar Björnstrand and Karl-Arne Holmsten. It was shot at the Råsunda Studios in Stockholm and on location around the city. The film's sets were designed by the art director P.A. Lundgren.

== Synopsis ==
During a robbery, a safe is blown up and a nightwatchman is accidentally killed. Ten years later his stepson receives information about the crime, and joins forces with Eva a crime reporter.

== Cast ==
- Harriet Andersson as Eva Malmborg
- Gunnar Björnstrand as Adam 'A.P.' Palmquist
- Karl-Arne Holmsten as Einar Hansson
- Gerd Hagman as Vivi Karlén
- Bengt Eklund as Tage Skoglund
- Torsten Lilliecrona as Torsten Lindgren
- Sven-Eric Gamble as Harry Lindgren
- Helge Hagerman as Gunnar Berg
- Hugo Björne as Arnold Jörner
- Inga Gill as Tobacconist
- Birgitta Andersson as Cigarette Girl
- Elsa Ebbesen as Mrs. Hansson
- Bengt Blomgren as Nystedt
- Mona Andersson as Waitress
- Sten Ardenstam as Police Detective
- Birgit Aronsson as Beauty Parlor Receptionist
- Greta Berthels as Mrs. Johansson
- Axel Bjelvén as Nightwatchman
- Sven-Axel Carlsson as Flower Messenger
- Karl Erik Flens as Police Detective
- Göthe Grefbo as Doorman
- Hans-Erik Holm as Boström
- Maud Hyttenberg as Waitress
- Karl Jonsson as Restaurant Guest
- Ludde Juberg as Janitor
- Ragnar Klange as Wallmark
- Sonja Kolthoff as Red Cross Woman
- Bengt Lindström as Police Detective
- Carin Lundquist as Alcohol Cashier
- Marrit Ohlsson as Cold Cuts Preparer
- Mille Schmidt as Cook
- Waldemar Thulin as Restaurant Guest
- Bengt von Strauss as Journalist
- Herbert Wellander as Monsieur Pierre
- Sioma Zubicky as Xylophone Player

== Bibliography ==
- Qvist, Per Olov & von Bagh, Peter. Guide to the Cinema of Sweden and Finland. Greenwood Publishing Group, 2000.
