= Kolbjörn Knudsen =

Swedish actor

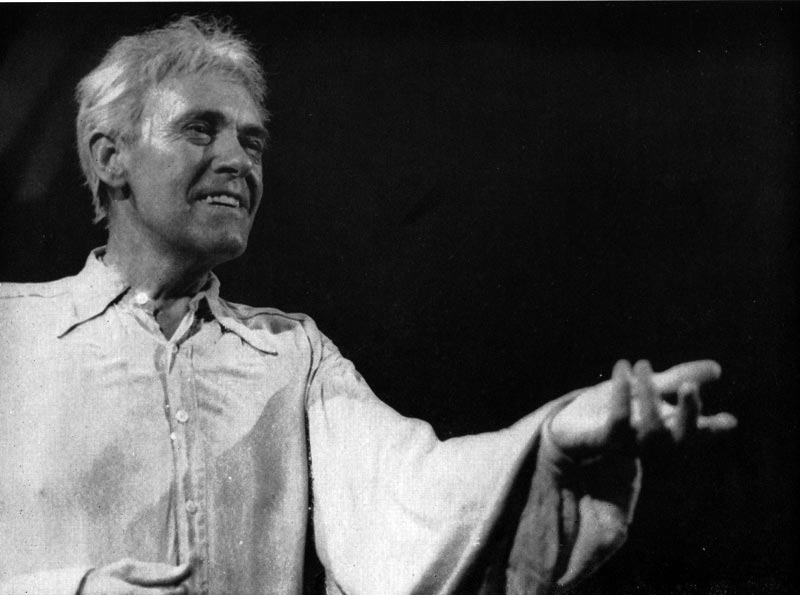
- Born: 13 October 1897; Bergen, Norway
- Died: 8 January 1967 (aged 69); Gothenburg, Sweden
- Occupation: Actor
- Years active: 1928-1967

Kolbjörn Knudsen (13 October 1897 – 8 January 1967) was a Swedish actor. He appeared in more than 30 films between 1928 and 1967.

== Selected filmography ==
- Sin (1928)
- Charlotte Löwensköld (1930)
- Conflict (1937)
- General von Döbeln (1942)
- Life in the Country (1943)
- Young Blood (1943)
- I Killed (1943)
- I Am Fire and Air (1944)
- Prince Gustaf (1944)
- The Girl and the Devil (1944)
- Black Roses (1945)
- The Girls in Smaland (1945)
- Rail Workers (1947)
- Love Wins Out (1949)
- Love (1952)
- The Road to Klockrike (1953)
- No Man's Woman (1953)
- Wild Birds (1955)
- When the Mills are Running (1956)
- No Tomorrow (1957)
- Synnöve Solbakken (1957)
- Winter Light (1963)
