= Speed Fever =

1953 film

- Directed by: Egil Holmsen
- Written by: Egil Holmsen; Nils Idström
- Produced by: Ewert Granholm
- Starring: Arne Ragneborn; Sven-Axel Carlsson; Erik Berglund
- Cinematography: Sten Dahlgren
- Edited by: Ragnar Engström
- Music by: Harry Arnold
- Production company: Svensk Talfilm
- Distributed by: Svensk Talfilm
- Release date: 27 November 1953
- Running time: 105 minutes
- Country: Sweden
- Language: Swedish

Speed Fever (Swedish: Fartfeber) is a 1953 Swedish drama film directed by Egil Holmsen and starring Arne Ragneborn, Sven-Axel Carlsson and Erik Berglund. The film's sets were designed by the art director Bertil Duroj. It was shot on location around Stockholm.

== Cast ==
- Arne Ragneborn as Kent Grönholm
- Sven-Axel Carlsson as Rolf 'Kina' Carlsson
- Håkan Serner as Gunnar Norén
- Erik Berglund as Klemens Grönholm
- Britta Brunius as Gunnar's Mother
- Erna Groth as Gerd
- Sven Lindberg as Björn 'Tårtpapperet' Bergkvist
- Erik Strandmark as Hebbe
- Harriett Philipson as Inez
- Stig Järrel as Chief Constable
- Arne Källerud as Kina's Father
- Torsten Lilliecrona as Lundkvist, lector
- Gus Dahlström as Comic Actor
- Holger Höglund as Comic Actor
- Stellan Agerlo as Ricke
- Yvonne Axö as Görel
- Julia Cæsar as Displeased Customer
- Hans Dahlberg as Tjatte
- Märta Dorff as Ellen
- Arthur Fischer as News-stand Owner
- Agda Helin as Kina's Mother
- Sven Holmberg as Pawnshop Customer
- Solveig Jäder as Grönholm's maid
- Lennart Lilja as The killed man
- Sune Mangs as Pupil
- Artur Rolén as Nilsson, trades-man
- Nina Scenna as Gullan, Adolf's wife
- Ann-Marie Skoglund as Anni
- Gunnel Sporr as Hebbe's Wife
- Elsa Winge as Kent's Mother
- Carl-Gunnar Wingård as Adolf
- Gudrun Östbye as Gerd's Friend

== Bibliography ==
- Qvist, Per Olov & von Bagh, Peter. Guide to the Cinema of Sweden and Finland. Greenwood Publishing Group, 2000.
