= Märta Dorff =

Swedish actress (1909–1990)

- Born: Märta Kristina Charlotta Dorff; 10 June 1909; Stockholm, Sweden
- Died: 6 October 1990 (age 81)
- Occupation: Actress
- Years active: 1930-1987

Märta Dorff (10 June 1909 – 6 October 1990) was a Swedish stage and film actress.

== Selected filmography ==
- Adventure (1936) - Karl Henriks sekreterare (uncredited)
- Witches' Night (1937) - Student (uncredited)
- For Better, for Worse (1938) - Nurse
- Pengar från skyn (1938) - A woman
- Nothing Is Forgotten (1942) - Dinner guest (uncredited)
- The Girl from the Third Row (1949) - Mrs. Burén
- Singoalla (1949) - Elfrida Månesköld
- While the City Sleeps (1950) - Iris' Mother
- Miss Julie (1951) - Kristin, cook
- Encounter with Life (1952)
- The Firebird (1952) - Seamstress
- Love (1952) - Selma Danielsson
- Unmarried Mothers (1953) - Mrs. Berglund
- The Girl from Backafall (1953) - Mrs. Larsson
- Dance, My Doll (1953) - Hildur
- No Man's Woman (1953) - Mrs. Henriksson
- All the World's Delights (1953) - Anna
- Marianne (1953) - Birger's Mother
- The Beat of Wings in the Night (1953) - Head Nurse
- Speed Fever (1953) - Ellen
- A Night in the Archipelago (1953) - Fru Lundkvist
- Our Father and the Gypsy (1954) - Frasse's Wife
- Storm Over Tjurö (1954) - Mrs. Sofia Bohm
- Taxi 13 (1954) - Taxi Exchange Manager
- Flicka med melodi (1954) - Mrs. Bergvall
- En karl i köket (1954) - Ms. Eriksson
- Simon the Sinner (1954) - Simon's Mother
- The Girl in the Rain (1955) - Matron
- The Dance Hall (1955) - Ofelia
- Getting Married (1955) - Aunt Emilia's guest (uncredited)
- Violence (1955) - Vera's mother
- The Unicorn (1955) - Anna, nurse (uncredited)
- Sista ringen (1955) - Eva Svensson
- Janne Vängman och den stora kometen (1955) - Mother Bengta
- Rätten att älska (1956) - Margareta Borg
- The Stranger from the Sky (1956) - Train passenger (uncredited)
- Det är aldrig för sent (1956) - Housemaid
- Kulla-Gulla (1956) - Mamsell Modigh
- The Hard Game (1956) - Ester, Conny's mother
- Värmlänningarna (1957) - Lisa
- Playing on the Rainbow (1958) - Marriage officiate
- Fröken Chic (1959) - Ms. Söderlund, Teacher (uncredited)
- Lita på mej älskling (1961) - Hostess at the Inn
- Loving Couples (1964) - Alexandra Vind-Frija
- ...för vänskaps skull... (1965) - Brita, Eva's mother
- The Corridor (1968) - Mrs. Olsson
- City of My Dreams (1976) - Tvätt-Johanna

== Bibliography ==
- Soila, Tytti. The Cinema of Scandinavia. Wallflower Press, 2005.
