= Synnöve Solbakken (1957 film) =

1957 film

- Directed by: Gunnar Hellström
- Written by: Olle Mattson; Gunnar Hellström
- Based on: Synnöve Solbakken by Bjørnstjerne Bjørnson
- Produced by: Rune Waldekranz
- Starring: Synnøve Strigen; Harriet Andersson; Edvin Adolphson
- Cinematography: Sven Nykvist
- Edited by: Lennart Wallén
- Music by: Torbjörn Lundquist
- Production company: Sandrews
- Distributed by: Sandrew-Baumanfilm
- Release date: 25 November 1957
- Running time: 97 minutes
- Country: Sweden
- Language: Swedish

Synnöve Solbakken is a 1957 Swedish drama film directed by Gunnar Hellström and starring Synnøve Strigen, Harriet Andersson and Edvin Adolphson. It was shot at the Centrumateljéerna Studios in Stockholm and on location around Gudbrandsdalen in Norway. The film's sets and costumes were designed by the art director Harald Garmland. It is based on the 1857 novel of the same title novel of the same title by Norwegian writer Bjørnstjerne Bjørnson.

== Cast ==
- Synnøve Strigen as Synnöve Solbakken
- Harriet Andersson as Ingrid Granliden
- Edvin Adolphson as Sämund Granliden
- Gunnar Hellström as Aslak
- Bengt Brunskog as Thorbjörn Granliden
- Ove Tjernberg as Knut Nordhaug
- Olga Appellöf as Ingeborg Granliden
- Birgitta Valberg as Karen Solbakken
- Kolbjörn Knudsen as Knut's Father
- Oscar Ljung as Guttorm Solbakken
- Gunnar Sjöberg as Doctor
- Malou Fredén as Young Synnöve
- Leif Nilsson as Young Torbjörn
- Kenneth Synnerud as Young Knut
- Börje Bergquist as Knut's Partner
- Kurt Emke as Farm Hand at Nordhaug
- Olle Hilding as Priest
- Stig Johanson as Guest at the Wedding
- Birger Lensander as Guest at the Wedding
- John Melin as Bellringer
- Stina Ståhle as Knut's Mother
- Mona Åstrand as Knut's Sister

== Bibliography ==
- Qvist, Per Olov & von Bagh, Peter. Guide to the Cinema of Sweden and Finland. Greenwood Publishing Group, 2000.
- Wright, Rochelle. The Visible Wall: Jews and Other Ethnic Outsiders in Swedish Film. SIU Press, 1998.
