= While the City Sleeps (1950 film) =

1950 film

- Film poster
- Directed by: Lars-Eric Kjellgren
- Screenplay by: Per Anders Fogelström
- Based on: Ligister; 1949 novel by Per Anders Fogelström
- Starring: Sven-Eric Gamble; Inga Landgré; Adolf Jahr
- Cinematography: Martin Bodin
- Edited by: Oscar Rosander
- Music by: Stig Rybrant
- Production company: Svensk Filmindustri
- Distributed by: Svensk Filmindustri
- Release date: 8 September 1950
- Running time: 102 minutes
- Country: Sweden
- Language: Swedish

While the City Sleeps (Swedish: Medan staden sover), is a 1950 Swedish crime drama film directed by Lars-Eric Kjellgren and starring Sven-Eric Gamble, Inga Landgré and Adolf Jahr. It is based on the novel Ligister ( "Gangsters") by Per Anders Fogelström, who also wrote the screenplay for the film. The well-known Swedish director Ingmar Bergman provided some input on the film. It was shot at the Råsunda Studios in Stockholm. The film's sets were designed by the art director Nils Svenwall.

== Plot summary ==
The story centres around Jompa, who is unemployed and lives with his parents.

He is the leader of a youth gang that frequents nightclubs and cafes and engages in petty crimes.

During a poker game, he becomes indebted to Kalle Lund, a crime boss, who gives him an opportunity to settle his debt by engaging in a bigger crime.

== Cast ==
- Sven-Eric Gamble as Jompa
- Inga Landgré as Iris Lindström
- Adolf Jahr as Iris' father
- Elof Ahrle as Manager at Lind Bilservice
- John Elfström as Jompa's father
- Hilding Gavle as Fencer
- Carl Ström as Hansson, janitor
- Ulf Palme as Kalle Lund
- Barbro Hiort af Ornäs as Rutan
- Märta Dorff as Iris' mother
- Ilse-Nore Tromm as Jompa's mother
- Ulla Smidje as Asta
- Hans Sundberg as Knatten Gustafsson
- Arne Ragneborn as Richard 'Sune' Sundberg
- Lennart Lundh as Gunnar 'Slampen' Lindström
- Hans Dahlberg as Sven-Erik 'Lång-Sam' Samuelsson
- Åke Hylén as Per 'Pekå' Knutsson
- Rolf Bergström as Gunnar
- Arthur Fischer as Police Officer
- Ebba Flygare as The Fence's Wife
- Gunnar Hellström as Young Man in Restaurant
- Julius Jacobsen as Restaurant Pianist
- Henrik Schildt as Worker at Lind Bilservice
- Alf Östlund as Andersson
- Harriet Andersson as Young Girl
- Mona Geijer-Falkner as Hostess
- Börje Mellvig as Prosecutor
- Olav Riégo as Judge
- Meta Velander as Cafe Waitress
