= Lars-Eric Kjellgren =

Swedish screenwriter and film director

- Born: 28 August 1918; Arvika, Värmlands län, Sweden
- Died: 10 February 2003 (aged 84); Stockholm, Stockholms län, Sweden
- Other name: Lars-Erik August Kjellgren
- Occupations: Director, Screenwriter
- Years active: 1942-1959 (film)

Lars-Eric Kjellgren (1918–2003) was a Swedish screenwriter and film director.

== Selected filmography ==
- Night in Port (1943)
- Don't Give Up (1947)
- Private Bom (1948)
- Father Bom (1949)
- While the City Sleeps (1950)
- Customs Officer Bom (1951)
- Blondie, Beef and the Banana (1952)
- Say It with Flowers (1952)
- Bom the Flyer (1952)
- Hidden in the Fog (1953)
- No Man's Woman (1953)
- Violence (1955)
- The Hard Game (1956)
- Far till sol och vår (1957)
- Night Light (1957)
- Playing on the Rainbow (1958)
- Crime in Paradise (1959)

== Bibliography ==
- Mariah Larsson & Anders Marklund. Swedish Film: An Introduction and Reader. Nordic Academic Press, 2010.
