= Playing on the Rainbow =

1958 film

- Directed by: Lars-Eric Kjellgren
- Written by: Vilgot Sjöman
- Starring: Mai Zetterling; Alf Kjellin; Birger Malmsten
- Cinematography: Gunnar Fischer
- Edited by: Oscar Rosander
- Music by: Bengt Hallberg; Erik Nordgren
- Production company: Svensk Filmindustri
- Distributed by: Svensk Filmindustri
- Release date: 25 August 1958
- Running time: 92 minutes
- Country: Sweden
- Language: Swedish

Playing on the Rainbow (Swedish: Lek på regnbågen) is a 1958 Swedish drama film directed by Lars-Eric Kjellgren and starring Mai Zetterling, Alf Kjellin and Birger Malmsten. It was shot at the Råsunda Studios in Stockholm. The film's sets were designed by the art director P.A. Lundgren.

== Cast ==
- Mai Zetterling as Vanja Ringqvist
- Alf Kjellin as Björn Rådström
- Birger Malmsten as Hasse Eriksson
- Gunlög Hagberg as Barbro Axelsson
- Isa Quensel as Björn's Mother
- Claes Thelander as Hannes Holmén
- Else-Marie Brandt as Björn's mistress
- Märta Dorff as Marriage officiate
- Lars Egge as Judge
- Inga Landgré as Red-headed woman
- Bo Samuelsson as Sven-Erik
- Gunnar Sjöberg as Prosecutor
- Tor Borong a s Man drinking beer
- Hans Dahlberg as Guest
- Björn Gustafson as Student
- Nils Jacobsson as Shop-assistant
- John Norrman as Sailor in need of help
- Bellan Roos as Telephone operator
- Håkan Serner as The chairman of the film studio
- Kerstin Widgren as Student

== Bibliography ==
- Qvist, Per Olov & von Bagh, Peter. Guide to the Cinema of Sweden and Finland. Greenwood Publishing Group, 2000.
