= Violence (1955 film) =

1955 film

- Directed by: Lars-Eric Kjellgren
- Written by: Lars-Eric Kjellgren; Olle Länsberg
- Based on: Gänget by Ingvar Wahlén
- Produced by: Allan Ekelund
- Starring: Lars Ekborg; Doris Svedlund; Gunvor Pontén
- Cinematography: Åke Dahlqvist
- Edited by: Oscar Rosander
- Music by: Erik Nordgren
- Production company: Svensk Filmindustri
- Distributed by: Svensk Filmindustri
- Release date: 26 September 1955
- Running time: 111 minutes
- Country: Sweden
- Language: Swedish

Violence (Swedish: Våld) is a 1955 Swedish drama film directed by Lars-Eric Kjellgren and starring Lars Ekborg, Doris Svedlund and Gunvor Pontén. It was shot at the Råsunda Studios in Stockholm. The film's sets were designed by the art director P.A. Lundgren.

== Synopsis ==
The action takes place between 1938 and 1940. Klas Rylén, a volunteer in the Swedish Army, is facing a court martial for refusing to take up arms as a conscientious objector. He recalls the events of the past two years that have led him to this state at a time when much of Europe is being engulfed in the Second World War except for Neutral Sweden.

== Cast ==
- Lars Ekborg as Klas Rylén
- Doris Svedlund as Vera Nilsson
- Gunvor Pontén as Helen Ivarson
- Sven-Eric Gamble as Norin
- Helge Hagerman as Captain Fränne
- Carl-Olof Alm as Enok Mellberg
- Per Sjöstrand as Sjunnesson
- Lars Hofgård as Ljung
- Ragnar Klange as Ivarson
- Kåre Santesson as Broman
- Karl Erik Flens as Sgt. Råby
- Märta Dorff as Vera's mother
- Lars Egge as Judge
- Gösta Prüzelius as District attorney
- Josua Bengtson as Klas' grandfather
- Gunlög Hagberg as Girl
- Roland Hedlund as Officer
- Hildur Lindberg a s Waitress
- Sten Mattsson as Soldier
- Jan-Olof Rydqvist as Andersson
- Håkan Serner as Officer
- John Starck as Man at bridge

== Bibliography ==
- Krawc, Alfred. International Directory of Cinematographers, Set- and Costume Designers in Film: Denmark, Finland, Norway, Sweden (from the beginnings to 1984). Saur, 1986.
