= Line Six =

1958 film

- Directed by: Bengt Blomgren
- Written by: Bengt Blomgren
- Produced by: Bertil Jernberg
- Starring: Margit Carlqvist; Åke Grönberg; Inger Juel
- Cinematography: Karl-Erik Alberts
- Edited by: Eric Nordemar
- Music by: Bengt-Arne Wallin
- Production company: Fortuna Film
- Distributed by: Svea Film
- Release date: 6 October 1958
- Running time: 96 minutes
- Country: Sweden
- Language: Swedish

Line Six (Swedish: Linje sex) is a 1958 Swedish thriller film directed by Bengt Blomgren and starring Margit Carlqvist, Åke Grönberg and Inger Juel. It was shot at the Metronome Studios in Stocksund and on location in Gothenburg and Stockholm. The film's sets were designed by the art director Nils Nilsson.

== Cast ==
- Margit Carlqvist as Louise Berg
- Åke Grönberg as Charlie
- Inger Juel as Margareta
- Bengt Brunskog as Björn
- Sten Gester as Ernie
- Carin Lundquist as Björn's mother
- Jessie Flaws as Waitress
- Sven-Olof Bern as Dr. Flodin
- Gösta Prüzelius as Office manager
- Ulla-Britta Frölander as Berit

== Bibliography ==
- Wredlund, Bertil & Lindfors, Rolf. Långfilm i Sverige: 1950–1959. Proprius, 1979.
