= Dreams (1955 film) =

1955 film by Ingmar Bergman

- Theatrical release poster
- Directed by: Ingmar Bergman
- Written by: Ingmar Bergman
- Produced by: Rune Waldekranz
- Starring: Eva Dahlbeck; Harriet Andersson; Gunnar Björnstrand
- Cinematography: Hilding Bladh
- Edited by: Carl-Olov Skeppstedt
- Release date: 22 August 1955
- Running time: 87 minutes
- Country: Sweden
- Language: Swedish

Dreams (Swedish: Kvinnodröm) is a 1955 Swedish drama film written and directed by Ingmar Bergman.

== Plot ==
Susanne is the owner of a model agency in Stockholm. Doris, her most popular model, has an argument with her fiancé, Palle, just before she goes with Susanne to Gothenburg to be photographed in a new collection.

In Gothenburg Doris meets an aging Consul, who sees in her a striking resemblance to his wife, now in a mental hospital. The Consul gratifies Doris's desires for fine clothes and jewelry, and the two spend a strenuously exciting day together, until his daughter arrives and ruthlessly exposes her father's egotism.

Susanne has meanwhile telephoned her ex-lover Henrik and arranged a rendezvous with him. Henrik reluctantly visits her. They have sex and are planning to resume their relationship when his wife arrives.

She proves conclusively that Henrik is a weakling. Disillusioned, Susanne returns with Doris to Stockholm, where Doris's fiancé waits.

== Cast ==
- Eva Dahlbeck as Susanne
- Harriet Andersson as Doris
- Gunnar Björnstrand as Otto Sönderby
- Ulf Palme as Mr. Henrik Lobelius
- Inga Landgré as Mrs. Lobelius
- Benkt-Åke Benktsson as Mr. Magnus
- Sven Lindberg as Palle Palt
- Kerstin Hedeby as Marianne

== Reception ==
Dreams is one of the few Ingmar Bergman films to have received lukewarm reviews (as opposed to a positive reception). The film ranked 6th on Cahiers du Cinéma's Top 10 Films of the Year List in 1958. Review aggregator Rotten Tomatoes reports 40% approval among five critics.
