= The Hard Game =

1956 film

- Directed by: Lars-Eric Kjellgren
- Written by: Olle Länsberg
- Produced by: Allan Ekelund
- Starring: Sven-Eric Gamble; Ann-Marie Gyllenspetz; Åke Grönberg
- Cinematography: Lasse Björne; Gunnar Fischer
- Edited by: Ingemar Ejve
- Music by: Thore Swanerud
- Production company: Svensk Filmindustri
- Distributed by: Svensk Filmindustri
- Release date: 10 September 1956
- Running time: 106 minutes
- Country: Sweden
- Language: Swedish

The Hard Game (Swedish: Den hårda leken) is a 1956 Swedish sports drama film directed by Lars-Eric Kjellgren and starring Sven-Eric Gamble, Ann-Marie Gyllenspetz and Åke Grönberg. It was shot at the Råsunda Studios in Stockholm and on location in Gothenburg. The film's sets were designed by the art director P.A. Lundgren.

== Synopsis ==
A promising young working-class boxer Conny Persson is pushed hard by his unscrupulous manager Andy Ekström. When Conny meets and falls in love with Margit Söderberg, she tries to persuade him to quit the cynical boxing profession and concentrate on running a flower shop with her

== Cast ==
- Sven-Eric Gamble as Conny Persson
- Ann-Marie Gyllenspetz as Margit Söderberg
- Åke Grönberg as Andy Ekström
- John Elfström as William Persson
- Märta Dorff as Ester, Conny's mother
- Lissi Alandh as Sally, waitress
- Sten Gester as Viking Svensson
- Sissi Kaiser as Karin
- Arne Källerud as Pram
- Erik Strandmark as Wille Thoren
- Britta Brunius as Margit's mother
- Olav Riégo as Margit's father
- Henrik Schildt as Redman
- Stig Johanson as Brollan
- Erik Molin as Bigge Ek
- Bengt Ahlin as Boxer
- Sten Ardenstam as Guest at café
- Horace Brandt as Boxing referee
- Jens Brandt as Boxer
- Gösta Brodén as Photographer
- Eskil Engstrand as Boxer
- Jerry Eriksson as Boxer
- Elisabet Falk as Britta Lindström
- Gustaf Gustafson as Florist
- Jan Henrikson as Boxer
- Willy Karlsson as Florist
- Gunnar 'Knas' Lindkvist as Man at fairground
- Charlie Löfman as Nisse Sandberg
- Gösta Malmborg as Man with gong
- Charles Moore as Black boxer
- Gunnar Nielsen as Kalle Johansson
- John Nilsson as Jonne Ring
- Nils Olsson as Boxer
- Tord Peterson as Fimpen
- Hanny Schedin as Margit's friend
- Olle Seijbold as Photographer
- Gunnar Thim as Sotarn
- Ivar Wahlgren as Backman
- Boris Wiklund as Boxer

== Bibliography ==
- Crosson, Seán (ed.).Sport, Film and National Culture. Routledge, 2020.
- Qvist, Per Olov & von Bagh, Peter. Guide to the Cinema of Sweden and Finland. Greenwood Publishing Group, 2000.
