= Bengt Brunskog =

Swedish actor (1920–2000)

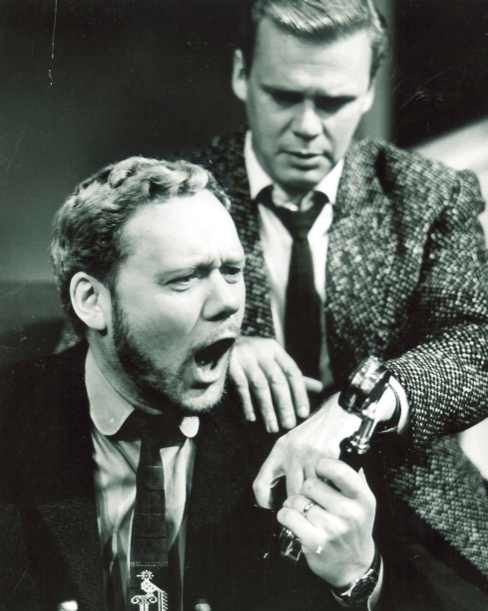
- Brunskog (right) with Olof Thunberg performing at the Malmö City Theatre in 1960
- Born: 5 May 1920; Stockholm, Sweden
- Died: 3 November 2000 (aged 80); Malmö, Sweden
- Occupation: Actor
- Years active: 1941-1988 (film & TV)

Bengt Brunskog (1920–2000) was a Swedish stage, film and television actor.

== Selected filmography ==
- Fransson the Terrible (1941)
- Katrina (1943)
- Realm of Man (1949)
- Summer with Monika (1953)
- Synnöve Solbakken (1957)
- Seventeen Years Old (1957)
- Line Six (1958)
- Mannequin in Red (1958)
- We at Väddö (1958)
- The Phantom Carriage (1958)
- Rider in Blue (1959)
- Lend Me Your Wife (1959)
- When Darkness Falls (1960)
- Loving Couples (1964)
- I, a Woman (1965)

== Bibliography ==
- Steene, Birgitta. Ingmar Bergman: A Reference Guide. Amsterdam University Press, 2005.
- Wright, Rochelle. The Visible Wall: Jews and Other Ethnic Outsiders in Swedish Film. SIU Press, 1998.
