= The Clang of the Pick =

1952 film

- Directed by: Arne Mattsson
- Written by: Volodja Semitjov
- Based on: The Clang of the Pick by Hans Hergin
- Produced by: Lennart Landheim
- Starring: Victor Sjöström; Edvin Adolphson; Margit Carlqvist
- Cinematography: Sven Thermænius
- Edited by: Carl-Olov Skeppstedt
- Music by: Sven Sköld
- Production company: Nordisk Tonefilm
- Distributed by: Nordisk Tonefilm
- Release date: 15 September 1952
- Running time: 87 minutes
- Country: Sweden
- Language: Swedish

The Clang of the Pick (Swedish: Hård klang) is a 1952 Swedish drama film directed by Arne Mattsson and starring Victor Sjöström, Edvin Adolphson and Margit Carlqvist. It was shot at the Kungsholmen Studios of Nordisk Tonefilm in Stockholm. The film's sets were designed by the art director Bibi Lindström.

== Synopsis ==
The village of Brovik on the coast of Småland in southern Sweden is transformed from a small agricultural settlement into a booming port due to the development of a granite quarrying by a German industrialist Klaus Willenhart in the late nineteenth century. By the First World War his son Frans has taken over the business and identifies strongly with the local community in neutral Sweden. By contrast his father, wife Vera and brother Gert are strongly committed to the German Empire and the cause of victory. Vera leaves Frans and goes with her brother-in-law, an on officer in the Kaiser's army, to work as a nurse.

Frans bonds with Minka, the niece of a local stonemason who bitterly resents the wealthy German family, and they ultimately become lovers. When a naval mine drifts towards the village, Frans detonates it with a rifle and is fatally wounded by shrapnel.

== Cast ==
- Victor Sjöström as Klaus Willenhart
- Edvin Adolphson as Frans Willenhart
- John Elfström as Olof Rydberg
- Margit Carlqvist as Minka
- Nils Hallberg as Teofil
- Rolf von Nauckhoff as Gert Willenhart
- Naima Wifstrand as Narrator / Clothes Saleswoman
- Eva Bergh as Vera
- Erik Hell as Johan
- Magnus Kesster as Verk-Masse
- Dagmar Ebbesen as Hanna
- Axel Högel as Svenske Fredrik
- Wiktor Andersson as Karlsson
- Sten Mattsson as Börje
- Gösta Gustafson as Hornvall
- Svea Holst as Mrs. Karlsson
- Hedvig Lindby as Old Villager
- John Norrman as Secretary
- Birger Åsander as Arvid
- Gunnar Öhlund as Stone Mason
- Ingemar Holde as Fiddle player
- Carl-Gustaf Lindstedt as Fiddle player
- John Melin as Guest at the party

== Bibliography ==
- Sundholm, John. Historical Dictionary of Scandinavian Cinema. Scarecrow Press, 2012.
