= Last Pair Out =

1956 film by Alf Sjöberg

- Directed by: Alf Sjöberg
- Written by: Ingmar Bergman
- Produced by: Allan Ekelund
- Starring: Eva Dahlbeck; Harriet Andersson; Bibi Andersson
- Cinematography: Martin Bodin
- Edited by: Oscar Rosander
- Release date: 12 November 1956
- Running time: 103 minutes
- Country: Sweden
- Language: Swedish

Last Pair Out (Swedish: Sista paret ut), is a 1956 Swedish drama film directed by Alf Sjöberg and written by Ingmar Bergman. It was entered into the 7th Berlin International Film Festival.

== Cast ==
- Eva Dahlbeck as Susanna Dahlin
- Harriet Andersson as Anita
- Bibi Andersson as Kerstin
- Björn Bjelfvenstam as Bo Dahlin
- Jarl Kulle as Dr. Farell
- Olof Widgren as Hans Dahlin
- Aino Taube as Kerstin's mother
- Hugo Björne as Professor Jacobi
- Jan-Olof Strandberg as Claes Berg
- Märta Arbin as Grandmother
- Jullan Kindahl as Alma
