= Marianne (1953 film) =

1953 film

- Directed by: Egil Holmsen
- Written by: Olle Hellbom
- Starring: Margit Carlqvist; Gunnar Hellström; Eva Stiberg
- Cinematography: Ingvar Borild
- Edited by: Wic Kjellin
- Music by: Harry Arnold
- Production company: Europa Film
- Distributed by: Europa Film
- Release date: 24 September 1953
- Running time: 103 minutes
- Country: Sweden
- Language: Swedish

Marianne is a 1953 Swedish drama film directed by Egil Holmsen and starring Margit Carlqvist, Gunnar Hellström and Eva Stiberg. It was shot at the Sundbyberg Studios in Stockholm.

The film was shot during May and June 1953 at Europafilm's studio in Sundbyberg, as well as at Enskede Higher General School, the Gazell Club jazz cellar in Old Town, Skeppsbron and Södermalm. Production manager was Olle Brunæus, scriptwriter Olle Hellbom, photographer Ingvar Borild and editor Wic' Kjellin. The music was composed by Harry Arnold. The film premiered on September 24, 1953, at the Anglais cinema in Stockholm. It is 103 minutes long and suitable for ages 15 and up.

== Cast ==
- Margit Carlqvist as Marianne Ekman
- Gunnar Hellström as Birger Wessel
- Eva Stiberg as Andelius
- Jan Malmsjö as Jojje
- Isa Quensel as Marianne's Mother
- Olle Hilding as Erik Ekman
- Olav Riégo as Headmaster
- Meg Westergren as Birgitta
- Börje Mellvig as John
- Lissi Alandh as Elisabeth
- Paul Andersson as Poet
- Jan Bark as Trombonist
- Lars Burman as French Teacher
- Hans Dahlberg as Class Mate
- Märta Dorff as Birger's Mother
- Verner Edberg as Bosse
- Leif Hedberg as Jerka
- Barbro Hörberg as Barbro
- Karl-Erik 'Cacka' Israelsson as Owner of the club
- Ove Kant as Stickan
- Åke Karlung as Yoga practioneer
- Göran Lundquist as Lasse Ekman
- Sangrid Nerf as Model
- Börje Nyberg as Chemistry Teacher
- Håkan Serner as Marianne's Class Mate
- Gunnel Sporr as Class Mate
- Katarina Taikon as Marianne's Class Mate
- Svante Thuresson as Drummer
- Kerstin Tidelius as Girl at club
- Catrin Westerlund as Annika
- Bengt Ekerot as Companion

== Bibliography ==
- Krawc, Alfred. International Directory of Cinematographers, Set- and Costume Designers in Film: Denmark, Finland, Norway, Sweden (from the beginnings to 1984). Saur, 1986.
