= No Man's Woman (1953 film) =

1953 film

- Directed by: Lars-Eric Kjellgren
- Written by: Gardar Sahlberg
- Based on: No Man's Woman by Bernhard Nordh
- Produced by: Allan Ekelund
- Starring: Alf Kjellin; Birger Malmsten; Ann-Marie Gyllenspetz
- Cinematography: Åke Dahlqvist; Martin Bodin
- Edited by: Carl-Olov Skeppstedt
- Music by: Sven Sköld
- Production company: Svensk Filmindustri
- Distributed by: Svensk Filmindustri
- Release date: 9 November 1953
- Running time: 104 minutes
- Country: Sweden
- Language: Swedish

No Man's Woman (Swedish: Ingen mans kvinna) is a 1953 Swedish drama film directed by Lars-Eric Kjellgren and starring Alf Kjellin, Birger Malmsten and Ann-Marie Gyllenspetz. It was shot at the Råsunda Studios in Stockholm with location shooting also taking place in Norway. The film's sets were designed by the art director P.A. Lundgren.

== Cast ==
- Alf Kjellin as Arne Persson
- Birger Malmsten as Erland Klemensson
- Ann-Marie Gyllenspetz as Imber Ersson
- Aurore Palmgren as Arne's Mother
- Lissi Alandh as Judith Henriksson
- Max von Sydow as Olof
- Kolbjörn Knudsen as Jonas Persson
- Tryggve Larssen as Lapp-Nicke
- Ella Hval as Lapp-Kari
- Ingerid Vardund as Mimmi
- Marit Halset as Åse
- Märta Dorff as Mrs. Henriksson
- Olle Hilding as Henriksson, Judith's father
- Axel Högel as Vicar
- Uno Larsson as Verger
- Josua Bengtson as School Master
- Wilma Malmlöf as Woman at Henriksson's

== Bibliography ==
- Qvist, Per Olov & von Bagh, Peter. Guide to the Cinema of Sweden and Finland. Greenwood Publishing Group, 2000.
