= Wild Birds =

1955 film

- Directed by: Alf Sjöberg
- Written by: Alf Sjöberg
- Based on: Nisse Bortom by Bengt Anderberg
- Produced by: Allan Ekelund
- Starring: Maj-Britt Nilsson; Per Oscarsson; Ulf Palme
- Cinematography: Martin Bodin
- Edited by: Lennart Wallén
- Music by: Dag Wirén
- Production company: Svensk Filmindustri
- Distributed by: Svensk Filmindustri
- Release date: 22 August 1955
- Running time: 100 minutes
- Country: Sweden
- Language: Swedish

Wild Birds (Swedish: Vildfåglar) is a 1955 Swedish drama film directed by Alf Sjöberg and starring Maj-Britt Nilsson, Per Oscarsson and Ulf Palme. It was shot at the Råsunda Studios in Stockholm and on location in Gothenburg. The film's sets were designed by the art director P.A. Lundgren.

== Cast ==
- Maj-Britt Nilsson as Lena Hern
- Per Oscarsson as Nisse Bortom
- Ulf Palme as Harry
- Ulla Sjöblom as Ulla
- Gertrud Fridh as Lizzie
- Jane Friedmann as Ester
- Eva Stiberg as Mrs. Carlsson
- Kolbjörn Knudsen as Captain Hern
- Helge Hagerman as Åke Carlsson
- Erik Strandmark as Furniture dealer
- Allan Edwall as Fiorentino
- Tommy Nilsson as Stickan
- Gunnar Collin as Berra
- Jan-Olof Strandberg as Moje
- Bengt Blomgren as Gunnar
- Aurore Palmgren as Mrs. Larsson
- Olof Thunberg as Caretaker
- Ernst Brunman as Caretaker
- Carin SwenssonMother
- Sten Mattsson as Spectator
- Ivar Wahlgren as Tug Skipper

== Bibliography ==
- Per Olov Qvist & Peter von Bagh, Guide to the Cinema of Sweden and Finland. Greenwood Publishing Group, 2000.
