= Bengt Blomgren =

Swedish actor, film director and screenwriter (1923–2013)

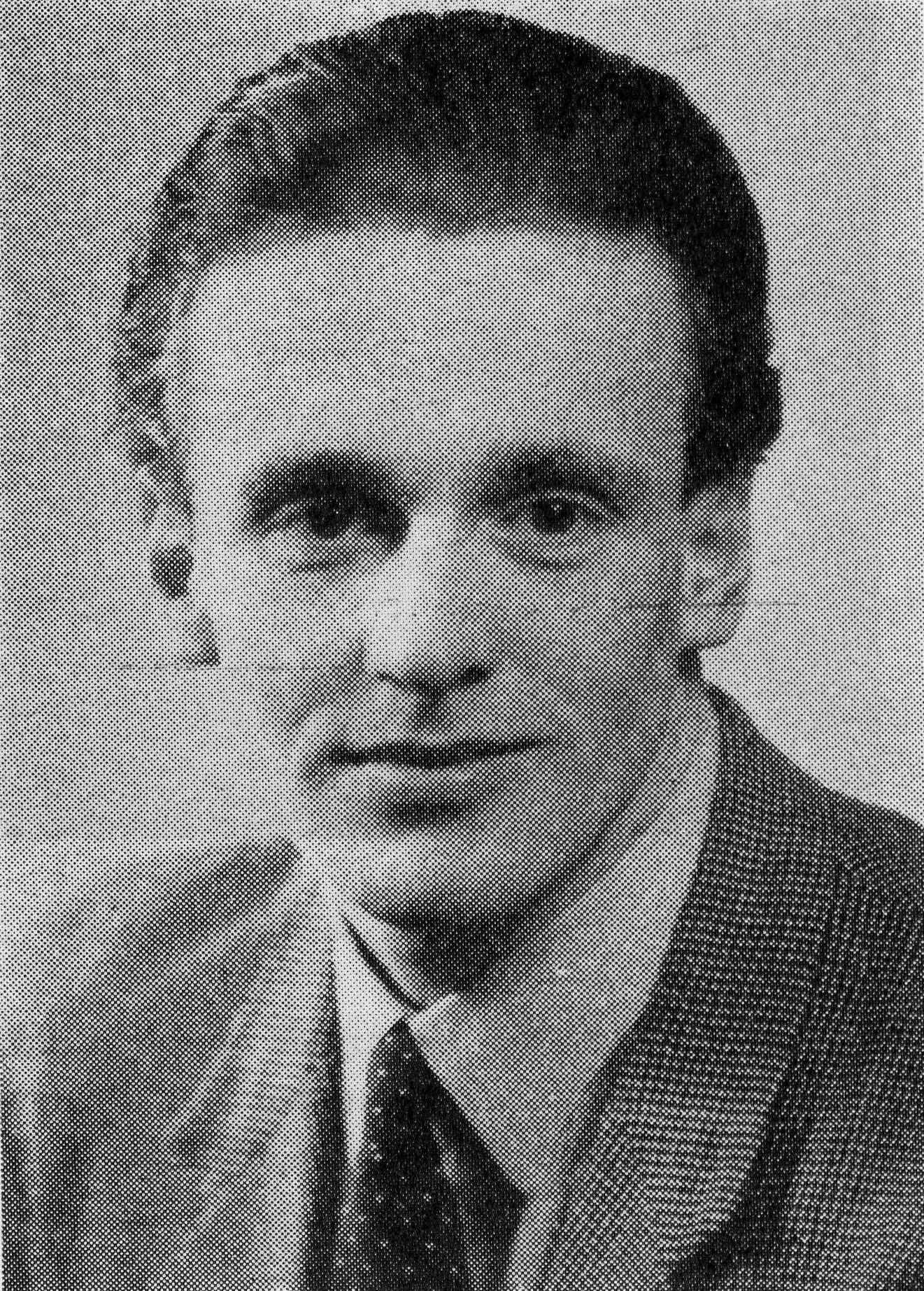
- Born: Bengt Bertil Blomgren; 15 August 1923; Stockholm, Sweden
- Died: 4 April 2013 (aged 89); Norrköping, Sweden
- Occupation: Director
- Years active: 1951-1997

Bengt Bertil Blomgren (15 August 1923 – 4 April 2013) was a Swedish actor, film director and screenwriter, born in Stockholm.

== Selected filmography ==
- 1997 - Tic Tac
- 1997 - Tre Kronor (TV series)
- 1997 - Rederiet (TV)
- 1995 - Pensionat Oskar
- 1994 - Den vite riddaren (TV)
- 1992 - Hassel – Botgörarna
- 1977 - Bröderna Lejonhjärta
- 1961 - Hällebäcks gård (also director)
- 1959 - Space Invasion of Lapland
- 1959 - Crime in Paradise
- 1958 - Brink of Life
- 1958 - Laila
- 1958 - Line Six (also screenwriter and director)
- 1957 - The Halo Is Slipping
- 1957 - Mästerdetektiven Blomkvist lever farligt
- 1956 - Det är aldrig för sent
- 1955 - Farligt löfte
- 1955 - Wild Birds
- 1955 - The Dance Hall
- 1954 - Karin Månsdotter
- 1954 - Dance in the Smoke (also director)
- 1953 - Hidden in the Fog
- 1953 - A Night in the Archipelago
- 1953 - The Chieftain of Göinge
- 1952 - Encounter with Life
- 1951 - Kvinnan bakom allt
- 1951 - In the Arms of the Sea
- 1948 - Girl from the Mountain Village
