= Secrets of Women (film) =

1952 film by Ingmar Bergman

- Theatrical release poster
- Directed by: Ingmar Bergman
- Screenplay by: Ingmar Bergman
- Story by: Gun Grut
- Produced by: Allan Ekelund
- Starring: Anita Björk; Maj-Britt Nilsson; Eva Dahlbeck; Birger Malmsten; Karl-Arne Holmsten; Gunnar Björnstrand
- Cinematography: Gunnar Fischer
- Edited by: Oscar Rosander
- Distributed by: AB Svensk Filmindustri (SF)
- Release date: 3 November 1952
- Running time: 103 minutes
- Country: Sweden
- Language: Swedish

Secrets of Women (Swedish: Kvinnors väntan), also known as Waiting Women, is a 1952 Swedish drama film written and directed by Ingmar Bergman. The film, which was screened within the official selection of the Venice Film Festival in 1953, is centered on youthful relationships, told in flashbacks by a group of women.

Since its release, Secrets of Women, while not regarded as one of Bergman's strongest efforts, has nonetheless received positive reviews from critics.

== Plot ==
While waiting at a table for the arrival of their husbands who happen to be the Lobelius brothers, three women, Rakel, Karin, and Marta, begin talking and share secrets.

Rakel's story Rakel is married to Eugen, and is having an affair with Kaj. One day, Kaj and Eugen return home from a shooting excursion. Rakel, professing to be disgusted by Kaj, reveals she has cheated on Eugen. Rakel tells Eugen she is not looking for his forgiveness; Eugen says he intends to expel Rakel from the house, with her possessions and an allowance. Rakel replies she is not Eugen's property. Eugen storms out with a rifle, with Rakel chasing after him, fearing he will commit suicide. When Eugen threatens to kill himself, Rakel asks an elderly neighbour to talk sense into him.

In the present, Rakel tells the women at the table she has come to think of Eugen as her child and is resolved to take care of him. Encouraged by Rakel's candor, Marta tells of her own story, her affair with Eugen's brother Martin, a painter.

Marta's story Marta learns she is pregnant, and after an appointment with a gynecologist, returns home to tell Martin. There, Martin is being visited by his brothers to inform him of their father's death. One of the brothers, Fredrik, the head of the family firm, says he is disturbed by the fact that Martin will not attend their father's funeral, and says Martin will not be given a job at the firm. When the family left, Marta tried to tell Martin of her pregnancy, but he refuses to hear the news she wants to tell him. On a date that night, he discusses his intention to part ways with Marta, and asks what she had wanted to say, but she says she was only joking about having news. They separate without Marta informing him of their expected child, and she gives birth without him.

Back at the table, Marta's sister Maj professes to like the story, but dislikes the fact that Marta and Martin reconciled, which Marta attributes to their love for each other. Karin says her story is not so much a story as a comedic episode, and proceeds to tell her tale.

Karin's story Karin accompanies her husband Fredrik to receive the crown prince at an event, and doesn't warn Fredrik that he has shaving cream in his ear the entire time. After leaving the event, the couple enter an elevator, which malfunctions and becomes stuck, trapping Fredrik and Karin inside. After the commotion, Karin is amused to see Fredrik's crushed top hat. While waiting, Fredrik asks Karin if she has ever been unfaithful, and Karin casually and quickly replies yes. She then accuses him of having an affair with a woman named Diana, and says her own confession was a lie. Fredrik says he ended the affair with Diana quickly, claiming Diana was a madwoman. Karin then admits that her claim to have cheated was somewhat true, and that she has embellished her story about Diana. They have sex in the elevator, then quickly get dressed as the elevator starts moving up to rescuers.

After the women have told their stories, Marta learns Maj is planning to run away with her lover, Henrik, son of the eldest brother Paul and his wife Annette, who was supposed to arrive with his father and uncles, but who secretly arrived earlier. Marta says she will force Maj not to leave, but Maj replies she is not a child. The men arrive as Henrik and Maj take off on a boat. Paul tells Marta to let them go, since they will return soon enough after gaining wisdom by spending the summer doing "something they think is forbidden".

== Cast ==
- Anita Björk – Rakel (Eugen's wife)
- Eva Dahlbeck – Karin (Fredrik's wife)
- Maj-Britt Nilsson – Marta (Martin's wife)
- Birger Malmsten – Martin Lobelius
- Gunnar Björnstrand – Fredrik Lobelius
- Karl-Arne Holmsten – Eugen Lobelius
- Jarl Kulle – Kaj (Rakel's lover)
- Aino Taube – Annette (Paul's wife)
- Håkan Westergren – Paul Lobelius
- Gerd Andersson – Maj (Marta's younger sister)
- Björn Bjelfvenstam – Henrik Lobelius (Paul's son)

== Release and reception ==
In 2018, The Criterion Collection released the film on Blu-ray in Region A, along with 38 other Bergman films, in the set Ingmar Bergman's Cinema.

Secrets of Women holds an 88% approval rating on review aggregator Rotten Tomatoes, based on eight critics.
