= A Lesson in Love (1954 film) =

1954 film by Ingmar Bergman

- Theatrical release poster
- Directed by: Ingmar Bergman
- Written by: Ingmar Bergman
- Produced by: Allan Ekelund
- Starring: Eva Dahlbeck; Gunnar Björnstrand; Harriet Andersson; Yvonne Lombard; Olof Winnerstrand; Åke Grönberg
- Cinematography: Martin Bodin
- Edited by: Oscar Rosander
- Distributed by: AB Svensk Filmindustri
- Release date: 4 October 1954
- Running time: 96 minutes
- Country: Sweden
- Language: Swedish

A Lesson in Love (Swedish: En lektion i kärlek) is a 1954 Swedish comedy film written and directed by Ingmar Bergman. The film is about the marriage of a gynecologist named David and his wife Marianne. The film's score was composed by Dag Wirén.

== Cast ==
- Eva Dahlbeck as Marianne Erneman
- Gunnar Björnstrand as David Erneman
- Yvonne Lombard as Susanne Verin
- Harriet Andersson as Nix
- Åke Grönberg as Carl-Adam
- Olof Winnerstrand as Professor Henrik Erneman
- Renée Björling as Svea Erneman
- John Elfström as Sam
- Birgitte Reimer as Lise
- Dagmar Ebbesen as Nurse Lisa
- Sigge Fürst as Vicar

== Reception ==
A Lesson in Love received generally positive reviews from critics. Review aggregator Rotten Tomatoes reports 100% approval (based on six critics), with an average rating of 7.2/10.

On the film's U.S. release in 1960, Bosley Crowther opined in The New York Times, that its subject "...is the complexity of love...It is a subject that Mr. Bergman expanded in his subsequent "Smiles of a Summer Night," with more wit and satiric implication. But, for a warm-up, he got off nicely here...Mr. Bergman plays around with it in such a clever and thought-provoking way that the emotional dilemma implicit in it has humor, wisdom and charm...And, as in all of his pictures, Mr. Bergman has used a cast that seems to act with inspired understanding—which means, of course, sympathy with him."
