= Gunnar Björnstrand =

Swedish actor (1909–1986)

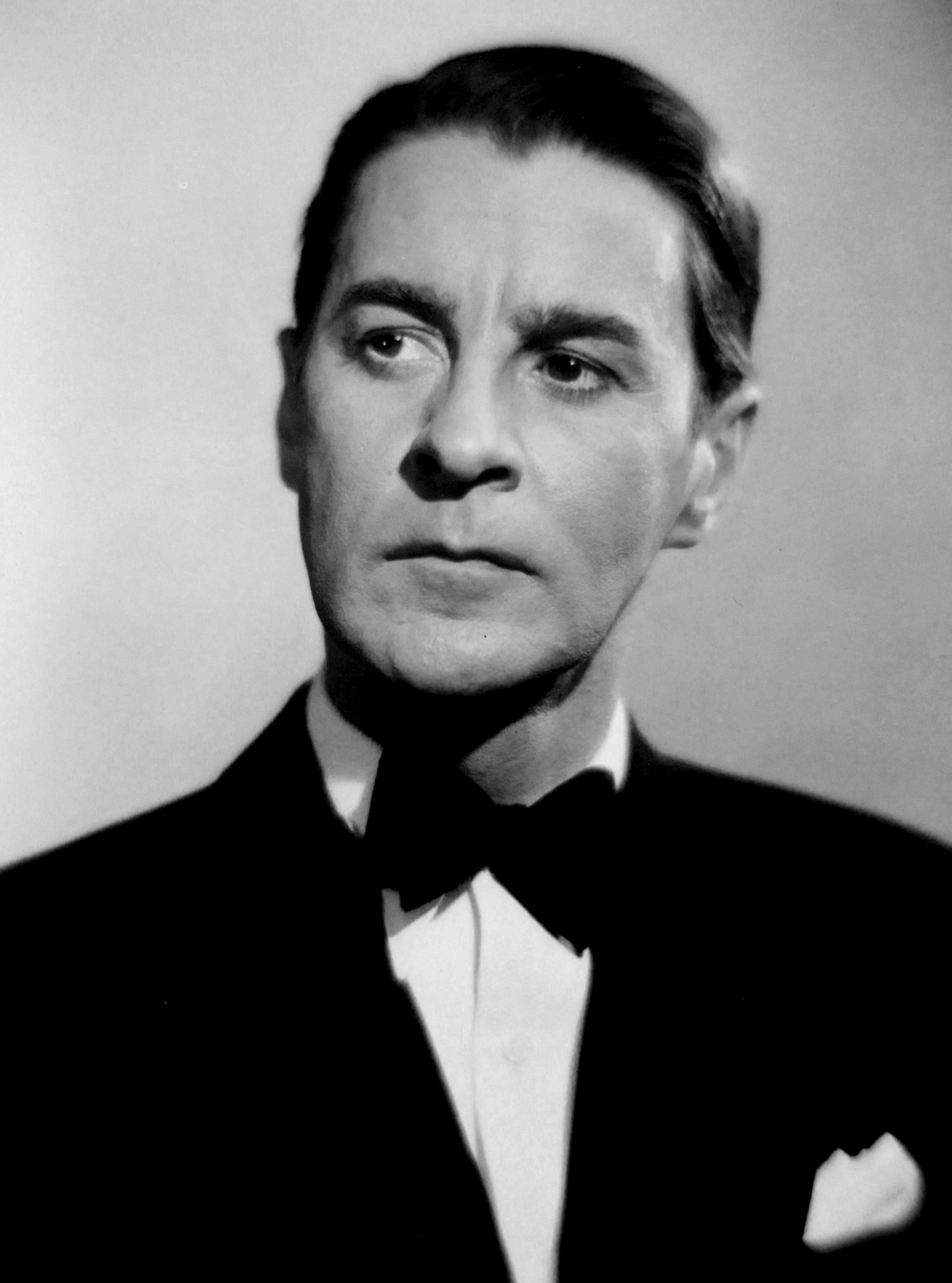
- Born: Knut Gunnar Johanson; 13 November 1909; Stockholm, Sweden
- Died: 24 May 1986 (aged 76); Djursholm, Sweden
- Occupation: Actor
- Years active: 1931–1983
- Spouse: Lillie Björnstrand (m. 1935–1986)

Knut Gunnar Johanson (13 November 1909 – 24 May 1986) was a Swedish actor known for his frequent work with writer and director Ingmar Bergman.

== Biography ==
Björnstrand was born Knut Gunnar Johanson in Stockholm as son of actor Oscar Johanson and Ella Mauléon. After his education at the Royal Dramatic Theatre's acting school, he made several appearances in theatre, film and radio. Björnstrand's first collaboration with Ingmar Bergman was the 1941 theatre production of August Strindberg's The Ghost Sonata. His first major film role was in Hampe Faustman's Natt i hamn in 1943. After signing a contract with Svensk Filmindustri, he was offered mainly parts in comedies, including Bergman's Smiles of a Summer Night (1955). In 1957, however, he appeared in two dramatic roles for Bergman, in The Seventh Seal and Wild Strawberries and, notably, Winter Light (1962). He regularly starred in other films by Bergman until 1968, when his work for the director became infrequent. He also played major roles at the Stockholm City Theatre and in private theaters. In later years, due to the consequences of a stroke, Björnstrand avoided long-term contracts, and focused on theatre and television work. His last film was Bergman's Fanny and Alexander (1982): since he was suffering from memory loss at the time, the production was a difficult one for him. Björnstrand died in Stockholm in 1986.

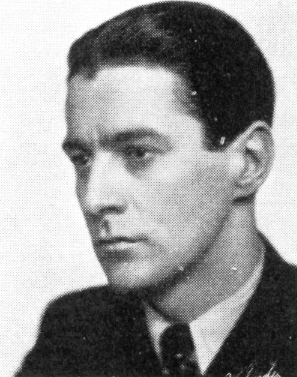
Björnstrand in 1940

In 1983 he won the Ingmar Bergman Award at the 19th Guldbagge Awards ceremony.

Björnstrand was married to actress and writer Lillie Björnstrand. They had three daughters, Kristina, Gabrielle and Veronica Björnstrand. Veronica has also acted on stage and TV. Björnstrand was also politically active and participated in protests against the Vietnam War. He was a Roman Catholic and is buried in the Northern Cemetery of Solna.

== Filmography ==
- The False Millionaire (1931) as Member of the choir (uncredited)
- Mon coeur et ses millions (1931) as Un choriste (uncredited)
- Ship Ahoy! (1931) as Young man (uncredited)
- His Life's Match (1932) as Student carrying 'Nicken' (uncredited)
- International Match (1932) as Young student watching competition (uncredited)
- Fired (1934) as Kirre Skoglund (uncredited)
- The People of Bergslagen (1937) as Birthday guest (uncredited)
- Vi som går scenvägen (1938) as A Man (uncredited)
- Panik (1939) as Bank Manager Ryder
- The Two of Us (1939) as Doctor (uncredited)
- Mot nya tider (1939) as August Palm's Associate (uncredited)
- Heroes in Yellow and Blue (1940) as Sgt. Kristian (uncredited)
- June Night (1940) as Journalist (uncredited)
- A Real Man (1940) as Clerk (uncredited)
- Her Melody (1940) as Miss Lindenstjärnas fiance (uncredited)
- Alle man på post (1940) as Military Doctor
- The Ghost Reporter (1941) as Sausage Factory Engineer (uncredited)
- Snapphanar (1941) as Soldier (uncredited)
- Adventurer (1942) as Count Conti
- General von Döbeln (1942) as Löjtnant Bäckström
- Night in Port (1943) as Sven Eriksson
- I Killed (1943) as Lindén
- Appassionata (1944) as Svensson, Editor of Vecko-Bilden (uncredited)
- Live Dangerously (1944) as Hahn
- My People Are Not Yours (1944) as Major Rolf von Ritter
- Torment (1944, dir. Alf Sjöberg) as Teacher (uncredited)
- Nyordning på Sjögårda (1944) as Felix Palmer
- Vad vet ni om Sussie (1945) as Harry Hellberg
- I som här inträden... (1945) as Hagman
- Peggy on a Spree (1946) as Harald Haraldsson
- Kristin Commands (1946) as Dr. Westman Senior / Vilhelm Westman
- Incorrigible (1946) as Dr. Bertil Langenfeldt
- It Rains on Our Love (1946) as Mr. Purman
- While the Door Was Locked (1946) as Erik Sahlen
- The Bride Came Through the Ceiling (1947) as Sune Eriksson
- Pappa sökes (1947) as Shoe-shiner Tom, 'Plutten'
- Soldier's Reminder (1947) as Sgt. Löfgren
- One Swallow Does Not Make a Summer (1947) as 40-talisten
- Här kommer vi... (1947) as Actor Bob Hill, aka Robert Berg
- Two Women (1947) as Bengt Larsson
- Music in Darkness (1948) as Klasson
- Each to His Own Way (1948) as Sture Widman
- A Swedish Tiger (1948) as Hans Wolff
- Lilla Märta kommer tillbaka (1948) as Kaptenen
- Private Bom (1948) as Korpral Berglund
- Playing Truant (1949) as Bertil Kronberg
- The Girl from the Third Row (1949) as Dr. Edvin Burelius
- Father Bom (1949) as Sportsman Fritjof Krafft
- My Sister and I (1950) as Architect Gunnar Stenwall
- Fiancée for Hire (1950) as Actor Julius Brumse
- The Kiss on the Cruise (1950) as Film Director Lasse Brenner
- The Quartet That Split Up (1950) as Engineer Planertz
- The White Cat (1950) as Jarl Eksell
- Customs Officer Bom (1951) as Frans Melin, aka Hamn-Casanova
- The Nuthouse (1951) as Armékapten
- Livat på luckan (1951) as Conscript
- Say It with Flowers (1952) as Oskar Blomkvist
- Möte med livet (1952) as Narrator (voice)
- One Fiancée at a Time (1952) as Valentin Fredriksson-Frisk
- Secrets of Women (1952) as Fredrik Lobelius
- Bom the Flyer (1952) as Sgt. Niklas Slevbrink
- The Green Lift (1952) as Malte Lövman
- Dance, My Doll (1953) as Zdenko Zapatil
- We Three Debutantes (1953) as Director Brummer
- Sawdust and Tinsel (1953) as Mr. Sjuberg
- The Glass Mountain (1953) as Dr. Dalander
- Flottans glada gossar (1954) as Shipowner Ludvig Ekman
- Seger i mörker (1954) as Henrik Kugelström
- A Lesson in Love (1954) as David Erneman
- Gabrielle (1954) as Robert Holmén
- Uncle's (1955) as Acke Kullerstedt
- Dreams (1955) as Otto Sönderby, Consul
- Smiles of a Summer Night (1955) as Fredrik Egerman
- Det är aldrig för sent (1956) as Professor Rocke
- Seventh Heaven (1956) as Ernst C:son Kruuse, major
- The Biscuit (1956) as Freddie Braxenhjelm
- The Seventh Seal (1957) as Jöns, squire
- Night Light (1957, dir. Lars-Eric Kjellgren) as Mr. Purman
- Summer Place Wanted (1957) as Lawyer Gustaf Dahlström
- Wild Strawberries (1957) as Dr. Evald Borg
- You Are My Adventure (1958) as Tore Hall
- Miss April (1958) as Marcus Arwidson
- The Magician (1958) as Dr. Vergerus, Minister of Health
- Swinging at the Castle (1959) as Agne C:son Stressberg
- Crime in Paradise (1959) as Adam 'A.P.' Palmquist
- Heaven and Pancake (1959) as Ernst C:son Kruuse
- Pirates on the Malonen (1959) as 'Greven'
- The Devil's Eye (1960) as Actor
- Through a Glass Darkly (1961) as David
- The Pleasure Garden (1961, dir. Alf Kjellin) as David Samuel Franzén
- Winter Light (1962) as Tomas Ericsson
- Lyckodrömmen (1963) as Sebastian
- Min kära är en ros (1963) as Georg Ehnström
- The Dress (1964) as Helmer Berg
- Äktenskapsbrottaren (1964) as Herr Fotograf Fäger
- Loving Couples (1964) as Dr. Jacob Lewin
- My Sister, My Love (1966) as Count Schwartz
- Träfracken (1966) as Dr. Rune Wester
- Persona (1966) as Mr. Vogler
- Here Is Your Life (1966) as Lundgren
- Hagbard and Signe (1967) as King Sigvor
- Stimulantia (1967) as Paul Hartman
- Tofflan (1967) as Engineer Morgan Alm
- The Girls (1968) as Hugo
- Shame (1968) as överste Jacobi, borgmästare
- Pappa varför är du arg? Du gjorde likadant själv när du var ung (1968) as Adm. Carl
- The Rite (1969, TV Movie) as Hans Winkelmann
- Blow Hot, Blow Cold (1969) as Prof. Gunnar Lindmark
- Lockfågeln (1971) as Maj. Swedenhielm
- Pistol (1973) as Alisia's Friend
- Face to Face (1976) as The Grandfather
- Tabu (1977) as Rådmanskan
- Autumn Sonata (1978) as Paul
- Charlotte Löwensköld (1979) as Rural Dean Forsius
- Avskedet (1982) as Morfadern
- Fanny and Alexander (1982) as Filip Landahl
