= Swinging at the Castle =

- Directed by: Alf Kjellin
- Written by: Stig Olin; Hasse Ekman
- Starring: Alice Babs; Sven Lindberg; Lars Lönndahl; Yvonne Lombard
- Cinematography: Gunnar Fischer
- Edited by: Ingemar Ejve
- Music by: Bengt Hallberg; Charles Redland
- Release date: 9 March 1959
- Running time: 96 min
- Country: Sweden
- Language: Swedish

Swinging at the Castle (Det svänger på slottet) is a 1959 Swedish comedy film directed by Alf Kjellin and starring Alice Babs, Sven Lindberg, Lars Lönndahl and Yvonne Lombard. It was shot at the Råsunda Studios in Stockholm. The film's sets were designed by the art director P.A. Lundgren.

== Cast ==
- Alice Babs as Inga 'Trollet' Larsson
- Sven Lindberg as Svante Lamander
- Lars Lönndahl as Kurre Ström
- Yvonne Lombard as Sophie Gesping
- Gunnar Björnstrand as Agne C:son Stressberg
- Simon Brehm as Simon
- Hjördis Petterson as Madame Rochelle
- Sif Ruud as Mrs. Brick
- Little Gerhard as himself
