= Sven-Eric Gamble =

Swedish actor (1924–1976)

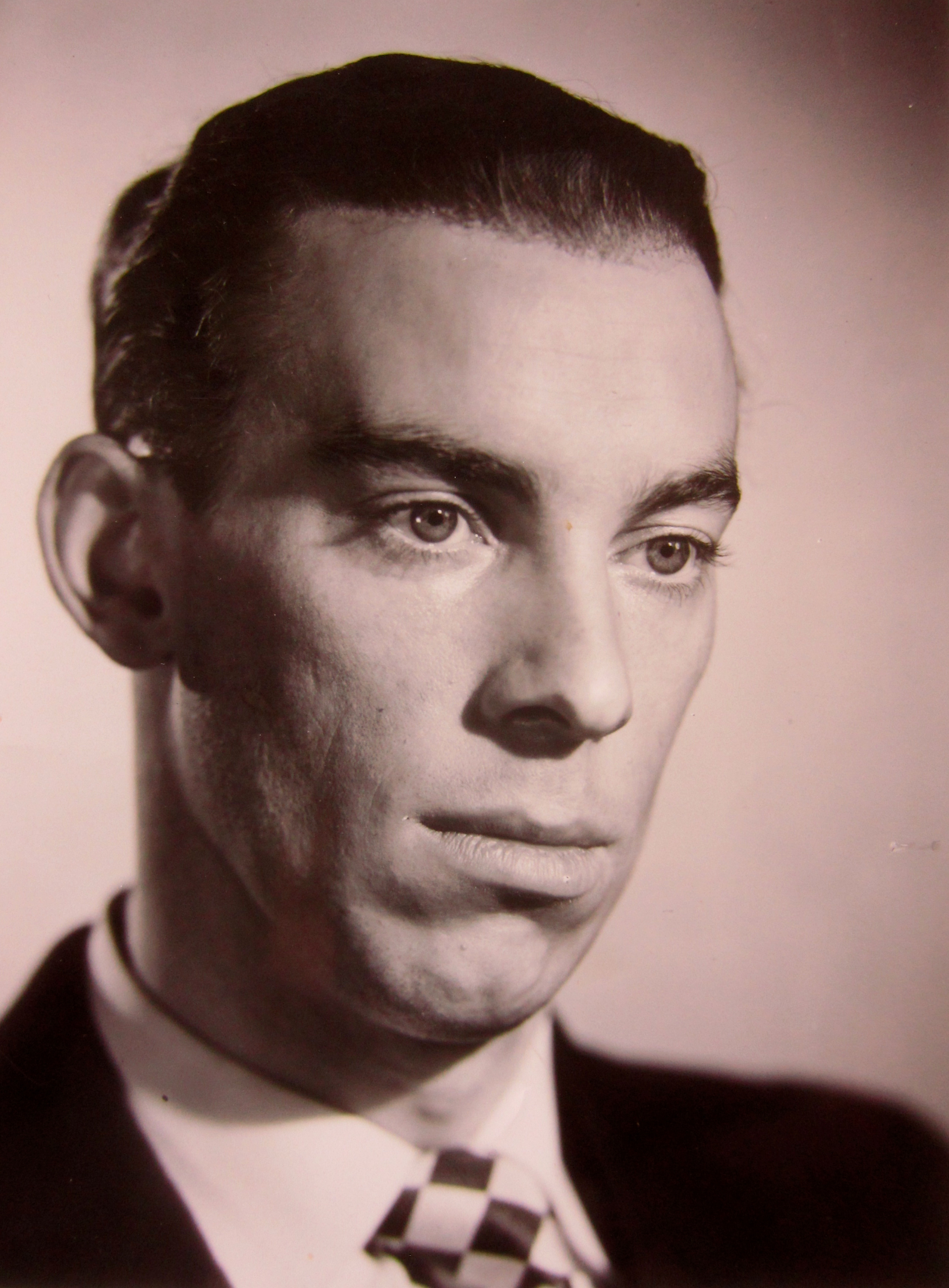
- Born: 10 August 1924; Stockholm, Sweden
- Died: 10 May 1976 (aged 51); Stockholm, Sweden
- Years active: 1934-1975

Sven-Eric Gamble (10 August 1924 – 10 May 1976) was a Swedish film actor.

== Selected filmography ==
Year	Title	Role	Notes
1934	Andersson's Kalle	Boy	
1935	Ocean Breakers	Boy who fights Stig	
1936	It Pays to Advertise	Office Boy	
1936	Adventure	Boy	
1937	The People of Bergslagen	Boy	
1937	Hotel Paradise	Pelle	
1942	Tomorrow's Melody	Boy	
1945	The Serious Game	Young Man at the Party	
1947	Soldier's Reminder	Svenne	
1948	Port of Call	Eken	
1949	Thirst	Glass worker	
1950	While the City Sleeps	Jompa	
1950	Two Stories Up	Gunnar	
1951	Skipper in Stormy Weather	Verner Kristiansson	
1953	Barabbas	Christian in slave caves at Rome	
1954	Simon the Sinner	Herbert	
1955	Violence	Norin	
1956	The Song of the Scarlet Flower	Stoker	
1956	The Hard Game	Conny Persson	
1956	Night Child	Count	
1957	Never in Your Life	Nicke	
1959	Only a Waiter	Byggnadsarbetare	
1959	Crime in Paradise	Harry Lindgren	
