= Ingrid Thulin =

Swedish actress (1926–2004)

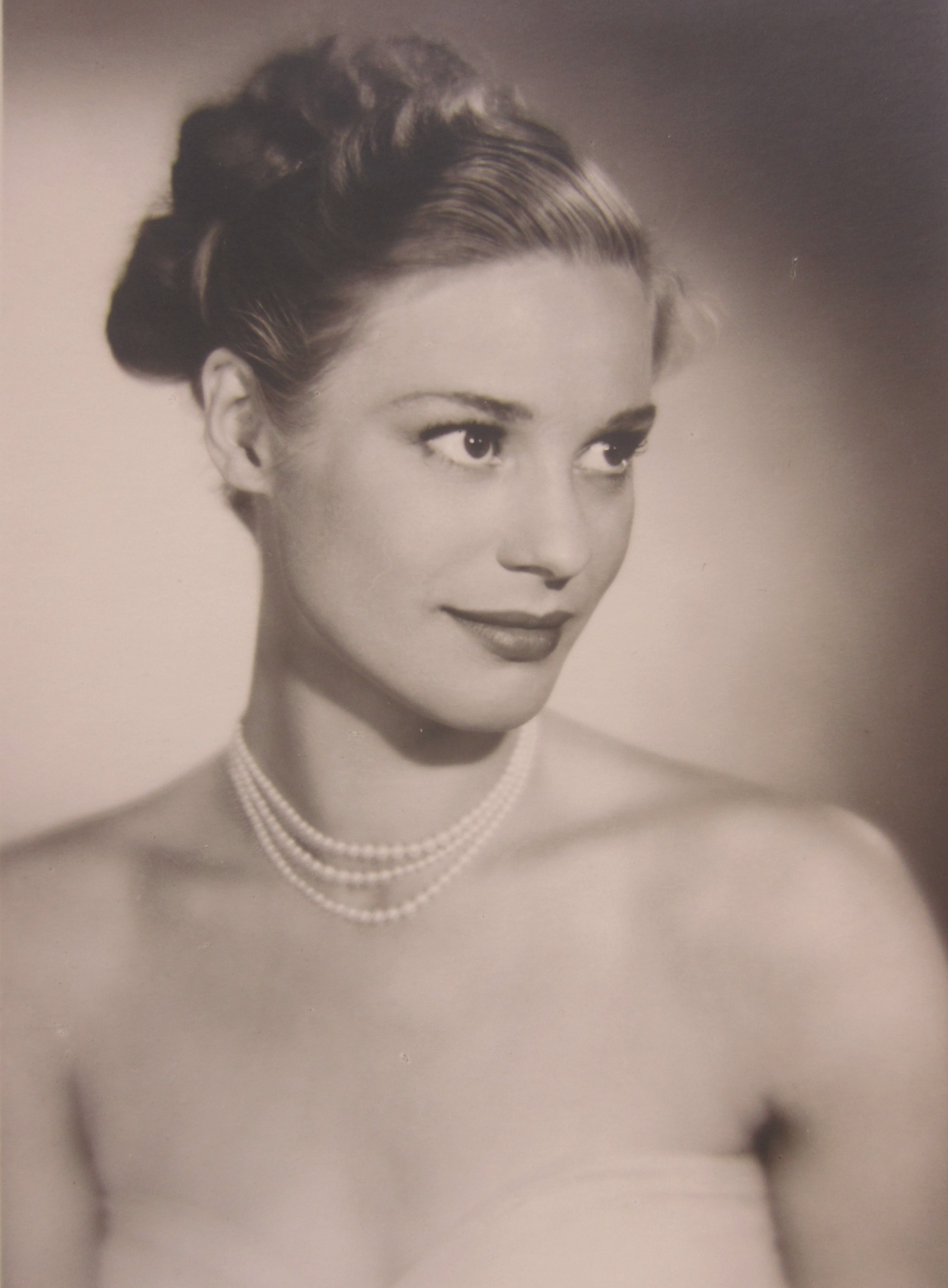
- Thulin in 1952
- Born: Ingrid Lilian Thulin; 27 January 1926; Sollefteå, Sweden
- Died: 7 January 2004 (aged 77); Stockholm, Sweden
- Education: Royal Dramatic Training Academy
- Occupations: Actress; film director
- Years active: 1948-1991
- Spouses: Claes Sylwander (m. 1952; div. 1955) Harry Schein (m. 1956; div. 1989)
- Website: www.ingridthulin.se (archived)

Ingrid Lilian Thulin (Swedish pronunciation: [ˈɪ̌ŋːrɪd tɵˈliːn]; 27 January 1926 – 7 January 2004) was a Swedish actress and director who collaborated with filmmaker Ingmar Bergman. She was often cast as harrowing and desperate characters, and earned acclaim from both Swedish and international critics. She won the Cannes Film Festival Award for Best Actress for her performance in Brink of Life (1958) and the inaugural Guldbagge Award for Best Actress in a Leading Role for The Silence (1963), and was nominated for a Best Supporting Actress BAFTA for Cries and Whispers (1972).

== Early life and education ==
Thulin was born in Sollefteå, Ångermanland, northern Sweden, the daughter of Nanna (née Larsson) and Adam Thulin, a fisherman. She took ballet lessons as a girl and was accepted by the Royal Dramatic Theatre in 1948.

== Career ==
For many years she worked regularly with Ingmar Bergman. Thulin appeared in Bergman's Wild Strawberries (1957), The Magician (1958, in which she spent much of the film dressed as a boy), Winter Light (1962), The Silence (1963), The Rite (1969) and Cries and Whispers (1972).

She shared the Best Actress award at the 1958 Cannes Film Festival and received a Guldbagge Award for Best Actress in 1964, the first year the award was given out, for her performance in The Silence.

In 1968, she was cast by Luchino Visconti in his historical epic of Nazi Germany, The Damned. Thulin's performance earned a National Society of Film Critics Award for Best Actress. In 1976, Thulin was the protagonist of another film with a similar theme, Salon Kitty, directed by Tinto Brass.

Winner of the David di Donatello Awards 1974, Thulin was also nominated for the BAFTA Award the same year. In 1980, she was the head of the jury at the 30th Berlin International Film Festival.

== Personal life ==
Her second marriage was with Harry Schein, the founder of the Swedish Film Institute, whom she was married to for more than 30 years until their divorce 1989, although they lived separately for many years before divorcing. She bought an apartment in Paris, France, in the early 1960s, and some years later a beach house in San Felice Circeo, Italy. In 1970, she became a resident of Sacrofano, Italy, where she lived for 34 years. Her memoir was published in 1992 ("Någon jag kände" ("Somebody I knew"); Norstedts Förlag; ISBN 91-1-919472-2).

== Death ==
She returned to Sweden for medical treatment and later died from cancer in Stockholm on 7 January 2004.

== Legacy ==
The municipality of Sollefteå, where Thulin is buried, has given out an Ingrid Thulin Memorial Scholarship annually since 2008. The Scholarship (which is valued at SEK 20,000), is open to any applicants pursuing the arts. It is sponsored by actress Harriet Andersson, Thulin's longtime personal friend.

== Selected filmography ==
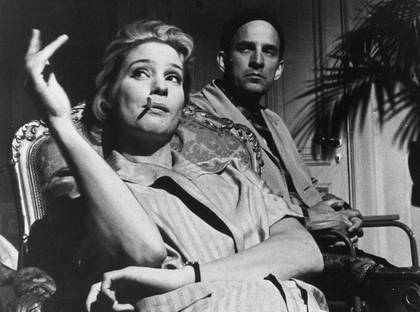
Thulin with Ingmar Bergman during the production of The Silence, 1963

Year	Title	Role	Director	Notes
1948	Jørund Smed	Girl	Åke Ohberg	
1949	Son of the Sea	Gudrun	Rolf Husberg	
1949	Love Wins Out	Margit Dahlman	Gustaf Molander	
1950	Jack of Hearts	Gunvor Ranterud	Hasse Ekman	
1950	When Love Came to the Village	Agneta	Arne Mattsson	
1951	Living on 'Hope'	Yvonne	Göran Gentele	
1952	Encounter with Life	Viola	Gösta Werner	
1952	Kalle Karlsson of Jularbo	Elsa	Ivar Johansson	
1953	A Night in the Archipelago	Ingrid	Bengt Logardt	
1953	The Chieftain of Göinge	Anna Ryding	Åke Ohberg	
1954	Dance in the Smoke	Woman in haystack	Bengt Blomgren; Yngve Gamlin	Uncredited
1954	Två sköna juveler	Lilly Fridh	Rolf Husberg	
1955	The Dance Hall	Cecilia	Börje Larsson	
1955	Whoops!	Malou Hjorthage	Stig Olin	
1956	Foreign Intrigue	Brita	Sheldon Reynolds	
1957	Never in Your Life	Lily	Arne Ragneborn	
1957	Wild Strawberries	Marianne Borg	Ingmar Bergman	
1958	Brink of Life	Cecilia Ellius	Ingmar Bergman	
1958	The Magician	Manda Vogler	Ingmar Bergman	
1960	Domaren	Brita Randel	Alf Sjöberg	
1962	Four Horsemen of the Apocalypse	Marguerite Laurier	Vincente Minnelli	
1962	Agostino	Agostino's Mother	Mauro Bolognini	
1963	Winter Light	Märta Lundberg	Ingmar Bergman	
1963	The Silence	Ester	Ingmar Bergman	
1963	Sekstet	Elaine	Annelise Hovmand	
1963	Espionage	Celeste	Stuart Rosenberg	Episode: "The Incurable One"
1964	Games of Desire	Nadine	Hans Albin; Peter Berneis	
1965	Return from the Ashes	Dr. Michele 'Mischa' Wolf	J. Lee Thompson	
1966	The War Is Over	Marianne	Alain Resnais	
1966	Night Games	Irene	Mai Zetterling	
1967	Domani non siamo più qui	Gioia	Brunello Rondi	
1968	Hour of the Wolf	Veronica Vogler	Ingmar Bergman	
1968	A Devil Under the Pillow	Camila	José María Forqué	
1968	Badarna	Cook	Yngve Gamlin	
1968	Adélaïde	Elisabeth Hermann	Jean-Daniel Simon	
1968	Somebody's Stolen Our Russian Spy	Nando Girl	José Luis Madrid	
1969	The Rite	Thea Winkelmann	Ingmar Bergman	Television film
1969	The Damned	Baroness Sophie Von Essenbeck	Luchino Visconti	
1971	Short Night of Glass Dolls	Jessica	Aldo Lado	
1971	N.P. il segreto	N.P.'s wife	Silvano Agosti	
1972	Cries and Whispers	Karin	Ingmar Bergman	
1973	La sainte famille	Maria	Pierre Koralnik	
1974	En handfull kärlek	Inez Crona	Vilgot Sjöman	
1975	Moses the Lawgiver	Miriam	Gianfranco De Bosio	Miniseries; 6 episodes
1975	Monismanien 1995	Personundersökare	Kenne Fant	
1975	La Cage	Hélène	Pierre Granier-Deferre	
1976	Salon Kitty	Kitty Kellermann	Tinto Brass	
1976	L'Agnese va a morire	Agnese	Giuliano Montaldo	
1976	The Cassandra Crossing	Dr. Elena Stradner	George Pan Cosmatos	
1978	En och en	Ylva	Sven Nykvist; Herself; Erland Josephson	Also co-director
1980	It Rained All Night the Day I Left	Unnamend Role	Nicolas Gessner	Uncredited cameo
1984	After the Rehearsal	Rakel Egerman	Ingmar Bergman	
1987	Il Giorno prima	Mrs. Havemeyer	Giuliano Montaldo	
1987	Orn	Women	Fred de Fooko	
1991	The House of Smiles	Adelina	Marco Ferreri	Last film role
