= Never in Your Life =

1957 film

- Directed by: Arne Ragneborn
- Written by: Peter Bourne; Elisabeth Burman; Lars Ekborg; Sven-Eric Gamble; Arne Ragneborn
- Produced by: Lars Burman
- Starring: Lars Ekborg; Ingrid Thulin; Sven-Eric Gamble
- Cinematography: Bengt Lindström
- Edited by: Carl-Olov Skeppstedt
- Music by: Anders Burman; Ulf Carlén; Harry Arnold
- Production companies: Nyvefilm; Iris Film; Metronome Studios AB
- Distributed by: Iris Film
- Release date: 21 December 1957
- Running time: 80 minutes
- Country: Sweden
- Language: Swedish

Never in Your Life (Swedish: Aldrig i livet) is a 1957 Swedish crime film directed by Arne Ragneborn and starring Lars Ekborg, Ingrid Thulin and Sven-Eric Gamble. It was shot at the in Stocksund Studios in Stockholm. The film was originally made under the title It Happens Tonight (Det händer i natt) but faced major censorship issues, and was eventually released with cuts and a new title. The new version turned the events into a dream, and introduced greater comic elements.

== Synopsis ==
A young criminal plays a major heist and in order to secure information he becomes engaged to the daughter of the nightwatchman. Having carried off the robbery, he proceeds to murder two of his criminal associates and plans to escape to South America.

== Cast ==
- Lars Ekborg as Svampen
- Sven-Eric Gamble as Nicke
- Arne Ragneborn as Gunnar
- Ingrid Thulin as Lily
- Hjördis Petterson as Caretaker
- Margareta Nordin as Margit Karlsson
- Hampe Faustman as Klämman
- Peter Lindgren as Ärtan
- Keve Hjelm as Rabatten
- Elof Ahrle as Manne Karlsson
- Stig Järrel as Fencer
- Astrid Bodin as Mrs. Karlsson
- Lars Burman as Film Photographer
- Ulf Carlén as Bartender
- Åke Engfeldt as Accountant
- John Melin as Man Who Can't Sleep

== Bibliography ==
- Qvist, Per Olov & von Bagh, Peter. Guide to the Cinema of Sweden and Finland. Greenwood Publishing Group, 2000.
- Tapper, Michael. Swedish Cops: From Sjöwall and Wahlöö to Stieg Larsson. Intellect Books, 2014.
