= Monica Nielsen (actress) =

Swedish actress (1937–2025)

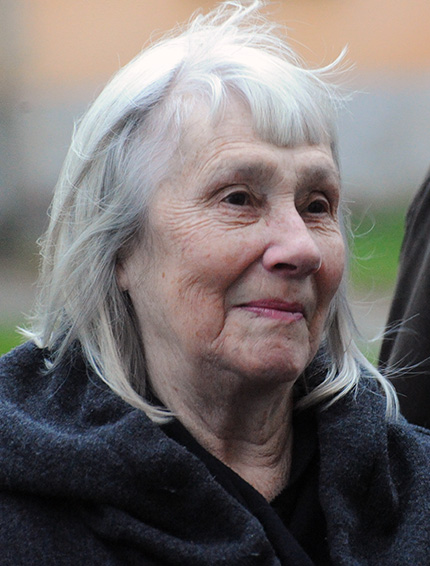
- Nielsen in 2014
- Born: Monica Lindgren; 30 November 1937; Stockholm, Sweden
- Died: 1 June 2025 (aged 87); Stockholm, Sweden
- Occupations: Actress, singer
- Years active: 1945–2010
- Children: 2, including Petra Nielsen
- Relatives: Peter Lindgren (father); Gunnar Nielsen (stepfather); Merit Hertzman-Ericson (aunt); Lars-Magnus Lindgren (uncle)

Monica Nielsen (née Lindgren; 30 November 1937 – 1 June 2025) was a Swedish actress and singer.

== Life and career ==
Nielsen made her debut aged 8, at Helsingborg City Theatre and then began working as a child actress.

She appeared in more than 50 films and television shows from 1947 onwards, in a career which spanned over 60 years.

Nielsen was the daughter of actors Peter Lindgren and Marianne Nielsen. Her surname changed when her stepfather Gunnar Nielsen adopted her. Additionally, she was the niece of director Lars-Magnus Lindgren and the niece of psychologist Merit Hertzman-Ericson.

She resided with Adam Inczèdy-Gombos (1940–2020) for several decades before marrying antique dealer Torsten Björklund (1923–2013) in 1987. With Inczèdy-Gombos, she had two children, one of whom is the actress Petra Nielsen.

Nielsen died aged 87, in Stockholm on 1 June 2025, following a period of ill health.

== Selected filmography ==
- Blue Sky (1955)
- The Girl in the Rain (1955)
- The Dance Hall (1955)
- The Song of the Scarlet Flower (1956)
- A Guest in His Own House (1957)
- Pirates on the Malonen (1959)
- The Cats (1965)
- The Princess (1966)
- The Man on the Balcony (1993)
