= Jean-Pierre Bernard =

French actor (1933–2017)

- Born: 22 January 1933; Paris
- Died: 7 July 2017 (aged 84)
- Occupation: Actor

Jean-Pierre Bernard (22 January 1933 – 7 July 2017) was a French film, television and stage actor. He appeared in many French films over a 50-year period and became known internationally for his portrayal of a French climber named Jean-Paul Montaigne in the 1975 film The Eiger Sanction that was directed by and starred Clint Eastwood.

Bernard studied at the French National Academy of Dramatic Arts. His French language film appearances include: Adelaide (1968) directed by Jean-Daniel Simon, Le Soulier de satin (1985) directed by Manoel de Oliveira and Mon ami le traître (1988) directed by José Giovanni .

== Filmography ==
=== Film ===
Jean-Pierre Bernard film credits
Year	Title	Role	Notes
1964	Requiem pour un caïd	Pinelli	
1968	Adélaïde	Christian	
1969	The Adding Machine	Christian	
1971	Raphael, or The Debauched One	Norville	
1975	The Eiger Sanction	Montaigne	
1980	Voulez-vous un bébé Nobel ?	Le financier arabe	
1981	Votre enfant m'intéresse		
1981	Une affaire d'hommes	Jean	
1982	Les Misérables	Avocat	
1985	Brigade des moeurs	Le Grec	
1985	The Satin Slipper	Don Camille	
1986	On a volé Charlie Spencer	L'amant de la mère	
1988	Mon ami le traître	Le capitaine / The captain	
2002	Monique	Le vieux photographe	
2008	A Man and His Dog	Un clochard	

=== Television ===
Jean-Pierre Bernard television credits
Year	Title	Role	Notes	Ref.
1984	Julien Fontanes, magistrat	Dany Mandina	1 episode	
1992	Counterstrike	Carlo Rosti	Episode: "The Sting"	
