= Paradise (1955 film) =

1955 film

- Directed by: Arne Ragneborn
- Written by: Johannes Allen; Arne Ragneborn
- Produced by: Lars Burman
- Starring: Edvin Adolphson; Gunnel Broström; Eva Dahlbeck
- Cinematography: Jan Lindeström
- Edited by: Carl-Olov Skeppstedt
- Music by: Sven Sköld; Gösta Theselius
- Production company: Metronome Studios AB
- Distributed by: Freja-Film AB
- Release date: 17 October 1955
- Running time: 93 minutes
- Country: Sweden
- Language: Swedish

Paradise (Swedish: Paradiset) is a 1955 Swedish drama film directed by Arne Ragneborn and starring Edvin Adolphson, Gunnel Broström and Eva Dahlbeck. It was shot at the Stocksund Studios in Stockholm. The film's sets were designed by the art director Carl Gyllenberg.

== Synopsis ==
Two men lose their jobs due to their heavy drinking. While one is able to overcome alcoholism and get a steady job, the other struggles.

== Cast ==
- Edvin Adolphson as Rudolf Ekström
- Gunnel Broström as Rita Ekström
- Naima Wifstrand as Mrs. Ekström
- Åke Grönberg as Betil Karlsson
- Eva Dahlbeck as Ulla Karlsson
- Doris Svedlund as Barbro
- Arne Ragneborn as Lillebror
- Åke Claesson as Doctor Martin
- Hugo Björne as Erik Svenning
- Harry Ahlin as Ville
- Elof Ahrle as Bertil's colleague
- Gösta Bernhard as Arne
- Eivor Engelbrektsson as Lily
- Stig Järrel as Lars
- Gösta Prüzelius as member of sobriety organization
- Sif Ruud as Nora
- Georg Skarstedt as Egon
- Carl Ström as Mats
- Lars Burman as drunk
- Sven-Axel Carlsson as skier who finds Rudolf
- Linnéa Hillberg as wife of sobriety organization member

== Bibliography ==
- Qvist, Per Olov & von Bagh, Peter. Guide to the Cinema of Sweden and Finland. Greenwood Publishing Group, 2000.
