= The Vicious Breed =

1954 film

- West German poster
- Directed by: Arne Ragneborn
- Written by: Arne Ragneborn
- Produced by: Lars Burman
- Starring: Arne Ragneborn; Carl-Olof Alm; Sif Ruud; Inga Gill
- Cinematography: Sven Thermænius; Åke Westerlund
- Edited by: Carl-Olov Skeppstedt
- Music by: Charlie Norman; Gunnar Lundén-Welden
- Production company: Metronome Studios AB
- Distributed by: Sveafilm
- Release date: 26 December 1954
- Running time: 73 minutes
- Country: Sweden
- Language: Swedish

The Vicious Breed (Swedish: Farlig frihet) is a 1954 Swedish crime drama film directed by Arne Ragneborn and featuring Ragneborn, Carl-Olof Alm, Sif Ruud and Inga Gill. It was shot at the Stocksund Studios in Stockholm.

== Synopsis ==
A juvenile delinquent escapes from a detention centre and goes on a spree, committing a new series of crimes before he is eventually tracked down and cornered by the police.

== Cast ==
- Arne Ragneborn as 'Myggan' Strömholm
- Maj-Britt Lindholm as Laila
- Carl-Olof Alm as 'Bellman'
- Fritiof Billquist as Homosexual
- Sif Ruud as The Evil Lady
- Jan-Olof Rydqvist as Tjoffe
- Inga Gill as Mammie
- Lars Ekborg as Knutte
- Peter Lindgren as Inmate
- Lars Burman as Inmate
- Åke Grönberg as House Owner
- Sven-Axel Carlsson as Inmate
- Bengt Martin as Tommy, Homosexual
- Georg Skarstedt as Man Walking at the Beach
- Catrin Westerlund as Ulla, Bellman's Friend

== Bibliography ==
- Qvist, Per Olov & von Bagh, Peter. Guide to the Cinema of Sweden and Finland. Greenwood Publishing Group, 2000.
