= The Street (1949 film) =

1949 film

- Directed by: Gösta Werner
- Written by: Mårten Edlund
- Based on: Birger Jarlsgatan by Nils Idström
- Produced by: Inge Ivarson
- Starring: Maj-Britt Nilsson; Peter Lindgren; Keve Hjelm
- Cinematography: Sten Dahlgren
- Edited by: Ragnar Engström
- Music by: Willy Mattes
- Production company: Kungsfilm
- Distributed by: Kungsfilm
- Release date: 28 February 1949
- Running time: 87 minutes
- Country: Sweden
- Language: Swedish

The Street (Swedish: Gatan) is a 1949 Swedish drama film directed by Gösta Werner and starring Maj-Britt Nilsson, Peter Lindgren and Keve Hjelm. It was shot at the Centrumateljéerna Studios in Stockholm and on location in the city. The film's sets were designed by the art director P.A. Lundgren.

== Synopsis ==
A young woman is knocked down in a Stockholm street by a vehicle and is taken to hospital. While under anaesthetic she hallucinates about the events that have led up to the accident.

== Cast ==
- Maj-Britt Nilsson as Britt Malm
- Peter Lindgren as Bertil 'Berra' Wiring
- Keve Hjelm as Rudolf 'Rulle' Malm
- Naemi Briese as Vera 'Gullan' Karlsson
- Stig Järrel as Staff Manager Sven Andreasson
- Åke Fridell as Gustaf Persson
- Marianne Löfgren as Elin Persson
- Per Oscarsson as Åke Rodelius
- Göran Gentele as Göte
- Mimi Pollak as Mrs. Rodelius
- Ragnar Arvedson as Consul Rodelius
- Arne Källerud as Harry
- Julia Cæsar as Mrs. Blomqvist
- Wiktor Andersson as Skipper
- Svea Holst as Anna Andreasson
- Björn Berglund as Dr. Linell
- Sif Ruud as Mrs. Bergman
- Börje Mellvig as Chief Constable
- Julie Bernby as Cashier
- Brita Borg as Singer
- Bernt Callenbo as Errand Boy
- Mary Rapp as Prostitute
- Fylgia Zadig as Prostitute
- Torsten Lilliecrona as Undercover Police Officer
- Rune Stylander as Undercover Police Officer
- Barbro Flodquist as Vera's Neighbour
- Tom Walter as Rulle's Neighbour
- Vera Lindby as Woman at Hotel
- John Zacharias as Rulle's Colleague
- Nils Hallberg as Man Outside Hot Dog Stand
- Anna-Greta Krigström as Girl in Boat
- Öllegård Wellton as Young Woman at Train Station
- Lissi Alandh as Woman at Restaurant
- Emmy Albiin as Woman Selling Flowers

== Bibliography ==
- Qvist, Per Olov & von Bagh, Peter. Guide to the Cinema of Sweden and Finland. Greenwood Publishing Group, 2000.
