= The Beloved Game =

1959 film

- Directed by: Kenne Fant
- Written by: Lars Helgesson
- Produced by: Gunnar Lundin
- Starring: Bibi Andersson; Sven Lindberg; Lars Ekborg
- Cinematography: Max Wilén
- Edited by: Carl-Olov Skeppstedt
- Music by: Lennart Fors
- Production company: Nordisk Tonefilm
- Distributed by: Nordisk Tonefilm
- Release date: 30 September 1959
- Running time: 91 minutes
- Country: Sweden
- Language: Swedish

The Beloved Game (Swedish: Den kara leken) is a 1959 Swedish comedy film directed by Kenne Fant and starring Bibi Andersson, Sven Lindberg and Lars Ekborg. The film's sets were designed by the art director Bibi Lindström.

== Cast ==
- Bibi Andersson as Lena
- Sven Lindberg as Sven
- Lars Ekborg as Pelle
- Sigge Fürst as Adolf Grusande
- Sif Ruud as Telephone operator

== Bibliography ==
- Qvist, Per Olov & von Bagh, Peter. Guide to the Cinema of Sweden and Finland. Greenwood Publishing Group, 2000.
