= Stimulantia =

- Theatrical release poster
- Directed by: Hans Abramson; Hans Alfredson; Arne Arnbom; Tage Danielsson; Lars Görling; Ingmar Bergman; Jörn Donner; Gustaf Molander; Vilgot Sjöman
- Screenplay by: Hans Abramson; Hans Alfredson; Arne Arnbom; Ingmar Bergman; Tage Danielsson; Jörn Donner; Lars Görling; Erland Josephson; Gustaf Molander; Vilgot Sjöman
- Story by: Honoré de Balzac; Guy de Maupassant
- Produced by: Olle Nordemar
- Cinematography: Ingmar Bergman; Rune Ericson; Lars Johnsson; Björn Thermænius
- Edited by: Bengt Karingi; Per Krafft; Ulla Rygh; Carl-Olov Skeppstedt
- Music by: Bo Nilsson; Georg Riedel
- Distributed by: AB Svensk Filmindustri
- Release date: 28 March 1967
- Running time: 105 minutes
- Country: Sweden
- Language: Swedish

Stimulantia is a 1967 Swedish anthology film written and directed by Hans Abramson, Hans Alfredson, Arne Arnbom, Tage Danielsson, Lars Görling, Ingmar Bergman, Jörn Donner, Gustaf Molander, and Vilgot Sjöman.

== Cast ==
- Hans Abramson as Interviewer and narrator
- Hans Alfredson as Jacob Landelius
- Harriet Andersson as Woman in hotel room
- Daniel Bergman as himself
- Ingrid Bergman as Matilda Hartman
- Gunnar Björnstrand as Paul Hartman
- Gunnel Broström as Jeanette Ribbing
- Lars Ekborg as Mr. Svensk
- Glenna Forster-Jones as Naked girl
- Lena Granhagen as Sofi Lundblad
- Inga Landgré as Margareta Svensk
- Käbi Laretei as herself
- Birgit Nilsson as herself
