= Sängkammartjuven =

1959 film

- Directed by: Göran Gentele
- Written by: Göran Gentele
- Starring: Jarl Kulle
- Cinematography: Karl-Erik Alberts
- Edited by: Wic Kjellin
- Release date: 26 December 1959
- Running time: 93 minutes
- Country: Sweden
- Language: Swedish

Sängkammartjuven is a 1959 Swedish comedy film directed by Göran Gentele. It was entered into the 10th Berlin International Film Festival.

== Cast ==
- Jarl Kulle - Johan Jacob Wenkel
- Gaby Stenberg - Madeleine Messing
- Lena Söderblom - Lola Hallberg
- Holger Löwenadler - Kurt Månstedt
- Lars Ekborg - Anders Månstedt
- Douglas Håge - Eriksson
- Björn Gustafson - Robert / Don Roberto
- Hjördis Petterson - Guest at party
- Rune Halvarsson - Carlsson
- Birgitta Andersson - Journalist
- Inga Gill - Barwaitress
