= Encounter with Life =

1952 film directed by Gösta Werner

- Directed by: Gösta Werner
- Written by: Ivar Ahlstedt
- Starring: Doris Svedlund; Per Oscarsson; Arnold Sjöstrand
- Cinematography: Martin Bodin
- Edited by: Oscar Rosander
- Music by: Carl-Olof Anderberg
- Production company: Fribergs Filmbyrå
- Distributed by: Fribergs Filmbyrå
- Release date: 1 February 1952
- Running time: 75 minutes
- Country: Sweden
- Language: Swedish

Encounter with Life (Swedish: Möte med livet) is a 1952 Swedish drama film directed by Gösta Werner and starring Doris Svedlund, Per Oscarsson and Arnold Sjöstrand. It was shot at the Råsunda Studios in Stockholm and location shooting in Nyköping. The film's sets were designed by the art director Nils Svenwall.

== Synopsis ==
Gun and Robert are in love with each other, but while he is away doing military service they both have relationships with others. She falls pregnant and then miscarries, while he contracts syphilis. In spite of this they work to forge a successful marriage when he returns.

== Cast ==
- Doris Svedlund as Gun
- Per Oscarsson as Robert
- Arnold Sjöstrand as Dr. Almer
- Britta Billsten as Karin
- Märta Dorff as Östermalm lady who performs abortions
- Sif Ruud as Mrs. Jakobsson
- Lars Ekborg as Klas
- Arne Ragneborn as Göran
- Ingrid Thulin as Viola
- Peter Lindgren as Gun's Friend
- Kjerstin Dellert as Singer
- Björn Berglund as Clerk
- Bengt Blomgren as Sven
- Margit Carlqvist as Klas' Girlfriend
- Yvonne Lombard as Woman-friend
- Kurt-Olof Sundström as Kurt

== Bibliography ==
- Qvist, Per Olov & von Bagh, Peter. Guide to the Cinema of Sweden and Finland. Greenwood Publishing Group, 2000.
