= Lena Söderblom =

Swedish actress

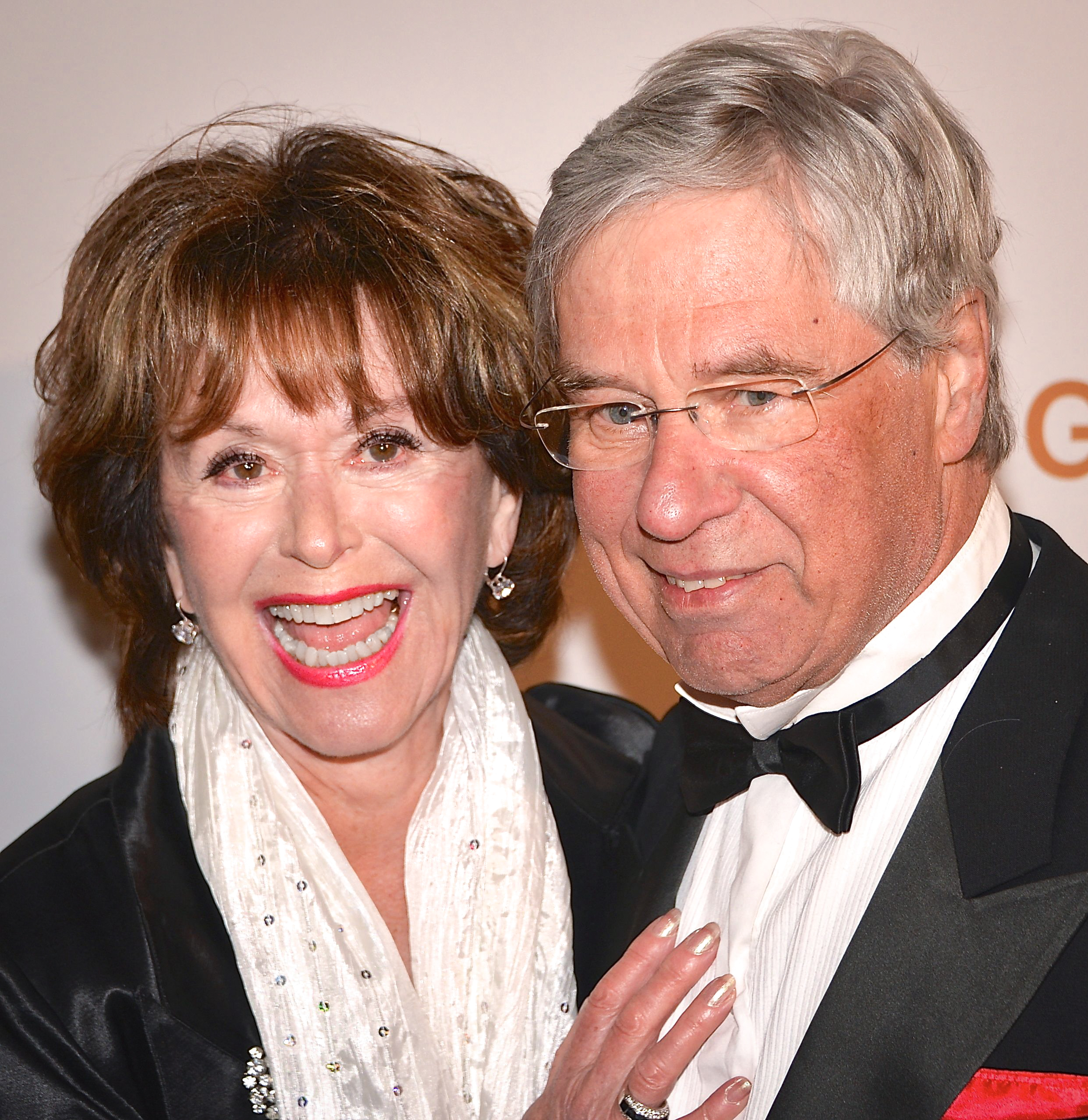
- Söderblom with Leif Zetterling
- Born: 24 October 1935 (age 90); Stockholm, Sweden
- Occupation: Actress
- Years active: 1955–present

Lena Söderblom (born 24 October 1935) is a Swedish actress. She has appeared in 24 films since 1955.

== Selected filmography ==
- The Girl in the Rain (1955)
- Miss April (1958)
- Sängkammartjuven (1959)
- Jönssonligan och Dynamit-Harry (1982)
- Sista dansen (1993)
