= Hide and Seek (1963 film) =

1963 film

- Directed by: Lars-Magnus Lindgren
- Written by: Lars-Erik Liedholm; Lars-Magnus Lindgren
- Produced by: Karl-Eric Svensson
- Starring: Jan Malmsjö; Catrin Westerlund; Sven Lindberg
- Cinematography: Rune Ericson
- Edited by: Lennart Wallén
- Music by: Ulf Björlin
- Production company: Sandrews
- Distributed by: Sandrews
- Release date: 6 February 1963
- Running time: 105 minutes
- Country: Sweden
- Language: Swedish

Hide and Seek (Swedish: Kurragömma) is a 1963 Swedish comedy film directed by Lars-Magnus Lindgren and starring Jan Malmsjö, Catrin Westerlund and Sven Lindberg. It was shot at the Råsunda Studios in Stockholm with location footage taken in Genoa and Paris. The film's sets were designed by the art director Jan Boleslaw.

== Cast ==
- Jan Malmsjö as Peter Flink
- Catrin Westerlund as Lenas Holmes
- Sven Lindberg as Jens Polster-Jensen
- Sif Ruud as Lucie
- Ulf Palme as Roger
- Gunnar Sjöberg as Felici
- Margit Carlqvist as Betty
- Keve Hjelm as Sosostro
- Elsa Prawitz as Ninon
- Toivo Pawlo as Georges
- Ingvar Kjellson as Prison Governor
- Tor Isedal as Serini
- Björn Gustafson as La bête
- Sten Lonnert as Alfons
- Åke Harnesk as French Gendarm
- Axel Düberg as Mouche
- Liane Linden as Roger's secretary
- Christer Abrahamsen as Bell boy
- Carl-Axel Elfving as Cutter
- Peter Lindgren as Intellektuelle Johansson
- Birger Sahlberg as Conference member
- Hanny Schedin as Irate hotel guest
- Georg Skarstedt as Goldsmith

== Bibliography ==
- Qvist, Per Olov & von Bagh, Peter. Guide to the Cinema of Sweden and Finland. Greenwood Publishing Group, 2000.
