= The Gallows Man =

1945 film

- Directed by: Gustaf Molander
- Written by: Runar Schildt (play); Gustaf Molander; Karl Ragnar Gierow
- Starring: Edvin Adolphson; Wanda Rothgardt; Inga Tidblad
- Cinematography: Åke Dahlqvist
- Edited by: Oscar Rosander
- Music by: Lars-Erik Larsson
- Production company: Svensk Filmindustri
- Distributed by: Svensk Filmindustri
- Release date: 8 October 1945
- Running time: 99 minutes
- Country: Sweden
- Language: Swedish

The Gallows Man (Swedish: Galgmannen) is a 1945 Swedish historical drama film directed by Gustaf Molander and starring Edvin Adolphson, Wanda Rothgardt and Inga Tidblad. The film's sets were designed by the art director Arne Åkermark.

== Main cast ==
- Edvin Adolphson as Col. Christoffer Toll
- Wanda Rothgardt as Maria
- Inga Tidblad as Elizavetha
- Hilda Borgström as Gamla Kristin
- Gunnel Broström as Natasja
- Hugo Björne as Russian General
- Olof Molander as The Rabbi
- Sigge Fürst as Strong Man

== Bibliography ==
- Qvist, Per Olov & von Bagh, Peter. Guide to the Cinema of Sweden and Finland. Greenwood Publishing Group, 2000.
