= Anita: Swedish Nymphet =

1973 film by Torgny Wickman

- Theatrical release poster
- Swedish: Anita – ur en tonårsflickas dagbok
- Directed by: Torgny Wickman
- Written by: Torgny Wickman
- Produced by: Inge Ivarson; Ove Wallius
- Starring: Christina Lindberg; Stellan Skarsgård; Per Mattsson; Ewert Granholm; Arne Ragneborn
- Cinematography: Hans Dittmer
- Edited by: Lasse Lundberg
- Music by: Lennart Fors; Torgny Wickman
- Production companies: Swedish Film Production; Alpha France
- Distributed by: Pallas Film (Sweden)
- Release dates: 25 December 1973 (Sweden); 27 March 1974 (France)
- Running time: 95 minutes
- Countries: Sweden; France
- Language: Swedish

Anita: Swedish Nymphet (Swedish: Anita – ur en tonårsflickas dagbok, lit. 'From the Diary of a Teenage Girl'; French: Les Impures) is a 1973 erotic drama film written and directed by Torgny Wickman, starring Christina Lindberg, Stellan Skarsgård, Per Mattsson, Ewert Granholm and Arne Ragneborn.

== Plot ==
This erotic tale centers on the alluring Anita, whose search for love leads to an empty life of nymphomania. Anita's self-destructive path takes a new turn when she meets college student Erik, who tries to help her overcome her addiction. Erik plays the role of counselor as Anita slowly reveals her troubled past, but will his prescription of ultimate ecstasy really cure her?

== Cast ==
- Christina Lindberg as Anita
- Stellan Skarsgård as Erik
- Danièle Vlaminck as Anita's mother
- Michel David as Anita's father
- Per Mattsson as artist
- Ewert Granholm as the glasser
- Arne Ragneborn as man at library
- Jörgen Barwe as Lundbaeck
- Ericka Wickman as Anita's twin sister (daughter of director Torgny Wickman)
- Berit Agedahl as Lesbian social worker
- Jan-Olof Rydqvist as school teacher
- Thore Segelström as school teacher
- Lasse Lundberg as man at railway station

== Production ==
The film was made in Stockholm, Katrineholm and the church in Vadsbro with its two towers.

== Reception ==
A retrospective review from Scoopy.com declared: "Because of its serious treatment of nymphomania as a disease, Anita is not at all erotic".

== Distribution ==
Because of its explicit nature, the film was banned in Norway and New Zealand.

== See also ==
- Lolita
- Nymphomaniac
