= A Doll's House (1956 film) =

1956 film directed by Anders Henrikson

- Directed by: Anders Henrikson
- Written by: Kathrine Aurell; Tage Aurell
- Based on: A Doll's House by August Strindberg
- Produced by: Olle Brunaeus
- Starring: Mai Zetterling; Gunnel Broström; George Fant
- Cinematography: Karl-Erik Alberts
- Edited by: Wic Kjellin
- Music by: Harry Arnold
- Production company: Europa Film
- Distributed by: Europa Film
- Release date: 20 February 1956
- Running time: 78 minutes
- Country: Sweden
- Language: Swedish

A Doll's House (Swedish: Ett dockhem) is a 1956 Swedish drama film directed by Anders Henrikson and starring Mai Zetterling, Gunnel Broström and George Fant. It was shot at the Sundbyberg Studios of Europa Film in Stockholm. The film's sets were designed by the art director Arne Åkermark. It is based on the 1886 short story of the same title by August Strindberg, which he had written is response to Henrik Ibsen's 1879 play A Doll's House. It was released in the United States in a double bill with Getting Married under the alternative title Of Love and Lust.

== Cast ==
- Mai Zetterling as Gurli Pall
- Gunnel Broström as Ottilia Sandegren
- George Fant as Wilhelm Pall
- Hjördis Petterson as Gurli's mother
- Torsten Lilliecrona as Physician
- Einar Axelsson as War commissioner
- Artilio Bergholtz as Jonathan Pall
- Mats Björne as Officer
- Svea Holm as Lovisa
- Axel Högel as Bosun
- Gittan Larsson as Maid
- Marianne Lindberg as Maid
- Charlotte Lindell as Lillan Pall
- Carin Lundquist as Maid
- Wilma Malmlöf as Boarding house manager
- Hans Strååt as Second mate
- Hans Sundberg as Oarsman
- Åke Svensson as Mailman

== Bibliography ==
- Qvist, Per Olav; Bagh, Peter von (2000-03-30). Guide to the Cinema of Sweden and Finland. Bloomsbury Academic. ISBN 978-0-313-30377-7.
