= The Dance Hall =

1955 film

- Directed by: Börje Larsson
- Written by: Börje Larsson
- Produced by: Lennart Landheim
- Starring: Elof Ahrle; Sonja Wigert; Lars Ekborg
- Cinematography: Kalle Bergholm
- Edited by: Lennart Arvidsson
- Music by: Gunnar Lundén-Welden; Charlie Norman
- Production company: Nordisk Tonefilm
- Distributed by: Nordisk Tonefilm
- Release date: 30 July 1955
- Running time: 100 minutes
- Country: Sweden
- Language: Swedish

The Dance Hall (Swedish: Danssalongen) is a 1955 Swedish musical drama film written and directed by Börje Larsson and starring Elof Ahrle, Sonja Wigert and Lars Ekborg. It was shot at the Kungsholmen Studios of Nordisk Tonefilm in Stockholm. The film's sets were designed by the art director Bibi Lindström.

== Cast ==
- Elof Ahrle as Viktor
- Sonja Wigert as Ria
- Lars Ekborg as 'Doggen' Andersson
- Gunvor Pontén as Sonja Gren
- Lennart Lindberg as Bill
- Ingrid Thulin as Cecilia
- Naima Wifstrand as 'Madame'
- Sten Gester as Bengt
- Märta Dorff as Ofelia
- Mats Bahr as Oskar
- Lasse Sarri as Georg
- Birgitta Olzon as Minna
- Hans Bergström as Göran
- Bengt Blomgren as Josef Ek
- Sonja Westerbergh as Marianne Stern
- Gösta Prüzelius as Rolf Svensson
- Catrin Westerlund as Majsan
- Olof Sandborg as Doctor
- Hanny Schedin as Maid
- Georg Skarstedt as Sonja's Neighbor
- Kristina Adolphson as Greta
- Gunnar Svensson as Musician
- Bengt-Arne Wallin as Musician
- Egil Johansen as Musician
- Gösta Krantz as Manager
- Jessie Flaws as Girl Dancing with Göran
- Monica Nielsen as Girl at the Nightclub

== Bibliography ==
- Iverson, Gunnar, Soderbergh Widding, Astrid & Soila, Tytti. Nordic National Cinemas. Routledge, 2005.
