= Eva (1948 film) =

1948 film by Gustaf Molander

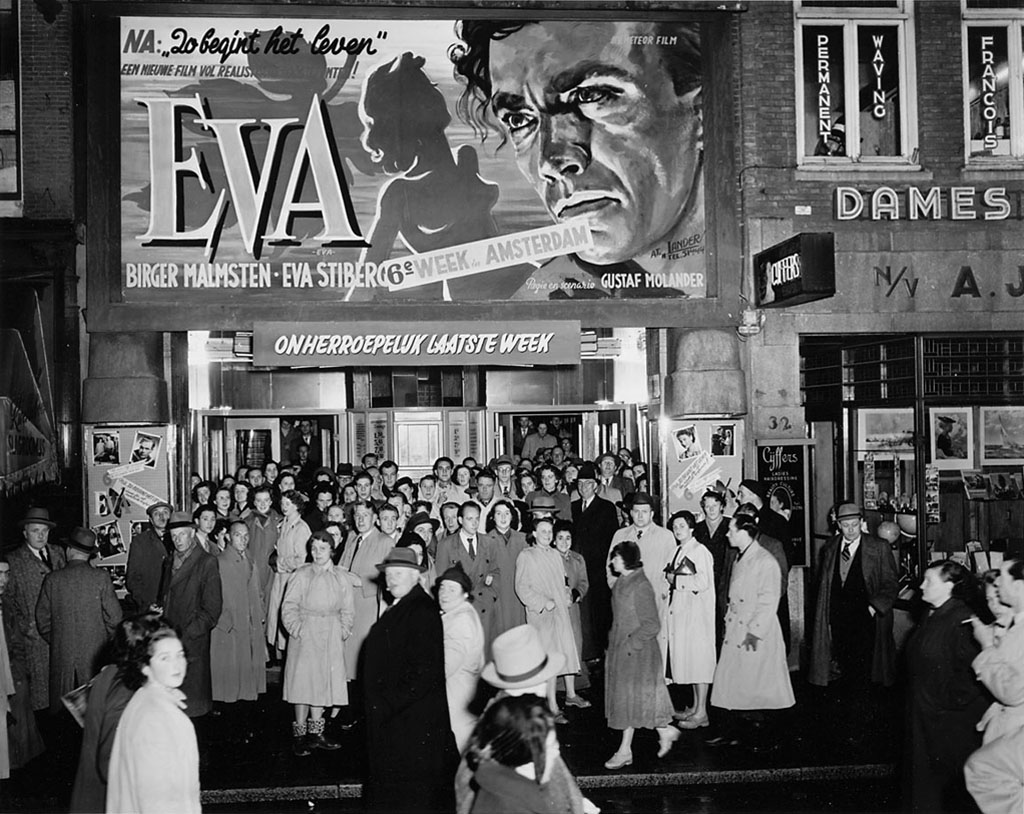
- Eva being shown in Amsterdam in 1951
- Directed by: Gustaf Molander
- Screenplay by: Ingmar Bergman; Gustaf Molander
- Based on: "Trumpetaren och vår herre" by Ingmar Bergman
- Produced by: Harald Molander
- Starring: Birger Malmsten; Eva Stiberg; Eva Dahlbeck
- Cinematography: Åke Dahlqvist
- Edited by: Oscar Rosander
- Distributed by: AB Svensk Filmindustri
- Release date: 26 December 1948
- Running time: 98 minutes
- Country: Sweden
- Language: Swedish

Eva is a 1948 Swedish drama film directed by Gustaf Molander and written by Ingmar Bergman, based on Bergman's short story "Trumpetaren och vår herre".

== Plot ==
As Bo (Birger Malmsten) returns home from military service, he flashes back to an episode in his childhood where he ran away from home and fell in with a band of performers. One of the performers has a daughter, a blind girl, and seeking to impress her Bo steals a locomotive. The train crashes and the girl is killed. This is first of many intrusions of death into Bo's life.

We also see him dealing with his dying uncle and the body of a German soldier that has washed ashore. This is contrasted with life, as represented by his young lover Eva (Eva Stilberg) and eventually their son. In a Hitchcockian digression, Bo hallucinates killing his friend Göran (Stig Olin) to be with his alluring wife (Eva Dahlbeck).

Bo and Eva escape to a remote island whose only other occupant is a widowed farmer. Eva goes into labor early and Bo and the farmer must fight the current to row her to a hospital. In a montage superimposed over Bo's rowing, we see images from throughout the film, seeming to suggest a struggle between life and death that is going on his mind. Upon his son's birth, Bo feels a resolution to his search for meaning in a cruel world.

== Cast ==
- Birger Malmsten as Bo
- Eva Stiberg as Eva
- Eva Dahlbeck as Susanne
- Åke Claesson as Fredriksson
- Wanda Rothgardt as Mrs. Fredriksson
- Hilda Borgström as Maria
- Stig Olin as Göran
- Inga Landgré as Frida
- Olof Sandborg as Berglund
- Carl Ström as Johansson
- Sture Ericson as Josef Friedel
