= Rudolf Bing =

Austrian-American opera impresario (1902–1997)

Sir Rudolf Bing

General Manager of the Metropolitan Opera
- In office 1950–1972
- Preceded by: Edward Patrick Johnson
- Succeeded by: Göran Gentele

Personal details
- Born: Rudolf Franz Joseph Bing; January 9, 1902 Vienna, Austro-Hungarian Empire (now Austria)
- Died: September 2, 1997 (aged 95) Yonkers, New York, U.S.
- Spouses: Nina Schelemskaya-Schlesnaya (m. 1928; died 1983) Carroll Douglass (m. 1987; ann. 1989)
- Education: University of Vienna
- Occupation: Opera impresario

Sir Rudolf Bing, KBE (January 9, 1902 – September 2, 1997) was an Austrian-born British opera impresario who worked in Germany, the United Kingdom and the United States, including as General Manager of the Metropolitan Opera in New York City from 1950 to 1972. He was naturalized as a British subject in 1946 and was knighted in 1971, although he spent decades living in the United States, where he died.

== Life and career ==
=== Early years ===
Born Rudolf Franz Joseph Bing in Vienna, Austria-Hungary to a well-to-do Jewish family (his father was an industrialist). Bing was an apprentice to a bookseller at the prestigious Viennese shop of Gilhofer & Ranschburg before moving on to Hugo Heller, who also ran a theatrical and concert agency. He then studied music and art history at the University of Vienna. In 1927, he went to Berlin, Germany, and subsequently served as general manager of opera houses in that city and in Darmstadt.

While in Berlin he married a Russian ballerina, Nina Schelemskaya-Schlesnaya. In 1934, with the rise of Nazi Germany, the Bings moved to the United Kingdom, where, in 1946, he became a naturalised British subject. There, together with Fritz Busch and Carl Ebert, he helped to found the Glyndebourne Festival Opera. After the war in 1947, he co-founded and was the first director of the Edinburgh International Festival in Scotland.

=== Metropolitan Opera ===
In 1949, he moved to the United States, and became General Manager of the Metropolitan Opera the following year, a post he held for 22 years. During the 1960s, he supervised the move of the old Metropolitan on Broadway and 39th Street, to its new quarters in Lincoln Center and presided over one of the most prominent eras of the Met. It was summed up in 1990 by James Oestreich in The New York Times as follows:

"Wielding his powerful position at the Metropolitan Opera with intense personal charisma over two decades, Sir Rudolf Bing ruled much of the operatic universe in autocratic fashion, nurturing young artists and cutting superstars down to size with equal enthusiasm. He oversaw the abandonment in 1966 of the stately but somewhat dilapidated old Metropolitan Opera House [which he then had razed] and the construction of a grand monument to his regime, the building the company now occupies, which dominates Lincoln Center. His conservative musical and dramatic bent, preference for Italian opera and concern for theatrical values yielded an identifiable artistic legacy."

During Bing's tenure the Met's artist roster became integrated for the first time. Marian Anderson became the first African American to sing a leading role in 1955. She was soon followed by Robert McFerrin, Gloria Davy, Mattiwilda Dobbs, Leontyne Price, George Shirley, Grace Bumbry, Shirley Verrett, Reri Grist, and many others. He was noted for his preference for European singers and an apparent lack of interest in some leading American performers. Beverly Sills had to wait until after Bing's retirement to make her Met debut in 1975, although Bing later said that not engaging Sills earlier was a mistake. He fostered the careers of many American artists. Roberta Peters, Leontyne Price, Anna Moffo, Sherrill Milnes, and Jess Thomas are just a few that flourished during his time.

Bing is also remembered for his stormy relationship with the era's most famous soprano, Maria Callas. After hiring her for the Met with a debut as Norma on opening night in 1956, he famously canceled her contract in 1958 when they could not come to terms regarding the roles she would sing. Bing invited Callas to return to the Met for two performances of Tosca in 1965, the year that turned out to be her final season in opera.

After leaving the Met, Bing wrote two books of memoirs, 5000 Nights at the Opera (1972) and A Knight at the Opera (1981).

=== Personal life ===
While living in Berlin, Bing married the Russian ballerina Nina Schelemskaya-Schlesnaya in 1928. They remained together until her death in 1983. They had no children.

In January 1987, when Bing was suffering from Alzheimer's disease, he married Carroll Douglass, a 45-year-old woman with a history of mental illness, who then took him, in violation of a court order, on a 10-month-long excursion to Florida, then Anguilla, and eventually to Italy and the United Kingdom, where she had sought to buy Rolls-Royce automobiles and a helicopter to give to the Pope, for whom she had a fixation. The couple were found living in a homeless shelter in Leeds, England, before being coaxed to return to New York by Sir Rudolf's lawyers. By 1989, a lawyer for Bing reported that his estate had been reduced during the marriage from $900,000 to less than $200,000, much of it spent on bodyguards hired to keep Douglass from spiriting him out of New York.

For this reason, and owing to Bing's mental impairment, a New York state court in September declared him incompetent to enter into a marriage contract and annulled the union. Douglass was a patient in the psychiatric ward of Bellevue Hospital at the time and received no settlement except $25,000 to cover hospital expenses.

=== Final years ===
In May 1989, Roberta Peters and Teresa Stratas arranged for Bing to be admitted to the Hebrew Home for the Aged in the Riverdale section of the Bronx, New York, where he resided until his death. Bing died from respiratory failure as a complication of Alzheimer's disease on September 2, 1997, aged 95, at St. Joseph's Hospital in Yonkers, New York. He is buried in Woodlawn Cemetery in the Bronx.

== Honors ==
In New Year Honours List of 1956, Queen Elizabeth II appointed Bing a Commander of the Order of the British Empire (CBE) for "services to music." In 1971, he was appointed a Knight Commander of the Order of the British Empire (KBE) for "services to Anglo-American relations," becoming Sir Rudolf Bing. Throughout his years in America, Bing had remained a British citizen. In 1973, Bing received the Grand Decoration of Honour in Gold for Services to the Republic of Austria.

== Publications ==
- Bing, Rudolf, 5000 Nights at the Opera: The Memoirs of Sir Rudolf Bing, New York: Doubleday, 1972. ISBN 0-385-09259-8
- Bing, Rudolf, A Knight at the Opera, New York: Putnam, 1981. ISBN 0-399-12653-8

Preceded by Edward Johnson	General Manager of the Metropolitan Opera; 1950–1972	Succeeded by Göran Gentele
