= Keve Hjelm =

Swedish actor (1922–2004)

Karl Evert "Keve" Hjelm
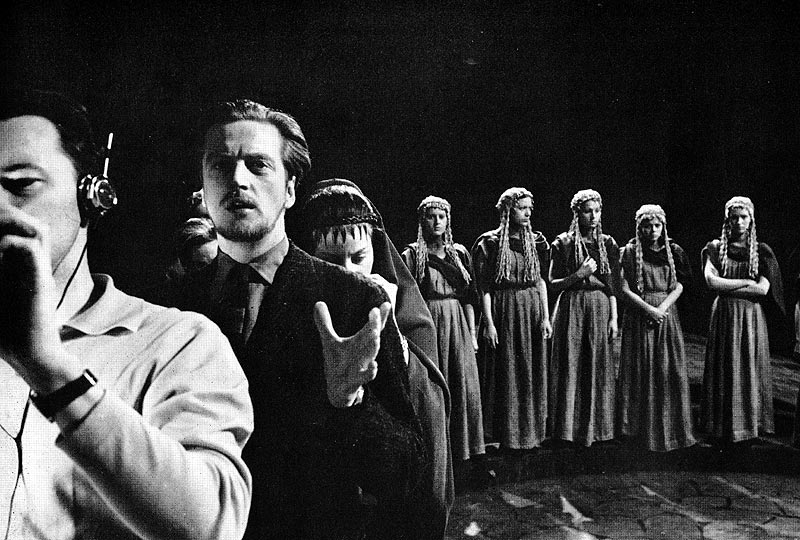
- Keve Hjelm directs Medea by Euripides
- Born: 23 June 1922; Gnesta, Sweden
- Died: 3 February 2004 (aged 81); Stockholm, Sweden
- Occupations: Actor, film director
- Years active: 1943–2004
- Spouse: Ingrid Håkanson (m. 1946)
- Children: 4

Karl Evert "Keve" Hjelm (23 June 1922 – 3 February 2004) was a Swedish actor and film director. He appeared in 70 films between 1943 and 2004. At the 1st Guldbagge Awards he won the award for Best Actor for his role in Raven's End. At the 15th Guldbagge Awards he won the Special Achievement award.

In 1946, Hjelm married Ingrid Håkanson (born 1922), daughter of merchant Emil Håkanson and Frida, née Westerberg. He was the father of Åsa-Lena (born 1947), Kåre (born 1951), Ola (born 1953) and Matti (born 1960).

== Selected filmography ==
- Det spökar - det spökar ... (1943) - Young man entering the beauty parlor (uncredited)
- Natt i hamn (1943) - Young man at 'Kontinenten' (uncredited)
- När ängarna blommar (1946) - Farm worker (uncredited)
- Krigsmans erinran (1947) - Stableman (uncredited)
- The Girl from the Marsh Croft (1947) - Johan
- Rail Workers (1947) - Natan (uncredited)
- On These Shoulders (1948) - Simon Loväng
- The Street (1949) - Rudolf 'Rulle' Malm
- Kvinnan som försvann (1949) - Göran Arnolds
- Girl with Hyacinths (1950) - Capt. Brink - Dagmar's Husband
- Sköna Helena (1951) - Lager Myrten
- Flottans glada gossar (1954) - Drunk Englishman (uncredited)
- A Lesson in Love (1954) - Guest at Wedding (uncredited)
- Night Child (1956) - Berra (uncredited)
- A Dreamer's Journey (1957) - Karl-Anton
- Never in Your Life (1957) - Rabatten
- We at Väddö (1958) - Daniel Sundberg
- Hide and Seek (1963) - Sosostro
- Mordvapen till salu (1963) - Ralph Hökmosse
- Raven's End (1963) - The Father
- Love 65 (1965) - Keve
- Night Games (1966) - Jan
- Life's Just Great (1967) - Roland
- Roseanna (1967) - Martin Beck
- Bränt barn (1967) - Knut Lundin
- Vindingevals (1968) - The Man
- Fanny Hill (1968) - Leif Henning
- Som natt och dag (1969) - Prof. Erland Roos
- Grisjakten (1970) - Sivert Gård
- Nana (1970) - Von Falke
- Brother Carl (1971) - Martin Ericsson
- Faire l'amour : De la pilule à l'ordinateur (1971)
- Ungkarlshotellet (1975) - Göte Löv
- Fru Inger til Østråt (1975) - Jens Bjelke
- Hello Baby (1976) - Director
- Bluff Stop (1977) - Erland
- Min älskade (1979) - Bernard
- Blomstrande tider (1980) - Henry
- Limpan (1983) - Farmer
- Svarta fåglar (1983) - Lindtner
- Rainfox (1984) - John Ericson
- Den frusna leoparden (1986) - The Father
- Hud (1986) - Sigurd - Vilde's Stepfather
- Creditors (1988) - Gustav
- 1939 (1989) - Alfred Hall
- Måker (1991) - Even
- The Best Intentions (1992) - Fredrik Bergman
- Hører du ikke hva jeg sier! (1995) - Goran
- Nu är pappa trött igen (1996) - Kökschefen
- Svenska hjältar (1997) - Egon
- Dykaren (2000) - Gösta
- Blodsbröder (2005) - Old art dealer
