= Peter Lindgren (actor) =

Swedish actor (1915–1981)

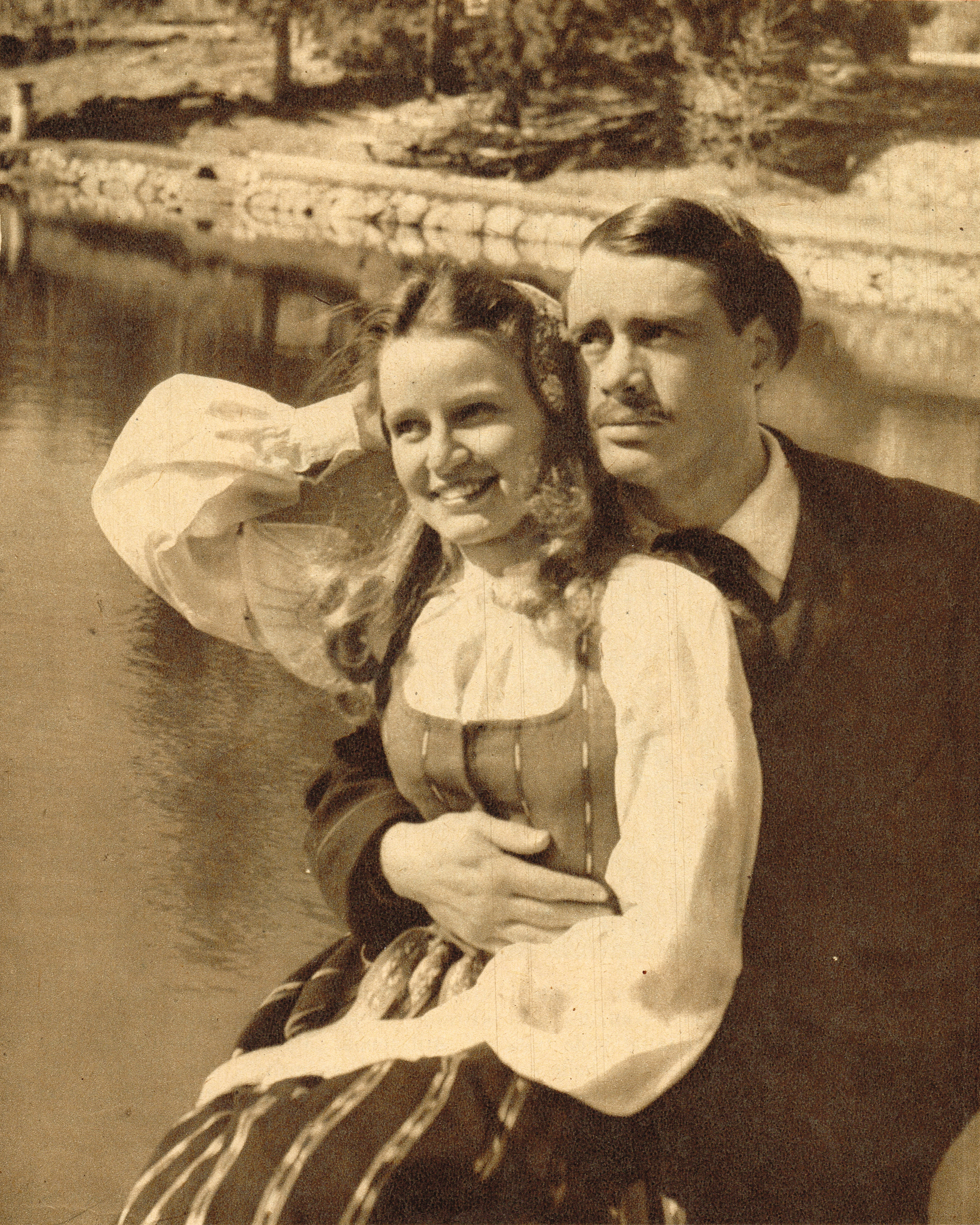
- Lindgren with Ulla Andréasson in 1949
- Born: Peter Edvin Lindgren; 13 December 1915; Lidingö, Sweden
- Died: 30 May 1981 (aged 65); Stockholm, Sweden
- Spouse(s): Marianne Nielsen (m. 1937–1941) Anna-Stina Osslund (m. 1941–1945) Topsy Håkansson (m. 1946–1951) Gunnel Eklund (m. 1972–1981)
- Children: Monica Nielsen; Hans Lindgren
- Relatives: Lars-Magnus Lindgren (brother)

Peter Edvin Lindgren (13 December 1915 – 30 May 1981) was a Swedish actor. His many roles include the part of Lena's father in I Am Curious (Yellow) (1967) and I Am Curious (Blue) (1968). He won the award for best actor at the 16th Guldbagge Awards for his role in I Am Maria.

He was the father of actress Monica Nielsen.

== Selected filmography ==
- Med folket för fosterlandet (1938) - Striker (uncredited)
- Du gamla du fria! (1938) - Lundström (uncredited)
- Frun tillhanda (1939) - Young Man (uncredited)
- With Open Arms (1940) - Student (uncredited)
- Snapphanar (1941) - Guerilla soldier (uncredited)
- Meeting in the Night (1946) - Filarn
- Evening at the Djurgarden (1946) - Nicke
- Iris and the Lieutenant (1946) - Svante (engineer)
- A Ship Bound for India (1947) - Foreign sailor (uncredited)
- Det kom en gäst... (1947) - Pastorn
- Bill Bergson, Master Detective (1947) - Tjommen
- The People of Simlang Valley (1947) - Tattar-Jan
- Hammarforsens brus (1948) - Anders
- The Street (1949) - Bertil 'Berra' Wiring
- Big Lasse of Delsbo (1949) - Klas Hägglund
- The Realm of the Rye (1950) - Markus
- To mistenkelige personer (1950) - Ekstrøm
- Stronger Than the Law (1951) - Manuel
- Encounter with Life (1952) - Gun's Friend
- Flottare med färg (1952) - Ivar Persson
- Ursula - Flickan i Finnskogarna (1953) - Arne
- Barabbas (1953) - Soldier which Assaulted Gang (uncredited)
- Our Father and the Gypsy (1954) - Mickel
- The Vicious Breed (1954) - Inmate
- Voyage in the Night (1955) - Berra
- Savnet siden mandag (1955)
- The Summer Wind Blows (1955) - Gustav-Adolf Hållman
- Mord, lilla vän (1955) - Valter Smitt
- Night Child (1956) - Bruno (uncredited)
- Swing it, fröken (1956) - Bi
- A Dreamer's Journey (1957) - Anders Kolare
- Blondin i fara (1957) - Night Club Customer
- Never in Your Life (1957) - Ärtan
- Do You Believe in Angels? (1961) - Poker player (uncredited)
- Hide and Seek (1963) - Intellektuelle Johansson (uncredited)
- Träfracken (1966) - Grevén
- I Am Curious (Yellow) (1967) - Rune Nyman
- I Am Curious (Blue) (1968) - Lena's Father
- Vindingevals (1968) - Söder
- We Are All Demons (1969) - First Mate
- The New Land (1972) - Samuel Nöjd
- Maria Marusjka (1973) - Ewert, fyrvokter
- Ebon Lundin (1973) - Fyllo
- Gangsterfilmen (1974) - Hans Nilsson
- Lejonet och jungfrun (1975) - Blomberg
- Garaget (1975) - Adolphson
- City of My Dreams (1976) - Storsäcken
- Drömmen om Amerika (1976) - Per-Olov
- Kejsaren (1979) - Sjökapten
- Linus eller Tegelhusets hemlighet (1979) - Medlem av stråkkvartett
- Lucie (1979) - Rapist
- I Am Maria (1979) - Jon
- Blomstrande tider (1980) - Joel
- Lyckliga vi... (1980) - The Old Swedish Man
- Sverige åt svenskarna (1980) - Swedish soldier
- Arme, syndige menneske (1980) - Swedish sailor
