= Per Oscarsson =

Swedish actor (1927–2010)

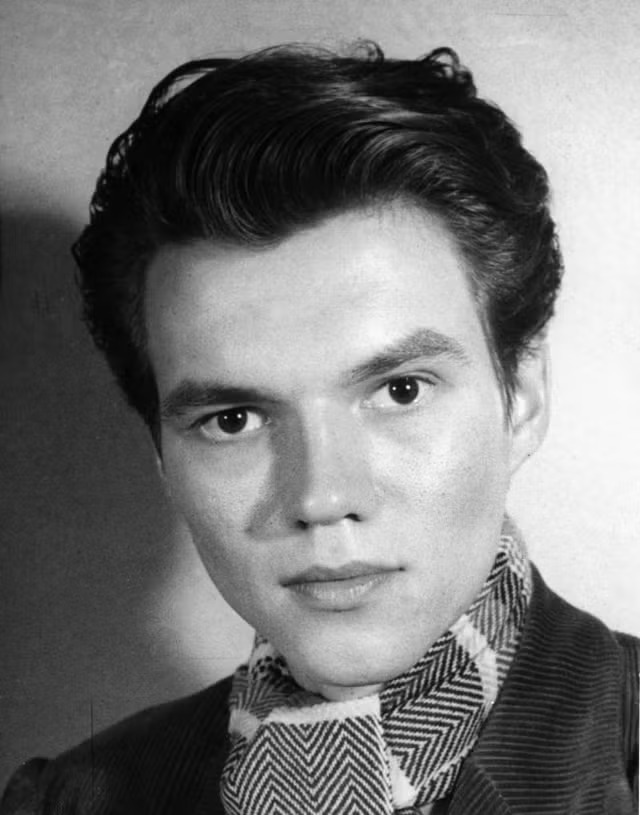
- Oscarsson in 1948
- Born: Per Oscar Heinrich Oscarsson; 28 January 1927; Stockholm, Sweden
- Died: 31 December 2010 (aged 83); Skara, Sweden
- Citizenship: Sweden
- Occupation: Actor
- Years active: 1944–2009
- Spouses: Gerd Hegnell (m. 1954; div. 1960) Bärbel Krämer (m. 1962; div. 1973) Kia Östling (m. 1989; died 2010)
- Children: 6

Per Oscar Heinrich Oscarsson (28 January 1927 – 31 December 2010) was a Swedish actor. He is best known for his role in the 1966 film Hunger, which earned him a Cannes Film Festival Award for Best Actor.

== Early life ==
Oscarsson and his twin brother Björn were born on 28 January 1927 in Kungsholmen, Stockholm, to Einar Oscarsson, an engineer, and Therèse, née Küppers. They had two elder siblings. Their mother, who was German, died of cancer in 1933.

== Career ==
Oscarsson was best known for his role as Pontus, a starving writer, in the social realism drama Hunger, based on the 1890 Knut Hamsun novel by the same name, a role for which he won the 1966 Bodil, the Guldbagge Award for Best Actor in a Leading Role and the 1966 Cannes Film Festival best actor awards. His most recent film role was as Holger Palmgren, the character Lisbeth Salander's publicly appointed guardian, in the 2009 movies The Girl Who Played with Fire and The Girl Who Kicked the Hornets' Nest, based on Stieg Larsson's famous novels.

== Death ==
A fire started in the house of Per Oscarsson and his wife Kia Östling on the night of 30–31 December 2010. On 31 December, a relative found the house burned to the ground with only the foundations and chimney remaining. Oscarsson had not been heard from since the fire. A body was discovered in the ruins of the house on 2 January 2011, and was presumed by police to be either the body of Oscarsson or that of his wife. A second body was discovered on 3 January, which increased the possibility that both Oscarsson and his wife had perished in the fire. On 5 January, the deaths of Oscarsson and his wife were confirmed through dental records by Swedish police. Oscarsson died at age 83.

== Selected filmography ==
- Eaglets (1944) - Young Man (uncredited)
- Prince Gustaf (1944) - Prince August
- Flickor i hamn (1945) - Young Man (uncredited)
- The Serious Game (1945) - Filip Stille, Lydia's Brother (uncredited)
- Kristin Commands (1946) - Jan Westman (uncredited)
- Youth in Danger (1946) - Stickan
- The Loveliest Thing on Earth (1947) - Tomas Isakson
- The Street (1949) - Åke Rodelius
- Son of the Sea (1949) - Rolf Bakken
- Vi flyr på Rio (1949) - Helmer Wallberg
- Living on 'Hope' (1951)- Per
- Encounter with Life (1952) - Robert
- Defiance (1952) - Rolf Thörner
- Barabbas (1953) - Boy
- Vi tre debutera (We Three Debutantes) (1953) - Lillebror Brummer
- Karin Månsdotter (1954) - Anders
- Wild Birds (1955) - Nisse Bortom
- Kärlek på turné (Ingen så tokig som jag) (1955) - Oskar Ölander
- Fröken April (Miss April) (1958) - Sverker Ek
- Lovely Is the Summer Night (1961) - Lars-Ove Larsson
- Ticket to Paradise (1962) - Freddo Rossi
- Vaxdockan (The Doll) (1962) - Lundgren
- Det är hos mig han har varit (1963) - Hans Treve
- Adam och Eva (Adam and Eve) (1963) - Reverend Helge Kall
- Någon av er (1963, TV Movie)
- Är du inte riktigt klok? (1964) - Man without character
- Bödeln (1965, TV Movie) - Galg-Lasse
- Asmodeus (1966, TV Movie) - Blaise Couture
- Syskonbädd 1782 (My Sister My Love) (1966) - Jacob / Brother
- Doktor Knock (1966, TV Movie)
- Hunger (1966) - Pontus
- Myten (1966) - Guest
- Patrasket (1966, TV Movie) - Joe Meng
- ABC Stage 67 (1966, TV Series) - Olaf Helton
- Here's Your Life (1966) - Niklas
- Trettondagsafton (1967, TV Movie) - Andreas Blek af Nosen
- Drottningens juvelsmycke (1967, TV Mini-Series) - Richard Furumo
- De Löjliga preciöserna (1967, TV Movie) - Jodelet
- Ghosts (1967, TV Movie) - Osvald Alving
- Who Saw Him Die? (1968) - Sören Mårtensson
- A Dandy in Aspic (1968) - Pavel
- Doctor Glas (1968) - Dr. Glas
- Vindingevals (1968) - The Baptiser
- An-Magritt (1969) - Hedström
- Oss emellan (Between Us, Close to the Wind) (1969) - Per Olofsson
- La Madriguera (Honeycomb) (1969) - Pedro
- Miss and Mrs Sweden (1969) - Jonne
- Love Is War (1970) - Mann med ønskekvist
- The Last Valley (1971) - Father Sebastian
- The Night Visitor (1971) - Dr. Anton Jenks
- Secrets (1971) - Raoul Kramer
- The New Land (1972) - Pastor Törner
- Endless Night (1972) - Santonix
- Inferno (1973, TV Movie) - August Strindberg
- The Blockhouse (1973) - Lund
- Dream City (1973) - Florian Sand
- The Blue Hotel (1973, TV Movie) - The Swede
- Ebon Lundin (1973) - Ebon Lundin
- Gangsterfilmen (A Stranger Came by Train) (1974) - Johan Gustavsson
- The Metamorphosis (1976) - Managing Clerk
- Dagny (1977) - August Strindberg
- Terror of Frankenstein (aka Victor Frankenstein) (1977) - The Monster
- Uppdraget (The Assignment) (1977) - Sixto
- The Brothers Lionheart (1977) - Orvar
- The Adventures of Picasso (1978) - Apollinaire
- Chez nous (1978) - Schrenk
- Kristoffers hus (Christopher's House) (1979) - Kräftan
- Charlotte Löwensköld (1979) - Pontus Friman
- Hello Sweden (1979)
- Tvingad att leva (1980)
- Attentatet (Outrage) (1980) - Doctor
- Sverige åt svenskarna (Battle of Sweden, Sweden for the Swedes) (1980) - Gustav Leonard Vinkelhjern Klosterhjerta / Jean Louis VIII / Karl Brecht der Stärkste und der Grösste / Wilfred Himmelthrill XIII
- The Sleep of Death (The Inn of the Flying Dragon) (1980) - Col. Gaillard
- Montenegro (1981) - Dr. Aram Pazardjian
- Kallocain (1981, TV Mini-Series) - Försöksperson nr 135
- Göta kanal eller Vem drog ur proppen? (1981) - Ulf Svensson
- Hans Christian och sällskapet (1981, TV Movie) - Georg
- Polisen som vägrade svara (1982, TV Mini-Series) - Gustav Jörgensson
- Historien om lilla och stora kanin (1983, Short) - Narrator (voice)
- Master Olof (1983, TV Mini-Series) - Hans Windrank
- Henrietta (1983) - Einar
- Vargen (1984, TV Movie) - Arnold Wolf
- Polisen som vägrade ge upp (1984, TV Mini-Series) - Gustav Jörgensson
- Ronia, the Robber's Daughter (1984) - Borka
- Da Capo (1985) - Eino
- Hud (1986) - The Vicar
- Nattseilere (1986) - With
- Bödeln och skökan (1986, TV Movie) - Fogden
- Flykten (1986, TV Mini-Series)
- Ondskans år (1987, TV Movie) - The Estate Owner
- Nattseilere (1988, TV Mini-Series) - With
- Oväder (1988, TV Movie) - Brodern
- Venus 90 (1988) - Erlandson, Vraket
- Polisen som vägrade ta semester (1988, TV Mini-Series) - Gustav Jörgensson
- Kråsnålen (1988, TV Mini-Series) - Himself
- Ingen rövare finns i skogen (1988, Short) - Fiolito
- 1939 (1989) - Isak
- Kurt Olsson - The Film About My Life as Myself (1990) - Personell [sic?] Manager Lindroth
- Bulan (1990) - The poet
- Fasadklättraren (1991, TV Mini-Series) - Larsson
- House of Angels (1992) - Erik Zander
- Kejsarn av Portugallien (1992–1993, TV Mini-Series) - Ol-Bengtsa
- Polisen och domarmordet (1993, TV Mini-Series) - Gustav Jörgensson
- Dreaming of Rita (1993) - Bob
- Cross My Heart and Hope to Die (1994) - Pianostemmeren
- Kan du vissla Johanna? (1994, TV Movie) - Nils
- Polisen och pyromanen (TV mini-series) (1996)
- Harry och Sonja (1996) - Harry's Father
- Juloratoriet (Christmas Oratorio) (1996) - Fälldin
- Germans (Jubilee, the Darkest Hour) (1996) - Prof. Sonnenbruch
- The Last Viking (1997) - Skrælling
- Rika barn leka bäst (1997) - Vilhelm
- Ogginoggen (1997, Short) - Dansedommeren
- Forbudt for børn (1998) - Dansedommer
- Stormen (1998, TV Movie) - Gonzalo
- White Water Fury (2000) - Åke
- Herr von Hancken (2000, TV Mini-Series) - Herr von Hancken
- Anderssons älskarinna (2001, TV Mini-Series) - Elof
- Send mere slik (Send More Candy) (2001) - Rasmus
- Stora teatern (2002, TV Mini-Series) - Berra
- Midsommer (Midsummer) (2003) - Persson
- Manden bag døren (The Bouncer, The Man Behind the Door) (2003) - Karl
- Att sörja Linnea (2004, TV Movie) - Allan
- Young Andersen (Young Andersen) (2005) - H.C. Andersens farfar
- Those Who Whisper (2006, TV Movie) - Pappan
- The Girl Who Played with Fire (2009) - Holger Palmgren
- The Girl Who Kicked the Hornets' Nest (2009) - Holger Palmgren (uncredited)
- Tysta leken (2011) - Oscar (final film role)
