= Fridolf Stands Up! =

1958 film

- Directed by: Torgny Anderberg
- Written by: Rune Moberg
- Produced by: Gunnar Lundin
- Starring: Douglas Håge; Hjördis Petterson; Lars Ekborg
- Cinematography: Max Wilén
- Edited by: Carl-Olov Skeppstedt
- Music by: Lennart Fors
- Production company: Nordisk Tonefilm
- Distributed by: Nordisk Tonefilm
- Release date: 25 August 1958
- Running time: 88 minutes
- Country: Sweden
- Language: Swedish

Fridolf Stands Up! (Swedish: Fridolf sticker opp!) is a 1958 Swedish comedy film directed by Torgny Anderberg and starring Douglas Håge, Hjördis Petterson and Lars Ekborg. The film's sets were designed by the art director Bibi Lindström. It was one of a series of films featuring Håge as Fridolf Olsson.

== Cast ==
- Douglas Håge as Fridolf Olsson
- Hjördis Petterson as Selma Olsson
- Lars Ekborg as Valdemar Palm
- Inga Gill as Maggan Palm
- Karl-Arne Holmsten as Egon Lönn
- Mona Malm as Lisa Dahlman
- Jan Molander as Grillhagen
- Olle Hilding as Nilsson
- Kotti Chave as Skarvik
- Bo Thörner as Lillen
- Hans Strååt as Fridh
- Ivar Wahlgren as Gustavsson
- Emy Hagman as Selma's Friend
- Olof Thunberg as Driving Instructor
- Arthur Fischer as Manager
- Sten Lindgren as Government Official
- Astrid Bodin as Woman at Kvinnogillet Dinner
- Birger Lensander as Man at Fountain

== Bibliography ==
- Krawc, Alfred. International Directory of Cinematographers, Set- and Costume Designers in Film: Denmark, Finland, Norway, Sweden (from the beginnings to 1984). Saur, 1986.
