= Sif Ruud =

Swedish actress (1916–2011)

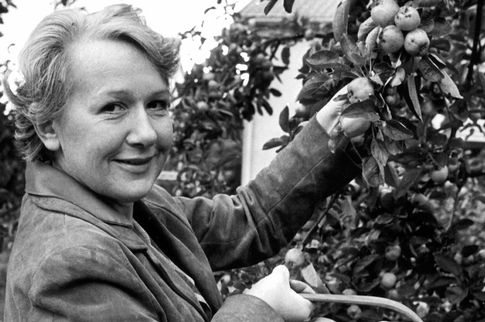
- Sif Ruud in 1962.
- Born: Sif Einarsdotter Ruud; 6 May 1916; Stockholm, Sweden
- Died: 15 August 2011 (aged 95); Stockholm, Sweden
- Other name: Sif Einarsdotter Ruud Fallde
- Occupation: Actress
- Years active: 1938–2001
- Spouses: Sune Bergström; (m. 1944–1953): Per-Olof Fallde; (m. 1954–2007)

Sif Einarsdotter Ruud Fallde born Sif Einarsdotter Ruud (6 May 1916 – 15 August 2011), best known as Sif Ruud, was a Swedish film actress. Born in Stockholm to Einar Ruud and Inez Engström, she began her career in 1938, and appeared in 140 films. At the 15th Guldbagge Awards she won the award for Best Actress for her role in A Walk in the Sun.

== Selected filmography ==
- Nothing Is Forgotten (1942)
- Kristin Commands (1946)
- It Rains on Our Love (1946)
- Johansson and Vestman (1946)
- How to Love (1947)
- Neglected by His Wife (1947)
- Dynamite (1947)
- Port of Call (1948)
- Girl from the Mountain Village (1948)
- On These Shoulders (1948)
- Lars Hård (1948)
- Love Wins Out (1949)
- Dangerous Spring (1949)
- Father Bom (1949)
- Thirst (1949)
- Only a Mother (1949)
- Playing Truant (1949)
- The Street (1949)
- Vagabond Blacksmiths (1949)
- To Joy (1950)
- Jack of Hearts (1950)
- Two Stories Up (1950)
- Divorced (1951)
- Encounter with Life (1952)
- Say It with Flowers (1952)
- Barabbas (1953)
- Hidden in the Fog (1953)
- Taxi 13 (1954)
- Storm Over Tjurö (1954)
- The Vicious Breed (1954)
- Paradise (1955)
- Moon Over Hellesta (1956)
- The Girl in Tails (1956)
- Det är aldrig för sent (1956)
- Girls Without Rooms (1956)
- Stage Entrance (1956)
- The Stranger from the Sky (1956)
- Wild Strawberries (1957) - Aunt Olga
- Miss April (1958)
- The Magician (1958)
- Laila (1958)
- The Lady in Black (1958)
- Heaven and Pancake (1959)
- The Beloved Game (1959)
- Good Friends and Faithful Neighbours (1960)
- The Die Is Cast (1960)
- Forelsket i København (1960)
- Summer and Sinners (1960)
- When Darkness Falls (1960)
- Lovely Is the Summer Night (1961)
- Ticket to Paradise (1962)
- The Lady in White (1962)
- Hide and Seek (1963)
- Hemsöborna (1966)
- A Handful of Love (1974)
- Face to Face (1976)
- Summer Paradise (1977)
- The Best Intentions (1992)
