= Ilselil Larsen =

Danish actress (1934–2025)

- Born: 1 July 1934; Århus, Denmark
- Died: 25 May 2025 (aged 90)
- Occupation: Actress
- Years active: 1940–1958

Ilselil Larsen (1 July 1934 – 25 May 2025) was a Danish actress who appeared in 16 films between 1940 and 1958 during the Golden Age of Danish cinema. She was born in Århus, Denmark. Larsen died on 25 May 2025, at the age of 90.

== Filmography ==
- Lyssky transport gennem Danmark (1958)
- Skovridergaarden (1957)
- Mig og min familie (1957)
- Cirkus Fandango (1954)
- Far til fire (1953)
- Vejrhanen (1952)
- Dorte (1951)
- Love Wins Out (1949)
- Mikkel (1949)
- Det gælder os alle (1949)
- Ny dag gryer, En (1945)
- Affæren Birte (1945)
- Mit liv er musik (1944)
- Familien Gelinde (1944)
- Vi kunde ha' det saa rart (1942)
- Barnet (1940)
