= Johansson and Vestman =

1946 film

- Directed by: Olof Molander
- Written by: Karl Staaff (play); Rune Lindström
- Starring: Holger Löwenadler; Sture Lagerwall; Wanda Rothgardt
- Cinematography: Åke Dahlqvist
- Edited by: Tage Holmberg
- Music by: Sven Sköld
- Production company: Svensk Filmindustri
- Release date: 3 September 1946
- Running time: 80 minutes
- Country: Sweden
- Language: Swedish

Johansson and Vestman (Swedish:Johansson och Vestman) is a 1946 Swedish drama film directed by Olof Molander and starring Holger Löwenadler, Sture Lagerwall and Wanda Rothgardt. The script is based on the 1917 play of the same title by Karl Staaff. The film's sets were designed by the art director Arne Åkermark.

== Cast ==
- Holger Löwenadler as Adolf Johansson
- Sture Lagerwall as Vestman
- Wanda Rothgardt as Helena Bergfors
- Håkan Westergren as Hugo Bergfors
- Hjördis Petterson as Beda, cook
- Naemi Briese as Olga Hallman
- Gösta Ericsson as Swahn, driver
- Nils Hultgren as Modig
- Manne Grünberger as Klein
- Stig Olin as Rusan
- Karl Erik Flens as Seger
- Gunnar Almqvist as Man at the exposition
- Carl Andersson as Parish constable's assistant
- Sven Arvor as Guest at the birthday party
- Karin Crispién as Lieutenant's fiancée
- Paul Hagman as Doorman at Stadt
- Sten Hedlund as Parish constable
- Oscar Heurlin as Guest at the birthday party
- Kjell Högberg as Bengt Bergfors
- Lilly Kjellström
- Jan-Erik Larsson as Åke Bergfors
- Arne Lindblad as Maitre d'
- Theodor Olsson as Third speaker at the exposition
- Lennart Pettersson as Second speaker at the exposition
- Gösta Prüzelius as Lieutenant
- Erik Rosén
- Sif Ruud as Mrs. Larsson, cook
- Marion Sundh as Woman at the funfair
- Siv Ulvhammar as Mrs. Gustafsson
- Karin Windahl as Guest at the birthday party
- Birgitta Öijen as Waitress

== Bibliography ==
- Kaplan, Mike. Variety Film Reviews 1907-1980, Volume 16. Taylor & Francis, 1985.
