= Café Lunchrasten =

1954 film

- Directed by: Hampe Faustman
- Written by: Herbert Grevenius
- Produced by: Rune Waldekranz
- Starring: Lars Ekborg; Doris Svedlund; Annalisa Ericson
- Cinematography: Curt Jonsson
- Edited by: Eric Nordemar
- Music by: Carl-Olof Anderberg
- Production company: Sandrews
- Distributed by: Sandrew-Baumanfilm
- Release date: 15 February 1954
- Running time: 80 minutes
- Country: Sweden
- Language: Swedish

Café Lunchrasten is a 1954 Swedish drama film directed by Hampe Faustman and starring Lars Ekborg, Doris Svedlund and Annalisa Ericson. It was shot at the Centrumateljéerna Studios in Stockholm. The plot revolves around a cafe in the old Klara district of Sweden's capital city, and the varied clientele who frequents it.

== Cast ==
- Lars Ekborg as Harald
- Doris Svedlund as Bojan, waitress
- Annalisa Ericson as Buttercup
- Nils Hallberg as Bernt
- Stig Järrel as Ali Baba
- Emy Hagman as Mia
- Douglas Håge as Albert Karlsson
- Eivor Landström as Cecilia, waitress
- Inger Juel as Steffy
- Solveig Hedengran as Ali Baba's Wife
- Per-Axel Arosenius as Police officer
- Helga Brofeldt as Sophia
- Ernst Eklund as Editor-in-chief
- Olle Hilding as Editor
- Gösta Holmström as Police officer
- Svea Holst as Woman with bucket
- Stig Johanson as Postman
- Birger Lensander as Clerk
- Arne Ragneborn as Bernt's friend
- Hanny Schedin as News paper dispenser
- Tage Severin as Bernt's friend
- Per Sjöstrand as Arty student
- Alexander von Baumgarten as Nicke
- Ivar Wahlgren as Youth prison director
- Catrin Westerlund as Hairdresser

== Bibliography ==
- Qvist, Per Olov & von Bagh, Peter. Guide to the Cinema of Sweden and Finland. Greenwood Publishing Group, 2000.
