= Gangsterfilmen =

1974 film

- Directed by: Lars G. Thelestam
- Written by: Max Lundgren
- Produced by: Bengt Forslund
- Starring: Clu Gulager
- Cinematography: Jörgen Persson
- Edited by: Lars Hagström
- Release date: 28 October 1974
- Running time: 105 minutes
- Country: Sweden
- Language: Swedish

Gangsterfilmen is a 1974 Swedish film directed by Lars G. Thelestam. It was entered into the 25th Berlin International Film Festival.

== Cast ==
- Clu Gulager as Glenn Mortenson
- Ernst Günther as Anders Andersson
- Per Oscarsson as Johan Gustavsson
- Anne-Lise Gabold
- Lou Castel
- Hans Alfredson as Manager at the pool hall
- Gudrun Brost as Anna Nilsson
- Carl-Axel Heiknert as Nils Nilsson
- Peter Lindgren as Hans Nilsson
- Gunnar Olsson as Karl
- Elina Salo
- Ulla Sjöblom as Kristina Nordbäck
- Inga Tidblad as Major's wife
- Marvin Yxner as Policeman
