= Catrin Westerlund =

Swedish actress

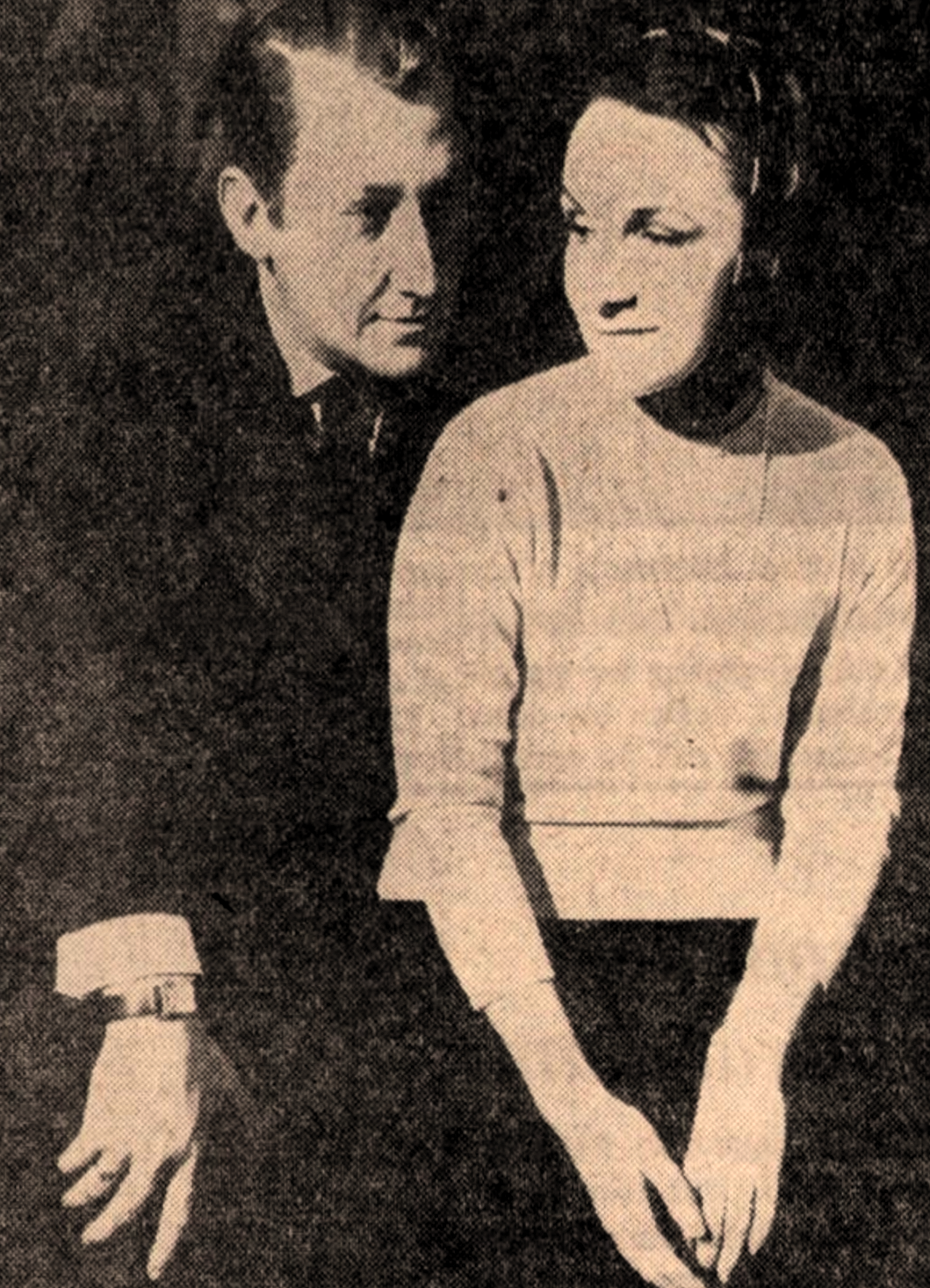
- Bengt Eklund and Catrin Westerlund in 1961
- Born: 10 April 1934; Stockholm, Sweden
- Died: 18 September 1982 (aged 48); Lidingö, Sweden
- Occupation: Actress
- Years active: 1953-1982

Catrin Westerlund (10 April 1934 – 18 September 1982) was a Swedish actress. She appeared in more than 40 films and television shows between 1953 and 1982.

== Selected filmography ==
- Marianne (1953)
- A Night in the Archipelago (1953)
- Café Lunchrasten (1954)
- The Vicious Breed (1954)
- Young Summer (1954)
- The Unicorn (1955)
- The Dance Hall (1955)
- Voyage in the Night (1955)
- Rätten att älska (1956)
- Girls Without Rooms (1956)
- My Passionate Longing (1956)
- Hide and Seek (1963)
- Swedish Wedding Night (1964)
- Want So Much To Believe (1971)
- Världens bästa Karlsson (1974)
- Sagan om Karl-Bertil Jonssons julafton (1975)
