= Adélaïde (film) =

- Directed by: Jean-Daniel Simon
- Written by: Jean-Daniel Simon
- Starring: Ingrid Thulin; Jean Sorel
- Cinematography: Patrice Pouget
- Music by: Pierre Vassiliu
- Release date: 1968
- Running time: 90 minutes
- Country: France
- Language: French

Adélaïde is a 1968 French drama film directed by Jean-Daniel Simon and starring Ingrid Thulin, Jean Sorel and Sylvie Fennec. In English it is sometimes known as The Depraved. It was based on a novella by Joseph-Arthur de Gobineau and produced by Pierre Kalfon.

== Plot ==
A young woman, named Adélaïde lives in France, and she is pursued by many suitors, but she turns them all down because her one true love has gone away to war, and she has not heard of him for months, though she does not give up hope and lies in wait of his return. In the end he dies in the war, killed by a German soldier, but she knows in her heart he is still with her.

== Cast ==
- Ingrid Thulin ... Elisabeth Hermann
- Jean Sorel ... Frédéric Cornault
- Sylvie Fennec ... Adelaide
- Jacques Portet ... Jacques Potier
- Faith Brook ... Dickson
- Jean-Pierre Bernard ... Christian
- Joëlle Bernard ... Janine
- Robert Higgins ... Médecin
- Eve Mylonas ... Alexa
- Christine Simon ... Buxy
- Simone Guisin ... Hélène
