= Carl-Axel Heiknert =

Swedish actor

- Born: 10 September 1924; Värnamo, Sweden
- Died: 12 October 1981 (aged 57); Stockholm, Sweden
- Occupation: Actor
- Years active: 1970-1981

Carl-Axel Heiknert (10 September 1924 – 12 October 1981) was a Swedish actor. He appeared in more than twenty films and television shows between 1970 and 1981.

== Selected filmography ==
- Gangsterfilmen (1974)
- The Man on the Roof (1976)
- Lyftet (1978)
- Poet and Muse (1978)
