= Girls Without Rooms =

1956 film

- Directed by: Arne Ragneborn
- Starring: Catrin Westerlund
- Release date: 26 March 1956
- Running time: 78 minutes
- Country: Sweden
- Language: Swedish

Girls Without Rooms (Swedish: Flamman) is a 1956 Swedish drama film directed by Arne Ragneborn.

== Cast ==
- Catrin Westerlund as Fransiska Karlsson
- Inga Gill as Agneta
- Marianne Löfgren as Patient
- Lissi Alandh as Fransiska's Work Colleague (as Lissi Aland)
- Eivor Engelbrektsson as Alice Karlsson
- Sissi Kaiser as Ulla (as Sissi Kayser)
- Sif Ruud as Prostitute
