= Merit Hertzman-Ericson =

Merit Kerstin Hertzman-Ericson, née Lundberg (4 February 1911 in Danderyd – 26 March 1998 in Saltsjöbaden) was a Swedish psychologist and author.

Hertzman-Ericson was the daughter of construction engineer Ernst Lundberg and Astrid Svensson. She was the sister of actress Marianne Nielsen and aunt to actress Monica Nielsen. She was also a grandmother of actress Pernilla August and artist Anna Hertzman-Ericson.

After graduating in Stockholm in 1930, Hertzman-Ericson continued at the Sorbonne University in Paris, after which she returned to Sweden, obtaining a B.A. in Stockholm in 1942 and PhL in 1946. She was a director at the New School School of 1942–1943, Clinical Psychologist at Stockholm Central for Psychic Children- and youth care from 1950, psychologist at the Stockholm City Children's Care Board, film censor for the Norwegian Film Agency. She was a secretary of the Swedish Association for Group Psychotherapy, board member of the Clinical Section at the Psychology Association.

In 1932, Hertzman-Ericson married engineer Bo Hertzman-Ericson. They had six children. Bo Hertzman-Ericson died in 1977.

Hertzman-Ericson died on 26 March 1998, at the age of 87.

== Publications ==
- The Child's Mental Development (1952)
- My Child is not Like Others (1954)
- Children are Children and What Children are Schoolers? (1956)
- Group Activities with Mothers in Mental Childcare and Youth Care (1958)
