= Hjördis Petterson =

Swedish actress

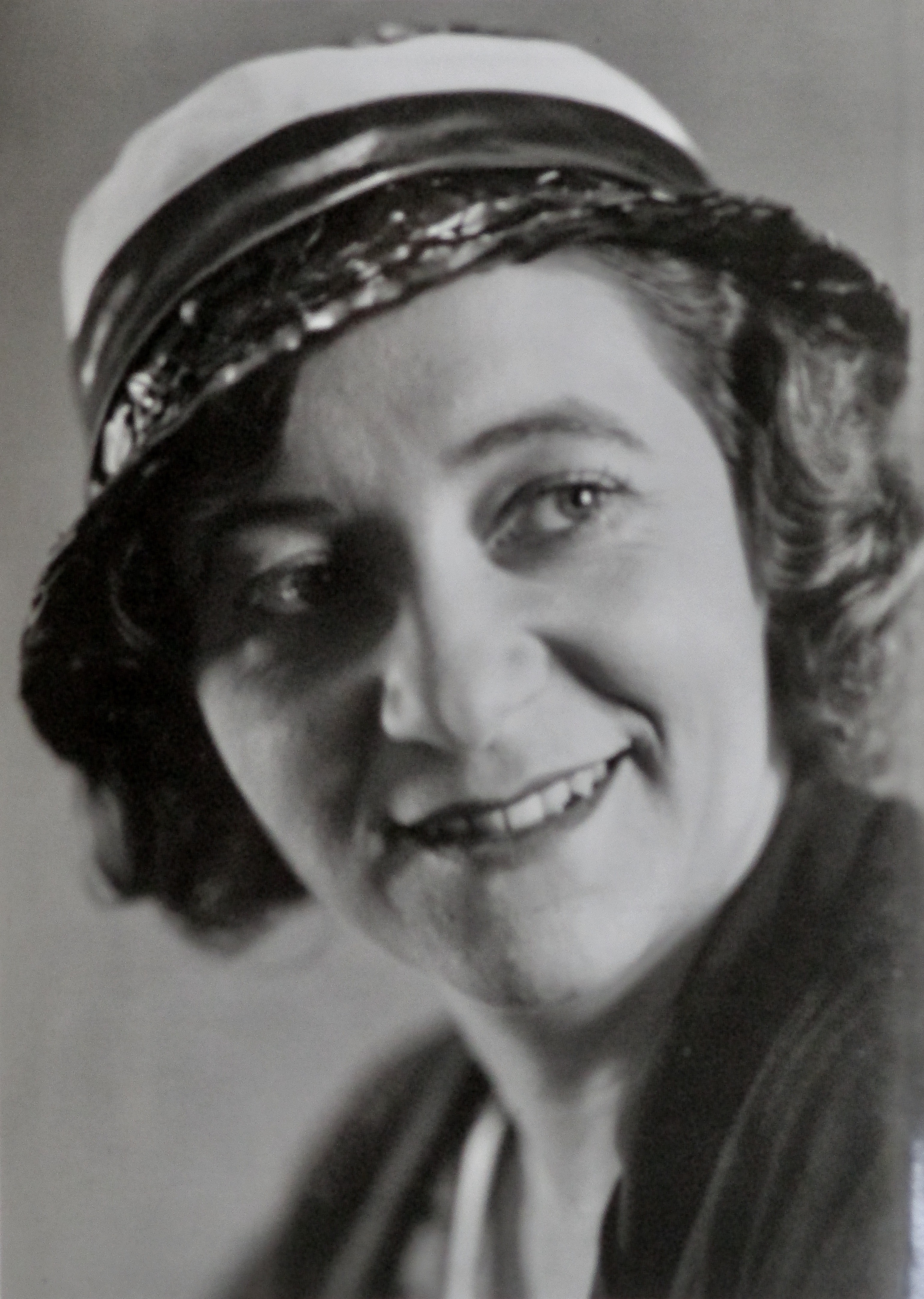
- Born: Hjördis Olga Maria Pettersson; 17 October 1908; Visby, Sweden
- Died: 27 May 1988 (aged 79); Stockholm, Sweden
- Occupation: Actress
- Years active: 1933–1985
- Spouse(s): Olle Lindholm (m. 1937–1939) Fred Renstroem (m. 1942–1949)

Hjördis Olga Maria Petterson (17 October 1908 – 27 May 1988) was a Swedish actress. She appeared in more than 140 films. She was born in Visby, Sweden and died in Stockholm. She had one child with her second husband, Fred Renstroem.

== Selected filmography ==
- Perhaps a Poet (1933)
- Eva Goes Aboard (1934)
- Synnöve Solbakken (1934)
- The Song to Her (1934)
- Andersson's Kalle (1934)
- It Pays to Advertise (1936)
- The Family Secret (1936)
- Adventure (1936)
- The Lady Becomes a Maid (1936)
- Snövit och de sju dvärgarna (1938)
- Styrman Karlssons flammor (1938)
- Kiss Her! (1940)
- With Open Arms (1940)
- The Fight Continues (1941)
- Only a Woman (1941)
- Lucky Young Lady (1941)
- Lasse-Maja (1941)
- Tomorrow's Melody (1942)
- We House Slaves (1942)
- Dangerous Ways (1942)
- The Sin of Anna Lans (1943)
- Imprisoned Women (1943)
- Dolly Takes a Chance (1944)
- The Serious Game (1945)
- The Journey Away (1945)
- It Rains on Our Love (1946)
- Johansson and Vestman (1946)
- While the Door Was Locked (1946)
- A Ship Bound for India (1947)
- The Bride Came Through the Ceiling (1947)
- Poor Little Sven (1947)
- Sunshine (1948)
- Jack of Hearts (1950)
- Living on 'Hope' (1951)
- In the Arms of the Sea (1951)
- Divorced (1951)
- Defiance (1952)
- Bom the Flyer (1952)
- In Lilac Time (1952)
- Classmates (1952)
- The Chieftain of Göinge (1953)
- Hidden in the Fog (1953)
- Stupid Bom (1953)
- Sju svarta be-hå (1954)
- Enchanted Walk (1954)
- Dance in the Smoke (1954)
- Dance on Roses (1954)
- Taxi 13 (1954)
- Flicka i kasern (1955)
- The Magnificent Lie (1955)
- The People of Hemsö (1955)
- The Girl in Tails (1956)
- A Doll's House (1956)
- Never in Your Life (1957)
- Bill Bergson Lives Dangerously (1957)
- Miss April (1958)
- Fridolf Stands Up! (1958)
- Sängkammartjuven (1959)
- Heaven and Pancake (1959)
- When Darkness Falls (1960)
- The Pleasure Garden (1961)
- Lovely Is the Summer Night (1961)
- The Lady in White (1962)
- Ticket to Paradise (1962)
- Sten Stensson Returns (1963)
- The Cats (1965)
- The Passion of Anna (1969)
- Andersson's Kalle on Top Form (1973)
- The Adventures of Picasso (1978)
- Children's Island (1980)
- Mask of Murder (1985)
