= A Night in the Archipelago =

1953 film

- Directed by: Bengt Logardt
- Written by: Sven Forssell; Bengt Logardt
- Produced by: Bengt Logardt
- Starring: Ingrid Thulin; Bengt Blomgren; Öllegård Wellton
- Cinematography: Curt Jonsson
- Edited by: Carl-Olov Skeppstedt
- Music by: Roland Eiworth; Anton Kotasek
- Production company: Sandrews
- Distributed by: Sandrew-Baumanfilm
- Release date: 12 December 1953
- Running time: 89 minutes
- Country: Sweden
- Language: Swedish

A Night in the Archipelago (Swedish: En skärgårdsnatt) is a 1953 Swedish drama film directed by Bengt Logardt and starring Ingrid Thulin, Bengt Blomgren and Öllegård Wellton. It was shot at the Centrumateljéerna Studios and on location at a variety of places around the Stockholm Archipelago.

== Cast ==
- Ingrid Thulin as Ingrid
- Bengt Logardt as Åke
- Bengt Blomgren as Björn
- Öllegård Wellton as Annika
- Rune Halvarsson as Sture Svensson
- Britta Brunius as Karin Svensson
- Catrin Westerlund as Astrid
- Gunlög Hagberg as Gullan
- Sten Gester as Bosse Levhagen
- Arne Ragneborn as 'Stålis'
- Lissi Alandh as Birgitta
- Tor Bergner as Dansbanegitarristen
- Julie Bernby as Servitris på Waxholm III
- Bernt Callenbo as Rolf
- Märta Dorff as Fru Lundkvist
- Gerd Ericsson as Liss, Ingrids väninna
- Bo Gunnar Eriksson as Tomas
- Sten Hedlund as Helge Lundkvist, ingenjör
- Sven Holmberg as Fjärdingsman
- Magnus Kesster as Hans kamrat
- Birgitta Kings as Christina
- Lennart Lundh as Hjalle, Bosses kamrat
- Jan-Olof Rydqvist as Kurre Hängläpp, kompis until Stålis
- Nils Stödberg as Fagerviksbo
- Anders Svahn as Fjärdingsmans medhjälpare
- Alf Östlund as Aff
- Ann-Margret Bjellder as Elsa
- Ingegerd Bjellder as Marta

== Bibliography ==
- Qvist, Per Olov & von Bagh, Peter. Guide to the Cinema of Sweden and Finland. Greenwood Publishing Group, 2000.
