= Living on 'Hope' =

1951 film

- Directed by: Göran Gentele
- Written by: Göran Gentele
- Produced by: Otto Scheutz
- Starring: Meg Westergren; Ingrid Thulin; Per Oscarsson; Gunvor Pontén
- Cinematography: Karl-Erik Alberts
- Edited by: Wic Kjellin
- Music by: Gösta Nystroem
- Production company: Europa Film
- Distributed by: Europa Film
- Release date: 11 April 1951
- Running time: 100 minutes
- Country: Sweden
- Language: Swedish

Living on 'Hope' (Swedish: Leva på 'Hoppet') is a 1951 Swedish comedy film directed and written by Göran Gentele and starring Meg Westergren, Ingrid Thulin, Per Oscarsson and Gunvor Pontén. It was shot at the Sundbyberg Studios of Europa Film in Stockholm and on location around the city. The film's sets were designed by the art director Arne Åkermark. At the 1st Berlin International Film Festival it won the Silver Bear (Comedies) award.

== Synopsis ==
Daydreaming theatre student Vivi imagines herself and her friends setting up a travelling theatrical troupe on an old cargo ship named 'Hope' (Hoppet) and enjoying a series of adventures.

== Cast ==
- Meg Westergren as Vivi
- Ingrid Thulin as Yvonne
- Per Oscarsson as Per
- Gunvor Pontén as Maj-Britt
- Jarl Kulle as Jalle
- Arne Ragneborn as Arne
- Hjördis Petterson as Teacher
- Olav Riégo as Teacher
- Tord Stål as Teacher
- Rudolf Wendbladh as Harry, mayor
- Anna-Lisa Baude as Hilda, mayoress
- Eric Gustafson as Advertising Executive
- Arthur Fischer as Yvonne's Father
- Wiktor Andersson as Office clerk
- Barbro Fleege as Office clerk
- Torsten Lilliecrona as Office clerk

== Bibliography ==
- Hjort, Mette & Lindqvist, Ursula. A Companion to Nordic Cinema. John Wiley & Sons, 2016.
- Qvist, Per Olov & von Bagh, Peter. Guide to the Cinema of Sweden and Finland. Greenwood Publishing Group, 2000.
