= Olle Länsberg =

Swedish screenwriter

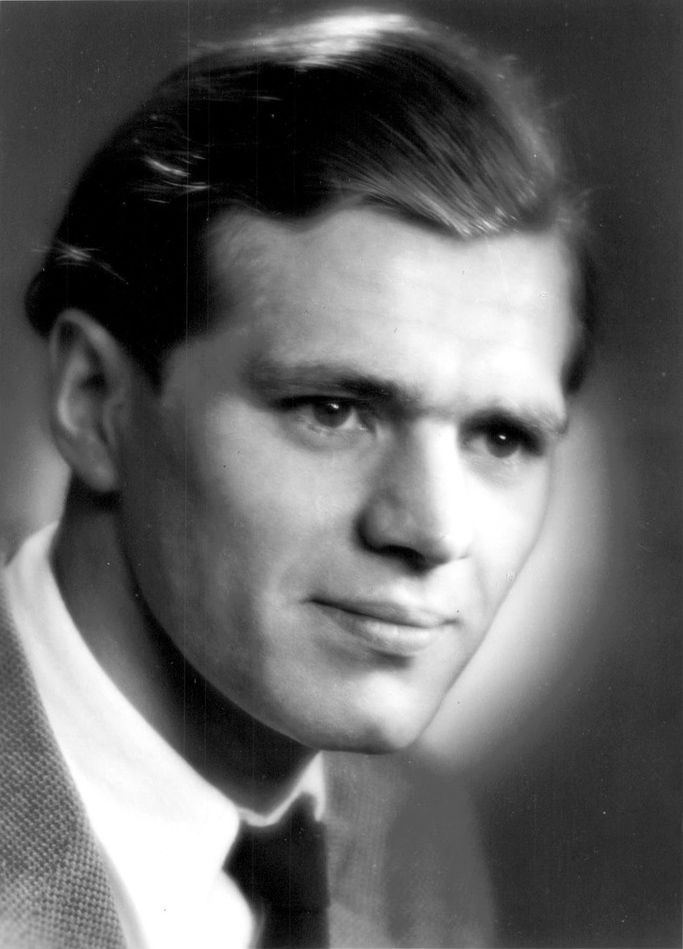
- Born: 28 March 1922; Gothenburg, Sweden
- Died: 28 September 1998 (aged 76); Varberg, Sweden
- Occupation: Screenwriter
- Years active: 1947–1973

Olle Länsberg (28 March 1922 – 28 September 1998) was a Swedish writer. He wrote for ten films between 1947 and 1973.

== Selected filmography ==
- Port of Call (1948)
- Skipper in Stormy Weather (1951)
- Violence (1955)
- The Hard Game (1956)
- A Goat in the Garden (1958)
- Dear John (1964)
