= Hans Abramson =

Swedish film director

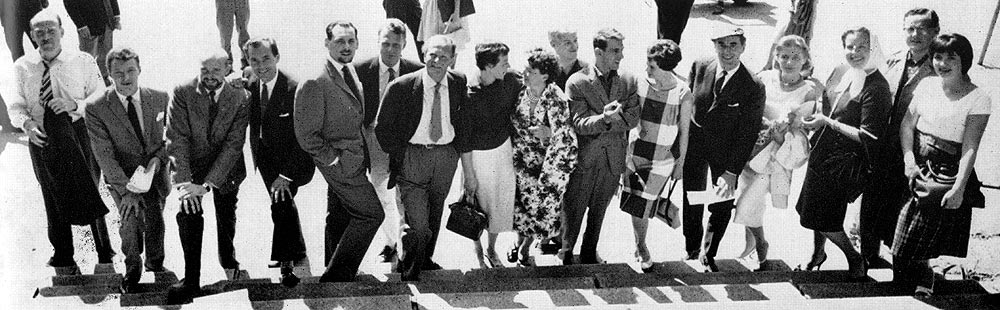
- Abramson (fifth from the left) in 1960
- Born: 5 May 1930; Stockholm, Sweden
- Died: 9 June 2012 (aged 82)
- Occupation: Film director
- Years active: 1957-1991

Hans Abramson (5 May 1930 – 9 June 2012) was a Swedish film director. He directed more than 40 films between 1957 and 1991.

== Selected filmography ==
- Ormen (1966)
- Stimulantia (1967)
- Roseanna (1967)
- Tintomara (1970)
