= Inga Gill =

Swedish actress

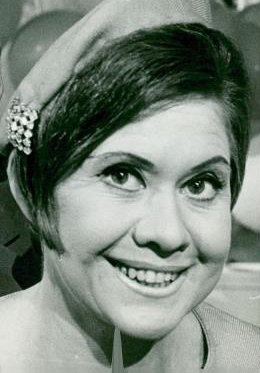
- Gill in 1960s
- Born: 2 May 1925; Stockholm, Sweden
- Died: 18 October 2000 (aged 75); Stockholm, Sweden
- Occupation: Actress
- Years active: 1946–1972

Inga Gill (2 May 1925 – 18 October 2000) was a Swedish actress. She was born in Stockholm and died there in 2000, aged 75, following a thrombosis.

== Selected filmography ==
- Affairs of a Model (1946) - Waitress at Gyldene Tunnan (uncredited)
- Woman Without a Face (1947) - Signe (uncredited)
- Lars Hård (1948) - Maid (uncredited)
- Thirst (1949) - Lady at Hotel (uncredited)
- Miss Julie (1951) - Viola
- We Three Debutantes (1953) - Dancer
- Time of Desire (1954) - Ella
- The Vicious Breed (1954) - Mammie
- Mord, lilla vän (1955) - Mrs. Nygren
- Dreams (1955) - Shop assistant at bakery (uncredited)
- Friarannonsen (1955) - Stina
- Girls Without Rooms (1956) - Agneta
- Seventh Heaven (1956) - Fröken Jonasson, sångtrion Varhulta Sisters
- Sju vackra flickor (1956) - Mr. Rosander's secretary
- Lille Fridolf och jag (1956) - Maggan
- The Seventh Seal (1957) - Lisa, blacksmith's wife
- Johan på Snippen tar hem spelet (1957) - Asta
- Brink of Life (1958) - Mother (uncredited)
- Fridolf Stands Up! (1958) - Maggan Palm
- Enslingen i blåsväder (1959) - Tekla Blomqvist
- Swinging at the Castle (1959) - Mrs. Borg (uncredited)
- Crime in Paradise (1959) - Tobacconist
- Fridolfs farliga ålder (1959) - Maggan Palm
- Sängkammartjuven (1959) - Barwaitress
- The Judge (1960) - Waitress
- The Devil's Eye (1960) - The maid (uncredited)
- Vi fixar allt (1961) - Ms. Bettan Lundgren
- Drömpojken (1964) - Neighbour
- The Cats (1965) - Klara
- Drra på - kul grej på väg till Götet (1967) - Manager
- Cries and Whispers (1972) - Storyteller
- Bröllopet (1973) - Gittan Löfgren
- Raskenstam (1983) - Anna-Greta Kjellgren
- Amorosa (1986) - Miss Tollen
- Min pappa är Tarzan (1986) - Grandma
