= Wanda Rothgardt =

Swedish actress

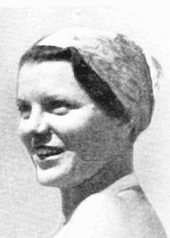
- Born: 12 March 1905; Stockholm, Sweden
- Died: 16 June 1950 (aged 45); Gothenburg, Sweden
- Occupation: Actress
- Years active: 1915–1948 (film)

Wanda Rothgardt (12 March 1905 – 16 June 1950) was a Swedish stage and film actress. Rothgardt was the daughter of the actress Edla Rothgardt. She married the actor Semmy Friedmann with whom she had a daughter Jane Friedmann who also became an actress.

After making her debut as a child actor, she appeared in twenty films. Her final film was Eva (1948).

== Filmography ==
Year	Title	Role	Notes
1915	Hans hustrus förflutna	Barbro (age 7)	
1915	Mästertjuven	Margot	
1916	Kiss of Death		
1919	Sir Arne's Treasure	Berghild	
1920	Bodakungen	Gunnel	
1922	Det omringade huset	Aima	
1923	Eld ombord		
1925	Ett köpmanshus i skärgården	Thorborg Guldbrandsson, hans dotter	
1926	Flickorna på Solvik	Martha Cronsköld	
1927	Sealed Lips	Novice	
1934	Unga hjärtan	Malm's Daughter	Uncredited
1934	Simon of Backabo	Assistant at the Charm Institute	Uncredited
1943	The Word	Inger	
1945	Två människor	Marianne Lundell	
1945	The Gallows Man	Maria	
1946	Kristin Commands	Marianne Westman	
1946	Johansson and Vestman	Helena Bergfors	
1947	How to Love	Monica Lind	
1948	Life Starts Now	Dorrit	
1948	Eva	Mrs. Fredriksson	(final film role)

== Bibliography ==
- Soila, Tytti. The Cinema of Scandinavia. Wallflower Press, 2005.
