= Two Stories Up =

1950 film

- Directed by: Gösta Werner
- Written by: Nils Idström (novel); Ivar Ahlstedt
- Produced by: Inge Ivarson
- Starring: Gertrud Fridh; Bengt Eklund; Irma Christenson
- Cinematography: Sten Dahlgren
- Edited by: Lennart Wallén
- Music by: Willy Mattes
- Production company: Kungsfilm
- Distributed by: Kungsfilm
- Release date: 6 February 1950
- Running time: 98 minutes
- Country: Sweden
- Language: Swedish

Two Stories Up or Across the Yard and Two Flights Up (Swedish: Två trappor över gården) is a 1950 Swedish drama film directed by Gösta Werner and starring Gertrud Fridh, Bengt Eklund and Irma Christenson. It was shot at the Råsunda Studios in Stockholm and on location around the city. The film's sets were designed by the art director Nils Svenwall.

== Synopsis ==
The artist Bengt Hallberg escapes from a mental asylum and heads out to find Inga Larsson, the only person in the world he cares about.

== Cast ==
- Gertrud Fridh as Inga Larsson
- Bengt Eklund as Bengt Hallberg
- Irma Christenson as Tessan
- Sif Ruud as Gunhild
- Elof Ahrle as Konrad
- Åke Fridell as Caretaker
- Björn Berglund as Inga's Father
- Ilse-Nore Tromm as Inga's Mother
- Stig Järrel as Art collector
- Lisskulla Jobs as Deaconess
- Harriet Andersson as Girl in social shelter
- Wiktor Andersson as Johan
- Britta Billsten as Bojan
- Ann Bornholm as Young Inga
- Åke Claesson as Chief Physician
- Julia Cæsar as Julia
- Carl Deurell as Angry old man in basement
- Sven-Eric Gamble as Gunnar
- Göthe Grefbo as Salvation Army Lieutenant
- Nils Hallberg as Knarren
- Magnus Kesster as Police Interrogator
- Sven Lindberg as Doctor
- Arne Lindblad as Peddler
- Ingrid Lothigius as 'Ugglan'
- Gunnar Sjöberg as Reverend
- Tom Walter as Tjocken

== Bibliography ==
- Cowie, Peter Françoise Buquet, Risto Pitkänen & Godfried Talboom. Scandinavian Cinema: A Survey of the Films and Film-makers of Denmark, Finland, Iceland, Norway, and Sweden. Tantivy Press, 1992.
- Larsson, Mariah & Marklund, Anders. Swedish Film: An Introduction and Reader. Nordic Academic Press, 2010.
