= Ticket to Paradise (1962 film) =

1962 film

- Directed by: Arne Mattsson
- Written by: Stig Ahlgren; Kerstin Bernadotte
- Produced by: Sigurd Jørgensen
- Starring: Christina Schollin; Lars Ekborg; Eva Dahlbeck
- Cinematography: Tony Forsberg
- Edited by: Wic Kjellin
- Music by: Harry Arnold
- Production company: Europa Film
- Distributed by: Europa Film
- Release date: 31 March 1962
- Running time: 88 minutes
- Country: Sweden
- Language: Swedish

Ticket to Paradise (Swedish: Biljett till paradiset) is a 1962 Swedish drama film directed by Arne Mattsson and starring Christina Schollin, Lars Ekborg and Eva Dahlbeck. It was shot at the Sundbyberg Studios in Stockholm and on location in Tuscany. The film's sets were designed by the art director Arne Åkermark.

== Cast ==
- Christina Schollin as Pyret Sträng
- Lars Ekborg as Niklas Blom
- Eva Dahlbeck as Rita Carol
- Per Oscarsson as Freddo Rossi
- Stig Järrel as Director Lund
- Sif Ruud as Mrs. Berg
- Sigge Fürst as Torsson
- Ragnar Ulfung as Luigi
- Hjördis Petterson as Mother Rossi
- Yngve Gamlin as Italian Violinist
- Nils Hallberg as Falén
- Eddie Axberg as Piccolon
- Christina Carlwind as Karin
- Mona Geijer-Falkner as Kund i saluhallen
- Sven Magnusson as Interpreter
- Elisabeth Odén as Bibi
- Georg Skarstedt as Kund i saluhallen
- Berndt Westerberg as Receptionschefen
- Birger Åsander as Kund i saluhallen

== Bibliography ==
- Qvist, Per Olov & von Bagh, Peter. Guide to the Cinema of Sweden and Finland. Greenwood Publishing Group, 2000.
