= Gunnel Broström =

Swedish actress (1922–2012)

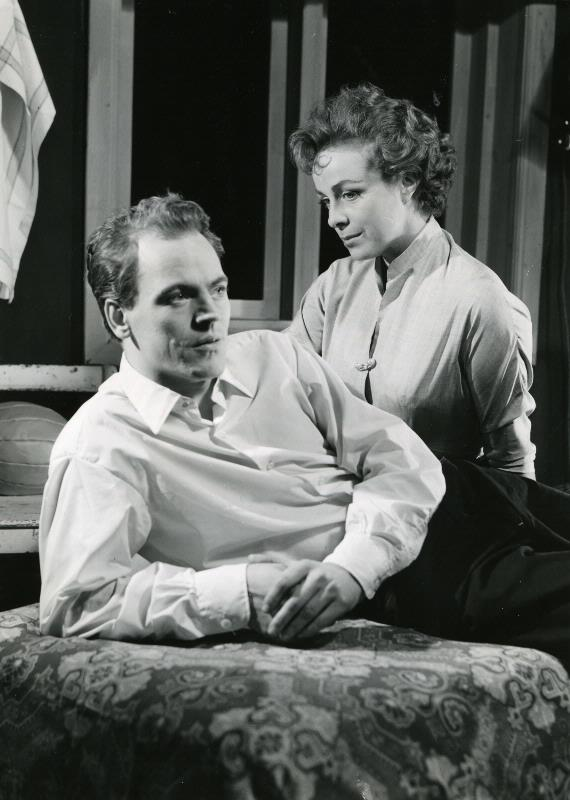
- Broström performing on stage in 1954.
- Born: 25 October 1921; Östermalm, Sweden
- Died: 28 June 2012 (aged 90)
- Occupations: Actress, director
- Years active: 1942–1989 (film & TV)

Gunnel Broström (1922–2012) was a Swedish stage, film and television actress. She also directed a number of television films from 1965 onwards. She was married to the journalist Gustaf Olivecrona. They had two children. She appeared in about 30 films throughout her career; one of her last roles was in Påsk (1988). She died at the age of 90.

== Selected filmography ==
- Ride Tonight! (1942)
- Adventurer (1942)
- Hans majestäts rival (1943)
- Släkten är bäst (1944)
- Skipper Jansson (1944)
- The Gallows Man (1945)
- Peggy on a Spree (1946)
- The Bells of the Old Town (1946)
- Barbacka (1946)
- Rail Workers (1947)
- Crime in the Sun (1947)
- The Swedish Horseman (1949)
- U-Boat 39 (1952)
- We Three Debutantes (1953)
- Storm Over Tjurö (1954)
- Salka Valka (1954)
- Paradise (1955)
- A Doll's House (1956)
- Wild Strawberries (1957)
- A Goat in the Garden (1958)
- Rider in Blue (1959)
- Stimulantia (1967)
- Rooftree (1967)
- Christopher's House (1979)
- Amorosa (1986)

== Bibliography ==
- Steene, Birgitta. Ingmar Bergman: A Reference Guide. Amsterdam University Press, 2005.
- Wright, Rochelle. The Visible Wall: Jews and Other Ethnic Outsiders in Swedish Film. SIU Press, 1998.
