= Life Starts Now (film) =

1948 film

- Directed by: Gustaf Molander
- Written by: Rune Lindström; Gustaf Molander
- Starring: Mai Zetterling; Georg Rydeberg; Wanda Rothgardt
- Cinematography: Åke Dahlqvist
- Edited by: Oscar Rosander
- Music by: Erik Nordgren
- Production company: Svensk Filmindustri
- Distributed by: Svensk Filmindustri
- Release date: 16 August 1948
- Running time: 91 minutes
- Country: Sweden
- Language: Swedish

Life Starts Now (Swedish: Nu börjar livet) is a 1948 Swedish drama film directed by Gustaf Molander and starring Mai Zetterling, Georg Rydeberg and Wanda Rothgardt.

The film's sets were designed by the art director Nils Svenwall.

== Main cast ==
- Mai Zetterling as Vera Ullman
- Georg Rydeberg as Tore Gerhard, vicar
- Wanda Rothgardt as Dorrit
- Hugo Björne as Eliasson
- Bengt Eklund as John Berg
- Åke Grönberg as Berra
- Ivar Kåge as Vicar
- Jan Molander as Svenne
- Sven-Eric Gamble as Plåtis

== Bibliography ==
- Sundholm, John. Historical Dictionary of Scandinavian Cinema. Scarecrow Press, 2012.
