= Love Wins Out =

1949 Swedish film

- Directed by: Gustaf Molander
- Written by: Gustaf Molander; Svend Rindom; Gösta Stevens
- Produced by: Harry Malmstedt
- Starring: Karl-Arne Holmsten; Ingrid Thulin; Ilselil Larsen
- Cinematography: Åke Dahlqvist
- Edited by: Oscar Rosander
- Music by: Erik Nordgren; Eskil Eckert-Lundin
- Production company: Svensk Filmindustri
- Distributed by: Svensk Filmindustri
- Release date: 26 December 1949
- Running time: 104 minutes
- Country: Sweden
- Language: Swedish

Love Wins Out (Swedish: Kärleken segrar) is a 1949 Swedish drama film directed and co-written by Gustaf Molander and starring Karl-Arne Holmsten, Ingrid Thulin and Ilselil Larsen. It was shot at the Råsunda Studios in Stockholm with location shooting taking place around the city at Djursholm and Bromma Airport. The film's sets were designed by the art director Nils Svenwall.

== Cast ==
- Karl-Arne Holmsten as Bertil Burman
- Ingrid Thulin as Margit Dahlman
- Ilselil Larsen as Leni Rosner
- Olof Winnerstrand as Albin Dahlman
- Ester Roeck Hansen as Mrs. Dahlman
- Hans Järrsten as Åke Dahlman
- Sigge Fürst as Erik Berg
- Claus Wiese as Jörgen Solstad
- Anna-Lisa Baude as Greta
- Kolbjörn Knudsen as Hartman
- Sif Ruud as Mrs. Holm
- Birgitta Valberg as Schwester Erika
- Else-Merete Heiberg as Karen Berg
- Solveig Hedengran as Barbro's mother
- Mona Malm as Barbro, girl next door
- John Ekman as Guest at the party
- Sven Holmberg as Guest at the party
- Åke Engfeldt as Friend of Margit
- Maud Hyttenberg as German nurse
- Svea Holm as Prison guard in Ravensbrück
- Torsten Lilliecrona as Prison guard in Ravensbrück
- Nils Ohlin as Host of the party
- Gösta Prüzelius as Red Cross-worker

== Bibliography ==
- Qvist, Per Olov & von Bagh, Peter. Guide to the Cinema of Sweden and Finland. Greenwood Publishing Group, 2000.
