= How to Love (film) =

1947 film

- Directed by: Gunnar Skoglund
- Written by: Gunnar Skoglund
- Starring: Sture Lagerwall; Wanda Rothgardt; Lauritz Falk
- Cinematography: Åke Dahlqvist
- Edited by: Gunnar Skoglund
- Music by: Eskil Eckert-Lundin
- Production company: Svensk Filmindustri
- Distributed by: Svensk Filmindustri
- Release date: 10 February 1947
- Running time: 86 minutes
- Country: Sweden
- Language: Swedish

How to Love (Swedish: Konsten att älska) is a 1947 Swedish drama film directed by Gunnar Skoglund and starring Sture Lagerwall, Wanda Rothgardt and Lauritz Falk. It was shot at the Råsunda Studios in Stockholm. The film's sets were designed by the art director Nils Svenwall.

== Cast ==
- Sture Lagerwall as Pelle Lind
- Wanda Rothgardt as Monica Lind
- Ingegerd Westin as Gudrun
- Sten-Åke Lindström as Lasse
- Björn Montin as Bosse
- Lauritz Falk as Wilhelm Acker
- Cécile Ossbahr as Maja-Vivan Willer
- Elsa Carlsson as Ebba Lindgren von Hacken
- Naima Wifstrand as Vera Stätt
- Agneta Prytz as Ms. Pimpernel
- Marianne Gyllenhammar as Ms. Tillman
- Ilse-Nore Tromm as Anna
- Elsa Ebbesen as Wilhelm Acker's Housekeeper
- Kerstin Holmberg as Mannequin
- Ellika Mann as Mannequin
- Greta Blom as Brita Andersson
- Marie-Louise Martins as Telephone Operator
- Sif Ruud as Lotten
- Ruth Weijden as Lotten's Mother
- Tord Stål as Berglund
- Gunnar Nielsen as Nilsson
- Åke Engfeldt as Tailor
- Rune Stylander as Studio Photographer
- Robert Ryberg as Lundgren
- Arne Lindblad as Maitre D'
- Bo Lindström as Policeman

== Bibliography ==
- Krawc, Alfred. International Directory of Cinematographers, Set- and Costume Designers in Film: Denmark, Finland, Norway, Sweden (from the beginnings to 1984). Saur, 1986.
- Qvist, Per Olov & von Bagh, Peter. Guide to the Cinema of Sweden and Finland. Greenwood Publishing Group, 2000.
