= A Goat in the Garden =

1958 film

- Directed by: Gösta Folke
- Written by: Olle Länsberg
- Based on: A Goat in the Garden by Fritiof Nilsson Piraten
- Starring: Edvin Adolphson; Gunnel Broström; Eva Stiberg
- Cinematography: Åke Dahlqvist
- Edited by: Oscar Rosander
- Music by: Erik Nordgren; Charles Redland
- Production company: Svensk Filmindustri
- Distributed by: Svensk Filmindustri
- Release date: 17 February 1958
- Running time: 101 minutes
- Country: Sweden
- Language: Swedish

A Goat in the Garden (Swedish: Bock i örtagård) is a 1958 Swedish comedy film directed by Gösta Folke and starring Edvin Adolphson, Gunnel Broström and Eva Stiberg. It was based on the 1933 novel of the same title by Fritiof Nilsson Piraten. It was shot at the Råsunda Studios in Stockholm. The film's sets were designed by the art director P.A. Lundgren.

== Cast ==
- Edvin Adolphson as Jon Esping
- Gunnel Broström as Helfrid
- Eva Stiberg as Elisa Zackrisdotter
- Irma Christenson as Mrs. Esping
- Åke Fridell as David Jespersson
- Åke Lindström as Johan Vricklund
- Gunnar Sjöberg as Fabian
- Hugo Björne as Vicar Hagel
- Sten Lindgren as The Bishop
- Per Björkman as Erik the Vesper
- Claes Thelander as The Parson
- Helge Hagerman as Nils Åstrandson
- Stina Ståhle as Vicar's Wife
- Einar Axelsson as Sommerhoff
- Karl Erik Flens as Lille August
- Manne Grünberger as Jeremias
- Agda Helin as Karolina
- John Norrman as Lutterlögn
- Bo Samuelsson as Truls
- Georg Skarstedt as Cpl. Krakow

== Bibliography ==
- Costello, Tom. International Guide to Literature on Film. Bowker-Saur, 1994.
