= Gösta Werner =

Swedish film director (1908–2009)

- Born: 15 May 1908; Östra Wemmenhög, Sweden
- Died: 20 July 2009 (aged 101); Stockholm, Sweden
- Occupations: Film director and screenwriter.
- Spouse: Kaj Björkdahl (m. 1935)

Gösta Werner (15 May 1908 – 20 July 2009) was a Swedish film director. He was married to Kaj Björkdahl. He primarily made his mark on European cinema during the 1940s. During the 1970s, Werner was first associate professor at Stockholm University, and then later Professor of Cinematography. He was born in Östra Wemmenhög, Skåne, Sweden. Werner turned 101 years old on 15 May 2009.

Werner died in Stockholm on 20 July 2009. He was, at the time of his death, the world's oldest film director. He was seven months older than his successor, film director Manoel de Oliveira of Portugal.

== Filmography ==
- 1998 - Spökskepp
- 1995 - Röda fläcken, Den
- 1981 - Victor Sjöström: Ett porträtt
- 1955 - Friarannonsen
- 1953 - Att döda ett barn
- 1952 - Encounter with Life
- 1950 - Two Stories Up
- 1949 - The Street
- 1948 - Loffe the Tramp
- 1948 - Sunshine

=== Writer ===
- 1998 - Spökskepp
- 1938 - Kloka gubben
- 1939 - Svensson ordnar allt!

=== Assistant director ===
- 1931 - Skepparkärlek
- 1931 - Falska millionären
