= Carl-Olov Skeppstedt =

Swedish film editor

- Born: 25 November 1922; Stockholm, Sweden
- Died: 18 September 1996 (aged 73); Stockholm, Sweden
- Occupation: Film editor
- Years active: 1947-1988 (film)

Carl-Olov Skeppstedt (1922–1996) was a Swedish film editor. He edited more than ninety films including three films with Ingmar Bergman.

== Selected filmography ==
- The Poetry of Ådalen (1947)
- Pippi Longstocking (1949)
- The Devil and the Smalander (1949)
- The Realm of the Rye (1950)
- A Ghost on Holiday (1951)
- The Clang of the Pick (1952)
- Kalle Karlsson of Jularbo (1952)
- In Lilac Time (1952)
- For the Sake of My Intemperate Youth (1952)
- Unmarried Mothers (1953)
- Ursula, the Girl from the Finnish Forests (1953)
- Sawdust and Tinsel (1953)
- Dance, My Doll (1953)
- A Night in the Archipelago (1953)
- No Man's Woman (1953)
- Taxi 13 (1954)
- Storm over Tjurö (1954)
- The Yellow Squadron (1954)
- Young Summer (1954)
- The Vicious Breed (1954)
- Far och flyg (1955)
- Dreams (1955)
- Paradise (1955)
- People of the Finnish Forests (1955)
- The Girl in Tails (1956)
- Night Child (1956)
- The Minister of Uddarbo (1957)
- Mother Takes a Vacation (1957)
- A Dreamer's Journey (1957)
- Never in Your Life (1957)
- Fridolf Stands Up! (1958)
- The Phantom Carriage (1958)
- The Wedding Day (1960)
- Good Friends and Faithful Neighbours (1960)
- Adventures of Nils Holgersson (1962)
- Äktenskapsbrottaren (1964)
- Docking the Boat (1965)
- Ön (1966)
- Woman of Darkness (1966)
- Stimulantia (1967)
- The Vicious Circle (1967)
- Language of Love (1969)
- The Lustful Vicar (1970)
- Blushing Charlie (1970)

== Bibliography ==
- Steene, Birgitta. Ingmar Bergman: A Reference Guide. Amsterdam University Press, 2005.
