= Gunnar Nielsen (actor) =

Swedish actor (1919–2009)

- Born: 23 June 1919; Stockholm, Sweden
- Died: 9 January 2009 (aged 89); Sweden
- Occupation: Actor
- Years active: 1942–2000

Gunnar Nielsen (23 June 1919 – 9 January 2009) was a Swedish film actor. He appeared in more than 20 films between 1942 and 2000.

== Selected filmography ==
- My People Are Not Yours (1944)
- A Ship to India (1947)
- How to Love (1947)
- Thirst (1949)
- The Hard Game (1956)
- A Lion in Town (1959)
