= Lars Ekborg =

Swedish actor (1926–1969)

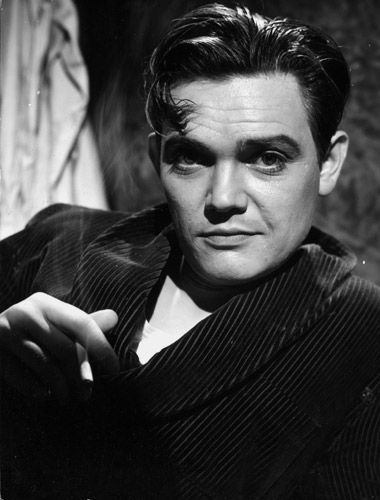
- Born: Lars Åke Rupert Ekborg; 6 June 1926; Uppsala, Sweden
- Died: 7 October 1969 (aged 43); Ängelholm, Sweden
- Occupation: Actor
- Spouse: Lola Sjölund (m. 1951)
- Children: 3, including Anders Ekborg, Dan Ekborg

Lars Åke Rupert Ekborg (6 June 1926 – 7 October 1969) was a Swedish actor, comedian, and singer.

He attended the Royal Dramatic Training Academy in Stockholm.

Ekborg married Lola Sjölund. Two of their children became actors, Dan and Anders Ekborg.

He died of liver cancer in 1969. He may be heard as the recitor in the 1956 recording of Förklädd Gud by Lars-Erik Larsson with Elisabeth Söderström and Erik Saedén, conducted by Stig Westerberg. In 1967, Ekborg made an album called I Tom Lehrers vackra värld ("In the beautiful world of Tom Lehrer"), with 12 of Tom Lehrer's songs translated into Swedish. Lehrer wrote in a letter to the producer Per-Anders Boquist that, "Not knowing any Swedish, I am obviously not equipped to judge, but it sounds to me as though Mr. Ekborg is perfect for the songs", along with further compliments to pianist Leif Asp for unexpected additional flourishes.

== Selected filmography ==
- I Am Fire and Air (1944)
- Don't Give Up (1947)
- Lars Hård (1948)
- Andersson's Kalle (1950)
- Poker (1951)
- U-Boat 39 (1952)
- Encounter with Life (1952)
- The Beat of Wings in the Night (1953)
- Summer with Monika (1953)
- The Vicious Breed (1954)
- Café Lunchrasten (1954)
- Dance in the Smoke (1954)
- The Yellow Squadron (1954)
- The Dance Hall (1955)
- Violence (1955)
- Stage Entrance (1956)
- Night Light (1957)
- No Tomorrow (1957)
- A Guest in His Own House (1957)
- Never in Your Life (1957)
- The Magician (1958)
- Fridolf Stands Up! (1958)
- Sängkammartjuven (1959)
- The Beloved Game (1959)
- Siska (1962)
- Ticket to Paradise (1962)
- The Sword in the Stone (1963) (Swedish voice of Merlin)
- Swedish Wedding Night (1964)
- Docking the Boat (1965)
- Duet for Cannibals (1969)
