= Arne Ragneborn =

Swedish actor

- Born: 13 July 1926; Hammarby, Stockholm, Sweden
- Died: 5 January 1978 (aged 51); Stockholm, Sweden
- Occupations: Actor, film director
- Years active: 1944-1976

Arne Ragneborn (13 July 1926 – 5 January 1978) was a Swedish actor, film director and screenwriter. He appeared in 23 films between 1944 and 1976. Ragneborn starred in the film Leva på 'Hoppet', which won the Silver Bear (Comedies) award at the 1st Berlin International Film Festival.

== Selected filmography ==
- While the City Sleeps (1950)
- Living on 'Hope' (1951)
- Encounter with Life (1952)
- Speed Fever (1953)
- Hidden in the Fog (1953)
- A Night in the Archipelago (1953)
- Café Lunchrasten (1954)
- The Vicious Breed (1954)
- Paradise (1955)
- Girls Without Rooms (1956)
- Never in Your Life (1957)
- Anita: Swedish Nymphet (1973)
