= Jean-Daniel Simon =

French film director (1942–2021)

- Born: 30 November 1942; Salon-de-Provence, Bouches-du-Rhône, France
- Died: 3 February 2021 (aged 78); Paris, France
- Occupations: Film director, screenwriter
- Years active: 1968–1985

Jean-Daniel Simon (30 November 1942 – 3 February 2021) was a French film director, screenwriter and actor. He directed eight films between 1968 and 1985. In 1975 he was a member of the jury at the 9th Moscow International Film Festival.

== Selected filmography ==
- Vice and Virtue (1963)
- Love at Sea (1964)
- Adélaïde (1968)
- Camp de Thiaroye (1988)
