= Göran Gentele =

Swedish actor, director and opera manager

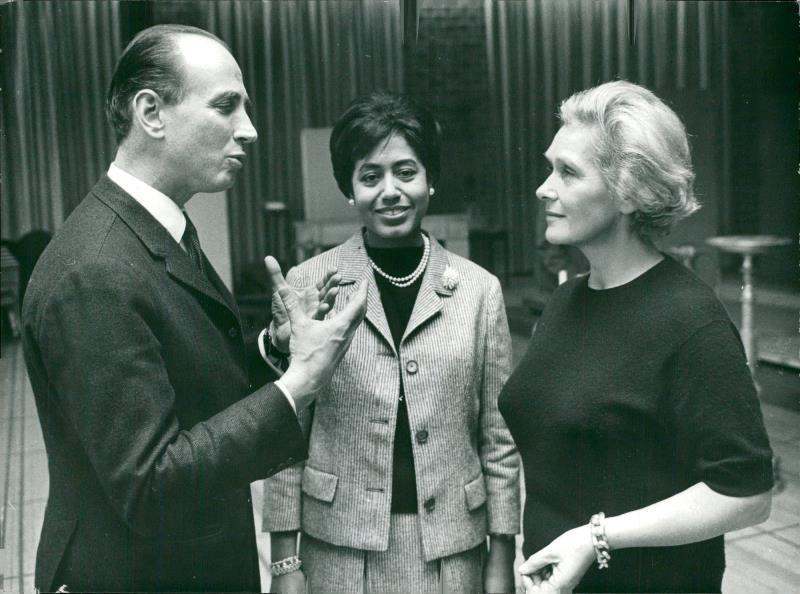
- Gentele (left) with Mattiwilda Dobbs and Elisabeth Schwarzkopf, 1966

General Manager of the Metropolitan Opera
- In office 1972–1972
- Preceded by: Rudolf Bing
- Succeeded by: Schuyler Chapin

Personal details
- Born: 29 September 1917 Stockholm, Sweden
- Died: 18 July 1972 (aged 54) Olbia, Sardegna, Italy
- Occupation: Opera impresario, actor, director

Göran Gentele (29 September 1917 – 18 July 1972) was a Swedish actor, director, and opera manager. He was director of the Royal Swedish Opera from 1963 to 1972 and briefly the general manager of the Metropolitan Opera in New York City in 1972, until his death in a road accident.

== Biography ==
Born in Stockholm, Gentele studied from 1944 until 1946 at the Royal Dramatic Training Academy, beginning a brief career as a film actor not long afterwards. He soon turned to directing, working for a time at the Royal Dramatic Theatre and then at the Royal Swedish Opera, where his more notable productions included Gian Carlo Menotti's The Consul and Karl-Birger Blomdahl's Aniara. He became director of the Royal Swedish Opera in 1963.

He also directed films during approximately the same period (1947 to 1969), making at least 15 feature films and television movies. His 1951 film Leva på 'Hoppet' was awarded the Silver Bear for comedy at the Berlin International Film Festival.

He succeeded Sir Rudolf Bing as director of the Metropolitan Opera in New York City in 1972. Soon after assuming the post, on 18 July 1972, Gentele died in a car crash while on vacation in Sardinia; he was killed along with two of his daughters when the car in which they were riding collided head-on with a truck. A third daughter was injured, as was Gentele's wife, Marit. Schuyler Chapin, Gentele's assistant, was named acting director almost at once.

== Legacy ==
Despite the fact that he had been in office only a few weeks at his death, several of Gentele's plans for the company were implemented under Chapin. The most notable of these was a new production of Georges Bizet's Carmen designed for Marilyn Horne; this was used to open the 1972–1973 season. Gentele was the second general director of the Metropolitan, behind Herbert Witherspoon in 1935, to die before the opening night of his first season as general manager of the company.

== Awards ==
Gentele won the Silver Bear (Comedies) award at the 1st Berlin International Film Festival for his film Leva på 'Hoppet'.

Preceded by Rudolf Bing	General Manager of the Metropolitan Opera; 1972	Succeeded by Schuyler Chapin
