= Stocksund Studios =

Former film studios located in Stockholm

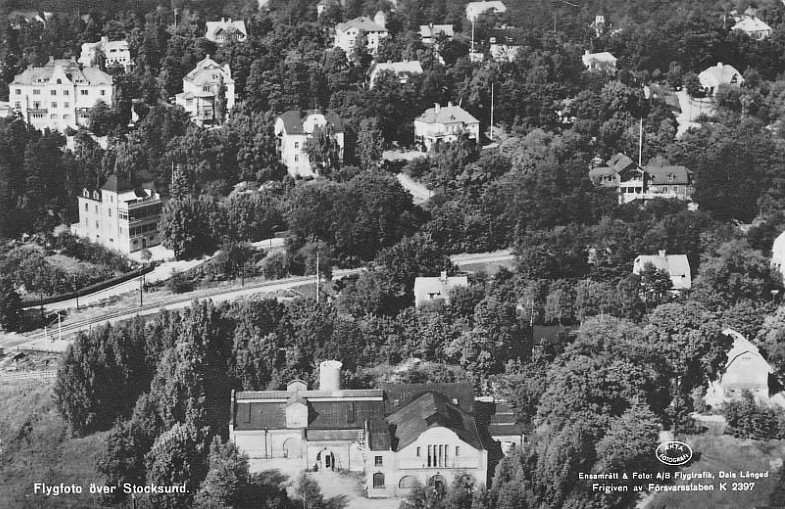
A view of Stocksund in 1949 with the studio site in the foreground.

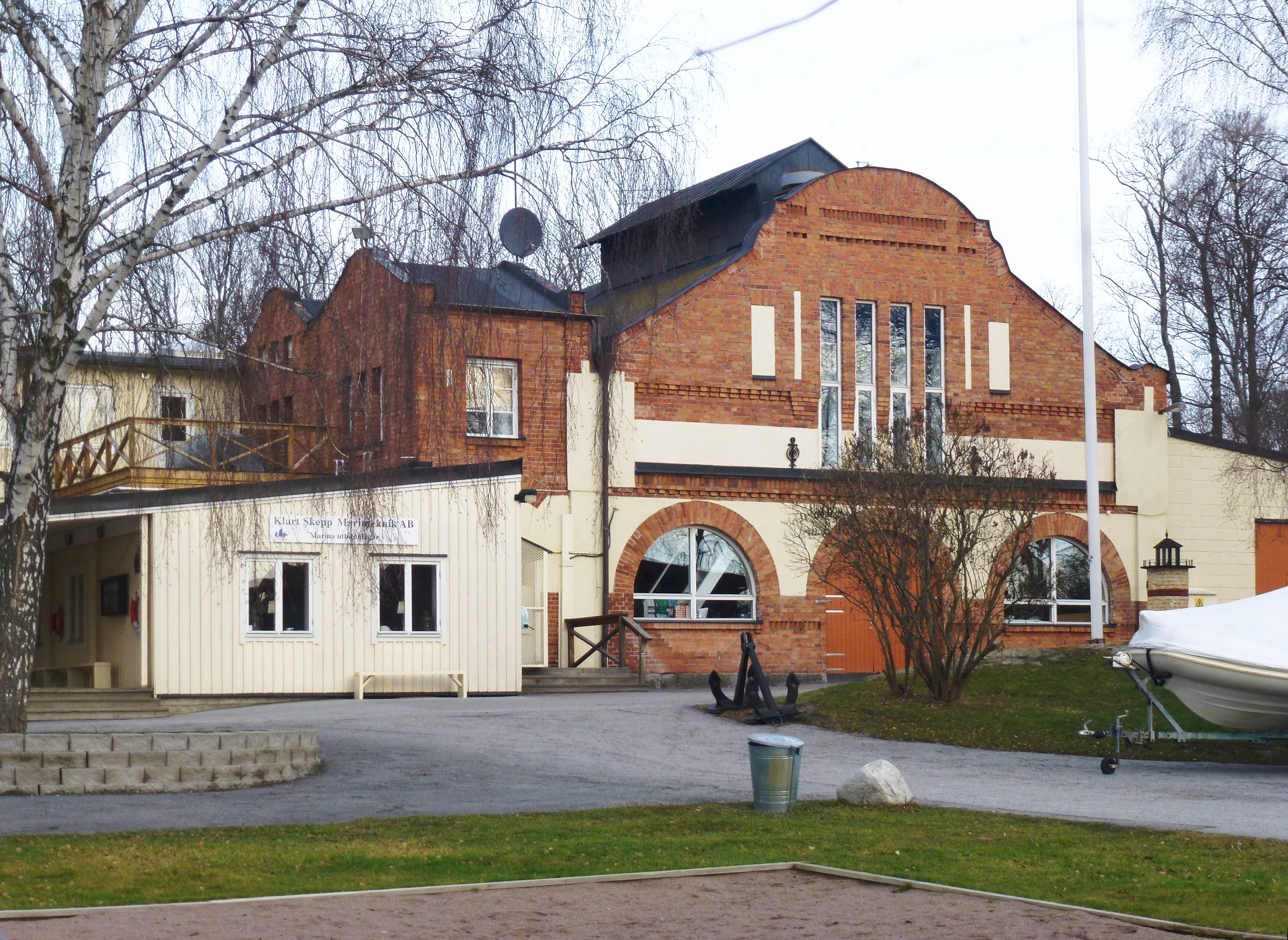
The former Metronome Studios in 2014.

The Stocksund Studios were film production studios located in Stocksund, a suburb of Sweden. Based in a converted former power station, production began there in 1946 by the independent Imago Film company. In 1953 the complex was taken over by Metronome Film and became known as the Metronome Studios, until it was damaged by a fire in 1961. It subsequently passed into the hands of Svensk Filmindustri and from 1964 television productions began shooting there. It was also used for radio by the Swedish Educational Broadcasting Company and music recordings. Today the site houses Marina läroverket, a school.

== Bibliography ==
- Gottesman, Ronald & Geduld, Harry M. Guidebook to Film: An Eleven-in-one Reference. Ardent Media, 1972.
- Paulus, Alfred Schwedische Spielfilmproduktion 1955-1963: Analyse ihrer Voraussetzungen und Tendenzen. G. Narr, 1984.
