= Astrid Bodin =

Swedish actress

- Screen capture of Bodin
- Born: Astrid Linnéa Bodin; 10 July 1903; Österunda, Uppland, Sweden
- Died: 20 October 1961 (aged 58); Stockholm, Stockholm County, Sweden
- Occupation: Actress
- Years active: 1933–61

Astrid Bodin (10 July 1903 – 20 October 1961) was a Swedish actress who appeared in over 120 films. Born on 10 July 1903 in Österunda, Sweden, she began her film-acting career with a small role in 1933's Djurgårdsnätter, starring Erik Berglund and Anne-Marie Brunius. She appeared mostly in smaller roles, many times un-credited. Her final performance was as an unnamed woman in Börje Nyberg's Svenska Floyd (1961), which was released on her 58th birthday, 10 July 1961. She died on 20 October 1961 in the Kungsholms area of Stockholm, Sweden, at the age of 58.

== Filmography ==
(Per Internet Movie Database)

- Flickorna från Gamla sta'n (1933)
- Hon eller ingen (1934)
- Man's Way with Women (1934)
- The Song to Her (1934)
- Close Relations (1935)
- Adventure (1936)
- Conscientious Objector Adolf (1936)
- Our Boy (1936)
- Raggen (1936)
- South of the Highway (1936)
- Med folket för fosterlandet (1937)
- Conflict (1937)
- A Woman's Face (1938)
- Baldwin's Wedding (1938)
- Bashful Anton (1940)
- Everybody at His Station (1940)
- The Three of Us (1940)
- Bright Prospects (1941)
- We're All Errand Boys (1941)
- The Talk of the Town (1941)
- Dunungen (1941)
- Hem från Babylon (1941)
- Landstormens lilla argbigga (1941)
- The Poor Millionaire (1941)
- Sunny Sunberg (1941)
- If I Could Marry the Minister (1941)
- Uppåt igen (1941)
- I brist på bevis (1942)
- Dangerous Ways (1942)
- När ungdomen vaknar (1943)
- Ombyte av tåg (1943)
- Men of the Navy (1943)
- Som du vill ha mej (1943)
- Sonja (1943)
- Stopp! Tänk på något annat (1943)
- Fattiga riddare (1944)
- På farliga vägar (1944)
- Blizzard (1944)
- Wandering with the Moon (1944)
- Rattens musketörer (1945)
- The Journey Away (1945)
- Åsa-Hanna (1946)
- Hotell Kåkbrinken (1946)
- Brita in the Merchant's House (1946)
- Incorrigible (1946)
- Don't Give Up (1947)
- Happy Parades (1947)
- Dynamite (1947)
- I Love You Karlsson (1947)
- Kvarterets olycksfågel (1947)
- The Night Watchman's Wife (1947)
- One Swallow Does Not Make a Summer (1947)
- Two Women (1947)
- The People of Simlang Valley (1947)
- Banketten (1948)
- Cavalliers of the Navy (1948)
- Loffe as a Millionaire (1948)
- On These Shoulders (1948)
- Private Bom (1948)
- Sven Tusan (1948)
- Åsa-Nisse (1949)
- Bohus Battalion (1949)
- Big Lasse of Delsbo (1949)
- Only a Mother (1949)
- Vagabond Blacksmiths (1949)
- Teacher's First Born (1950)
- Girl with Hyacinths (1950)
- To Joy (1950)
- The White Cat (1950)
- Poker (1951)
- A Ghost on Holiday (1951)
- Say It with Flowers (1952)
- For the Sake of My Intemperate Youth (1952)
- Farlig kurva (1952)
- She Came Like the Wind (1952)
- Janne Vängman i farten (1952)
- Kalle Karlsson of Jularbo (1952)
- Summer with Monika (1952)
- The Girl from Backafall (1953)
- The Glass Mountain (1953)
- Sju svarta be-hå (1953)
- Flicka utan namn (1954)
- Dance in the Smoke (1954)
- A Night at Glimmingehus (1954)
- Simon the Sinner (1954)
- Sir Arne's Treasure (1954)
- Storm Over Tjurö (1954)
- The Summer Wind Blows (1954)
- Ung man söker sällskap (1954)
- Blue Sky (1955)
- Whoops! (1955)
- Getting Married (1955)
- The Blonde Witch (1956)
- The Stranger from the Sky (1956)
- Girls Without Rooms (1956)
- Lille Fridolf och jag (1956)
- Rasmus, Pontus and Toker (1956)
- Ratataa eller The Staffan Stolle Story (1956)
- Stage Entrance (1956)
- Seventh Heaven (1956)
- The Biscuit (1956)
- Never in Your Life (1957)
- Enslingen Johannes (1957)
- Far till sol och vå] (1957)
- Mother Takes a Vacation (1957)
- Lille Fridolf blir morfar (1957)
- You Are My Adventure (1957)
- Åsa-Nisse in Military Uniform (1958)
- Enslingen i blåsväder (1958)
- Fridolf Stands Up! (1958)
- The Great Amateur (1958)
- Åsa-Nisse jubilerar (1959)
- Fridolfs farliga ålder (1959)
- Sköna Susanna och gubbarna (1959)
- Swinging at the Castle (1959)
- The Judge (1960)
- Love Mates (1960)
- Åsa-Nisse as a Policeman (1960)
- On a Bench in a Park (1960)
- Tre önskningar (1960)
- Svenska Floyd (1961)
