= Per-Martin Hamberg =

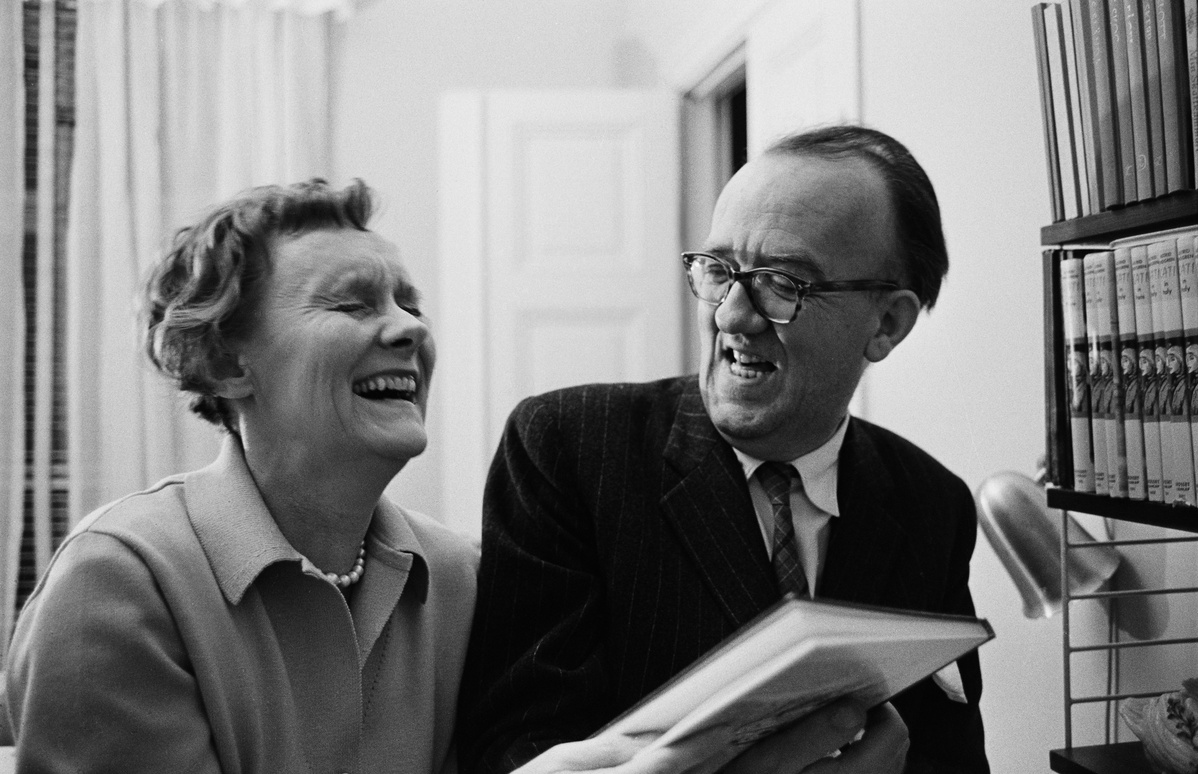
Photograph of the Swedish writers Astrid Lindgren and Per-Martin Hamberg.

Per-Martin Hamberg (born 14 July 1912 in Grundsunda, Sweden,– d. 11. December 1974 in Lidingö, Sweden) was a Swedish composer, scriptwriter, director, author and radio producer.

Per-Martin Hamberg was born in Ångermanland, but, at age 3, came to Stugun in Jämtland County where his father worked as priest. Per-Martin finished High School at Östersund in 1932. Already during his high school years he performed at local city shows with his own melodies. Then he moved to Stockholm, where he passed the exam in Philosophy at Stockholm University in 1939. In high school at Östersund he met Karin Juel, and with her help he was able to publish a number of melodies, including Stora Skrällen and a ballade on the fiddlers of the French king.

Karin Juel often hired Hamberg to be her accompanying pianist. During his first year in Stockholm, Hamberg describes his aspiration for his former hometown Östersund in the known melody „Nu tänds åter ljuse i min lilla stad“ under the pseudonym Erik Decker.

Hamberg was hired by Sveriges Radiotjänst in 1945. Two years later he became head of the entertainment section and reorganized the radio entertainment program. Some of the radio shows which were redefined with Hamberg's help were Föreningen för Flugighetens främjande (FFFF) with Povel Ramel, Frukostklubben with Sigge Fürst, Karusellen with Lennart Hyland, and the long running quiz Tjugo frågor with himself as program director and Astrid Lindgren, Stig Järrel and Kjell Stensson as contributors. In addition to his work at the radio, he led the Knäppupps Revuen from the first show „Akta Huvet“ in Gothenburg from 1952 on. From early on Per-Martin Hamberg was interested in TV as media, and was program head at the Swedish Television from 1955 until 1962, where he started the shows Kvitt eller dubbelt and Stora famnen. He also brought the popular radio show Hylands hörna to TV. During his last years at the Swedish Television he worked at the news departement and as the head of Aktuell. Per-Martin was multitalented, and published his first book Kärleks ljuva plåga shortly before his death, a novel about Magdalena Rudensköld. In 1962 Per-Martin donated to the Uppsala history museum a valuable copy of trapping scissors which were made at the end of the 18th century to catch the great sea monster Storsjöodjuret. These were exchanged against the original during the 1965 festival; that's why the original trapping scissors are now in Uppsala and the copy is in Östersund.

Per-Martin Hamberg's nephew Lars Hamberg, at his time the most known radio host at the Swedish Radio in Malmö, founded the orchestra Phontrattarne in Uppsala in 1956.

Per-Martin was married with Anna Maria Elisabeth Hamberg (1911–2000).

== Film music ==
- 1944 Sabotage
- 1946 Kvinnor i väntrum (women in the waiting room)
- 1947 Kvarterets olycksfågel (the unlucky fellow of the neighborhood)
- 1948 Textilarna (textiles)
- 1949 Pippi Långstrump (Pippi Longstocking)
- 1950 Knockout at the Breakfast Club (crashing of the stars in the breakfast club)
- 1950 Mamma gör revolution (mum makes revolution)
- 1951 A Ghost on Holiday
