= Charlie Norman =

Swedish musician and entertainer

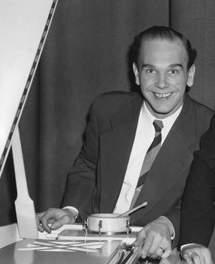
- Charlie Norman in 1954

Background information
- Born: Karl-Erik Albert Norman; 4 October 1920; Ludvika, Sweden
- Died: 12 August 2005 (aged 84) Danderyd, Sweden
- Genres: Jazz, boogie-woogie
- Occupation: Musician
- Instrument: Piano
- Website: charlienorman.se

Karl-Erik Albert "Charlie" Norman (4 October 1920 – 12 August 2005) was a Swedish musician and entertainer. Norman is regarded as Sweden's leading boogie-woogie piano player in the 1940s, but an accomplished all-round pianist.

He collaborated with other artists such as Alice Babs and Sickan Carlsson. He wrote scores for a number of films and also starred as an actor in several. His boogie-woogie version of Edvard Grieg's Anitra's Dance earned him some notoriety in Norway.

== Early life ==
Born in Ludvika, central Sweden, Norman became interested in music at an early age and played the trumpet in his school orchestra. At the time, he was also studying the piano. Norman's parents did not want him to take up a career as a musician without first learning, what they considered, a more a proper trade. After leaving school, he worked as a turner at the ASEA workshops in Ludvika. In his spare time he started a dance orchestra where he played the piano. His dance orchestra entered a competition in Borlänge in 1937. Norman's prowess as a pianist was recognized and he was invited to join the Sven Fors Orchestra.

Norman got his first professional job as a musician in the summer of 1937, with the Sven Fors Orchestra at the Societetsrestaurangen ("High Society Restaurant") in Varberg. He made his radio debut in 1938. After that, he worked with orchestra leaders such as Håkan von Eichwald and Seymour Österwall. In 1942, Norman contracted tuberculosis and had to be hospitalized for an extended period of time. While in hospital, Norman began to write arrangements for recording sessions and also prepared a correspondence course in arrangement for dance orchestras.

In 1949, he married Dagny Knutsson. They had a son Lennie and a daughter Lena.

== Career ==
At the beginning of 1940, Norman was already a skilled boogie-woogie pianist and this musical genre became the most popular of his compositions and it also became his signature. The boogie-woogie style he played in was a success when his first record, Charlies Boogie, was released in 1941.

When Norman re-arranged Edvard Grieg's classical "Anitras Dance" and renamed it "Anitras Dance Boogie" in 1949, it resulted in a major controversy. The Grieg Foundation in Norway were outraged and said that the performance "violated Grieg's artistic copyright" and his record company, Metronome, was forced to withdraw the remaining copies. By then the record had already sold in excess of 10,000 copies and the "Anitras Dance Boogie" became one of the most requested pieces in Norman's repertoire.

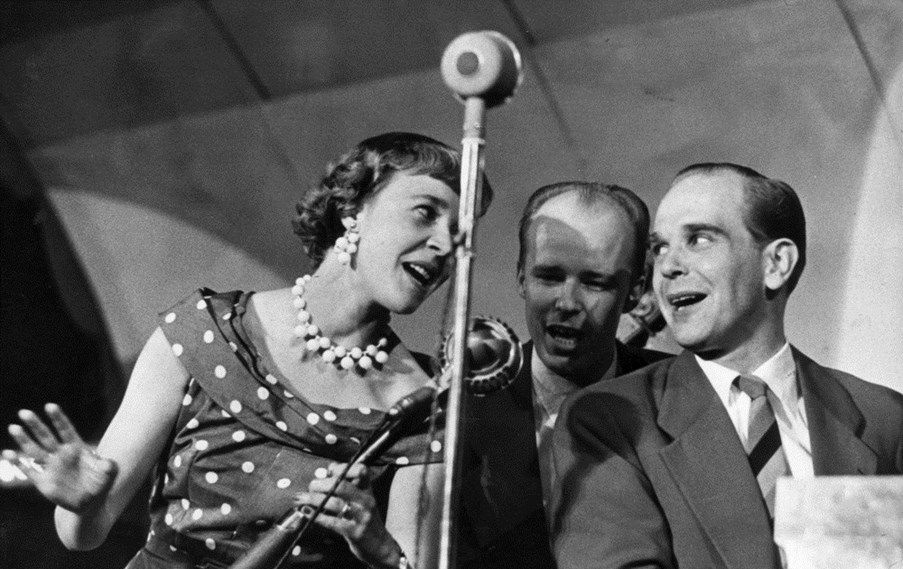
Charlie Norman at the piano with Alice Babs and guitarist Roffe Berg in Sikforsen, 19 August 1954.

During the 1940s, Norman made several appearances abroad, including his television debut in Paris in 1947, on a program that also featured the legendary Édith Piaf. In 1949, Norman put together an orchestra to entertain US military personnel at the officer's club in Frankfurt. Starting in 1950, Norman reached a larger audience through his radio shows. He hosted the radio series the Nattugglan (The Night Owl) followed by The Charlie Norman Show and Charlie in School. In 1951, Norman formed a trio with Rolf Berg and Hasse Burman that toured and performed at a number of venues.

Norman made many recordings with Swedish singer Alice Babs and one of these resulted in Sweden's first gold record. His collaboration with Babs became successful and lasted for years. In 1990, Norman successfully persuaded her to make a comeback after her lengthy retirement to Spain. Norman was one of the artists in the popular radio program Dagens Revy (Today's Revue) along with Gösta Bernhard, Sickan Carlsson and Stig Järrel. In television, Norman contributed to children's programs and the family program Small Town. He wrote many film scores, for both short films and full-length features such as The Pot Travel, You've made your bed... and Dangerous Freedom. He also wrote the score for the American television series, Foreign Intrigue of which 50 episodes were shown in Sweden.

In addition to being a skilled pianist, Norman also had an excellent sense of humour and he has often been compared to Victor Borge. He wrote most of the material he used in shows. During the 1970s and 1980s Norman teamed up with his son, comedian Lennie Norman, and Ronnie Gardiner for ten winter seasons on the Canary Islands where they entertained Swedish tourists. Norman also appeared in restaurant shows at the Berns and Bacchi Wapen restaurants in Stockholm, the restaurant Trädgårn in Gothenburg and Kronprinsen in Malmö. In the 1990s, Norman often played with Robert Wells, a great admirer of Norman's.

== Death ==
Norman died on 12 August 2005, in Danderyd, Sweden from skeletal cancer.

== Awards ==
- SKAP stipend, 1966
- Fred Winter stipend, 1993
- Lisebergsapplåden, 1997
- Grammis Honorary Award, 1997
- H. M. The King's Medal, 8th size with blue ribbon, 28 January 1998

== Discography ==
- 1941 – Charlies Boogie
- 1959 – Trudy (EP, Norway) (as "Charlie Norman Quartet")
- 1965 – Charlie Norman Show
- 1968 – Charlie Norman Show på Berns – Banne mej!
- 1970 – Charlie...
- 1973 – Garner och hemvävt
- 1975 – Charlie live
- 1976 – En glad X-Mas
- 1979 – The Boogie Woogie Touch
- 1980 – Charlie Norman går på party
- 1980 – Charlie Norman hyllar Fats Waller
- 1981 – Sophisticated Lady
- 1988 – Charlie Norman Trio
- 1991 – Charlie Norman Vs Robert Wells
- 1993 – Papa Piano
- 1998 – Swingtime Again
- 2001 – 1 timme, 12 minuter & 24 sekunder
- 2003 – En salig röra

== Filmography ==
Films Norman participated in:

=== Composer ===
- 1948 – Kvinnan gör mig galen
- 1950 – The Saucepan Journey
- 1951 – A Ghost on Holiday
- 1952 – Han glömde henne aldrig
- 1952 – The Green Lift
- 1952 – Farlig kurva
- 1952 – Sabotage
- 1953 – Arbetets melodi
- 1954 – The Vicious Breed
- 1955 – The Dance Hall
- 1956 – Foreign Intrigue
- 1957 – Som man bäddar...

=== Actor ===
- 1941 – Söderpojkar
- 1941 – Gatans serenad
- 1941 – Bara en kvinna
- 1949 – Kvinnan som försvann
- 1950 – Toner från Texas
- 1952 – Skivscheiken Nr 1
- 1952 – Drömsemester
- 1953 – Skivscheiken Nr 2
- 1953 – Kungen av Dalarna
- 1953 – Arbetets melodi
- 1954 – 1900 – till idag
- 1955 – Släck av!
- 1956 – Johan på Snippen
- 1964 – Tre dar på luffen

== Bibliography ==
- Musikant med brutet gehör ("Musician with broken pitch") (memoirs), 1980 ISBN 91-582-0230-7
