= Gösta Bernhard =

Swedish actor

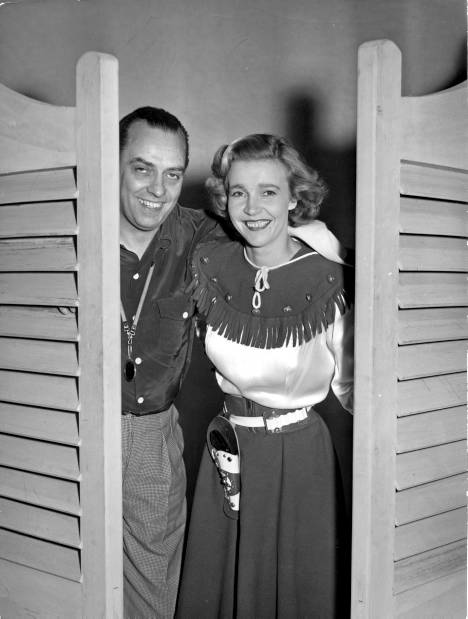
- Gösta Bernhard (left) and Alice Babs, 1952
- Born: Karl Gösta Bernhard Nilsson; 26 September 1910; Västervik, Sweden
- Died: 4 January 1986 (aged 75); Stockholm, Sweden
- Occupations: Actor, film director, screenwriter
- Years active: 1936–1975
- Spouses: Dagny Glans (m. 1940–1946) Iréne Söderblom (m. 1947–1970)

Gösta Bernhard (26 September 1910 – 4 January 1986) was a Swedish actor, film director and screenwriter. He appeared in more than 30 films between 1936 and 1975. He also directed 17 films between 1947 and 1975. He was born in Västervik, Kalmar County, Sweden and died in Stockholm, Sweden.

== Biography ==
At a young age, Gösta Bernhard was called "Västervik's Karl Gerhard", comparing him to the famous revue actor. Bernhard was a skilled lyricist and came to be responsible for a number of revues. In 1930 he moved to Stockholm. As early as 1933, he met Stig Bergendorff and the two began a collaboration, first with Bellevue-Fredhällsrevyn, which was run by two sports clubs, then under joint auspices with the so-called crazy revues in 1941–1963 at the now demolished Casinoteatern at Bryggargatan in Stockholm. At the Casino Revue they also featured the revue group Tre Knas 1946 (Carl-Gustaf Lindstedt, Gunnar "Knas" Lindkvist and Nils Ohlson, the latter replaced by Curt "Minimal" Åström), and the comedian couple "Gus & Holger", (Gus Dahlström and Holger Höglund). Iréne Söderblom, Kai Gullmar, John Elfström, Arne Källerud and Carl-Axel Elfving also occasionally appeared in the revue. The revue also toured in the national parks in 1944, 1950 and 1955–1961. During the years 1973–1980, the Casino revues experienced a renaissance on Intiman, later called Wallman's Intiman, on Odengatan in Stockholm with several of the old actors, Gus Dahlström, Gunnar ”Knas" Lindkvist, Carl-Gustaf Lindstedt and Gösta Krantz, often flanked by Siv Ericks, Eva Bysing or Anna Sundqvist. Actress Mille Schmidt also joined the gang. The final year, the Casino Revue also toured in the national parks.

Bernhard was also active at Lisebergsteatern in Gothenburg, where he played comedies during the summer, such as The rocking chair, Privatkiv and The happy apple. He toured with the National Swedish Touring Theatre several seasons where he did the title role in Jeppe on the Hill and the milkman Tevje in Fiddler on the roof. The latter role had first Frank Sundström engaged him to play at Stockholm City Theatre, 1969.

=== Personal life ===
Gösta Bernhard was the son of Anna Elisabeth Nilsson who ran a bakery in Västervik. He was married in 1940–1946 to Dagny Byhmar, born Glans (1913–1997) and 1947–1970 to the actress Iréne Söderblom (born 1921), with whom he had a daughter, Lillemor, born in 1948.

== Selected filmography ==
=== Director ===
- Private Karlsson on Leave (1947)
- Loffe as a Millionaire (1948)
- Knockout at the Breakfast Club (1950)
- Poker (1951)
- A Ghost on Holiday (1951)
- Drömsemester (1952)
- Sju svarta be-hå (1954)
- Far och flyg (1955)

=== Actor ===
- The Family Secret (1936)
- Time of Desire (1954)
- Paradise (1955)
- More Than a Match for the Navy (1958)
- Woman of Darkness (1966)
