= Drömsemester =

1952 film

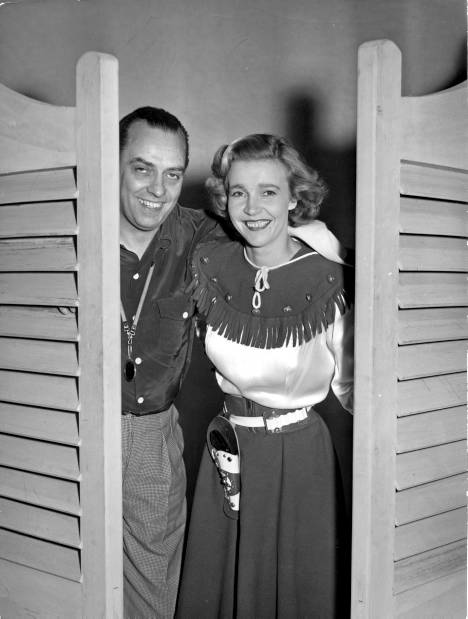
- Alice Babs and director Gösta Bernhard during the filming
- Directed by: Gösta Bernhard
- Written by: Eric Sandström
- Starring: Dirch Passer
- Cinematography: Hilmer Ekdahl
- Edited by: Wic Kjellin
- Release date: 3 October 1952
- Running time: 86 minutes
- Country: Sweden
- Language: Swedish

Drömsemester is a 1952 Swedish comedy film directed by Gösta Bernhard and starring Dirch Passer. The 86-minute film follows a Danish school teacher who is on a holiday through Sweden in a crumbling T-Ford.

== Cast ==
- Dirch Passer - Mogens Jensen
- Stig Järrel - Porter / Police / Newspaper editor / Landlady / Customs officer / Gipsy / Gentleman
- Alice Babs - Alice Babs
- Svend Asmussen
- Staffan Broms
- Traverse Crawford - The Delta Rhythm Boys
- Rene DeKnight - The Delta Rhythm Boys
- Lee Gaines - The Delta Rhythm Boys
- Clifford Holland - The Delta Rhythm Boys
- Sigrid Horne-Rasmussen - Lady (in "En bröllopsnatt")
- Carl Jones - The Delta Rhythm Boys
- Uno Larsson - Cowboy at Vilda Västernsaloon
- John Melin - Scen guard
- Sten Meurk - Bride (in "En bröllopsnatt")
- Ulrik Neumann - Variety show artist
- Charlie Norman
- Nils Ivar Sjöblom - Alice Babs' husband
- Karin Appelberg-Sandberg - Whipping carpet woman (uncredited)
- Per-Axel Arosenius - Policeman (uncredited)
- Gösta Bernhard - Porter / Film director (uncredited)
- Simon Brehm - Cossack (uncredited)
- Anders Burman - Cowboy at Vilda Västernsaloon (uncredited)
- Lars Burman - Cowboy at Vilda Västernsaloon (uncredited)
- Monica Lindman - Prostitute (uncredited)
- Inge Østergaard - Victim of custom controller (uncredited)
