= Morgan Andersson =

Swedish actor (1934–1977)

- Born: Sven Morgan Andersson; 23 February 1934; Lundby, Gothenburg, Sweden
- Died: 4 July 1977 (aged 43); Stockholm, Sweden
- Occupation: Actor

Sven Morgan Andersson (23 February 1934 – 4 July 1977) was a Swedish actor. He was born, in Lundby, Gothenburg, and died in Stockholm.

== Filmography ==
List of acting performances in film and television
Title	Year	Role	Notes
Picknick på slagfältet	1967	Red Cross man	TV movie
Drottningens juvelsmycke	1967	von Essen	TV mini-series; segments 1 and 3
Fadren	1967	Nöjd	TV movie
Operation Argus	1966	Police Officer	TV mini-series, episodes: "Spionnästet Frösvik"; "Uppgörelsen"; "Jakten på ambulansen"; "Kontraspionen"; "Radiotelegrafist dubbelspion"
Tartuffe	1966	The guard officer	TV movie
Farfar till häst	1966		TV movie
Woyzeck	1966	2:e gesällen	TV movie
Ormen	1966	Åke	
Asmodeus	1966	Harry Fanning	TV movie
Sten Stensson Returns	1963	Monsieur	
Dear John	1964		
Raggargänget	1962	Svenne	as Sven Morgan Andersson
Åsa-Nisse på Mallorca	1962	Anders, burglar	uncredited
På en bänk i en park	1960	Thief at Centralen	uncredited
