= Ingrid Backlin =

Swedish actress (1920–2013)

- Born: 16 May 1920; Stockholm, Sweden
- Died: 24 February 2013 (aged 92); Sweden
- Occupation: Actress
- Years active: 1940-1983

Ingrid Backlin (née Michaelsson) (born 16 May 1920 in Stockholm, died 24 February 2013) was a Swedish actress. Backlin made her film acting debut in 1940 in Snurriga familjen by Ivar Johansson, and would later participate in more than 30 films. She was married to actor Stig Järrel, and is the mother of former Member of Parliament Henrik S. Järrel and Helen Åberg.

== Selected filmography ==
- Adventurer (1942)
- The Case of Ingegerd Bremssen (1942)
- Life in the Country (1943)
- Widower Jarl (1945)
- Incorrigible (1946)
- The Sixth Commandment (1947)
- Poker (1951)
- A Ghost on Holiday (1951)
- In Lilac Time (1952)
- Kalle Karlsson of Jularbo (1952)
- Night Child (1956)
- Siska (1962)
- Nightmare (1965)
