= Svea Holst =

Swedish actress (1901–1996)

- Born: 20 April 1901
- Died: 28 April 1996 (aged 95); Stockholm, Sweden
- Occupation: Actress
- Years active: 1923–1987

Svea Holst (20 April 1901 – 28 April 1996) was a Swedish film actress. She appeared in more than 50 films between 1923 and 1987.

== Selected filmography ==
- Nothing But the Truth (1939)
- Kristin Commands (1946)
- Crisis (1946)
- A Ship to India (1947)
- Rail Workers (1947)
- Music in Darkness (1948)
- Son of the Sea (1949)
- The Street (1949)
- Pimpernel Svensson (1950)
- The Saucepan Journey (1950)
- U-Boat 39 (1952)
- The Clang of the Pick (1952)
- The Road to Klockrike (1953)
- Ursula, the Girl from the Finnish Forests (1953)
- Café Lunchrasten (1954)
- Simon the Sinner (1954)
- Storm Over Tjurö (1954)
- Taxi 13 (1954)
- The Light from Lund (1955)
- The Unicorn (1955)
- The Biscuit (1956)
- More Than a Match for the Navy (1958)
- A Lion in Town (1959)
- On a Bench in a Park (1960)
- Sten Stensson Returns (1963)
- The Passion of Anna (1969)
- Elvis! Elvis! (1976)
- Rasmus på luffen (1981)
- Sally and Freedom (1981)
- Fanny and Alexander (1982)
- Två killar och en tjej (1983)
