= Knockout at the Breakfast Club =

1950 film

- Directed by: Gösta Bernhard
- Written by: Gösta Bernhard
- Produced by: Ragnar Brandhild
- Starring: Sigge Fürst; Åke Söderblom; Irene Söderblom
- Cinematography: Göran Strindberg
- Edited by: Lennart Wallén
- Music by: Per-Martin Hamberg
- Production company: Sandrews
- Distributed by: Sandrew-Baumanfilm
- Release date: 5 August 1950
- Running time: 87 minutes
- Country: Sweden
- Language: Swedish

Knockout at the Breakfast Club (Swedish: Stjärnsmäll i Frukostklubben) is a 1950 Swedish comedy film directed by Gösta Bernhard and starring Sigge Fürst, Åke Söderblom and Irene Söderblom. It was shot at the Centrumateljéerna Studios in Stockholm. The film's sets were designed by the art director Bibi Lindström. It was based on a popular radio series.

== Synopsis ==
A young screenwriter is trying to sell a script about a crime film to a director, but a series of mix-ups ensue including the involvement of an irate ex-boxer who jealously believes his wife is having an affair.

== Cast ==
- Sigge Fürst as Sigge Fürst
- Åke Söderblom as 'Trollet' Svensson
- Sven Lindberg as Gunnar
- Douglas Håge as Dir. Toning
- Irene Söderblom as Greta
- Gus Dahlström as Gus
- Holger Höglund as Holger
- Marianne Löfgren as Tilda
- Arne Källerud as Bergström
- Nils Olsson as Fix I
- Carl-Gustaf Lindstedt as Fix II
- Gunnar 'Knas' Lindkvist as Fix III
- Georg Adelly as Jojje
- Inga Hodell as Gullan
- Sven Arefeldt as Sven
- Andrew Walter as Dragspelare
- Curt Randelli as Kaffepetter
- Harriet Andersson as En flicka
- Frithiof Bjärne as Lejon
- Ingrid Björk as Medlem av revybaletten
- Carl-Axel Elfving as Skulptör
- Siegfried Fischer as Efraim Larsson
- Gita Gordeladze as Sekreterare
- Haide Göransson as Vårflicka
- Agda Helin as Fru Pettersson
- Mary Hjelte as Axelssons syster
- Sven Holmberg as Larsson
- Marianne Ljunggren as Medlem av revybaletten
- John Melin as Viktor
- Ingrid Olsson as Medlem av revybaletten
- Ulla-Carin Rydén as Medlem av revybaletten
- Maj-Britt Thörn as Medlem av revybaletten
- Brita Ulfberg as Telefonist
- Gunnel Wadner as Medlem av revybaletten
- Alf Östlund as Axelsson

== Bibliography ==
- Qvist, Per Olov & von Bagh, Peter. Guide to the Cinema of Sweden and Finland. Greenwood Publishing Group, 2000.
- Segrave, Kerry & Martin, Linda. The Continental Actress: European Film Stars of the Postwar Era--biographies, Criticism, Filmographies, Bibliographies. McFarland, 1990.
