= Gabriel Jönsson =

Swedish author and poet (1892–1984)

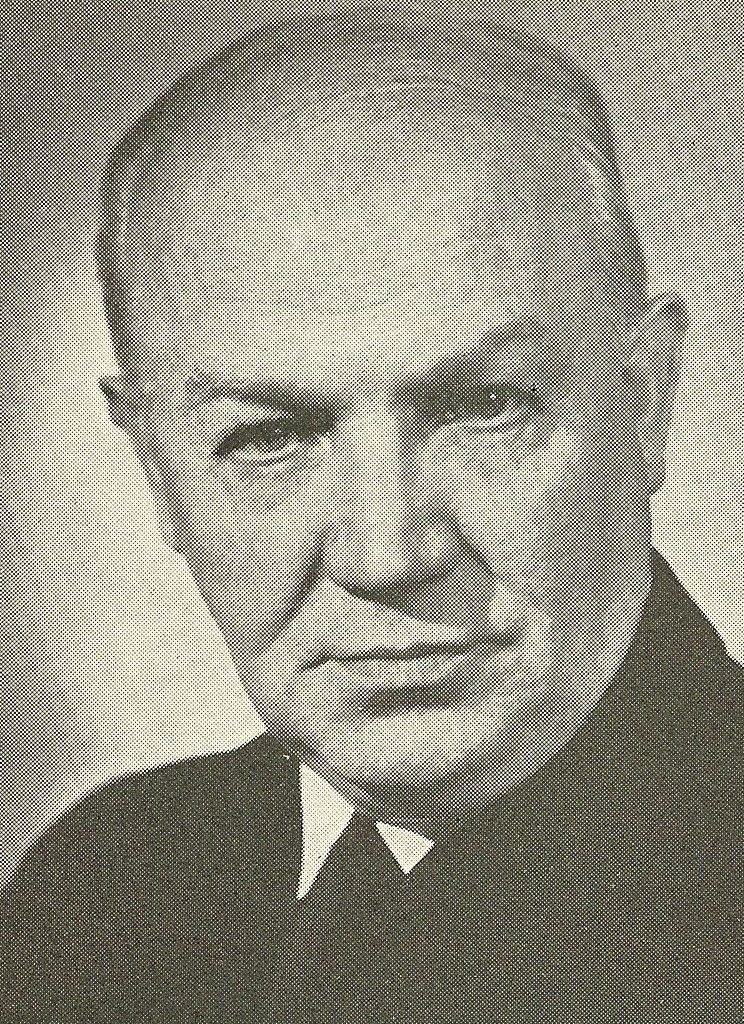
- Born: 18 July 1892; Ålabodarna, Glumslöv, Sweden
- Died: 23 April 1984 (aged 91); Ålabodarna, Glumslöv, Sweden
- Education: Helsingborgs högre allmänna läroverk, Lund University, studies never completed
- Occupation: Journalist/poet
- Employer(s): Svenska Dagbladet, Sydsvenska Dagbladet
- Known for: Poems about the sea and farming
- Spouse: Anna-Margareta (Annika)

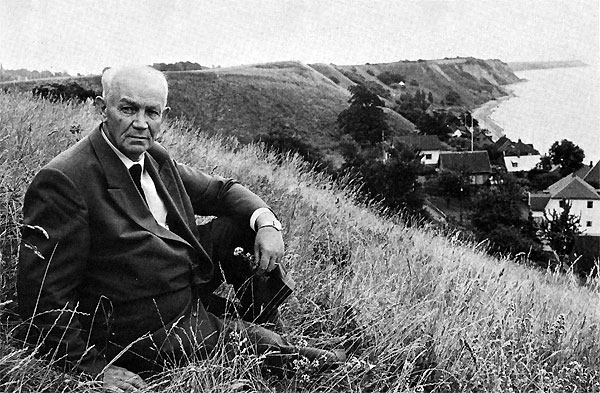
Gabriel Jonsson in 1967

Gabriel Jönsson (18 July 1892 – 23 April 1984) was a Swedish author and poet. He is best known for his works inspired by Öresund and farming. He was one of the first members of the Scanian Academy in Sweden.

== Early life ==
Jönsson was born into a Baptist family. His father, Peter, was a seaman, but due to back injuries caused by carrying bricks, he started a trading post in Ålabodarna, and later on the island Ven, Husvik. Jönsson's mother was hired to work at the Husvik store and later married Jönsson's father. Peter Jönsson died in 1901, when Jönsson was 7. At that time he had two brothers and one sister.

Jönsson’s wish was to become a seaman like his father, but his mother, a businesswoman, wanted him to be educated. She paid for her three sons' education. Jönsson studied first in Helsingborg, at the Högre Allmänna Läroverket "Higher Public Learning Institute" and later at Lund University, although he did not graduate.

== Career ==
He was a journalist at Svenska Dagbladet, Stockholms-Tidningen and Sydsvenska Dagbladet. He wrote many poems from 1920 until 1991. He also wrote two screenplays, Country life and The Girl from Backafall. He received multiple prizes, including The Nine Grand Prix, Sydsvenska Dagbladet's culture prize, Rural Writers' Scholarship and Skane of the year. In 2013 he received a memorial stone on Landskrona's Walk of Fame, inaugurated by King of Sweden Carl XVI Gustaf.

=== "The Girl from Backafall" ("Flickan från Backafall") ===
The poem "Vid Vakten" (At the helm) from the book Flaskpost "Message in a bottle" (1920) was turned into a popular song in Sweden "Flickan från Backafall" (The girl from Backafall) by Gunnar Turesson and is today a signature song of the island Ven, where Backafall is located. Backafall translated to English means "falling slope" and is a reference to the area between the white church on the island of Ven's west side and small harbor of the same name below.

The song describes a young seaman in the Caribbean on a long voyage, longing for his girlfriend waiting for him at home.

== Published works ==
- 1920 Flaskpost (Message in a bottle)
- 1927 Årsringar (Year rings)
- 1935 Skånska somrar, Bonniers (Scanian Summers)
- 1936 Mina skepp (My ships)
- 1941 Kustland (Coastland)
- 1944 Skånehistorier (Scanian stories)
- 1946 Himmel och blandsäd (Heaven and wheet)
- 1948 Diktens Skåne (Poetry of Scania)
- 1952 Dikter (Poetry)
- 1954 Än sjunger Öresund (The Sound is still singing)
- 1956 Min strand (My beach)
- 1964 Skåne i kameraögat (Scania in the camera eye)
- 1975 Minnen från kustlandet och betland (Memories from coastland and sugarbetland)
- 1978 Ung mellan backar och böljor, Bernces (Young between hills and vawes) ISBN 91-500-0370-4
- 1980 Porträtt och Poesier, Bernces (Portretts and Poetry) ISBN 91-500-0377-1
- 1991 Fotboll är också poesi, Förlagsband Förlaga Viken (Soccer is also poetry)

== Prizes and awards ==
- 1954 De Nios Stora Pris (The Nine Society's Big Price)
- 1956 Sydsvenska Dagbladets Kulturpris (The South Swedish Daily Newspaper's Price of Culture)
- 1971 Landsbygdens författarstipendium (Rural author scholarship)
- 1977 Årets skåning (Scanian of the year)
- 2013 He got a memorial stone on Landskronas Walk of Fame which was inaugurated by the Swedish king Carl XVI Gustaf.

== Family ==
Jönsson was married to Anna-Margareta, called "Annika" (1903-1991). They are buried together at Glumslöv's cemetery.

== Sources ==
1. Karin Karlsson (1977) Bernces, Malmö, Sångaren vid Öresund "The singer by the Sound", ISBN 978-91-500-0309-3
