= Marianne Aminoff =

Swedish actress (1916–1984)

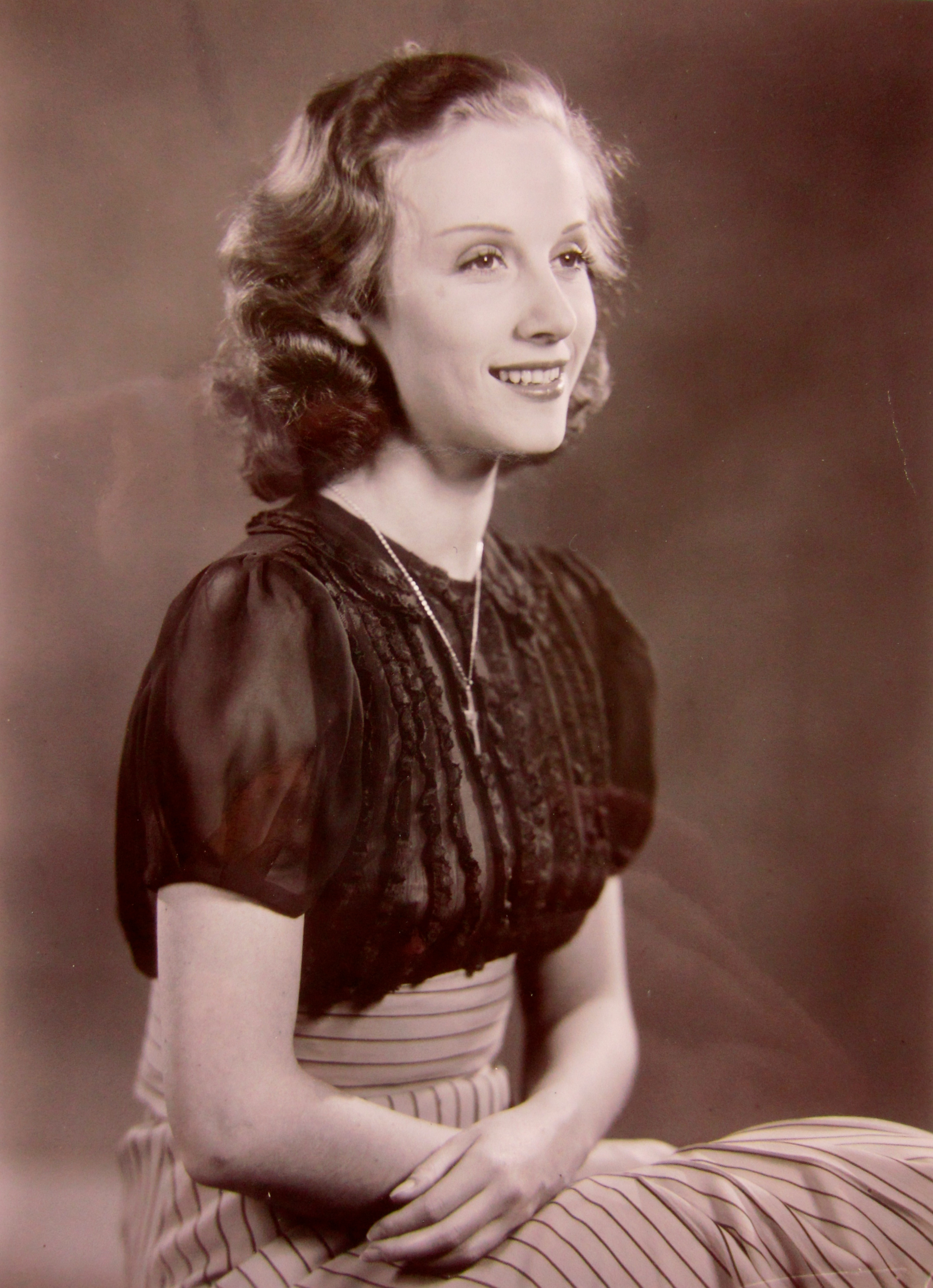
- Marianne Aminoff, photo: Louis Huch.
- Born: 21 September 1916; Uddevalla, Sweden
- Died: 14 April 1984 (aged 67); Stockholm, Sweden
- Occupations: Actress; director
- Years active: 1937–1983

Marianne Aminoff (21 September 1916 – 14 April 1984) was a Swedish actress and director. She was born in Uddevalla, Sweden and died in Stockholm.

She directed a production of Peter Pan at Stockholm City Theatre in 1968.

== Partial filmography ==
- John Ericsson, Victor of Hampton Roads (1937) - Mary
- Thunder and Lightning (1938) - Inga, Puttes kusin
- Styrman Karlssons flammor (1938) - Juanita (uncredited)
- Herr husassistenten (1938) - Flower shop assistant
- Good Friends and Faithful Neighbours (1938) - Greta Ask
- Wanted (1939) - Linnéa
- Frun tillhanda (1939) - Eva
- Mot nya tider (1939) - Eva, deras dotter, som vuxen
- June Night (1940) - Nickan
- Her Melody (1940) - Gullan Karlsson
- One, But a Lion! (1940) - Linda Lejon
- Med dej i mina armar (1940) - Britt
- Magistrarna på sommarlov (1941) - Anna-Lisa
- The Poor Millionaire (1941) - Gittan Svensson
- En sjöman i frack (1942) - Madeleine Haller
- Take Care of Ulla (1942) - Ulla Lundin
- Live Dangerously (1944) - Marion
- Vändkorset (1944) - Ulla le Fort
- Botte i farten (1945) - Ingrid Borg
- I Roslagens famn (1945) - Carmencita
- The Balloon (1946) - Vanda Novak
- Between Brothers (1946) - Ingeborg Brodd
- Här kommer vi... (1947) - Anne-Marie Stålhammar
- Var sin väg (1948) - Sonja Collin
- Sista ringen (1955) - Maria Valberg
- Det är aldrig för sent (1956) - Birgit Karpell
- My Passionate Longing (1956) - Mrs. Grönberg
- Värmlänningarna (1957) - the Gracious wife
- Bröllopet (1973) - Frida Frohm
- Vita Nejlikan (1974) - Assistant Jeweller
- The Last Adventure (1974) - Jimmy's Mother
- Face to Face (1976) - Jenny's Mother
- Långt borta och nära (1976) - Old Woman
- Summer Paradise (1977) - Christina
- Mackan (1977) - French teacher
- Autumn Sonata (1978) - Charlotte's private secretary
- Der Mann, der sich in Luft auflöste (1980) - Mrs. Lindberg
- Fanny and Alexander (1982) - Blenda Vergérus - Biskopsgården
