= Git Gay =

Swedish revue director, actress and singer

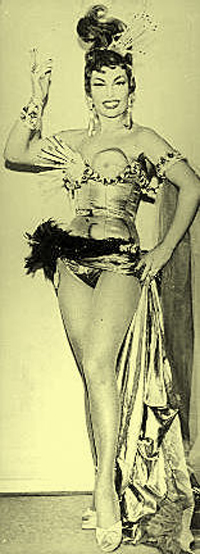
Git Gay in 1960

Birgit Carp (13 July 1921 – 2 July 2007), better known by her screen name Git Gay, was a Swedish revue director, actress, and singer.

Gay was born Birgit Agda Holmberg in 1921 in Karlshamn, Sweden. Her parents wanted her to become a concerto pianist and sent her to the Music Conservatory in Malmö. However, in the late 1940s, she was invited to act as a prima donna in a summer revue by director Sigge Holmberg.

The following year, she performed at the Gröna Lund in Stockholm in the revue Klart Grönan. In 1949, she was hired by the entertainer Karl Gerhard to participate in the revue Där de stora torskarna går in Gothenburg.

In the 1950s, she performed with actor Åke Söderblom in Ge mig en lektion i kärlek, a show that was sold out for three seasons. Towards the end of the 1950s, she worked with actors such as Nils Poppe and Albert Gaubier at the Södran Theatre in Malmö, and with director Hagge Geigert at Uddevalla.

In 1960, she set up the Git Gay Show at Lorensberg Theatre in Gothenburg. The show is sometimes considered the first modern restaurant performance in Sweden. Git Gay took personal responsibility for directing, choreography, and designing the costumes. She went to Las Vegas to get inspiration for the show. Gay set up 20 different stage shows, with some performed at the legendary restaurant and entertainment venue Hamburger Börs in Stockholm.

== Last years/death ==
In the beginning of the 1990s, she was a senior television presenter in a series of revues from Gothenburg. She was married to Lennart Carp until his death in 1991. She died in Malmö in 2007, 11 days before her 86th birthday.

== Selected filmography ==
- A Ghost on Holiday (1951)
- Blondie, Beef and the Banana (1952)
- Laugh Bomb (1954)
- More Than a Match for the Navy (1958)
- Only a Waiter (1959)
- A Lion in Town (1959)
