= Nightmare (1965 film) =

1965 film

- Directed by: Arne Mattsson
- Written by: Per Wahlöö; Arne Mattsson
- Produced by: Lorens Marmstedt
- Starring: Ulla Jacobsson; Gunnar Hellström; Sven Lindberg
- Cinematography: Max Wilén
- Edited by: Ulla Ryghe
- Music by: Georg Riedel
- Production company: Svensk Filmindustri
- Distributed by: Svensk Filmindustri
- Release date: 20 December 1965
- Running time: 101 minutes
- Country: Sweden
- Language: Swedish

Nightmare (Swedish: Nattmara) is a 1965 Swedish thriller film directed by Arne Mattsson and starring Ulla Jacobsson, Gunnar Hellström and Sven Lindberg. It was shot at the Råsunda Studios in Stockholm. The film's sets were designed by the art director P.A. Lundgren.

== Cast ==
- Ulla Jacobsson as Maj Berg
- Gunnar Hellström as Per Berg
- Sven Lindberg as Police Capt. Peter Storm
- Mimi Pollak as Anna Söderblom
- Mona Malm as Pia Bolt
- Tord Peterson as Max Eriksson-Berg
- Ingrid Backlin as Elsa Johansson
- Christina Carlwind as Eva Jansson
- Rune Halvarsson as Erik Boman
- Marianne Karlbeck as Berta Larsson
- Birger Lensander as Messenger

== Bibliography ==
- Qvist, Per Olov & von Bagh, Peter. Guide to the Cinema of Sweden and Finland. Greenwood Publishing Group, 2000.
