= Georg Adelly =

Swedish film actor

- Born: 19 October 1919; Vardal, Norway
- Died: 26 October 1997 (aged 78); Gothenburg, Sweden
- Occupation: Actor
- Years active: 1948–1984

Georg Adelly (19 October 1919 – 26 October 1997) was a Swedish film actor. He appeared in 34 films between 1948 and 1984.

== Selected filmography ==
- Loffe as a Millionaire (1948)
- Father Bom (1949)
- Knockout at the Breakfast Club (1950)
- A Ghost on Holiday (1951)
- The Green Lift (1952)
- Say It with Flowers (1952)
- Sju svarta be-hå (1954)
- Far och flyg (1955)
- The Minister of Uddarbo (1957)
- More Than a Match for the Navy (1958)
- Åsa-Nisse as a Policeman (1960)
- Harry Munter (1969)
- Rasmus på luffen (1981)
