= Kai Gullmar =

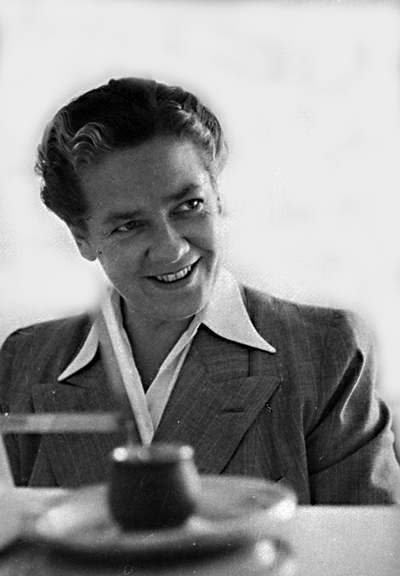
- Kai Gullmar, circa 1935

Background information
- Born: Gurli Maria Bergström; 2 April 1905; Sundsvall, Sweden
- Origin: Swedish
- Died: 25 March 1982 (aged 76) Stockholm, Sweden
- Genres: schlager music
- Occupations: composer, musician, singer, actress
- Years active: 1928–1961

Kai Gullmar (pseudonym for Gurli Maria Bergström), (2 April 1905 in Sundsvall – 25 March 1982 in Stockholm), was a Swedish composer, musician, singer and actress. Gullmar wrote music for more than 40 films between 1937 and 1960.

== Biography ==
In 1924–1925, Gullmar studied in London. After her return to Sweden, she settled in Stockholm; she made her debut as a performer in a revue by Ernst Rolf in 1929. However, Gullmar's parents forbade her from performing on stage, and she started working as a recording artist and composer for His Master's Voice instead.

Gullmar soon emerged as one of Sweden's leading composers of schlager music, with entertainers such as Ulla Billquist, Karin Juel, Harry Brandelius and Karl Gerhard recording her compositions. During her career, Gullmar wrote music for more than 47 Swedish films. Simultaneously, she continued recording her own music and acting in revues as well as films.

Kai Gullmar was openly lesbian and became known for her often androgynous way of dressing. She is buried at Norra begravningsplatsen in Stockholm.

== Known melodies ==
En natt på Ancora bar (1933), Det borde vara förbjudet med så vackra ögon (1937), Blonda John (1938), Solen lyser även på liten stuga (1939), Ungmön på Käringön (1940), Swing it, magistern! (1940), Med dej i mina armar (1940), Om du bara ler mot mej nå'n gång (1941), En vårnatt i Wien (1941), En liten smula kärlek (1941), Pythagoras swing (1941), Swing ändå (1941), Blå ögon som förgätmigej (1942), De stora elefanternas dans (1942), Utan mej (1942), Som du vill ha mej (1943), Anna från Dalen gick på Nalen (1948), Bussvisan (1956), I Heidelberg (1956), En viol, monsieur, Jag har en liten melodi, Med käckhet och fräckhet and Ordning på torpet.

== Selected filmography ==
- The Andersson Family (1937)
- Adolf Saves the Day (1938)
- Her Melody (1940)
- Sonja (1943)
- A Girl for Me (1943)
- The Sixth Shot (1943)
- Dolly Takes a Chance (1944)
- Evening at the Djurgarden (1946)
- Den långa vägen (1947)
- Private Bom (1948)
- Loffe as a Millionaire (1948)
- Playing Truant (1949)
- Lattjo med Boccaccio (1949)
- Andersson's Kalle (1950)
- A Ghost on Holiday (1951)
- 91 Karlssons bravader (1951)
- Spöke på semester (1951)
- Enslingen Johannes (1957)
- Åsa-Nisse as a Policeman (1960)
- Åsa-Nisse bland graver och baroner (1961)
