= Lille Bror Söderlundh =

Swedish composer and conductor (1912–1957)

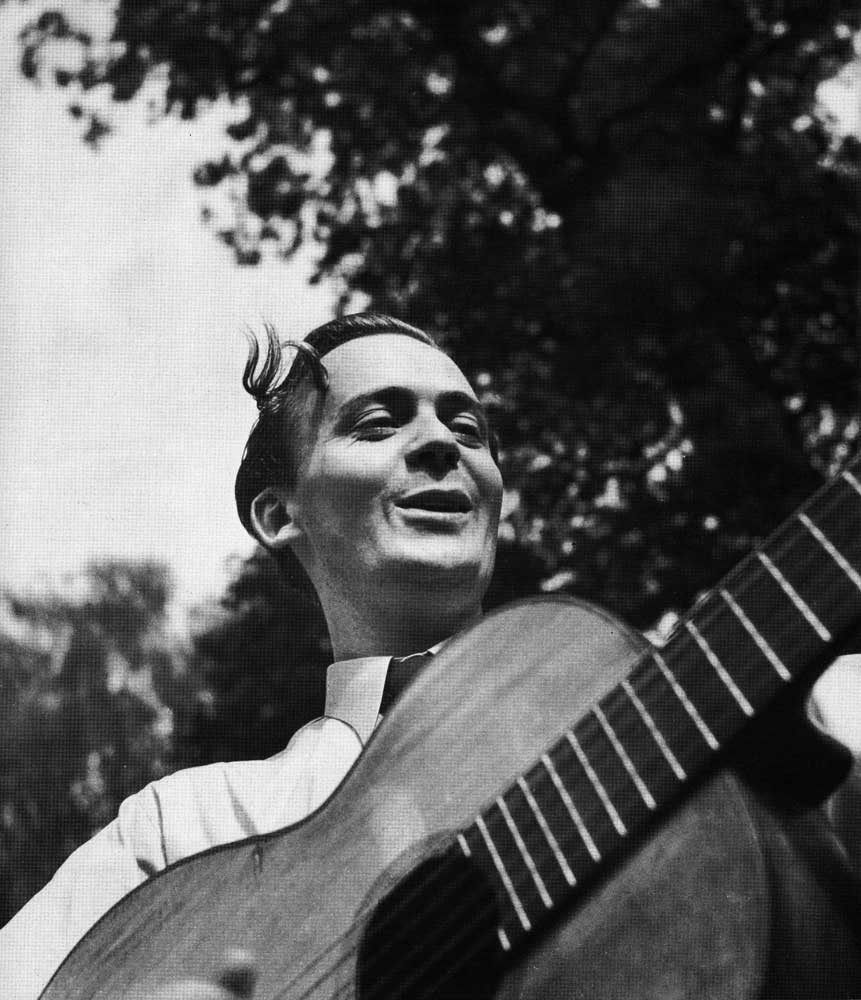
- Lille Bror Söderlundh 1940

Background information
- Born: Bror Axel Söderlundh; 21 May 1912; Kristinehamn, Sweden
- Died: 23 August 1957 (aged 45) Stockholm, Sweden
- Occupations: Composer, singer

Bror Axel (Lille Bror) Söderlundh (21 May 1912 – 23 August 1957) was a Swedish composer and singer. He composed music for many Swedish films. He also wrote classical music, including the Concertino for Oboe and Strings which has been performed by the conductor Esa-Pekka Salonen.

He was born in 1912 in Kristinehamn. In 1929 he moved to Stockholm and studied violin.

In 1940, he worked on the anti-nazi satire performance of Den ökända hästen från Troja (The Notorious Horse from Troy) with Karl Gerhard.

He married ceramicist and textile artist Lisbet Jobs and they had two children, Michael Söderlundh and Stina Söderlundh.

== Selected works ==
=== Opera ===
- Flygande trumman, Children's Opera (1953); libretto by Lennart Hellsing

=== Orchestra ===
- Fyra korta sommarstycken (4 Short Summer Melodies) for string orchestra (1933)
- Tre folkliga valser for string orchestra (1945)
- Vintermåne, Meditation for oboe, 2 clarinets and string orchestra (1945)
- Nattvisa till Lindelin for string orchestra (1946)
- Nattvisa till Lindelin for string orchestra (1946)
- Till en koreograf, Ballet Suite (1946)
- Valsintermezzo for chamber orchestra (1947)
- Kejsarn av Portugallien (The Emperor of Portugallia), Ballet Suite (1950)
- Adagio for string orchestra (1956)
- Ostinato, Studie II for string orchestra (1956)
- Christina-Musik, Suite for string orchestra (published 1958)
- Fem visor for chamber orchestra and jazz combo
- Polka

=== Concertante ===
- Allegro concertante for 2 violins and string orchestra (1935)
- Concertino for oboe and string orchestra (1944)
- Dalamusik for clarinet and string orchestra (1945)
- Havängsvit for piano and string orchestra (1945–1953)
- Siciliana seria for viola and string orchestra (1946)
- Concerto for violin and orchestra (1954)
- Concerto No.2 for violin and orchestra (1951)

=== Chamber music ===
- Adagio for string quartet (1933)
- Tre små stycken for violin, cello and harp (1938)
- Liten vals for two guitars (1942)
- Enkelt stycke (A Single Piece) for flute and piano (1944)
- Liten svit nr 1 for clarinet and piano (1945)
- Sommarmusik, Little Suite for flute, oboe, violin, cello and harp (1945)
- Stämningsbilder, Quintet for flute, oboe, violin, cello and harp (1946)
- Idea 1 & 2 for saxophone quartet (1949)
- Vid en ung diktares bortgång for string quartet (1954)
- Zwei Inventionen (Two Inventions) for clarinet or viola and piano (organ ad lib.) (1955)
- Fria variationer på eget tema (Free Variations on an Original Theme) for violin, viola and cello (1957)
- Lyrisk svit for violin or flute, viola and guitar
- Miniatyrer for 2 violins (premiere 1996)
- Canzonetta for violin and piano

=== Piano ===
- Soave for piano (1947)
- Allegro
- Vals - Pesante - Polka for piano 4-hands

=== Choral ===
- Casida om den klara döden for female chorus and piano (1940); words by Federico García Lorca
- Tre kosteliga ting for female chorus and piano (1943–1949); words by Ingegerd Granlund
- Ynglingen och stjärnan, Cantata for soloists, mixed chorus and orchestra (1951); words by Owe Husahr
- Impressioner till Hugo Alfvén for narrator, soloists, mixed chorus and string quartet (1952); words by Rune Lindström
- Tre madrigaler for mixed chorus a cappella (1952); words by Gunnar Björling
- Tvenne madrigaler i Wivallii anda for male chorus (or mixed chorus) a cappella (1952); words by Rune Lindström
- Herre, lär mig betänka for mixed chorus a cappella (1956); Biblical text: Psalms 39:5
- Det är ej tid for mixed chorus a cappella (published 1961); words by Harald Forss
- Dig är en törnkrans for male chorus a cappella; words by Gunnar Björling
- För vilsna fötter sjunger gräset for male chorus or mixed chorus a cappella (published 1953); words by Hjalmar Gullberg
- Höstsyrsan for male chorus a cappella (published 1961); words by Harry Martinson
- Inte ens en grå liten fågel for male chorus a cappella; words by Nils Ferlin
- Jag biter i himlen for male chorus a cappella; words by Sven Alfons
- Jag skall hålla mig i min hand for mixed chorus a cappella; words by Sven Alfons
- Kväll i inlandet for male chorus a cappella; words by Harry Martinson
- Lärkan for male chorus a cappella; words by Ragnar Jändel
- Människans hem for male chorus a cappella; words by Erik Blomberg
- Nattmusik for male chorus a cappella (published 1961); words by Anna Greta Wide
- Så ensam for female chorus and piano; words by Maria Wine
- Sång till Dalarna for male chorus a cappella; words by August Berglund

=== Vocal ===
- Jag var ett speglande vatten for voice and piano (1945); words by Emil Zilliacus
- Vitt land for voice and piano (1945); words by Ebba Lindqvist
- Tuna-svit for soprano, baritone and chamber orchestra (1951); words by Owe Husahr
- Impressioner till Hugo Alfven for voice and string quartet (1952)
- Då är du en frostros på rutan for voice and piano; words by Moa Martinson
- En valsmelodi for voice and piano; words by Nils Ferlin
- Inte ens for voice and piano; words by Nils Ferlin
- Jag ville vara tårar for voice and piano; words by Erik Blomberg
- Sorgmantel och andra visor for voice and piano or guitar
- Stjärnan i din hand for voice and piano; words by Owe Husahr
- Vaxkabinett for 2 sopranos, alto and piano
- Vilse for voice and piano; words by Nils Ferlin

=== Film scores ===
Year	Original title	English title	Notes
1939	Frun tillhanda		
1942	Himlaspelet	The Heavenly Play	directed by Alf Sjöberg
1943	Livet måste levas		
1944	The Emperor of Portugallia		directed by Gustaf Molander
1945	Jagad		directed by Bengt Palm
1945	Tre söner gick till flyget		directed by Rolf Husberg
1945	Vandring med månen	Wandering with the Moon	directed by Hasse Ekman
1945	13 stolar	Thirteen Chairs	
1946	I dödens väntrum	Interlude	directed by Hasse Ekman
1947	Tant Grön, Tant Brun och Tant Gredelin	Aunt Green, Aunt Brown and Aunt Lilac	
1949	Smeder på luffen	Vagabond Blacksmiths	directed by Hampe Faustman
1949	Stora Hoparegränd och himmelriket		
1950	When Love Came to the Village		
1952	Mot framtiden		directed by Rune Lindström
1953	The Road to Klockrike		directed by Gunnar Skoglund
1953	Vi tre debutera	We Three Debutantes	
1954	Storm Over Tjurö		
1954	Dance in the Smoke		directed by Yngve Gamlin and Bengt Blomgren
1954	Karin Månsdotter		directed by Alf Sjöberg
1954	Ung man söker sällskap		
1955	Sista ringen		
1955	Luffaren och Rasmus		after the book by Astrid Lindgren, directed by Rolf Husberg
1957	A Dreamer's Journey		
1957	Far till sol och vår		directed by Lars-Eric Kjellgren
1959	Midsommardröm i fattighuset		made for TV

== Notes and references ==
- Mattsson, Christina (2000). Lille Bror Söderlundh: Tonsättare och viskompositör. Atlantis. ISBN 9789174865363.
