= A Ghost on Holiday =

1951 film

- Directed by: Gösta Bernhard
- Written by: Gösta Bernhard; Stig Bergendorff
- Produced by: Ragnar Brandhild
- Starring: Stig Järrel; Ingrid Backlin; Sven Magnusson
- Cinematography: Göran Strindberg
- Edited by: Lennart Wallén; Carl-Olov Skeppstedt
- Music by: Svend Asmussen; Per-Martin Hamberg; Charlie Norman
- Production company: Sandrews
- Distributed by: Sandrew-Baumanfilm
- Release date: 3 September 1951
- Running time: 75 minutes
- Country: Sweden
- Language: Swedish

A Ghost on Holiday (Swedish: Spöke på Semester) is a 1951 Swedish comedy film directed by Gösta Bernhard and starring Stig Järrel, Ingrid Backlin and Sven Magnusson. It was shot at the Centrumateljéerna Studios in Stockholm. The film's sets were designed by the art director P.A. Lundgren.

== Cast ==
- Stig Järrel as Trynvald Borgkrona / Sebastian Borgkrona
- Ingrid Backlin as Gullan Adolfsvärd
- Sven Magnusson as Maalbrott, lawyer
- Åke Fridell as Bovén, agronomist
- Arne Källerud as Viktor
- Douglas Håge as Mr. Vilhelm Adolfsvärd
- Astrid Bodin as Mrs. Adolfsvärd
- Git Gay as Saloon singer
- Irene Söderblom as Fair Beatrice
- Kai Gullmar as White lady
- Georg Adelly as The bat
- Ulla-Carin Rydén as Karin
- Eric Gustafson as Bartender
- Helga Brofeldt as Julia
- Tom Walter as Simonsson
- Birger Åsander as Algot
- Margit Andelius as Kristin
- Carl-Axel Elfving as Story-teller at radio
- Carl-Gustaf Lindstedt as Kling from country police
- Wilma Malmlöf as Beata, cook
- John Melin as Monk
- John Norrman as Gold digger

== Bibliography ==
- Krawc, Alfred. International Directory of Cinematographers, Set- and Costume Designers in Film: Denmark, Finland, Norway, Sweden (from the beginnings to 1984). Saur, 1986.
- Qvist, Per Olov & von Bagh, Peter. Guide to the Cinema of Sweden and Finland. Greenwood Publishing Group, 2000.
