= Äktenskapsbrottaren =

1964 film

- Directed by: Hasse Ekman
- Written by: Hasse Ekman based on L'Hôtel du libre échange by Georges Feydeau and Maurice Desvallières
- Starring: Gunnar Björnstrand; Siv Ericks; Carl-Gustaf Lindstedt; Birgitta Andersson; Sven Lindberg; Anna Sundqvist; Stig Grybe; Gösta Ekman
- Cinematography: Martin Bodin
- Edited by: Carl-Olov Skeppstedt
- Music by: Georg Riedel
- Distributed by: Svensk Filmindustri
- Release date: 16 December 1964
- Running time: 94 minutes
- Country: Sweden
- Language: Swedish

Äktenskapsbrottaren (English: Marriage wrestler) is a 1964 Swedish comedy film directed by Hasse Ekman. The film is based on Georges Feydeau and Maurice Desvallières play L'Hôtel du libre échange from 1894.

== Cast ==
- Gunnar Björnstrand as Emil Fäger, photographer
- Siv Ericks as Agnes Fäger, Emils wife
- Carl-Gustaf Lindstedt as Hjalmar Korpulin
- Birgitta Andersson as Isabella Korpulin, Hjalmars wife
- Sven Lindberg as Pettersson-Rask, habitual offender
- Anna Sundqvist as Svea, Fägers maid
- Gösta Ekman as Sixten, Korpulins nephew, studio assistant
- Stig Grybe as Bror Victorin
- Olof Thunberg as Commissioner Vilja
- Sune Mangs as Paavo, right-hand man at Hotel Eros
- John Melin as Purén, hotel manager and porter
- Sigge Fürst as conductor
- Nils Eklund as Klemming, javelin-man
- Sonja Karlsson as Tilda, Victorins daughter
- Desirée Edlund as Hilda, Victorins daughter
- Birgitta Svensson as Milda, Victorins daughter
- Lis Nilheim as Vilda, Victorins daughter
- Bellan Roos as Clerk of the power storage
- Georg Skarstedt as the priest
