= More Than a Match for the Navy =

1958 film

- Directed by: Stig Olin
- Written by: Nils Poppe
- Produced by: Allan Ekelund
- Starring: Nils Poppe; Harriet Andersson; Yvonne Lombard
- Cinematography: Martin Bodin
- Edited by: Ingemar Ejve
- Music by: Hans Schreiber
- Production company: Komiska Teatern
- Distributed by: Sandrew-Baumanfilm
- Release date: 15 September 1958
- Running time: 87 minutes
- Country: Sweden
- Language: Swedish

More Than a Match for the Navy (Swedish: Flottans överman) is a 1958 Swedish comedy film directed by Stig Olin and starring Nils Poppe, Harriet Andersson and Yvonne Lombard. It was part of a series of films featuring Poppe as the recurring character Fabian Bom. The film's sets were designed by the art director P.A. Lundgren. It was shot in Eastmancolor at the Råsunda Studios in Stockholm and on location in Barcelona and Benicarló in Spain.

== Synopsis ==
Fabian Bom is working for the Swedish export council and is sent abroad on a navy cruiser to promote Spanish businesses. His fiancée Gullan is irritated that he is married to his work and follows him to Barcelona. He also encounters the free-spirited Linnea. In Barcelona he meets Vera, the Swedish wife of a local businessmen. A variety of complications ensue in which Bom is pursued by an irate bullfighter.

== Cast ==
- Nils Poppe as Fabian Bom
- Harriet Andersson as Linnea Berg
- Yvonne Lombard as Gullan Polander
- Sigge Fürst as Karlsson
- Git Gay as Vera Cavalcante
- Gösta Bernhard as Eduardo Cavalcante
- Sven-Eric Gamble as Halland
- Georg Adelly as Sjöman
- Sten Gester as Harry Sandberg
- Fritiof Billquist as Kapten Reling
- Rolf Botvid as Löjtnant
- Jaime Avellán as Diego Manolo
- Einar Axelsson as Rossling
- Svea Holst as Fröken Svensson
- Bellan Roos as Spansk affärskvinna
- Michèle Apfelbaum as Flicka på Los Caracoles
- Sten Ardenstam as Manolos hejduk
- Tore Bengtsson as Manolos hejduk
- Yvonne Brosset as Dansare på Los Caracoles
- Göthe Grefbo as Kypare
- Birgitta Grönwald as Flicka på Los Caracoles
- Siv Järrel as Flygvärdinna
- Davyla Lewenbruk as Flicka på Los Caracoles
- Sven Melin as Gäst på Los Caracoles
- Rune Ottoson as Manolos hejduk
- Torsten Sjöholm as Manolos hejduk
- Georg Skarstedt as Hovmästare på Los Caracoles
- Alexander von Baumgarten as Los Caracoles ägare
- Chris Wahlström as Servitris på Los Caracoles

== Bibliography ==
- Qvist, Per Olov & von Bagh, Peter. Guide to the Cinema of Sweden and Finland. Greenwood Publishing Group, 2000.
