= The Atlantic Adventure =

1934 film

- Directed by: Lorens Marmstedt; Edvin Adolphson
- Written by: Torsten Flodén; Lorens Marmstedt
- Based on: Potyautas by Sándor Lestyán and János Vaszary
- Produced by: Lorens Marmstedt
- Starring: Birgit Tengroth; Valdemar Dalquist; Margit Manstad
- Cinematography: Elner Åkesson
- Edited by: Rolf Husberg
- Music by: Jules Sylvain
- Production company: Svensk Filmindustri
- Distributed by: Svensk Filmindustri
- Release date: 5 February 1934
- Running time: 88 minutes
- Country: Sweden
- Language: Swedish

The Atlantic Adventure (Swedish: Atlantäventyret) is a 1934 Swedish comedy film directed by Lorens Marmstedt and Edvin Adolphson and starring Birgit Tengroth, Valdemar Dalquist and Margit Manstad. It was shot at the Råsunda Studios in Stockholm. The film's sets were designed by the art director Arne Åkermark.

== Cast ==
- Birgit Tengroth as Tusse Telmi
- Valdemar Dalquist as Freddy Alsterberg, Theatrical Manager
- Edvin Adolphson as First Mate
- Margit Manstad as Rita Grey
- John Ekman as Baron Winkelstein
- Carl-Gunnar Wingård as van Haag, Dutch Jeweller
- Carl Ström as Captain
- Gunnar Olsson as Bob Holgert, Machinist
- Emmy Albiin as Old Woman
- Carl Andersson as Utmätningsmannens biträde
- Sven Arefeldt as Båtpassagerare
- Bror Berger as Johansson
- Allan Bohlin as Besättingsman
- Rolf Botvid as Dansande man
- Artur Cederborgh as Jocke Svensson
- Annalisa Ericson as Cleaning Lady
- Carl Ericson as Maskinchef
- Emil Fjellström as Besättingsman
- Karin Granberg as Kvinna i baren
- Wilhelm Haqvinius as Man vid gripandet av Winkelstein
- Carl Harald as Utmätningsmannens biträde
- Håkan Jahnberg as Berusad man
- Helge Kihlberg as Hovmästare
- Börje Lundh as Stewarden med telegram
- Sven Magnusson as Besättingsman
- John Melin as Besättningsman
- Nils Nordståhl as Båtpassagerare
- Yngve Nyqvist as Båtpassagerare
- Knut Pehrson as Båtpassagerare
- Stina Ståhle as Båtpassagerare
- Harald Svensson as Dansande man
- Ilse-Nore Tromm as Dansande kvinna
- Nils Wahlbom as Utmätningsmannen
- Tom Walter as Besättningsman

== Bibliography ==
- Qvist, Per Olov & von Bagh, Peter. Guide to the Cinema of Sweden and Finland. Greenwood Publishing Group, 2000.
