= Dear John (1964 film) =

Käre John
- Directed by: Lars-Magnus Lindgren
- Written by: Lars-Magnus Lindgren; Olle Länsberg (novel)
- Release date: 23 November 1964
- Running time: 115 minutes
- Country: Sweden
- Language: Swedish
- Box office: $4,000,000 (US/ Canada)

Dear John (Swedish: Käre John) is a 1964 Swedish film directed by Lars-Magnus Lindgren and starring Jarl Kulle and Christina Schollin. The motion picture is especially known for nude scenes unusual for the time, and for the natural performances in them that caused the film considerable notoriety in the United States. It was nominated for the Academy Award for Best Foreign Language Film.

== Plot ==
John Berndtsson, skipper of the Öresund cutter Elsa av Bleket, has finally found the woman of his dreams. In a passionate night together, they reminisce about the events that brought them together, despite past misunderstandings and hardships.

It all began when John and his young crew docked in Flintehamn one Saturday, planning to spend the weekend there. In a local café, John was immediately drawn to Anita, who served him. Despite Anita's initial hesitation due to her daughter Helena, she agreed to dinner with John, having known him from a previous encounter tainted by his drunkenness.

Both John and Anita carry their own baggage. John struggles with loneliness and failed relationships since his divorce, while Anita is a single mother, abandoned by her daughter's father. Despite these challenges, they find themselves drawn to each other once again when they unexpectedly meet on a nude beach.

As night falls, Anita expresses her desire for intimacy, but John's physical desires lead to frustration when their expectations don't align. In a moment of desperation, John acts out, but Anita's rejection prompts him to leave. However, Anita, fearing John's disdain, chases after him, and they reconcile, finally opening up to each other and building trust.

The next day, amidst joyful play in the water, John receives surprising news of Anita and Helena's departure for a vacation. In an envelope left behind, he discovers Anita's real name, Anna, along with a heartfelt thank-you note. Moved by her gesture, John seeks out Anna and asks for her hand in marriage, to which she joyfully responds, cementing their bond.

== Cast ==
- Jarl Kulle - John Berndtsson
- Christina Schollin - Anna
- Helena Nilsson - Helena
- Erik Hell - Yngve Lindgren
- Emy Storm - Karin Lindgren
- Morgan Andersson - Raymond
- Synnøve Liljebæck - Dagny
- Hans Wigren - Elon
- Håkan Serner - Erwin
- Bo Wahlström - Bosse
- Erland Nordenfalk - Kurt

== See also ==
- List of submissions to the 38th Academy Awards for Best Foreign Language Film
- List of Swedish submissions for the Academy Award for Best Foreign Language Film
