= Far och flyg =

1955 film

- Directed by: Gösta Bernhard
- Written by: Gösta Bernhard
- Produced by: Lars Burman
- Starring: Dirch Passer
- Cinematography: Jan Lindeström
- Edited by: Carl-Olov Skeppstedt
- Release date: 21 February 1955
- Running time: 74 minutes
- Country: Sweden
- Language: Swedish

Far och flyg (lit. 'fare and fly', "go away/sod off") is a 1955 Swedish film directed by Gösta Bernhard and starring Dirch Passer.

== Cast ==
- Dirch Passer - Peder
- Åke Grönberg - Hagfors
- Irene Söderblom - Agneta Jansson
- Georg Adelly - Albin
- Rut Holm - Mrs. Hermansson
- Arne Källerud - Dröm
- Curt Åström - Åkerlind
- Sven Holmberg - Pilot at restaurant
- Stig Johanson - Prof. Schmultz
- Gunnar Lindkvist - Lindström
- Sven Lykke - Passenger / Gangster in Peder's dream
- John Melin - Saint Peter in Peder's dream
- Gösta Bernhard - Professor Edvardsson - archeologist (uncredited)
- Curt Randelli - Matilda's parrot (voice) (uncredited)
- Ib Schønberg - Autograph hunter (uncredited)
