= The Sixth Commandment (1947 film) =

1947 Swedish film

- Directed by: Stig Järrel
- Written by: Arne Mehrens
- Produced by: Stellan Claësson
- Starring: Stig Järrel; Ester Roeck Hansen; Gösta Cederlund; Ingrid Backlin
- Cinematography: Walter Boberg
- Edited by: Eric Nordemar
- Music by: Jules Sylvain
- Production company: Kungsfilm
- Distributed by: Kungsfilm
- Release date: 27 September 1947
- Running time: 112 minutes
- Country: Sweden
- Language: Swedish

The Sixth Commandment (Swedish: Sjätte budet) is a 1947 Swedish drama film directed by and starring Stig Järrel and also featuring Ester Roeck Hansen, Gösta Cederlund and Ingrid Backlin. It was shot at the Centrumateljéerna Studios in Stockholm. The film's sets were designed by the art director Nils Nilsson. The title refers to the Sixth Commandment for Lutherans "Thou shalt not commit adultery".

== Synopsis ==
Jane Hagwald has been married for many years and has grown gradually dissatisfied in the relationship, and she takes a lover. When her daughter discovers her affair she drives her out of the home.

== Cast ==
- Ester Roeck Hansen as Jane Hagwald
- Stig Järrel as Dr. Krister Ekberg
- Gösta Cederlund as Karl hagwald
- Ingrid Backlin as Kerstin Hagwald
- Irma Christenson as Märta Widen
- Lauritz Falk as Bengt Bernfors
- Margot Ryding as Maja
- Mimi Pollak as Woman
- Ebba Wrede as Woman
- Anna-Stina Wåglund as Woman

== Bibliography ==
- Ramsaye, Terry. International Motion Picture Almanac. Quigley Publishing Company, 1948.
