= Gunnar Hellström =

Swedish actor

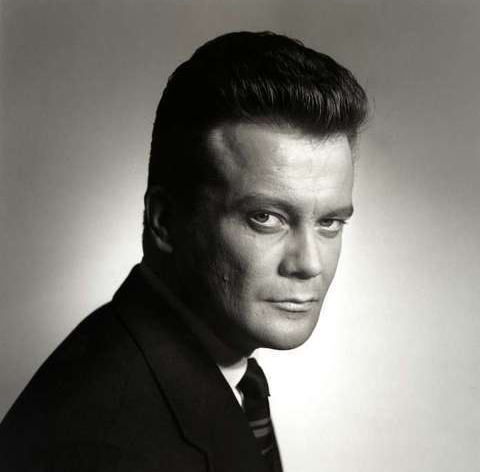
- Gunnar Hellström
- Born: 6 December 1928; Sundsvall, Sweden
- Died: 28 November 2001 (aged 72); Nynäshamn, Sweden
- Occupations: Actor, director
- Years active: 1952–1994

Gunnar Hellström (6 December 1928 – 28 November 2001) was a Swedish actor and director.

== Partial filmography ==
- While the City Sleeps (1950) – Young Man in Restaurant
- U-Boat 39 (1952) – Harriet's Escort
- She Came Like the Wind (1952) – Olle
- Barabbas (1953) – Worker in Pottery (uncredited)
- Marianne (1953) – Birger Wessel
- The Chieftain of Göinge (1953) – Lars Paulinus
- Karin Månsdotter (1954) – Bonde
- Simon the Sinner (1954) – Simon Angus
- Night Child (1956) – Nils Gustaf Boman
- Synnöve Solbakken (1957) – Aslak
- The Judge (1960) – Albert Arnold, Lawyer
- Karneval (1961) – Gösta Nordström
- Return to Peyton Place (1961) – Nils Larsen
- Rififi in Stockholm (1961) – Erik Johansson
- Combat! (1962–1963, TV Series) – Lt. Leibner – German Paratrooper / Dr. Belzer
- Nightmare (1965) – Per Berg
- 12 O'Clock High (1966) (S2E12 We Are Not Coming Back)
- The Time Tunnel (1967, Episode 'The Ghost of Nero") – German Major
- Mission: Impossible (1967–1969, TV Series) – Friedrich Spindler / Frederick Rudd
- Djungeläventyret Campa-Campa (1976) – Fader John
- Jag rodnar (1981) – Gunnar Sjöman
- Raskenstam (1983) – Gustav Raskenstam
- Dallas (1989, TV Series) – Rolf Brundin
- Zorn (1994) – Anders Zorn (final film role)
- Gunsmoke (1967–1975, 33 Episodes) – as Director
