= Sven Arefeldt =

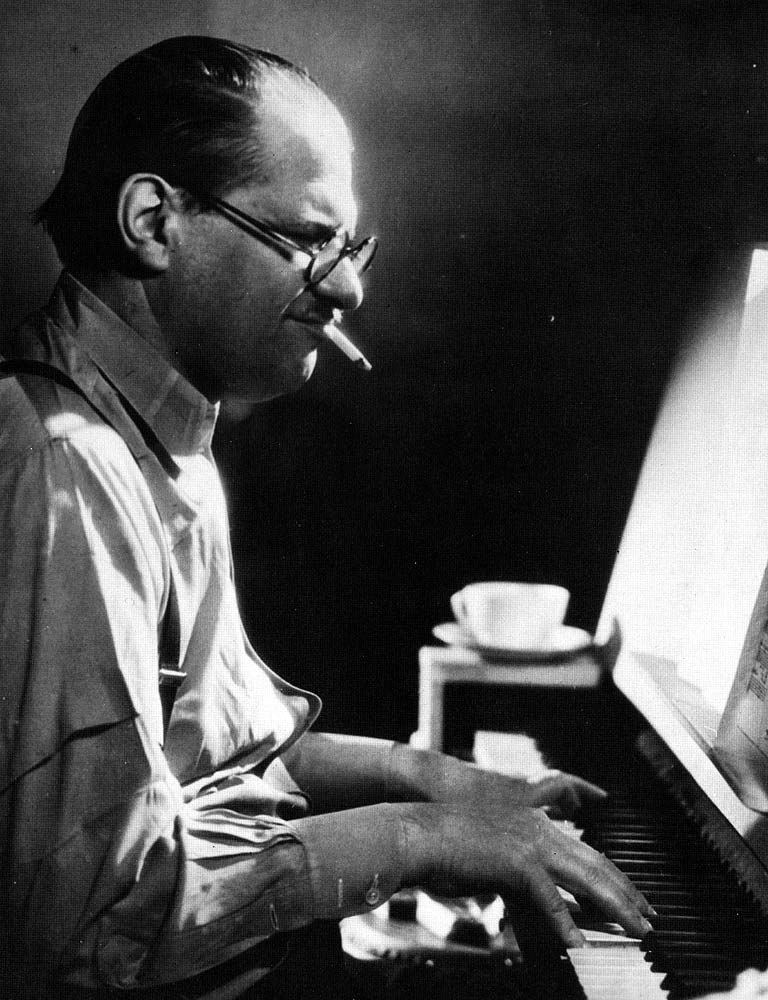
- Born: December 29, 1908; Stockholm, Sweden
- Died: August 17, 1956 (aged 47); Lindesberg, Sweden
- Occupations: Musician; singer; composer
- Musical career
- Instruments: Vocals; piano

Sven Allan Amandus Arefeldt, born Forsberg (29 December 1908 – 17 August 1956), was a Swedish musician, singer and composer.

Arefeldt was born in Stockholm, and spent parts of his youth in Lindesberg, Västmanland. He learned to play the violin at an early age, but soon switched to the piano. In 1924, at age 15, he formed the jazz orchestra TOGO (The Original Green Orchestra). From the late 1920s, Arefeldt played with several jazz orchestras in different music venues in Stockholm. He was one of Sweden's most famous jazz musicians throughout the 1930s.

In 1937, Arefeldt started working for the record label Sonora. Inspired by Fats Waller, he started recording more comedic material and novelty songs from the 1940s onwards. He also hosted a popular radio program, Sven Arefeldt leker på pianot ("Sven Arefeldt Plays With The Piano"). In the 1940s and 1950s, Arefeldt also wrote and arranged music to several films.

Among Arefeldt's popular recordings include "I en roddbåt till Kina", "Hjärtats röst", "Tre små sillar" and "Jag fick en kyss till god natt". Arefeldt voiced the Cheshire Cat in the Swedish dub of the Disney film Alice in Wonderland (1951).

Arefeldt died in Lindesberg, where he is also buried, at age 47 in 1956.

== Selected filmography ==
- Unga hjärtan (1934)
- The Atlantic Adventure (1934)
- Det sägs på stan (1941)
- Kungsgatan (1943)
- Med flyg till sjunde himlen (1949)
- Kvinnan som försvann (1949)
- Flickan från tredje raden (1949)
- Knockout at the Breakfast Club (1950)
- Alice in Wonderland (1951) (voice)
