= Her Melody =

1940 film

- Directed by: Thor L. Brooks
- Written by: Torsten Flodén
- Starring: Sonja Wigert; Sture Lagerwall; Margit Manstad
- Cinematography: Harald Berglund
- Edited by: Wic Kjellin
- Music by: Nathan Baumann; Kai Gullmar; Nathan Görling
- Production company: Europa Film
- Distributed by: Europa Film
- Release date: 16 September 1940
- Running time: 98 minutes
- Country: Sweden
- Language: Swedish

Her Melody (Swedish: Hennes melodi) is a 1940 Swedish comedy film directed by Thor L. Brooks and starring Sonja Wigert, Sture Lagerwall and Margit Manstad. It was shot at the Sundbyberg Studios in Stockholm. The film's sets were designed by the art director Max Linder and Bibi Lindström.

== Synopsis ==
Sonja and Curt meet in a taxi. Both believe the other is from the wealthy upper-classes and try to maintain the pretence.

== Cast ==
- Sonja Wigert as Sonja Larsen
- Sture Lagerwall as Curt Strange
- Margit Manstad as Gloria
- Håkan Westergren as Wicander jr.
- Hilda Borgström as Sonja's Grandmother
- Marianne Aminoff as Gullan Karlsson
- Gösta Cederlund as Uncle Berglund
- Dagmar Ebbesen as Mrs. Lindenstjaerna
- Stig Järrel as Pelle Söderström
- Georg Funkquist as Department manager
- Torsten Winge as Mr. Lindenstjaerna
- Pierre Colliander as Ubbe
- Eivor Engelbrektsson as Inga
- Hilde Majfeldt as Maj
- Wiktor Andersson as Alexander, Lindenstjärna's driver
- Gunnar Björnstrand as Miss Lindenstjärnas fiancé
- Olga Andersson as Guest at Restaurang Bristol
- Gösta Bodin as Svensson at Wicander's
- Carl Ericson as Driver
- Arne Lindblad as Tailor at Wicander's
- Gustaf Lövås as Johan, Wicander's driver

== Bibliography ==
- Qvist, Per Olov & von Bagh, Peter. Guide to the Cinema of Sweden and Finland. Greenwood Publishing Group, 2000.
