= When Love Came to the Village =

1950 film

- Directed by: Arne Mattsson
- Written by: Albert Olsson (novel); Olle Hellbom; Volodja Semitjov
- Produced by: Lennart Landheim
- Starring: Sven Lindberg; Ruth Kasdan; Edvin Adolphson
- Cinematography: Sten Dahlgren; Sven Thermænius
- Edited by: Lennart Wallén
- Music by: Lille Bror Söderlundh
- Production company: Nordisk Tonefilm
- Distributed by: Nordisk Tonefilm
- Release date: 9 October 1950
- Running time: 110 minutes
- Country: Sweden
- Language: Swedish

When Love Came to the Village (Swedish: När kärleken kom till byn) is a 1950 Swedish drama film directed by Arne Mattsson and starring Sven Lindberg, Ruth Kasdan and Edvin Adolphson. It was made at the Centrumateljéerna Studios in Stockholm and on location in Gamleby and Västervik. The film's sets were designed by the art director P.A. Lundgren. It is noted for its more traditional depiction of romantic scenes compared to Mattsson's One Summer of Happiness the following year which featured nudity.

== Synopsis ==
A substitute teacher arrives in a rural area of Sweden to take over the duties of the regular schoolmaster while he is in hospital. His new methods of teaching doesn't impress the locals and he begins a brief affair with the schoolmaster's wife with whom he is staying.

== Cast ==
- Sven Lindberg as Birger Broman
- Ruth Kasdan as Karin
- Edvin Adolphson as J. O. Bengtsson
- Sigge Fürst as Martin
- Irma Christenson as Ella
- Ingrid Thulin as Agneta
- Stig Järrel as Teacher Axel Brunell
- Dagmar Ebbesen as Mrs. Sigrid Bengtsson
- Åke Fridell as Johan
- Ann Bornholm as Anna-Stina, student
- Artur Rolén as Johansson
- Rut Holm as Mrs. Filipson
- Axel Högel as Vicar
- Sven Magnusson as Blåberg
- Olav Riégo as Johansson
- Georg Skarstedt as Parish Clerk
- Ingemar Holde as Johan
- Wiktor Andersson as Man in poor-house
- Bengt Lindström as Helge
- Öyvind Serrander as Anders
- Julia Cæsar as Agneta's host
- Emmy Albiin as Old Lady
- Sonja Rolén as Old Lady

== Bibliography ==
- Björklund, Elisabet & Larsson, Mariah. Swedish Cinema and the Sexual Revolution: Critical Essays. McFarland, 2016.
- Qvist, Per Olov & von Bagh, Peter. Guide to the Cinema of Sweden and Finland. Greenwood Publishing Group, 2000.
