= Sju svarta be-hå =

1954 film

- Directed by: Gösta Bernhard
- Written by: Gösta Bernhard; Ilya Ilf
- Starring: Dirch Passer
- Cinematography: Jan Lindeström
- Edited by: Hans Gullander
- Release date: 22 March 1954
- Running time: 90 minutes
- Country: Sweden
- Language: Swedish

Sju svarta be-hå is a 1954 Swedish crime film directed by Gösta Bernhard and starring Dirch Passer. The plot is based on the 1928 novel The Twelve Chairs by Soviet writing duo Ilf and Petrov.

== Cast ==
- Dirch Passer - Jens Nielsen
- Annalisa Ericson - Gertrud Hall, actress (as Anna-Lisa Ericsson)
- Åke Grönberg - Sture Kaxe
- Hjördis Petterson - Sofia Pang (as Hjördis Pettersson)
- Stig Järrel - Captain Jacob Grönkvist
- Katie Rolfsen - Tina Andersson
- Irene Söderblom - Defrauded Lady
- Siv Ericks - Margareta Beckman
- Rut Holm - Hilda Johansson
- Anna-Lisa Baude - Valborg Jeppman
- Gösta Bernhard - Drunk
- Curt Åström - Vesslan
- John Melin - Burglar
- Ulla-Carin Rydén - Miss Svensson
- Nils Olsson - Beggar
- Georg Adelly - Policeman
