= Loffe as a Millionaire =

1948 film

- Directed by: Gösta Bernhard
- Written by: Gösta Bernhard; Sándor Faragó; Arne Mehrens
- Produced by: Sven Nygren
- Starring: Elof Ahrle; Sture Lagerwall; Irene Söderblom
- Cinematography: Sven Thermænius
- Edited by: Tage Holmberg
- Music by: Kai Gullmar; Olle Lindholm
- Production company: Film AB Imago
- Distributed by: Sveafilm
- Release date: 26 December 1948
- Running time: 90 minutes
- Country: Sweden
- Language: Swedish

Loffe as a Millionaire (Swedish: Loffe som miljonär) is a 1948 Swedish comedy film directed by Gösta Bernhard and starring Elof Ahrle, Sture Lagerwall and Irene Söderblom. It was shot at the Imagoateljéerna Studios in the Stockholm suburb of Stocksund. The film's sets were designed by the art director Nils Nilsson. It was a sequel to the film Loffe the Tramp released earlier the same year.

== Cast ==
- Elof Ahrle as Loffe Frid
- Sture Lagerwall as Heller
- Irene Söderblom as Lisa Lagberg
- Fritiof Billquist as Magnus Häggström
- Marianne Gyllenhammar as Ingrid alias Valencia
- Wiktor Andersson as Trubbnos
- Rut Holm as Tora
- Carl-Gustaf Lindstedt as One of the Knas Brothers
- Nils Olsson as One of the Knas Brothers
- Gunnar 'Knas' Lindkvist as One of the Knas Brothers
- Harry Rydberg as Lången, Tramp
- Harry Sylvner as Skånske Viktor, Tramp
- Alf Östlund as Helmer Igelstam
- Arne Källerud as Actor
- Arne Lindblad as Greven, Tramp
- Gösta Jonsson as Jealous Actor
- Birgit Wåhlander as Mrs. Häggström
- Gunnel Wadner as Nurse
- Rune Stylander as Constable
- Uno Larsson as Tramp
- John Melin as Actor
- Stig Johanson as Pesant
- Ulla-Carin Rydén as Actress from Oskarshamn
- Alexander von Baumgarten as Ulven Pettersson, Tramp
- Ivar Wahlgren as Åkesson, Dentist
- Hugo Jacobsson as Second Dentist
- Siegfried Fischer as Inn-keeper
- Astrid Bodin as Maid
- Georg Adelly as Boxer
- Gösta Bodin as Knight Kuno
- Curt 'Minimal' Åström as Book Keeper

== Bibliography ==
- Goble, Alan. The Complete Index to Literary Sources in Film. Walter de Gruyter, 1999.
