= Sven Holmberg =

Swedish actor

- Born: 9 February 1918; Norrköping, Sweden
- Died: 1 April 2003 (aged 85); Stockholm, Sweden
- Occupation: Actor
- Years active: 1949-1988

Sven Holmberg (9 February 1918 – 1 April 2003) was a Swedish actor. He appeared in more than 60 films and television shows between 1949 and 1988.

== Selected filmography ==
- Love Wins Out (1949)
- Knockout at the Breakfast Club (1950)
- My Name Is Puck (1951)
- Classmates (1952)
- Speed Fever (1953)
- The Shadow (1953)
- Unmarried Mothers (1953)
- The Chieftain of Göinge (1953)
- A Night in the Archipelago (1953)
- Taxi 13 (1954)
- Far och flyg (1955)
- Darling of Mine (1955)
- Whoops! (1955)
- Voyage in the Night (1955)
- Uncle's (1955)
- The Biscuit (1956)
- Night Child (1956)
- Woman in a Fur Coat (1958)
- Åsa-Nisse in Military Uniform (1958)
- Miss April (1958)
- A Lion in Town (1959)
- Sten Stensson Returns (1963)
- Sailors (1964)
- Emil and the Piglet (1973)
