= Simon the Sinner =

1954 film

- Directed by: Gunnar Hellström
- Written by: Tore Zetterholm; Gunnar Hellström
- Based on: Simon Trollkarlen by Tore Zetterholm
- Produced by: Lars Burman
- Starring: Gunnar Hellström; Ann-Marie Gyllenspetz; Stig Järrel
- Cinematography: Jan Lindeström
- Edited by: Wic Kjellin
- Music by: Torbjörn Lundquist
- Production company: Metronome Studios
- Distributed by: Freja Film
- Release date: 15 November 1954
- Running time: 85 minutes
- Country: Sweden
- Language: Swedish

Simon the Sinner (Swedish: Simon syndaren) is a 1954 Swedish drama film directed by Gunnar Hellström and starring Hellström, Ann-Marie Gyllenspetz and Stig Järrel. It was shot at the Stocksund Studios in Stockholm and on location around the city.

== Synopsis ==
Believing that he has killed a man in a fight, Simon goes to take shelter with a religious group.

== Cast ==
- Gunnar Hellström as Simon Angus
- Ann-Marie Gyllenspetz as Rut Persson
- Stig Järrel as Reverend Rickman
- Einar Axelsson as Persson
- Åke Grönberg as Lund
- Marianne Löfgren as Mrs. Spalding
- Sven-Eric Gamble as Herbert
- Willy Peters as Journalist
- Ulla Sjöblom as Sick Girl
- Carl Ström as Mattsson
- Märta Dorff as Simon's Mother
- Olof Sandborg as Deaf Rock Blaster
- Olle Hilding as Believer
- Märta Arbin as Believer's Wife
- David Erikson as Member of Elder's Council
- Nils Ohlin as Member of Elder's Council
- Renée Björling as Woman Drinking Coffee
- Magnus Kesster as Editor
- Hans Sandberg as Biker
- Anders Andelius as Biker
- Siv Ericks as Woman Drinking Coffee
- Gösta Prüzelius as Policeman
- Jane Friedmann as Telephone Operator
- John Melin as Relief Seeker
- Carl-Axel Hallgren as Kantor
- Margit Andelius as Store Clerk
- Olga Appellöf as Mother seeking help
- Astrid Bodin as Woman in Square
- Arthur Fischer as Man with cigar
- Siegfried Fischer as Older Worker
- Svea Holst as Mrs. Spalding's Maid
- Axel Högel as Man standing in line
- Stig Johanson as Man in Square
- Sten Mattsson as Biker
- Georg Skarstedt as Older Worker
- Hugo Tranberg as Man with walking stick
- Måns Westfelt as Man with beret

== Bibliography ==
- Qvist, Per Olov & von Bagh, Peter. Guide to the Cinema of Sweden and Finland. Greenwood Publishing Group, 2000.
- Wright, Rochelle. The Visible Wall: Jews and Other Ethnic Outsiders in Swedish Film. SIU Press, 1998.
