= Raskenstam =

1983 Swedish film

- Directed by: Gunnar Hellström
- Written by: Birgitta Stenberg
- Starring: Gunnar Hellström
- Release date: 19 August 1983
- Running time: 109 minutes
- Country: Sweden
- Language: Swedish

Raskenstam is a 1983 Swedish comedy film directed by Gunnar Hellström. The film is based on the life of serial womanizer Gustaf Raskenstam (Anders Gustaf Eriksson), 1901–1969, who seduced more than 130 women for financial gain in the 1930s and 1940s and was sentenced to prison twice for fraud and theft.

The script was written by Birgitta Stenberg, who subsequently re-worked it into a novel with the same title. The film was criticised by some contemporary reviewers for showing events from Raskenstam's perspective and not empathising with his victims.

== Cast ==
- Gunnar Hellström as Gustaf Raskenstam
- Agnetha Fältskog as Lisa Mattsson
- Lena Nyman as Malla af Tidaholm
- Harriet Andersson as Cecilia Andersson
- Thomas Hellberg as Karl-Erik Almkvist
- Inga Gill as Anna-Greta Kjellgren
- Yvonne Lombard as Märta Olin
- Lis Nilheim as Agnes Bengtsson
- Birgitta Andersson as Maja Jansson
