= Widower Jarl =

1945 film

- Directed by: Sigurd Wallén
- Written by: Vilhelm Moberg; Sigurd Wallén
- Based on: Widower Jarl by Vilhelm Moberg
- Starring: Sigurd Wallén; Dagmar Ebbesen; Sven Magnusson; Ingrid Backlin
- Cinematography: Elner Åkesson
- Edited by: Wic Kjellin
- Music by: Erik Baumann; Nathan Görling
- Production company: Europa Film
- Distributed by: Europa Film
- Release date: 27 August 1945
- Running time: 97 minutes
- Country: Sweden
- Language: Swedish

Widower Jarl (Swedish: Änkeman Jarl) is a 1945 Swedish comedy film directed by Sigurd Wallén and starring Wallén, Dagmar Ebbesen, Sven Magnusson and Ingrid Backlin. It was shot at the Sundbyberg Studios in Stockholm with location shooting around Växjö and Tingsryd. The film's sets were designed by the art director Max Linder. It is based on the 1940 play Widower Jarl by Vilhelm Moberg.

== Synopsis ==
Andreas, a widowed Småland villager, is planning to get remarried to Gustava. His children oppose the marriage, fearing it may lose them their inheritance while a local shoemaker has designs on Gustava himself.

== Cast ==
- Sigurd Wallén as Andreas Jarl
- Dagmar Ebbesen as Gustava Hägg
- Arthur Fischer as Mandus
- Sven Magnusson as Albert
- Ingrid Backlin as Ellen
- Maritta Marke as Martina
- Carl Ström as Tradesman
- Lisskulla Jobs as Hilma
- Eivor Landström as Karin
- Rune Stylander as Edvin
- Birgitta Arman as Greta
- Helga Brofeldt as Gossip lady
- Ragnar Falck as Arvid
- Sigge Fürst as Olsson
- Ingemar Holde as Shop assistant
- Eva Stiberg as Blenda
- Lillie Wästfeldt as Old woman on bus

== Bibliography ==
- Krawc, Alfred. International Directory of Cinematographers, Set- and Costume Designers in Film: Denmark, Finland, Norway, Sweden (from the beginnings to 1984). Saur, 1986.
