= A Lion in Town =

1959 film

- Directed by: Gösta Folke
- Written by: Ivan Lebedeff; Volodja Semitjov; Rune Lindström; Gösta Folke
- Produced by: Lorens Marmstedt
- Starring: Nils Poppe; Ann-Marie Gyllenspetz; Herman Ahlsell
- Cinematography: Martin Bodin
- Edited by: Lennart Wallén
- Music by: Jerry Högstedt; Charles Redland
- Production company: Fontanafilm
- Distributed by: Fontanafilm
- Release date: 26 December 1959
- Running time: 101 minutes
- Country: Sweden
- Language: Swedish

A Lion in Town (Swedish: Lejon på stan) is a 1959 Swedish comedy film directed by Gösta Folke and starring Nils Poppe, Ann-Marie Gyllenspetz and Herman Ahlsell. It was shot at the Råsunda Studios in Stockholm. The film's sets were designed by the art director Rolf Boman.

== Cast ==
- Nils Poppe as Charlie
- Ann-Marie Gyllenspetz as Greta Berg
- Herman Ahlsell as Carl-Adam Pettersson
- Jan-Erik Lindqvist as Valdemar 'Walle' Blom
- Sigge Fürst as Supt. Vogel
- Olof Thunberg as Mayor
- Git Gay as Astrid Johansson
- Hugo Björne as Editor
- Åke Fridell as Circus Director
- Toivo Pawlo as Barker
- Hilding Rolin as Morelli
- Gunnar Olsson as Pawn Broker
- Ragnar Arvedson as Nisse aka Fakir Ali Akbar
- Curt Löwgren as Roffe
- Gösta Prüzelius as Police Officer
- Gunnar Nielsen as Police Officer
- Peter Thelin as Janne
- John Norrman as Fisherman
- Mona Geijer-Falkner as Sales Woman
- Sven Holmberg as Police Officer
- Svea Holst as Sales Woman
- Dagny Lind as Burgomaster's Wife

== Bibliography ==
- Qvist, Per Olov & von Bagh, Peter. Guide to the Cinema of Sweden and Finland. Greenwood Publishing Group, 2000.
