= A Little Nest =

1956 film

- Directed by: Arne Mattsson
- Written by: Herbert Grevenius
- Based on: A Little Nest by Herbert Grevenius
- Starring: Maj-Britt Nilsson; Folke Sundquist; Edvin Adolphson
- Cinematography: Max Wilén
- Edited by: Lennart Arvidsson
- Music by: Jules Sylvain
- Production company: Nordisk Tonefilm
- Distributed by: Nordisk Tonefilm
- Release date: 30 January 1956
- Running time: 113 minutes
- Country: Sweden
- Language: Swedish

A Little Nest (Swedish: Litet bo) is a 1956 Swedish comedy film directed by Arne Mattsson and starring Maj-Britt Nilsson, Folke Sundquist and Edvin Adolphson. It was shot on location in Denmark. The film's sets were designed by the art director Bibi Lindström.

== Cast ==
- Maj-Britt Nilsson as Alva
- Folke Sundquist as Lennart Ljung
- Edvin Adolphson as Stor-Knutte
- Nils Hallberg as Hasse Berggren
- Siv Ericks as Emy
- Henny Moan as Li
- Douglas Håge as Staff Sergeant
- Preben Mahrt as Leo
- Stig Järrel as Director
- Malene Schwartz as Christl
- Sigge Fürst as Office Manager
- Marguerite Viby as Teacher
- Sven Magnusson as Man with motor boat
- Curt Löwgren as His friend
- Stig Johanson as Driver
- John Melin as Customer in shoe-store
- Birger Lensander as Hagström, janitor
- Carl-Gustaf Lindstedt as Nightwalker
- Yngve Nordwall as Man in auto repair shop
- Carl-Axel Elfving as Tram conductor

== Bibliography ==
- Qvist, Per Olov & von Bagh, Peter. Guide to the Cinema of Sweden and Finland. Greenwood Publishing Group, 2000.
