= John Melin =

Swedish actor

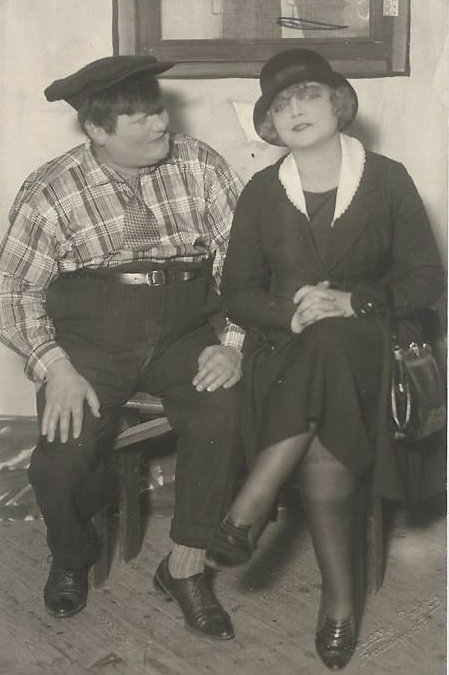
- Born: 18 May 1895; Karlskoga, Sweden
- Died: 6 April 1966 (aged 70); Stockholm, Sweden
- Occupation: Actor
- Years active: 1919-1964

John Melin (18 May 1895 – 6 April 1966) was a Swedish film actor. He appeared in more than 90 films between 1919 and 1964.

== Selected filmography ==
- The Ghost Baron (1927)
- The Queen of Pellagonia (1927)
- Sealed Lips (1927)
- The Devil and the Smalander (1927)
- Sin (1928)
- Frida's Songs (1930)
- Colourful Pages (1931)
- Ship Ahoy! (1931)
- Love and Deficit (1932)
- Jolly Musicians (1932)
- Saturday Nights (1933)
- Secret Svensson (1933)
- Fired (1934)
- The Atlantic Adventure (1934)
- The People of Högbogården (1939)
- Wanted (1939)
- Poor Ferdinand (1941)
- She Thought It Was Him (1943)
- In Darkest Smaland (1943)
- Crisis (1946)
- The People of Simlang Valley (1947)
- Loffe as a Millionaire (1948)
- Woman in White (1949)
- Dangerous Spring (1949)
- The Kiss on the Cruise (1950)
- The Saucepan Journey (1950)
- Knockout at the Breakfast Club (1950)
- The Motor Cavaliers (1950)
- The Quartet That Split Up (1950)
- A Ghost on Holiday (1951)
- Drömsemester (1952)
- The Clang of the Pick (1952)
- Say It with Flowers (1952)
- The Road to Klockrike (1953)
- Sju svarta be-hå (1954)
- Salka Valka (1954)
- Storm Over Tjurö (1954)
- Enchanted Walk (1954)
- Simon the Sinner (1954)
- Far och flyg (1955)
- The Summer Wind Blows (1955)
- The People of Hemsö (1955)
- A Little Nest (1956)
- Seventh Heaven (1956)
- The Girl in Tails (1956)
- Synnöve Solbakken (1957)
- Never in Your Life (1957)
- The Great Amateur (1958)
- The Lady in Black (1958)
- Rider in Blue (1959)
- Lovely Is the Summer Night (1961)
- Äktenskapsbrottaren (1964)
