= Live Dangerously =

1944 Swedish drama film

- Directed by: Lauritz Falk
- Written by: Lauritz Falk; Axel Kielland; Bengt Janzon
- Based on: Live Dangerously by Axel Kielland
- Starring: Lauritz Falk; Irma Christenson; Elof Ahrle; Stig Järrel
- Cinematography: Sten Dahlgren
- Edited by: Eric Nordemar
- Music by: Gunnar Sønstevold
- Production company: Svensk Talfilm
- Distributed by: Svensk Talfilm
- Release date: 3 April 1944
- Running time: 93 minutes
- Country: Sweden
- Language: Swedish

Live Dangerously ( Swedish: Lev farligt ) is a 1944 Swedish drama film directed by and starring Lauritz Falk and also featuring Irma Christenson, Elof Ahrle and Stig Järrel. The film's sets were designed by the art director Nils Nilsson. It was one of a number of Swedish films made at the time set in occupied foreign countries which made reference to German-occupied Europe during World War II.

== Cast ==
- Lauritz Falk as Iben Holt
- Irma Christenson as Inger Berg
- Elof Ahrle as Red Top
- Stig Järrel as Otto Frank
- Gunnar Björnstrand as Hahn
- Marianne Aminoff as Marion
- Ernst Eklund as Professor Fors
- Torsten Winge as Jacob
- Börje Mellvig as Dr. Fritz Lenner
- Rune Halvarsson as Johnny
- Olle Hilding as Olof
- Helge Mauritz as Train Engineer
- Erik Hell as Parachuting Saboteur
- Erik Strandmark as Corporal on the Train
- Holger Löwenadler as Train Engineer
- Sven Magnusson as Torsten
- Stig Olin as Parachuting Saboteur
- Mimi Nelson as Girl at Bar
- Birger Sahlberg as Gustav W. Tobiasson

== Bibliography ==
- Wright, Rochelle (1998). The Visible Wall: Jews and Other Ethnic Outsiders in Swedish Film. SIU Press. ISBN 978-91-554-4254-5. LCCN 99181244. OCLC 1484316825. OL 77881M. ARK ark:/13960/t88j0v78b.
