= Night Child (1956 film) =

1956 film

- Directed by: Gunnar Hellström
- Written by: Gunnar Hellström; Annastina Ek
- Produced by: Rune Waldekranz
- Starring: Gunnar Hellström; Harriet Andersson; Erik Strandmark; Nils Hallberg
- Cinematography: Sven Nykvist
- Edited by: Carl-Olov Skeppstedt
- Music by: Torbjörn Lundquist
- Production company: Sandrews
- Distributed by: Sandrew-Baumanfilm
- Release date: 27 August 1956
- Running time: 91 minutes
- Country: Sweden
- Language: Swedish

Night Child (Swedish: Nattbarn) is a 1956 Swedish crime drama film directed by Gunnar Hellström and starring Hellström, Harriet Andersson, Erik Strandmark and Nils Hallberg. It was shot at the Centrumateljéerna Studios in Stockholm. The film's sets were designed by the art director Nils Nilsson.

== Synopsis ==
A young man is paroled from prison and gets a good, stable job. However he is lured back into the criminal underworld of Stockholm.

== Cast ==
- Gunnar Hellström as Nils Gustaf Boman
- Harriet Andersson as Wivan
- Erik Strandmark as Leo Devell
- Nils Hallberg as Sven Harry Kallen
- Birgitta Olzon as Eva Rehn
- Sven-Eric Gamble as 'Count'
- Marianne Löfgren as Lätthammar
- Stig Järrel as Director Stenberg
- Märta Arbin as Nick's Mother
- Sven Almgren as Eva's Brother
- Bengt Eklund as Knotan
- Siv Ericks as Gittan
- Naemi Briese as Sonja
- Björn Berglund as Lithman
- Elsa Prawitz as Vera Gillman
- Åke Fridell as Eva's Father
- Ingrid Backlin as Eva's Mother
- Åke Claesson as Judge
- Olof Sandborg as Fritz
- Ragnar Sörman as Myran
- Margit Andelius as Mrs. André
- Axel Högel as Mollberg
- Peter Lindgren as Bruno
- Göthe Grefbo as Machine Operator
- Keve Hjelm as Berra
- Mona Åstrand as Barbro
- Ulla-Bella Fridh as Britt
- David Erikson as Supervisor
- Sven Holmberg as Maitre d'
- Elsa Ebbesen as Woman
- Georg Skarstedt as Night Watchman
- Per-Axel Arosenius as Plain-clothes Policeman
- Ulf Johansson as Plain-clothes Policeman
- Claes Thelander as Assistant Hair Dresser

== Bibliography ==
- Qvist, Per Olov & von Bagh, Peter. Guide to the Cinema of Sweden and Finland. Greenwood Publishing Group, 2000.
- Segrave, Kerry & Martin, Linda. The Continental Actress: European Film Stars of the Postwar Era--biographies, Criticism, Filmographies, Bibliographies. McFarland, 1990.
