= The Girl from Backafall =

1953 film

- Directed by: Bror Bügler
- Written by: Gabriel Jönsson (poem); Åke Ohlmarks
- Starring: Viola Sundberg; Sven Lindberg; Kenne Fant; Edvard Persson
- Cinematography: Ingvar Borild; Hilmer Ekdahl
- Edited by: Wic Kjellin
- Music by: Harry Arnold
- Production company: Europa Film
- Release date: 2 March 1953
- Running time: 90 minutes
- Country: Sweden
- Language: Swedish

The Girl from Backafall (Swedish: Flickan från Backafall) is a 1953 Swedish drama film directed by Bror Bügler and starring Viola Sundberg, Sven Lindberg and Kenne Fant. It is based on a poem by Gabriel Jönsson, which had been turned into a popular song in the 1920s, about the romance between a sailor and a woman on the island of Ven in the Baltic Sea.

The film's sets were designed by the art director Arne Åkermark.

== Cast ==
- Viola Sundberg as Ellen
- Sven Lindberg as Per
- Kenne Fant as Nils
- Edvard Persson as Silla-Sven
- Holger Löwenadler as August Larsson
- Märta Dorff as Mrs. Larsson
- Erik 'Bullen' Berglund as Captain Backe
- Dagmar Ebbesen as Mrs. Backe
- Olof Winnerstrand as Vicar
- Aurore Palmgren as Botilla
- Olav Riégo as Dücker
- Renée Björling as Mrs. Dücker
- Charles Gregmar as Robert Dücker
- Jan Molander as Hellberg
- Verner Edberg as Adolf
- Gösta Gustafson as Matts Shoemaker
- Lars Egge as Fredrik Åkerberg
- Anders Andelius as Sailor at 'Tre bröder'
- Margit Andelius as Mrs. Svensson
- Per Appelberg as Boy at shooting range
- Astrid Bodin as Dücker's cook
- Helga Brofeldt as Gossip
- Thure Carlman as Fisherman
- Harald Emanuelsson as Lasse, postman
- Kurt Friborn as Guest at Robert's party
- Leif Hedenberg as Boy at the dance
- John Larsson as Dücker's driver
- Monica Lindman
- Sven Magnusson as Fisherman
- Gull Natorp as Vicar's wife
- Carin Norberg as Vera, Ellen's friend
- Mim Persson as Guest at the coffee party
- Bellan Roos as Dücker's housewife
- Håkan Rylander as Woker
- Bengt Sundmark as Boy at the dance
- Gaby Svallner as Guest at Robert's party
- Carin Swensson as Farmer's wife
- Olle Teimert as Boy at shooting range
- Rudolf Wendbladh as Schultze, German captain
- Annalisa Wenström as Waitress
- Berit Örtengren as Girl at shooting range

== Bibliography ==
- Qvist, Per Olov & von Bagh, Peter. Guide to the Cinema of Sweden and Finland. Greenwood Publishing Group, 2000.
