= Interlude (1946 film) =

1942 film

- Directed by: Hasse Ekman
- Written by: Walter Ljungquist; Hasse Ekman
- Based on: I dödens väntrum by Sven Stolpe
- Produced by: Hasse Ekman; Lorens Marmstedt
- Starring: Viveca Lindfors; Hasse Ekman; Erik 'Bullen' Berglund
- Cinematography: Hilding Bladh
- Edited by: Lennart Wallén
- Music by: Lille Bror Söderlundh
- Production company: Terrafilm
- Distributed by: Terrafilm
- Release date: 11 February 1946
- Running time: 92 minutes
- Country: Sweden
- Language: Swedish

Interlude (Swedish: I dödens väntrum) is a 1946 Swedish drama film directed by Hasse Ekman and starring Viveca Lindfors, Hasse Ekman and Erik 'Bullen' Berglund.

The film's sets were designed by the art director Bibi Lindström.

== Cast ==
- Viveca Lindfors as Vellamo Toivonen
- Hasse Ekman as Vilhelm Canitz
- Erik 'Bullen' Berglund as Dr. Lautensack
- Stig Järrel as Martin Dahlberg
- Bengt Ekerot as Tjuven
- Ronald De Wolfe as Frank Graham
- Sven-Bertil Norberg as Defie
- Albert Gaubier as Dansören
- Juanita as Dansösen

== Bibliography ==
- Qvist, Per Olov & von Bagh, Peter. Guide to the Cinema of Sweden and Finland. Greenwood Publishing Group, 2000.
