= Say It with Flowers (1952 film) =

1952 Swedish comedy film

- Directed by: Lars-Eric Kjellgren
- Written by: Gösta Stevens
- Based on: Seeing Things by Margaret Mayo
- Produced by: Allan Ekelund
- Starring: Annalisa Ericson; Stig Järrel; Gunnar Björnstrand
- Cinematography: Martin Bodin
- Edited by: Oscar Rosander
- Music by: Eskil Eckert-Lundin
- Production company: Svensk Filmindustri
- Distributed by: Svensk Filmindustri
- Release date: 28 January 1952
- Running time: 77 minutes
- Country: Sweden
- Language: Swedish

Say It with Flowers (Swedish: Säg det med blommor) is a 1952 Swedish comedy film directed by Lars-Eric Kjellgren and starring Annalisa Ericson, Stig Järrel and Gunnar Björnstrand. It was shot at the Råsunda Studios in Stockholm. The film's sets were designed by the art director Nils Svenwall. It is based on the 1920 play Seeing Things by American writer Margaret Mayo.

== Cast ==
- Annalisa Ericson as Peggy
- Stig Järrel as Hasse aka Hans Nåd
- Gunnar Björnstrand as Oskar Blomkvist
- Naima Wifstrand as Mrs. Lagerberg
- Elisaveta as Gun Lagerberg
- Mimi Nelson as Monica
- Sif Ruud as Helena Blomkvist
- Elsa Ebbesen as Hulda
- Gunwer Bergkvist as 'Bojan'
- Karl-Arne Holmsten as Kirre
- Elof Ahrle as Karlsson
- Ragnar Klange as Police Captain
- Carl-Axel Elfving as Porter
- Magnus Kesster as Policeman
- Wiktor Andersson as Porter at Mosebacke
- Georg Adelly as Porter at Park Avenue Hotel
- Astrid Bodin as . Anna, bather
- Sven-Axel Carlsson as Bicyclist
- Gunnar Ekwall as Policeman
- Claes Falkenberg as Gentleman in the Katarina Elevator
- Anna-Lisa Fröberg as Oskar Blomkvist's secretary
- Gustaf Färingborg as Policeman
- Mary Gräber as Woman at the hairdresser's
- Ingemar Jacobsson as Policeman
- Solveig Lagström as Mrs. Blomkvist
- Arne Lindblad as Lady's hairdresser
- Yvonne Lombard as Greta, Peggy's friend
- Wilma Malmlöf as Lady in the Katarina Elevator
- Sten Mattsson as Bicyclist
- John Melin as Gentleman in the Katarina Elevator
- Sven-Bertil Norberg as Erik Holmer, Peggy's cousin
- Björn Näslund as Bicyclist
- Millan Olsson as Lady in the Katarina Elevator
- Hanny Schedin as Supervisor
- Tord Stål as Clerk at the radio
- Carla Wiberg as Bather

== Bibliography ==
- Qvist, Per Olov & von Bagh, Peter. Guide to the Cinema of Sweden and Finland. Greenwood Publishing Group, 2000.
