= Sven Magnusson =

Swedish actor

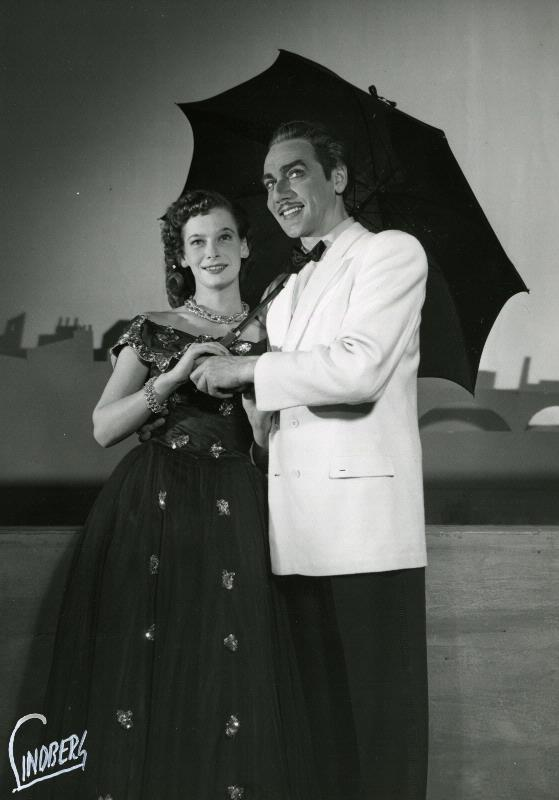
- Magnusson performing with Marianne Stjernqvist at the Helsingborg City Theatre in 1950.
- Born: 30 April 1908; Bollnäs, Sweden
- Died: 30 September 1962 (aged 54); Stockholm, Sweden
- Occupation: Actor
- Years active: 1930–1962 (film)

Sven Magnusson (30 April 1908 – 30 September 1962) was a Swedish stage and film actor. He appeared frequently at the Helsingborg City Theatre.

== Selected filmography ==
- Frida's Songs (1930)
- The Atlantic Adventure (1934)
- 65, 66 and I (1936)
- His Excellency (1944)
- En dag skall gry (1944)
- Live Dangerously (1944)
- The Forest Is Our Heritage (1944)
- Widower Jarl (1945)
- The Wedding on Solö (1946)
- Desire (1946)
- Rail Workers (1947)
- Realm of Man (1949)
- When Love Came to the Village (1950)
- Andersson's Kalle (1950)
- Stronger Than the Law (1951)
- A Ghost on Holiday (1951)
- Bom the Flyer (1952)
- Barabbas (1953)
- The Beat of Wings in the Night (1953)
- The Girl from Backafall (1953)
- Enchanted Walk (1954)
- Men in the Dark (1955)
- A Little Nest (1956)
- The Girl in Tails (1956)
- Ticket to Paradise (1962)

== Bibliography ==
- Nash, Jay Robert & Ross, Stanley Ralph. The Motion Picture Guide, Volume 6. Cinebooks, 1985.
