= Henrik S. Järrel =

Swedish television personality and former politician

Henrik Stefan Järrel (born 9 November 1948 in Stockholm) is a former member of the Riksdag (as a Moderate), a Swedish TV personality and media consultant. He is the son of the actors Ingrid Backlin and Stig Järrel.

He was the first director of programming of Nordic Channel, an upstart satellite television station, from 1989 to 1991, when he left the post to concentrate on his political career. Järrel has been a member of the Riksdag 1991–1994, and then again 1995–2006, as a politician of the Moderate Party. He is as of June 2006 in the committee of the Constitution. Järrel is a devout supporter of the Swedish monarchy and founded a royalist network in the Riksdag.
