= The Saucepan Journey =

1950 Swedish comedy film

- Directed by: Arne Mattsson
- Written by: Edith Unnerstad (novel); Börje Larsson
- Produced by: Lennart Landheim
- Starring: Eva Dahlbeck; Sigge Fürst; Edvin Adolphson
- Cinematography: Sven Thermænius
- Edited by: Lennart Wallén
- Music by: Gunnar Lundén-Welden; Charlie Norman
- Production company: Nordisk Tonefilm
- Distributed by: Nordisk Tonefilm
- Release date: 16 December 1950
- Running time: 81 minutes
- Country: Sweden
- Language: Swedish

The Saucepan Journey (Swedish: Kastrullresan) is a 1950 Swedish comedy family film directed by Arne Mattsson and starring Eva Dahlbeck, Sigge Fürst and Edvin Adolphson. The film is based on a novel by Edith Unnerstad, while Börje Larsson wrote the screenplay. The film's sets were designed by the art director Jan Boleslaw.

== Cast ==
- Eva Dahlbeck as Mamma Larsson
- Sigge Fürst as Per Ivar Patrik (PIP) Larsson
- Edvin Adolphson as Enoksson
- Sture Lagerwall as Vilfred Vågberg
- Olof Winnerstrand as Farbror Enok
- Julia Cæsar a sFröken Lur
- Lasse Sarri as Lasse Larsson
- Björn Berglund as Motorcykelpolis
- Ann Bornholm as Miranda (Mirre) Larsson
- Svea Holst as Fröken Eternell
- Ragnvi Lindbladh as Tant Bella
- Pär Lundin as Lilla O
- John Melin as Herr Sirius
- Inger Norberg as Rosalinda Larsson
- Birgitta Olzon as Desdemona (Dessi) Larsson
- Öyvind Serrander as Knutte Larsson
- Tom Walter as Svartis
- Birger Åsander as Lång-John
- Hans Lindgren as Sven
- Gunnar Lundin as Motorcykelpolis

== Bibliography ==
- Qvist, Per Olov & von Bagh, Peter. Guide to the Cinema of Sweden and Finland. Greenwood Publishing Group, 2000.
