= Yvonne Lombard =

Swedish actress

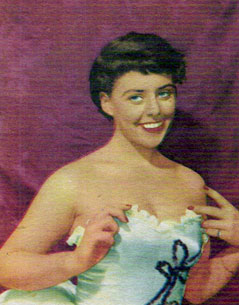
- Yvonne Lombard, circa 1955.
- Born: Yvonne Lombard; 28 May 1929 (age 96); Stockholm, Sweden
- Occupation: Actress
- Years active: 1950–present
- Spouse: Lennart Hellsing (m. 1953; died 2015)

Yvonne Lombard (born 28 May 1929) is a Swedish actress. Born in Stockholm, Lombard studied at the Royal Dramatic Theatre ("Dramaten") there, where she trained between 1948 and 1951 with the likes of Max von Sydow and Ingrid Thulin. She has performed in several films, television series and in the theatre. She is perhaps best known for her collaboration with director Ingmar Bergman in A Lesson in Love. She was married to author Lennart Hellsing from 1953 until his death in November 2015.

== Selected filmography ==
- Jack of Hearts (1950)
- Stronger Than the Law (1951)
- Encounter with Life (1952)
- Say It with Flowers (1952)
- Bom the Flyer (1952)
- Barabbas (1953)
- A Lesson in Love (1954)
- The Staffan Stolle Story (1956)
- The Halo Is Slipping (1957)
- The Koster Waltz (1958)
- More Than a Match for the Navy (1958)
- Summer and Sinners (1960)
- Äppelkriget (1971)
- Bang! (1977)
- Göta kanal eller Vem drog ur proppen? (1981)
- Raskenstam (1983)
- Rapport till himlen (1994) (TV miniseries)
- Lithivm (1998)
- The House (2022)
