= Sten Stensson Returns =

1963 film

- Directed by: Börje Larsson
- Written by: Rolf Botvid; Nils Poppe
- Produced by: Anna-Stina Hallgren
- Starring: Nils Poppe; Hjördis Petterson; John Norrman
- Cinematography: Curt Cronwall
- Edited by: Eric Nordemar
- Music by: Charles Redland
- Production company: Svensk Talfilm
- Distributed by: Svensk Talfilm
- Release date: 7 October 1963
- Running time: 79 minutes
- Country: Sweden
- Language: Swedish

Sten Stensson Returns (Swedish: Sten Stensson kommer tillbaka) is a 1963 Swedish comedy film directed by Börje Larsson and starring Nils Poppe, Hjördis Petterson and John Norrman. It was shot at the Täby Studios in Stockholm. The film's sets were designed by the art director Per-Olav Sivertzen-Falk. It was the fourth in a series of films featuring Poppe in the title role of Sten Stensson.

== Cast ==
- Nils Poppe as Sten Stensson Stéen
- Hjördis Petterson as Mrs. Agda
- John Norrman as Putte
- Claes Esphagen as Olsson
- Sten Lonnert as Rulle
- Carl-Axel Elfving as Nilsson
- Morgan Andersson as Monsieur
- Tage Severin as Police-Inspector Gunnar Boklund
- Lena Brundin as Karin
- Inga-Lill Åhström as Sten's mother
- Arthur Fischer as Sten's father
- Svea Holst as Lady at the bank
- Hilding Rolin as Supt. Fröberg
- Gert Landin as TV-host
- Sven Holmberg as Prof. Teodor Stark
- Manne Grünberger as TV-judge
- Lill Larsson as Prostitute
- Margareta Meyerson as Anna-Stina
- Irma Erixson as Young blonde girl
- Ena Carlborg as Young man
- Signe Stade as Young girl
- Anita Wall as Pregnant girl
- Gunnar Rosendal as Vicar
- Mona Geijer-Falkner as Elderly lady

== Bibliography ==
- Qvist, Per Olov & von Bagh, Peter. Guide to the Cinema of Sweden and Finland. Greenwood Publishing Group, 2000.
