= Woman in a Fur Coat =

1958 film

- Directed by: Jan Molander
- Written by: Jan Molander
- Produced by: Olle Brunaeus
- Starring: Harriet Andersson; Ulf Palme; Erik Strandmark
- Cinematography: Ingvar Borild; Bertil Palmgren
- Edited by: Lennart Wallén
- Music by: Harry Arnold
- Production company: Europa Film
- Distributed by: Europa Film
- Release date: 8 September 1958
- Running time: 100 minutes
- Country: Sweden
- Language: Swedish

Woman in a Fur Coat (Swedish: Kvinna i leopard) is a 1958 Swedish thriller film directed by Jan Molander and starring Harriet Andersson, Ulf Palme and Erik Strandmark. It was shot at the Sundbyberg Studios in Stockholm. The film's sets were designed by the art directors Bertil Duroj and Arne Åkermark.

== Synopsis ==
A woman who is unhappily married to a wealthy man has an affair with his doctor. Her husband had had a long ailment and she had been looking forward to his death. However, her husband makes a recovery. Wishing to rid herself of her husband, she plots to kill him with poison stolen from the doctor's surgery.

== Cast ==
- Harriet Andersson as Marianne
- Ulf Palme as Arvid Croneman
- Erik Strandmark as Lennart Hägg
- Sture Ström as Hans Lundin, Actor
- Renée Björling as Mathilde Croneman
- Georg Funkquist as Jörgen Bengtsson
- Siv Ericks as Birgitta
- Curt Masreliez as Curt
- Mona Malm as Anita
- Tekla Sjöblom as Mrs. Olsson
- Wiktor Andersson as Mr. Olsson
- Birgitta Andersson as Anna Högman
- Gösta Cederlund as Theater Agent
- Gunnar Olsson as Forensic Chemist
- Sven Holmberg as Police
- Carl-Axel Elfving as Waiter
- Curt Löwgren as Porter
- Sangrid Nerf as Young Woman at the Party
- Hanny Schedin as Cleaning Woman
- Carl-Gunnar Wingård as Party Guest

== Bibliography ==
- Qvist, Per Olov & von Bagh, Peter. Guide to the Cinema of Sweden and Finland. Greenwood Publishing Group, 2000.
