= The Judge (1960 film) =

1960 film

- Directed by: Alf Sjöberg
- Screenplay by: Alf Sjöberg
- Based on: Domaren by Vilhelm Moberg
- Produced by: Rune Waldekranz
- Starring: Ingrid Thulin
- Cinematography: Sven Nykvist
- Edited by: Lennart Wallén
- Release date: 14 October 1960
- Running time: 112 minutes
- Country: Sweden
- Language: Swedish

The Judge (Swedish: Domaren) is a 1960 Swedish drama film directed by Alf Sjöberg. It is based on the 1957 play Domaren by Vilhelm Moberg. It was entered into the 1961 Cannes Film Festival.

== Cast ==
- Ingrid Thulin as Brita Randel
- Gunnar Hellström as Albert Arnold, lawyer
- Per Myrberg as Krister Langton
- Georg Rydeberg as Edvard Cunning, judge
- Naima Wifstrand as Mrs. Wangendorff
- Ulf Palme as Psychiatrist
- Åke Lindström as Lanner, editor
- Elof Ahrle as Thorvald, editor
- Holger Löwenadler as Justice ombudsman
- Olof Widgren as Judge of the State Court
- Georg Årlin as Manager Randel
- Ingrid Borthen as Mrs. Randel
- Inga Gill as Waitress
- Hugo Björne as Mayor
- Herman Ahlsell as Chief of police
- Carl-Axel Elfving as Assistant
- Karl Erik Flens as Janitor (as Erik Flens)
- Siv Ericks as Secretary
