= Wandering with the Moon =

1945 film

Vandring med månen
- Original theatrical poster
- Directed by: Hasse Ekman
- Written by: Hasse Ekman, Walter Ljungquist
- Produced by: Svensk Filmindustri
- Starring: Eva Henning; Alf Kjellin; Stig Järrel
- Music by: Lille Bror Söderlundh
- Release date: 6 August 1945
- Running time: 105 minutes
- Country: Sweden
- Language: Swedish

Wandering with the Moon (Swedish: Vandring med månen) is a 1945 Swedish drama film directed by Hasse Ekman.

== Plot summary ==
A young man, Dan, leaves his home after a quarrel with his father. He starts to wander along the country road. During his walk he meets a travelling theatre company and falls in love with a young actress, Pia. Together they leave the theatre company, meeting a string of different people while they ponder over life and love together.

== Cast ==
- Eva Henning - Pia Serner, actress
- Alf Kjellin - Dan Killander
- Stig Järrel - The vagabonde
- Olof Molander - Fritz Diebolt, adventurer
- Hasse Ekman - Ernst Törsleff, Johannes' adoptive son
- Margit Manstad - Marie Ohdén, actress
- Karl-Arne Holmsten - Lieutenant Ekberg
- Marianne Löfgren - Valborg Snäckendal
- Sigge Fürst - Hugo Snäckendal
- Hjördis Petterson - Ms. Linda Fristedt
- Anna-Lisa Baude - Ms. Lola Oskarsson
- Hilding Gavle - Johannes Törsleff, vicar
- Douglas Håge - Alfredsson, driver
- Margot Ryding - Edit, Johannes' sister
- Signe Wirff - Tora, Johannes' sister
- Olle Hilding - Dan's father
