= Carl-Axel Elfving =

Swedish actor (1920–1988)

- Born: 12 January 1920; Örnsköldsvik, Sweden
- Died: 12 January 1988 (aged 68); Stockholm, Sweden
- Occupation: Actor
- Years active: 1947–1986

Carl-Axel Elfving (12 January 1920 – 12 January 1988) was a Swedish actor. He appeared in more than 70 films and television shows between 1947 and 1986.

== Selected filmography ==
- Don't Give Up (1947)
- Private Bom (1948)
- Teacher's First Born (1950)
- Knockout at the Breakfast Club (1950)
- A Ghost on Holiday (1951)
- Say It with Flowers (1952)
- Dance in the Smoke (1954)
- A Little Nest (1956)
- The Girl in Tails (1956)
- The Stranger from the Sky (1956)
- Encounters in the Twilight (1957)
- The Halo Is Slipping (1957)
- Bill Bergson Lives Dangerously (1957)
- Woman in a Fur Coat (1958)
- Åsa-Nisse in Military Uniform (1958)
- The Judge (1960)
- Lovely Is the Summer Night (1961)
- Hide and Seek (1963)
- Sten Stensson Returns (1963)
- Sailors (1964)
- Här kommer bärsärkarna (1965)
- The Reluctant Sadist (1967)
- Pistol (1973)
