= Poker (film) =

- Directed by: Gösta Bernhard
- Written by: Gösta Bernhard; Stig Järrel
- Starring: Stig Järrel; Kenne Fant; Ingrid Backlin
- Cinematography: Curt Jonsson
- Edited by: Lennart Wallén
- Music by: Olle Lindholm
- Production company: Centrumateljéerna
- Distributed by: Sandrew-Baumanfilm
- Release date: 12 November 1951
- Running time: 96 minutes
- Country: Sweden
- Language: Swedish

Poker is a 1951 Swedish drama film directed and co-written by Gösta Bernhard and starring Stig Järrel, Kenne Fant and Ingrid Backlin.

== Partial cast ==
- Stig Järrel as Mr. Alkeryd aka Spindeln
- Kenne Fant as Sven Bergström
- Ingrid Backlin as Mrs. Elsa Bergström
- Arne Källerud as 'Rövarn'
- Lars Ekborg as Pelle Axelsson
- Margaretha Löwler as Ingalill
- Björn Berglund as Wilkers

== Bibliography ==
- Alfred Krautz. International directory of cinematographers, set- and costume designers in film, Volume 5. Saur, 1986.
