= Siv Ericks =

Swedish actress (1918–2005)

- Born: Siv Gustava Eriksson; 31 July 1918; Oxelösund, Sweden
- Died: 3 July 2005 (aged 86); Onsala, Sweden
- Occupation: Actress
- Years active: 1934–1994
- Children: 1

Siv Ericks, real name Siv Gustava Essy-Ehsing (born Eriksson; 31 July 1918 in Oxelösund – 3 July 2005 in Onsala), was a Swedish actress who performed in 66 Swedish films over a 53-year career.

She made her stage debut at the age of eight in her father's local revue. At 16, she joined a touring theatre group. Ericks began her film career with a leading role in the 1939 film Rosor varje kväll. Her work for Swedish film director Ingmar Bergman was slight; one uncredited role in A Lesson in Love (En Lektion i kärlek) (1954) and a role that ended up on the cutting room floor (Kvinnodröm, aka Dreams and Journey Into Autumn, 1955). In 1982, however, in one of her final roles, she played Alida in Bergman's Fanny and Alexander (1982). She also had supporting roles in Pippi Longstocking (1969) and Pippi Goes on Board (1973). She had one son and died on 3 July 2005 in Onsala.

== Selected filmography ==
- Rosor varje kväll (1939) - Birgit Johansson
- Söderpojkar (1941) - Amy, Kalle's sister
- How to Tame a Real Man (1941) - Maud
- Poor Ferdinand (1941) - Karin Dellander
- Dangerous Ways (1942) - Green's Maid (uncredited)
- Morgondagens melodi (1942)
- Eviga länkar (1946) - Ms. Lindedahl - Customer (uncredited)
- Two Women (1947) - Maid (uncredited)
- The Night Watchman's Wife (1947) - Waitress (uncredited)
- Åsa-Nisse Goes Hunting (1950) - Greta
- I dur och skur (1953) - Gustafsson
- Sju svarta be-hå (1954) - Margareta Beckman
- A Lesson in Love (1954) - David's Patient (uncredited)
- Simon the Sinner (1954) - Woman Drinking Coffee
- The Yellow Squadron (1954) - Actress (uncredited)
- Uncle's (1955) - Sylvia
- Karusellen i fjällen (1955) - Mrs. Rosenkrans
- Dreams (1955) - Katja (scenes deleted)
- Den glade skomakaren (1955) - Blända Olsson
- Bröderna Östermans bravader (1955) - Fru Svensson
- Flicka i kasern (1955) - Edith
- A Little Nest (1956) - Emy
- Egen ingång (1956) - Olga, Wardrobe Attendant (uncredited)
- Seventh Heaven (1956) - Lovisas patient (uncredited)
- Night Child (1956) - Gittan
- The Staffan Stolle Story (1956) - Fröken Lefverhielm
- Lille Fridolf och jag (1956) - Mrs. Grillhagen
- Rasmus, Pontus och Toker (1956) - Gullan Persson
- The Biscuit (1956) - Mrs. Cecilia Braxenhielm
- The Halo Is Slipping (1957) - Ms. Svensson
- Bill Bergson Lives Dangerously (1957) - Mrs. Lisander
- Summer Place Wanted (1957) - Miss Svensson, Secretary (uncredited)
- You Are My Adventure (1958) - Marianne
- Woman in a Fur Coat (1958) - Birgitta
- Musik ombord (1958) - Växeltelefonist
- Enslingen i blåsväder (1959) - Astrid Lindqvist
- Fly mej en greve (1959) - Siv Sluggstedt
- 91:an Karlsson muckar (tror han) (1959) - Mrs. Morgonkröök
- Fridolfs farliga ålder (1959) - Mrs. Grillhagen
- Kärlekens decimaler (1960) - Lisa Bovell
- The Judge (1960) - Secretary
- Svenska Floyd (1961) - Carina
- En nolla för mycket (1962) - Kiddy Västerlund
- Svenska bilder (1964) - Miss Larsson
- Sailors (1964) - Mrs. Plunkett
- Äktenskapsbrottaren (1964) - Mrs. Plunkett
- Tre dar på luffen (1964) - Marietta Norén
- En sån strålande dag (1967) - Ms. 'Patsy' Patricia
- Pippi Longstocking (1969, TV Series) - Shop Assistant in Sweet Shop
- Pippi Meia-Longa (1969) - Shop Assistant in Sweet Shop
- Här kommer Pippi Långstrump (1969) - Candystore keeper in Visby
- Exponerad (1971) - Jan's Mother
- 47:an Löken (1971) - Mrs. Örkelljung
- Lockfågeln (1971) - Ulla Winbladh
- Vita Nejlikan (1974) - Medium
- Kom till Casino (1975)
- Maria (1975) - Woman at the Hairdresser
- Hello Baby (1976) - The Girl's Mother
- Lyftet (1978) - Karin's Mother
- Blomstrande tider (1980) - Gurli
- Flight of the Eagle (1982) - Mrs. Assarsson
- Fanny and Alexander (1982) - Alida - Ekdahlska huset
- T. Sventon praktiserande privatdetektiv (1989, TV Series) - Faster Agda
- Illusioner (1994) - Rut (final film role)
