= On a Bench in a Park =

1960 film

- Directed by: Hasse Ekman
- Written by: Hasse Ekman
- Produced by: Allan Ekelund
- Starring: Hasse Ekman; Sigge Fürst; Bengt Ekerot; Lena Granhagen
- Cinematography: Martin Bodin
- Edited by: Oscar Rosander
- Music by: Erik Nordgren
- Production company: Svensk Filmindustri
- Distributed by: Svensk Filmindustri
- Release date: 19 December 1960
- Running time: 103 minutes
- Country: Sweden
- Language: Swedish

On a Bench in a Park (Swedish: På en bänk i en park) is a 1960 Swedish thriller film written and directed by Hasse Ekman. He also stars, together with Sigge Fürst, Bengt Ekerot and Lena Granhagen. The film's sets were designed by the art director P.A. Lundgren. It was shot at the Råsunda Studios in Stockholm and on location around the city including at the Central Station and Vasa Theatre.

== Plot ==
Sam Persson, previously worked as a musician but has lived for several years in a mental hospital. When he is discharged he reads in the newspaper that his childhood friend Stig Brender has become a big name in the theatre.

Persson believes that Brender is the cause of all accidents that happen to him. He finds Brender at the Royal Theatre one evening and tries to kill him with a hammer; instead Persson himself falls to the floor, dead. Brender avoids calling the police, afraid of becoming a suspect; instead, he places the corpse on a bench in a park.

== Cast ==
- Hasse Ekman as Stig Brender, theatre manager
- Sigge Fürst as Envall, Police Inspector
- Bengt Ekerot as Sam Persson
- Lena Granhagen as Lena Vendel, Stig Brenders wife
- Ragnar Arvedson as Axel Forselius, actor
- Torsten Lilliecrona as Theater Director
- Olof Sandborg as Strandmark
- Fylgia Zadig as Mrs. Conelli
- Yngve Nordwall as Fris, Senior Lecturer
- Gertrud Danielsson as Mrs. Johansson
- John Norrman as Piss-Oskar
- Manne Grünberger as Mr. Victorin
- Eric Stolpe as Peddler
- Allan Edwall as Man at Restaurant
- Gunnar Olsson as Gustaf Andreas Wallin, Vicar
- Claes Esphagen as Dahlman
- Folke Asplund as Nicke
- Åke Wästersjö as Nicklasson
- Marrit Ohlsson as Luggage Expedition Lady
- Svea Holst as Luggage Expedition Lady
- Astrid Bodin as Berglärkan
- Kaj Nohrborg as Mac Norling
- Ragnar Klange as an actor
- Gösta Krantz as Sten
- Georg Skarstedt as Drunk at the Street

== Bibliography ==
- Gustafsson, Fredrik. The Man from the Third Row: Hasse Ekman, Swedish Cinema and the Long Shadow of Ingmar Bergman. Berghahn Books, 2016.
- Qvist, Per Olov & von Bagh, Peter. Guide to the Cinema of Sweden and Finland. Greenwood Publishing Group, 2000.
