= Stig Järrel =

Swedish actor

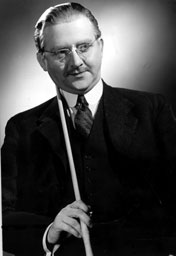
- Järrel as Caligula in Torment (1944).
- Born: Stig Karl Olof Ohlson; 8 February 1910; Malmberget, Sweden
- Died: 1 July 1998 (aged 88); Monte Carlo, Monaco
- Occupation: Actor
- Years active: 1935–1980
- Spouse(s): Karin Juel (m. 1937–1948) Ingrid Backlin (m. 1948–1960) Aase Krøyer (m. 1960–1998)

Stig Järrel (8 February 1910 – 1 July 1998) was a Swedish actor, film director and revue artist. Järrel was one of the most popular actors in Sweden during his career, and also one of the most productive, participating in a total of 131 films. He also performed as an actor at various Swedish theatres and was a frequent guest on radio and television.

== Biography ==
Stig Järrel was born Stig Ohlson in Malmberget in northern Sweden on 8 February 1910. In 1929, he was admitted as a drama student at the Royal Dramatic Theatre's Royal Dramatic Training Academy in Stockholm, and worked later for actor Gösta Ekman. He made his debut in a 1936 film with actor Edvard Persson called Larsson i det andra giftet. Järrel was notably productive with an average participation of six films per year (often appearing in large supporting roles or leading ones), making a total of 131 film roles during his career.

He is best remembered for his portrayal of the cruel Latin teacher 'Caligula' in the Alf Sjöberg film Torment (1944). Järrel later said that his portrayal of Caligula was his only film role of which he could say he was proud. Known as a self-imposed perfectionist among colleagues, he was otherwise in his native Sweden above all recognized as a magnificent comedian and revue artist on stage. Most of his parts on film are comedy parts as well. His most popular screen comedy part is probably his Little Märta in Hasse Ekman's 1945 film comedy Fram för lilla Märta, in which Järrel poses as a woman in the Swedish parliament. His son with the actress Ingrid Backlin, Henrik S. Järrel, was later himself a member of Parliament.

He worked with the leading revue producers in Sweden, and in one show developed the much popular character Fibban Karlsson, a choleric old man who reflected on the everyday life in monologues in his own little ways. Järrel retired in the 1980s and moved to the French Riviera. He died in Monte Carlo, Monaco, on 1 July 1998.

== Selected filmography ==
- Walpurgis Night (1935)
- Raggen (1936)
- Conscientious Objector Adolf (1936)
- Happy Vestköping (1937)
- The Two of Us (1939)
- Hanna in Society (1940)
- Med dej i mina armar (1940)
- A Real Man (1940)
- Her Melody (1940)
- The Three of Us (1940)
- Fröken Vildkatt (1941)
- How to Tame a Real Man (1941)
- Life Goes On (1941)
- Första divisionen (1941)
- The Poor Millionaire (1941)
- Flames in the Dark (1942)
- Som du vill ha mej (1943)
- Gentleman with a Briefcase (1943)
- There's a Fire Burning (1943)
- Mister Collins' Adventure (1943)
- Torment (1944)
- Som folk är mest (1944)
- I Am Fire and Air (1944)
- The Girl and the Devil (1944)
- Live Dangerously (1944)
- His Excellency (1944)
- The Invisible Wall (1944)
- Fram för lilla Märta (1945)
- Oss tjuvar emellan eller En burk ananas (1945)
- Vandring med månen (1945)
- Affairs of a Model (1946)
- Peggy on a Spree (1946)
- Incorrigible (1946)
- While the Door Was Locked (1946)
- Interlude (1946)
- Maria (1947)
- The Loveliest Thing on Earth (1947)
- The Sixth Commandment (1947)
- Don't Give Up (1947)
- The Bride Came Through the Ceiling (1947)
- Lilla Märta kommer tillbaka (1948)
- Each to His Own Way (1948)
- Sin (1948)
- The Devil and the Smalander (1949)
- The Street (1949)
- Fiancée for Hire (1950)
- The Motor Cavaliers (1950)
- Two Stories Up (1950)
- The White Cat (1950)
- When Love Came to the Village (1950)
- Perhaps a Gentleman (1950)
- Poker (1951)
- A Ghost on Holiday (1951)
- One Fiancée at a Time (1952)
- The Green Lift (1952)
- Say It with Flowers (1952)
- Kalle Karlsson of Jularbo (1952)
- Defiance (1952)
- The Road to Klockrike (1953)
- Speed Fever (1953)
- Resan till dej (1953)
- Dance in the Smoke (1954)
- Café Lunchrasten (1954)
- Simon the Sinner (1954)
- Paradise (1955)
- Seventh Heaven (1956)
- Rasmus, Pontus och Toker (1956)
- Rätten att älska (1956)
- Night Child (1956)
- A Little Nest (1956)
- Mother Takes a Vacation (1957)
- Never in Your Life (1957)
- The Halo Is Slipping (1957)
- Heaven and Pancake (1959)
- The Devil's Eye (1960)
- Lovely Is the Summer Night (1961)
- Ticket to Paradise (1962)
