= Karin Juel =

Swedish singer, actor, and writer

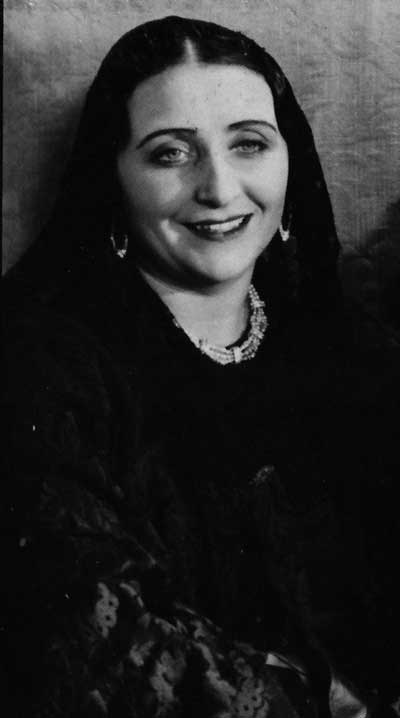
Karin Juel, circa 1940.

Karin Juel (26 May 1900 – 2 May 1976) was a Swedish singer, actor and writer, born in Kungsholmen, Stockholm. She originally wrote novels under the pseudonym Katherind van Goeben. She died in Stockholm.

== Filmography ==
- Bachelor Father (1935)
- We have heard ... (1946)
- Boy in the Tree (1961)
