= Sven Lindberg =

Swedish actor

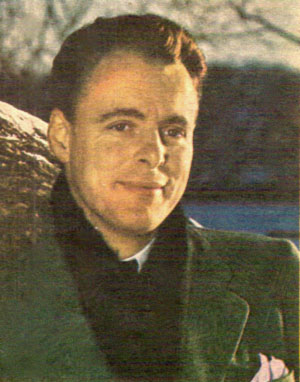
- Sven Lindberg in 1955
- Born: Sven Karlsson Lindberg; 20 November 1918; Stockholm, Sweden
- Died: 25 December 2006 (aged 88); Stockholm, Sweden
- Occupation: Actor
- Years active: 1943–2005
- Spouses: Ulla Waller (m. 1943–1973) Marianne von Baumgarten (m. 1977–2006)

Sven Lindberg (20 November 1918 – 25 December 2006) was a Swedish film actor and director. He was born and died in Stockholm, Sweden. At the 29th Guldbagge Awards he won the award for Best Actor for the film Spring of Joy.

== Selected filmography ==
- Gentleman with a Briefcase (1943)
- We Need Each Other (1944)
- Black Roses (1945)
- The Serious Game (1945)
- Tired Theodore (1945)
- One Swallow Does Not Make a Summer (1947)
- Banketten (1948)
- Music in Darkness (1948)
- A Swedish Tiger (1948)
- Flickan från tredje raden (1949)
- When Love Came to the Village (1950)
- Teacher's First Born (1950)
- Two Stories Up (1950)
- The Quartet That Split Up (1950)
- The Kiss on the Cruise (1950)
- Knockout at the Breakfast Club (1950)
- My Friend Oscar (1951)
- The Nuthouse (1951)
- Resan till dej (1953)
- Speed Fever (1953)
- Hidden in the Fog (1953)
- The Girl from Backafall (1953)
- The Yellow Squadron (1954)
- Dreams (1955)
- Men in the Dark (1955)
- Whoops! (1955)
- Musik ombord (1958)
- The Koster Waltz (1958)
- The Lady in Black (1958)
- Swinging at the Castle (1959)
- The Beloved Game (1959)
- The Die Is Cast (1960)
- Hide and Seek (1963)
- Äktenskapsbrottaren (1964)
- Nightmare (1965)
- Niklasons (1965)
- Face to Face (1976)
- The Adventures of Picasso (1978)
- Spring of Joy (1993)
