= Hilda Borgström =

Swedish actress (1871–1953)

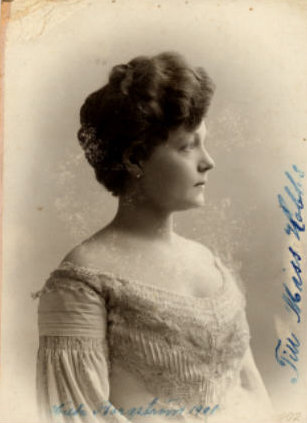
- Borgström in 1901
- Born: Hilda Teresia Borgström; 13 October 1871; Stockholm, Sweden
- Died: 2 January 1953 (aged 81); Stockholm, Sweden
- Occupation: Actress
- Years active: 1890–1951

Hilda Teresia Borgström (13 October 1871 – 2 January 1953) was a Swedish stage and film actress.

== Biography ==
Born in 1871 in Stockholm, Borgström made her film debut in 1912. She starred in leading parts in Victor Sjöström's silent films Ingeborg Holm (aka Margaret Day) (1913) and Körkarlen (aka The Phantom Carriage/The Stroke of Midnight/Thy Soul Shall Bear Witness) in 1921. Borgström started out to be a dancer and trained at the old Royal Theatre's ballet school in Stockholm 1880–1887. Later she decided to turn to the theatre instead and studied drama. Her professional debut on stage came in 1890 at one of Albert Ranft's theatres. She was an actress of Sweden's national stage, the Royal Dramatic Theatre, between 1900 and 1912 and 1920 and 1938.

She retired from the stage in 1938 because of stage fright and returned to film. She appeared in several supporting parts in Swedish films in the 1930s to the 1950s, for example in Ingmar Bergman's early 1948 film Music in Darkness, in the thriller Ett brott (A Crime) (1940) and in The Emperor of Portugallia (1944), based on the novel by Selma Lagerlöf, and in a pair of films by Hasse Ekman such as Kungliga patrasket (The Royal Rabble) (1945) and Flickan från tredje raden (The Girl from the Third Row) (1949). Borgström was also a teacher in the performing arts at the Royal Dramatic Theatre's acting school, Royal Dramatic Training Academy, in the 1930s and 1940s. Altogether she played some 80 parts on film.

She is today perhaps primarily known as the narrator in the short film Tomten – en vintersaga (The Tomte – A Winter's Tale) (1941), where she reads the poem Tomten by Viktor Rydberg. The film is shown at Christmas Eve every year on Swedish television.

She was awarded the Litteris et artibus medal in 1906. In 1925, she became a member of Nya Idun, a women's association.

She died in Stockholm on 2 January 1953 and is buried in Norra begravningsplatsen.

== Partial filmography ==
- A Ruined Life (1912)
- Lady Marions sommarflirt (1913)
- Ingeborg Holm (Margaret Day) (1913)
- Judge Not (1914)
- The Phantom Carriage (1921)
- Anna-Clara and Her Brothers (1923)
- Flickan från Paradiset (The Girl From Paradise) (1924)
- The Lady of the Camellias (1925)
- Getting Married (1926)
- The Poetry of Ådalen (1928)
- The Realm of the Rye (1929)
- The People of Norrland (1930)
- What Do Men Know? (1933)
- Simon of Backabo (1934)
- John Ericsson, Victor of Hampton Roads (1937)
- The Andersson Family (1937)
- A Woman's Face (1938)
- The People of Högbogården (1939)
- A Crime (1940)
- Her Melody (1940)
- The Fight Continues (1941)
- Goransson's Boy (1941)
- Dunungen (1941)
- Fransson the Terrible (1941)
- Flames in the Dark (1941)
- Ride Tonight! (1942)
- Dangerous Ways (1942)
- Doctor Glas (1942)
- Livet måste levas (Life must be lived) (1943)
- Imprisoned Women (1943)
- A Girl for Me (1943)
- I Killed (1943)
- En dag skall gry (One day dawning) (1944)
- Torment (1944)
- I Am Fire and Air (1944)
- The Girl and the Devil (1944)
- The Emperor of Portugallia (1944)
- Prince Gustaf (1944)
- Appassionata (1944)
- The Old Clock at Ronneberga (1944)
- The Invisible Wall (1944)
- Kungliga patrasket (The Royal Rabble) (1945)
- Tired Theodore (1945)
- The Gallows Man (1945)
- Brita in the Merchant's House (1946)
- Desire (1946)
- Sunshine Follows Rain (1946)
- Between Brothers (1946)
- The Key and the Ring (1947)
- Song of Stockholm (1947)
- Dynamite (1947)
- Music in Darkness (1948)
- Sin (1948)
- Sunshine (1948)
- Each to His Own Way (1948)
- Each Heart Has Its Own Story (1948)
- Banketten (The Banquet) (1948)
- Eva (1948)
- The Girl from the Third Row (1949)
- The Nuthouse (1951) (archive footage)
