= Seventh Heaven (1956 film) =

1956 film

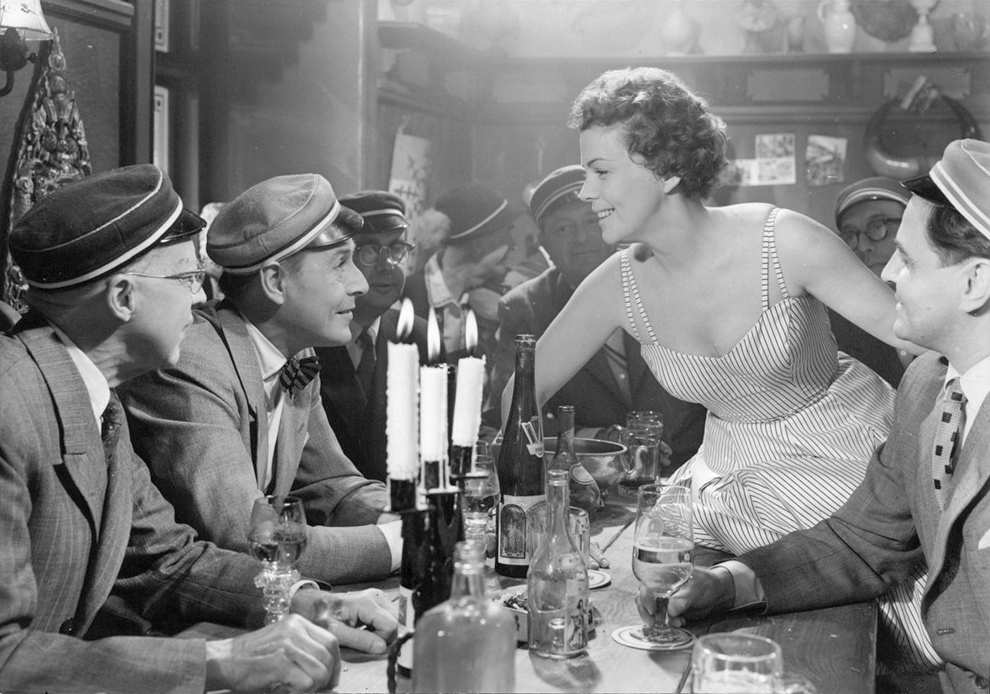
- Still with Hasse Ekman and Sickan Carlsson
- Directed by: Hasse Ekman
- Written by: Hasse Ekman
- Produced by: Allan Ekelund
- Starring: Sickan Carlsson; Hasse Ekman; Gunnar Björnstrand
- Cinematography: Åke Dahlqvist
- Edited by: Oscar Rosander
- Music by: Jerry Högstedt
- Production company: Svensk Filmindustri
- Distributed by: Svensk Filmindustri
- Release date: 11 June 1956
- Running time: 92 minutes
- Country: Sweden
- Language: Swedish

Seventh Heaven (Swedish: Sjunde himlen) is a 1956 Swedish comedy film directed by Hasse Ekman and starring Sickan Carlsson, Ekman and Gunnar Björnstrand. It was shot at the Råsunda Studios in Stockholm. The film's sets were designed by the art director P.A. Lundgren. It was followed by a sequel Heaven and Pancake in 1959.

== Plot summary ==
Willy Lorens is a successful radio idol with the hit series "Seventh Heaven". But the amount of fan mail and attention eventually becomes too much for Lorens, who suffers a minor collapse. He is taken to hospital where he meets Dr. Lovisa Sundelius, virtually the only woman in Sweden who does not admire the radio idol. In fact she despises him.

Since the program still has to air, according to the radio company, Lorens gets a vitamin injection and gets to broadcast the program from his hospital bed. Dr. Sundelius checks upon her patient, and to help him she improvise a part in the show, but does it too wildly. The next day, the newspapers headlines write about the embarrassing blunder.

To get away from it all, Willy Lorens buys a bus ticket for a trip through Europe with Italy as the destination, but it just so happens that Lovisa Sundelius also has a ticket for that same bus ride. Along for the ride is also Lovisa Sundelius' incredibly dull fiancé...

== Cast ==
- Sickan Carlsson as Lovisa Sundelius, doctor
- Hasse Ekman as Willy "Etershejken" Lorens, radio show host
- Gunnar Björnstrand as squadron-leader Ernst C:son Kruuse, Lovisas fiancé
- Stig Järrel as Sture Turesson, radio producer
- Sigge Fürst as radio writer
- Inga Gill as Miss Jonasson, singer
- Torsten Winge as Torsten Tidström, watchmaker
- Gunnar Sjöberg as father Bernhard Svanström, priest
- Bellan Roos as Inez, Lovisas housekeeper
- Doreen Denning as Lisa Brattström, travel guide
- Solveig Svensson as Miss Jonasson, singer
- Ulla-Britt Svensson as Miss Jonasson, singer
- Alexander von Baumgarten as Nattklubbsägare
- Gunnel Wadner as Sjuksyster
- Astrid Bodin as Beundrarinna
- Helga Brofeldt as Beundrarinna
- Elsa Ebbesen as Översköterskan
- Lars Egge as Svenske ambassadören
- Siv Ericks as Lovisas patient
- Mona Geijer-Falkner as Beundrarinna
- Erna Groth as Blenda från Kujala
- Lars Kåge as Liljekvist
- Stig Olin as Berättarröst
- John Melin as Ballongförsäljare
- Hanny Schedin as Fru Andersson
- Agda Helin as Beundrarinna

== Bibliography ==
- Iverson, Gunnar, Soderbergh Widding, Astrid & Soila, Tytti. Nordic National Cinemas. Routledge, 2005.
- Qvist, Per Olov & von Bagh, Peter. Guide to the Cinema of Sweden and Finland. Greenwood Publishing Group, 2000.
