= Kärlekens decimaler =

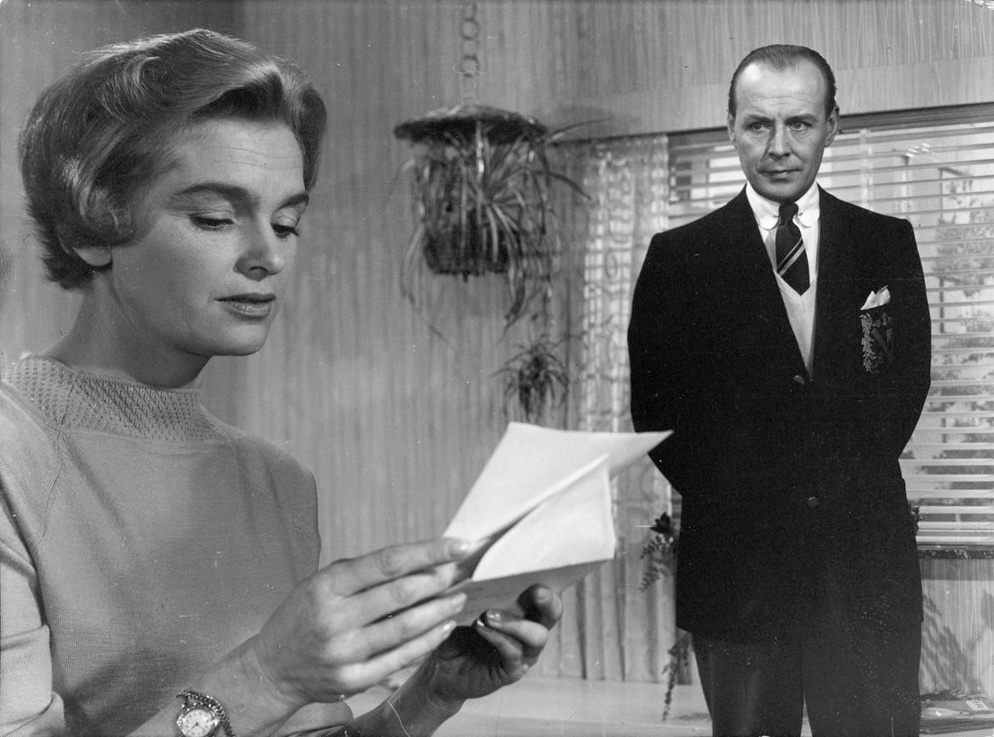
- Still from the film
- Directed by: Hasse Ekman
- Written by: Hasse Ekman, Gösta Gustaf-Janson
- Produced by: Svensk Filmindustri
- Starring: Hasse Ekman; Eva Henning; Stig Järrel; Eva Dahlbeck
- Release date: 12 September 1960
- Running time: 109 minutes
- Country: Sweden
- Language: Swedish

Kärlekens decimaler (English: Love decimals) is a 1960 Swedish drama film directed by Hasse Ekman.

== Cast ==
- Hasse Ekman as Charlie Gedelius
- Eva Henning as Lena Lind
- Stig Järrel as Nils Fähger
- Eva Dahlbeck as Astrid, Charlies sister
- Christina Schollin as Barbro "Barran" Bovell
- Lennart Klefbom as Staffan Fähger
- Siv Ericks as Lisa Bovell, Barrans mother
- Sigge Fürst as Malte Bovell, Barrans father
- Åke Fridells as Edgar Temmelin
- Asbjørn Andersen as Dr. Thiess
- Renée Björling as Mrs. Lind, Lenas mother
- Margareta Blytgen as Petersen, a housekeeper
