= Gösta Prüzelius =

Swedish actor (1922–2000)

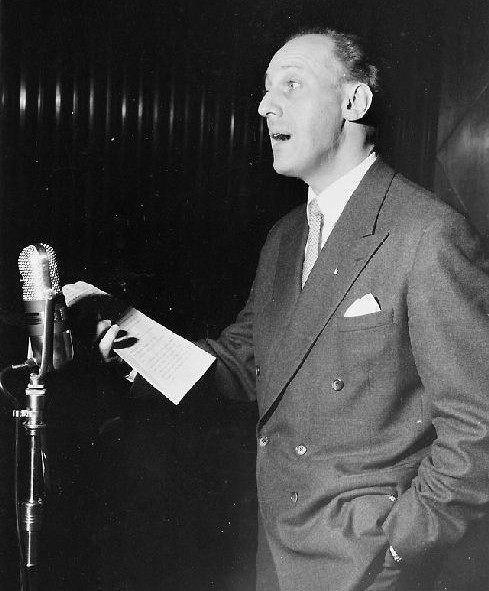
- Gösta Prüzelius 1956
- Born: Karl Gösta Prüzelius; 11 August 1922; Stockholm, Sweden
- Died: May 15, 2000 (aged 77); Stockholm, Sweden
- Occupation: Actor
- Years active: 1945–2000
- Spouse: Eva Margareta Prüzelius (m. 1948)

Karl Gösta Prüzelius (11 August 1922 – 15 May 2000) was a Swedish actor. His first film part was in the 1945 film Flickorna i Småland. He played in films as diverse as Summer with Monika, Space Invasion of Lapland, Fanny and Alexander, and Ingmar Bergman's film version of The Magic Flute (1975). He also provided the Swedish voice for Bagheera in Disney's The Jungle Book (1967), and played the policeman Klöverhage in a number of the Åsa-Nisse films.

Gösta Prüzelius worked at Sweden's Royal Dramatic Theatre in Stockholm from 1964 and for more than 30 years.

On television, Gösta Prüzelius starred in the long-running soap opera Rederiet, where he played the main character, shipping company owner Reidar Dahlén, from the series' start in 1992 until his death.

== Selected filmography ==
- The Girls in Smaland (1945) - Agronomist
- Åsa-Hanna (1946) - Magnus Pettersson
- Johansson and Vestman (1946) - Lieutenant (uncredited)
- It Rains on Our Love (1946) - Police constable (uncredited)
- Iris and the Lieutenant (1946) - Officer (uncredited)
- Tösen från Stormyrtorpet (1947) - Young man at the dance (uncredited)
- Loffe the Tramp (1948) - Police Officer
- Jungfrun på Jungfrusund (1949) - Lt. Bo Tillgren
- Love Wins Out (1949) - Red Cross-worker (uncredited)
- Bohus Battalion (1949) - Kurt Kronborg
- Kvartetten som sprängdes (1950) - Photographer (scenes deleted)
- Beef and the Banana (1951) - Tage Wendel
- Sköna Helena (1951) - Guest (uncredited)
- Han glömde henne aldrig (1952) - Tore (uncredited)
- Summer with Monika (1953) - Försäljare hos Forsbergs
- Barabbas (1953) - Member of Barabbas' Gang (uncredited)
- Kungen av Dalarna (1953) - Historic expert (uncredited)
- The Chieftain of Göinge (1953) - Mårten (uncredited)
- Aldrig med min kofot eller... Drömtjuven (1954) - Lind
- Seger i mörker (1954) - Engineer Gyllsdorf
- A Lesson in Love (1954) - Ticket Inspector in Train (uncredited)
- Simon the Sinner (1954) - Policeman
- The Yellow Squadron (1954) - Drunk (uncredited)
- Herr Arnes penningar (1954) - Courier
- The Dance Hall (1955) - Rolf Svensson
- Dreams (1955) - Man on the train (scenes deleted)
- Whoops! (1955) - Custom Official
- Åsa-Nisse ordnar allt (1955) - Klöverhage
- Violence (1955) - District attorney
- The Unicorn (1955)- Officer at the ball (uncredited)
- Paradise (1955) - Member of sobriety organization
- Smiles of a Summer Night (1955) - Servant (uncredited)
- Laughing in the Sunshine (1956) - Man
- Rätten att älska (1956) - Parent
- The Stranger from the Sky (1956) - Mr. Wahlström, newlywed couple
- På heder och skoj (1956) - August Persson
- Girls Without Rooms (1956) - Berndtsen
- Åsa-Nisse flyger i luften (1956) - Constable
- The Staffan Stolle Story (1956) - Badföreståndare (uncredited)
- When the Mills are Running (1956) - Sidenius
- The Seventh Seal (1957) - Man
- Som man bäddar... (1957) - Customs Officer
- The Halo Is Slipping (1957) - Maitre d' (uncredited)
- 91:an Karlsson slår knockout (1957) - Doctor
- Klarar Bananen Biffen? (1957) - Dr. Werner (uncredited)
- Åsa-Nisse i full fart (1957) - Constable Klöverhage
- A Guest in His Own House (1957) - Doctor (uncredited)
- Night Light (1957) - Pettersson
- Enslingen Johannes (1957) - Producer
- The Jazz Boy (1958) - Journalfilmsklipparen
- Line Six (1958) - Office manager
- Miss April (1958) - Policeman (uncredited)
- Guldgrävarna (1959) - Gang Leader
- Fröken Chic (1959) - Dr. Klewerud (uncredited)
- Enslingen i blåsväder (1959) - Roth
- Space Invasion of Lapland (1959) - Dr. Walter Ullman
- Fridolfs farliga ålder (1959) - Dr. Privén
- Bara en kypare (1959) - Ritz Personnel Manager (uncredited)
- Heaven and Pancake (1959)- Banana Boat Captain (uncredited)
- Sängkammartjuven (1959) - Police inspector (uncredited)
- A Lion in Town (1959) - Police Officer
- Åsa-Nisse as a Policeman (1960) - Klöverhage
- En nolla för mycket (1962) - Georg Berg
- All These Women (1964) - Swedish Radio Reporter (uncredited)
- Hej du glada sommar!!! (1965) - Georg Brander
- Ön (1966) - Berg
- Träfracken (1966) - Melander
- Adamsson i Sverige (1966) - Sergeant Major
- Sarons ros och gubbarna i Knohult (1968) - Klöverhage (uncredited)
- Shame (1968) - Kyrkoherden i förhörslokalen
- Freddy klarar biffen (1968) - Manfred Marsing
- Fanny Hill (1968) - Stig Boman, Rogers father
- Miss and Mrs Sweden (1969) - Randberg (uncredited)
- Skräcken har 1000 ögon (1970) - Leif, Doctor
- Klara Lust (1972) - Helge's Father
- Around the World with Fanny Hill (1974) - Fanny's Lawyer
- Vita Nejlikan (1974) - Policeman
- Rännstensungar (1974) - Manager Högstrand
- The Magic Flute (1975, TV Movie) - Första prästen
- Face to Face (1976)
- Summer Paradise (1977) - Carl-Henrik
- 91:an och generalernas fnatt (1977) - Col. Gyllenskalp
- Man måste ju leva... (1978) - Managing Director
- Charlotte Löwensköld (1979) - Organist Sundler
- Flygnivå 450 (1980) - Pyrro
- To Be a Millionaire (1980) - Bertil
- Der Mann, der sich in Luft auflöste (1980) - Hammar
- Fanny and Alexander (1982) - Doctor Fürstenberg - Ekdahlska huset
- Raskenstam (1983) - Doctor
- The Best Intentions (1992) - Länsman
