= En dag i oktober =

1931 novel by Sigurd Hoel

En dag i oktober (eng: One day in October) is a novel by Norwegian writer Sigurd Hoel, published in 1931.

The novel takes place in one day, 10 October, in an apartment building on St. Hanshaugen in Oslo. The novel describes the life of the inhabitants. It is, according to the Norwegian literary historian Philip Houm inspired by the American writer Elmer Rice's Street Scene in the use of time and place unit. Houm writes that "form suited to the task Hoel had undertaken. Making a quick and satirical cut through the contemporary bourgeois life, especially married life."

The frame in form of time and place is only broken by one of the pairs, and these become a sort of main characters. Already in the introductory chapter the young divorced Tordis Ravn is presented, she rents a room in the house. Her neighbours judge her for what seems, in their eyes, to be an immoral life and this make them furious. Tordis Ravns nervous breakdown also causes an uproar in the building. Tordis former husband, Dr. Ravn, is a detached scientist, who betrays his wife and their love, because he did not dare to totally commit. However, this is something he will have reason to regret.

The novel was adapted for the screen in Sweden in 1956 as Egen ingång, directed by Hasse Ekman and scripted by Ekman and Hoel.
