= Fam Ekman =

Swedish-Norwegian children's writer and illustrator

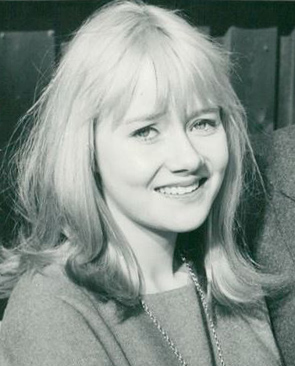
- Ekman in 1963
- Born: Fam Kristina Ekman; 6 October 1946 (age 79); Stockholm, Sweden
- Occupations: Children's writer, illustrator
- Notable work: Hva skal vi gjøre med lille Jill? Kall meg onkel Alf
- Parent(s): Hasse Ekman; Eva Henning
- Relatives: Gösta Ekman (grandfather); Gösta Ekman (half brother)

Fam Kristina Ekman (born 6 October 1946) is a Swedish-Norwegian children's writer and illustrator.

== Early life ==
She was born in Stockholm, Sweden, to actors Hasse Ekman and Eva Henning, and moved to Oslo in 1954.

== Career ==
She made her literary début in 1969 with Det kan hända. Her literary breakthrough was Hva skal vi gjøre med lille Jill? from 1976. She was awarded the Norwegian Critics Prize for the year's best children's or youth's literature in 2007, for Kall meg onkel Alf.

She has received several prizes for her art work, and is represented in the Norwegian National Museum of Art, Architecture and Design.

== Notable works ==
- Hva skal vi gjøre med lille Jill?
- Kall meg onkel Alf

== Awards ==
- Brage Prize 1992
- Norwegian Critics Prize for the year's best children's or youth's literature 2007
