= The Girl from the Third Row =

1949 film

- Directed by: Hasse Ekman
- Written by: Hasse Ekman
- Produced by: Lorens Marmstedt, Terrafilm
- Starring: Hasse Ekman; Eva Henning; Hilda Borgström
- Music by: Sune Waldimir
- Release date: 29 August 1949
- Running time: 82 min
- Country: Sweden
- Language: Swedish

The Girl from the Third Row (Swedish: Flickan från tredje raden) is a 1949 Swedish comedy film directed by Hasse Ekman.

== Plot ==
An extraordinary ring is being handed down amongst many people. They find it and lose it or give it away, but the ring always gives each owner good fortune or hope in some way. An angel watches over the ring and the people wearing it.

== Cast ==
- Hasse Ekman as Sture Anker, theatre manager
- Eva Henning as the angel
- Hilda Borgström as Vilma Andersson
- Maj-Britt Nilsson as Birgit
- Sven Lindberg as Göte
- Gunnar Olsson as jeweller Lilja
- Sigge Fürst as Gusten Örjevall
- Siv Thulin as Sonja Örjevall
- Stig Olin as Kalle
- Ingrid Backlin as nurse Maj
- Gunnar Björnstrand as Edvin Burelius
- Hilding Gavle as Fredrik Antonsson
- Barbro Hiort af Ornäs as Dagmar Antonsson
- Francisca Lindberg as the little girl Charlotte, daughter of Birgit and Göte
