= Sture Lagerwall =

Swedish actor (1908–1964)

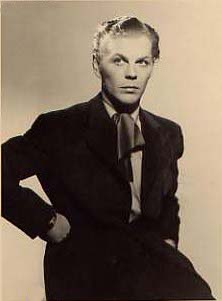
- Born: 13 December 1908; Stockholm, Sweden
- Died: 1 November 1964 (aged 55); Limhamn, Sweden
- Occupations: Actor, film director
- Years active: 1931–1963
- Spouses: Gunvor Maria Elisabet Linderoth (1932–1939) Guje Lagerwall (1940–1955) Anne-Marie Werner (m. 1957)

Sture Lagerwall (13 December 1908 – 1 November 1964) was a Swedish actor and film director. He appeared in more than 70 films between 1931 and 1963. He was born in Stockholm, and died in Limhamn, Sweden, in 1964.

== Selected filmography ==
- Say It with Music (1929)
- The False Millionaire (1931)
- The Red Day (1931)
- Mother-in-Law's Coming (1932)
- Pojkarna på Storholmen (1932)
- Marriageable Daughters (1933)
- Fired (1934)
- The Women Around Larsson (1934)
- The People of Småland (1935)
- Walpurgis Night (1935)
- Adventure (1936)
- Witches' Night (1937)
- Comrades in Uniform (1938)
- Career (1938)
- Life Begins Today (1939)
- Emilie Högquist (1939)
- The Two of Us (1939)
- Blossom Time (1940)
- Her Melody (1940)
- The Three of Us (1940)
- Lasse-Maja (1941)
- Adventurer (1942)
- Kungsgatan (1943)
- Sonja (1943)
- En dag skall gry (1944)
- The Emperor of Portugallia (1944)
- The Journey Away (1945)
- His Majesty Must Wait (1945)
- Johansson and Vestman (1946)
- Onsdagsväninnan (1946) - acted and directed)
- Love Goes Up and Down (1946)
- How to Love (1947)
- I Love You Karlsson (1947)
- The Night Watchman's Wife (1947)
- Banketten (1948)
- Loffe as a Millionaire (1948)
- Sin (1948)
- The Saucepan Journey (1950)
- The White Cat (1951)
- The Nuthouse (1951)
- Kvinnan bakom allt (1951)
- Hidden in the Fog (1953)
- The Unicorn (1955)
- The Halo Is Slipping (1957)
- The Venetian (1958)
- Summer and Sinners (1960)
- The Devil's Eye (1960)
