= Sven Lampell =

Swedish Air Force officer

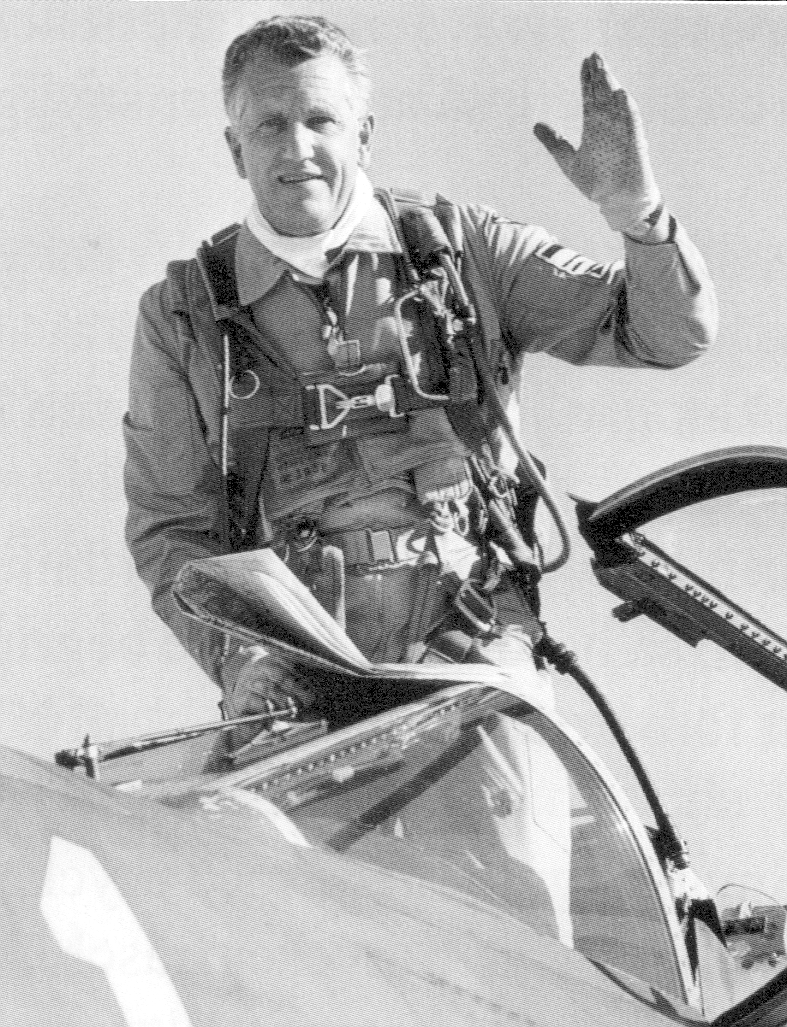
- Colonel Lampell after completing flight session.
- Born: 18 December 1920; Södertälje, Sweden
- Died: 28 June 2007 (aged 86); Hässelby, Sweden
- Spouse: Eva Dahlbeck
- Military career
- Allegiance: Sweden
- Branch: Swedish Air Force
- Service years: 1943–1972
- Rank: Colonel
- Nickname: "Lampan"
- Unit: 22 U.N. Fighter Squadron (1961–63)
- Commands: Hälsinge Wing (1965–72)
- Conflicts: Congo Crisis
- Other work: Work for the Red Cross

Sven Hjalmar Lampell (18 December 1920 – 28 June 2007) was a Swedish Air Force officer.

== Career ==
Lampell was born on 18 December 1920 in Södertälje, Sweden, the son of Hjalmar Lampell, a merchant, and his wife Tyra (née Berglund).

== Career ==
Lampell was commissioned as an officer in 1943, and was promoted to second lieutenant in 1943, captain in 1954, major in 1956 and to lieutenant colonel in the Swedish Air Force in 1961. He was chief of flight operations at Södertörn Wing (F 18) from 1956 to 1960 and chief of staff at the Third Air Command (E 3) in 1960 and was serving with the United Nations in the Congo from 1961 to 1962 and in 1963.

During the Congo Crisis from 1961 to 1963 he was Chief Fighter Operations Officer of the Swedish UN-unit 22 U.N. Fighter Squadron (F 22). Lampell was promoted to colonel in 1965 and served in the Red Cross as a part of the Biafran airlift in Biafra from 1968 to 1969 where he organized aid flights into the encircled and starving population during the Nigerian Civil War. The sight of the starving children affected him strongly and became a turning point in his life.

He served in the Red Cross in East Pakistan and Bangladesh from 1971 to 1972 and was wing commander at Hälsinge Wing (F 15) from 1965 to 1972. He left Hälsinge Wing and the Air Force in 1972 for a position as Chief Delegate at the International Red Cross in Geneva. The years serving in the Red Cross also involved missions in Jordan, Ethiopia, South Vietnam, Western Sahara, Somalia and Afghanistan.

== Other work ==
Lampell was a consultant and pilot during the filming of The Yellow Division (1954) and in the film he made, among other things, a looping around the Västerbron's bridge arch vault with a Saab 91 Safir. In the early 1960s, he led the acclaimed exhibition group Acro Hunters. In addition to his military career, he was also an elite swimmer and world champion in aeronautical pentathlon.

== Personal life ==
In 1944 Lampell married the actress Eva Dahlbeck. He was the father of Tomas (born 1944) and Magnus (born 1959). Lampell died on 28 June 2007 in Hässelby, Stockholm,

== Awards and decorations ==
=== Swedish ===
- (Sweden) Knight of the Order of the Sword (1961)
- (Sweden) Swedish Military Sports Association's medal of merit (Sveriges militära idrottsförbunds förtjänstmedalj)

=== Foreign ===
- (Netherlands) Officer of the Order of Orange-Nassau
- (Bangladesh) Friends of Liberation War Honour (posthumously, 2013)
- United Nations Medal (ONUC)

== Bibliography ==
- Lampell, Sven (1996). Mitt i stormen: med Röda korset i fält [In the midst of the storm: with the Red Cross in the field] (in Swedish). Stockholm: Sellin & partner i samarbete med Svenska Röda korset. ISBN 91-7055-161-8. SELIBR 7596773.
