= Summer with Monika =

1953 film by Ingmar Bergman

- Theatrical release poster
- Directed by: Ingmar Bergman
- Screenplay by: Ingmar Bergman
- Based on: Sommaren med Monika; 1951 novel by Per Anders Fogelström
- Produced by: Allan Ekelund
- Starring: Harriet Andersson; Lars Ekborg
- Cinematography: Gunnar Fischer
- Music by: Erik Nordgren; Les Baxter
- Distributed by: Svensk Filmindustri
- Release date: 9 February 1953 (Sweden)
- Running time: 96 minutes
- Country: Sweden
- Language: Swedish

Summer with Monika (Swedish: Sommaren med Monika) is a 1953 Swedish romantic drama film written and directed by Ingmar Bergman, based on Per Anders Fogelström's 1951 novel of the same name. Starring Harriet Andersson and Lars Ekborg as the main characters, the film was controversial because of one scene portrayal of au naturel and, along with Arne Mattsson's film One Summer of Happiness, contributed to an idea of Sweden as an immodest, sexually loose population.

The film catapulted its lead actress, Harriet Andersson, to stardom. At the time, Bergman was romantically involved with Andersson and created the film as a showcase for her talent. Despite the end of their romantic relationship, they continued to collaborate on several subsequent films, including Sawdust and Tinsel, Smiles of a Summer Night, Through a Glass Darkly, and Cries and Whispers.

== Plot ==
In Stockholm, the young working-class Harry meets Monika, an adventurous young woman, in a cafe near to his workplace. Monika invites Harry to join her to see a movie at the local cinema after his work shift. The two spend the rest of the evening together, and find themselves enamored of one another. At her home, Monika tires of her alcoholic father's incessant drinking and violent outbursts, packs her belongings and runs away. She seeks help from Harry, who goes to spend the night with her in his father's docked boat. After getting into an argument with his boss the following morning, Harry quits his job.

The two decide to leave the city, and take the boat into the Stockholm Archipelago, where they spend an idyllic summer together. When the end of the summer forces them to return home, it is clear that Monika is pregnant. Harry happily accepts responsibility and settles down with Monika and their child; he gets a real job and goes to night school to provide for his family. Monika, however, is unsatisfied with her role as homemaker. She yearns for excitement and adventure, a desire which finally leads her astray. Harry leaves town for work and comes home a day early to find his wife with another man. After deciding to separate and in his rage at her flippancy, Harry hits Monika and she leaves the apartment. They get a divorce and Monika flees the responsibility of child rearing leaving Harry with custody of their daughter, June, to raise alone. In the final shot while he looks in a mirror, he reminisces about the time they spent together.

== Cast ==
- Harriet Andersson as Monika
- Lars Ekborg as Harry
- John Harryson as Lelle
- Georg Skarstedt as Harry's father
- Dagmar Ebbesen as Harry's aunt
- Åke Fridell as Monika's father
- Naemi Briese as Monika's mother
- Åke Grönberg as Harry's friend at work
- Sigge Fürst as Porcelain warehouse worker

== US release ==
In September 1955, two years after the film was released in Sweden, a high-profile article "Sin & Sweden" was written in Time magazine, about living conditions in a secularized Swedish society. The debate in the US that followed, in the midst of the Cold War, was marked by conservative hostility to anything resembling socialism. This and above all commercial interests contributed to the exploitation market's interest in the concept of Swedish sin.

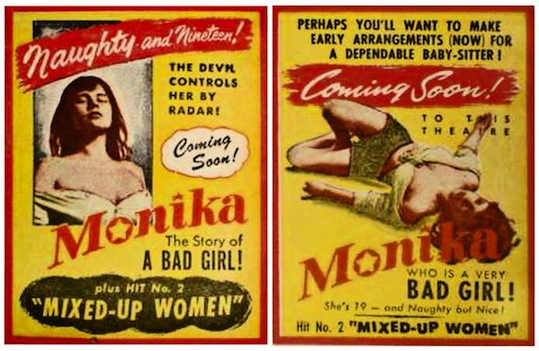
Two small promotional flyers for the American presentation of the film.

Also in 1955, exploitation film presenter Kroger Babb purchased the US rights to the film. To increase excitement for the film, he edited it down to 62 minutes and emphasized the film's nudity. Renaming the film Monika, the Story of a Bad Girl, he provided a good deal of suggestive promotional material, including postcards featuring the nude Andersson.

The exploitation version of Bergman’s film successfully played rural drive-in theatres for years, unaffected by the fact that a year later it was re-contracted, this time with Janus Films, to let the uncut, subtitled version play at art-theaters as well. The film was thus available to two different types of American audiences simultaneously.

== Reception ==
Summer with Monika has a 100% approval rating on Rotten Tomatoes.

== See also ==
- Nudity in film
- The exploitation film Blonde in Bondage (1957) is directly inspired by the Time magazine article.
