= Adventurer (film) =

1942 film directed by Gunnar Olsson

- Directed by: Gunnar Olsson
- Written by: Nils Ferlin (poems); Torsten Flodén
- Produced by: Olle Brunaeus
- Starring: Sture Lagerwall; Ingrid Backlin; Margit Manstad
- Cinematography: Sven Thermænius
- Edited by: Gösta Bjurman
- Music by: Erik Baumann; Knut Brodin; Nathan Görling
- Production company: Europa Film
- Distributed by: Europa Film
- Release date: 11 September 1942
- Running time: 116 minutes
- Country: Sweden
- Language: Swedish

Adventurer (Swedish: En äventyrare) is a 1942 Swedish historical adventure film directed by Gunnar Olsson and starring Sture Lagerwall, Ingrid Backlin and Margit Manstad. It was shot at the Sundbyberg Studios in Stockholm. The film's sets were designed by the art director Max Linder. It is loosely based on the life of the 17th-century writer Lars Wivallius.

== Cast ==
- Sture Lagerwall as Lars Wiwallius / Eric Gyllenstierna
- Ingrid Backlin as Gertrud Grijp
- Margit Manstad as Theresa Palditska
- Wiktor Andersson as Jesper Bock
- Thor Modéen as Wulff Grijp
- Gull Natorp as Helena Daa
- Hilding Gavle as Peder
- Henrik Dyfverman as Gustaf II Adolf
- Olof Sandborg as Richelieu
- Tore Lindwall as Wallenstein
- Willy Peters as Rönnow Bille
- Bror Bügler as Casten Bille
- Gunnar Björnstrand as Count Conti
- Olle Hilding as Pater Josef
- Tord Stål as de Trevillac
- Blenda Bruno as Agneta
- Arne Lindblad as Charlot, Gyllenstierna's servant
- Hartwig Fock as Boat captain
- Gunnel Broström as Alice
- Ingemar Holde as Anders
- Charlie Almlöf as Astrologer
- Erik Rosén as Judge
- Ann-Margret Bergendahl as Kätchen
- Åke Claesson as Dr. Schonæus
- Georg Fernqvist as Raath
- Agda Helin as Margareta
- Hugo Jacobsson as Nikodemus
- Gideon Wahlberg as Innkeeper
- Stig Johanson as Farm-Hand
- Curt Masreliez as Servant at Gyllenstierna's
- Gunnel Wadner as Wedding Guest
- Artur Cederborgh as Guest at the wedding

== Bibliography ==
- Klossner, Michael. The Europe of 1500-1815 on Film and Television: A Worldwide Filmography of Over 2550 Works, 1895 Through 2000. McFarland, 2002.
