= Som folk är mest =

- Directed by: Hasse Ekman
- Written by: Hasse Ekman (writer) Herbert Grevenius (play)
- Produced by: Lorens Marmstedt, Terrafilm
- Starring: Barbro Kollberg; Karl-Arne Holmsten; Stig Järrel; John Botvid; Tore Lindwall; Willy Peters; Agneta Lagerfeldt; Inga-Bodil Vetterlund
- Music by: Kai Gullmar, Sune Waldimir
- Release date: 9 September 1944
- Running time: 87 min
- Country: Sweden
- Language: Swedish

Som folk är mest (English: As people are most) is a 1944 Swedish comedy film directed by Hasse Ekman.

== Plot summary ==
Kurre and Inga are engaged to be married, but their income is not sufficient for that just yet. Inga has no prospects of getting a raise, she has a hard time with the zealous office manager Enander. Inga has a liability to be late for work in the mornings and therefore get into trouble. The dictatorial Enander, to whom punctuality is more than a virtue, has had enough of it and is ready to burst out his anger at her. If only he could catch her being late...

To complicate matters further, one of Kurres colleagues, the sweet and flirtatious Miss Hansson, has started to court Kurre. All this will lead to misunderstandings and complications which are not so easy to solve. Will Kurre and Inga ever be able to get married?

== Cast ==
- Barbro Kollberg as Inga Larsson
- Karl-Arne Holmsten as Kurre Östberg
- Stig Järrel as Enander
- John Botvid as Karlsson
- Tore Lindwall as Managing
- Willy Peters as Fillebom
- Agneta Lagerfeldt as Miss Hansson
- Inga-Bodil Vetterlund as Kaj
- Åke Engfeldt as Axel
- Terje Valenkamph as Hugo, "Hugge"
