= Torsten Flodén =

Swedish screenwriter and lyricist

- Born: 26 June 1910; Sweden
- Died: 29 December 1948 (aged 38); Stockholm, Sweden
- Occupation: Writer
- Years active: 1933–1947 (film)

Torsten Flodén (1910-1948) was a Swedish screenwriter and lyricist.

== Selected filmography ==
- Perhaps a Poet (1933)
- The Atlantic Adventure (1934)
- Shipwrecked Max (1936)
- Her Melody (1940)
- Hanna in Society (1940)
- Lucky Young Lady (1941)
- How to Tame a Real Man (1941)
- Lasse-Maja (1941)
- Adventurer (1942)
- The Rose of Tistelön (1945)
- Meeting in the Night (1946)
- The Night Watchman's Wife (1947)

== Bibliography ==
- Rochelle Wright. The Visible Wall: Jews and Other Ethnic Outsiders in Swedish Film. SIU Press, 1998.
