= Face to Face (1976 film) =

1976 film

- Written by: Ingmar Bergman
- Directed by: Ingmar Bergman
- Starring: Liv Ullmann; Erland Josephson; Gunnar Björnstrand; Aino Taube; Kristina Adolphson
- Country of origin: Sweden
- Original language: Swedish

Production
- Producer: Lars-Owe Carlberg
- Running time: 114–177 minutes (multiple versions)

Original release
- Release: 5 April 1976

Face to Face (Swedish: Ansikte mot ansikte) is a 1976 Swedish drama film written and directed by Ingmar Bergman. It tells the story of a psychiatrist who is suffering from a mental illness. It stars Liv Ullmann and Erland Josephson.

It is also the film debut of Lena Olin.

== Releases ==
The film was conceived and produced as a four-part mini-series on Swedish television with a running time of 177 minutes. The episodes were titled:

1. Uppbrottet (The Separation)
2. Gränsen (The Border)
3. Skymningslandet (The Twilight Land)
4. Återkomsten (The Return)

It was edited for theatrical releases for running times from 114 to 135 minutes. However, the theatrical version premiered first. The film was later screened at the 1976 Cannes Film Festival held in May, but was not entered into the main competition. The television version aired in Sweden over four weeks in April and May of that year, and was released on-demand by Cinematograph AB in 2022.

== Plot ==
Dr. Jenny Isaksson (Liv Ullmann) is a psychiatrist who has taken a temporary job as the medical supervisor at a mental hospital while her husband is in America and their daughter Anna is at camp. As she and her family are in the process of selling their home, she temporarily moves in with her grandparents (Gunnar Björnstrand, Aino Taube), who cared for her after her parents died when she was a child. The experience of moving into her old bedroom proves disturbing for her and conjures up feelings of anxiety, resulting in her beginning to have dreams and then waking visions of a one-eyed, old woman. Jenny's personal problems are compounded by Mari, a particularly disturbed patient at the mental hospital, who is prone to fits of violence and who tells Jenny that she is incapable of treating her because she cannot experience love.

At a party hosted by the ex-wife of one of her colleagues at the mental hospital, Jenny meets the divorced Tomas (Erland Josephson), a medical doctor. After he flirts with her, she agrees to go home with him, where she rejects the idea of having sex with him before he brings it up. Nonplussed, Tomas calls her a taxi, and they agree to meet again sometime in the future for a potential sexual encounter.

Going to her old home one day, Jenny discovers Mari, who has escaped from the mental institution; with her are two men who explain that Mari requested they take her to Jenny, whose address they found in the phone book. When Jenny attempts to call the police, the men attack her and attempt to rape her, but quickly stop when they have difficulty penetrating her. That night, Jenny accompanies Tomas to a concert and then returns home with him, telling him she wants a non-sexual encounter with him in which they will sleep in bed together without touching. In the middle of the night, Jenny tells him what happened and admits that she is so desperate to experience physical pleasure that she wanted the rapist to have sex with her, but that she could not become physically aroused. When Tomas attempts to comfort her, she suffers a breakdown and asks to be sent home in a cab, assuring him they'll see one another soon.

Jenny sleeps at her grandparents' for several days, missing work. When they leave town for the weekend she calls Tomas to go to the movies, but instead hangs up on him, records a suicide note on a tape recorder in which she tells her husband that she never has experienced emotional or physical pleasure, and then takes fifty Nembutols.

In a dream, she apologizes to herself for her suicide attempt, speaks to her grandmother, and tells herself that she fears old people like her grandparents. She encounters an imagined Tomas, who warns her not to open the door to her deep and forgotten memories, but she opens anyway. She sees the old woman, who caresses and comforts her. Jenny wakes in the hospital. Tomas is there. He went to find her after she hung up on him and didn’t answer when he tried calling back.

They talk, and Tomas tries to comfort her by telling her about his strict upbringing, not being allowed to burp or fart at dinner. In a second dream, she ineptly tries to deal with a crowded room of patients. Her grandfather tells her that he’s afraid of dying, and Anna sees her and runs away.

When she wakes, her husband is there, but he tells her that he has to return to America. She tells him to tell her grandmother the truth about what happened and that she will talk to Anna.

In the next dream, she tries to find her parents, whom she last saw at their funeral when she was age 9. She is distressed by guilt and shame. When she finds them they first leave her, but when they return to comfort her, she pushes them away.

Jenny wakes and tells Tomas about her childhood. They share deep secrets. Tomas says that he never as divorced, and instead he had lost a friend, a man he lived with for five years. The conversation deteriorates, and Jenny becomes hysterical. In a last dream, she attends her funeral, waking during the cremation.

A nurse tells Jenny that Anna wants to meet her. She tries to tell Anna what she did and why, but it doesn’t go well. Anna tells Jenny that she knew that she never liked her, and she leaves. Tomas then tells her that he’s going to Jamaica for an amoral vacation and may not return.

Jenny returns to her grandmother who believes that Jenny has been fatigued. She is distressed by her husband’s impending death. Jenny offers her some comfort and then calls the mental hospital to tell them that she’ll be in to work in the morning.

== Cast ==
=== Principal cast (in credits order) ===
- Liv Ullmann as Dr. Jenny Isaksson
- Erland Josephson as Dr. Tomas Jacobi
- Aino Taube as the Grandmother
- Gunnar Björnstrand as the Grandfather
- Kristina Adolphson as Nurse Veronica
- Marianne Aminoff as Jenny's mother
- Gösta Ekman as Mikael Strömberg
- Helene Friberg as Anna, Jenny's daughter
- Ulf Johanson as Helmuth Wankel
- Sven Lindberg as Jenny's husband
- Jan Erik Lindqvist as Jenny's father
- Birger Malmsten as rapist
- Sif Ruud as Elisabeth Wankel
- Göran Stangertz as rapist

=== Rest of cast (in alphabetical order) ===
- Lena Olin as shop assistant
- Rebecca Pawlo as shop assistant
- Gösta Prüzelius as Jenny's father
- Tore Segelcke as the woman
- Kari Sylwan as Maria

== Reception ==
Rotten Tomatoes reports 80% approval of Face to Face based on 20 reviews. Vincent Canby was highly favorable and wrote "Mr. Bergman is more mysterious, more haunting, more contradictory than ever, though the style of the film has never been more precise, clear, levelheaded." Roger Ebert, while calling it "confused and sometimes overwrought", awarded it three out of four stars and lauded Ullmann's performance as "one of the greatest performances in an Ingmar Bergman film" up to that point.

== Awards ==
Face to Face was nominated for Best Foreign Language Film by the U.S. National Board of Review. It received nominations at the Academy Awards for Best Actress (Ullmann) and Best Director (Bergman).

Ullmann was nominated by BAFTA in the Best Actress category. She was named Best Actress by the New York Film Critics Circle Awards, the National Board of Review and the Los Angeles Film Critics Association. The film won the Los Angeles Film Critics Association Award for Best Foreign Language Film.

It was named by the Golden Globes as its Best Foreign Language Film of the year, and Ullmann was nominated for the Golden Globe Award for Best Actress – Motion Picture Drama.
