= Birger Malmsten =

Swedish actor (1920–1991)

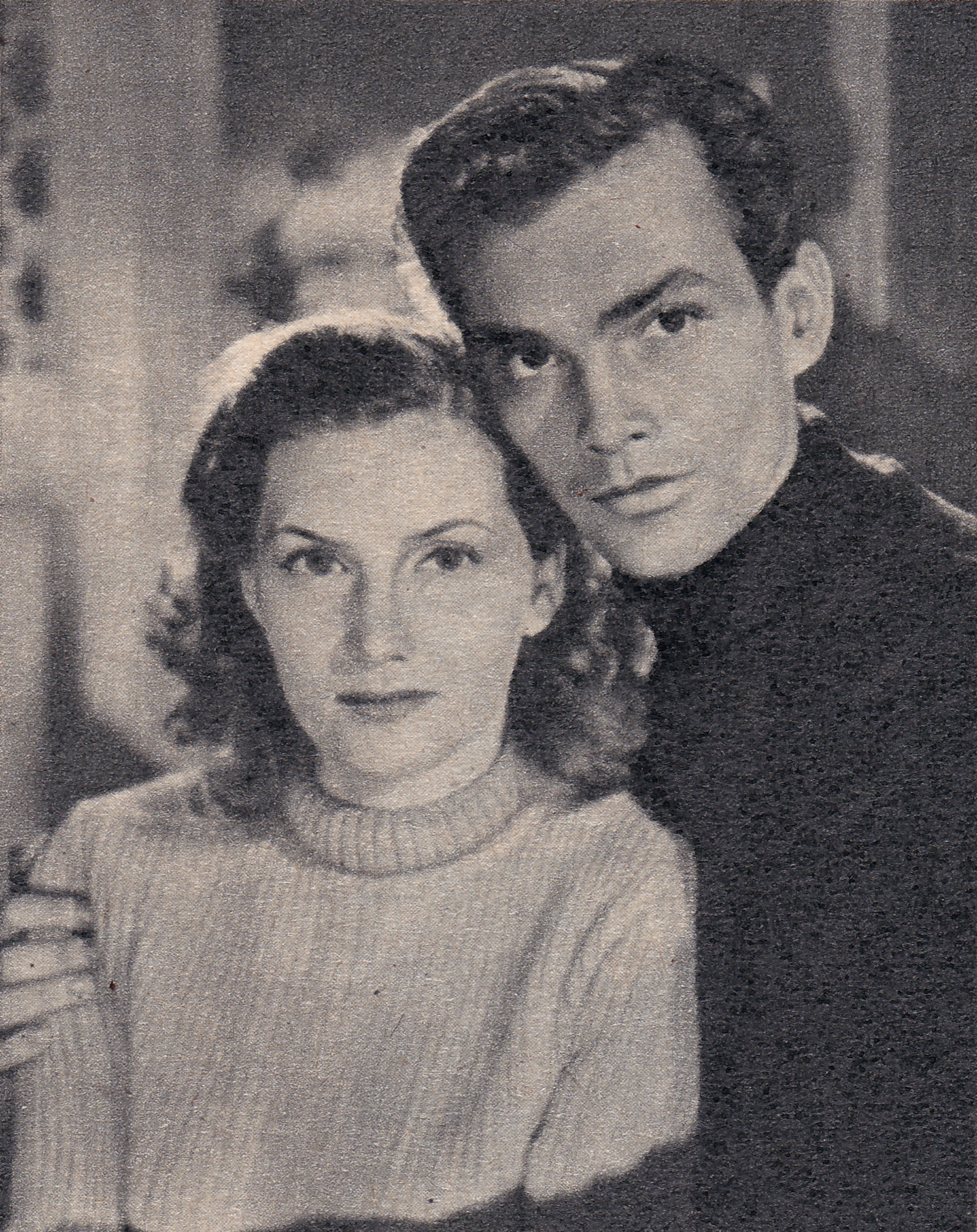
- Malmsten with Barbro Kollberg in 1957
- Born: 23 December 1920; Gräsö, Sweden
- Died: 15 February 1991 (aged 70); Stockholm, Sweden
- Years active: 1936–1987

Birger Malmsten (23 December 1920 – 15 February 1991) was a Swedish actor. He had many roles in Ingmar Bergman's films.

== Selected filmography ==
- South of the Highway (1936) – Student (uncredited)
- Snurriga familjen (1940) – Staff Member (uncredited)
- General von Döbeln (1942) – Lieutenant at Svea Livgarde (uncredited)
- Ombyte av tåg (1943) – Young Man at the Café (uncredited)
- Life and Death (1943) – Telephone Operator (uncredited)
- Count Only the Happy Moments (1944) – Helge Wikström
- Torment (1944) – Kreutz – Student (uncredited)
- We Need Each Other (1944) – Guest at Café
- The Serious Game (1945) – Kaj Lidner (uncredited)
- It Rains on Our Love (1946) – David
- When the Meadows Blossom (1946) – Gunnar Hellman
- A Ship to India (1947) – Johannes Blom
- Crime in the Sun (1947) – Harry
- Music in Darkness (1948) – Bengt Vyldeke
- Banketten (1948) – Rex
- Eva (1948) – Bo
- Dangerous Spring (1949) – Torsten Hertgren
- Prison (1949) – Thomas
- Thirst (1949) – Bertil
- To Joy (1950) – Marcel
- Restaurant Intim (1950) – Alf Lindholm
- Regementets ros (1950) – Ivan Jansson
- Summer Interlude (1951) – Henrik
- Secrets of Women (1952) – Martin Lobelius
- Ursula, the Girl from the Finnish Forests (1953) – Hans Halvarsson
- All the World's Delights (1953) – Mats Eliasson
- No Man's Woman (1953) – Erland Klemensson
- Dance in the Smoke (1954) – Man in haystack (uncredited)
- Time of Desire (1954) – Algot Wiberg
- Gabrielle (1954) – Bertil Lindström
- The Unicorn (1955) – Christer Allard
- People of the Finnish Forests (1955) – David Amberg
- Moon Over Hellesta (1956) – Carl Anckarberg
- Som man bäddar... (1957) – Peter Kallander
- Encounters in the Twilight (1957) – Olle Lindberg
- Night Light (1957) – Mikael Sjöberg
- Playing on the Rainbow (1958) – Hasse Eriksson
- Laila (1958) – Mellet Omma
- Guldgrävarna (1959) – Jimmy Wilson
- Med fara för livet (1959) – Paul Forsman
- The Silence (1963) – The Bartender
- Masculin Féminin (1966) – Lui (l'homme dans le film)
- Carmilla (1968) – Doctor Per Ek
- ...som havets nakna vind (1968) – Morbror
- Ann and Eve (1970) – Amos Mathews
- The Last Adventure (1974) – Company Commander
- Face to Face (1976) – Rapist
- Tabu (1977) – Publisher
- Jönssonligan får guldfeber (1984) – Öb
