= Each to His Own Way =

1948 film

- Directed by: Hasse Ekman
- Written by: Hasse Ekman
- Produced by: Europafilm
- Starring: Gunn Wållgren; Hasse Ekman; Marianne Aminoff; Stig Järrel
- Music by: Erik Baumann
- Release date: 16 February 1948
- Running time: 109 min
- Country: Sweden
- Language: Swedish

Each to His Own Way (Swedish: Var sin väg) is a 1948 Swedish film directed by Hasse Ekman.

== Cast ==
- Gunn Wållgren - Birgit, actress
- Hasse Ekman - Tage Sundell, doctor
- Uno Henning - Birger Holmberg, doctor
- Marianne Aminoff - Sonja Collin
- Stig Järrel - Nils Brenner, actor
- Gunnar Björnstrand - Sture Widman
- Eva Dahlbeck - Karin Brofeldt, actress
- Åke Grönberg - Gösta Sund, doctor
- Gösta Cederlund - Hellsten, professor
- Hilda Borgström - Mrs. Lundkvist
- Björn Berglund - Bengt Carlgren, doctor
- Tord Stål - the gynecologist
- Gull Natorp - Gabriella Collin, Sonjas mother
- Hugo Jacobson - Hjalmar Collin, Sonjas father
- Karl-Arne Holmsten - doctor
- Stig Olin - Fredrik Salén
- Willy Peters - Cetrén
