= Elsa Ebbesen =

Swedish actress (1890–1977)

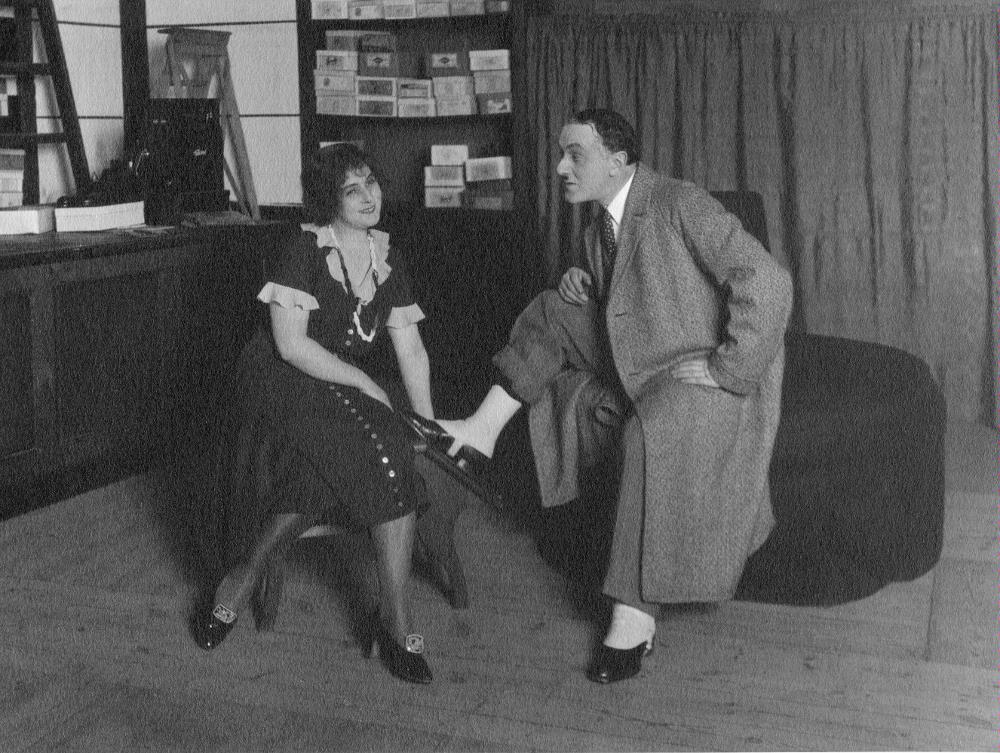
- Ebbesen on stage with Otto Landahl c.1930
- Born: Elsa Gerda Ebbesen; 7 July 1890; Stockholm, Sweden
- Died: 21 December 1977 (aged 87); Täby, Sweden
- Other name: Elsa Ebbesen-Thornblad
- Occupation: Actress
- Years active: 1906-1975
- Relatives: Dagmar Ebbesen (siser)

Elsa Ebbesen (7 July 1890 – 21 December 1977) was a Swedish stage and film actress. A character actress she appeared in Swedish films and later television programmes over the course of several decades.

== Selected filmography ==
- House Slaves (1923)
- Ulla, My Ulla (1930)
- Adventure (1936)
- Emilie Högquist (1939)
- The Crazy Family (1940)
- The Three of Us (1940)
- The Fight Continues (1941)
- Goransson's Boy (1941)
- Only a Woman (1941)
- Första divisionen (1941)
- Goransson's Boy (1941)
- Lucky Young Lady (1941)
- Katrina (1943)
- Prince Gustaf (1944)
- The People of Hemsö (1944)
- The Bells of the Old Town (1946)
- Crime in the Sun (1947)
- Dynamite (1947)
- How to Love (1947)
- The Quartet That Split Up (1950)
- Defiance (1952)
- Love (1952)
- Say It with Flowers (1952)
- Stupid Bom (1953)
- The Glass Mountain (1953)
- Storm Over Tjurö (1954)
- Sir Arne's Treasure (1954)
- Young Summer (1954)
- The Unicorn (1955)
- Egen ingång (1956)
- Seventh Heaven (1956)
- Night Child (1956)
- The Minister of Uddarbo (1957)
- A Guest in His Own House (1957)
- The Jazz Boy (1958)
- Crime in Paradise (1959)
- Winter Light (1963)
- Morianna (1965)
- The Touch (1971)

== Bibliography ==
- Paietta, Ann C. Teachers in the Movies: A Filmography of Depictions of Grade School, Preschool and Day Care Educators, 1890s to the Present. McFarland, 2007.
- Steene, Birgitta. Ingmar Bergman: A Reference Guide. Amsterdam University Press, 2005.
