= Nathan Görling =

Swedish composer

- Born: 7 October 1905; Alingsås, Sweden
- Died: 23 October 2002 (aged 97); Stockholm, Sweden
- Other name: Olof Nathan Görling
- Occupation: Composer
- Years active: 1937-1956 (film)

Nathan Görling (1905–2002) was a Swedish composer of film scores.

== Selected filmography ==
- Kalle's Inn (1939)
- Wanted (1939)
- Frestelse (1940)
- Hanna in Society (1940)
- Her Melody (1940)
- Lasse-Maja (1941)
- Lucky Young Lady (1941)
- How to Tame a Real Man (1941)
- Adventurer (1942)
- The Case of Ingegerd Bremssen (1942)
- Stopp! Tänk på något annat (1944)
- The Green Lift (1944)
- Skipper Jansson (1944)
- Widower Jarl (1945)
- Meeting in the Night (1946)
- Brita in the Merchant's House (1946)
- While the Door Was Locked (1946)
- One Swallow Does Not Make a Summer (1947)
- Wedding Night (1947)
- Life at Forsbyholm Manor (1948)
- Pimpernel Svensson (1950)
- Restaurant Intim (1950)

== Bibliography ==
- Qvist, Per Olov & von Bagh, Peter. Guide to the Cinema of Sweden and Finland. Greenwood Publishing Group, 2000.
