= Meeting in the Night =

- Directed by: Hasse Ekman
- Written by: Hasse Ekman; Torsten Flodén
- Produced by: Hasse Ekman; Europafilm
- Starring: Hasse Ekman; Eva Dahlbeck; Ulf Palme
- Music by: Erik Baumann; Nathan Görling
- Release date: 30 September 1946
- Running time: 86 min
- Country: Sweden
- Language: Swedish

Meeting in the Night (Swedish: Möte i natten) is a 1946 Swedish film directed by Hasse Ekman. The film stars Ekman, Eva Dahlbeck and Ulf Palme.

== Plot summary ==
The journalist Åke Bergström writes a critical article about prisons in Sweden. The magazine's editor in chief disagrees with him and removes the article. He also fires Åke, who gets the idea that he should pretend to murder a friend to gain real knowledge about life inside the walls of a prison. What sounds like a clever but mad idea at first, soon turns out to be a real nightmare...

== Cast ==
- Hasse Ekman - Åke Bergström
- Eva Dahlbeck - Marit Rylander
- Ulf Palme - Sune Berger
- Tord Bernheim - Svarten
- Peter Lindgren - Filarn
- Hugo Björne - direktör Rylander
- Elsa Widborg - Argonda
- Eivor Landström - Sonja
- Karin Alexandersson - Lovisa
- Sigge Fürst - Spacklarn
- Gösta Cederlund - Holmstedt, editor in chief
- Carl Reinholdz - Lången
- Wiktor "Kulörten" Andersson - Darris
- Josua Bengtson - Eskil
- Charlie Almlöf - Carnival Barker at Gröna Lund
- Artur Rolén - Karlsson
- Tord Stål - Karl-Axel, Second Editor
- Åke Engfeldt - Telegraph Worker
- Arne Lindblad - Maitre d' at Saltsjöholm's hotel
- Sten Hedlund - Detective
