= Första divisionen =

1941 Swedish drama film

- Directed by: Hasse Ekman
- Written by: Hasse Ekman; Alvar Zacke
- Produced by: Lorens Marmstedt
- Starring: Lars Hanson; Gunnar Sjöberg; Stig Järrel; Hasse Ekman; Irma Christenson
- Music by: Lars-Erik Larsson
- Distributed by: Terrafilm
- Release date: 23 September 1941 (Sweden)
- Running time: 92 minutes
- Country: Sweden
- Language: Swedish

Första divisionen (English: First Squadron) is a 1941 Swedish drama film directed by Hasse Ekman.

== Plot summary ==
After a period of hospitalization, caused by an aircraft accident, second lieutenant Gunnar Bråde returns to his old squadron. During an exercise a bomb hits his plane's propeller and he is forced to jump out with a parachute over the target area. This is not observed by any of the pilots, who continue to drop their bombs...

== Cast ==
- Lars Hanson as Colonel Magnus Ståhlberg, commander of Royal Nerike Air Force Wing in Lindesnäs
- Gunnar Sjöberg as Captain Krister Hansson, squadron commander
- Stig Järrel as Lieutenant Rutger Sperling
- Hasse Ekman as Second lieutenant Gunnar Bråde
- Emil Fjellström as Sergeant major Persson
- Ragnar Falck as Sergeant Bertil "Jocke" Johansson, signaller
- Carl Reinholdz as Corporal "Storken" Karlsson
- Irma Christenson as Mona Falkstedt, Kristers fiancée
- Britta Brunius as Greta Johansson, Jockes wife
- Linnéa Hillberg as Mrs. Bråde, Gunnars mother
- Hugo Björne as Docent Åkerman, oculist
- Kotti Chave as Lieutenant Billman, "Bill"
- Bror Bügler as Captain Fallenius, Medical Officer

Not credited

- Ingemar Holde as Corporal "Jompa" Blomgren
- Karl Erik Flens as Sjövall, mässuppassare
- Elsa Ebbesen as Lovisa, Mrs Bråde's maid
- Gerda Björne as Mrs Falkstedt, Mona's mother
- Agda Helin as Owner of the glove shop
- Bengt Järrel as Billman's signaller
- Walter Sarmell as Hansson's signaller
- Mary Gräber as lady in Docent Åkerman's waiting room
- Mona Sjöstrand as Docent Åkerman's nurse
- Aurore Palmgren as the nurse at birthing center
- Julie Bernby as customer in the glove shop
- Sif Ruud as nurse in Sperling's hospital room
- Gösta Seth as pilot
- Axel Göte Ekdahl as pilot
- Sven Hedberg as pilot
- Åke Berg as pilot
- Lennart Peyron as pilot
- Rolf Svartengren as pilot
- Nils Hellquist as pilot
- Torkel Westerlund as air force officer at the farewell dinner
- Claës-Henrik Nordenskiöld as air force officer at the farewell dinner
- Bengt Rosenius as air force officer at the farewell dinner
- Grels Naeslund as air force officer at the farewell dinner
- Karl-Erik Nilson as air force officer at the farewell dinner
- Harald Wahlén as air force officer at the farewell dinner
