= Lyckan kommer =

- Directed by: Hasse Ekman
- Written by: Hasse Ekman, Bengt Janzon
- Produced by: Lorens Marmstedt, Terrafilm
- Starring: Stig Järrel; Marguerite Viby; Carl Reinholdz; Dagmar Olsson
- Music by: Kai Gullmar, Jules Sylvain
- Release date: 17 August 1942
- Running time: 102 min
- Country: Sweden
- Language: Swedish

Lyckan kommer (English: Happiness Comes) is a 1942 Swedish comedy film directed by Hasse Ekman. Ekmans script was filmed in Denmark the same year with the title Lykken kommer, directed by Emanuel Gregers and with Marguerite Viby repeating her role and Ebbe Rode playing Järrels role.

== Plot summary ==
This fairy tale for grown-up children tells us about Georg and Monika Hedberg, they are so rich and live in such luxury that they have lost sight of each other and the ability to be happy, the way they were when they lived in humble circumstances. Now they quarrel and annoy each other instead, and finally they agree to get a divorce.

In consultation with their lawyer they make a bet to save their marriage. The lawyer says that they are simply too spoiled, impractical and behave like two children. They will now start over again, move to a humble apartment, go back to work and live solely on their income during these months while the lawyer freezes all their assets. Can a more modest life make happiness come back?

== Cast ==
- Stig Järrel as Georg Hedberg
- Marguerite Viby as Monika Hedberg
- Carl Reinholdz as Algot Larsson
- Dagmar Olsson as Bojan Larsson
- Georg Funkquist as Tranér
- Torsten Winge as Svane
- Lasse Krantz as Bergman
- Bengt Janzon as Dimgren
- Einar Axelsson as Berger
- Hugo Björne as Lennart Broberg
- Birgit Sergelius as Lillan Broberg
- Bertil Ehrenmark as Sergej Borsakoff
- Jura Tamkin as Alexandrovitj
- Berndt Westerberg as Mr. Birke
- Karl Erik Flens as Nils Boström
