= Egen ingång =

1956 film

- Directed by: Hasse Ekman
- Written by: Hasse Ekman, Sigurd Hoel
- Produced by: Svensk Filmindustri
- Starring: Maj-Britt Nilsson; Alf Kjellin; Hasse Ekman; Lars Ekborg
- Release date: 20 February 1956 (Sweden)
- Running time: 93 minutes
- Country: Sweden
- Language: Swedish

Egen ingång (Separate Entrance) is a 1956 Swedish drama film directed by Hasse Ekman. The film is based on Sigurd Hoel's novel En dag i oktober (One Day in October).

== Plot ==
It is a seemingly ordinary day in October. Since she separated from her husband six months ago, Marianne Stenman has lived in a room with a separate entrance on Kavallerigatan 27 in Stockholm. But to Marianne this is not an ordinary day, when we first meet her she has only six hours to live. The film lays the puzzle of Marianne's last hours, piece by piece.

== Cast ==
- Maj-Britt Nilsson as Marianne Stenman
- Alf Kjellin as Arvid Stenman
- Hasse Ekman as Sture Falk
- Gertrud Fridh as Margit Friberg
- Sigge Fürst as Hjalmar Friberg
- Bibi Andersson as Karin Johansson
- Lars Ekborg as Ekelöf
- Gunvor Pontén as Mrs. Falk
- Elsa Carlsson as Mrs. Petreus
- Holger Löwenadler as Consul Oskar Petreus
- Hjördis Petterson as Mrs. Gabrielsson
- Marianne Löfgren as Mrs. Johansson
- Hugo Björne as Hans Gabrielsson
- Elsa Ebbesen as Mariannes aunt
- Sven-Eric Gamble as photographer
- Sif Ruud as Wardrobe attendant
- Siv Ericks as Wardrobe attendant
- Ludde Juberg as Theatre doorman
- Tord Stål as Professor Anderberg
