= The Halo Is Slipping =

1957 film

- Directed by: Hasse Ekman
- Written by: Hasse Ekman
- Produced by: Allan Ekelund
- Starring: Sickan Carlsson; Hasse Ekman; Sture Lagerwall; Yvonne Lombard
- Cinematography: Martin Bodin
- Edited by: Oscar Rosander
- Music by: Harry Arnold; Gösta Theselius
- Production company: Svensk Filmindustri
- Distributed by: Svensk Filmindustri
- Release date: 1 July 1957
- Running time: 93 minutes
- Country: Sweden
- Language: Swedish

The Halo Is Slipping (Swedish: Med glorian på sned) is a 1957 Swedish comedy film directed by Hasse Ekman and starring Ekman, Sickan Carlsson, Sture Lagerwall and Yvonne Lombard. It was shot at the Råsunda Studios in Stockholm. The film's sets were designed by the art director P.A. Lundgren.

== Plot summary ==
Birgitta Lövgren works as a secretary for the publisher Per-Axel Dahlander. Under the pseudonym Eurydice, she writes a romance novel, which she sends to Anders Dahls publishing house anonymously. The story circles around a nurse who has increasingly drifted away from her husband and is harbouring warm feelings towards her boss. To twist everything around Birgitta's husband's mistress, Vera Alm, claims that she has written the novel. Birgitta can't expose her lies since she does not want anyone to know that she has written it, especially her boss...

== Cast ==
- Sickan Carlsson as Birgitta Lövgren, secretary
- Hasse Ekman as Per-Axel Dahlander, publisher
- Sture Lagerwall as Sixten Lövgren, violinist
- Yvonne Lombard as Vera Alm
- Siv Ericks as Miss Svensson
- Olof Sandborg as doctor Petreus
- Holger Löwenadler as Broberg
- Stig Järrel as Karl Antån
- Claes-Håkan Westergren as Hiker
- Olof Thunberg as Liljeroth
- Hans Strååt as Yngve Englund
- Hariette Garellick as Mrs. Englund
- Börje Mellvig as Lundmark
- Carl-Axel Elfving as Kalle, Miss Svenssons boyfriend
- Arthur Fischer as Kronstrand
- Bengt Blomgren as Band leader at Radiotjänst
- Gösta Prüzelius as Maitre d'
- Eric Gustafson as Hotel Manager
