= Lasse-Maja (film) =

1941 film

- Directed by: Gunnar Olsson
- Written by: Torsten Flodén
- Starring: Sture Lagerwall; Liane Linden; Emil Fjellström
- Cinematography: Harald Berglund
- Edited by: Emil A. Lingheim
- Music by: Erik Baumann; Nathan Görling
- Production company: Europa Film
- Distributed by: Europa Film
- Release date: 28 November 1941
- Running time: 115 minutes
- Country: Sweden
- Language: Swedish

Lasse-Maja is a 1941 Swedish historical comedy film directed by Gunnar Olsson and starring Sture Lagerwall, Liane Linden and Emil Fjellström. It marked the screen debut of actress Mai Zetterling. It was shot at the Sundbyberg Studios in Stockholm. The film's sets were designed by the art director Max Linder. It is based on the career of the 19th-century thief Lasse-Maja, famous in history for disguising himself as a woman during his stealing tours.

== Cast ==
- Sture Lagerwall as Lars Molin
- Liane Linden as Lena Andersdotter
- Emil Fjellström as Silver-Jan
- John Ekman as Niklas Halling
- Hugo Jacobsson as Linus
- Wiktor Andersson as Petter
- Arthur Natorp as Anders i Lilltorpet
- Rune Carlsten as Krusenhielm
- Hjördis Petterson as Madame Agathe
- Margit Manstad as Liselotte
- Carl Barcklind as Ehrenstolphe
- Karl-Magnus Thulstrup as King Karl XIV Johan
- Kerstin Berger as Emilie
- Jeanette Von Heidenstam a s Anne-Sofie
- Mai Zetterling as Fanny
- Willy Peters as Alphonse
- Georg Årlin as Priest
- Anders Frithiof as Judge
- Hugo Björne as Place-Major Ehrenstolpe
- Olov Wigren as Adjutant
- Gustaf Hjärne as Prison guard
- Torsten Winge as Police Chief
- Gideon Wahlberg as Inn Keeper
- Nils Ohlin as The King's Marshall
- Emmy Albiin as Blind mother Britta in Vingåker
- Albert Ståhl as Zachrisson, fencer
- Per-Axel Arosenius as Man at the inn
- Helga Brofeldt as Guest at baron Krusenhielm's party
- David Erikson as Priest at baron Krusenhielm's party
- Erik Forslund as Prisoner
- Sven-Eric Gamble as Son of man in rowing boat
- Ernst Brunman as Inn keeper
- Agda Helin as Inn keeper
- Arne Lindblad as Customs guard
- Uno Larsson as Soldier
- Helge Karlsson as Ola i Backa
- Artur Cederborgh as Cook at the jail
- Gösta Grip as Lieutenant outside prison in Örebro
- Curt Masreliez as Young man at the opera
- Julia Cæsar as Woman

== Bibliography ==
- Krawc, Alfred. International Directory of Cinematographers, Set- and Costume Designers in Film: Denmark, Finland, Norway, Sweden (from the beginnings to 1984). Saur, 1986.
