= Eva Dahlbeck =

Swedish actress (1920–2008)

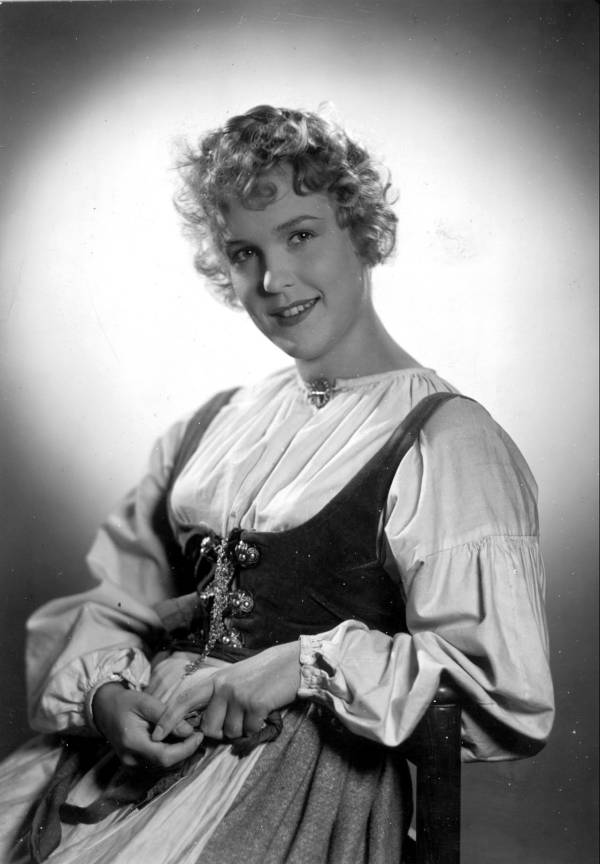
- Dahlbeck in 1942
- Born: Eva Elisabet Dahlbeck; 8 March 1920; Saltsjö-Duvnäs, Sweden
- Died: 8 February 2008 (aged 87); Stockholm, Sweden
- Other name: Eva Elisabet Lampell
- Education: Royal Dramatic Theatre
- Occupations: Actress & Author
- Years active: 1942–1970
- Spouse: Sven Lampell (m. 1944; died 2007)
- Children: 2 sons

Eva Elisabet Dahlbeck (8 March 1920 – 8 February 2008) was a Swedish stage, film, and television actress. She received a Cannes Film Festival Award for Best Actress for her performance in the film Brink of Life (1958). Dahlbeck retired from acting in 1970 and became an author.

== Biography ==
Eva Dahlbeck was born in Saltsjö-Duvnäs near Stockholm. She attended the prestigious Royal Dramatic Training Academy from 1941 to 1944, and acted on the Theatre's stage from 1944 to 1964. She made her film debut in the role of Botilla in Ride Tonight! (Rid i natt!, 1942).

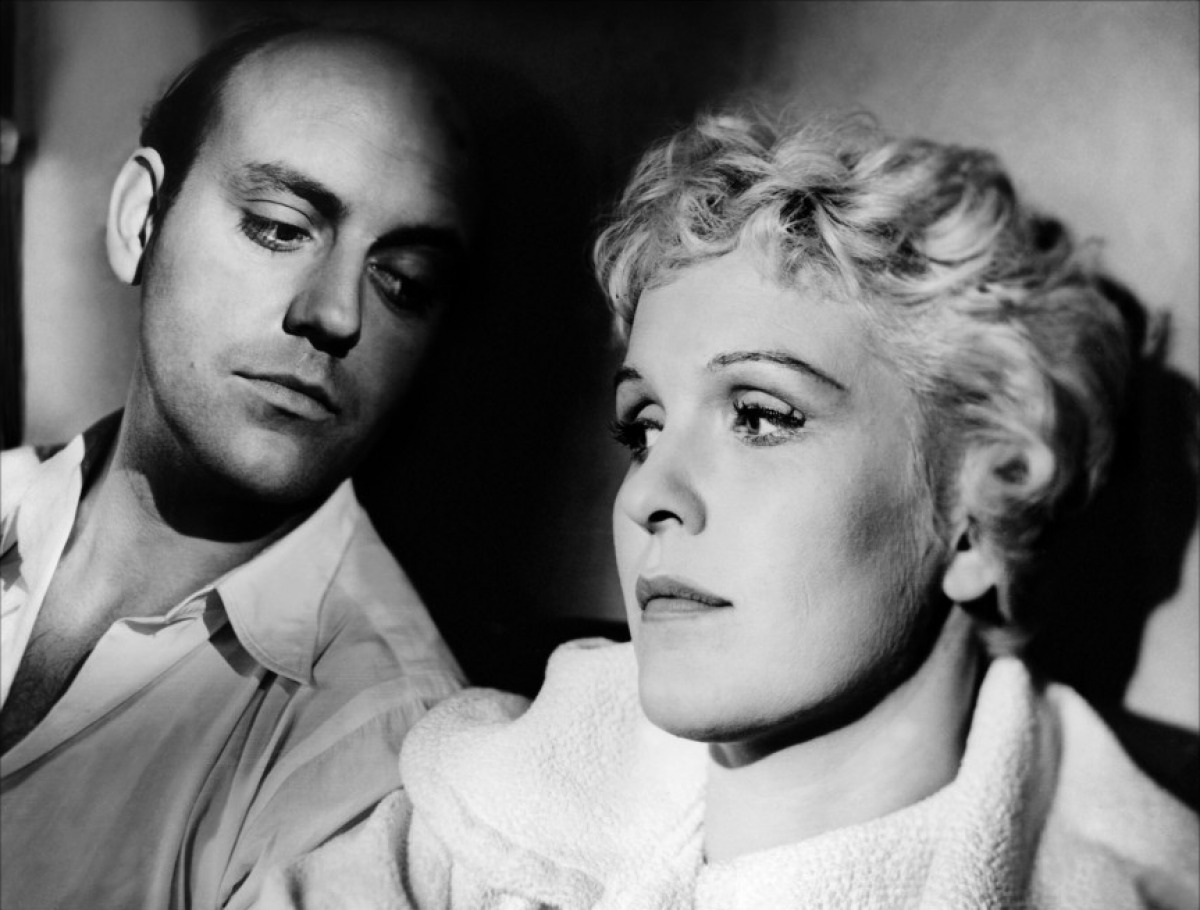
Dahlbeck and Ulf Palme in the film Dreams (1955)

Among her roles in Swedish films were the shrewd celebrity reporter Vivi in Love Goes Up and Down (Kärlek och störtlopp, 1946), the working-class mother Rya-Rya in the drama Only a Mother (Bara en mor, 1949); Mrs. Larsson, the warmhearted mother of seven in the popular children's film Kastrullresan (1950), and the young primary school teacher in Gustaf Molander's Trots (1952), a film with a screenplay by Vilgot Sjöman. In the mid-1950s Dahlbeck was one of Sweden's most popular and successful actresses. She became internationally known for her strong female leads in a number of Ingmar Bergman's films, in particular his comedies Secrets of Women (1952), A Lesson in Love (1954) and Smiles of a Summer Night (1955). In 1965 she won the award for Best Actress at the 2nd Guldbagge Awards for her role in the film The Cats (Kattorna, 1965). She also had a role in Agnès Varda's Les Créatures in 1966.

In the 1960s, Dahlbeck moved away from acting as she started to write. She retired from the stage in 1964 and made her final appearance on screen in the Danish film Tintomara (1970). She published several novels and poems in her native Sweden, and wrote the screenplay for Arne Mattsson's dark film Yngsjömordet (The Yngsjö murder) in 1966.

Dahlbeck married Sven Lampell, an air force officer, in 1944. The couple had two children. She lived out the last years of her life in Hässelby Villastad, Stockholm, where she died at age 87.

== Awards ==
- 1961 - Eugene O'Neill Award for her stage work.

== Filmography ==
- Only a Woman (1941) as Guest at the masquerade
- The Talk of the Town (1941) as Dancing woman
- Ride Tonight! (1942) as Botilla
- Count Only the Happy Moments (1944) as Hedvig
- Oss tjuvar emellan eller En burk ananas (1945) as Astrid
- Black Roses (1945) as Per Bergström's wife
- The Serious Game (1945) as Dagmar Randel
- Brita in the Merchant's House (1946) as Brita
- Love Goes Up and Down (1946) as Vivi Boström
- Meeting in the Night (1946) as Marit
- The Key and the Ring (1947) as Eva Berg
- Two Women (1947) as Sonja Bergman
- The People of Simlang Valley (1947) as Ingrid Folkesson
- Each to His Own Way (1948) as Karin Brofeldt
- Lars Hård (1948) as Inga
- Girl from the Mountain Village (1948) as Isa
- Eva (1948) as Susanne
- Woman in White (1949) as Solveig Rygård
- Only a Mother (1949) as Maria, aka Rya-Rya
- Fiancée for Hire (1950) as Margit Berg
- Jack of Hearts (1950) as Gun Lovén
- The Saucepan Journey (1950) as Mamma Larsson
- In the Arms of the Sea (1951) as Lucie
- Sköna Helena (1951) as Helena
- Carson City (1952) as Gun
- U-Boat 39 (1952) as Maria Friberg
- Defiance (1952) as Teacher
- Secrets of Women (1952) as Karin
- Barabbas (1953) as The Mother
- The Shadow (1953) as Vivianne
- The Village (1953) as Wanda Piwonska
- House of Women (1953) as Isa
- The Chieftain of Göinge (1953) as Kristina Ulfstand
- Foreign Intrigue (1953–1955, TV Series) as Barbara Vale / Nina Richter / Hilda / Nurse
- A Lesson in Love (1954) as Marianne Erneman
- Voyage in the Night (1955) as Birgitta Lundberg
- Dreams (1955) as Susanne
- Paradise (1955) as Ulla Karlsson
- Smiles of a Summer Night (1955) as Desiree Armfeldt
- Tarps Elin (1956) as Elin Tarp
- Last Pair Out (1956) as Susanna Dahlin
- Encounters in the Twilight (1957) as Irma Sköld
- Summer Place Wanted (1957) as Ingeborg Dahlström
- Brink of Life (1958) as Stina Andersson
- A Matter of Morals (1960) as Eva Walderman
- Kärlekens decimaler (1960) as Astrid
- Tre önskningar (1960) as Adèle Linton
- Ticket to Paradise (1962) as Rita Carol
- The Counterfeit Traitor (1962) as Ingrid Erickson
- All These Women (1964) as Adelaide
- Loving Couples (1964) as Marta Alleus
- Morianna (1965) as Anna Vade
- The Cats (1965) as Marta Alleus
- Les Créatures (1966) as Michele Quellec
- Woman of Darkness (1966) as Screenwriter
- Hagbard and Signe (1967) as The Queen
- People Meet and Sweet Music Fills the Heart (1967) as Devah Sørensen
- Markurells i Wadköping (1968–1969, TV Mini-Series) as Fru Markurell
- A Day at the Beach (1970) as Cafe Proprietress
- Tintomara (1970) as Baroness (final film role)

== Novels ==
- 1964: Hem till kaos ("Home To Chaos")
- 1965: Sista spegeln: preludier ("The Last Mirror: Preludes")
- 1966: Den sjunde natten: detaljer (The Seventh Night: Details")
- 1967: Domen ("The Verdict")
- 1972: Med seende ögon ("With Eyes That See")
- 1974: Hjärtslagen ("The Heartbeats")
- 1976: Saknadens dal
- 1979: Maktspråket ("The Language of Power")
- 1980: I våra tomma rum ("In Our Empty Rooms")
- 1988: Serveto och den eviga elden ("Serveto and the Eternal Flame")
- 1991: Vapenhandlarens död: ett reportage från insidan ("The Armsdealer's Death: An Inside Story")
- 1996: På kärlekens villkor: en vandring i ett laglöst land
- 1999: Sökarljus ("Searching Lights")

== Notes ==
- "Eva Dahlbeck Dies at 87; Actress in Bergman Films". The New York Times. Associated Press. February 18, 2008.
- Svenskfilmdatabas.se (Swedish Film Database)
