= Sune Waldimir =

Swedish composer

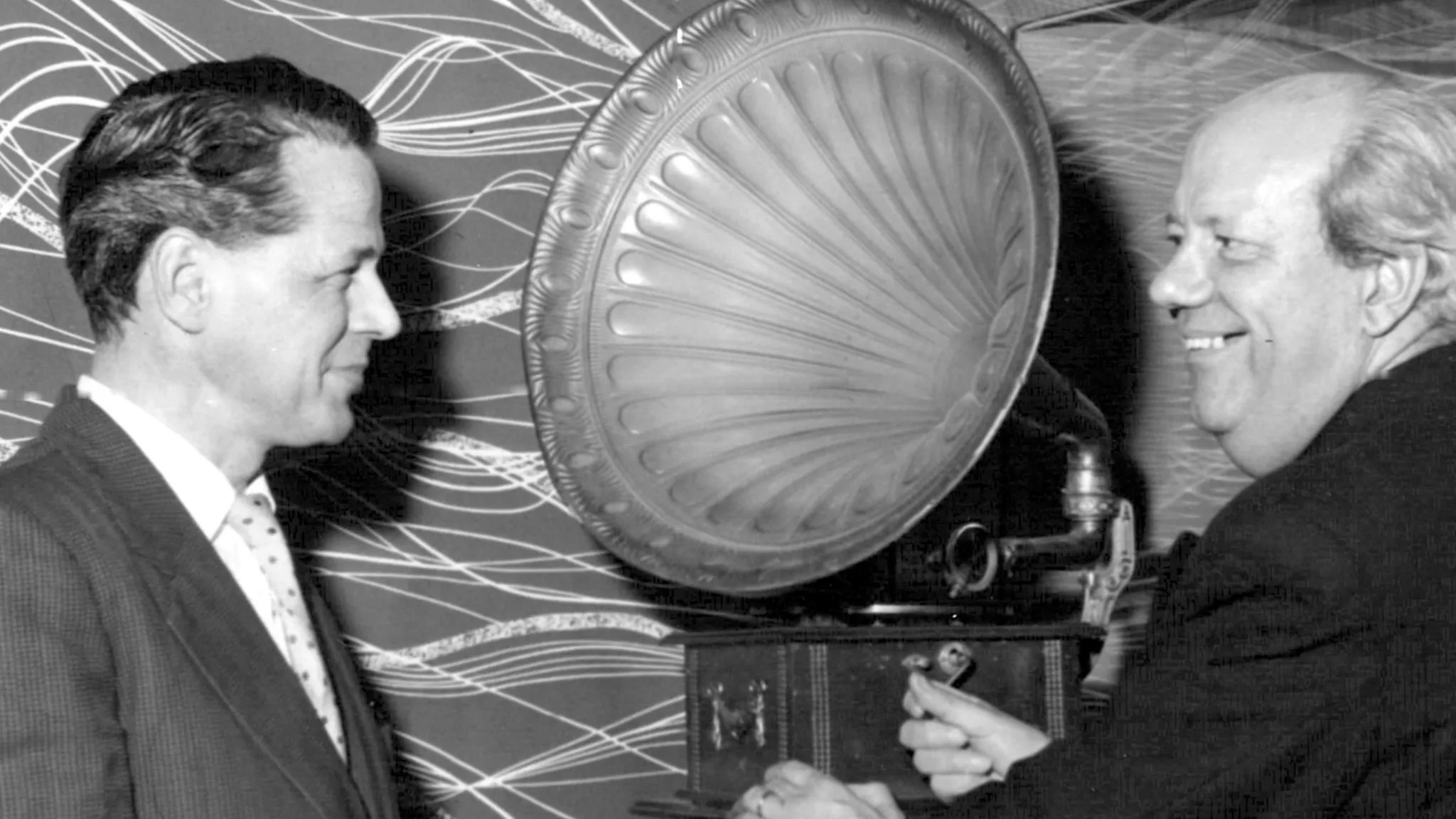
- Sune Waldimir and Lasse Nordberg in 1957
- Born: 15 November 1907; Västerås, Sweden
- Died: 9 December 1967 (aged 60); Stockholm, Sweden
- Occupation: Composer
- Years active: 1931–1957 (film)

Sune Waldimir (15 November 1907 – 9 December 1967) was a Swedish composer known particularly for his film scores.

== Selected filmography ==
- Kanske en gentleman (1935)
- The Boys of Number Fifty Seven (1935)
- The Lady Becomes a Maid (1936)
- The Girls of Uppakra (1936)
- Poor Millionaires (1936)
- Life Begins Today (1939)
- Oh, What a Boy! (1939)
- The Sixth Shot (1943)
- Som folk är mest (1944)
- Dolly Takes a Chance (1944)
- Fram för lilla Märta (1945)
- Jolanta the Elusive Pig (1945)
- The Österman Brothers' Virago (1945)
- Kungliga patrasket (1945)
- Money (1946)
- Desire (1946)
- The Balloon (1946)
- The Key and the Ring (1947)
- No Way Back (1947)
- Song of Stockholm (1947)
- Two Women (1947)
- Lilla Märta kommer tillbaka (1948)
- Private Bom (1948)
- The Girl from the Third Row (1949)
- Playing Truant (1949)
- The Motor Cavaliers (1950)
- Andersson's Kalle (1950)
- The Nuthouse (1951)
- My Friend Oscar (1951)
- Resan till dej (1953)
- Young Summer (1954)
- Laugh Bomb (1954)
- Galapagos (1955)
- Darling of Mine (1955)
- Mother Takes a Vacation (1957)
- The Koster Waltz (1958)

== Bibliography ==
- Klossner, Michael. The Europe of 1500-1815 on Film and Television: A Worldwide Filmography of Over 2550 Works, 1895 Through 2000. McFarland & Company, 2002.
- Petrucci, Antonio. Twenty Years of Cinema in Venice. International Exhibition of Cinematographic Art, 1952.
