= Heaven and Pancake =

1958 film

- Directed by: Hasse Ekman
- Written by: Hasse Ekman, Gösta Stevens
- Produced by: Allan Ekelund
- Starring: Sickan Carlsson; Hasse Ekman; Gunnar Björnstrand
- Cinematography: Martin Bodin
- Edited by: Ingemar Ejve
- Music by: Charles Redland
- Production company: Svensk Filmindustri
- Distributed by: Svensk Filmindustri
- Release date: 2 November 1959
- Running time: 92 minutes
- Country: Sweden
- Language: Swedish

Heaven and Pancake (Swedish: Himmel och pannkaka) is a 1959 Swedish comedy film directed by Hasse Ekman and starring Sickan Carlsson, Ekman, Gunnar Björnstrand and Lena Granhagen. It was shot at the Råsunda Studios in Stockholm. The film's sets were designed by the art director P.A. Lundgren. It is the sequel to Seventh Heaven.

== Plot summary ==
We follow the now happily married couple Lovisa Sundelius and Villy Lorens. Lovisa is a doctor, and Villy is a popular radio host. But now he will instead lead an entertainment program with quizzes on TV, called "Land in sight"

== Cast ==
- Sickan Carlsson as Lovisa Sundelius, doctor
- Hasse Ekman as Villy Lorens, TV-show host of the program "Land in sight", Lovisas husband
- Gunnar Björnstrand as Ernst C:son Kruuse
- Lena Granhagen as Susanna "Suss" Wikander
- Sigge Fürst as Frans Björkeby
- Stig Järrel as Sture "Ture" Turesson
- Sif Ruud as Franceska Larsson
- Hugo Björne as Manfred Fredriksson
- Hjördis Petterson as Mrs Jägerström, journalist
- Ulf Johanson as Alvar Sund
- Bellan Roos as Inez, Lovisas and Villys maid
- Sune Mangs as Torbjörn Lindelöf, photographer
- Gösta Prüzelius as Captain on the bananaboat
- Hanny Schedin as Mrs. Fredriksson
- Sven-Axel Carlsson as Photographer

== Bibliography ==
- Iverson, Gunnar, Soderbergh Widding, Astrid & Soila, Tytti. Nordic National Cinemas. Routledge, 2005.
- Qvist, Per Olov & von Bagh, Peter. Guide to the Cinema of Sweden and Finland. Greenwood Publishing Group, 2000.
