= Liane Linden =

Swedish actress (1920–2014)

- Born: 1 April 1920; Gothenburg, Sweden
- Died: 30 November 2014 (aged 94); Stockholm, Sweden
- Occupation: Actress
- Years active: 1939–1963 (film)

Liane Linden (April 1, 1920 – November 30, 2014) was a Swedish film and stage actress. She appeared in the 1939 British crime film The Arsenal Stadium Mystery.

== Selected filmography ==
- The Arsenal Stadium Mystery (1939)
- Lärarinna på vift (1941)
- Lasse-Maja (1941)
- How to Tame a Real Man (1941)
- Blizzard (1944)
- Moon Over Hellesta (1956)
- Hide and Seek (1963)

== Bibliography ==
- Mayer, Geoff. Guide to British Cinema. Greenwood Publishing Group, 2003.
- Richards, Jeffrey. Thorold Dickinson: The Man and His Films. Croom Helm, 1986.
