= While the Door Was Locked =

1946 film

- Directed by: Hasse Ekman
- Written by: Hasse Ekman
- Produced by: Europafilm
- Starring: Tollie Zellman; Olof Winnerstrand; Inga Landgré; Marianne Löfgren; Hasse Ekman; Gunn Wållgren; Gunnar Björnstrand; Gösta Cederlund
- Music by: Miff Görling; Nathan Görling
- Release date: 1946
- Running time: 89 minutes
- Country: Sweden
- Language: Swedish

While the Door Was Locked (Swedish:Medan porten var stängd) is a 1946 Swedish drama film directed by Hasse Ekman.

It was shot at AB Europa Studio in Sundbyberg and on location around Stockholm.

== Plot summary ==
In an apartment building at an address in Östermalm, Stockholm the residents and their guests each play their part in a night full of drama, while the door is locked.

== Cast ==
- Tollie Zellman as Cora Anker, actress
- Olof Winnerstrand as Hugo Sjöwall
- Inga Landgré as Birgit Ström
- Marianne Löfgren as fröken Bojan Olsson, prostitute
- Hasse Ekman as Torsten "Totte" von Breda, Captain
- Gunn Wållgren as Marianne Sahlén, flight attendant
- Gunnar Björnstrand as Erik Sahlén
- Gösta Cederlund as Karl-Otto Rosander
- Nils Kihlberg as Anders Holmkvist
- Hjördis Petterson as Frida Johansson, the porter's wife
- Douglas Håge as Emil Johansson, the porter
- Hampe Faustman as Tomas Ekberg, journalist
- Stig Järrel as Bojan's customer
- Tord Stål as Kastgren, police
- Gunnar Öhlund as Erlandson, police
