= The Jazz Boy =

1958 film

- Directed by: Hasse Ekman
- Written by: Hasse Ekman; Åke Söderblom; Gösta Stevens
- Produced by: Allan Ekelund
- Starring: Hasse Ekman; Maj-Britt Nilsson; Elof Ahrle; Georg Funkquist
- Cinematography: Martin Bodin
- Edited by: Oscar Rosander
- Music by: Charles Redland
- Production company: Svensk Filmindustri
- Distributed by: Svensk Filmindustri
- Release date: 6 October 1958
- Running time: 104 minutes
- Country: Sweden
- Language: Swedish

The Jazz Boy (Swedish: Jazzgossen) is a 1958 Swedish musical film directed and by Hasse Ekman and starring Ekman, Maj-Britt Nilsson, Elof Ahrle and Georg Funkquist. The film was an attempt to make a nostalgic cavalcade of the Swedish entertainment scene of the 1920s and 1930s, and featured many songs from that era. The film's sets were designed by the art director P.A. Lundgren.

== Cast ==
- Maj-Britt Nilsson as Karin Ingel-Anker
- Hasse Ekman as Teddy Anker
- Elof Ahrle as Mille Bergström
- Bengt Ekerot as Erik Jonsson
- Georg Funkquist as Allan Örtengren
- Per Lindquist as Lars-Erik
- Meg Westergren as Madeleine
- Torsten Lilliecrona as Guest at Teddy's party
- Curt Masreliez as Hubbe
- Einar Fagstad as himself
- Wiktor Andersson as Stage Guard
- Ingvar Kjellson as Guest at Teddy's party
- Hans Strååt as The Director of 'Kameliadamen'
- Ragnar Klange as Visitor at auction
- Rune Halvarsson
- Elsa Ebbesen as Svea
- Gunnar Olsson as Film director
- Börje Nyberg as Sound engineer
- Gösta Prüzelius as Film editor
- Ulf Johansson as Lightmaster at China
- Sven-Axel Carlsson as Electrician at China
- Per Sjöstrand as Armand
- Håkan Serner as Messenger
- Göthe Grefbo as Publicity Manager
- Sune Mangs as Jerka
- Alf Östlund as Jazzgosse
- Mille Schmidt as Jazzgosse
- Ulla-Carin Rydén as Ms. Holm
- Karl Gerhard as himself
- Sigge Fürst as Ernst Rolf
- Sven Jerring (voice)
- Gunnar Skoglund as himself (voice)
- Manne Berggren as himself (voice)
- Gunnar 'Knas' Lindkvist as Jazzgosse
- Anita Lindblom as Lily
- Wilma Malmlöf as Tekla,

Zarah Leander and Einar Söderbäck appear uncredited.

== Soundtrack ==
- Zarah Leander - "Hela Livet är en Glad Operett" (Music by Jules Sylvain, lyrics by Åke Söderblom)
- Karl Gerhard - "Jazzgossen (En lille Rystedans)" (Composed by Edvard Brink, lyrics by Karl-Gerhard)
- Sigge Fürst and Einar Fagstad - "Från Frisco till Kap eller Alla jäntor ä lika" (Composed by Ernst Rolf, lyrics by Martin Nilsson)
- Maj Lindström - "I min blommiga blå krinolin" (In My Sweet Little Alice Blue Gown) (Composed by Harry Tierney, lyrics by Anita Halldén as S.S. Wilson)
- "Shimmy"
- Sigge Fürst and choir - "Bättre och bättre dag för dag" (I'm Getting Better Every Day) (Composed by Mark Strong lyrics by Anita Halldén as S.S. Wilson and Karl-Ewert Christenson)
- Maj Lindström and Per Lindquist - "Säg det i toner" (Composed by Jules Sylvain, lyrics by Karl-Ewert Christenson)
- Helge Lindberg - "De' ä' grabben me' chokla' i"
- Sigge Fürst - "Din vår är min vår" (Composed by Georg Enders)
- Karl-Gerhard - "Hurra för det lilla som är kvar" (Composed by Carl Gustaf Hulthe, lyrics by Karl-Gerhard)
- Karl-Gerhard - "Den ökända hästen från Troja" (Mars vesiolych rebjat) (Composed by Isaak Dunayevsky, lyrics by Karl-Gerhard, arrangement by Lille Bror Söderlundh)
- Maj-Britt Nilsson - "Min Soldat" (Written by Nils Perne)
- "Calle Schewens vals" (Composed by Evert Taube, original lyrics by Evert Taube, new lyrics by Karl-Gerhard)
- Alice Babs - "Swing it Magistern"

== Bibliography ==
- Gustafsson, Fredrik. The Man from the Third Row: Hasse Ekman, Swedish Cinema and the Long Shadow of Ingmar Bergman. Berghahn Books, 2016.
