= Torsten Winge =

Swedish actor

- Torsten Winge, c. 1913
- Born: 10 May 1886; Norrköping, Sweden
- Died: 6 May 1969 (aged 82); Stockholm, Sweden
- Occupation: Actor
- Years active: 1917–1961

Torsten Winge (10 May 1886 – 6 May 1969) was a Swedish actor. He appeared in more than 50 films between 1917 and 1961.

== Selected filmography ==
- Robinson i skärgården (1920)
- Thomas Graal's Ward (1922)
- Where the Lighthouse Flashes (1924)
- The Lady of the Camellias (1925)
- She Is the Only One (1926)
- Ulla, My Ulla (1930)
- For Her Sake (1930)
- Kanske en gentleman (1935)
- The People of Småland (1935)
- Walpurgis Night (1935)
- Conscientious Objector Adolf (1936)
- The Wedding Trip (1936)
- Thunder and Lightning (1938)
- Nothing But the Truth (1939)
- Bashful Anton (1940)
- Her Melody (1940)
- The Train Leaves at Nine (1941)
- Lucky Young Lady (1941)
- Lasse-Maja (1941)
- The Ghost Reporter (1941)
- Poor Ferdinand (1941)
- Pinocchio (1941) (Original Swedish dubbing)
- Dangerous Ways (1942)
- The Heavenly Play (1942)
- Lyckan kommer (1942)
- Mister Collins' Adventure (1943)
- Live Dangerously (1944)
- The Night Watchman's Wife (1947)
- John og Irene (1949)
- Realm of Man (1949)
- Playing Truant (1949)
- The Quartet That Split Up (1950)
- Fun and Fancy Free (1950) (Swedish dubbing)
- Seventh Heaven (1956)
- The Girl in Tails (1956)
- Musik ombord (1958)
- The Lady in Black (1958)
