= Flames in the Dark =

- Directed by: Hasse Ekman
- Written by: Hasse Ekman
- Produced by: Lorens Marmstedt
- Starring: Edvin Adolphson; Inga Tidblad; Stig Järrel; Hugo Björne
- Music by: Stig Hansson
- Distributed by: Terrafilm
- Release date: 2 March 1942 (Sweden)
- Running time: 94 minutes
- Country: Sweden
- Language: Swedish

Flames in the Dark (Swedish: Lågor i dunklet) is a 1942 Swedish drama film directed by Hasse Ekman.

== Plot summary ==
Rolf Nordmark and Eva Berg both work as teachers at Ringsala boarding school. Rolf has long been in love with Eva, but when the semester begins again in the fall, he learns that she is to leave her job and marry a newly hired teacher at the school, Birger Sjögren. Rolf and Eva continues their friendship, but Birger who is very jealous thinks that it is more than that and becomes more and more angry.

A series of mysterious fires begins to take place around the school. Per Sahlén, one of the students, is sure that he has seen the severe Latin teacher Sjögren setting fire to a barn. But can he convince the trusted and psychologically skilled teacher Nordmark of his suspicions in time to stop a disaster?

== Cast ==
- Edvin Adolphson as Rolf Nordmark, Schoolmaster
- Stig Järrel as Birger Sjögren, Schoolmaster
- Inga Tidblad as Eva Berg
- Hugo Björne as Edvard Bergfelt, Principal at Ringsala
- Linnéa Hillberg as Magda Bergfelt, Principal's Wife
- Hasse Ekman as Per Sahlén, Student
- Agneta Lagerfeldt as Anne-Marie Ström, Waitress
- Hilda Borgström as Anna Charlotta Sjögren, Birger Sjögren's mother
