= Perhaps a Poet =

1933 film

- Directed by: Lorens Marmstedt
- Written by: Ragnar Josephson (play); Torsten Flodén
- Produced by: Lorens Marmstedt
- Starring: Gösta Ekman; Gunnar Olsson; Karin Kavli
- Cinematography: Ragnar Westfelt
- Music by: Willard Ringstrand
- Production company: Nordisk Filmproduktion
- Distributed by: Terrafilm
- Release date: 24 February 1933
- Running time: 78 minutes
- Country: Sweden
- Language: Swedish

Perhaps a Poet (Swedish: Kanske en diktare) is a 1933 Swedish drama film directed and produced by Lorens Marmstedt and starring Gösta Ekman, Gunnar Olsson and Karin Kavli. The film is based on the 1932 play of the same name by Ragnar Josephson.

== Cast ==
- Gösta Ekman as Filip, rockvaktmästare
- Gunnar Olsson as Viding
- Karin Kavli as Jane
- Hjalmar Peters as Kurtz
- Hugo Björne as Domaren
- Hjördis Petterson as Cigarrfröken
- Hugo Tranberg as Källarmästaren
- Olof Widgren as Notarien
- Eric Abrahamsson as Irate Guest at the Restaurant
- Alice Carlsson as Restaurant Guest Putting on Lipstick
- Calle Flygare as Waiter
- Bengt Janzon as Bisittare i rätten
- Helge Kihlberg as Older Waiter
- Ernst Marcusson as Court Secretary
- Holger Sjöberg as Fat Guest at the Restaurant

== Bibliography ==
- Qvist, Per Olov & von Bagh, Peter. Guide to the Cinema of Sweden and Finland. Greenwood Publishing Group, 2000.
