= Ombyte av tåg =

1943 film by Hasse Ekman

- Directed by: Hasse Ekman
- Written by: Hasse Ekman
- Produced by: Lorens Marmstedt
- Starring: Sonja Wigert; Hasse Ekman; Georg Rydeberg; Karin Kavli
- Music by: Sune Östling; Miff Görling
- Distributed by: Terrafilm
- Release date: 30 January 1943 (Sweden)
- Running time: 92 minutes
- Country: Sweden
- Language: Swedish

Ombyte av tåg (Change of Train) is a 1943 Swedish drama film directed by Hasse Ekman.

== Plot ==
Inga Dahl, an unemployed actress, and Joakim Lundell are a couple from times past, who happen to meet many years later by chance on a train station. They drink coffee together; flashbacks show their love saga from the beginning to the end.

== Cast ==
- Sonja Wigert as Inga Dahl
- Hasse Ekman as Joakim "Kim" Lundell
- Georg Rydeberg as Leo Waller, actor
- Karin Kavli as Vera, actress
- Georg Funkquist as Hugo Linde, Theatre manager
- Ludde Gentzel as Anderson, Theatre doorman
- Torsten Hillberg as herr Lundell, Kims father
- Gull Natorp as Rut Lundell, Kims mother
- Barbro Flodquist as Ebba, actress
- Gabriel Alw as doctor
- Anna-Stina Wåglund as Waitress at the Railway station
- Gösta Bodin as Angry Visitor at the Theatre
- Agda Helin as Angry Man's Wife
- Willy Peters as Rehearsing Actor
- Astrid Bodin as Waitress at the Railway station
- Märta Torén as Young Woman in the Audience
