= Karin Kavli =

Swedish actress (1906–1990)

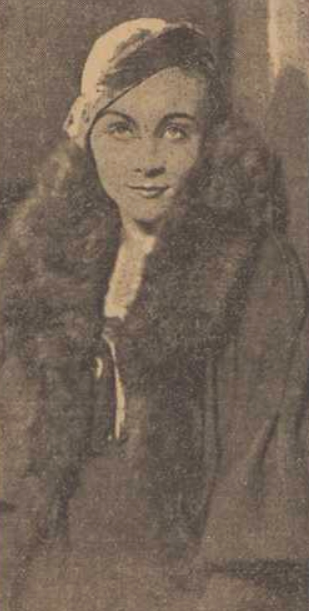
- Born: Karin Kristina Margareta Carlson; 21 June 1906; Stockholm, Sweden
- Died: 8 March 1990 (aged 83)
- Occupation: Actress
- Years active: 1932-1983

Karin Kavli (born Karin Kristina Margareta Carlson; 21 June 1906 – 8 March 1990) was a Swedish stage and film actress and theatre director. She appeared in 20 films between 1933 and 1983.

== Selected filmography ==
- Perhaps a Poet (1933)
- Under False Flag (1935)
- Walpurgis Night (1935)
- A Woman's Face (1938)
- Wanted (1939)
- Only a Woman (1941)
- The Yellow Clinic (1942)
- Som du vill ha mej (1943)
- Ön (1966)
- All These Women (1964)
