= Stig Hansson =

Swedish politician

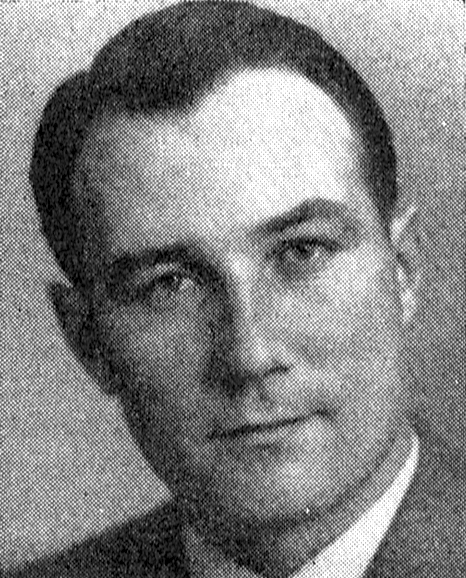
Image of Stig Folke Hansson

Stig Hansson (1880–1963) was a Swedish politician. He was a member of the Centre Party.
