= Banketten =

1948 film

- Directed by: Hasse Ekman
- Written by: Hasse Ekman
- Produced by: Lorens Marmstedt, Terrafilm
- Starring: Ernst Eklund; Elsa Carlsson; Sture Lagerwall; Eva Henning; Hasse Ekman; Sven Lindberg; Birger Malmsten
- Music by: Charles Wildman
- Release date: 1948
- Running time: 106 min
- Country: Sweden
- Language: Swedish

Banketten (English: The Banquet) is a 1948 Swedish drama film which is directed by Hasse Ekman.

== Plot summary ==
Jacob Cotten is just about to turn 60 years old and his prominent family will hold a banquet in his honour to celebrate the occasion. At this time his youngest son announce that he will not inherit his father's business and money, because he is a communist and want to make it on his own.

Cottens daughter lives in a distorted marriage full of violence, arguments, abuse, and alcohol. The eldest son lives like a spoiled parasite on his rich family and has no intent to change his ways. How will the banquet go and who will inherit the business and the fortune, that both created and destroyed the Cotten family?

== Cast ==
- Ernst Eklund as Jacob Cotten, banker
- Elsa Carlsson as Agnes, his wife
- Sture Lagerwall as Pierre Cotten, their son
- Eva Henning as Victoria "Vica" Stenbrott, Jacobs and Agnes daughter
- Hasse Ekman as Hugo Stenbrott, Vicas husband
- Sven Lindberg as Ivar, Jacobs and Agnes son, student
- Birger Malmsten as Rex Lundgren, medicine student
- Hilda Borgström as aunt Alberta
- Jan Molander as Sixten, friend of Vica and Hugos
- Barbro Flodquist as Kate, friend of Vica and Hugos
- Ragnar Arvedson as staff at NK
- Solveig Lagström as Siri, maid at Vica and Hugos
