= Fram för lilla Märta =

- Directed by: Hasse Ekman
- Written by: Hasse Ekman
- Starring: Stig Järrel; Hasse Ekman; Thor Modéen; Elsie Albiin; Agneta Lagerfeldt; Gull Natorp
- Cinematography: Hilding Bladh
- Edited by: Lennart Wallén
- Music by: Kai Gullmar; Sune Waldimir
- Release date: 29 September 1945 (Sweden)
- Running time: 86 minutes
- Country: Sweden
- Language: Swedish

Fram för lilla Märta or På livets ödesvägar is a 1945 Swedish comedy film directed by Hasse Ekman and starring Stig Järrel and Hasse Ekman.

== Plot ==
The story takes its beginning in 2006 in Sweden, sixty years in the future from the present time at the making of the film. The elderly Sture Letterström (Stig Järrel) travels to Lillköping together with a little girl who is his only living relative. They visit a statue of the famous cellist Märta Letterström.

Sitting by the base of the statue, Sture tells his life story to his relative. The story begins in the 1940s, when the unemployed cellist Sture travels around the country to find work. He is unable to find a job, but his best friend Kurre (Hasse Ekman) spots an advert where a ladies' trio seeks a new cello player. Kurre convinces Sture to dress up as a lady, and he gets the job. Sture, as his female alter ego 'Märta', travels to the little country town of Lillköping with the two other members of the trio, the sisters Inga (Elsie Albiin) and Barbro (Agneta Lagerfeldt). Kurre, pretending to be Märta's fiancé, also spends the summer in Lillköping, and the two fall in love with the sisters. 'Märta' is admonished by his strict landlady (played by Julia Caesar) for visiting Kurre in his room, and he has to struggle to avoid being found out by Inga and Barbro.

'Märta' makes friends in Lillköping and becomes a women's rights advocate. When the parliamentary election takes place, 'she' runs for office and wins, and lobbies for rights for women in the Riksdag. Meanwhile, in Lillköping, Kurre has told Barbro that 'Märta' is actually a man, and when Sture returns after a successful term in parliament, he finds out that Inga knows his secret. They stage an accident where 'Märta' drowns, and the grateful inhabitants of Lillköping erect the statue where, 60 years later, Sture tells his story to his great-granddaughter.

== Cast ==
- Stig Järrel as Sture Letterström
- Hasse Ekman as Kurre Swenson
- Elsie Albiin as Inga Bergström
- Agneta Lagerfeldt as Barbro Bergström (as Agneta Lagerfelt)
- Douglas Håge as Tobias Granlund
- Gull Natorp as Mrs. Louise Granlund
- Margit Andelius as Ms. Wiklund
- Julia Cæsar as Ms. Fahlén
