= Kungliga patrasket =

1945 film

- Directed by: Hasse Ekman
- Written by: Hasse Ekman
- Produced by: Lorens Marmstedt, Terrafilm
- Starring: Edvin Adolphson; Ester Roeck-Hansen; Hasse Ekman; Eva Henning; Olof Winnerstrand; Hilda Borgström
- Music by: Sune Waldimir
- Release date: 19 January 1945
- Running time: 117 min
- Country: Sweden
- Language: Swedish

Kungliga patrasket (English: The Royal Rabble) is a 1945 Swedish drama film directed by Hasse Ekman. Ekman also wrote the script for the film, inspired by his father, Gösta Ekman and the Barrymore family.

== Plot summary ==
The film revolves around the Anker family who are all actors and work together at Stefan Ankers theatre, Kungsteatern, in Stockholm. But different complications threaten to break up the happy union between three generations of Ankers. How will it end?

== Cast ==
- Edvin Adolphson as Stefan Anker, actor and theatre manager
- Ester Roeck-Hansen as Elisabet "Betty" Anker, his wife
- Hasse Ekman as Tommy Anker, his son
- Eva Henning as Monica Anker, his daughter
- Olof Winnerstrand as Karl-Hugo Anker, his father
- Hilda Borgström as Charlotta Anker, his mother
- Gudrun Brost as Sonja Swedje, his star
- Erik Strandmark as Göran Wallsenius, Monicas husband
- Stig Järrel as Stridström, author
- Hugo Tranberg as Ernst
- Bengt Ekerot as Rolf Eriksson, actor
- Wiktor "Kulörten" Andersson as Mille
- Meta Velander as Autograph girl
