= Sawdust and Tinsel =

1953 film by Ingmar Bergman

- Theatrical release poster
- Directed by: Ingmar Bergman
- Written by: Ingmar Bergman (uncredited)
- Produced by: Rune Waldekranz
- Starring: Åke Grönberg; Harriet Andersson; Hasse Ekman
- Cinematography: Hilding Bladh; Sven Nykvist
- Edited by: Carl-Olov Skeppstedt
- Distributed by: Sandrew-Baumanfilm AB
- Release date: 14 September 1953
- Running time: 93 minutes
- Country: Sweden
- Language: Swedish

Sawdust and Tinsel (Swedish: Gycklarnas afton, lit. 'Evening of the Jesters'; also released under the English titles Sunset of a Clown and The Naked Night) is a 1953 Swedish drama film written and directed by Ingmar Bergman.

== Plot ==
A travelling circus in Scania, Sweden, around the turn of the century. The circus owner and ringmaster, Albert, and his mistress, the equestrienne Anne, are facing financial difficulties and relationship problems. They are moving to a town where Albert's wife is living with his three sons; he has not been there for three years. A story is recounted where the clown, Frost, discovers that a beautiful lady bathing nude is actually his wife Alma. They seek help from a theatre director, who insults their appearance but lends them clothes. Anne encounters a man named Frans, who pursues her despite her rejection. The circus members face humiliation and horse confiscation from the police. Anne pleads with Albert not to leave her, but he remains determined to return to his wife. Anne turns to Frans for support, leading to a sexual encounter. Albert discovers the truth and confronts Anne, resulting in a chaotic scene. The circus prepares for a performance, during which Albert and Frans engage in a physical fight. Albert contemplates suicide but ultimately shoots the circus bear instead. The circus moves on, and Albert and Anne share a meaningful glance.

== Cast ==
- Åke Grönberg as Albert Johansson
- Harriet Andersson as Anne
- Hasse Ekman as Frans
- Anders Ek as Frost
- Gudrun Brost as Alma
- Annika Tretow as Agda
- Erik Strandmark as Jens
- Gunnar Björnstrand as Mr. Sjuberg
- Curt Löwgren as Blom

== Reception ==
It has a 92% approval rating from 12 reviews listed at Rotten Tomatoes. The film ranked 6th on Cahiers du Cinéma's Top 10 Films of the Year List in 1957. In 2012 it was voted one of the 25 best Swedish films of all time. The film was shown as part of an Ingmar Bergman Retrospective at the 61st Berlin International Film Festival in 2011.

On its release in 1953, the film was largely panned by Swedish critics and audiences who found the film "coarse and sweaty." Though the run was fairly successful in Stockholm despite the poor reviews, in the provinces of the country, it was largely ignored. It did receive some notoriety outside Sweden and played in a number of important festivals to good reviews.
