= Lilla Märta kommer tillbaka =

1948 film

- Directed by: Hasse Ekman
- Written by: Hasse Ekman
- Starring: Stig Järrel; Hasse Ekman; Tollie Zellman; Sten Larsson
- Music by: Sune Waldimir; Kai Gullmar
- Release date: 14 August 1948 (Sweden)
- Running time: 80 minutes
- Country: Sweden
- Language: Swedish

Lilla Märta kommer tillbaka or Grevinnans snedsteg eller Den vilda jakten efter det hemliga dokumentet (English: Little Märta Comes Back or The Countess slip or The Wild Hunt for the Secret Document) is a 1948 Swedish comedy film directed by Hasse Ekman and starring Stig Järrel and Hasse Ekman.

== Plot summary ==
Sture Letterström and Kurre Svensson take on the task of rescuing a secret document during World War II from a group of Swedish Nazis. Since both of them are known by the local Nazis, Sture again has to take on the role of Miss Märta Letterström, and Kurre also has to make use of his feminine side as well as a dress.

== Cast ==
- Stig Järrel as Sture Letterström/Ms. Märta Letterström
- Hasse Ekman as Curt "Kurre" Svensson/Ms. Elvira Pettersson
- Hugo Jacobson as Pontus Bruzell
- Tollie Zellman as Tora, his wife
- Brita Borg as Inga Bruzell, Pontus and Toras daughter
- Sten Larsson as doctor Gotthard Vogel, Nazi
- Douglas Håge as Peter Sonne, f.d. Pettersson, Nazi
- Charlie Almlöf as Charles-Emile Högquist
- Benkt-Åke Benktsson as doktor Bauerbrecht, Nazi
- Hjördis Petterson as Fräulein Schultze, Nazi
- Ernst Brunman as police Karlsson, Nazi
- Gunnar Björnstrand as captain
- Harald Emanuelsson as the captains chauffeur
- Margit Andelius as Ms. Synnergren, teacher, Nazi
