= One Swallow Does Not Make a Summer =

- Directed by: Hasse Ekman
- Written by: Hasse Ekman
- Produced by: Europafilm
- Starring: Eva Henning; Hasse Ekman; Sonja Wigert; Lauritz Falk
- Music by: Nathan Görling, Erik Baumann, Stig Holm
- Release date: 17 September 1947
- Running time: 88 min
- Country: Sweden
- Language: Swedish

One Swallow Does Not Make a Summer (Swedish: En fluga gör ingen sommar) is a 1947 Swedish comedy film directed by Hasse Ekman. The film starrs Eva Henning, Hasse Ekman, Sonja Wigert and Lauritz Falk.

== Cast ==
- Eva Henning as Inga Brantemo, secretary
- Hasse Ekman as Bertil Brantemo, writer, Inga's husband
- Sonja Wigert as Christina "Chris" Lovén
- Lauritz Falk as Berger
- Olof Winnerstrand as Lovén, Chris's father
- Katie Rolfsen as Agnes Karlsson, maid
- Douglas Håge as Granlund
- Margit Andelius as Miss Santesson
- Gunnar Björnstrand as a modernist writer
- Ulla Andreasson as Bettan, Bertil's sister
- Gull Natorp as Mrs. Andersson
- Charlie Almlöf as Oskar Andersson
- Astrid Bodin as Mrs. Lundgren
