= Hasse Ekman =

Swedish actor (1915–2004)

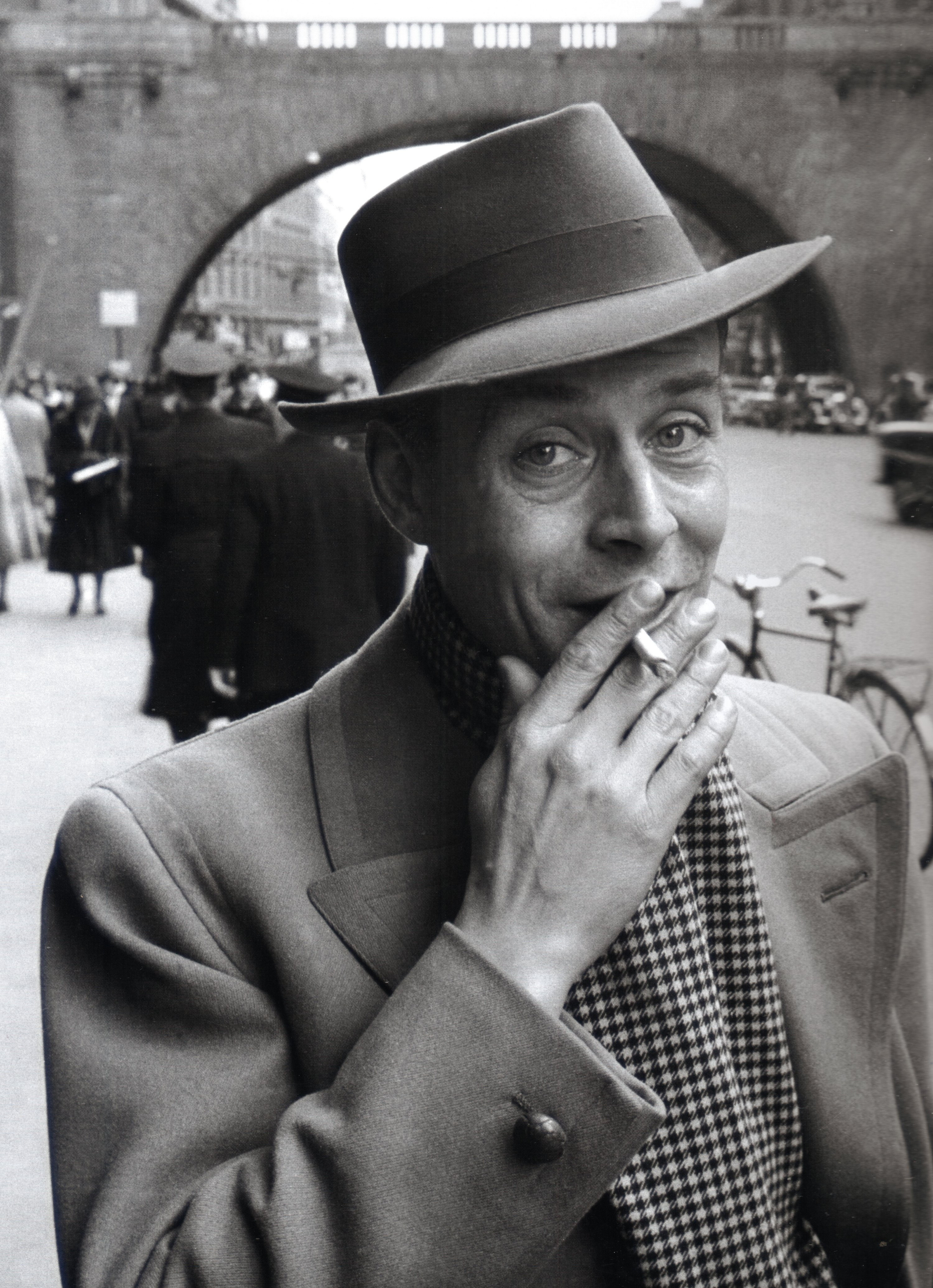
- Hasse Ekman in 1953.
- Born: Hans Gösta Ekman; 10 September 1915; Stockholm, Sweden
- Died: 15 February 2004 (aged 88); Marbella, Spain
- Occupations: Actor, director, writer, producer
- Years active: 1924–1964
- Spouses: Agneta Wrangel (m. 1938–1944) Eva Henning (m. 1946–1953) Tutta Rolf (m. 1953–1972) Viveca Trädgårdh (m. 1974–2004)
- Children: Gösta; Krister; Mikael; Stefan; Fam
- Parent(s): Gösta Ekman; Greta Ekman

Hasse Ekman (born Hans Gösta Ekman; 10 September 1915 – 15 February 2004) was a Swedish director, actor, writer and producer for film, stage and television.

== Biography ==
Hasse Ekman is probably Sweden's most successful and critically acclaimed film director from the period after Sjöström and Stiller and prior to Ingmar Bergman, peaking between the mid-1940s and 1950. He was greatly influenced by filmmaker Orson Welles and also by episodic-films. His most successful film as a director is often said to be the 1950 film Flicka och hyacinter (Girl with Hyacinths), a crime/mystery drama about a young woman committing suicide by hanging herself in her apartment. His 1957 film Summer Place Wanted was entered into the 1st Moscow International Film Festival.

Hasse Ekman is part of the prominent "Ekman acting family" in Sweden: He was the son of Swedish star actor Gösta Ekman (senior) and father of actor Gösta Ekman (junior), actor Stefan Ekman and stage/film director Mikael Ekman. He is the grandfather of actress Sanna Ekman.

As an actor Ekman appeared in most of his own films, as the leading man and in a number of strong supporting roles, and he also acted in three early Ingmar Bergman films (Prison, Thirst and Sawdust and Tinsel). He also played opposite his famous father in Intermezzo, the original Swedish 1936 film starring Ingrid Bergman as the female lead. Overall, he appeared in fifty Swedish films.

== Selected filmography ==
=== Director ===
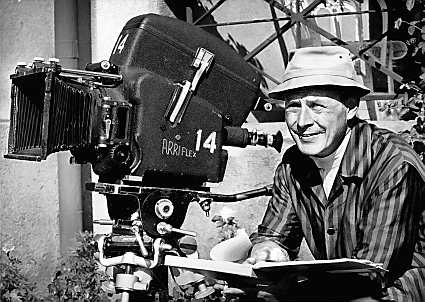
Hasse Ekman on set during filming, 1963

- 1940: Med dej i mina armar
- 1941: Första divisionen
- 1942: Flames in the Dark
- 1942: Lyckan kommer
- 1943: Ombyte av tåg
- 1943: The Sixth Shot
- 1944: Som folk är mest
- 1944: His Excellency
- 1945: Kungliga patrasket (The Royal Rabble)
- 1945: Vandring med månen (Wandering with the Moon)
- 1945: Fram för lilla Märta
- 1946: Meeting in the Night
- 1946: Interlude
- 1946: Medan porten var stängd (While the Door Was Locked)
- 1947: One Swallow Does Not Make a Summer (En fluga gör ingen sommar)
- 1948: Each to His Own Way
- 1948: Lilla Märta kommer tillbaka (Little Martin Returns)
- 1948: Banketten (The Banquet)
- 1949: Flickan från tredje raden (The Girl from the Third Row)
- 1950: Flicka och hyacinter (Girl with Hyacinths)
- 1950: The White Cat
- 1950: Jack of Hearts
- 1951: The Nuthouse
- 1952: The Firebird
- 1953: We Three Debutantes
- 1954: Gabrielle
- 1956: Ratataa
- 1956: Egen ingång
- 1956: Seventh Heaven
- 1957: Summer Place Wanted
- 1957: The Halo Is Slipping
- 1958: The Jazz Boy
- 1958: The Great Amateur
- 1959: Fröken Chic
- 1959: Heaven and Pancake
- 1960: On a Bench in a Park
- 1960: Kärlekens decimaler
- 1961: Rififi in Stockholm
- 1963: Min kära är en ros (My Love Is Like a Rose)
- 1964: Äktenskapsbrottaren
- 1965: Niklasons (TV Series)

=== screenwriting ===
- 1938: Thunder and Lightning
- 1940: Swing it, magistern!
- 1940: A Real Man
- 1940: Heroes in Yellow and Blue
- 1941: Magistrarna på sommarlov
- 1941: The Ghost Reporter
- 1943: Ombyte av tåg
- 1943: Men of the Navy
- 1945: Fram för lilla Märta
- 1945: Kungliga patrasket (The Royal Rabble)
- 1946: Medan porten var stängd (While the Door Was Locked)
- 1948: Love Goes Up and Down
- 1948: Each to His Own Way
- 1948: Banketten ("The Banquet")
- 1949: Flickan från tredje raden (The Girl from the Third Row)
- 1950: Girl with Hyacinths
- 1950: The Kiss on the Cruise
- 1953: Resan till dej
- 1956: Ratataa
- 1956: Egen ingång
- 1956: Seventh Heaven
- 1957: The Halo Is Slipping
- 1958: You Are My Adventure
- 1958: The Jazz Boy
- 1959: Fröken Chic

=== Actor ===
- 1924: Unga greven tar flickan och priset - Curious boy
- 1933: House Slaves - Kurt Rosenqvist
- 1933: En natt på Smygeholm - Leonard Barring
- 1936: Intermezzo - Åke Brandt
- 1937: John Ericsson - segraren vid Hampton Roads
- 1938: Thunder and Lightning - Bertil Bendix, Pontus sekreterare
- 1938: Med folket för fosterlandet - Hjalmar Karlsson
- 1939: Kadettkamrater - Bertil Winge
- 1940: Juninatten - Willy Wilson
- 1940: Med dej i mina armar - Svanberg's Secretary (voice, uncredited)
- 1941: Life Goes On - Ludvig
- 1941: Första divisionen - Fänrik Bråde
- 1942: Flames in the Dark - Per Sahlén, Student
- 1942: Lyckan kommer - Radioröst (voice, uncredited)
- 1943: Ombyte av tåg - Kim
- 1943: Life and Death - Kirre Granlund
- 1943: Sjätte skottet - Man med Marguerite på tågstationen (uncredited)
- 1944: En dag skall gry - Rutger von Brewitz
- 1944: I Am Fire and Air - Tore Ekström
- 1944: Stopp! Tänk på något annat - Karsten Kirsewetter
- 1945: Kungliga patrasket (The Royal Rabble) - Hans son
- 1945: Vandring med månen (Wandering with the Moon) - Ernst Törsleff
- 1945: Fram för lilla Märta - Kurre
- 1946: Interlude - Vilhelm Canitz
- 1946: Meeting in the Night - Åke
- 1946: While the Door Was Locked - Torsten v. Breda
- 1947: One Swallow Does Not Make a Summer - Bertil
- 1948: Each to His Own Way - Tage Sundell
- 1948: Lilla Märta kommer tillbaka - Fänriken
- 1948: Banketten (The Banquet) - Hugo
- 1949: Prison - Martin Grandé
- 1949: Flickan från tredje raden (The Girl from the Third Row) - Sture Anker
- 1949: Thirst - Dr. Rosengren
- 1950: Jack of Hearts - Anders Canitz
- 1951: The Nuthouse - Hans Hasseson Ekman / Fänrik Bråde / Kim (voice)
- 1953: We Three Debutantes - Narrator (voice, uncredited)
- 1953: Sawdust and Tinsel - Frans
- 1953: The Glass Mountain - Stellan Sylvester
- 1954: Dance in the Smoke - Gentleman in haystack (uncredited)
- 1954: The Yellow Squadron - Birger Wreting
- 1954: Gabrielle - Kjell Rodin
- 1956: Egen ingång - Sture Falk
- 1956: Seventh Heaven - Willy Lorens, radioprogramledare
- 1956: Ratataa - Klåd Tränger
- 1957: The Halo Is Slipping - Per-Axel Dahlander
- 1958: The Great Amateur - Max Wallby
- 1958: The Jazz Boy - Teddy Anker
- 1959: Fröken Chic - Buster Carell
- 1959: Heaven and Pancake - Villy Lorens
- 1960: Kärlekens decimaler - Karl Krister 'Charlie' Gedelius
- 1960: On a Bench in a Park - Stig Brender

== Bibliography ==
- Hur ska det gå med mej?, Hasse Ekman, Stockholm: Hökerberg, 1933.
- Gösta Ekman, Hasse Ekman, Stockholm: Bonnier, 1938.
- Den vackra ankungen, Hasse Ekman, Stockholm: Wahlström & Widstrand, 1955.
- Kurre Korint och drömfabriken: en djupt osannfärdig berättelse från filmens underbara värld, Hasse Ekman, Stockholm: Wahlström & Widstrand, 1956.
