= Eva Henning =

Swedish actress (1920–2016)

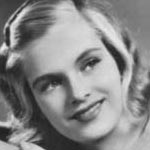
- Henning circa 1940s
- Born: Eva Wetlesen; 10 May 1920; Newark, New York, US
- Died: 18 April 2016 (aged 95); Oslo, Norway
- Other name: Eva Maurstad
- Education: Royal Dramatic Theatre
- Occupation: Actress
- Years active: 1940–1972
- Spouses: Jochum Beck-Friis; (m. 1943; div. 1946) Hasse Ekman (m. 1946; div. 1953): Toralv Maurstad; (m. 1954; div. 1970)
- Children: Fam Ekman; Peder Maurstad; Momse Maurstad
- Parent(s): Edgar Wetlesen (father); Ragni Frisell (mother)
- Relatives: Uno Henning (step-father)

Eva Henning (born Eva Wetlesen; 10 May 1920 – 18 April 2016) was a Swedish stage and movie actress.

== Career ==
Born in Newark, New York, US, Henning was trained at the Royal Dramatic Theatre's acting school (1938–40) in Sweden and made her film debut the same year in Ragnar Arvedson's Gentleman att hyra. The big breakthrough came in Åke Ohberg's Elvira Madigan (1943). She is most famous for her leading roles in many of husband Hasse Ekman's films in the 1940s and 50s.

== Family and personal life ==
Eva Wetlesen was born to Edgar Wetlesen and Ragni Wetlesen (née Frisell; later Henning). Henning is a step-daughter to the Swedish stage actor Uno Henning. She was married three times: from 1943 to 1946 to Jochum Beck-Friis, from 1946 to 1953 to Swedish actor Hasse Ekman and from 1954 to 1970 to Norwegian actor Toralv Maurstad. She had one daughter from her second husband: children's author and illustrator Fam Ekman. She had two sons from her third husband: Peder Maurstad and Momse Maurstad (who died at six months). Henning died on 18 April 2016 in Oslo, Norway.

== Selected filmography ==
- Gentleman att hyra (1940)
- Bright Prospects (1941)
- Scanian Guerilla (1941)
- We're All Errand Boys (1941)
- Only a Woman (1941)
- Söderpojkar (1941)
- General von Döbeln (1942)
- It Is My Music (1942)
- Elvira Madigan (1943)
- The Rose of Tistelön (1945)
- Wandering with the Moon (1945)
- Kungliga patrasket (1945)
- One Swallow Does Not Make a Summer (1947)
- Banketten (1948)
- The Girl from the Third Row (1949)
- Prison (1949)
- Thirst (1949)
- Girl with Hyacinths (1950)
- The White Cat (1950)
- The Firebird (1952)
- Hidden in the Fog (1953)
- The Glass Mountain (1953)
- Gabrielle (1954)
- Om Tilla (1963)
- Svarta palmkronor (1968)
- Ture Sventon privatdetektiv (1972)
