= Agda Helin =

Swedish actress (1894–1984)

- Helin circa 1910
- Born: Agda Kristina Helin; 27 October 1894; Bjärka-Säby, Sweden
- Died: 10 February 1984 (aged 89); Södermalm, Sweden
- Occupation: Actress
- Years active: 1912–1968

Agda Helin (27 October 1894 – 10 February 1984) was a Swedish actress. She appeared in more than 60 films between 1912 and 1968.

== Selected filmography ==
- House Slaves (1923)
- South of the Highway (1936)
- The Three of Us (1940)
- Lasse-Maja (1941)
- Life Goes On (1941)
- Only a Woman (1941)
- The Talk of the Town (1941)
- Adventurer (1942)
- The Sixth Shot (1943)
- She Thought It Was Him (1943)
- Change of Train (1943)
- Imprisoned Women (1943)
- There's a Fire Burning (1943)
- Motherhood (1945)
- The Journey Away (1945)
- The Österman Brothers' Virago (1945)
- Incorrigible (1946)
- Crime in the Sun (1947)
- Knockout at the Breakfast Club (1950)
- My Name Is Puck (1951)
- Speed Fever (1953)
- Whoops! (1955)
- A Goat in the Garden (1958)
- Ön (1966)
- Shame (1968)
