= The Beat of Wings in the Night =

1953 film

- Directed by: Kenne Fant
- Written by: Sven Edvin Salje (novel); Karl Fredrik Björn
- Produced by: Lennart Landheim; Gunnar Lundin
- Starring: Edvin Adolphson; Erik Berglund; Naima Wifstrand
- Cinematography: Kalle Bergholm
- Edited by: Lennart Arvidsson
- Music by: Erland von Koch
- Production company: Nordisk Tonefilm
- Distributed by: Nordisk Tonefilm
- Release date: 5 October 1953
- Running time: 98 minutes
- Country: Sweden
- Language: Swedish

The Beat of Wings in the Night (Swedish: Vingslag i natten) is a 1953 Swedish drama film directed by Kenne Fant and starring Edvin Adolphson, Erik Berglund and Naima Wifstrand. It was a major commercial success, along with One Summer of Happiness, boosting the fortunes of the production company Nordisk Tonefilm. The film's sets were designed by the art director Bibi Lindström.

== Cast ==
- Edvin Adolphson as Tornelius, vicar
- Erik Berglund as Berno
- Naima Wifstrand as Ane
- Dagny Lind as Mrs. Tornelius
- Ruth Kasdan as Valborg
- Carl Ström as Kristen
- Nils Hallberg as Elmer Rönne
- Ulla-Bella Fridh as Hillevi
- Berit Gustafsson as Märta
- Renée Björling as Else Rönne
- Märta Dorff as Head Nurse
- Rut Kronström as Teacher
- Kenne Fant as Ivar Tornelius
- Jan Olov Andersson as Gerald as child
- Lars Ekborg as Gerald Rönne
- Pia Skoglund as Ninni Tornelius
- Kristina Adolphson as Ninni's friend
- Bibi Andersson as Student at Tornelius' party
- Magnus Kesster as Police constable
- Sven Magnusson as Police constable
- Olof Thunberg as Young man
- Öllegård Wellton as Young man's girlfriend

== Bibliography ==
- Qvist, Per Olov & von Bagh, Peter. Guide to the Cinema of Sweden and Finland. Greenwood Publishing Group, 2000.
- Sundholm, John. Historical Dictionary of Scandinavian Cinema. Scarecrow Press, 2012.
