= Erik Hell =

Swedish actor (1911–1973)

- Born: 11 August 1911; Kalliokoski, Finland
- Died: 11 March 1973 (aged 61); Solna, Sweden
- Occupation: Actor
- Years active: 1942–1971
- Spouse: Öllegård Wellton

Erik Hell (11 August 1911 – 11 March 1973) was a Swedish actor. Hell was born in Kalliokoski, Finland, to a Norwegian father and a Finnish mother. He moved to Sweden with his family in 1918 during the Finnish Civil War. He married the actress Öllegård Wellton in 1960. They were married until his death. He was the father of the actor Krister Hell. Erik Hell is buried in the memorial garden at Solna Cemetery.

== Selected filmography ==
- Blossom Time (1940) - Miner (uncredited)
- Snapphanar (1941) - Swedish soldier (uncredited)
- The Yellow Clinic (1942) - First Mate (uncredited)
- Ride Tonight! (1942) - Hans of Lenhovda
- The Heavenly Play (1942) - Jon Persson
- There's a Fire Burning (1943) - Jodl (uncredited)
- Kungajakt (1944) - Möllersten
- The Old Clock at Ronneberga (1944) - Lieutenant Gerhard Grijp
- Live Dangerously (1944) - Parachuting Saboteur
- The Invisible Wall (1944) - Walter Corell
- Oss tjuvar emellan eller En burk ananas (1945) - Nisse, sailor (uncredited)
- Money (1946) - Fireman (uncredited)
- The Balloon (1946) - The Lover
- When the Meadows Blossom (1946) - Stenström
- Barbacka (1946) - Johan
- The Loveliest Thing on Earth (1947) - Bengt Kahlman
- A Ship to India (1947) - Pekka
- Det kom en gäst... (1947) - Edvin
- On These Shoulders (1948) - Aron Loväng
- Port of Call (1948) - Berit's Father
- Realm of Man (1949) - Aron Loväng
- Stora Hoparegränd och himmelriket (1949) - Erik Andersson
- Kranes konditori (1951) - Stivhatten
- One Summer of Happiness (1951) - Torsten, Farm Worker
- Sköna Helena (1951) - Slave Driver
- U-Boat 39 (1952) - First Mate
- The Clang of the Pick (1952) - Johan
- For the Sake of My Intemperate Youth (1952) - Blind Musician
- Barabbas (1953) - Man at Jerusalem (uncredited)
- Bread of Love (1953) - Bouncer
- The Chieftain of Göinge (1953) - Red Nils
- Enchanted Walk (1954) - Strong Man
- Storm Over Tjurö (1954) - Vicar
- Salka Valka (1954) - Customs Inspector
- La Sorcière (1956) - Pullinen
- A Dreamer's Journey (1957) - Erik Axel Blom
- Rider in Blue (1959) - Kurt Forsberg
- Lovely Is the Summer Night (1961) - Egon Ström
- Pärlemor (1961) - Hilmer Persson
- Adventures of Nils Holgersson (1962) - The Hunter
- Det är hos mig han har varit (1963) - Drunken Man
- 491 (1964) - Policeman
- Dear John (1964) - Yngve Lindgren
- Morianna (1965) - Ragnar Synnéus
- I, a Woman (1965) - Siv's Father
- Ön (1966) - Pettersson
- Mördaren - en helt vanlig person (1967) - Tryggve Holm
- Tofflan (1967) - Uno
- The Vicious Circle (1967) - The Father
- Vindingevals (1968) - Oskar Kron
- Carmilla (1968) - Gunnar Wahlström
- Komedi i Hägerskog (1968) - Väg-Larsen
- The Rite (1969, TV Movie) - Judge Dr. Abrahamson
- The Passion of Anna (1969) - Johan Andersson
- Ann and Eve (1970) - Col. Braun
