= The Lady in Black (1958 film) =

1958 film

- Directed by: Arne Mattsson
- Screenplay by: Folke Mellvig; Lars Widding
- Produced by: Rune Waldekranz
- Starring: Karl-Arne Holmsten; Annalisa Ericson; Anita Björk
- Cinematography: Sven Nykvist
- Edited by: Lennart Wallén
- Music by: Torbjörn Lundquist
- Production company: Sandrews
- Distributed by: Sandrews
- Release date: 1 February 1958
- Running time: 109 minutes
- Country: Sweden
- Language: Swedish

The Lady in Black (Swedish: Damen i svart) is a 1958 Swedish mystery thriller film directed by Arne Mattsson. It was shot at the Centrumateljéerna Studios in Stockholm with sets designed by the art director Bibi Lindström. The film is the first film in director Arne Mattsson's Hillman-series of five thriller films, all containing a colour in the title: The Lady in Black (1958), Mannequin in Red (1958), Rider in Blue (1959), The Lady in White (1962), and The Yellow Car (1963).

== Plot summary ==
Private detectives John and Kajsa Hillman are visiting friends on Holmfors mill when several people disappear mysteriously. A young lady disappears one night at the mill. She was seen going off to post a letter, and then just vanishes. That same night, the "family ghost" The Lady in Black was visible, a bad omen. Many people at the mill and its surroundings have their motives and many have also behaved mysteriously.

== Cast ==
- Karl-Arne Holmsten as John Hillman, private detective
- Annalisa Ericson as Kajsa Hillman, his wife
- Nils Hallberg as Freddy Sjöström, Hillmans assistant
- Anita Björk as Inger von Schilden
- Sven Lindberg as Christian von Schilden, her husband
- Isa Quensel as Cecilia von Schilden, his sister
- Lena Granhagen as Sonja Svensson, a model
- Sif Ruud as Aina Engström, a sculptor
- Lennart Lindberg as Björn Sandgren
- Torsten Winge as Hansson, the mysterious man
- Åke Lindman as David Frohm
- Sonja Westerbergh as Maja
- Ingrid Borthen as Dagmar Frohm
- Kotti Chave as Sune Öhrgren
- Catherine Berg as Ann-Marie Hansson
- John Norrman as Andersson
- Margareta Bergman as Nanna
- John Melin as Bus Driver
- Curt Löwgren as Erik
- Per-Axel Arosenius as Johansson, Policeman
- Erik Strandell as Police
- Per-Olof Ekvall as Police

== Bibliography ==
- Qvist, Per Olov & von Bagh, Peter. Guide to the Cinema of Sweden and Finland. Greenwood Publishing Group, 2000.
