= John Norrman =

Swedish actor

- Born: 19 July 1884; Kristianstad, Sweden
- Died: 11 November 1966 (aged 82); Stockholm, Sweden
- Occupation: Actor
- Years active: 1907–1964

John Anders Norrman (19 July 1884 – 11 November 1966), was a Swedish actor. Norrman appeared in over 70 roles in films between 1921 and 1964.

== Selected filmography ==
- Norrtullsligan (1923)
- The Marriage Game (1935)
- Shipwrecked Max (1936)
- Mother Gets Married (1937)
- Storm Over the Skerries (1938)
- Life Begins Today (1939)
- With Open Arms (1940)
- Goransson's Boy (1941)
- The Talk of the Town (1941)
- Life in the Country (1943)
- She Thought It Was Him (1943)
- Blizzard (1944)
- Turn of the Century (1944)
- Brita in the Merchant's House (1946)
- The Bells of the Old Town (1946)
- Neglected by His Wife (1947)
- Private Karlsson on Leave (1947)
- The People of Simlang Valley (1947)
- Lars Hård (1948)
- On These Shoulders (1948)
- Perhaps a Gentleman (1950)
- Miss Julie (1951)
- A Ghost on Holiday (1951)
- For the Sake of My Intemperate Youth (1952)
- The Clang of the Pick (1952)
- Salka Valka (1954)
- Storm Over Tjurö (1954)
- Young Summer (1954)
- Enchanted Walk (1954)
- Men in the Dark (1955)
- The Light from Lund (1955)
- The People of Hemsö (1955)
- Tarps Elin (1956)
- The Girl in Tails (1956)
- The Minister of Uddarbo (1957)
- A Dreamer's Journey (1957)
- Bill Bergson Lives Dangerously (1957)
- The Great Amateur (1958)
- Playing on the Rainbow (1958)
- The Lady in Black (1958)
- A Goat in the Garden (1958)
- Mannequin in Red (1958)
- A Lion in Town (1959)
- Åsa-Nisse as a Policeman (1960)
- On a Bench in a Park (1960)
- Lovely Is the Summer Night (1961)
- Adventures of Nils Holgersson (1962)
- Sten Stensson Returns (1963)
- Swedish Portraits (1964)
