= Bibi Lindström =

Swedish art director

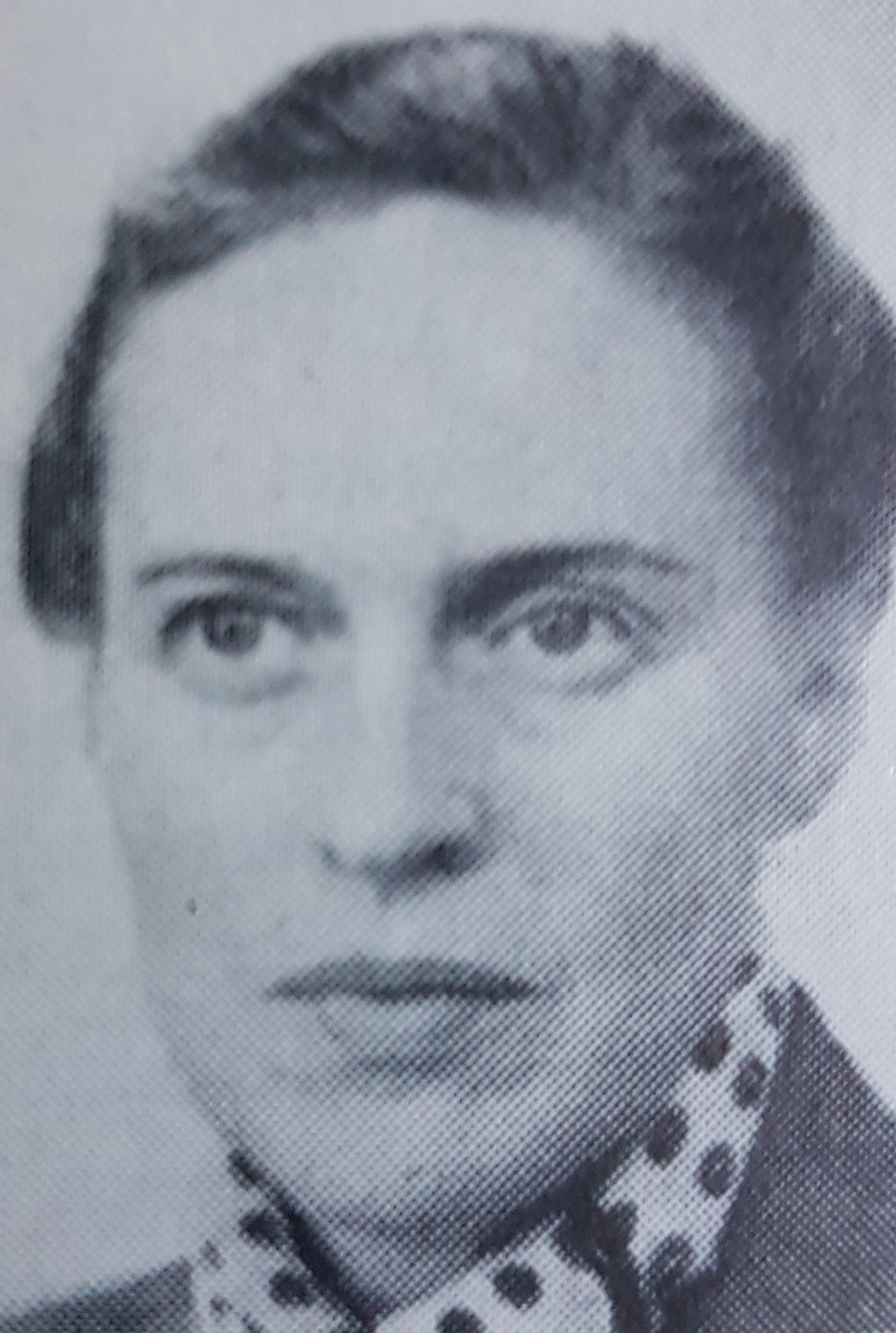
- Born: 30 June 1904; Arbrå, Sweden
- Died: 4 November 1984 (aged 80); Stockholm, Sweden
- Occupation: Art director
- Years active: 1932–1973 (film)

Bibi Lindström (30 June 1904 – 4 November 1984) was a Swedish art director. She designed the sets for more than a hundred film productions.

== Selected filmography ==
- Jolly Musicians (1932)
- The Dangerous Game (1933)
- Saturday Nights (1933)
- The Women Around Larsson (1934)
- Shipwrecked Max (1936)
- The Quartet That Split Up (1936)
- Raggen (1936)
- Our Boy (1936)
- Sun Over Sweden (1938)
- Hanna in Society (1940)
- Her Melody (1940)
- The Poor Millionaire (1941)
- Woman on Board (1941)
- We House Slaves (1942)
- Men of the Navy (1943)
- Imprisoned Women (1943)
- I Killed (1943)
- Life and Death (1943)
- Prince Gustaf (1944)
- I Am Fire and Air (1944)
- The Rose of Tistelön (1945)
- Interlude (1946)
- Maria (1947)
- Neglected by His Wife (1947)
- The Poetry of Ådalen (1947)
- The People of Simlang Valley (1947)
- On These Shoulders (1948)
- Carnival Evening (1948)
- Realm of Man (1949)
- The Girl from the Third Row (1949)
- Jack of Hearts (1950)
- The White Cat (1950)
- Teacher's First Born (1950)
- Knockout at the Breakfast Club (1950)
- Andersson's Kalle (1950)
- Miss Julie (1951)
- My Name Is Puck (1951)
- One Summer of Happiness (1951)
- The Clang of the Pick (1952)
- The Green Lift (1952)
- Unmarried Mothers (1953)
- Ursula, the Girl from the Finnish Forests (1953)
- The Shadow (1953)
- The Road to Klockrike (1953)
- The Beat of Wings in the Night (1953)
- Salka Valka (1954)
- Enchanted Walk (1954)
- Young Summer (1954)
- The People of Hemsö (1955)
- Men in the Dark (1955)
- The Summer Wind Blows (1955)
- The Dance Hall (1955)
- A Little Nest (1956)
- The Minister of Uddarbo (1957)
- No Tomorrow (1957)
- Mannequin in Red (1958)
- Fridolf Stands Up! (1958)
- We at Väddö (1958)
- The Lady in Black (1958)
- Rider in Blue (1959)
- The Beloved Game (1959)
- The Wedding Day (1960)
- Summer and Sinners (1960)
- Good Friends and Faithful Neighbours (1960)
- Siska (1962)
- The Dress (1964)

== Bibliography ==
- Vermilye, Jerry. Ingmar Bergman: His Life and Films. McFarland, 2002.
