= Curt Löwgren =

Swedish actor

- Born: 20 December 1908
- Died: 15 March 1967 (aged 58)
- Occupation: Actor
- Years active: 1943–1966

Curt Löwgren (20 December 1908 – 15 March 1967) was a Swedish film actor. He appeared in 45 films between 1943 and 1966.

== Selected filmography ==
- In Darkest Smaland (1943) - Conscript (uncredited)
- Se opp för spioner! (1944) - Doorkeeper
- I Roslagens famn (1945) - School Teacher (uncredited)
- Jagad (1945) - Kurre (uncredited)
- Försök inte med mej..! (1946) - Old Man (uncredited)
- Möte i natten (1946) - Rosell, aka 'Hertigen' (uncredited)
- Hotell Kåkbrinken (1946) - Alex Hermansson
- Poker (1951) - Taxi driver (uncredited)
- Divorced (1951) - Accordion Player (uncredited)
- Kungen av Dalarna (1953) - Editor of Stockolm's magazin (uncredited)
- Dance, My Doll (1953) - Hairdresser (uncredited)
- Sawdust and Tinsel (1953) - Blom
- Men in the Dark (1955) - Village Idiot
- Whoops! (1955) - Fritiof Andersson
- Getting Married (1955) - Groom (uncredited)
- The Unicorn (1955) - Waiter at the Operabaren (uncredited)
- Bröderna Östermans bravader (1955) - Elof Elofsson
- Så tuktas kärleken (1955) - Clerk in Clothes Store
- The People of Hemsö (1955) - Norman
- A Little Nest (1956) - His friend
- Seventh Heaven (1956) - Frisör (uncredited)
- The Girl in Tails (1956) - Karlsson
- Lille Fridolf och jag (1956) - Uncle Knut
- Johan på Snippen (1956) - Gusten
- When the Mills are Running (1956) - Policeman Pettersson
- Encounters in the Twilight (1957) - Disturbed Neighbor (uncredited)
- Johan på Snippen tar hem spelet (1957) - Gusten
- The Lady in Black (1958) - Erik
- You Are My Adventure (1958) - Farmer (uncredited)
- The Great Amateur (1958) - Messenger from the Mayor (uncredited)
- Woman in a Fur Coat (1958) - Porter (uncredited)
- The Phantom Carriage (1958) - Blind Man (uncredited)
- Åsa-Nisse in Military Uniform (1958) - Postman (uncredited)
- Musik ombord (1958) - Stadsbud
- Miss April (1958) - Policeman (uncredited)
- Mannequin in Red (1958) - Guard
- Swinging at the Castle (1959) - Mr. Kaskegård (uncredited)
- Får jag låna din fru? (1959) - Bartender (uncredited)
- Åsa-Nisse jubilerar (1959) - Knohultarn
- Rider in Blue (1959) - Parat
- A Lion in Town (1959) - Roffe
- Heart's Desire (1960) - Mechanic
- Åsa-Nisse as a Policeman (1960) - Andersson, police clerk (uncredited)
- Lovely Is the Summer Night (1961) - Matsäcken
- The Lady in White (1962) - Taxichaufför (uncredited)
- En nolla för mycket (1962) - Fruit trades man (uncredited)
- Den gula bilen (1963) - Old Man at Klerbo Train Station (uncredited)
- Åsa-Nisse och tjocka släkten (1963) - Fishing competition manager (uncredited)
- Tre dar i buren (1963) - Långfingret
- Åsa-Nisse slår till (1965) - Sjökvist
- Adamsson i Sverige (1966) - Erlandsson
