= Spring of Life (1957 film) =

1957 film

- Directed by: Arne Mattsson
- Written by: Ariel Cortazzo; Per Olof Ekström
- Produced by: Ángel Zavalia
- Starring: Nicole Berger; Folke Sundquist; Pedro Laxalt
- Cinematography: Américo Hoss
- Edited by: José Serra
- Music by: Alberto Ginastera
- Production companies: Guaranteed Pictures de la Argentina; Nordisk Tonefilm
- Distributed by: Nordisk Tonefilm
- Release date: 30 September 1957
- Running time: 83 minutes
- Countries: Argentina; Sweden
- Language: Swedish

Spring of Life (Spanish: Primavera de la vida, Swedish: Livets vår) is 1957 Argentine-Swedish drama film directed by Arne Mattsson and starring Nicole Berger, Folke Sundquist and Pedro Laxalt. It was shot in studios in Buenos Aires and on location in the region. The film's sets were designed by the art director Gori Muñoz. The film tried to exploit the success of Mattson's earlier film One Summer of Happiness which had also starred Sundquist.

== Synopsis ==
Young couple Elisa Fernandez and Marcelo are in love, but she is distressed that he is going away to Buenos Aires to study. Her strict father opposes their relationship, but Marcelo tries to find a way in order to raise the money so that she can come to the city with him.

== Cast ==
- Nicole Berger as Elisa Fernandez
- Folke Sundquist as Marcelo
- Pedro Laxalt as Mr. Fernandez
- Elisardo Santalla as Don Manuelo
- Norma Giménez as Rosita
- Marisa Núñez as Mercedes
- Horacio Priani as Lopez
- Alita Román as Doña Elena

== Bibliography ==
- Cowie, Peter Françoise Buquet, Risto Pitkänen & Godfried Talboom. Scandinavian Cinema: A Survey of the Films and Film-makers of Denmark, Finland, Iceland, Norway, and Sweden. Tantivy Press, 1992.
- Soila, Tytti. The Cinema of Scandinavia. Wallflower Press, 2005.
