= Enchanted Walk =

1954 film

- Directed by: Arne Mattsson
- Written by: Rune Lindström
- Based on: Die Verzauberten by Roland Betsch
- Produced by: Lennart Landheim
- Starring: Folke Sundquist; Elsa Prawitz; Edvin Adolphson
- Cinematography: Hilding Bladh; Sven Thermænius
- Edited by: Lennart Wallén
- Music by: Sven Sköld
- Production company: Nordisk Tonefilm
- Distributed by: Nordisk Tonefilm
- Release date: 19 April 1954
- Running time: 105 minutes
- Country: Sweden
- Language: Swedish

Enchanted Walk (Swedish: Förtrollad vandring) is a 1954 Swedish drama film directed by Arne Mattsson and starring Folke Sundquist, Elsa Prawitz and Edvin Adolphson. The film's sets were designed by the art director Bibi Lindström.

== Synopsis ==
A travelling theatre company arrives in a small town. However the director then flees with the company's funds.

== Cast ==
- Folke Sundquist as Henrik Ulfsax
- Elsa Prawitz as Louise von Bogenhusen
- Edvin Adolphson as Johan Kasimir Enquist
- Hjördis Petterson as Mrs. Emilie Hassel
- Erik Hell as Strong Man
- Nils Hallberg as Mr. Bummel
- Magnus Kesster as Magnus von Bogenhusen
- Sonja Stjernquist as Lena
- Carl-Gustaf Lindstedt as Mefistofeles
- Georg Skarstedt as Thin Man
- John Melin as Theatre Manager
- Julia Cæsar as Emma, cook
- Sven Magnusson as Singer
- Lissi Alandh as Waitress
- Ernst Brunman as Irate Theatre Visitor
- Ulla-Bella Fridh as Actress
- Ingemar Holde as Stage manager
- John Norrman as Circus Manager
- Stig Johanson as Counterfeiter
- Birger Åsander as Counterfeiter

== Bibliography ==
- Cowie, Peter Françoise Buquet, Risto Pitkänen & Godfried Talboom. Scandinavian Cinema: A Survey of the Films and Film-makers of Denmark, Finland, Iceland, Norway, and Sweden. Tantivy Press, 1992.
