= Ulla Jacobsson =

Swedish actress (1929–1982)

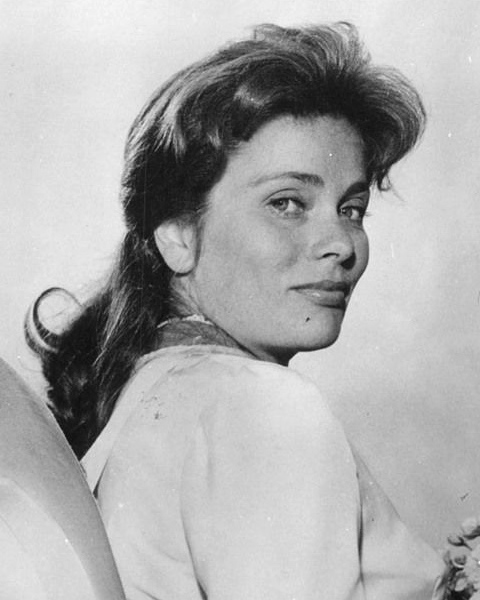
- Jacobsson in 1963
- Born: 23 May 1929; Mölndal, Sweden
- Died: 20 August 1982 (aged 53); Vienna, Austria
- Education: Gothenburg Acting City Theatre School
- Occupation: Actress
- Years active: 1951–1978
- Notable work: One Summer of Happiness; Zulu
- Spouse(s): Josef Kornfeld (m. 19??; div. 19??); Frank Lodeizen (m. 19??; div. 19??) Hans Winfried Rohsmann (m. 1960)
- Children: 2

Ulla Jacobsson (23 May 1929 – 20 August 1982) was a Swedish actress. She had the lead role in One Summer of Happiness (1951) and played the only female speaking role in the film Zulu (1964).

== Early life ==
Jacobsson was born in Mölndal, Gothenburg and Bohus County, Sweden, on May 23, 1929.

== Career ==
Jacobsson was one of 48 candidates chosen to attend Gothenburg Acting City Theatre School. She began acting in this theatre in 1952. She began her professional career in her native Gothenburg and appeared in classical and modern theater roles before turning to film. Jacobsson's first acting role was of the Bride Nissa in the drama The Sea in Fire (1951); although, she may be best known for her role in Zulu (1964) where she played the only female speaking role.

Beginning in the late 1950s, Jacobsson stopped acting in Swedish films, and appeared in films from the United States, France, Spain, Germany, and the United Kingdom. Jacobsson made her American debut in The Grand Duke and Mr. Pimm. According to Metropolitan Life, Jacobsson believed she could be successful in both acting and marriage. She only took two acting jobs a year to travel with her husband. She explained, "When a very good part comes, there is temptation to take it, but I refuse. I love success. I love to make myself something. But I love more my husband and children."

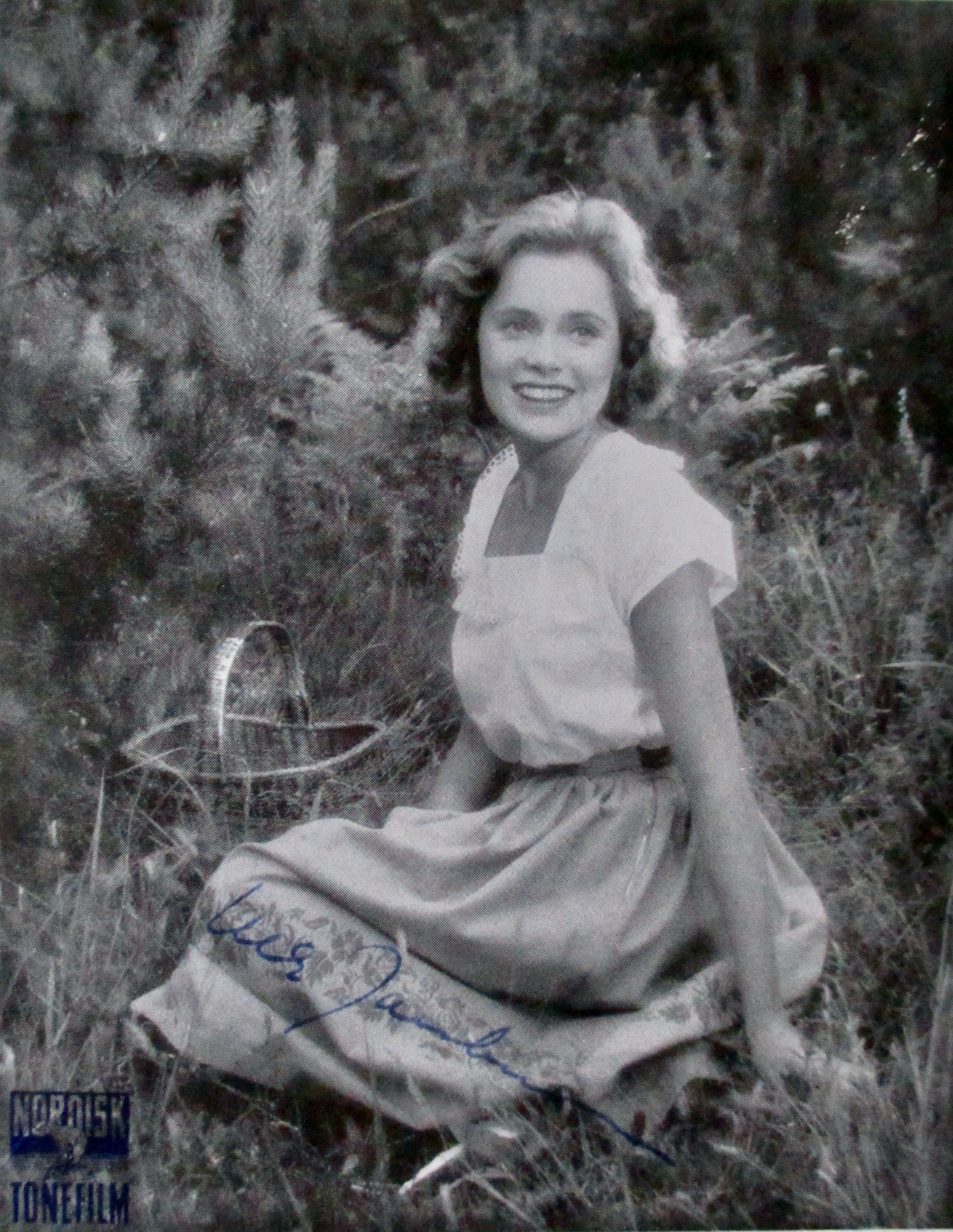
Ulla Jacobsson in 1950s

Jacobsson became internationally famous for her nude scenes in One Summer of Happiness (1951). This, along with her role in the American film Love Is a Ball (1963), was an attempt to make her a sex symbol. This was common among female actresses in the 1960s. One Summer of Happiness won the top prize at Berlin International Film Festival ('Berlinale') in 1952. Bosley Crowther of The New York Times describes the film, "Ulla Jacobsson as the farm girl is a sensitive and expressive young thing who stunningly portrays the caprices and the terrors of an innocent maid in love."

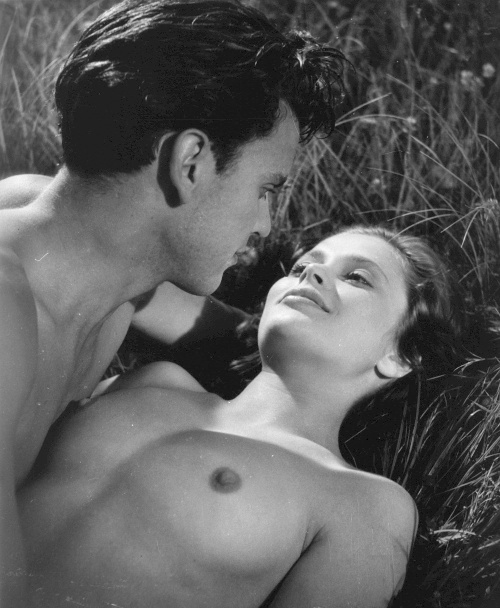
Jacobsson with Folke Sundquist in Hon dansade en sommar (1951)

In 1963, she appeared in the first-season episode, "The Final Hour", of the US TV show The Virginian, in the role of Policia. Her popularity among mass audiences gained her the role of Margaretta Witt in the adventure film Zulu (1964). Other notable roles include Ingmar Bergman's Smiles of a Summer Night (1955), The Heroes of Telemark (1965) and La Servante (1970). A notable award was the German Film Award for Supporting Actress in Alle Jahre wieder (1967). She made appearances in film and television shows until 1979.

== Personal life ==
Jacobsson's first husband was a Viennese engineer named Josef Kornfeld. The marriage brought her Austrian citizenship. They also had a daughter named Ditte. During the 1950s, Jacobsson married her second husband, Dutch painter Frank Lodeizen (1931–2013), with whom she had a son named Martin. In 1960 she married her third husband, Austrian doctor Hans Winfried Rohsmann (1918–2002), and moved to Vienna, Austria.

== Death ==
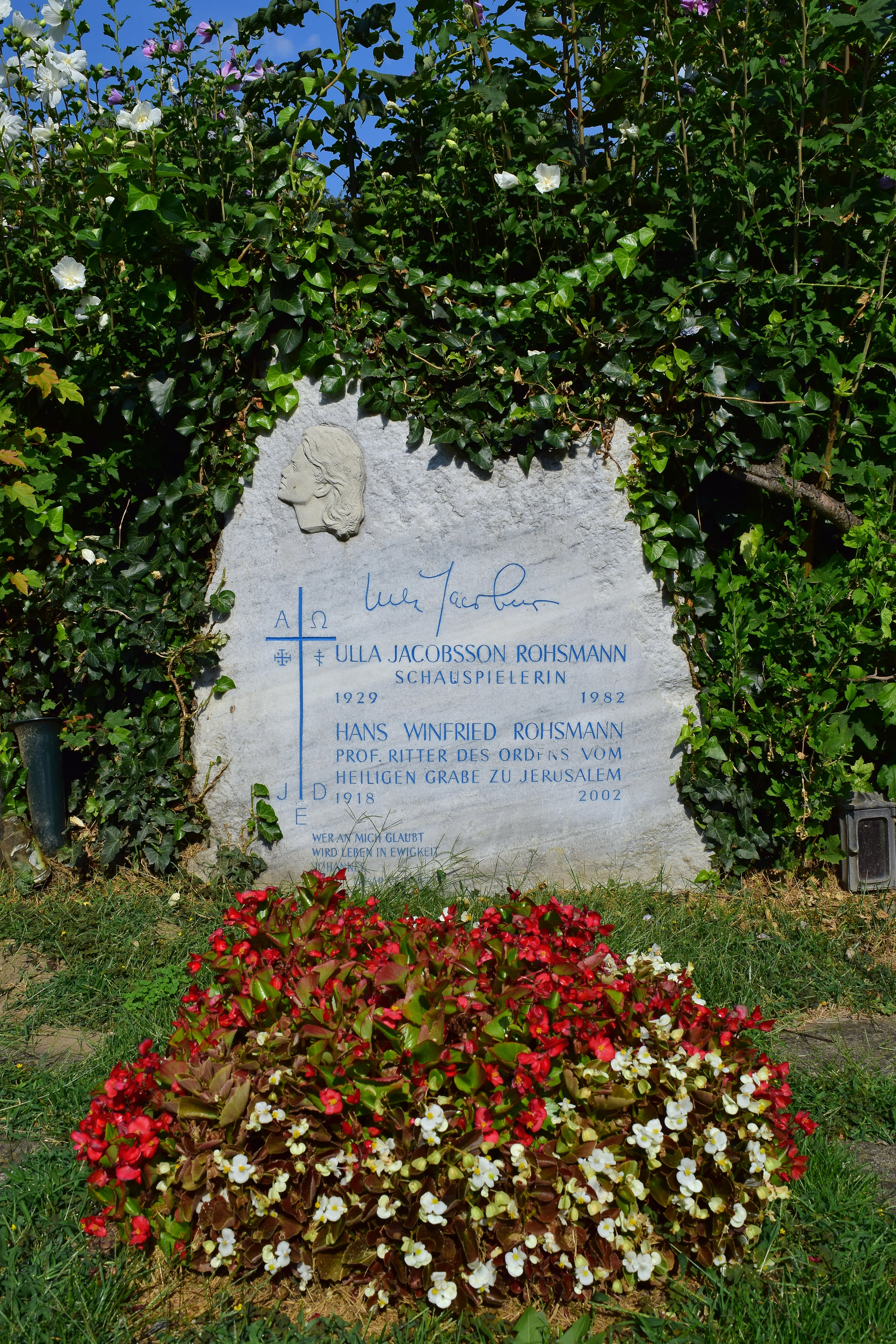
Ulla Jacobsson Rohsmann's grave site in Wiener Zentralfriedhof

Jacobsson died in Vienna, Austria, from bone cancer on August 20, 1982. She was 53 years old. She was buried at the Wiener Zentralfriedhof.

== Legacy ==
In 2015, a town square in Mölndal was named after Jacobsson.

== Filmography ==
Year	Title	Role	Notes
1951	In the Arms of the Sea	Nisse's Fiancée	
1952	One Summer of Happiness	Kerstin	Won the top prize at the Berlin International Film Festival
1953	All the World's Delights	Lisbet Enarsdotter	
1954	Sacred Lie	Lena Larsen	
1954	Love is Forever	Marieke	
1954	Karin Månsdotter	Karin Månsdotter	
1954	Herr Arnes penningar	Elsalill	
1955	The Priest from Kirchfeld	Anna Birkmaier	
1955	Smiles of a Summer Night	Anne Egerman	
1956	Crime and Punishment	Nicole Brunel	
1956	The Song of the Scarlet Flower	Elli	
1957	The Last Ones Shall Be First	Wanda	
1958	The Phantom Carriage	Edit	
1958	Restless Night	Melanie	
1959	Llegaron dos hombres	Laura, Maestra	
1959	And That on Monday Morning	Delia Mond	
1960	Im Namen einer Mutter	Vicky Merlin	
1961	Riviera Story	Anja Dahlberg	
1962	Una domenica d'estate		
1963	Love Is a Ball	Janine	
1964	Zulu	Margareta Witt	
1965	The Heroes of Telemark	Anna	
1965	Nightmare	Maj Berg	
1967	Next Year, Same Time	Lore Lücke	Jacobsson won a German Film Award for Supporting Actress
1968	Adolphe ou l'Âge tendre	Hélène / Ellénore	
1968	Bamse	Vera Berg	
1970	La servante	Ulla Marbois	
1974	One or the Other of Us	Mrs. Kolczyk	
1975	Fox and His Friends	Eugen's mother	
1979	Das Ding	Rocky's mother	TV film
