= Men in the Dark =

1955 film

- Directed by: Arne Mattsson
- Written by: Rune Lindström
- Based on: Nattens väv by Owe Husáhr
- Starring: Elof Ahrle; Sigge Fürst; Sven Lindberg
- Cinematography: Max Wilén
- Edited by: Lennart Wallén
- Music by: Sven Sköld
- Production company: Nordisk Tonefilm
- Distributed by: Nordisk Tonefilm
- Release date: 6 February 1955
- Running time: 96 minutes
- Country: Sweden
- Language: Swedish

Men in the Dark (Swedish: Männen i mörker) is a 1955 Swedish drama film directed by Arne Mattsson and starring Elof Ahrle, Sigge Fürst and Sven Lindberg. It was shot at the Kungsholmen Studios of Nordisk Tonefilm in Stockholm and on location in Dannemora. The film's sets were designed by the art director Bibi Lindström.

== Cast ==
- Elof Ahrle as Helge Vilde
- Sigge Fürst as Bertil Lund
- Sven Lindberg as Åke Landberg
- Sven Magnusson as Valter Stjärna
- Nils Hallberg as Stranger
- Victor Sjöström as Gustaf Landberg
- Bengt Eklund as Ragnar Tranberg
- Lennart Lindberg as Lennart Bergman
- Douglas Håge as Kjellander
- John Norrman as Hiss-Lasse
- Curt Löwgren as Village Idiot
- Edvin Adolphson as Herbert Åslund
- Elsa Prawitz as Stina
- Brita Öberg as Anna
- Marianne Bengtsson as Karin
- Britta Brunius as Britta Lund
- Ulla Holmberg as Ingrid

== Bibliography ==
- Qvist, Per Olov & von Bagh, Peter. Guide to the Cinema of Sweden and Finland. Greenwood Publishing Group, 2000.
