= Salka Valka =

1954 film

- Directed by: Arne Mattsson
- Written by: Rune Lindström
- Based on: Salka Valka by Halldór Laxness
- Produced by: Lennart Landheim
- Starring: Gunnel Broström; Folke Sundquist; Margaretha Krook
- Cinematography: Sven Nykvist
- Edited by: Lennart Wallén
- Music by: Sven Sköld
- Production companies: Edda Film; Nordisk Tonefilm
- Distributed by: Nordisk Tonefilm
- Release date: 15 November 1954
- Running time: 132 minutes
- Country: Sweden
- Language: Swedish

Salka Valka is a 1954 Swedish drama film directed by Arne Mattsson and starring Gunnel Broström, Folke Sundquist and Margaretha Krook. It was shot at the Stockholm studios of Nordisk Tonefilm and on location in Iceland. The film's sets were designed by the art director Bibi Lindström. It is based on the novel of the same title by the Icelandic writer Halldór Laxness.

== Cast ==
- Gunnel Broström as Salka Valka
- Folke Sundquist as Arnaldur Björnsson
- Margaretha Krook as Sigurlina Jonsdottir
- Erik Strandmark as Steinthor Steinsson
- Birgitta Pettersson as Young Salka Valka
- Nils Hallberg as Angantyr Bogesen
- Rune Carlsten as Johan Bogesen
- Sigge Fürst as Salvation Army Captain
- Marianne Löfgren as Tordis
- Elsa Prawitz as American Tourist
- John Norrman as Eyjolfur
- Hedvig Lindby as Steinunn
- Lárus Pállsson as Beinten
- Ingemar Holde as Gudmundur Jonsson
- Åke Lindström as Laborer
- Erik Hell as Customs Inspector
- Stig Johanson as Teacher
- John Melin as Katrinus
- Lars 'Lasse' Andersson as Arnaldur as child
- Ann-Marie Adamsson as Guja
- Birger Åsander as Skipper

== Bibliography ==
- Iverson, Gunnar, Widding Soderbergh, Astrid & Soila, Tytti. Nordic National Cinemas. Routledge, 2005. ISBN 9780415081948
