= When Darkness Falls (1960 film) =

1960 film

- Directed by: Arne Mattsson
- Screenplay by: Maria Lang
- Based on: Tragedi på en lantkyrkogård 1954 novel by Maria Lang
- Produced by: Rune Waldekranz
- Starring: Nils Asther; Karl-Arne Holmsten; Birgitta Pettersson; Elsa Prawitz; Adolf Jahr; Mimi Nelson; George Fant
- Cinematography: Hilding Bladh
- Edited by: Lennart Wallén
- Music by: Torbjörn Lundquist
- Production company: Sandrews
- Distributed by: Sandrews
- Release date: 26 December 1960 (Sweden)
- Running time: 113 minutes
- Country: Sweden
- Language: Swedish

When Darkness Falls (Swedish: När mörkret faller) is a 1960 Swedish thriller film directed by Arne Mattsson. The film is based on Maria Langs 1954 novel Tragedi på en lantkyrkogård. The film stars Nils Asther, Karl-Arne Holmsten, Birgitta Pettersson, Elsa Prawitz, Adolf Jahr, Mimi Nelson and George Fant. It was shot at the Centrumateljéerna Studios in Stockholm. The film's sets were designed by the art director Barbro Lindström. It was followed by a sequel Lovely Is the Summer Night in 1961.

== Plot summary ==
The young orphan girl Elisabeth from Stockholm is going to celebrate Christmas with relatives in Västlinge vicarage. When she arrives the day before Christmas the local shopkeeper is meant to pick her up at the station, but because of a misconception, Elisabeth is left to walk alone in the dark, in the deep snow all the way to the house. There she is warmly welcomed by the vicar Tord Ekstedt and his daughter Lotta, but the Christmas stillness ends abruptly when they on Christmas Eve finds out that the shopkeeper has been found brutally murdered in his shop.

== Cast ==
- Nils Asther as Tord Ekstedt
- Karl-Arne Holmsten as Christer Wijk
- Birgitta Pettersson as Elisabeth Rydén
- Elsa Prawitz as Barbara Sandell
- Adolf Jahr as Connie Lundgren
- Mimi Nelson as Hjördis Holm
- George Fant as Arne Sandell
- Sif Ruud as Frideborg Jansson
- Hjördis Petterson as Tekla Motander
- Anna-Maria Giertz as Lotta Ekstedt
- Bengt Brunskog as Mårten Gustavsson
- Eva Sjöström as Susanne Motander, Tekla's daughter
- Sigge Fürst as docent Ahlgren, doctor
- Maritta Marke as Alice Broman, Connie Lundgren's sister
- Sven-Erik Jacobsson as Carl Sixten
