= The People of Hemsö (1955 film) =

1955 film

- Directed by: Arne Mattsson
- Written by: Rune Lindström
- Based on: The People of Hemsö by August Strindberg
- Starring: Erik Strandmark; Hjördis Petterson; Nils Hallberg
- Cinematography: Max Wilén
- Edited by: Lennart Arvidsson
- Music by: Sven Sköld
- Production company: Nordisk Tonefilm
- Distributed by: Nordisk Tonefilm
- Release date: 17 December 1955
- Running time: 112 minutes
- Country: Sweden
- Language: Swedish

The People of Hemsö (Swedish: Hemsöborna) is a 1955 Swedish historical drama film directed by Arne Mattsson and starring Erik Strandmark, Hjördis Petterson and Nils Hallberg. It marked the screen debut of Daliah Lavi, then a child actress. The film's sets were designed by the art director Bibi Lindström. It was based on the 1887 novel The People of Hemsö by August Strindberg, previously adapted into a 1944 film of the same title.

== Cast ==
- Erik Strandmark as Carlsson
- Hjördis Petterson as Madame Flod
- Nils Hallberg as Gusten
- John Norrman as Rundquist
- Curt Löwgren as Norman
- Ulla Sjöblom as Clara, maid
- Birgitta Pettersson as Lotten, maid
- Douglas Håge as Nordström
- Georg Rydeberg as Professor
- Ulla Holmberg as Professor's Wife
- Daliah Lavi as Professor's Daughter
- Margit Carlqvist as Ida, maid
- Stig Johanson as Farm-hand
- John Melin as Rapp
- Birger Åsander as Farm-hand
- Wiktor Andersson as Verger
- Artur Cederborgh as Man on the bridge
- Ivar Wahlgren as Captain

== Bibliography ==
- Cowie, Peter. Swedish Cinema, from Ingeborg Holm to Fanny and Alexander. Swedish Institute, 1985.
