= Arne Mattsson =

Swedish film director (1919–1995)

- Born: 2 December 1919; Uppsala, Sweden
- Died: 28 June 1995 (aged 75)
- Occupations: Director, writer
- Years active: 1941–1989
- Spouse: Elsa Prawitz (m. 1956–1965)

Arne Mattsson (2 December 1919 – 28 June 1995) was a Swedish film director.

== Biography ==
Born in Uppsala, the early films of Mattsson were mostly comedies. His biggest success was Hon dansade en sommar (1951, aka. One Summer of Happiness), which earned him the Golden Bear at the Berlin International Film Festival and a nomination for the Grand Prize at the Cannes Film Festival in 1952. It caused some controversy at the time because it contained nudity.

His 1953 film of Peder Sjögren's second novel, Bread of Love (Kärlekens bröd), based on Sjögren's experiences as a volunteer in the Finnish Continuation War of 1941–44 angered the author, was banned in Finland and incurred the wrath of the Soviets at the Cannes Film Festival. In spite of all this, Sjögren grudgingly admitted that as a study of men under severe pressure it was impressive.

In 1958 he directed Damen i svart, the first in the series of five Hillman-thrillers, centred on Folke Mellvig's crime-solving middle-class city couple Kajsa and John Hillman. The second in the series, Mannekäng i rött (1958), is considered by some to be a precursor of the Italian giallo films, notably Mario Bava's Blood and Black Lace.

The popularity of his mystery movies declined and in the 1970s and 1980s he made mostly low-budget thrillers – some in collaboration with Mats Helge Olsson – which got mostly bad reviews.

== Filmography ==
- I brist på bevis (1943, writer)
- Count Only the Happy Moments (1944, writer and assistant director)
- ... och alla dessa kvinnor (1944)
- I som här inträden (1945)
- Maria of Kvarngarden (1945)
- Incorrigible (1946)
- Peggy on a Spree (1946)
- Pappa sökes (1947)
- A Guest Is Coming (1947, also writer)
- Rail Workers (1947)
- Life at Forsbyholm Manor (1948)
- Woman in White (1949)
- Dangerous Spring (1949, also writer)
- When Love Came to the Village (1950)
- Kyssen på kryssen (1950)
- The Saucepan Journey (1950)
- Hon dansade en sommar (1951, known as One Summer of Happiness)
- In the Arms of the Sea (1951)
- För min heta ungdoms skull (1952)
- The Clang of the Pick (1952)
- Det var dans bort i vägen (1953, short film)
- Kärlekens bröd (1953, known as Bread of Love)
- Salka Valka (1954)
- Storm Over Tjurö (1954)
- Enchanted Walk (1954)
- The People of Hemsö (1955)
- Men in the Dark (1955)
- The Girl in Tails (1956)
- A Little Nest (1956)
- Spring of Life (1957)
- No Tomorrow (1957)
- The Phantom Carriage (1958)
- The Lady in Black (1958)
- Mannequin in Red (1958)
- Rider in Blue (1959)
- Får jag låna din fru? (1959)
- Summer and Sinners (1960)
- When Darkness Falls (1960)
- Lovely Is the Summer Night (1961)
- Vaxdockan (The Doll) (1962)
- Ticket to Paradise (1962)
- The Lady in White (1962)
- Den gula bilen (1963)
- Det är hos mig han har varit (1963)
- Sailors (1964, also writer)
- Brott och straff – men det är svårt (1964, also writer)
- Morianna (1965, also writer)
- Nightmare (1965, also writer)
- Här kommer bärsärkarna (1965)
- Woman of Darkness (1966)
- Mördaren – En helt vanlig person (1967, also writer)
- Förtrollad resa (1966, also writer)
- The Vicious Circle (1967)
- Bamse (1968, also writer)
- Ann and Eve (1970)
- Smutsiga fingrar (1973)
- Mannen i skuggan (1978, also writer)
- Sometime, Somewhere... (1983)
- Mask of Murder (1985)
- The Girl (1987)
- Sleep Well, My Love (1987) (aka Destroying Angel)
- The Mad Bunch (1989, with Mats Helge Olsson)
