= Mellvig =

Mellvig is a surname. Notable people with the surname include:

- Börje Mellvig (1911–1998), Swedish actor and director
- Folke Mellvig (1913–1994), Swedish writer, brother of Börje
