= The Shadow (1953 film) =

1953 film

- Directed by: Kenne Fant
- Written by: Kenne Fant
- Produced by: Lennart Landheim
- Starring: Georg Rydeberg; Eva Dahlbeck; Hugo Björne
- Cinematography: Kalle Bergholm
- Edited by: Lennart Wallén
- Music by: Sven Sköld
- Production company: Nordisk Tonefilm
- Distributed by: Nordisk Tonefilm
- Release date: 25 April 1953
- Running time: 79 minutes
- Country: Sweden
- Language: Swedish

The Shadow (Swedish: Skuggan) is a 1953 Swedish drama film directed by Kenne Fant and starring Georg Rydeberg, Eva Dahlbeck and Hugo Björne. It was shot at the Kungsholmen Studios of Nordisk Tonefilm in Stockholm with location shooting at the Stockholm Public Library. The film's sets were designed by the art director Bibi Lindström.

== Cast ==
- Georg Rydeberg as Erik Vender
- Eva Dahlbeck as Vivianne
- Pia Arnell as Eva
- Björn Bjelfvenstam as Frigge Berggren
- Hugo Björne as Publisher
- Gunnar Sjöberg as Doctor
- Olav Riégo as Librarian
- Gull Natorp as Woman
- Märta Arbin as Nurse Karin
- Olle Hilding as Berggren
- Per Sjöstrand as Press Photographer
- Emmy Albiin as Older Woman with a Signed Book
- Wiktor Andersson as Publishing Company Clerk
- Per-Axel Arosenius as Journalist
- Bertil Crone as Journalist
- Sven Holmberg as Journalist
- Hanny Schedin as Woman at the Library
- Rune Stylander as Journalist
- Chris Wahlström as Library Clerk

== Bibliography ==
- Qvist, Per Olov & von Bagh, Peter. Guide to the Cinema of Sweden and Finland. Greenwood Publishing Group, 2000.
