= Young Summer (film) =

1954 film

- Directed by: Kenne Fant
- Written by: Per Olof Ekström (novel); Volodja Semitjov
- Produced by: Lennart Landheim
- Starring: Edvin Adolphson; Lennart Lindberg; Dagmar Ebbesen
- Cinematography: Kalle Bergholm
- Edited by: Carl-Olov Skeppstedt
- Music by: Sune Waldimir
- Production company: Nordisk Tonefilm
- Distributed by: Nordisk Tonefilm
- Release date: 27 September 1954
- Running time: 92 minutes
- Country: Sweden
- Language: Swedish

Young Summer (Swedish: Ung sommar) is a 1954 Swedish drama film directed by Kenne Fant and starring Edvin Adolphson, Lennart Lindberg and Dagmar Ebbesen. The film's sets were designed by the art director Bibi Lindström.

== Cast ==
- Birgitta Lundin as Marianne
- Edvin Adolphson as Albert Lysvik
- Lennart Lindberg as Helge Lysvik
- Gunnar Olsson as Cantor
- Dagmar Ebbesen as Hedvig Lysvik
- Åke Claesson as Christian Carlström
- Nils Hallberg as Janne
- Marianne Löfgren as Helga's landlady
- John Norrman as Nils
- Gunvor Pontén as Elly Carlström
- Börje Mellvig as Sture Wärn, pianist
- Wiktor Andersson as Janitor
- Bengt Blomgren as Stellan
- Ragnar Arvedson as Older gentleman at Carlström's party
- Elsa Ebbesen as Postmistress
- Helga Brofeldt as Lysvik's neighbour
- Kristina Adolphson as Girl at the debutant's ball
- Harry Ahlin as Mayor
- Lena Bergqvist as Little girl on the bus
- Magnus Kesster as Pianist
- Mona Malm as Girl at the debutant's ball
- Curt Masreliez as King in Helge's story
- Hanny Schedin as Marianne's mother
- Tage Severin as Dancing student
- Sonja Westerbergh as Barbro, singer at the ball
- Catrin Westerlund as Girl at the gas station

== Bibliography ==
- Qvist, Per Olov & von Bagh, Peter. Guide to the Cinema of Sweden and Finland. Greenwood Publishing Group, 2000.
