= Good Friends and Faithful Neighbours (1960 film) =

1960 film

- Directed by: Torgny Anderberg
- Written by: Gösta Gustaf-Janson
- Based on: Good Friends and Faithful Neighbours by Gösta Gustaf-Janson
- Produced by: Gunnar Lundin
- Starring: Edvin Adolphson; Anita Björk; George Fant
- Cinematography: Max Wilén
- Edited by: Carl-Olov Skeppstedt
- Music by: Lennart Fors
- Production company: Nordisk Tonefilm
- Distributed by: Nordisk Tonefilm
- Release date: 16 December 1960
- Running time: 91 minutes
- Country: Sweden
- Language: Swedish

Good Friends and Faithful Neighbours (Swedish: Goda vänner, trogna grannar) is a 1960 Swedish drama film directed by Torgny Anderberg and starring Edvin Adolphson, Anita Björk and George Fant. The film's sets were designed by the art director Bibi Lindström.

== Cast ==
- Edvin Adolphson as Hugo Frejer
- Anita Björk as Mrs. Yvonne Frejer
- George Fant as Robert
- Gunnel Lindblom as Margit
- Sif Ruud as Dottan
- Mimmo Wåhlander as Lena Frejer
- Hans Wahlgren as Tommy
- Kotti Chave as Werner, artist
- Rosemarie Runge as Maid
- Sture Ström as Karl-Erik Rosenskiöld
- Ivar Wahlgren as Man at Bromma airport
- Carl-Gunnar Wingård as Bredow

== Bibliography ==
- Qvist, Per Olov & von Bagh, Peter. Guide to the Cinema of Sweden and Finland. Greenwood Publishing Group, 2000.
