= Holger Löwenadler =

Swedish actor (1904–1977)

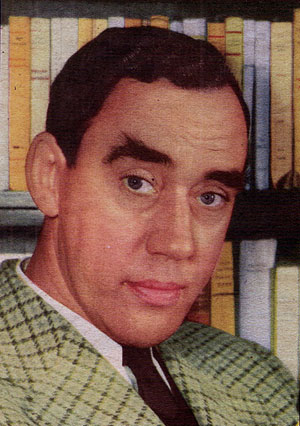
- Born: Holger Carl Minton Löwenadler; 1 April 1904; Jönköping, Sweden
- Died: 18 June 1977 (aged 73); Stockholm, Sweden
- Occupation: Actor
- Years active: 1932–1977

Holger Carl Minton Löwenadler (1 April 1904 – 18 June 1977) was a Swedish film actor. He starred in Ingmar Bergman's A Ship to India (1947). He appeared in Divorced (1951), which was written by Bergman. Other appearances include Lacombe Lucien (1974).

== Selected filmography ==
- International Match (1932) - District Judge
- Love and Dynamite (1933) - Axel
- Karl Fredrik regerar (1934) - Striking man (uncredited)
- Simon of Backabo (1934) - Charley
- The Women Around Larsson (1934) - Detective
- Ocean Breakers (1935) - Doctor (uncredited)
- Skärgårdsflirt (1935) - Vasander
- The Boys of Number Fifty Seven (1935) - Hoodlum's leader (uncredited)
- Poor Millionaires (1936) - Hotel guet wearing pyjama
- The Lady Becomes a Maid (1936) - Johan
- En flicka kommer till sta'n (1937) - Anton B. Carlstrand
- Russian Flu (1937) - Socialdemokratisk talare
- Happy Vestköping (1937) - Krohn (uncredited)
- Du gamla du fria! (1938) - Oskar, sergeant (uncredited)
- They Staked Their Lives (1940) - Miller
- Bastard (1940) - County Sheriff
- Blossom Time (1940) - Lundgren
- Gentlemannagangstern (1941) - Inspector Strömberg
- Landstormens lilla argbigga (1941) - Sven Duvberg
- Jacobs stege (1942) - Herman Franzén
- Ride Tonight! (1942) - 'Budkavle går! Rid i natt! I natt!' (voice, uncredited)
- The Heavenly Play (1942) - King Salomo
- I brist på bevis (1943) - Håkan Dahlin
- Stora skrällen (1943) - C.A. Bonk
- Night in Port (1943)- Mårten
- The Word (1943) - Knut
- Kungajakt (1944) - Carl Gustav von Wismar
- Live Dangerously (1944) - Train Engineer
- The Emperor of Portugallia (1944) - Lars Gunnarsson
- Man's Woman (1945) - Påvel
- The Journey Away (1945) - Hjalmar Andersson
- Johansson and Vestman (1946) - Adolf Johansson
- Iris and the Lieutenant (1946) - Baltzar Motander
- A Ship to India (1947) - Kapten Alexander Blom
- On These Shoulders (1948) - Arvid Loväng
- Woman in White (1949) - Dr. Bo Wallgren
- Jack of Hearts (1950) - Krister Bergencreutz
- Divorced (1951) - Tore Holmgren
- Farlig kurva (1952) - Erik Ljung, Christer's father
- The Girl from Backafall (1953) - August Larsson
- Barabbas (1953) - Thief
- Dance in the Smoke (1954) - Stor-Hugge
- En karl i köket (1954) - Arvid Stenmark
- Uncle's (1955) - August Larsson
- Getting Married (1955) - Docent (uncredited)
- Så tuktas kärleken (1955) - Mr. Hallström
- Egen ingång (1956) - Consul Petreus
- Tarps Elin (1956) - Arvid Loväng
- The Biscuit (1956) - Hugo Braxenhielm
- The Halo Is Slipping (1957) - Broberg
- A Guest in His Own House (1957) - Fredik Lannert
- The Minister of Uddarbo (1957) - Alsing
- Sängkammartjuven (1959) - Kurt Månstedt
- The Judge (1960) - Justice Ombudsman
- Tre önskningar (1960) - Frans Lindberg
- Lovely Is the Summer Night (1961) - Melker Gehlin
- Adventures of Nils Holgersson (1962) - Karl XI (voice)
- Heja Roland! (1966) - Waldemar Vassén
- Here Is Your Life (1966) - Kristiansson
- I Am Curious (Yellow) (1967) - King Gustaf Adolf (uncredited)
- Lockfågeln (1971) - Rosencrantz, the evil vicar
- Chelovek s drugoy storony (1972) - Axberg
- Mannen som slutade röka (1972) - Knut-Birger
- Lacombe Lucien (1974) - Albert Horn
- Monismanien 1995 (1975) - Clerk
- Maîtresse (1976) - Gautier
- Summer Paradise (1977) - Wilhelm
