= Lennart Lindberg =

Swedish actor (1918–2004)

- Born: 24 September 1918; Stockholm, Sweden
- Died: 8 September 2004 (aged 85); Ystad, Sweden
- Occupation: Actor
- Years active: 1951–2001 (film & TV)

Lennart Lindberg (24 September 1918 – 8 September 2004) was a Swedish stage and film actor. He was married to the actress Barbro Larsson in the 1950s.

== Selected filmography ==
- Customs Officer Bom (1951)
- Beef and the Banana (1951)
- U-Boat 39 (1952)
- Blondie, Beef and the Banana (1952)
- Unmarried Mothers (1953)
- Bread of Love (1953)
- Young Summer (1954)
- Men in the Dark (1955)
- The Dance Hall (1955)
- The Girl in Tails (1956)
- The Lady in Black (1958)
- Åsa-Nisse in Military Uniform (1958)
- Rider in Blue (1959)
- A Matter of Morals (1961)
- Sailors (1964)

== Bibliography ==
- Steene, Birgitta. Ingmar Bergman: A Reference Guide. Amsterdam University Press, 2005.
- Wright, Rochelle. The Visible Wall: Jews and Other Ethnic Outsiders in Swedish Film. SIU Press, 1998.
