= Bread of Love =

1953 film

- Directed by: Arne Mattsson
- Written by: Volodja Semitjov; Peder Sjögren
- Starring: Folke Sundquist
- Cinematography: Sven Thermænius
- Edited by: Lennart Wallén
- Release date: 23 October 1953
- Country: Sweden
- Language: Swedish

Bread of Love (Swedish: Kärlekens bröd) is a 1953 Swedish drama film directed by Arne Mattsson. It was entered into the 1954 Cannes Film Festival.

== Cast ==
- Folke Sundquist as Prisoner
- Georg Rydeberg as Ledin
- Nils Hallberg as Tom
- Lennart Lindberg as Narrator
- Erik Hell as Bouncer
- Yngve Nordwall as Vicar (as Yngve Nordvall)
- Sissi Kaiser as Lunnaja
- Dagny Lind as Bouncer's Mother
