= The Vicious Circle (1967 film) =

1967 film

- Directed by: Arne Mattsson
- Written by: Elsa Prawitz
- Starring: Gunnel Lindblom; Erik Hell; Gio Petré
- Cinematography: Lasse Björne
- Edited by: Carl-Olov Skeppstedt
- Production company: A-Produktion
- Distributed by: Svensk Filmindustri
- Release date: 5 October 1967
- Running time: 90 minutes
- Country: Sweden
- Language: Swedish

The Vicious Circle (Swedish: Den onda cirkeln) is a 1967 Swedish drama film directed by Arne Mattsson and starring Gunnel Lindblom, Erik Hell and Gio Petré. It was shot at the Råsunda Studios in Stockholm. The film's sets were designed by the art director P.A. Lundgren.

== Cast ==
- Gunnel Lindblom as Maria
- Erik Hell as The Father
- Gio Petré as Inger
- Mathias Henrikson as Sten
- Marie-Louise Håkansson as Eva
- Heinz Hopf as Man on Beach

== Bibliography ==
- Björklund, Elisabet & Larsson, Mariah. Swedish Cinema and the Sexual Revolution: Critical Essays. McFarland, 2016.
- Qvist, Per Olov & von Bagh, Peter. Guide to the Cinema of Sweden and Finland. Greenwood Publishing Group, 2000.
