= Volodja Semitjov =

Russian-born Swedish writer

- Born: 1 July 1912; Saint Petersburg, Russian Empire
- Died: 10 January 1985 (aged 72); Stockholm, Sweden
- Occupation: Screenwriter
- Years active: 1950–1985 (film)

Volodja Semitjov (1912–1985) was a Russian-born screenwriter, journalist and novelist who settled and worked in Sweden. The son of the writer Vladimir Semitjov, the family emigrated to Sweden in 1923. His younger brother was Eugen Semitjov.

== Selected filmography ==
- When Love Came to the Village (1950)
- One Summer of Happiness (1951)
- Four Times Love (1951)
- The Clang of the Pick (1952)
- Bread of Love (1953)
- Young Summer (1954)
- The Girl in the Rain (1955)
- Seventeen Years Old (1957)
- A Lion in Town (1959)
- Every Day Isn't Sunday (1959)
- The Invisible Terror (1963)
- Sailors (1964)
- The Girl from the Islands (1964)
- Här kommer bärsärkarna (1965)
- Mask of Murder (1985)

== Bibliography ==
- Cowie, Peter & Elley, Derek. World Filmography: 1967. Fairleigh Dickinson University Press, 1977.
- Kwiatkowski, Aleksander. Swedish Film Classics: A Pictorial Survey of 25 Films from 1913 to 1957. Courier Dover Publications, 1983.
