= Tällberg =

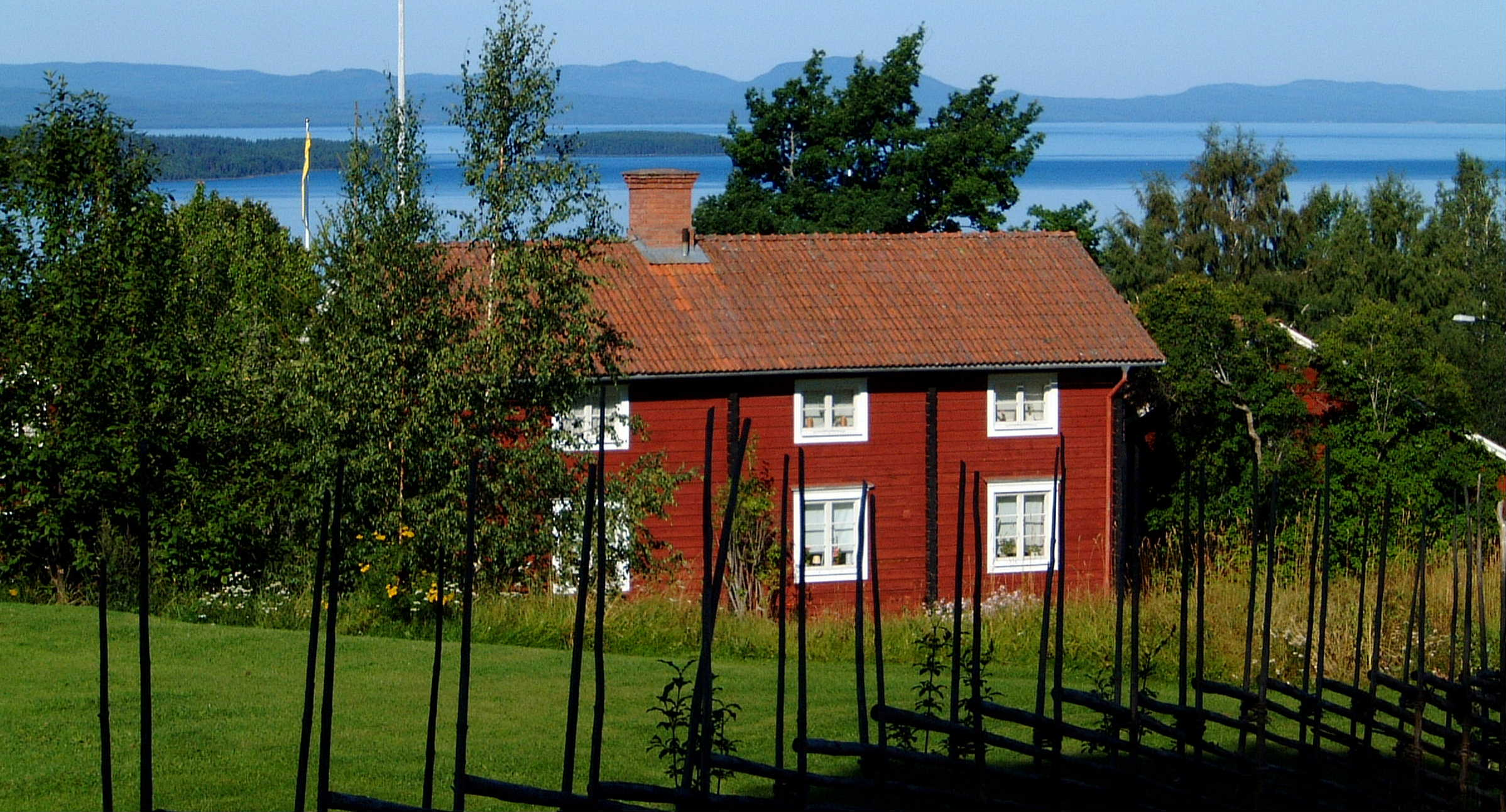
- A typical house in Tällberg

- Location within Dalarna Location within Sweden
- Coordinates: 60°49′N 15°00′E
- Country: Sweden
- Province: Dalarna
- County: Dalarna County
- Municipality: Leksand Municipality

Area
  - Total: 3.08 km^{2} (1.19 sq mi)

Population (31 December 2010)
  - Total: 606
  - Density: 197/km^{2} (510/sq mi)
- Time zone: UTC+1 (CET)
  - Summer (DST): UTC+2 (CEST)

Tällberg (Swedish pronunciation: [ˈtɛ̂lːbærj]) is a small village located in Leksand Municipality, Dalarna County in Sweden. It is situated on the shore of Lake Siljan, in the northern part of Leksand. A special character of the village is that all houses and buildings are made of wood, such as timber or log. The village itself has about 200 permanent residents and a further 400 people have holiday cottages. There are eight hotels in the village and it has developed from a farmer's village in the beginning of 1900 to one of the most known tourist and visitor resorts in Sweden.

== Notable people ==
- Anita Björk, actress
