= Lovely Is the Summer Night =

1961 Swedish film

- Theatrical release poster
- Directed by: Arne Mattsson
- Written by: Maria Lang
- Based on: Kung Liljekonvalje av dungen by Maria Lang
- Produced by: Waldemar Bergendahl
- Starring: Karl-Arne Holmsten; Christina Carlwind; Per Oscarsson
- Cinematography: Tony Forsberg
- Edited by: Wic Kjellin
- Music by: Harry Arnold
- Production company: Europa Film
- Distributed by: Europa Film
- Release date: 17 August 1961
- Running time: 102 minutes
- Country: Sweden
- Language: Swedish

Lovely Is the Summer Night (Swedish: Ljuvlig är sommarnatten) is a 1961 Swedish mystery thriller film directed by Arne Mattsson. The film stars Karl-Arne Holmsten, Christina Carlwind, Per Oscarsson and Folke Sundquist. It was shot at the Sundbyberg Studios of Europa Film in Stockholm. The film's sets were designed by the art directors Bertil Duroj and Arne Åkermark. It is an adaptation of a detective novel by Dagmar Lange (Maria Lang), who wrote the script for the film herself. It is a sequel to the 1960 film When Darkness Falls.

== Cast ==
- Karl-Arne Holmsten as Christer Wijk
- Christina Carlwind as Anneli Hammar
- Elisabeth Odén as Dina Richardsson, Anneli's best friend
- Per Oscarsson as Lars-Ove Larsson, Anneli's childhood friend
- Folke Sundquist as Joakim Kruse, Anneli's fiancé
- Sif Ruud as Gretel Ström, Annelis mother
- Erik Hell as Egon Ström, Annelis stepfather
- Stig Järrel as Sebastian Petrén, Anneli's boss
- Hjördis Petterson as Fanny Falkman, florist
- Angelo Zanolli as Mats Norrgård
- Märta Arbin as Helena Wijk, Christers mother
- Holger Löwenadler as Inspector
- Dagmar Olsson as Livia Petrén
- Agneta Prytz as Olivia Petrén
- Allan Edwall as Luffaren
- Sven-Eric Gamble as Truck Driver
- Curt Masreliez as Ahlgren
- Elsa Prawitz as Camilla Martin
- John Norrman as Forest Warden
- Tekla Sjöblom as Gustava Eriksson
- Curt Löwgren as Matsäcken
- Monica Karlsson as Eva
- Julia Cæsar as Dresser
- Carl-Axel Elfving as Frisör-Kalle
- Mona Geijer-Falkner as Tale-telling Woman
- Tommy Johnson as Young Man
- Per Johnsson as Unit Manager
- Åke Lindström as Man
- Sune Mangs as Jailer
- Sten Mattsson as Stage Manager
- John Melin as Head Waiter
- Karin Miller as Mrs. Gehlin
- Marrit Ohlsson as Gossip Lady
- Bellan Roos as Tale-telling Woman
- Bo Samuelsson as Mailman
- Hanny Schedin as Tale-telling Woman
- Arne Strand as Vicar

== Bibliography ==
- Björklund, Elisabet & Larsson, Mariah. Swedish Cinema and the Sexual Revolution: Critical Essays. McFarland, 2016.
- Qvist, Per Olov & von Bagh, Peter. Guide to the Cinema of Sweden and Finland. Greenwood Publishing Group, 2000.
