= Getting Married (1955 film) =

1955 film

- Directed by: Anders Henrikson
- Written by: Kathrine Aurell; Tage Aurell
- Based on: Getting Married by August Strindberg
- Starring: Anita Björk; Elsa Carlsson; Edvin Adolphson
- Cinematography: Karl-Erik Alberts
- Edited by: Wic Kjellin
- Music by: Herbert Sandberg
- Production company: Europa Film
- Distributed by: Europa Film
- Release date: 19 September 1955
- Running time: 74 minutes
- Country: Sweden
- Language: Swedish

Getting Married (Swedish: Giftas) is a 1955 Swedish drama film directed by Anders Henrikson and starring Anita Björk, Elsa Carlsson and Edvin Adolphson. It was shot at the Sundbyberg Studios of Europa Film in Stockholm. The film's sets were designed by the art director Arne Åkermark. It is based on the short story collection Getting Married by August Strindberg. It is also known by the alternative title Of Love and Lust, the name under which it was given on its 1959 United States release alongside A Doll's House. The film premiered on September 19, 1955, at the Saga cinema in Stockholm.

== Cast ==
- Anita Björk as Helene
- Anders Henrikson as Albert Sund
- Elsa Carlsson as Emilia
- Edvin Adolphson as Gen. Jakob
- Gerda Lundequist as Her Royal Highness
- Herman Ahlsell as Lieutenant
- Ragnar Arvedson as Lieutenant Colonel
- Renée Björling as Woman on carriage
- Astrid Bodin as Lova, housemaid
- Artur Cederborgh as Johansson
- Gösta Cederlund as Colonel
- Nancy Dalunde as Aunt Emilia's guest
- Märta Dorff as Aunt Emilia's guest
- Edvin Fredrikson as Teacher
- Leif Hedenberg as Lieutenant
- Olle Hilding as Farm hand
- Linnéa Hillberg as Malin
- Inger Juel as Professor's wife
- Holger Löwenadler as Docent
- Curt Löwgren as Groom
- Ellika Mann as Girl at the ball
- Gull Natorp as Colonel's wife
- Tommy Nilson as Cavalryman
- Ingemar Pallin as Lieutenant
- Emy Storm as Maid
- Håkan Westergren as Docent
- Carl-Gunnar Wingård as Docent
- Signe Wirff as Aunt Emilia's guest

== Bibliography ==
- Qvist, Per Olav; Bagh, Peter von (2000-03-30). Guide to the Cinema of Sweden and Finland. Bloomsbury Academic. ISBN 978-0-313-30377-7.
