= Birgit Kronström =

Finnish actress and singer (1905–1979)

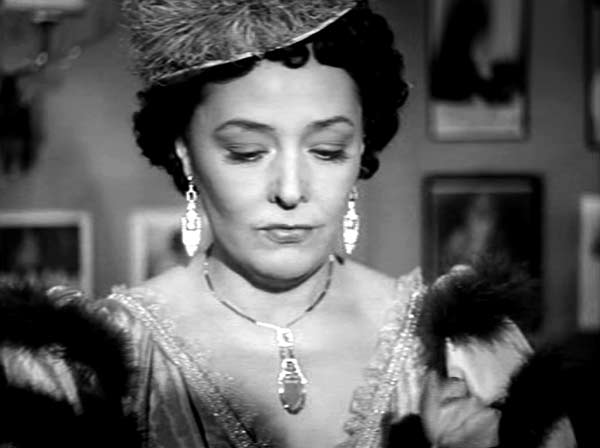
- Birgit Krönström
- Born: 23 February 1905; Helsinki, Finland
- Died: 23 July 1979 (aged 74); Helsinki, Finland
- Occupation(s): Actor, singer
- Years active: 1930's-1940's

Birgit Kronström (23 February 1905 – 23 July 1979) was a Finnish actress and singer.

== Career ==
Kronström studied singing at the Conservatory and then performing arts at the Svenska Teatern, Helsinki's Swedish-language theater.

Her first film role was in Finland, in the 1932 film, Olenko minä tullut haaremiin! (I've Joined a Harem!). This was followed in 1934 by Minä ja ministeri (Me and the Minister), directed by Risto Orkon. In 1938, directed by Orkon, Kronström was in Markan tähden (Movie Star of the Markka).

After the Second World War her films included, Poretta, Onnellinen ministeri (Happy Minister) and Avioliittoyhtiö (Marriage Company). In the 1950s Kronström appeared in two Finnish films, the comedy Amor Hoi and Morsiusseppele (The Bridal Wreath), a rural romance. Her last screen role was in the Swedish film Flickan i frack in 1956.

Birgit's first husband, from 1938-1943, was opera singer Bjorn Forsell (1915–1975). Their son, Johnny Forsell was a pop singer in the early 1960s. Kronström's second husband from 1944-1953 was opera singer, actor and vocal teacher Ture Ara.

== Discography ==
Markan tähden / Päin onnen rantaa (Columbia DY 187 • 1938)
Shampanjakuhertelua (Odeon A 228611 • 1942) Tauno Palon kanssa
Pikku Annikki (Odeon A 228645 • 1942)
Hetkinen rakkautta (Odeon A 228660 • 1942) Tauno Palon kanssa
Säg de med en rumba (Columbia DY 379 • 1942)
Itke en lemmen tähden (Columbia DY 385 • 1942)
Katupoikien laulu (Columbia DY 387 • 1942)
Amor hoi (Leijona T 0502 • 1950)

== Filmography ==
- Olenko minä tullut haaremiin! (1932)
- Minä ja ministeri (1934)
- Markan tähden (1938)
- Kyökin puolella (1940)
- Eulalia-täti (1940)
- Poretta eli Keisarin uudet pisteet (1941)
- Onnellinen ministeri (1941)
- Avioliittoyhtiö (1942)
- Hevoshuijari (1943)
- Irmeli, seitsentoistavuotias (1948)
- Katupeilin takana (1949)
- Amor hoi! (1950)
- Morsiusseppele (1954)
- The Girl in Tails (1956)
