= Anita Björk =

Swedish actress (1923-2012)

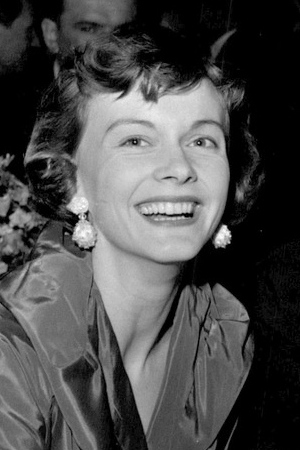
- Björk in 1953
- Born: Anita Barbro Kristina Björk; 25 April 1923; Tällberg, Sweden
- Died: 24 October 2012 (aged 89); Stockholm, Sweden
- Occupation: Actress
- Years active: 1942–2000
- Spouses: Olof Bergström (m. 1945–1951) Stig Dagerman (m. 1953–1954) Lasse Lindqvist (m. 1962–1970)
- Children: Jonas Bergström

Anita Björk (25 April 1923 – 24 October 2012) was a Swedish actress.

Björk was born in Tällberg, Dalarna, and attended the Royal Dramatic Training Academy from 1942 to 1945. She was a leading lady of Swedish theatre for many years and worked on the national stage, the Royal Dramatic Theatre, from 1945 onwards. She played more than 100 roles over the years and is therefore considered one of the greatest and most prolific actors of the Royal Dramatic Theatre.

Anita Björk played leading roles in film in a number of genres, including thrillers and crime mystery dramas such as Det kom en gäst (1947), Moln över Hellesta (1956), Damen i svart (1958), Mannekäng i rött (1958) and Tärningen är kastad (1960). Her most famous role was probably her title role in Alf Sjöberg's film adaption of Strindberg's Miss Julie (1951) that was awarded the grand prize at Cannes Film Festival.

In the book-length interview Hitchcock/Truffaut (Simon and Schuster, 1967), Hitchcock said he had hired Björk as the female lead for I Confess in 1952 after seeing her in Miss Julie. However, when Björk arrived in Hollywood with her lover Stig Dagerman and their baby, Jack L. Warner, the head of Warner Brothers insisted that Hitchcock should find another actress.

She was married to Olof Bergström (1945–1951) and to Stig Dagerman (from 1953). After Dagerman's death in 1954, she had a relationship with author Graham Greene.

In 2009, Björk performed in A. R. Gurney's play Kärleksbrev (Love Letters) at the Royal Dramatic Theatre opposite Jan-Olof Strandberg (Lilla scenen; March–April, 2009).

Björk died on 24 October 2012 at the age of 89.

== Partial filmography ==
- 1942: Himlaspelet (a.k.a. The Heavenly Play / The Road to Heaven) – Anna Jesper
- 1944: Count Only the Happy Moments – Lilian Lind
- 1946: 100 dragspel och en flicka – Elsa Borell
- 1947: No Way Back – Evelyn
- 1947: Kvinna utan ansikte (a.k.a. Woman Without a Face) – Frida Grande
- 1947: Det kom en gäst – Siv
- 1948: On These Shoulders – Birgit Larsson
- 1949: Realm of Man – Birgit Maria Larsson
- 1950: The Quartet That Split Up – Maj Andersson
- 1951: Fröken Julie (a.k.a. Miss Julie) – Miss Julie
- 1952: Kvinnors väntan (a.k.a. Secrets of Women) – Rakel
- 1952: Han glömde henne aldrig – Karin Engström
- 1954: Night People – 'Hoffy' Hoffmeier
- 1954: The Witch
- 1955: Getting Married (a.k.a. Of Love and Lust) – Helene
- 1955: Hamlet (TV Movie) – Ofelia, hans dotter
- 1955: The Cornet – Gräfin von Zathmar
- 1956: Moln över Hellesta (a.k.a. Moon Over Hellesta) – Margareta Snellman
- 1956: The Song of the Scarlet Flower – Kyllikki Malm
- 1957: A Guest in His Own House – Eva Dahl
- 1958: Damen i svart (a.k.a. The Lady in Black) – Inger von Schilden
- 1958: Körkarlen (a.k.a. The Phantom Carriage) – Mrs. Holm
- 1958: Mannekäng i rött (a.k.a. Mannequin in Red) – Birgitta Lindell
- 1960: The Die Is Cast – Rebecca Striid
- 1960: Good Friends and Faithful Neighbours – Mrs. Yvonne Frejer
- 1961: Square of Violence – Sophia
- 1962: The Lady in White – Helen G:son Lundberg
- 1963: Misantropen (TV Movie) – Célimène
- 1964: Älskande par (a.k.a. Loving Couples) – Petra von Pahlen
- 1966: Utro
- 1967: Tofflan – Erna Alm
- 1968: Komedi i Hägerskog – Narcissa
- 1969: Ådalen 31 (a.k.a. Adalen 31 / Adalen Riots) – Hedvig, Annas mor
- 1978: Tribadernas natt (TV Movie) – Siri von Essen
- 1979: Arven – Märta Skaug
- 1981: The Witch Hunt – Ingeborg Eriksdotter Jaatun
- 1986: Amorosa – Arvida
- 1989: Flickan vid stenbänken (TV Series) – Amalia
- 1992: Markisinnan de Sade (TV Movie, Ingmar Bergman) – Madame de Montreuil
- 1992: Den goda viljan (a.k.a. Best Intentions) (script: Ingmar Bergman) – Drottning Victoria
- 1993: Snoken (TV Series) – Harriet Lindholm
- 1996: Enskilda samtal (a.k.a. Private Confessions / Conversations) (TV Movie; Ingmar Bergman) – Karin Åkerblom
- 1997: Larmar och gör sig till (a.k.a. In the Presence of a Clown) (TV Movie, Ingmar Bergman) – Anna Åkerblom
- 1998: Sanna ögonblick – Karin
- 2000: Bildmakarna (a.k.a. The Image Makers) (TV Movie, Ingmar Bergman) – Selma Lagerlöf (final film role)
