= Elsa Prawitz =

Swedish actress (1932–2001)

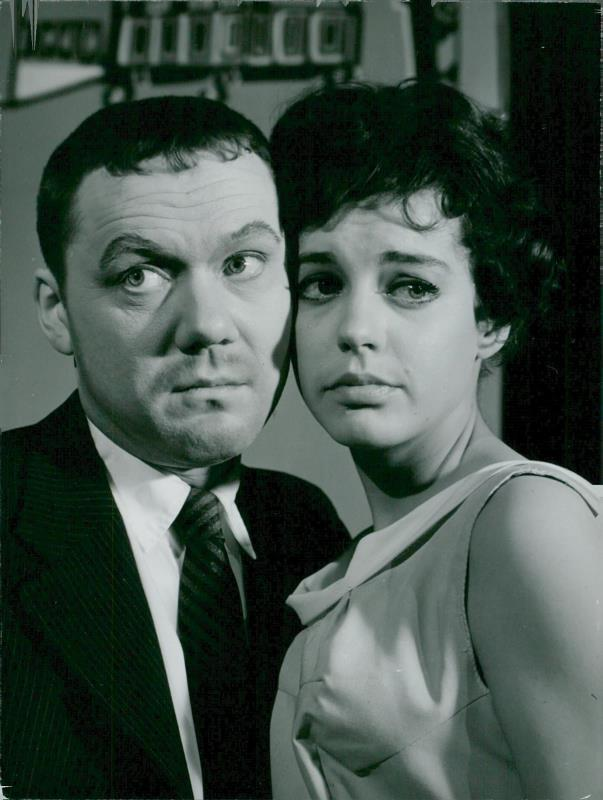
- With Olof Thunberg in 1959
- Born: 22 February 1932; Stockholm, Sweden
- Died: 1 May 2001 (aged 69); Stockholm, Sweden
- Occupation: Actress
- Years active: 1951–1975 (film)

Elsa Prawitz (22 February 1932 – 1 May 2001) was a Swedish film and stage actress.

== Selected filmography ==
- Divorced (1951)
- The Road to Klockrike (1953)
- Salka Valka (1954)
- Enchanted Walk (1954)
- Men in the Dark (1955)
- Whoops! (1955)
- Night Child (1956)
- The Girl in Tails (1956)
- Mannequin in Red (1958)
- Summer and Sinners (1960)
- When Darkness Falls (1960)
- Lovely Is the Summer Night (1961)
- Hide and Seek (1963)
- Morianna (1965)
- Woman of Darkness (1966)
- The Reluctant Sadist (1967)
- The Vicious Circle (1967)

== Bibliography ==
- Goble, Alan. The Complete Index to Literary Sources in Film. Walter de Gruyter, 1999.
- Steene, Birgitta. Ingmar Bergman: A Reference Guide. Amsterdam University Press, 2005.
