= Storm over Tjurö =

1954 film

- Directed by: Arne Mattsson
- Written by: Ivar Ahlstedt; Gustaf Hellström
- Based on: Storm over Tjurö by Gustaf Hellström
- Produced by: Rune Waldekranz
- Starring: Adolf Jahr; Sigge Fürst; Gunnel Broström
- Cinematography: Sven Nykvist
- Edited by: Carl-Olov Skeppstedt
- Music by: Lille Bror Söderlundh
- Production company: Sandrews
- Distributed by: Sandrew-Baumanfilm
- Release date: 19 July 1954
- Running time: 109 minutes
- Country: Sweden
- Language: Swedish

Storm over Tjurö (Swedish: Storm över Tjurö) is a 1954 Swedish drama film directed by Arne Mattsson and starring Adolf Jahr, Sigge Fürst and Gunnel Broström. It was shot at the Centrumateljéerna Studios in Stockholm. The film's sets were designed by the art director Nils Nilsson. It was based on the 1935 novel of the same title by Gustaf Hellström.

== Cast ==
- Adolf Jahr as Karl Oskar Bohm
- Sigge Fürst as Gottfrid Johansson
- Gunnel Broström as Tekla Bladh
- Margaretha Krook as Augusta
- Märta Dorff as Mrs. Sofia Bohm
- Nils Hallberg as Nicklas Boutkiewics
- Åke Grönberg as Reinhold Karlsson
- Georg Rydeberg as Gustafson, Secretary
- Gösta Gustafson as Sjöholm
- Sif Ruud as Alma Persson
- Erik Hell as Vicar
- Lissi Alandh as Lisa, Waitress
- John Norrman as Parish Constable
- Axel Högel as Judge
- John Melin as Zachrisson
- Svea Holst as Midwife
- Astrid Bodin as Woman
- Stig Johanson as Local Inhabitant
- Elsa Ebbesen as Maria, the Vicar's Housemaid
- Åke Lindström as Sailor
- Wilma Malmlöf as Curious Woman
- Georg Skarstedt as Johansson, Sofia's Father
- Brita Öberg as Sofia's Mother
- Birger Åsander as Captain at Östanå I

== Bibliography ==
- Krawc, Alfred. International Directory of Cinematographers, Set- and Costume Designers in Film: Denmark, Finland, Norway, Sweden (from the beginnings to 1984). Saur, 1986.
- Warme, Lars G. A History of Swedish Literature. University of Nebraska Press, 1 Jan 1996.
