= Seventeen Years Old =

1957 film

- Directed by: Alf Kjellin
- Written by: Elisabeth Beskow (novel); Volodja Semitjov; Alf Kjellin
- Produced by: Rune Waldekranz
- Starring: Ingeborg Nyberg; Randi Kolstad; Isa Quensel
- Cinematography: Rune Ericson
- Edited by: Eric Nordemar
- Music by: Charles Redland
- Production company: Sandrews
- Distributed by: Sandrew-Baumanfilm
- Release date: 21 December 1957
- Running time: 101 minutes
- Country: Sweden
- Language: Swedish

Seventeen Years Old (Swedish: Sjutton år) is a 1957 Swedish drama film directed by Alf Kjellin and starring Ingeborg Nyberg, Randi Kolstad and Isa Quensel. It was shot at the Centrumateljéerna Studios in Stockholm. The film's sets were designed by the art director Nils Nilsson.

== Cast ==
- Ingeborg Nyberg as Anna-Lena Sander
- Tage Severin as Allan Bentick
- Randi Kolstad as Lydia Hennert, Singer
- Georg Rydeberg as Emil Bentick
- Isa Quensel as Agnes Bentick
- Naima Wifstrand as Clara
- Gun Hellberg as Brita Sander
- Bengt Brunskog as Erik Sander
- Kerstin Dunér as Karin Strand
- Ulf Lindqvist as Uno Vallius
- Birger Lensanderas Jernberg
- Helge Hagerman as Bengt Sander, Priest
- Bo Samuelsson as Sune Karlsson, Mechanic
- John Kilián as Taky

== Bibliography ==
- Qvist, Per Olov & von Bagh, Peter. Guide to the Cinema of Sweden and Finland. Greenwood Publishing Group, 2000.
