= Här kommer bärsärkarna =

1965 film

- Film poster
- Directed by: Arne Mattsson
- Written by: Folke Nystrand; Volodja Semitjov
- Produced by: Inge Ivarson
- Starring: Carl-Gustaf Lindstedt
- Cinematography: Kalle Bergholm; Stelvio Massi
- Music by: Carlo Savina
- Release date: 3 May 1965
- Running time: 99 minutes
- Country: Sweden
- Language: Swedish

Här kommer bärsärkarna (transl. Here come the berserkers) is a 1965 Swedish adventure film directed by Arne Mattsson and starring Carl-Gustaf Lindstedt and Dirch Passer.

The sets were recycled from the 1964 adventure film The Long Ships.

== Cast ==
- Carl-Gustaf Lindstedt as Glum
- Dirch Passer as Garm
- Åke Söderblom as Hjorvard
- Nils Hallberg as Cassius
- Loredana Nusciak as Veronica
- Walter Chiari as Pollo
- Karl-Arne Holmsten as Olav
- Elisabeth Odén as Vigdis
- Carl-Axel Elfving as Mullgott
- Curt Ericson as Tjarve
- Hans Wallbom as Kutt
- Olof Huddén as Kaptenen
- Daniela Igliozzi as Fatima
- Valeria Fabrizi as Elina
