= Sailors (film) =

1964 film

- Directed by: Arne Mattsson
- Written by: Lajos Lajtai; Arne Mattsson; Gösta Rybrant; Volodja Semitjov
- Produced by: Inge Ivarson
- Starring: Dirch Passer
- Cinematography: Kalle Bergholm; Sreco Pavlocic
- Edited by: Lennart Wallén
- Release date: 3 October 1964
- Running time: 108 minutes
- Country: Sweden
- Language: Swedish

Sailors (Swedish: Blåjackor) is a 1964 Swedish comedy film directed by Arne Mattsson and starring Dirch Passer and Anita Lindblom.

As the Swedish cruiser Svea Lejon comes to the Mediterranean port of Montebello, the crew find that the girls are full of pleasure, especially the students at Monsieur Nitouche Ballet School.

== Cast ==
- Dirch Passer - Sam
- Anita Lindblom - Carmen
- Åke Söderblom - Nappe von Lohring
- Nils Hallberg - Nitouche
- Elisabeth Odén - Eva
- Per Asplin - Bob
- Siv Ericks - Mrs. Plunkett
- Grynet Molvig - Pia
- Carl-Axel Elfving - Fifi
- Arve Opsahl - Månsson
- Lillevi Bergman - Mia
- Tomas Bolme - Big Man / as Bolme, Thomas
- Eric Brage - Ship's officer
- Curt Ericson - Olsson
- Sven Holmberg - Second man with draft-order in El Bajo
- Olof Huddén - Swahn
- Nils Kihlberg - Söderman
- Lennart Lindberg - Berg
- Gustaf Lövås - First man with draft-order in Stockholm and El Bajo
- Marianne Mohaupt - Fia
- Cence Sulevska - Ballet dancer
- Hans Wallbom - Sören
- Birger Åsander - Second man with draft-order in Stockholm (uncredited)
- Carl-Gustaf Lindstedt - Ship's Doctor (uncredited)
