= The Girl in Tails (1956 film) =

1956 film

- Directed by: Arne Mattsson
- Written by: Herbert Grevenius
- Based on: The Girl in Tails by Hjalmar Bergman
- Produced by: Rune Waldekranz
- Starring: Maj-Britt Nilsson; Folke Sundquist; Anders Henrikson
- Cinematography: Sven Nykvist
- Edited by: Carl-Olov Skeppstedt
- Music by: Håkan von Eichwald
- Production company: Sandrews
- Distributed by: Sandrew-Baumanfilm
- Release date: 15 October 1956
- Running time: 98 minutes
- Country: Sweden
- Language: Swedish

The Girl in Tails (Swedish: Flickan i frack) is a 1956 Swedish comedy film directed by Arne Mattsson and starring Maj-Britt Nilsson, Folke Sundquist and Anders Henrikson. It was shot at the Centrumateljéerna Studios in Stockholm. The film's sets were designed by the art director Nils Nilsson. It was based on the 1925 novel of the same name by Hjalmar Bergman. The novel was previously also adapted into a 1926 silent film of the same title.

== Synopsis ==
In a small Swedish town, a young woman causes a stir for the small population by wearing male evening dress to her prom.

== Cast ==
- Maj-Britt Nilsson as Katja Kock
- Folke Sundquist as Ludwig von Battwhyl
- Anders Henrikson as Headmaster Starck
- Naima Wifstrand as Widow Hyltenius
- Sigge Fürst as Karl-Axel Kock
- Hjördis Petterson as Colonel's wife
- Lennart Lindberg as Curry Kock
- Elsa Prawitz as Brita Bjurling
- Georg Rydeberg as Paulin
- Sif Ruud as Lotten Brenner
- Torsten Winge as Karl-Otto
- Birgit Kronström as Lizzy Willman
- Erik Berglund as Biörck
- Ester Roeck Hansen as Karolina Willman
- Erik Strandmark as Blom
- Kerstin Dunér as Eva Biörk
- Lasse Krantz as Lindkvist
- Rut Holm as Mari
- Pierre Fränckel as Johan Markurell
- Julia Cæsar as Modig
- Sven Magnusson as Ström
- Stina Ståhle as Mrs. Markurell
- John Norrman as Glad
- Magnus Kesster as Mr. Markurell
- Curt Löwgren as Karlsson
- Einar Axelsson as Björner
- Manne Grünberger as Klein
- Ludde Juberg as Stoker
- John Melin as Olsson
- Carl-Axel Elfving as Constable
- Stig Johanson as Postman
- Per-Axel Arosenius as Farm hand
- Albin Erlandzon as Farm Hand
- Marrit Ohlsson as Musician
- Georg Skarstedt as Musician

== Bibliography ==
- Qvist, Per Olov & von Bagh, Peter. Guide to the Cinema of Sweden and Finland. Greenwood Publishing Group, 2000.
