= Åke Lindström =

Swedish actor

- Born: 22 July 1928; Söderhamn, Sweden
- Died: 26 December 2002 (aged 74); Stockholm, Sweden
- Occupation: Actor
- Years active: 1950-2001

Åke Lindström (22 July 1928 – 26 December 2002) was a Swedish actor, voice actor and film director. He appeared in more than 40 films and television shows between 1950 and 2001.

== Selected filmography ==
- The Kiss on the Cruise (1950)
- Storm Over Tjurö (1954)
- Salka Valka (1954)
- The Song of the Scarlet Flower (1956)
- A Goat in the Garden (1958)
- The Judge (1960)
- Lovely Is the Summer Night (1961)
- Badarna (1968)
- The Corridor (1968)
- The Touch (1971)
- Pistol (1973)
- The Last Adventure (1974)
- David and the Magic Pearl (1988)
- The Little Mermaid (1989)
