= Unmarried Mothers (1953 film) =

1953 film

- Directed by: Hans Dahlin; Bengt Logardt
- Written by: Birgitta de Vylder-Bellander (novel); Bengt Logardt
- Produced by: Bengt Logardt
- Starring: Eva Stiberg; Bengt Logardt; Öllegård Wellton; Lennart Lindberg
- Cinematography: Rune Ericson
- Edited by: Carl-Olov Skeppstedt
- Music by: Roland Eiworth
- Production company: Sandrews
- Distributed by: Sandrew-Baumanfilm
- Release date: 16 January 1953
- Running time: 107 minutes
- Country: Sweden
- Language: Swedish

Unmarried Mothers (Swedish: Ogift fader sökes) is a 1953 Swedish drama film directed by Hans Dahlin and Bengt Logardt and starring Eva Stiberg, Logardt, Öllegård Wellton and Lennart Lindberg. It was shot at the Centrumateljéerna Studios in Stockholm with location shooting around Vaxholm. The film's sets were designed by the art director Bibi Lindström.

== Cast ==
- Eva Stiberg as Irene Lindblad
- Bengt Logardt as Dr. Stig Hellgren
- Öllegård Wellton as Inga Lind
- Lennart Lindberg as Gösta Hedengran
- Lissi Alandh as Sippi
- Erik Strandmark as Ned
- Anne-Margrethe Björlin as Ann-Margreth Söderberg
- Per Sjöstrand as Erik Eliasson
- Gunlög Hagberg as Rut Jonsson
- Ulla Smidje as Ann-Marie Andersson
- Ulla Holmberg as Eva Waller
- Gerd Ericsson as Mary Ellinder
- Märta Dorff as Mrs. Berglund
- Hans Dahlin as Arne Bergström
- Gull Natorp as Elna, Inga's Supervisor
- Eivor Engelbrektsson as Marie Wallin
- Mona Geijer-Falkner as Nurse
- Gösta Gustafson as Mr. Olsson
- Sven Holmberg as Drunk
- Ragnvi Lindbladh as Adoptive Parent
- Aurore Palmgren as Stepmother
- Lasse Sarri as Tore
- Hanny Schedin as Miss Lindblad
- Rune Stylander as Doctor

== Bibliography ==
- Stevenson, Jack. Scandinavian Blue: The Erotic Cinema of Sweden and Denmark in the 1960s and 1970s. McFarland, 2010.
