= Kungajakt =

1944 film

- Directed by: Alf Sjöberg
- Written by: Karl Ragnar Gierow; Alf Sjöberg
- Starring: Inga Tidblad
- Cinematography: Åke Dahlqvist
- Music by: Lars-Erik Larsson
- Release date: 21 January 1944
- Running time: 92 minutes
- Country: Sweden
- Language: Swedish

Kungajakt (English: The Royal Hunt) is a 1944 Swedish drama film directed by Alf Sjöberg.

== Synopsis ==
In the late 18th-century Sweden, the Russians are plotting to out King Gustav III of Sweden. While fighting to save his king, Lieutenant Rehusen is also fighting for his love.

== Cast ==
- Inga Tidblad as Catherine von Wismar
- Holger Löwenadler as Carl Gustav von Wismar
- Lauritz Falk as Lt. Rehusen
- Erik Hell as Möllersten
- Stig Järrel as Riddercrantz
- Erik Berglund as Tarnow
- Hugo Björne as Adlerhjelm
- Björn Berglund as Lt. Manderberg
- Emil Fjellström as Nordström
- Frank Sundström as Gustaf III
