= Summer and Sinners =

1960 film

- Directed by: Arne Mattsson
- Written by: Willy Breinholst; Erik Pouplier
- Produced by: Lorens Marmstedt
- Starring: Karl-Arne Holmsten; Elsa Prawitz; Yvonne Lombard
- Cinematography: Åke Dahlqvist
- Edited by: Lennart Wallén
- Music by: Torbjörn Lundquist
- Production company: Flora Film
- Distributed by: Sandrews
- Release date: 26 September 1960
- Running time: 104 minutes
- Country: Sweden
- Language: Swedish

Summer and Sinners (Swedish: Sommar och syndare) is a 1960 Swedish comedy film directed by Arne Mattsson and starring Karl-Arne Holmsten, Elsa Prawitz and Yvonne Lombard. The film's sets were designed by the art director Bibi Lindström. It was shot in Eastmancolor. The film was very poorly received, and even some of its own cast members were publicly critical. This marked a turning point in the previously high regard in which Mattsson's films were held.

== Cast ==
- Karl-Arne Holmsten as Emil Horneberg
- Elsa Prawitz as Helga Krus
- Olof Thunberg as Ove Högsbo
- Yvonne Lombard as Heidi Horneberg
- Gio Petré as Liselotte Högsbo
- Yngve Gamlin as Prof. Cornelius
- Lena Granhagen as Mrs. Zitter
- Nils Hallberg as Åke Johansson
- Sture Lagerwall as Sven Molmagen
- Dirch Passer as Kansas Joe
- Sif Ruud as Ms. Prytz

== Bibliography ==
- Björklund, Elisabet & Larsson, Mariah. Swedish Cinema and the Sexual Revolution: Critical Essays. McFarland, 2016.
- Qvist, Per Olov & von Bagh, Peter. Guide to the Cinema of Sweden and Finland. Greenwood Publishing Group, 2000.
