= Pedro Laxalt =

Argentine actor

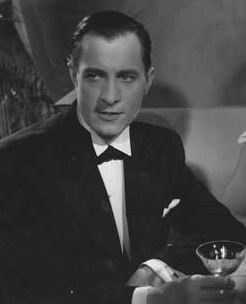
Pedro Laxalt

Pedro Ascarateil Laxalt (15 May 1900 – 31 August 1965) was an Argentine actor of Basque descent from Montevideo. He starred in the 1950 film Campeón a la fuerza.

== Selected filmography ==
- Sombras Portenas (1936)
- The Boys of the Old Days Didn't Use Hair Gel (1937)
- Fuera de la Ley (1937)
- Nobleza Gaucha (1937)
- Los Locos del Cuarto Piso (1937)
- Los Apuros de Claudina (1938)
- Divorcio en Montevideo (1939)
- The Abyss Opens (1945)
- All en el Setenta y Tantos (1945)
- The Gambler (1947)
- Angeles de Uniforme (inedita) (1949)
- Su Ultima Pelea (1949)
- Campeon a la Fuerza (1950)
- Hombres a Precio (1950)
- El Cielo en las Manos (1950)
- Las Aguas Bajan Turbias (1952)
- Marido de Ocasion (1952)
- El Hijo del Crack (1953)
- El Ultimo Cowboy (1954)
- Caidos del Infierno (1954)
- La Tierra del Fuego se Apaga (1955)
- Marianela (1955)
- Beyond Oblivion (Mas Alla del Olvido) (1956)
- Despues del Silencio (1956)
- La Sombra de Safo (1957)
- Spring of Life (1957)
- Una Cita con la Vida (1958)
- Zafra (1959)
- Simiente Humana (1959)
- India (1960)
- Quinto Año Nacional (1961)
- El Bruto (1962)
- Detras de la Mentira (1962)
- Pelota de Cuero - Detras de una Pasion (1963)
- La Terraza (1963)
- Lujuria Tropical (1964)
