= The Word (1943 film) =

1943 Swedish drama film

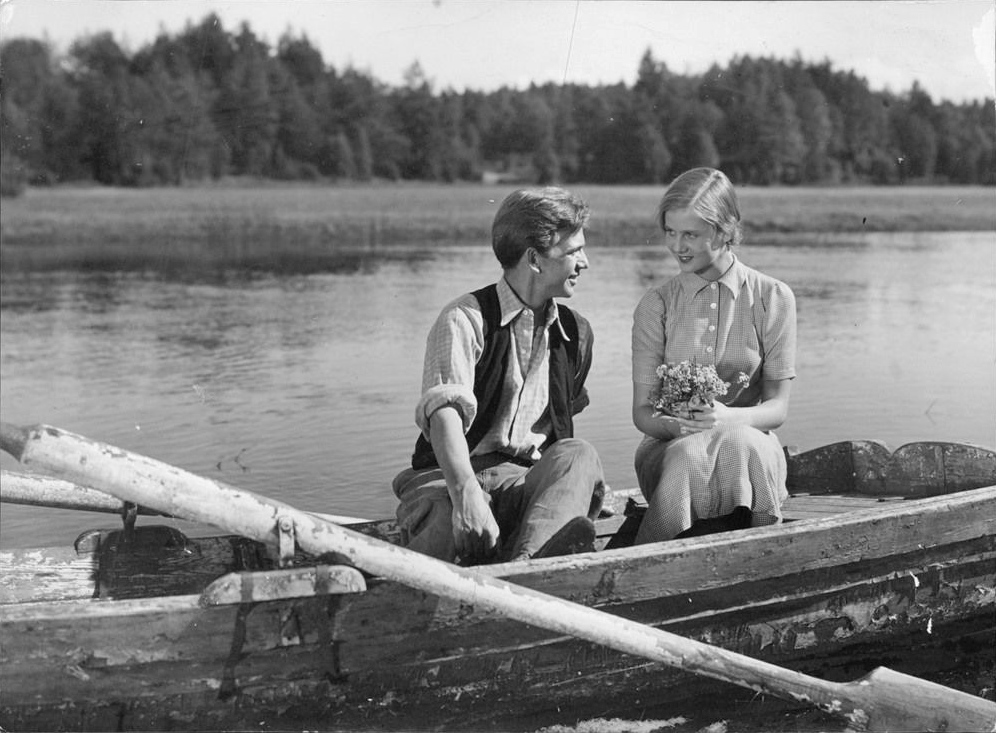
- Still with Stig Olin and Inga Landgré
- Directed by: Gustaf Molander
- Written by: Rune Lindström
- Based on: Ordet; 1925 play by Kaj Munk
- Starring: Victor Sjöström; Holger Löwenadler; Rune Lindström
- Cinematography: Gösta Roosling
- Edited by: Oscar Rosander
- Music by: Sven Sköld
- Distributed by: Svensk Filmindustri
- Release date: 26 December 1943
- Running time: 108 minutes
- Country: Sweden
- Language: Swedish

The Word (Swedish: Ordet) is a 1943 Swedish drama film directed by Gustaf Molander, based on the 1925 play of the same name by Kaj Munk. It preceded the far more well-known adaptation by Carl Th. Dreyer by more than a decade.

== Cast ==
- Victor Sjöström as Knut Borg Sr.
- Holger Löwenadler as Knut
- Rune Lindström as Johannes
- Stig Olin as Anders
- Wanda Rothgardt as Inger
- Gunn Wållgren as Kristina
- Inga Landgré as Ester
- Ludde Gentzel as Petter
- Torsten Hillberg as Dr. Bergman
- Olle Hilding as Brandeus
