= Guest at One's Own Home =

1957 film

- Directed by: Stig Olin
- Written by: Stig Olin
- Produced by: Rune Waldekranz
- Starring: Anita Björk; Lars Ekborg; Alf Kjellin
- Cinematography: Sven Nykvist
- Edited by: Eric Nordemar
- Music by: Bengt Hallberg
- Production company: Sandrew-Bauman
- Distributed by: Sandrew-Baumanfilm
- Release date: 30 September 1957
- Running time: 92 minutes
- Country: Sweden
- Language: Swedish

Guest at One's Own Home (Swedish: Gäst i eget hus) is a 1957 Swedish drama film directed by Stig Olin and starring Anita Björk, Lars Ekborg and Alf Kjellin. It was shot at the Centrumateljéerna Studios in Stockholm and on location around the city. The film's sets were designed by the art director Nils Nilsson.

== Cast ==
- Anita Björk as Eva Dahl
- Lars Ekborg as Boy Lannert
- Alf Kjellin as Age Dahl
- Isa Quensel as Stepmother
- Holger Löwenadler as Fredik Lannert
- Monica Nielsen as Berit
- Barbro Hiort af Ornäs as Lisen
- Claes Thelander as Sten, Doctor
- Aino Taube as Mrs. Brecker
- Birgitta Andersson as Guest
- Sten Ardenstam as Guest
- Sven Arvor as Waiter
- Tom Dan-Bergman as Guest
- Elsa Ebbesen as Mrs. Bergström
- Sten Gester as Guest
- Anne Marie Machnow as Guest
- Karin Miller as Nurse
- Gösta Prüzelius as Doctor
- Astrid Söderbaum as Maid

== Bibliography ==
- Qvist, Per Olov & von Bagh, Peter. Guide to the Cinema of Sweden and Finland. Greenwood Publishing Group, 2000.
