= Rune Lindström (screenwriter) =

Swedish screenwriter (1916–1973)

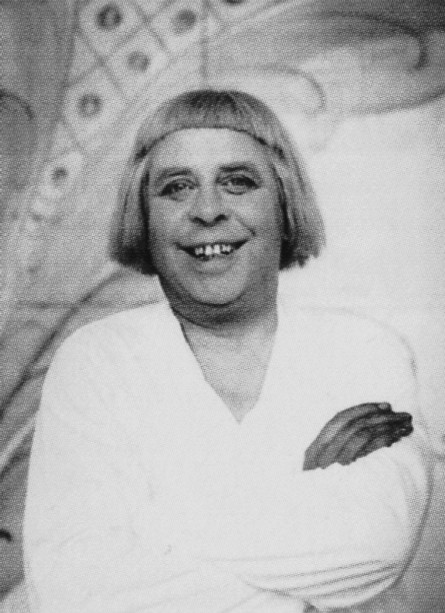
- Rune Lindström in 1944
- Born: 28 April 1916; Fagersta, Dalarna, Sweden
- Died: 25 April 1973 (aged 56); Leksand, Dalarna, Sweden
- Occupations: Screenwriter; Actor
- Years active: 1942-1971
- Spouse: Ingrid Lindström
- Children: Lars; Anders; Olof; Per

Gustaf Rune Lindström (28 April 1916 – 25 April 1973) was a Swedish screenwriter and actor. He wrote for more than 30 films between 1942 and 1971.

== Biography ==
Rune Lindström was a scriptwriter, poet, illustrator, director and actor. He had intended to become a priest and began studying theology at Uppsala University, but interrupted his studies when he had an unexpectedly great success with The Heavenly Play. At the play's premiere in 1941 in the university hall in Uppsala, he played the lead role himself.

Lindström went on to write three well-known plays in Dalarna; in addition to The Heavenly Play, which has been performed in Leksand every summer since 1949, he also wrote Ingmarsspelen in Nås in 1959 and Skinnarspelet, which has been the opening act of the midsummer celebrations in Malung since its premiere in June 1967. In 1946, Lindström was commissioned to read Alfred, Lord Tennyson's poem "Ring Out, Wild Bells" at Skansen at the stroke of midnight.

He wrote several film scripts and also appeared as a film actor. The Heavenly Play was made into a film as early as 1942, with Lindström in the lead role. During the 1960s he was employed by the Stockholm City Theatre.

Lindström also wrote the lyrics to several melodies that have become classics, including "Visa vid midsommartid", "Te' dans mä Karlstatösera" and "Balladen om Joe Hill". As an illustrator, he illustrated Kaj Munk's Jesu liknelser återutgivna för barn and Dalahistorier, among others.

Lindström was awarded the Illis quorum in 1966.

== Selected filmography ==
- The Heavenly Play (1942)
- The Word (1943)
- The Emperor of Portugallia (1944)
- Johansson and Vestman (1946)
- Affairs of a Model (1946)
- Rail Workers (1947)
- I Am with You (1948)
- Vi flyr på Rio (1949)
- Realm of Man (1949)
- Woman in White (1949)
- Dangerous Spring (1949)
- Skipper in Stormy Weather (1951)
- Love (1952)
- For the Sake of My Intemperate Youth (1952)
- Enchanted Walk (1954)
- Salka Valka (1954)
- Men in the Dark (1955)
- The People of Hemsö (1955)
- La Sorcière (1956)
- The Song of the Scarlet Flower (1956)
- The Minister of Uddarbo (1957)
- The Phantom Carriage (1958)
- A Lion in Town (1959)
- Woman of Darkness (1966)

== Notes ==
=== Sources ===
- Bergström, Bernt (1981). "G Rune Lindström". Svenskt biografiskt lexikon (in Swedish). Vol. 23. p. 656.
- "Lindström, G. Rune". Vem är vem? (in Swedish). 1964. p. 510.
- Svenskt konstnärslexikon (in Swedish). Vol. III. Malmö: Allhems Förlag. p. 566.
- "Rune Lindström". Svensk filmdatabas (in Swedish).
