= Peder Sjögren =

Swedish writer

Peder Sjögren (1905–1966), born as Gösta Sjögren, was a Swedish writer who fought in the Spanish Civil War and the Continuation War. Many of his books were based on those experiences.

== Life and works ==
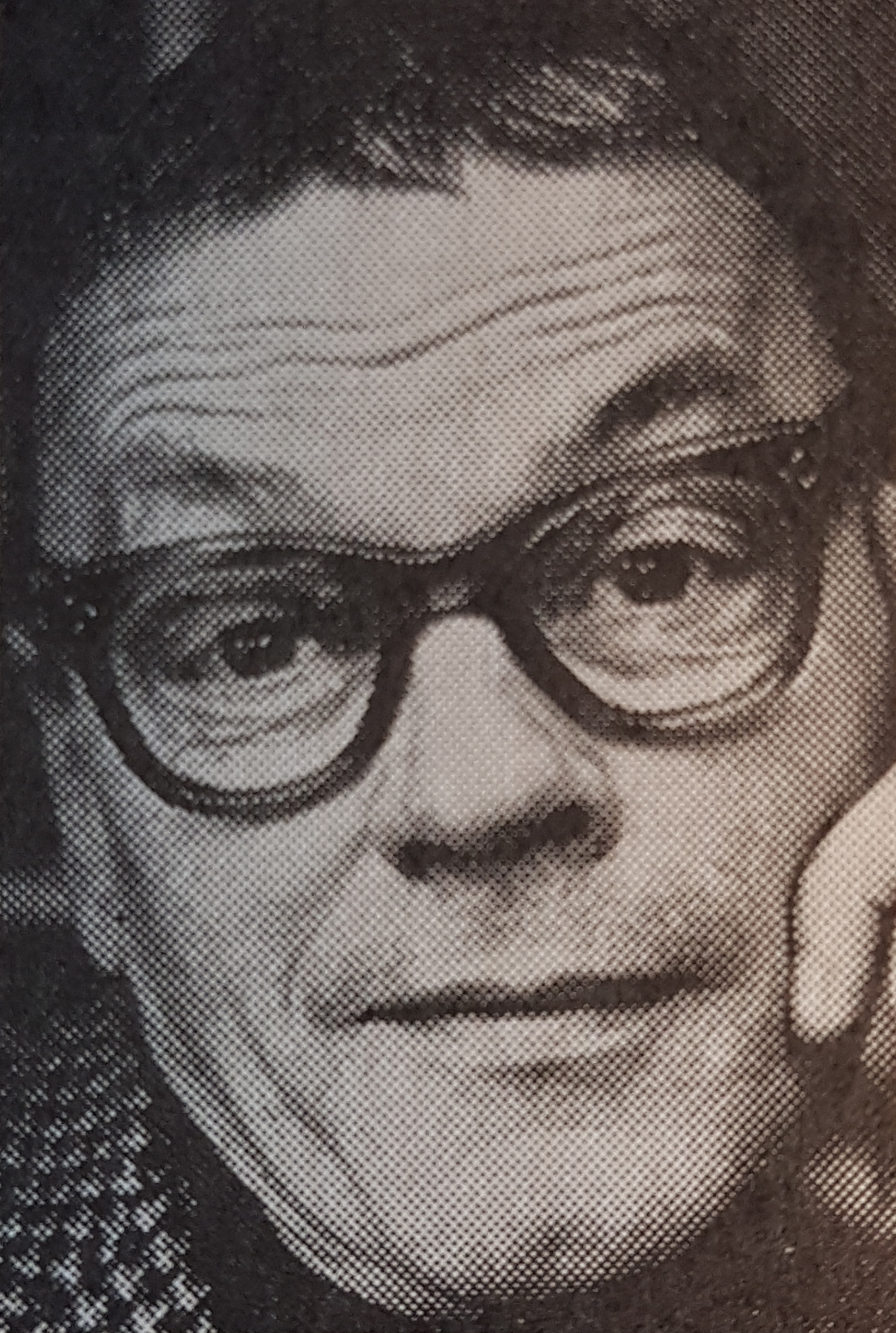
Peder Sjögren

Gösta Tage Filip Sjögren was born in 1905, outside Växjö, in the province of Småland, and at the age of 10 moved to Stockholm. Aged 17, he was sent to Rome, after which he travelled to the Balkans, Spain, North Africa, Poland and Finland. As an antifascist during the Spanish Civil War, he joined the International Brigades and was wounded in combat. His experiences in the war provided him with themes for several of his novels. After his recovery, he was arrested as a suspected spy, but subsequently escaped from Spain on a British warship. Having worked as a journalist, his best articles were collected into his first book, Bar barbar (1937). In spite of this book and occasional radio plays and short stories, Sjögren did not attract attention until the appearance of Black Palms (Svarta palmkronor, 1944), which became a film by Lars-Magnus Lindgren in 1968. His second novel, Bread of Love (Kärlekens bröd, 1945), was based on his experiences as a volunteer in the Finnish Continuation War of 1941-44. A film of the book directed by Arne Mattsson (1953) was banned in Finland.

Sjögren married Vera Alexandrova in 1937 then Lilian Fidler in 1954. He committed suicide in 1966, five days after his second wife died.

== Bibliography ==
- Bar Barbar. Stockholm: Bonniers, 1937. (Reportage)
- Svarta palmkronor (Black Palms). Stockholm: Medéns, 1944; Vingförlaget, 1952; Folket i bild, 1958. (Novel)
- Kärlekens bröd (Bread of Love). Stockholm: Medéns, 1945; Folket i bild, 1954. (Novel) ISBN 0-299-03751-7
- Jag vill gå ned till Thimnath (I Will Down to Thimnath). Stockholm: Medéns, 1947; Tidens bokklub, 1956. (Novel)
- Mannen som försökte smita (The Man Who Tried to Bolt). Stockholm: Norstedts, 1949. (Novel)
- Damen (The Lady). Stockholm: Norstedts, 1951. (Novel)
- Bikten (The Confession). Stockholm: Norstedts, 1954. (Short stories)
- Ta ner stjärnorna (Take Down the Stars). Stockholm: Norstedts, 1957. (Novel)
- Till minne (In Memory). Stockholm: Norstedts, 1959. (Four dialogues)
- Vårt nummer (Our Number). Svenska radiopjäser. Stockholm: Sveriges radio, 1959. (Radio play)
- Högmodet (Pride). Dödssynderna: Sju enaktare (The Deadly Sins: Seven One-Acters). By Per Edström et al. Stockholm: Bonniers, 1959. (Radio play)
- Möte i parken (Meeting in the Park). Svenska radiopjäser. Stockholm: Sveriges radio, 1962. (Radio play)
- Elis. Stockholm: Norstedts, 1964. (Novel)
