= For the Sake of My Intemperate Youth =

1952 film

- Film poster
- Directed by: Arne Mattsson
- Written by: Majken Cullborg; Rune Lindström
- Starring: Aino Taube
- Cinematography: Sven Thermænius
- Edited by: Carl-Olov Skeppstedt
- Release date: 17 December 1952
- Running time: 115 minutes
- Country: Sweden
- Language: Swedish

For the Sake of My Intemperate Youth (Swedish: För min heta ungdoms skull) is a 1952 Swedish drama film directed by Arne Mattsson. It was entered into the 1953 Cannes Film Festival.

== Cast ==
- Aino Taube - Greta Arvidsson
- Georg Rydeberg - Karl Arvidsson
- Nils Hallberg - Kuno Andersson
- Ulla-Bella Fridh - Maj (as Ulla-Britt Fridh)
- Ester Roeck-Hansen - Berit Altman
- Erik 'Bullen' Berglund - Altman (as Erik Berglund)
- Ib Schønberg - Madsen (as Ib Schönberg)
- Naima Wifstrand - Vendela Påhlman
- Margareta Fahlén - Elaine
- Ragnvi Lindbladh - Marianne (as Ragnvi Lindblad)
- Wiktor Andersson - School Janitor (as Kulörten Andersson)
- Else Jarlbak - Maid (as Elsie Jarlback)
- Hanny Schedin - Maj's Mother
- Birgitta Olzon - Maj's Schoolmate (as Birgitta Olsson)
- Axel Högel - Train Conductor
- Mats Björne - Jens
- Lars Egge - Dr. Knut Hegel
- Erik Hell - Blind Musician
- Maj-Britt Nilsson - Ingrid 'Ninni' Arvidsson
- Folke Sundquist - Torben Altman
