= Mannequin in Red =

- Film poster
- Directed by: Arne Mattsson
- Written by: Folke Mellvig (novel and screenplay), Lars Widding (writer)
- Produced by: Sandrews
- Starring: Karl-Arne Holmsten; Annalisa Ericson; Anita Björk; Lillebil Ibsen; Nils Hallberg
- Release date: 19 December 1958 (Sweden)
- Running time: 108 minutes
- Country: Sweden
- Language: Swedish

Mannequin in Red (Swedish: Mannekäng i rött) is a 1958 Swedish crime/thriller film directed by Arne Mattson and written by Folke Mellvig.

Starring film couple Karl-Arne Holmsten and Annalisa Ericson as the investigating detective couple John and Kajsa Hillman; this time investigating a murder of a model connected to a famous Stockholm fashion house, La Femme.

The film is the second film in director Arne Mattsson's Hillman-series of five thriller films, all containing a colour in the title: Damen i svart (1958), The Mannequin in Red (1958), Ryttare i blått (~ Rider in Blue) (1959), Lady in White (1962), and The Yellow Car (1963).
