= The Lady in White (film) =

1962 film

- Directed by: Arne Mattsson
- Written by: Folke Mellvig
- Produced by: Rune Waldekranz
- Starring: Nils Asther; Anita Björk; Karl-Arne Holmsten
- Cinematography: Hilding Bladh
- Edited by: Lennart Wallén
- Music by: Torbjörn Lundquist
- Production company: Sandrews
- Distributed by: Sandrew-Baumanfilm
- Release date: 2 July 1962
- Running time: 109 minutes
- Country: Sweden
- Language: Swedish

The Lady in White (Swedish: Vita frun) is a 1962 Swedish mystery thriller film directed by Arne Mattsson and starring Nils Asther, Anita Björk and Karl-Arne Holmsten. It was shot at the Råsunda Studios in Stockholm. The film's sets were designed by the art director Jan Boleslaw. It was the fourth in a series of five films featuring the husband and wife detective duo John and Kajsa Hillman. It was preceded in 1959 by Rider in Blue, the third film in the series.

== Cast ==
- Nils Asther as Simon Ek
- Anita Björk as Helen G:son Lundberg
- Jan Malmsjö as Roger von Schöffer
- Karl-Arne Holmsten as John Hillman
- Sif Ruud as Eivor Jansson
- Nils Hallberg as Freddy Sjöström
- Lena Granhagen as Sonja Svensson
- Elisabeth Odén as Agneta
- Tor Isedal as Torbjörn Strand
- Hjördis Petterson as Julia Rask
- Gio Petré as Eva von Schöffer
- Margit Carlqvist as Maria, Maid
- Britta Brunius as Selma Rask
- Elisabet Falk as Maud Bergstedt
- Olle Björklund as Rune Ahlgren
- Inger Bengtsson as Bus Driver
- Hugo Björne as Lawyer
- Tor Borong as Servant
- Curt Ericson as Policeman
- Mona Geijer-Falkner as Fru Andersson
- Curt Löwgren as Taxichaufför

== Bibliography ==
- Krawc, Alfred. International Directory of Cinematographers, Set- and Costume Designers in Film: Denmark, Finland, Norway, Sweden (from the beginnings to 1984). Saur, 1986.
- Qvist, Per Olov & von Bagh, Peter. Guide to the Cinema of Sweden and Finland. Greenwood Publishing Group, 2000.
