= Folke Sundquist =

Swedish actor

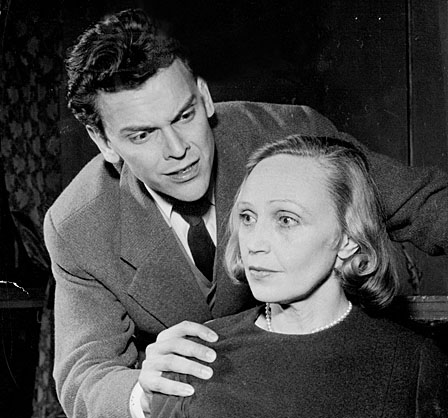
- Sundquist with Inga Tidblad in Kameliadamen, 1956.
- Born: 4 November 1925; Falun, Sweden
- Died: 13 January 2009 (aged 83); Malmö, Sweden
- Occupation: Actor
- Years active: 1932 – 1981

Folke Sundquist (4 November 1925 – 13 January 2009) was a Swedish film actor. He appeared in 21 films between 1951 and 1968. He starred part in the 1951 One Summer of Happiness (1951), which won the Golden Bear at the Berlin International Film Festival, and played a supporting role as one of the hitchhikers in Ingmar Bergman's Wild Strawberries (1957).

== Selected filmography ==
- One Summer of Happiness (1951)
- For the Sake of My Intemperate Youth (1952)
- Bread of Love (1953)
- Salka Valka (1954)
- Enchanted Walk (1954)
- Island of the Dead (1955)
- A Little Nest (1956)
- The Girl in Tails (1956)
- Wild Strawberries (1957)
- Spring of Life (1957)
- The Venetian (1958)
- Rabies (1958)
- Lovely Is the Summer Night (1961)
- Hour of the Wolf (1968)
