= Rune Waldekranz =

Swedish film producer (1911–2003)

- Born: 14 September 1911; Turinge, Sweden
- Died: 15 May 2003 (aged 91); Södertälje, Sweden
- Occupation: Film producer
- Years active: 1942-1964

Rune Waldekranz (14 September 1911 – 15 May 2003) was a Swedish film producer. He produced more than 50 films between 1942 and 1964. In 1969 at the 6th Guldbagge Awards, he won the award for Special Achievement.

== Selected filmography ==
- I Killed (1943)
- The Rose of Tistelön (1945)
- The Poetry of Ådalen (1947)
- Life in the Finnish Woods (1947)
- The Realm of the Rye (1950)
- Miss Julie (1951)
- Kalle Karlsson of Jularbo (1952)
- U-Boat 39 (1952)
- In Lilac Time (1952)
- She Came Like the Wind (1952)
- Sawdust and Tinsel (1953)
- All the World's Delights (1953)
- Barabbas (1953)
- Ursula, the Girl from the Finnish Forests (1953)
- The Road to Klockrike (1953)
- Karin Månsdotter (1954)
- Storm Over Tjurö (1954)
- Café Lunchrasten (1954)
- Our Father and the Gypsy (1954)
- Dreams (1955)
- The Girl in the Rain (1955)
- Moon Over Hellesta (1956)
- Night Child (1956)
- The Stranger from the Sky (1956)
- The Girl in Tails (1956)
- A Guest in His Own House (1957)
- Seventeen Years Old (1957)
- A Dreamer's Journey (1957)
- Synnöve Solbakken (1957)
- The Koster Waltz (1958)
- We at Väddö (1958)
- The Lady in Black (1958)
- Rider in Blue (1959)
- The Judge (1960)
- The Lady in White (1962)
- Loving Couples (1964)
