= Öllegård Wellton =

Swedish actress

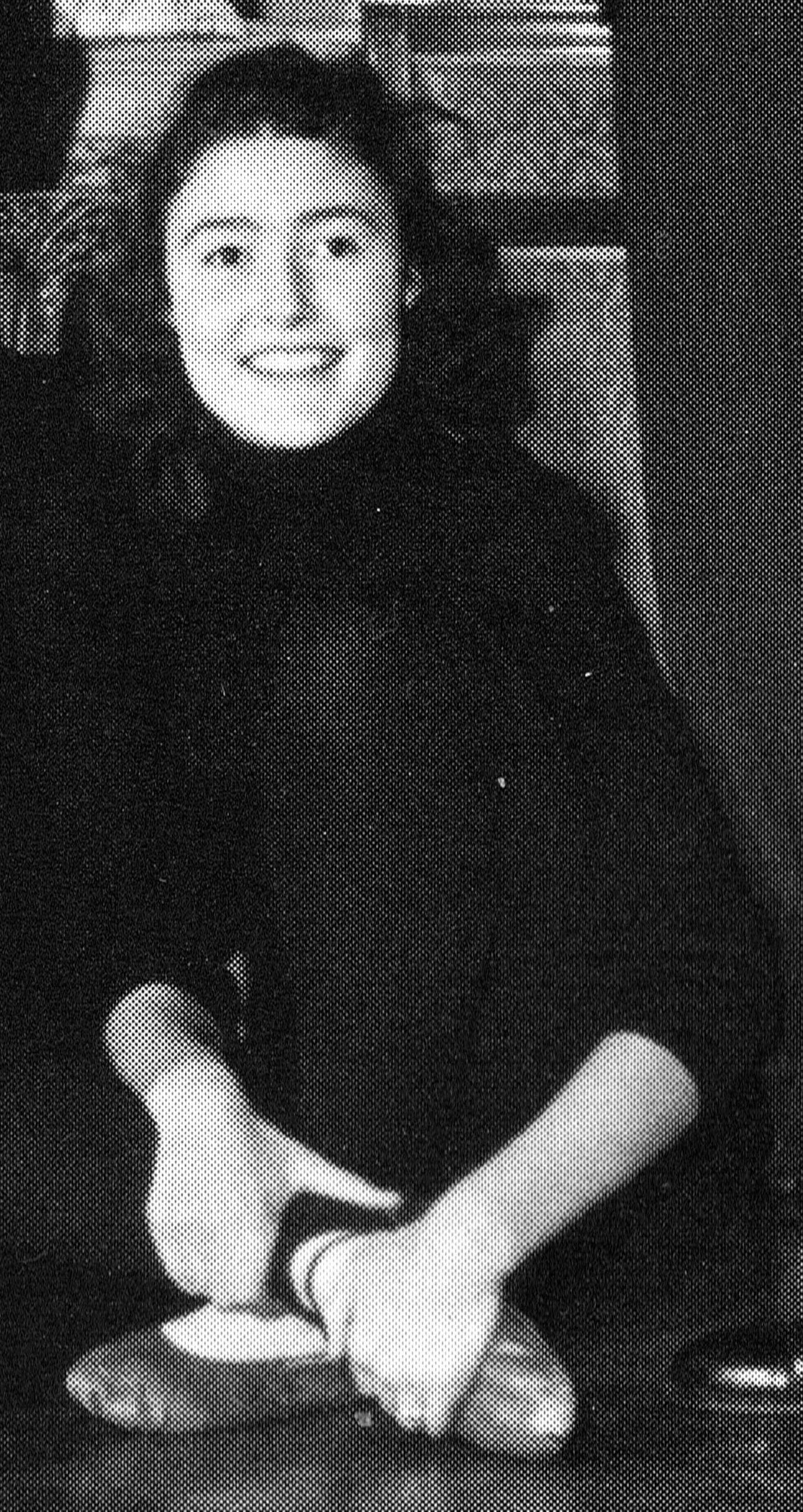
Late Öllegard Wellton Portrait

Ingeborg Viola Öllegård Wellton-Hell (née Wellton; 18 April 1932 – 26 June 1991) was a Swedish actress. She was married to actor Erik Hell from 1960 until his death in 1973.

She studied at the Royal Dramatic Training Academy from 1950–53 and was engaged at the Royal Dramatic Theatre until 1956. Thereafter she was engaged at many theatres, among them Östgötateatern and the National Swedish Touring Theatre. As a film actor she is well known as Tommy and Annika's mother in the 1969 TV series Pippi Longstocking.

== Selected filmography ==
- Hammarforsens brus (1948)
- Folket i fält (1953)
- A Night in the Archipelago (1953)
- Unmarried Mothers
- The Mistress (1962)
- I Am Curious (Yellow) (1967)
- Pippi Longstocking (1969–1973, TV and film)
- August Strindberg: ett liv (1985, TV)
