= The Phantom Carriage (1958 film) =

1958 film

- Directed by: Arne Mattsson
- Screenplay by: Rune Lindström
- Based on: Thy Soul Shall Bear Witness! 1912 novel by Selma Lagerlöf
- Starring: Edvin Adolphson
- Cinematography: Max Wilén
- Edited by: Carl-Olov Skeppstedt
- Music by: Dag Wirén
- Release date: 18 September 1958
- Running time: 109 minutes
- Country: Sweden
- Language: Swedish

The Phantom Carriage (Swedish: Körkarlen) is a 1958 Swedish horror film directed by Arne Mattsson. It was entered into the 9th Berlin International Film Festival. It is based on the 1912 Selma Lagerlöf novel Thy Soul Shall Bear Witness! and is a remake of the 1921 film.

== Cast ==
- Edvin Adolphson as Georges
- Anita Björk as Mrs. Holm
- Bengt Brunskog as Gustafson
- George Fant as David Holm
- Ulla Jacobsson as Edit
- Isa Quensel as Maria
