= Nils Hallberg =

Swedish actor

- Born: Nils Bertil Hallberg; 18 September 1921; Stockholm, Sweden
- Died: 8 October 2010 (aged 89); Stockholm
- Occupation: Actor
- Years active: 1934–1974

Nils Hallberg (18 September 1921 – 8 October 2010) was a Swedish actor. He appeared in 90 films between 1934 and 1974.

== Selected filmography ==
- Andersson's Kalle (1934)
- The Boys of Number Fifty Seven (1935)
- The Lady Becomes a Maid (1936)
- The Girls of Uppakra (1936)
- Poor Millionaires (1936)
- Happy Vestköping (1937)
- We at Solglantan (1939)
- In Darkest Smaland (1943)
- Imprisoned Women (1943)
- My People Are Not Yours (1944)
- We Need Each Other (1944)
- The People of Hemsö (1944)
- The Girls in Smaland (1945)
- Harald the Stalwart (1946)
- Brita in the Merchant's House (1946)
- Two Women (1947)
- Dynamite (1947)
- The People of Simlang Valley (1947)
- Maria (1947)
- Port of Call (1948)
- Private Bom (1948)
- Robinson in Roslagen (1948)
- Foreign Harbour (1948)
- Sunshine (1948)
- The Street (1949)
- Son of the Sea (1949)
- Two Stories Up (1950)
- One Summer of Happiness (1951)
- Customs Officer Bom (1951)
- In the Arms of the Sea (1951)
- For the Sake of My Intemperate Youth (1952)
- The Clang of the Pick (1952)
- Bom the Flyer (1952)
- Bread of Love (1953)
- The Beat of Wings in the Night (1953)
- Café Lunchrasten (1954)
- Storm Over Tjurö (1954)
- Enchanted Walk (1954)
- Time of Desire (1954)
- Young Summer (1954)
- Salka Valka (1954)
- A Night at Glimmingehus (1954)
- Men in the Dark (1955)
- The People of Hemsö (1955)
- A Little Nest (1956)
- Night Child (1956)
- Mother Takes a Vacation (1957)
- Bill Bergson Lives Dangerously (1957)
- The Lady in Black (1958)
- We at Väddö (1958)
- Rider in Blue (1959)
- Summer and Sinners (1960)
- The Lady in White (1962)
- Ticket to Paradise (1962)
- Sailors (1964)
- Här kommer bärsärkarna (1965)
