= Folke Mellvig =

Swedish writer and screenwriter

Karl Folke Sigvard Mellvig (23 May 1913 in Malmö, Sweden–4 September 1994 in Haninge Municipality, Stockholm County, Sweden) was a Swedish writer and screenwriter.

Mellvig was one of Sweden's most popular crime writers in the 1950s and 1960s, with murder mysteries set in "peaceful" Swedish summer time; at countryside locations and often in aristocratic or upper-class environments. His crime-solving middle-class city couple Kajsa and John Hillman (with their fumbling assistant Freddy) are famous, later on popular characters in the early Swedish thriller/crime films - the so-called "Hillman-thrillers", directed by Arne Mattsson (all with an effectful colour in the title). The most successful of these films were The Lady in Black and Mannequin in Red (both released in 1958). The first book on the Hillman-couple was published in 1951 (Uppdrag för Hillman/"A Mission For Hillman") and then several books followed on the couple but only a few selected were adapted to film.

Folke Mellvig was brother to the Swedish actor Börje Mellvig.

== Selected bibliography ==
- 1972 - Gengångaren ("The Ghost")
- 1969 - Målarn och de tre andra ("The Painter and the Three Others") (youth crime)
- 1967 - Briljantarmbandet ("The Crystal Bracelet")
- 1966 - 13
- 1963 - Den gula bilen ("The Yellow Car")
- 1963 - Vita frun ("The Lady in White")
- 1962 - Lyckta dörrar ("Locked Doors")
- 1961 - Brott i paradiset ("Crime In Paradise")
- 1960 - Ryttare i blått ("Rider In Blue")
- 1959 - Sist till kvarn ("Last One Up")
- 1959 - Mannekäng i rött ("Mannequin in Red")
- 1959 - Damen i svart ("The Lady in Black")
- 1958 - Farligt för familjen ("Dangerous For Family")
- 1957 - Mord igen kapten Hillman ("Murder Again Captain Hillman")
- 1956 - De tre ingenjörerna ("The Three Engineers")
- 1956 - Hillman och kavaljeren
- 1955 - Att skugga en man
- 1955 - Mord på halsen
- 1954 - Dags för död ("Time For Death")
- 1954 - Guldlock och björnarna
- 1953 - Sent besök hos Hillman ("Late Night Visit At Hillman's")
- 1953 - Döden spelar upp ("Showtime For Death")
- 1953 - Ett, tu, tre ("One, Two, Three")
- 1952 - Stjärnfall ("Falling Stars")
- 1951 - Uppdrag för Hillman ("Mission For Hillman")
- 1948 - Gäst i byn ("Village Guest") (non-crime)
- 1942 - Genom spärren

== Screenplays ==
- 1970 - Sonja
- 1967 – Kullamannen
- Den gula bilen (1963)
- Vita frun (1962)
- Ryttare i blått (1959)
- Brott i Paradiset (1959)
- Mannekäng i rött (1958)
- The Lady in Black (1958)
- Crime in Paradise (1959)
