= Ann and Eve =

1970 film

- Theatrical release poster
- Directed by: Arne Mattsson
- Written by: Ernest Hotch
- Produced by: Lennart Berns; Bert Sundberg (executive producer)
- Starring: Gio Petré; Marie Liljedahl; Francisco Rabal
- Cinematography: Max Wilén
- Edited by: Wic Kjellin
- Music by: Bengt-Arne Wallin
- Production companies: Jadran Film; Omega Film
- Distributed by: Chevron Pictures (US); Astral Films (Canada); Pallas Film (Sweden)
- Release date: August 3, 1970
- Running time: 89 minutes
- Countries: Sweden; Yugoslavia
- Language: Swedish
- Box office: $18,000,000

Ann and Eve (Swedish: Ann och Eve - de erotiska, lit. 'Ann and Eve - the erotic ones') is a 1970 Swedish-Yugoslav erotic drama film directed by Arne Mattsson and starring Gio Petré and Marie Liljedahl as the title characters. The film also stars Francisco Rabal.

== Plot ==
An erotic drama about a youthful bride-to-be who takes a holiday to Yugoslavia with a cynical and evil lesbian film critic (and murderess) that leads to debauchery, degradation with a dwarf, a dinner with naked entertainers and other highlights.

== Reception ==
Ann and Eve was a major commercial success. Released in the United States on August 3, 1970, the film grossed $18 million at the North American box office, making it the 17th highest-grossing film of 1970.

== See also ==
- Cinema of Sweden
- Erotic film
