= Rider in Blue =

1959 film

- Directed by: Arne Mattsson
- Written by: Folke Mellvig; Lars Widding
- Produced by: Rune Waldekranz
- Starring: Annalisa Ericson; Gunnel Broström; Bengt Brunskog
- Cinematography: Hilding Bladh
- Edited by: Lennart Wallén
- Music by: Torbjörn Lundquist
- Production company: Sandrews
- Distributed by: Sandrew-Baumanfilm
- Release date: 16 October 1959
- Running time: 110 minutes
- Country: Sweden
- Language: Swedish

Rider in Blue (Swedish: Ryttare i blått) is a 1959 Swedish mystery thriller film directed by Arne Mattsson and starring Annalisa Ericson, Gunnel Broström and Bengt Brunskog. It was shot at the Centrumateljéerna Studios in Stockholm and on location at Bromma Airport and Strömsholm Castle. The film's sets were designed by the art director Bibi Lindström. It was the third in a series of five films featuring the husband and wife detective duo John and Kajsa Hillman. It was followed in 1962 by The Lady in White, the fourth film in the series.

== Cast ==
- Annalisa Ericson as Kajsa Hillman
- Gunnel Broström as Elly Weinestam
- Bengt Brunskog as Douglas Weinestam
- Gio Petré as Git Malmström
- Björn Bjelfvenstam as Henrik Löwe
- Mona Malm as Kerstin Renman
- Erik Hell as Kurt Forsberg
- Lena Granhagen as Sonja Svensson
- Nils Hallberg as Freddy Sjöström
- Karl-Arne Holmsten as John Hillman
- Lauritz Falk as Axel Weber
- Kotti Chave as Sune Öhrgren
- Tommy Nilson as Andersson
- Lennart Lindberg as Nelson
- Karl Erik Flens as Jonsson
- Olle Grönstedt as Battalion Veterinary
- Curt Löwgren as Parat
- John Melin as Åberg
- Bengt Gillberg as Palm
- Olof Huddén as Rutger von Schöffer
- Inger Liljefors as Eva
- Gunilla Nachmanson as Blue Star
- Brita Ponsbach as Blue Star
- Pia Rydvall as Blue Star
- Eva-Britt Johnson as Blue Star
- Björn Gustafson as Boman, Constable
- Gerd Hystad as Air Hostess
- Ellika Mann as Veterinarian's Wife
- Bellan Roos as Vivianne, Waitress
- Hanny Schedin as Cook
- Solveig Ternström as Housemaid at Ribersvik
- Sigvard Törnqvist as Captain
- Sven Wollter as Press Photographer
- Birger Åsander as Taxi Driver

== Bibliography ==
- Cowie, Peter Françoise Buquet, Risto Pitkänen & Godfried Talboom. Scandinavian Cinema: A Survey of the Films and Film-makers of Denmark, Finland, Iceland, Norway, and Sweden. Tantivy Press, 1992.
- Krawc, Alfred. International Directory of Cinematographers, Set- and Costume Designers in Film: Denmark, Finland, Norway, Sweden (from the beginnings to 1984). Saur, 1986.
