= Lars Widding =

Swedish author and journalist

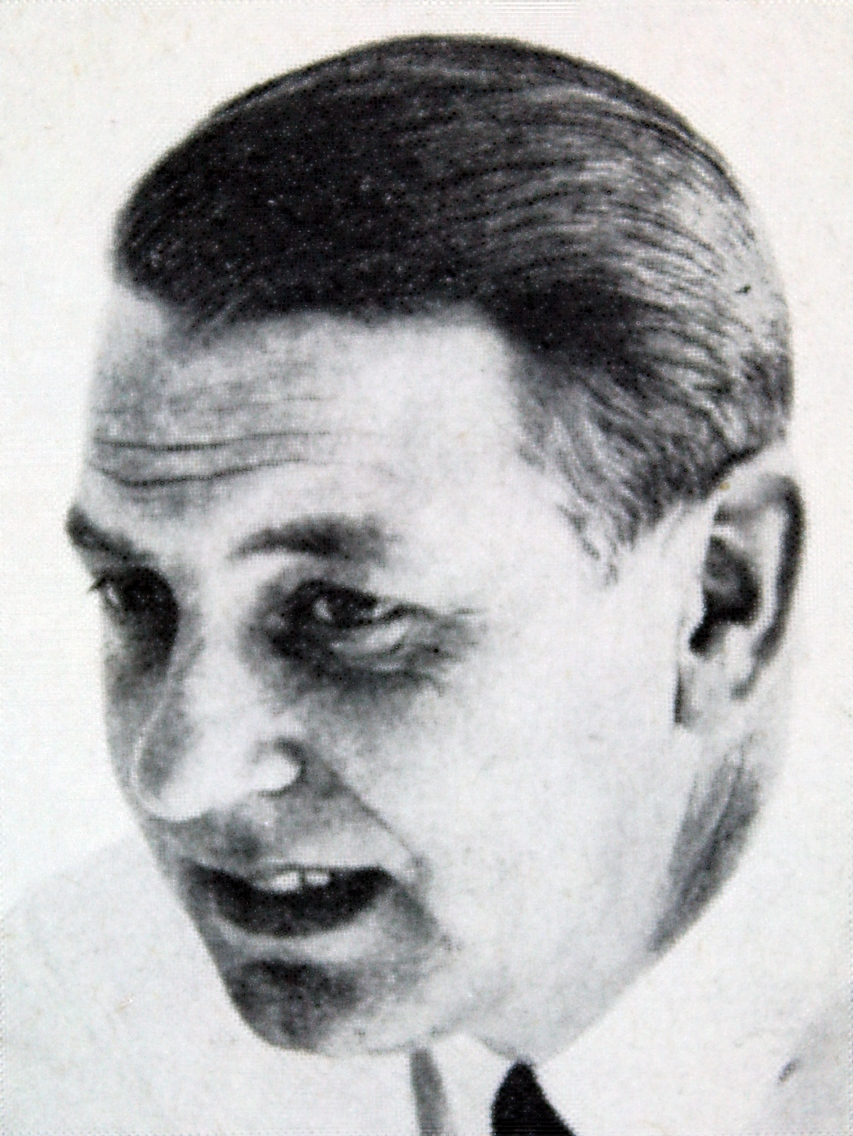
Lars Widding

Lars Widding, born 31 October 1924 in Umeå, Västerbotten, died 3 March 1994, was a Swedish author and journalist, best known for his historic novels. He worked for Expressen from 1950 to 1985. Widding was one of the most read authors of the 20th century in Sweden.
