= Adventures of Nils Holgersson =

1962 film

- Directed by: Kenne Fant
- Screenplay by: Tage Aurell; Kathrine Aurell
- Based on: The Wonderful Adventures of Nils by Selma Lagerlöf
- Produced by: Kenne Fant
- Starring: Sven Lundberg; Max von Sydow; Annika Tretow
- Cinematography: Max Wilén
- Edited by: Carl-Olov Skeppstedt
- Music by: Torbjörn Lundquist
- Release date: 12 September 1962 (Sweden)
- Running time: 98 minutes
- Country: Sweden
- Language: Swedish

Adventures of Nils Holgersson (Swedish: Nils Holgerssons underbara resa) is a 1962 Swedish film directed by Kenne Fant and is based on the novel The Wonderful Adventures of Nils by Selma Lagerlöf. It was entered into the 3rd Moscow International Film Festival.

== Cast ==
- Sven Lundberg as Nils Holgersson
- Max von Sydow as The Father
- Annika Tretow as The Mother
- Jarl Kulle as Mårten Gåskarl (voice)
- Naima Wifstrand as Mother Akka (voice)
- Georg Funkquist as Gorgo (voice)
- Olof Sandborg as Bataki (voice)
- Toivo Pawlo as Smirre Fox (voice)
- Christina Schollin as Office Girl
- Gustaf VI Adolf as himself
