= One Summer of Happiness =

1951 film

- Hon dansade en sommar
- Directed by: Arne Mattsson
- Screenplay by: Volodja Semitjov; Olle Hellbom
- Based on: Sommardansen by Per Olof Ekström
- Produced by: Lennart Landheim
- Starring: Ulla Jacobsson; Folke Sundquist; Edvin Adolphson; John Elfström
- Cinematography: Göran Strindberg
- Edited by: Lennart Wallén
- Music by: Sven Sköld
- Production company: Nordisk Tonefilm
- Distributed by: Nordisk Tonefilm
- Release date: 17 December 1951 (Sweden)
- Running time: 103 minutes
- Country: Sweden
- Language: Swedish

One Summer of Happiness (Swedish: Hon dansade en sommar, lit. 'She danced one summer') is a 1951 Swedish film by director Arne Mattsson, based on the 1949 novel Sommardansen (The summer dance) by Per Olof Ekström. It was the first Swedish film to win the Golden Bear at the Berlin International Film Festival. It was also nominated for the Palme d'Or at the 1952 Cannes Film Festival. Today, the film is mainly known for its nude scenes, which caused much controversy at the time and, together with Ingmar Bergman's Summer with Monika (1953), spread the image of Swedish "free love" around the world.

== Plot ==
The film tells the story about the university student Göran who spends a summer on his uncle's farm, where he meets the young Kerstin. They instantly fall in love, but Kerstin is ruled by very strict relatives, so they must hide their love story from everyone, not the least from the extremely strict vicar. They experience an intense summer together, and Göran dreads the idea of returning to university in the autumn. A twist of fate changes their lives forever.

== Cast ==
- Ulla Jacobsson as Kerstin
- Folke Sundquist as Göran
- Edvin Adolphson as Anders Persson
- Irma Christenson as Sigrid
- John Elfström as The Vicar
- Nils Hallberg as Nisse
- Gunvor Pontén as Sylvia
- Berta Hall as Anna
- Axel Högel as Kerstin's Grandfather

== Reception ==
The film caused much international controversy, because of a nude swimming sequence and a love scene which included a close-up of Ulla Jacobsson's breasts, but also because of its very anti-clerical message by portraying a local priest as the main villain. So, in spite of its awards, the film was banned in Spain and several other countries, and was not widely released in the United States until 1955, although it was showing in San Francisco as early as October 1953.

== Awards ==
Won

- 2nd Berlin International Film Festival - Golden Bear
- 1952 Cannes Film Festival - Best Music.

Nominated

- 1952 Cannes Film Festival - Palme d'Or

== See also ==
- Nudity in film
