= Nordisk Tonefilm =

Swedish film company

Nordisk Tonefilm (Danish for 'Nordic sound film') was a Swedish film production company founded in 1930 as a subsidiary of the Danish film production company Nordisk Film. The company's most famous film was One Summer of Happiness (1951). In early 1941, the company sought permission to distribute Veit Harlan's antisemitic Nazi propaganda film, Jud Süß in Sweden but it was banned by the censor. Production mainly took place at the Kungsholmen Studios in Stockholm.

The company's finances deteriorated in the late 1960s and the company was sold in 1969 to Omega Film AB, which moved into Apelbergsgatan 58. Omega Film AB canceled its payments on April 2, 1971 and was declared bankrupt on September 19, 1972. Tonefilm, which was a subsidiary of Omega Film, left Apelbergsgatan in 1974–1975.

The successor company Nya Svenska AB Nordisk Tonefilm was formed by Ingemar Ejve in June 1973. The first recording was Maria directed by Mats Arehn. The company changed its name to Nordisk Tonefilm AB in September 1976. In 1984, Ingemar Ejve ran his business together with William Aldridge, Björn Henricson and Lennart Norbäck. Nordisk Tonefilm and Ingemar Ejve were producers for Mio in the Land of Faraway (1987), a difficult-to-master co-production between Sweden, Norway and the Soviet Union. The film became the most expensive to date in Swedish film history. Nordisk Tonefilm AB changed its name to Gamma-film Aktiebolag in January 1989. Thus, the business ceased.
