= Björn Berglund =

Swedish actor (1904–1968)

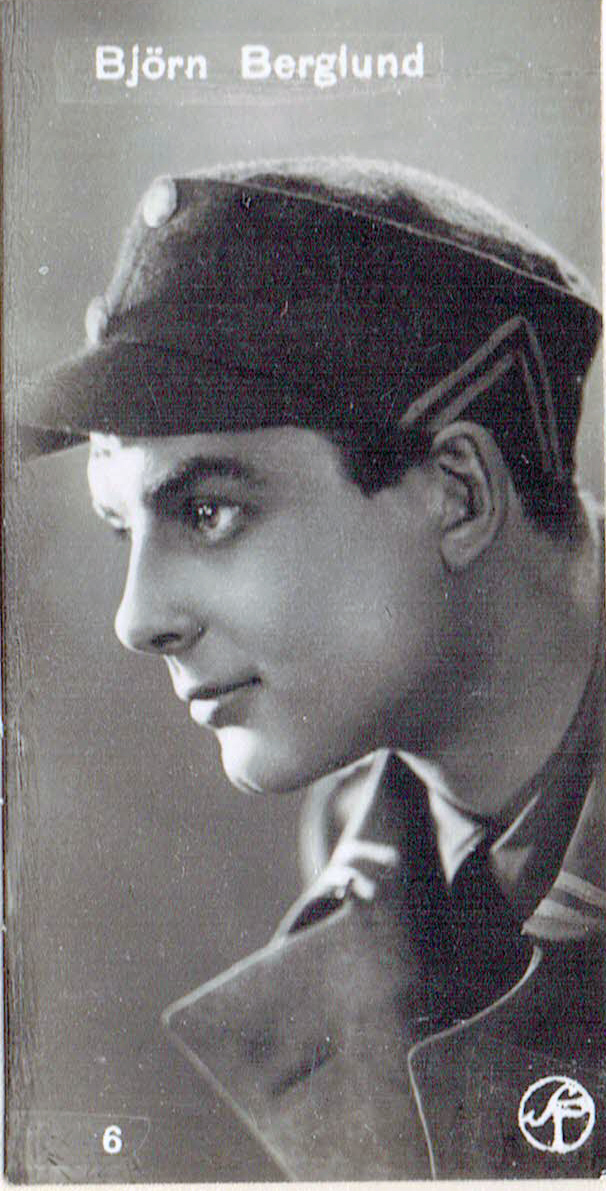
- Björn Berglund
- Born: 16 October 1904; Jörn
- Died: 3 August 1968 (aged 63)
- Occupation: Actor
- Spouse(s): Lisskulla Jobs

Björn Berglund (16 October 1904 – 3 August 1968) was a Swedish stage and film and television actor.

== Biography ==
Björn Nils Johan Gustaf Berglund was born in Jörn, Västerbotten County. He began his career in cinema in the 1939 Edvin Adolphson-directed musical film Säg det i toner (English release title: The Dream Waltz) starring Håkan Westergren and Stina Berg. His career would span nearly four decades and he would appear in over seventy-five films. He died in Sweden at 1968 at age 63.

== Selected filmography ==
- Say It with Music (1929)
- One Night (1931)
- The Southsiders (1932)
- His Life's Match (1932)
- Fridolf in the Lion's Den (1933)
- Saturday Nights (1933)
- Andersson's Kalle (1934)
- Swedenhielms (1935)
- Shipwrecked Max (1936)
- Johan Ulfstjerna (1936)
- The Andersson Family (1937)
- Conflict (1937)
- Baldwin's Wedding (1938)
- Storm Over the Skerries (1938)
- Emilie Högquist (1939)
- Bashful Anton (1940)
- Woman on Board (1941)
- The Heavenly Play (1942)
- Sun Over Klara (1942)
- Tomorrow's Melody (1942)
- Life and Death (1943)
- Kungajakt (1944)
- My People Are Not Yours (1944)
- Motherhood (1945)
- Number 17 (1949)
- The Street (1949)
- Vagabond Blacksmiths (1949)
- Two Stories Up (1950)
- The Saucepan Journey (1950)
- Dangerous Spring (1949)
- Poker (1951)
- In Lilac Time (1952)
- Encounter with Life (1952)
- Defiance (1952)
- House of Women (1953)
- Ursula, the Girl from the Finnish Forests (1953)
- Bill Bergson and the White Rose Rescue (1953)
- Luffaren och Rasmus (1955)
- Voyage in the Night (1955)
- Ön (1956)
- Stage Entrance (1956)
- Night Child (1956)
- The Minister of Uddarbo (1957)
- Vägen genom Skå (1957)
- Three Men in Search of a Troll (1967)

== Bibliography ==
- Wright, Rochelle. The Visible Wall: Jews and Other Ethnic Outsiders in Swedish Film. SIU Press, 1998.
