= His English Wife =

1927 film

- Directed by: Gustaf Molander
- Written by: Paul Merzbach
- Produced by: Oscar Hemberg
- Starring: Lil Dagover; Gösta Ekman; Karin Swanström
- Cinematography: Åke Dahlqvist; Julius Jaenzon
- Production companies: AB Isepa; Wengeroff-Film
- Distributed by: Svenska Biografteaterns Filmbyrå
- Release date: 17 January 1927
- Running time: 150 minutes
- Countries: Germany; Sweden
- Languages: Silent; Swedish intertitles

His English Wife (German: Die Lady ohne Schleier, Swedish: Hans engelska fru) is a 1927 German-Swedish silent drama film directed by Gustaf Molander and starring Lil Dagover, Gösta Ekman and Karin Swanström. It was shot at the Råsunda Studios in Stockholm. The film's sets were designed by the art director Vilhelm Bryde.

== Cast ==
- Lil Dagover as Cathleen Paget, née Brock
- Gösta Ekman as Ivor Willington
- Karin Swanström as Mrs. Brock, Cathleen's mother
- Håkan Westergren as Bruce Brock
- Brita Appelgren as Poppy Brock
- Stina Berg as Antje
- Margit Manstad as Faucigny
- Vilhelm Bryde as Lionel Jessop
- Carl-Gunnar Wingård as Waiter
- Eric Gustafson
- Josua Bengtson as Train announcer
- Ragnar Arvedson as Artist
- Olga Andersson as London lady
- Margit Rosengren as Lilian
- Urho Somersalmi as Birger Holm, landowner

== Bibliography ==
- Daniel Donoghue. Lady Godiva: A Literary History of the Legend. John Wiley & Sons, 2008.
