= Dangerous Paradise =

Dangerous Paradise may refer to:

- Dangerous Paradise (1930 film), an American Pre-Code drama film
- Dangerous Paradise (1931 film), a Swedish drama film
- The Dangerous Paradise, a 1920 American silent comedy film
