= Meg Westergren =

Swedish actress (born 1932)

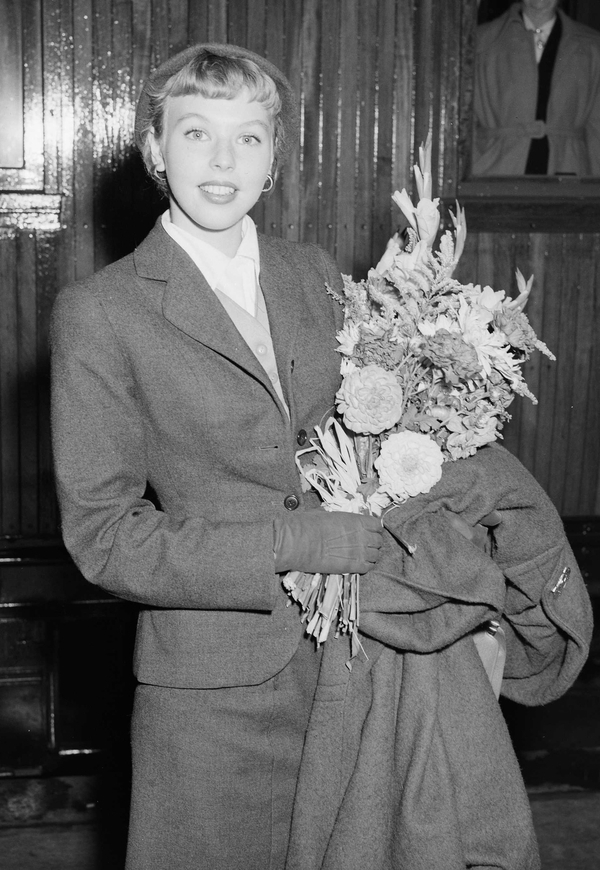
- Meg Westergren in Oslo, 1951
- Born: Elsa Margareta Westergren; 16 May 1932 (age 93); Stockholm, Sweden
- Occupation: Actress
- Years active: 1951–present
- Spouse(s): Tore Wretman (m. 1953–1971) Carl Magnus Nyström (m. 1989)
- Children: Fredrik Wretman; Malin Wretman Krüll
- Parent(s): Håkan Westergren; Inga Tidblad

Elsa Margareta "Meg" Westergren (born 16 May 1932) is a Swedish actress from Nockeby, Bromma, in Stockholm. Her parents were both actors and she made her acting debut in the 1951 film Living on 'Hope'. She studied at the Royal Dramatic Training Academy from 1951 to 1954, and became a successful comedic theater actress afterwards. Westergren has been married twice and has one son.

== Early life ==
Westergren is the daughter of famous actors Håkan Westergren and Inga Tidblad. They moved to Nockeby, Stockholm, in 1931 and got married the same year. Westergren was born the following year on 16 May 1932. As a child, Westergren was a big admirer of her mother who was one of the biggest stars in Swedish theater. Westergren was raised with a nanny and has later said she wishes her busy parents would have spent more time with her while growing up.

Westergren was originally not planning on becoming an actress. Instead she had decided to become a fashion designer and traveled to Paris to study. In between lessons at the designer institute, she walked the runway as a model at the fashion house Carven.

== Career in acting ==
=== Early career and education ===
While living in Paris, Westergren received a call from Swedish director Göran Gentele, who offered her a role in his 1951 comedy film Leva på 'Hoppet'. She accepted the offer to appear in the film, which also starred a number of other relatively unknown actors at the time, including Ingrid Thulin, Per Oscarsson, Gunvor Pontén, and Jarl Kulle. Westergren returned to Sweden to shoot Leva på 'Hoppet', which became her acting debut. The film sparked her interest in acting, and when she decided to study again she sent in applications to both the fashion university college Beckmans designhögskola and the Royal Dramatic Training Academy. The auditions for the Royal Dramatic Training Academy were held earlier than those for Beckmans designhögskola, and Westergren was admitted to the school after only one audition.

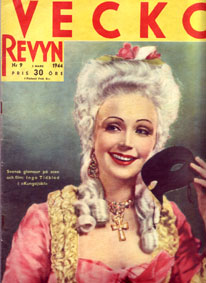
Inga Tidblad, Westergren's mother, in 1945

Westergren studied at the Royal Dramatic Training Academy from 1951 to 1954. She did not like the experience, stating that "nothing was enjoyable". Westergren has commented on her time there: "My mother wanted to give me advice, wanted to come and see everything I did. I did not want that. It was tough. At the school I always felt pressured to deliver good performances, and what I did when I went there never turned out really good." Westergren revealed in a 2009 television interview that she felt she could not really deliver as an actress until after her mother's death in 1975.

=== Later career ===
After graduating, Westergren was offered a job at Alléteatern (English: The Avenue Theater) by actor and director Sture Lagerwall. Feeling it would be more enjoyable than her time at the school, she accepted. Westergren has been a successful comedic actress at various theaters ever since, although she has played some more serious roles too. Her mother's roles were more dramatic, and she has said that she chose the comedic roles to create her own niche.

After Alléteatern she proceeded to work at Vasateatern, where she earned big success in 1956 with Vad vet mamma om kärlek? (English: What does mother know about love?). While working at these two places, Westergren also played roles at the following private theaters in Stockholm: Intiman, Maxim, Södra Teatern, Folkan, Chinateatern, and Oscarsteatern. She was at one point offered to appear in a play on the national Royal Dramatic Theatre. The offer came from Lasse Pöystis, the theater's supervisor, but he lost his job two days later before they had made a deal.

In addition to theater, Westergren has played roles in films and on television. Her comedic roles in the films Fröken Chic (1959) and Lille Fridolf blir morfar (1957) are among her most appreciated works. Westergren's roles have become more mature and less comedic as the years have gone by. She played a controlling wife in the television series Goda grannar (1987) and a dramatic secretary in the soap opera Rederiet (1994–1995).

In the 2000s, Westergren has toured Sweden with her show Mitt teaterliv (English: My theater life), in which she talks about her career and her famous parents. The "Carl Åkermarks stipendium" scholarship was given to Westergren in 1992 by the Swedish Academy. In 2009–2010, she was one of the participants in the popular biographical television series Stjärnorna på slottet that airs on Sveriges Television.

== Personal life ==
Westergren met her first husband, Tore Wretman, in the 1950s. They had a son together, Fredrik Wretman, who has become a well-known artist. They also had a daughter who died of a brain tumor. The couple separated after 16 years. Westergren is currently residing in Nockeby and Båstad with her new husband Carl Magnus Nyström. She likes the fact that Nyström knew nothing about her and her parents when they first met. For thirty years they have lived in the same house in Nockeby that Westergren grew up in. During that time she has become a grandmother of five children.
