= Albiin =

Albiin is a surname. Notable people with the surname include:

- Elsie Albiin (1921–2009), Swedish actress
- Emmy Albiin (1873–1959), Swedish actress
