= Inga Tidblad =

Swedish actress (1901–1975)

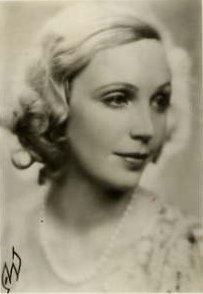
- Tidblad in the 1930s
- Born: Inga Sofia Tidblad; 29 May 1901; Stockholm, Sweden
- Died: 12 September 1975 (aged 74); Stockholm, Sweden
- Occupation: Actress
- Years active: 1921–1974
- Spouses: Ragnar Billberg (m. 1923; died 1930) Håkan Westergren (m. 1931)
- Children: 3, including Meg Westergren

Inga Sofia Tidblad (29 May 1901 – 12 September 1975) was a Swedish actress. She was one of the most praised actresses in Swedish theatre.

== Biography ==
Tidblad was born in Stockholm to engineer Otto Tidblad and this wife, Helga (ne Krumlinde). She studied at the Royal Dramatic Theatre's famous acting school, the Royal Dramatic Training Academy (1919–22), where she was already recognized as a rising star by audience and critics for her debut performance of Ariel in Shakespeare's The Tempest, where director Olof Molander had hand-picked her for the part, recognizing her talent early. After her graduation from drama school she worked at the Swedish Theatre, where she had her big star breakthrough in Sweden as Ophelia in Hamlet, opposite Schanke in the title role, in 1924. She remained in the theatre's ensemble until its tragic burn-down in 1925.

Most notable for her many female leads in Shakespeare and Strindberg plays, star performances by Tidblad on stage include her Ophelia in Shakespeare's Hamlet, Billie Moore in Broadway, the Angel in Cenodoxus, Aude in Graven under triumfbågen, Anna Boleyn in Henry VIII, Juliet in Shakespeare's Romeo and Juliet, Ellen in Älskling jag ger mig, Rosalind in Shakespeare's As You Like It, Lotta Enterfelt in Svenska sprätthöken, Alegre in Maxwell Anderson's play Key Largo (1940), Sonja in Crime and Punishment, Blanche in Folkungasagan, Portia in Shakespeare's Julius Caesar, Mary Vetsera in Mayerlingdramat, Cecilia in Rovdjuret, The Daughter in Strindberg's The Ghost Sonata, Mrs. Kenyon in Samson Raphaelson's play Skylark (1943), Beréngère in Robert Boissy's Jupiter (1943), Marguerite Gautier in Alexandre Dumas' The Lady of the Camellias (1954), Mary Tyrone in the world premiere of Eugene O'Neill's Long Day's Journey Into Night (1956), in Terence Rattigan's Separate Tables at Vasateatern (1958–59) and as Queen Christina in August Strindberg's play Kristina in 1961.

During her career Tidblad performed at Sweden's prime theatres; after her work at the Swedish Theatre she worked at the Vasateatern (1925–26), the Oscarsteatern (1926–32) and at the Royal Dramatic Theatre from 1932 to 1963 when she retired from stage. After her retirement she made only a few guest appearances on stage and film.

She starred in some notable early Swedish silent films, including Norrtullsligan (1923), Mälarpirater (1923), Farbror Frans (1926) and Svarte Rudolf (1928). She made her film debut in Andersson, Pettersson och Lundström in 1923. In 1930 she starred in the lead, opposite Gösta Ekman, in the first Swedish talkie; For Her Sake. Notable performances on film include Norrtullsligan (1923), Sången om den eldröda blomman (1934), Intermezzo (the original Swedish 1936 film), Flames in the Dark (1942), Det brinner en eld (1943), Den osynliga muren (1944), Frånskild aka Divorced (1951; directed by Gustaf Molander and written by Ingmar Bergman), Kvinnohuset (1953), Enhörningen (1955), Pärlemor (1961); and Pistolen (1973), for which Tidblad was awarded a Guldbagge Award (the finest Swedish film award, the Golden Beetle) for Best Actress, shortly before her death.

She was also the voice of Pinocchio in the Swedish dubbing of Walt Disney's film Pinocchio (1940) and also guest-starred in an episode of the early American TV series Foreign Intrigue in 1956. Was awarded the Eugene O'Neill Award in 1956 and a Guldbagge Award for Best Actress in 1974 for her role in Pistol.

=== Personal life ===
She was married first to actor Ragnar Billberg (1923–1930) and then to actor Håkan Westergren from 1931 (to her death in 1975), with whom she had daughter Meg Westergren and son Claes-Håkan Westergren, also actors.

== Selected filmography ==
- Andersson, Pettersson och Lundström (1923)
- Mälarpirater (1923)
- Norrtullsligan (1923)
- The Counts at Svansta (1924)
- Ödets man (1924)
- Uncle Frans (1926)
- Black Rudolf (1928)
- For Her Sake (1930)
- Longing for the Sea (1931)
- People of Hälsingland (1933)
- Hon eller ingen (1934)
- Sången om den eldröda blomman (1934)
- Intermezzo (1936)
- Janssons frestelse (1938)
- Flames in the Dark (1942)
- There's a Fire Burning (1943)
- The Invisible Wall (1944)
- Kungajakt (1944)
- The Gallows Man (1945)
- Frånskild (aka Divorced) (1951)
- House of Women (1953)
- Gabrielle (1954)
- The Unicorn (1955)
- Foreign Intrigue (1956)
- Pärlemor (1961)
- Ateljé Mia (1965)
- Glasmenageriet (The Glass Menagerie), TV theatre (1967)
- Drottningens juvelsmycke, mini series (1967)
- Pistolen (1973)
- Gangsterfilmen (1974)
