= Crime and Punishment (1945 film) =

1945 film

- Directed by: Hampe Faustman
- Written by: Bertil Malmberg; Sven Stolpe
- Based on: Crime and Punishment; 1866 novel by Fyodor Dostoevsky
- Produced by: Lorens Marmstedt
- Starring: Hampe Faustman; Gunn Wållgren; Sigurd Wallén; Elsie Albiin
- Cinematography: Göran Strindberg
- Edited by: Lennart Wallén
- Music by: Erik Nordgren
- Production company: Terrafilm
- Distributed by: Terrafilm
- Release date: 16 October 1945
- Running time: 106 minutes
- Country: Sweden
- Language: Swedish

Crime and Punishment (Swedish: Brott och straff) is a 1945 Swedish drama film directed by Hampe Faustman and starring Faustman, Gunn Wållgren, Sigurd Wallén and Elsie Albiin. It was shot at the Centrumateljéerna Studios in Stockholm. The film's sets were designed by the art director Harald Garmland. It is an adaptation of the 1866 novel Crime and Punishment by Fyodor Dostoevsky.

== Cast ==
- Hampe Faustman as Raskolnikov
- Gunn Wållgren as Sonja
- Sigurd Wallén as Samiotov
- Elsie Albiin as Dunja
- Georg Funkquist as Lusjin
- Tekla Sjöblom as Modern
- Toivo Pawlo as Rasumikin
- Elsa Widborg as Aljona
- Hugo Björne as Marmeladov
- Lisskulla Jobs as Katarina
- Harriett Philipson as Natascha
- Bengt Ekerot as Studenten
- Magnus Kesster as Polisofficeren
- Josua Bengtson as Constable

== Bibliography ==
- Sundholm, John; Thorsen, Isak; Andersson, Lars Gustaf (2012-09-20). Historical Dictionary of Scandinavian Cinema. Scarecrow Press, Bloomsbury Publishing PLC. ISBN 978-0-8108-5524-3.
