= A Handful of Love =

A Handful of Love may refer to:

- A Handful of Love (TV series), a 2004 TVB TV series
- A Handful of Love (film), a 1974 Swedish period drama film
