= The Bells of the Old Town =

1946 film

- Directed by: Ragnar Hyltén-Cavallius
- Written by: Ragnar Hyltén-Cavallius; Bertil Malmberg
- Produced by: Olle Brunaeus
- Starring: Edvard Persson; George Fant; Elsie Albiin
- Cinematography: James B. Shackelford
- Music by: Alvar Kraft
- Production company: Europa Film
- Distributed by: Europa Film
- Release date: 30 December 1946
- Running time: 112 minutes
- Country: Sweden
- Language: Swedish

The Bells of the Old Town (Swedish: Klockorna i Gamla sta'n) is a 1946 Swedish drama film directed by Ragnar Hyltén-Cavallius and starring Edvard Persson, George Fant and Elsie Albiin. It was shot at the Sundbyberg Studios of Europa Film in Stockholm. The film's sets were designed by the art director Max Linder. It was the first Swedish feature film to be shot in colour, using the Cinecolor process.

== Synopsis ==
Carl Magnus Berg is a kind-hearted bailiff operating in the Old Town of Stockholm. He takes pity on a struggling jazz musician and his girlfriend Karin.

== Cast ==
- Edvard Persson as Carl Magnus Berg
- George Fant as Bengt Florin
- Elsie Albiin as Karin
- Gunnel Broström as Harriet von Borch
- Gösta Cederlund as Johan Fredrik Morén
- Torsten Hillberg as Chief bailiff
- Axel Högel as Fager
- John Norrman as Efraim Nilsson
- Aurore Palmgren as Mrs. Karlsson
- Ulla Wikander as Irma
- Harry Ahlin as Jochum
- Gösta Gustafson as Smygen Eriksson
- Åke Jensen as Ebbe
- Jarl Hamilton as Claes
- Greta Liming as Anne-Grethe
- Ebba Wrede as Flapper #1
- Marie-Louise Martins as Flapper #2
- Elsa Ebbesen as Mrs. Nilsson
- Olga Appellöf as Hildur Larsson
- Gabriel Alw as Debt Collector
- Wiktor Andersson as Distrainor
- Erland Colliander as Distrainor
- Hartwig Fock as Distrainor
- Georg Fernqvist as Janitor
- Robert Ryberg as Maître d'
- Ingvar Kjellson as Guest at the Party

== Bibliography ==
- Qvist, Per Olov & von Bagh, Peter. Guide to the Cinema of Sweden and Finland. Greenwood Publishing Group, 2000.
- Sundholm, John. Historical Dictionary of Scandinavian Cinema. Scarecrow Press, 2012.
