= Gösta Gustafson =

Swedish actor

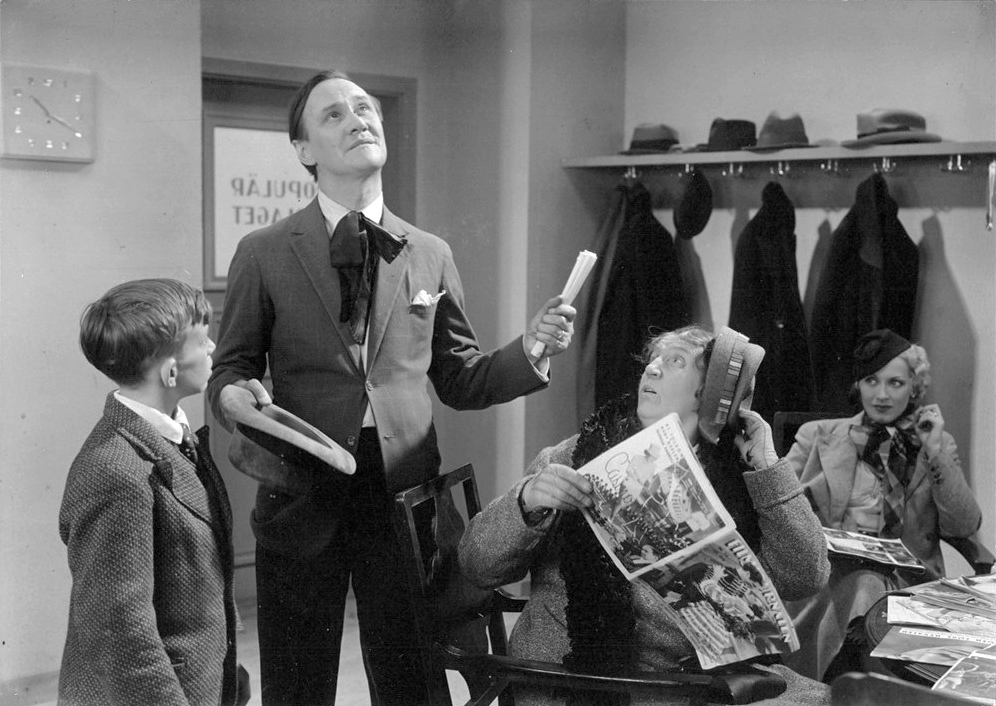
- Gustafson (second from left) in He, She and the Money (1936)
- Born: 15 November 1886; Gothenburg, Sweden
- Died: 19 January 1963 (aged 76)
- Occupation: Actor
- Years active: 1917-1957 (film)

Gösta Gustafson (15 November 1886 – 19 January 1963) was a Swedish stage and film actor. He acted prolifically in the theatre and on screen for several decades.

== Selected filmography ==
- The People of Simlang Valley (1924)
- The Counts at Svansta (1924)
- Ingmar's Inheritance (1925)
- The Girl in Tails (1926)
- Sealed Lips (1927)
- Sin (1928)
- Den starkaste (1929)
- Ulla, My Ulla (1930)
- Kärlek och landstorm (1931)
- Colourful Pages (1931)
- Hotel Paradis (1931)
- Tired Theodore (1931)
- Synnöve Solbakken (1934)
- He, She and the Money (1936)
- The Pale Count (1937)
- A Cruise in the Albertina (1938)
- Adolf Saves the Day (1938)
- Art for Art's Sake (1938)
- A Girl for Me (1943)
- The Old Clock at Ronneberga (1944)
- The Girl and the Devil (1944)
- I Am Fire and Air (1944)
- The Journey Away (1945)
- The Rose of Tistelön (1945)
- Harald the Stalwart (1946)
- The Bells of the Old Town (1946)
- Lars Hård (1948)
- Åsa-Nisse (1949)
- The White Cat (1950)
- The Quartet That Split Up (1950)
- U-Boat 39 (1952)
- The Clang of the Pick (1952)
- Barabbas (1953)
- Unmarried Mothers (1953)
- All the World's Delights (1953)
- The Girl from Backafall (1953)
- Storm Over Tjurö (1954)
- Our Father and the Gypsy (1954)
- Darling of Mine (1955)

== Bibliography ==
- Soister, John T. Conrad Veidt on Screen: A Comprehensive Illustrated Filmography. McFarland, 2002.
- Steene, Birgitta. Ingmar Bergman: A Reference Guide. Amsterdam University Press, 2005.
