= The Southsiders =

1932 film

- Directed by: Weyler Hildebrand
- Written by: Schamyl Bauman; Gideon Wahlberg (play)
- Starring: Gideon Wahlberg; Dagmar Ebbesen; Björn Berglund
- Cinematography: Ernst Westerberg
- Edited by: Ernst Westerberg
- Music by: Erik Baumann
- Production company: Europa Film
- Release date: 27 August 1932
- Running time: 87 minutes
- Country: Sweden
- Language: Swedish

The Southsiders (Swedish: Söderkåkar) is a 1932 Swedish comedy film directed by Weyler Hildebrand and starring Gideon Wahlberg, Dagmar Ebbesen and Björn Berglund. It is set on the southern side of Stockholm.

== Cast ==
- Gideon Wahlberg as Johan
- Dagmar Ebbesen as Hanna
- Björn Berglund as Gunnar
- Edvard Persson as Snickar-Lasse
- Helga Brofeldt as Jana
- Erik Johansson as Erik
- Nita Hårleman as Aurora
- Astrid Marmstedt as Maj-Britt
- Rut Holm as Malin
- Weyler Hildebrand as Constable Karlsson
- Ola Isene as Olsson, mailman
- Wictor Hagman as Josephson
- Nils Karlsson as Painter
- Mona Geijer-Falkner as Lady at the bench
- Helge Andersson as Josephsson's lawyer
- Einar Bryme as Man on the park bench
- Inga-Lilly Forsström as Inga-Lill
- Ivan Åberg as A man

== Bibliography ==
- Gunnar Iverson, Astrid Soderbergh Widding & Tytti Soila. Nordic National Cinemas. Routledge, 2005.
