= En dag skall gry =

1944 film

- Directed by: Hasse Ekman
- Written by: Hasse Ekman; Sven Stolpe
- Produced by: Rune Waldekranz
- Starring: Edvin Adolphson; Elsie Albiin; Hasse Ekman; Sture Lagerwall
- Music by: Carl-Olof Anderberg
- Distributed by: Sandrews
- Release date: 3 January 1944 (Sweden)
- Running time: 95 minutes
- Country: Sweden
- Language: Swedish

En dag skall gry (transl. One day dawning) is a 1944 Swedish drama film directed by Hasse Ekman. The film stars Edvin Adolphson and Elsie Albiin.

== Cast ==
- Edvin Adolphson as major Rolf Dahlman
- Elsie Albiin as Eva Lövgren, doctor
- Hasse Ekman as Rutger von Brewitz, war voluntary
- Sture Lagerwall as Company commander, Captain
- Rune Halvarsson as Nisse Pettersson, war voluntary
- Olof Widgren as Petrus, Salvation Army soldier, war voluntary
- Sven Magnusson as Mikaelsson, war voluntary
- Margaretha Bergström as Maj, Nursing student
- Hugo Björne as Falck, doctor
- Hans Strååt as Lieutenant Löwenskiöld
- Carl Barcklind as Baron Magnus Gabriel von Brewitz
- Kotti Chave as a captain in the train compartment
- Ragnar Falck as a wounded volunteer
- Toivo Pawlo as a wounded Russian soldier
- Hilda Borgström as an old Finnish woman
