= Saturday Nights (film) =

1933 film

- Directed by: Schamyl Bauman
- Written by: Walter Stenström (play); Gideon Wahlberg (play); Schamyl Bauman
- Starring: Edvard Persson; Dagmar Ebbesen; Eivor Kjellström
- Cinematography: Ernst Westerberg
- Edited by: Emil A. Pehrsson
- Music by: Erik Baumann
- Production company: Europa Film
- Distributed by: Europa Film
- Release date: 26 August 1933
- Running time: 85 minutes
- Country: Sweden
- Language: Swedish

Saturday Nights or Saturday Evenings (Swedish: Lördagskvällar) is a 1933 Swedish comedy film directed by Schamyl Bauman and starring Edvard Persson, Dagmar Ebbesen and Eivor Kjellström. It was made at the Sundbyberg Studios of Europa Film in Stockholm. Location shooting took place around Värmdö. The film's sets were designed by the art director Bibi Lindström.

== Cast ==
- Edvard Persson as Nappe Johansson
- Dagmar Ebbesen as Mrs. Engla Johansson
- Eivor Kjellström as Karin Johansson
- Gideon Wahlberg as Johan
- Ruth Weijden as Hanna
- Björn Berglund as Gösta
- Harald Svensson as Johnny Stiernhagen
- Wiola Brunius as Lola
- Mona Geijer-Falkner as Sofie Andersson
- John Wilhelm Hagberg as Singer at the nightclub
- Rut Holm as Majken
- Hugo Jacobsson as Guest at the nightclub
- John Melin as Guest at the nightclub
- Robert Ryberg as Maitre d' at 'Walencia'
- Rulle Bohman as Abel
- Eva Sachtleben as Kristin, Abel's wife
- Hanny Schedin as Dancing woman at the nightclub
- Alf Östlund as Guest at the nightclub

== Bibliography ==
- Wallengren, Ann-Kristin. Welcome Home Mr Swanson: Swedish Emigrants and Swedishness on Film. Nordic Academic Press, 2014.
