= Kärlek och landstorm =

1931 film

- Directed by: Schamyl Bauman
- Written by: Gideon Wahlberg (play); Walter Stenström (play); Schamyl Bauman; Gösta Rodin
- Starring: Gideon Wahlberg; Gösta Gustafson; Ernst Brunman
- Cinematography: Hugo Edlund
- Edited by: Schamyl Bauman; Gösta Rodin
- Music by: Helge Lindberg
- Production company: Europa Film
- Distributed by: Europa Film
- Release date: 24 October 1931
- Running time: 79 minutes
- Country: Sweden
- Language: Swedish

Kärlek och landstorm is a 1931 Swedish comedy film directed by Schamyl Bauman and starring Gideon Wahlberg, Gösta Gustafson and Ernst Brunman. The film's sets were designed by the art director Bertil Duroj. It was based on a play of the same title.

== Synopsis ==
When the First World War breaks out in Europe in 1914, Sweden mobilises its landsturm to protect the country's neutrality.

== Cast ==
- Gideon Wahlberg as Filip Andersson
- Gösta Gustafson as Jacob Söderberg
- Ernst Brunman as Josua Söderberg
- Aina Rosén as Frida Söderberg
- Thor Christiernsson as Flink
- Carl-Gunnar Wingård as Salven
- Ola Isene as Brandt
- Wictor Hagman as Dalenius
- Mary Gräber as Mia

== Bibliography ==
- Larsson, Mariah & Marklund, Anders. Swedish Film: An Introduction and Reader. Nordic Academic Press, 2010.
