= Say It with Music (1929 film) =

1929 film

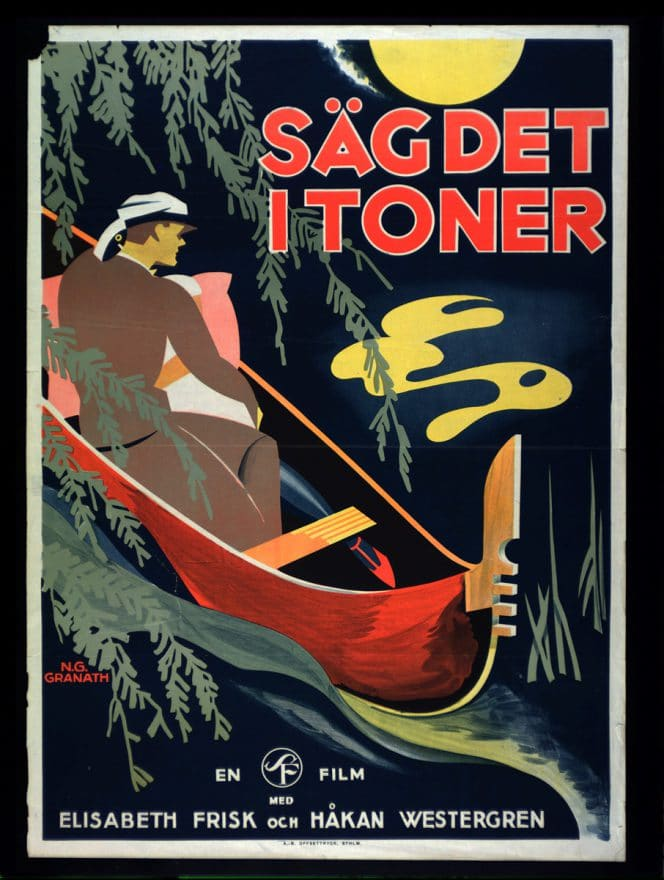
- Directed by: Edvin Adolphson; Julius Jaenzon
- Written by: Paul Merzbach
- Produced by: Vilhelm Bryde
- Starring: Håkan Westergren; Elisabeth Frisk; Stina Berg
- Cinematography: Julius Jaenzon
- Edited by: Rolf Husberg
- Music by: Sonja Sahlberg
- Production company: Svensk Filmindustri
- Distributed by: Svensk Filmindustri
- Release date: 26 December 1929
- Running time: 86 minutes
- Country: Sweden
- Language: Swedish

Say It with Music (Swedish: Säg det i toner) is a 1929 Swedish musical film directed by Edvin Adolphson and Julius Jaenzon and starring Håkan Westergren, Elisabeth Frisk and Stina Berg. It was shot at the Råsunda Studios in Stockholm with a soundtrack added in a Berlin studio that had been converted to sound. The film's sets were designed by art director Vilhelm Bryde. It came during the switch from silent to sound film and lacks any dialogue. It was one of three Swedish films released that year that including some element of sound, and came at a time when film production was in crisis with no films released during the first nine months of 1929. It is also known by the English-language alternative title The Dream Waltz.

== Cast ==
- Håkan Westergren as Olof Svensson
- Stina Berg as Mrs. Svensson
- Elisabeth Frisk as Lisa Lindahl
- Tore Svennberg as Mr. Lindahl
- Jenny Hasselqvist as Mrs. Lindahl
- Margit Manstad as Ingrid Mårtenson
- Edvin Adolphson as Mrs. Lindahl's lover
- Erik Malmberg as Man
- Axel Nilsson as Man
- Björn Berglund as Nutte
- Helga Brofeldt as Woman at restaurant
- Ossian Brofeldt as Husband at restaurant
- Knut Frankman as Docker
- Karl Gerhard as Self
- Eric Gustafson as Man who borrows matches
- Justus Hagman as Cashier
- Sture Lagerwall as Olof's friend
- Herman Lantz as Docker at accident
- Thyra Leijman-Uppström as Maid
- Otto Malmberg as Servant
- Nils Ohlin as Man at music publishing company
- Aina Rosén as Clerk at music publishing company
- Stina Ståhle as Clerk at music publishing company
- Åke Uppström as Olof's friend
- Astrid Wedberg as Lindahl's Maid
- Karl Wehle as The great composer
- Kurt Welin as Student

== Bibliography ==
- Gustafsson, Tommy. Masculinity in the Golden Age of Swedish Cinema: A Cultural Analysis of 1920s Films. McFarland, 2014.
