= Eric Gustafson =

Swedish actor

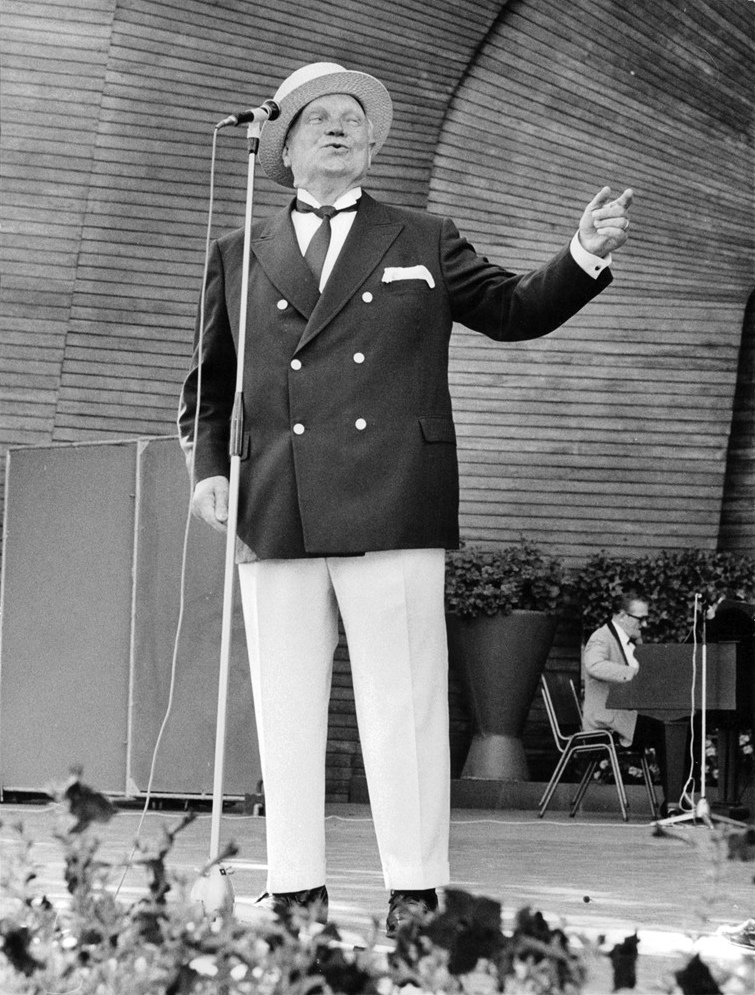
- Eric Gustafson, 1969
- Born: 27 May 1897; Växjö, Sweden
- Died: 9 April 1981 (aged 83); Stockholm, Sweden
- Occupation: Actor
- Years active: 1920-1979

Eric Gustafson (27 May 1897 – 9 April 1981) was a Swedish actor. He appeared in more than 70 films between 1920 and 1979.

== Selected filmography ==
- Karin Daughter of Ingmar (1920)
- Her Little Majesty (1925)
- His English Wife (1927)
- Sin (1928)
- Say It with Music (1929)
- Ulla, My Ulla (1930)
- Dante's Mysteries (1931)
- Ship Ahoy! (1931)
- Colourful Pages (1931)
- International Match (1932)
- A Wedding Night at Stjarnehov (1934)
- Under False Flag (1935)
- Our Boy (1936)
- It Pays to Advertise (1936)
- Russian Flu (1937)
- Julia jubilerar (1938)
- Frestelse (1940)
- Lärarinna på vift (1941)
- Dunungen (1941)
- The Train Leaves at Nine (1941)
- A Girl for Me (1943)
- The Emperor of Portugallia (1944)
- The Österman Brothers' Virago (1945)
- Incorrigible (1946)
- Olof – forsfararen (1947)
- Private Karlsson on Leave (1947)
- Song of Stockholm (1947)
- Carnival Evening (1948)
- Living on 'Hope' (1951)
- A Ghost on Holiday (1951)
- Kalle Karlsson of Jularbo (1952)
- Dance in the Smoke (1954)
- Darling of Mine (1955)
- The Halo Is Slipping (1957)
