= 10th Guldbagge Awards =

Annual Swedish film awards ceremony

- Date: 16 September 1974
- Site: Hasselbacken, Stockholm, Sweden

Highlights
- Best Picture: A Handful of Love

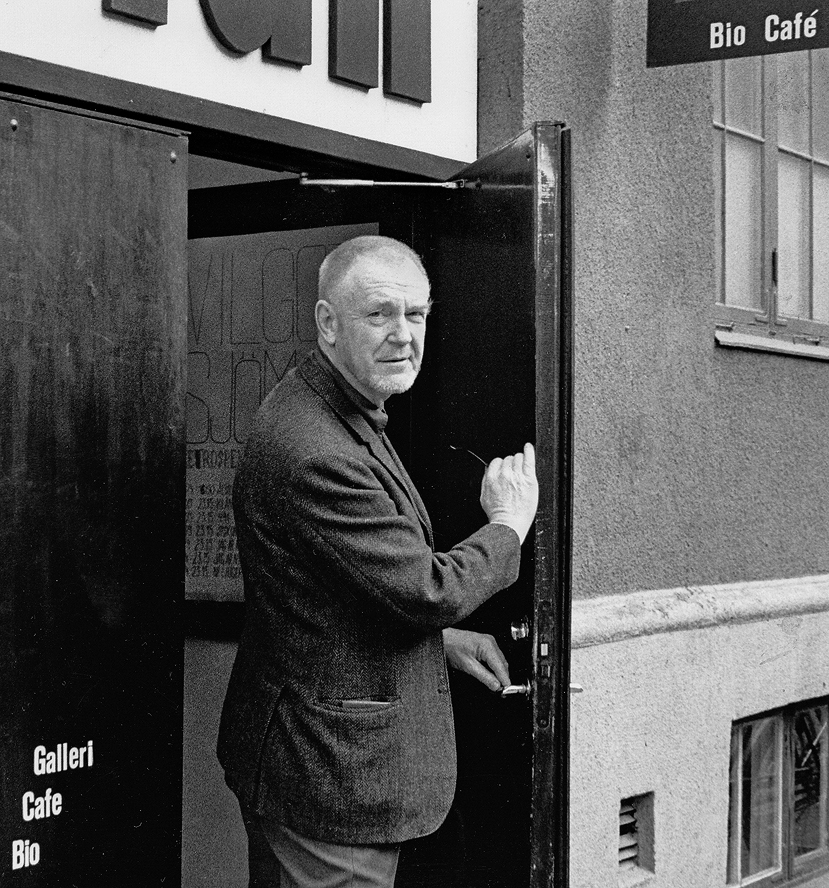
Vilgot Sjöman, 1987

The 10th Guldbagge Awards ceremony, presented by the Swedish Film Institute, honored the best Swedish films of 1973 and 1974, and took place on 16 September 1974. A Handful of Love directed by Vilgot Sjöman was presented with the award for Best Film.

== Awards ==
- Best Film: A Handful of Love by Vilgot Sjöman
- Best Director: Vilgot Sjöman for A Handful of Love
- Best Actor: Allan Edwall for Emil and the Piglet
- Best Actress: Inga Tidblad for Pistol
- Special Achievement: P. A. Lundgren for A Handful of Love
