= Arbisteatern =

Theatre in Norrköping, Sweden

Coordinates: 58°35′24″N 16°10′30″E

Arbis Theatre
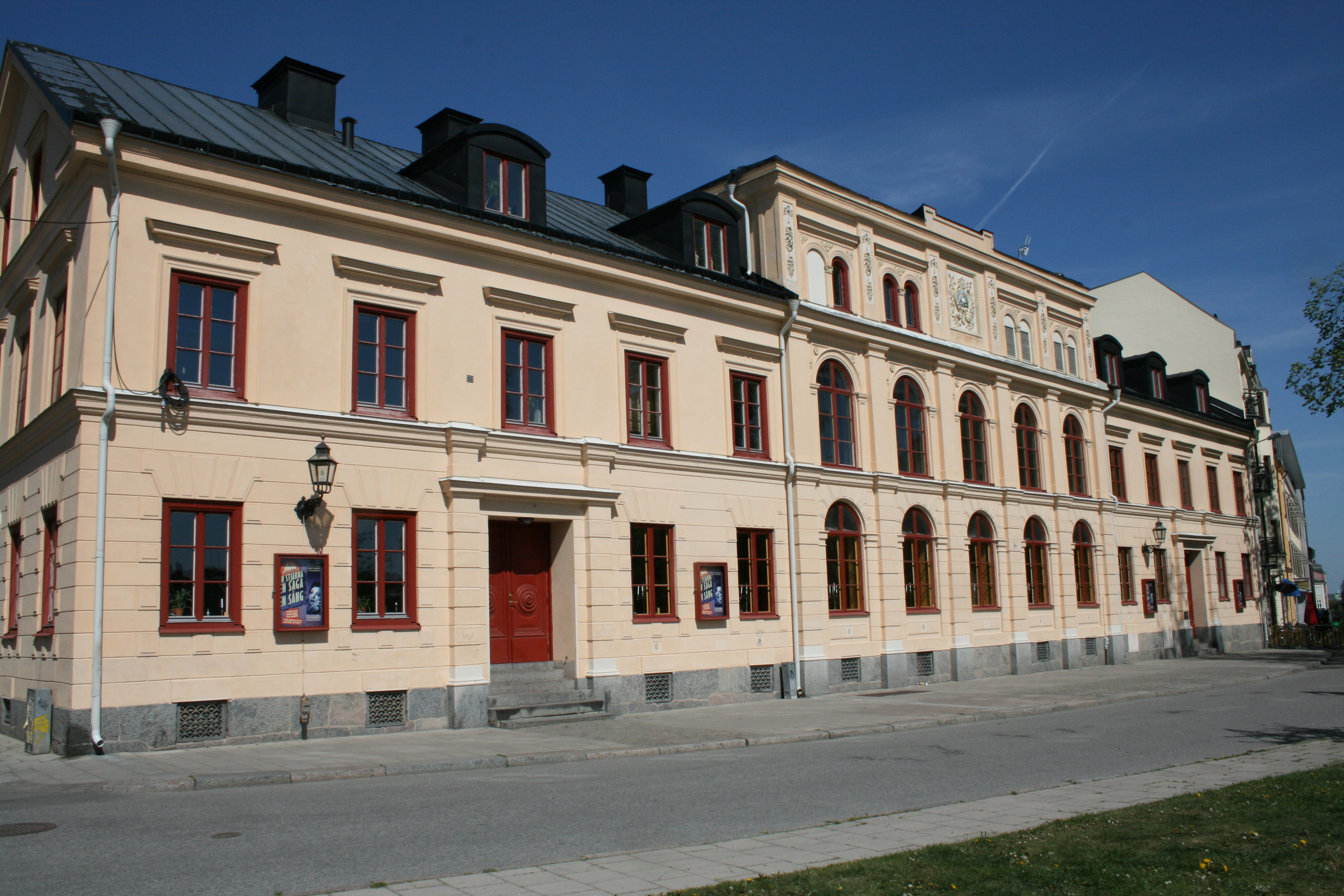
- The exterior of the Arbis Theatre
- Interactive map of Arbis Theatre
- Address: Bredgatan 54; Norrköping; Sweden
- Type: Non-profit Producing Theatre; Artistic Director Robin Karlsson

Construction
- Opened: 1865

Website
- Arbis website

Arbisteatern (The Arbis theatre) in the city of Norrköping, Sweden, is the country's oldest amateur theatre stage, famous for productions where professional actors and amateurs work together.

== History ==
Built in 1864, it opened in 1865. Several famous actors and actresses have made their debut or performed on the stage early in their career, most famously Zarah Leander.

Many plays, operettas and musicals have been produced in the theatre, but also revues and variety shows. Gideon Wahlberg managed the theatre between 1918-1931 and 1933–1934, and many of his shows were also performed there. Between 1964 and 2001, Arbisteatern was the home of Norrköping's Operetta Society.

In 2012, the theatre briefly closed but soon re-opened with new artistic direction.

== Name ==
"Arbis" is an abbreviation of Norrköpings Arbetareförenings teater, which means The theatre of Norrköping's worker society.
