= Frida's Songs =

1930 film

- Directed by: Gustaf Molander
- Written by: Ragnar Hyltén-Cavallius; Birger Sjöberg
- Produced by: Vilhelm Bryde
- Starring: Elisabeth Frisk; Bengt Djurberg; Tore Svennberg
- Cinematography: Julius Jaenzon
- Edited by: Julius Jaenzon
- Music by: Eric Bengtson
- Production company: Film AB Minerva
- Distributed by: Svensk Filmindustri
- Release date: 15 September 1930
- Running time: 82 minutes
- Country: Sweden
- Language: Swedish

Frida's Songs (Swedish: Fridas visor) is a 1930 Swedish comedy film directed by Gustaf Molander and starring Elisabeth Frisk, Bengt Djurberg and Tore Svennberg. It was shot at the Råsunda Studios in Stockholm. The film's sets were designed by the art director Vilhelm Bryde.

This was the debut film of actress Annalisa Ericson.

== Cast ==
- Elisabeth Frisk as Frida Blomgren
- Bengt Djurberg as Åke Brunander
- Tore Svennberg as Brickman
- Sigurd Wallén as Gyllberg
- Håkan Westergren as Hasse Brickman
- Lili Lani as Miss Daisy
- Albert Paulig as Kaufmann
- Harry Ahlin as Clown
- Charlie Almlöf as Visitor at the circus
- Helge Andersson as Worker at the circus
- Ossian Brofeldt as Visitor at the circus
- Ernst Brunman as Singer
- Thor Christiernsson as Older man
- Annalisa Ericson as Dancer
- Harry Essing as Lauging visitor at the circus
- Hartwig Fock as Father with twins
- Hilding Gavle as Visitor at the circus
- Mona Geijer-Falkner as Waitress
- Disa Gillis as Lilla Grisen
- Thure Holm as Older man
- Sune Holmqvist as Boy
- Jullan Jonsson as The fireman's mother
- Helge Kihlberg as Police lieutenant
- Dagny Lind as One of Hasse's girlfriends
- Hugo Lundström as Visitor at the circus
- Sven Magnusson as Young guest at the restaurant
- John Melin as Fireman
- Gull Natorp as Post clerk
- Rutger Nygren as Fireman
- Gustaf Salzenstein as Visitor at the circus
- Åke Uppström as Lauging visitor at the circus
- Tom Walter as Visitor at the circus

== Bibliography ==
- Wallengren, Ann-Kristin. Welcome Home Mr Swanson: Swedish Emigrants and Swedishness on Film. Nordic Academic Press, 2014.
