= Oscar Hemberg =

(1881–1944) Swedish screenwriter, and newspaper editor

- Born: 26 July 1881; Östraby parish
- Died: 14 May 1944; Gustav Vasa parish
- Occupations: Screenwriter, newspaper editor

Olof Oscar Hemberg (26 July 1881 – 14 May 1944) was a Swedish newspaper editor, writer and film producer. He has been credited with writing 21 films and producing eight films. Hemberg is best known for writing many screenplays for the director Schamyl Bauman including Witches' Night (1937) starring Gösta Ekman, På Solsidan for Gustaf Molander, starring Ingrid Bergman, and The Girls' Alfred (1935) for Edvin Adolphson, starring Sture Lagerwall. He also wrote the screenplay for the Danish film Idag Begynder Livet for Lau Lauritzen Jr. and Alice O'Fredericks. Furthermore, Hemberg produced several films for Gustaf Molander, including Paresiennes, and His English Wife, as well as Bara en danserska by Olof Molander.

== Career ==
Oscar Hemberg commenced his journalistic career in 1897, covering the 'Sjöbom murders' for two Swedish evening newspapers. He then began working as a volunteer at Skåne Tidningen, which was dissolved the following year. Hemberg began his studies in Lund, but after a couple of years he dropped out and in 1901 once again ventured into journalism, this time for Malmötidningen, as its police correspondent. During this time period he first started to appear in 'Dagens Nyheter', one of the largest Swedish newspapers. A few years on Hemberg became Dagens Nyheter's Malmö correspondent. He eventually moved to the newspapers head office in Stockholm, as deputy editor. He is recognised, together with Anton Karlgren, to have radically modernised Dagens Nyheter's layout, and format. In 1909 he was integral to the launching of a new front page format which consisted of large images and sensational headlines, instead of advertisements. Furthermore, Hemberg was one of the first in Swedish press to realise the newsworthiness of sports, and organised sports tournaments under the newspaper's banner. He also added business and finance news, a Sunday paper, and expanded the special interest section for female readers. Hemberg was deeply inspired by British press, as well as the Danish paper 'Politiken'. Ellen Rydelius described Oscar Hemberg as "a mix between a snake charmer and a slave driver".

Though Hemberg has authored theatre pieces during his time in Malmö, in 1916, he began focusing completely on writing film scripts. In total he authored 21 films, and produced eight films. Furthermore, he authored several plays including: "Här ska valsas" put up on Folkteatern in 1911, and "Kör fram till stora trappan" put up at Oscarsteatern in 1911. Hemberg also wrote "schlager" songs for Sigurd Wallén and Ernst Rolf, as well as couplets for Hansy Petra. In 1920–21 he served as the head of acquisitions for Svensk Filmindustri (SF), 1922–26 head of SF's theatres in Stockholm, 1926–27 the CEO of Filmab Isepa, and in 1928 executive producer for Deutsche Filmunion in Berlin.

Oscar Hemberg wrote the film script for "På Solsidan" starring Ingrid Bergman, together with Gösta Stevens and Helge Krog. He also produced "The Ingmar Inheritance" in 1925 starring Conrad Veidt, directed by Gustaf Molander, which was an adaptation of Selma Lagerlöf's 'Jermusalem' novels. Hemberg worked frequently with Gustaf Molander and his brother Olof Molander, producing the films Parisiennes in 1928, Förseglade läppar and His English Wife in 1927, and Bara en danserska and Till österland in 1926. Hemberg wrote "The Girls' Alfred" in 1935, directed by Edvin Adolphson, starring Sture Lagerwall, and in 1940 "Stora Famnen", starring Sigurd Wallen.

== Personal life ==
Olof Oscar Hemberg was born on 26 July 1881 in Östraby to the farmer Anders, and his wife Anna, and died on 14 May 1944 in Stockholm. Hemberg married Clara Laurentia Antonsson on 31 March 1904 in Malmö. His second wife was Emmy Hildur Elisabeth Holgersson, whom he married on 20 December 1904 in Stockholm.

== Filmography ==
=== Writer ===
- 1949 Woman in White (uncredited)
- 1940 With Open Arms
- 1940 Än en gång Gösta Ekman (Short)
- 1939 Life Begins Today
- 1939 I dag börjar livet (screenplay)
- 1939 Wanted
- 1938 Styrman Karlssons flammor
- 1938 Comrades in Uniform
- 1937 Vi går landsvägen
- 1937 Witches' Night
- 1936 Raggen
- 1936 På solsidan
- 1935 Flickor på fabrik
- 1935 The Girls' Alfred (screenplay)
- 1934 Simon of Backabo
- 1934 False Greta
- 1924 Livet på landet
- 1923 Boman at the Exhibition
- 1916 Bengts nya kärlek eller var är barnet?
- 1915 Hjälte mot sin vilja
- 1915 I kronans kläder (Short)

=== Producer ===
- 1928 Majestät schneidet Bubiköpfe
- 1928 Parisiennes
- 1927 Sealed Lips
- 1927 His English Wife
- 1926 Only a Dancing Girl
- 1926 To the Orient
- 1925 Ingmarsarvet
- 1924 Life in the Country

=== Soundtrack ===
- 1934 Falska Greta (lyrics: "Jag vet ej vem du är", "Ni är ensam, jag är ensam men tillsammans blir vi två ") / (writer: "Jag vet ej vem du är", "Ni är ensam, jag är ensam men tillsammans blir vi två ")

=== Actor ===
- 1911 Hon fick platsen – Editor
