= Dante's Mysteries =

1931 film

- Directed by: Paul Merzbach
- Written by: Paul Merzbach
- Starring: Dante; Elisabeth Frisk; Zarah Leander
- Cinematography: Åke Dahlqvist
- Music by: Jules Sylvain
- Production company: Svensk Filmindustri
- Distributed by: Svensk Filmindustri
- Release date: 23 February 1931
- Running time: 71 minutes
- Country: Sweden
- Language: Swedish

Dante's Mysteries (Swedish: Dantes mysterier) is a 1931 Swedish drama film written and directed by Paul Merzbach and starring Dante, Elisabeth Frisk and Zarah Leander. It was shot at the Råsunda Studios in Stockholm. The film's sets were designed by the art director Arne Åkermark. It marked the film debut of Leander who went on to be a star of German cinema.

== Synopsis ==
The plot revolves around a famous conjurer who performs his most famous tricks at a fashionable hotel.

== Cast ==
- Dante as Self
- Elisabeth Frisk as Dante's Wife / Young Chinese Girl
- Zarah Leander as Grand Café Guest / Singing Demon
- Eric Abrahamsson as First crook
- Gustaf Lövås as Second crook
- Eric Gustafson as Café Grand Maître d'
- Charlie Almlöf as Journalist
- Georg Fernqvist as Journalist
- Alexander Field as Crook
- Paul Hagman as Journalist
- Frithiof Hedvall as Grand Café Guest
- Sune Holmqvist as Bellboy
- Helge Kihlberg as Grand Café Guest
- Eva Leckström as Dancing Girl With Matches
- Gunhild Sundelies as Grand Café Guest
- Ulla Söderbaum as Dancing Girl With Matches

== Bibliography ==
- Bock, Hans-Michael and Bergfelder, Tim. The Concise Cinegraph: An Encyclopedia of German Cinema. Berghahn Books, 2009.
