= Den starkaste =

1929 Swedish silent film

- Film poster
- Directed by: Axel Lindblom; Alf Sjöberg
- Written by: Axel Lindblom; Alf Sjöberg
- Starring: Bengt Djurberg; Anders Henrikson; Gösta Gustafson
- Cinematography: Axel Lindblom
- Production company: Svensk Filmindustri
- Distributed by: Svensk Filmindustri
- Release date: 28 October 1929
- Running time: 97 minutes
- Country: Sweden
- Languages: Silent; Swedish intertitles

Den starkaste is a 1929 Swedish silent drama film directed by Axel Lindblom and Alf Sjöberg and starring Bengt Djurberg, Anders Henrikson and Gösta Gustafson. It was Sjöberg's debut film as a director. It was shot at the Råsunda Studios and on location in Norway. The film's sets were designed by the art director Vilhelm Bryde.

Lindblom was inspired by a 1920 expedition to Bjørnøya and Spitsbergen in Svalbard to develop a film about the lives of people living in the Arctic circle. The film, which was reported to be Svensk Filmindustri's fourth production of the year, involved a directorial collaboration between Lindblom and Sjöberg, the latter an actor at the Royal Dramatic Theatre. Lindblom and Sjöberg co-wrote the script. On 22 May 1929, the production departed Stockholm by train for Narvik and Tromsø to begin a planned two-month filming expedition.

== Cast ==
- Bengt Djurberg as Gustaf
- Anders Henrikson as Ole
- Gösta Gustafson as Jens
- Gun Holmqvist as Ingeborg Larsen
- Kare Pederson as Kare
- Hjalmar Peters as Larsen
- Maria Röhr as Grandmother
- Sivert Brækemo as Olsen

== Bibliography ==
- Gustafsson, Tommy. Masculinity in the Golden Age of Swedish Cinema: A Cultural Analysis of 1920s Films. McFarland, 2014.
- Kwiatkowski, Aleksander. Swedish Film Classics: A Pictorial Survey of 25 Films from 1913 to 1957. Courier Dover Publications, 1983.
