= Ulla, My Ulla =

1930 film

- Directed by: Julius Jaenzon
- Written by: Edvin Liedner (play); Sölve Cederstrand
- Starring: Torsten Winge; Åke Claesson; Greta Söderberg
- Cinematography: Julius Jaenzon
- Music by: Arvid Petersén
- Production company: Film AB Minerva
- Release date: 27 October 1930
- Running time: 75 minutes
- Country: Sweden
- Language: Swedish

Ulla, My Ulla (Swedish: Ulla min Ulla) is a 1930 Swedish historical drama film directed by Julius Jaenzon and starring Torsten Winge, Åke Claesson and Greta Söderberg. It is based on a play about the eighteenth-century composer Carl Michael Bellman, and it takes its title from one of his most popular songs.

The film was shot at Filmstaden in Råsunda, Stockholm. The film's sets were designed by the art director Vilhelm Bryde.

== Cast ==
- Torsten Winge as Gustaf III
- Åke Claesson as Carl Michael Bellman
- Greta Söderberg as Ulla Winblad
- Brita Appelgren as Anne-Charlotte von Stapelmohr
- Olga Adamsén as Lärkstämma's Mother
- Georg Blomstedt as Guest at Tuppen
- Ernst Brunman as Mollberg
- Artur Cederborgh as Elis Schröderheim
- Birgit Chenon as Lady in Waiting
- Thor Christiernsson as Courtier
- Erland Colliander as Puckel
- Elsa Ebbesen as Kajsa-Stina, waitress at Tuppen
- Tore Ericsson as Court Valet
- Arvid Erwall as Movitz
- Georg Fernqvist as Court Valet
- Karin Granberg as Kolmätar-Lotta
- Nils Granberg as Court Valet
- Eric Gustafson as Lärkstämma
- Gösta Gustafson as Ahlquitter
- Paul Hagman as Courtier
- Wictor Hagman as Kax Kymmonpylotta
- Greta Hallgren as Waitress at Blå Porten
- Olle Hilding as Court Valet
- Maja Jerlström as Waitress at Blå Porten
- Nils Karlsson as Policeman
- Knut Lambert as Appolonius
- Hjalmar Lindblad as Policeman
- Hugo Lundström as Petter Nordström
- Otto Malmberg as Bergström
- Arvid Petersén as Fader Berg
- Edla Rothgardt as Lady in Waiting
- Valborg Svensson as Anna-Lisa, waitress at Tuppen
- Sven Wahlström as Court Valet
- Harald Wehlnor as Wingmark
- Ruth Weijden as Mutter at Tuppen
- Olof Widgren as Fredman

== Bibliography ==
- Goble, Alan. The Complete Index to Literary Sources in Film. Walter de Gruyter, 1999.
