= Divorced (1951 film) =

1951 film by Gustaf Molander

- Directed by: Gustaf Molander
- Written by: Herbert Grevenius; Ingmar Bergman
- Produced by: Allan Ekelund
- Starring: Inga Tidblad; Alf Kjellin; Doris Svedlund
- Cinematography: Åke Dahlqvist
- Edited by: Oscar Rosander
- Music by: Erik Nordgren
- Distributed by: AB Svensk Filmindustri
- Release date: 26 December 1951
- Running time: 103 minutes
- Country: Sweden
- Language: Swedish

Divorced (Swedish: Frånskild) is a 1951 Swedish drama film directed by Gustaf Molander and written by Ingmar Bergman.

== Synopsis ==
After 20 years of marriage, Gertrude is abandoned by her husband. Feeling both offended and dissatisfied with the situation, she leaves her house and rents a room. The landlady's son is attracted to her and tries to help her out of her loneliness.

== Cast ==
- Inga Tidblad as Gertrud Holmgren
- Alf Kjellin as Dr. Bertil Nordelius
- Doris Svedlund as Marianne Berg
- Hjördis Petterson as Mrs. Lobelius
- Håkan Westergren as P.A. Beckman
- Irma Christenson as Cecilia Lindeman
- Holger Löwenadler as Tore Holmgren
- Marianne Löfgren as Mrs. Ingeborg
- Stig Olin as Hans
- Elsa Prawitz as Elsie
- Birgitta Valberg as Eva Möller
- Sif Ruud as Rut Boman
- Carl Ström as Öhman
- Ingrid Borthen as Dinner guest
- Yvonne Lombard as The young wife
