= Father and Son (1930 film) =

1930 film

- Directed by: Victor Sjöström
- Written by: Hjalmar Bergman (novel); Paul Merzbach
- Starring: Rudolf Rittner; Franziska Kinz; Martin Herzberg
- Cinematography: Julius Jaenzon
- Music by: Friedrich Kuhlau; Jules Sylvain
- Production companies: Svensk Filmindustri; Terra Film
- Distributed by: Terra Film
- Release date: 28 November 1930
- Countries: Germany; Sweden
- Language: German

Father and Son (German: Väter und Söhne) is a 1930 German-Swedish film directed by Victor Sjöström and starring Rudolf Rittner, Franziska Kinz and Martin Herzberg. It was shot at the Råsunda Studios in Stockholm. The film's sets were designed by the art director Vilhelm Bryde. A separate Swedish-language film was released the following year.

== Cast ==
- Rudolf Rittner as Harald Hilding Markurell, the Innkeeper
- Franziska Kinz as Mrs. Karin Markurell
- Martin Herzberg as Johann Markurell
- Alfred Gerasch as Karl-Magnus de Lorche
- Carl Balhaus as Louis de Lorche
- Elfriede Borodin as Brita, the niece of Karl-Magnus
- Ernst Gronau as Sven Ström, the Barber
- Artur Retzbach as Per Ström, his brother, the School Janitor
- Philipp Manning as Principal
- Gustav Rickelt as the Dean. School Censor
- Ernst Dernburg as the Chemistry Professor. School Censor

== Bibliography ==
- Parish, James Robert; Pitts, Michael R. (1974). Film Directors: A Guide to Their American Films. Scarecrow Press. ISBN 978-0-8108-0752-5.
