= Pistol (film) =

1973 film

- Film poster
- Directed by: George Tirl
- Written by: George Tirl
- Produced by: Bengt Forslund
- Starring: Inga Tidblad
- Cinematography: George Tirl
- Release date: 28 October 1973
- Running time: 79 minutes
- Country: Sweden
- Language: Swedish

Pistol (Swedish: Pistolen) is a 1973 Swedish drama film directed by George Tirl. Inga Tidblad won the award for Best Actress at the 10th Guldbagge Awards.

== Cast ==
- Inga Tidblad as Alisia von Svärd
- Gunnar Björnstrand as Alisia's Friend
- Håkan Westergren as Albert
- Nils Eklund
- Bernt Lundquist as Foreman
- Bertil Norström as Chief Superintendent
- Lennart Pilotti as Witness
- Åke Lindström as Mayor
- Carl-Axel Elfving
- Birger Åsander
