= The Counts at Svansta =

1924 film

- Directed by: Sigurd Wallén
- Written by: Einar Fröberg
- Starring: Einar Fröberg; Hugo Björne; Magda Holm
- Cinematography: Henrik Jaenzon
- Production company: Bewefilm
- Distributed by: Wahlströms Filmbyrå
- Release date: 24 November 1924
- Running time: 70 minutes
- Country: Sweden
- Languages: Silent; Swedish intertitles

The Counts at Svansta (Swedish: Grevarna på Svansta) is a 1924 Swedish silent drama film directed by Sigurd Wallén and starring Einar Fröberg, Hugo Björne and Magda Holm.

== Cast ==
- Einar Fröberg as Count Nils Storm
- Hugo Björne as Per Storm
- Thure Holm as Hans Wärner
- Magda Holm as Elina
- Inga Tidblad as Ofelia Grane
- Manda Björling as Baroness Gustava Grane
- Gerda Björne as Emilia Grane
- Carl Browallius as Baron Grane
- Gösta Gustafson as Ståhl
- Justus Hagman as The Doctor
- Inez Lundmark-Hermelin as Cecilia Grane
- Harry Roeck Hansen as Gipsy
- Tor Weijden as Luffar-Jonte

== Bibliography ==
- Larsson, Mariah & Marklund, Anders. Swedish Film: An Introduction and Reader. Nordic Academic Press, 2010.
