= Parisiennes (film) =

1928 German-Swedish silent film

- Directed by: Gustaf Molander
- Written by: Paul Merzbach
- Produced by: Oscar Hemberg
- Starring: Margit Manstad; Ruth Weyher; Fred Louis Lerch
- Cinematography: Julius Jaenzon
- Production companies: UFA; Isepa
- Distributed by: UFA
- Release date: 24 February 1928
- Running time: 100 minutes
- Countries: Germany; Sweden
- Languages: Silent; German intertitles

Parisiennes or The Doctor's Women (Swedish: Parisiskor, German: Dr. Monnier und die Frauen) is a 1928 German-Swedish silent film directed by Gustaf Molander and starring Margit Manstad, Ruth Weyher and Fred Louis Lerch.

The film's sets were designed by the art director Robert Neppach.

== Cast ==
- Margit Manstad as Nita Duval
- Ruth Weyher as Jeanne Duval
- Fred Louis Lerch as Dr. Leon Monnier
- Miles Mander as Armand de Marny
- Alexander Murski as Gambetta Duval, der Vater
- Karin Swanström as Rose Duval, die Witwe
- Margita Alfvén as Ms. Savelly, Schauspielerin
- Norah Baring
- Georg Blomstedt as Pinet, Theaterdirektor
- Hans Junkermann as Count Rochefort
- Alexander Nadler as Der kleine Philippe
- Alexandra Nalder as Philippa
- Jeanne Weiß as Eine elegante Dame
- Elisabeth Frisk

== Bibliography ==
- Tommy Gustafsson. Masculinity in the Golden Age of Swedish Cinema: A Cultural Analysis of 1920s Films. McFarland, 2014.
