= The Triumph of the Heart =

1929 film

- Directed by: Gustaf Molander
- Written by: Paul Merzbach
- Produced by: Vilhelm Bryde
- Starring: Carl Brisson; Lissy Arna; Edvin Adolphson
- Cinematography: Julius Jaenzon; Axel Lindblom
- Production companies: Svensk Filmindustri; British International Pictures
- Release date: 16 September 1929
- Running time: 94 minutes
- Country: Sweden
- Languages: Silent; Swedish intertitles

The Triumph of the Heart (Swedish: Hjärtats triumf) is a 1929 Swedish-British silent drama film directed by Gustaf Molander and starring Carl Brisson, Lissy Arna and Edvin Adolphson. It was shot at the Råsunda Studios in Stockholm. The film's sets were designed by the art director Vilhelm Bryde. The film was made in partnership with British International Pictures and was given a British release in 1930 under the alternative title of False Gold.

== Plot ==
In a small mining town north of the Arctic Circle, an old gold treasure is rumored to be hidden somewhere in the mountains. Two men venture into the wilderness to look for it.

== Cast ==
- Carl Brisson as Lars Holm
- Lissy Arna as Märta Tamm
- Edvin Adolphson as Torsten Bergström
- Harry Ahlin as Miner
- Bengt Djurberg as Miner
- Weyler Hildebrand as Miner
- Axel Hultman as Axel Tamm
- Lisskulla Jobs as Young Woman
- Anna Lindahl as Eva Bergström
- Tor Weijden as Miner
- Waldemar Wohlström as Heikka

== Bibliography ==
- Tommy Gustafsson. Masculinity in the Golden Age of Swedish Cinema: A Cultural Analysis of 1920s Films. McFarland, 2014.
