= Sin (1928 film) =

1928 film

- Directed by: Gustaf Molander
- Written by: Paul Merzbach
- Based on: Brott och brott by August Strindberg
- Produced by: Vilhelm Bryde
- Starring: Lars Hanson; Elissa Landi; Gina Manès
- Cinematography: Julius Jaenzon
- Production companies: Film AB Minerva; British Instructional Films; Hisa-Film-Vertrieb; Svenska Film
- Distributed by: Svensk Filmindustri; Pro Patria; Bavaria Film
- Release dates: 17 September 1928 (Stockholm); 14 January 1929 (London)
- Running time: 89 minutes
- Country: Sweden
- Languages: Silent; Swedish intertitles

Sin (Swedish: Synd, German: Rausch) is a 1928 silent drama film directed by Gustaf Molander and starring Lars Hanson, Elissa Landi and Gina Manès. A German-Swedish-British co-production, it premiered in Sweden in September 1928 but was not released in London until January 1929.

It was shot at the Råsunda Studios in Stockholm and on location in the city. The film's sets were designed by the art director Vilhelm Bryde, who also produced the film. It is based on an 1899 play Brott och brott (There are crimes and crimes) by August Strindberg which had previously been made into a 1919 film Intoxication, directed by Ernst Lubitsch.

== Synopsis ==
Maurice is a struggling playwright in Paris, whose lack of success means he and his daughter Marion have to be supported by his wife Jeanne, putting severe strain on the marriage. When Maurice does enjoy a success at last he is lured by the femme fatale actress Henriette who desires a sexual relationship with him. He is brought back to his senses, however, when his daughter Marion disappears.

== Cast ==
- Lars Hanson as Maurice Gérard, the Writer
- Elissa Landi as Jeanne, Gérard's Wife
- Anita Hugo as Marion, Lars' and Jeanne's 5-y-o Daughter
- Gina Manès as Henriette Mauclerc, the Actress
- Hugo Björne as Adolphe, the Painter
- Stina Berg as Madame Cathérine, the Café Owner
- Carl Apolloff as Theater director's valet
- Ragnar Arvedson as Guest
- Georgina Barcklind as Henriettes påkläderska
- Erik 'Bullen' Berglund as Maitre d' at the Royal
- Jenny Broberg as Portvaktsfrun
- Ossian Brofeldt as Neighbor
- Carl Browallius as Judge
- Gucken Cederborg as Theater spectator
- John Ekman as Theatre Director
- Nils Ekstam as Café guest
- Eric Gustafson as Theatre Spectator
- Gösta Gustafson as Guest
- Justus Hagman as Old theatre guard
- Ivan Hedqvist as Jeanne's Father
- Thure Holm as Older theatre spectator with mustache
- Nils Jacobsson as Guest
- Ludde Juberg as Theater spectator
- Kolbjörn Knudsen as Guest
- Knut Lambert as Man in theater
- Herman Lantz as Statist in theater scene
- John Melin as Guest
- Gustaf Salzenstein as Neighbor girl's father
- Ida Schylander as Older theater spectator
- Fredrik Stenfeldt as Old man who found Marion by the river
- Emile Stiebel as Theatre Director
- Albert Ståhl as Courtmaster
- Birgit Tengroth as Girl Nextdoor
- Wilhelm Tunelli as Café guest
- Ruth Weijden as Theatre Spectator
- Kurt Welin as Theatre Spectator

== Bibliography ==
- Gustafsson, Tommy. Masculinity in the Golden Age of Swedish Cinema: A Cultural Analysis of 1920s Films. McFarland, 2014.
