= Brita Appelgren =

Swedish actress (1912–1999)

- Born: Disa Britta Jakobina Appelgren; 21 December 1912; Stockholm, Sweden
- Died: 29 October 1999 (aged 86); Stockholm, Sweden
- Occupation: Actress
- Years active: 1926–1936 (film)

Brita Appelgren (21 December 1912 – 29 October 1999) was a Swedish film actress.

== Selected filmography ==
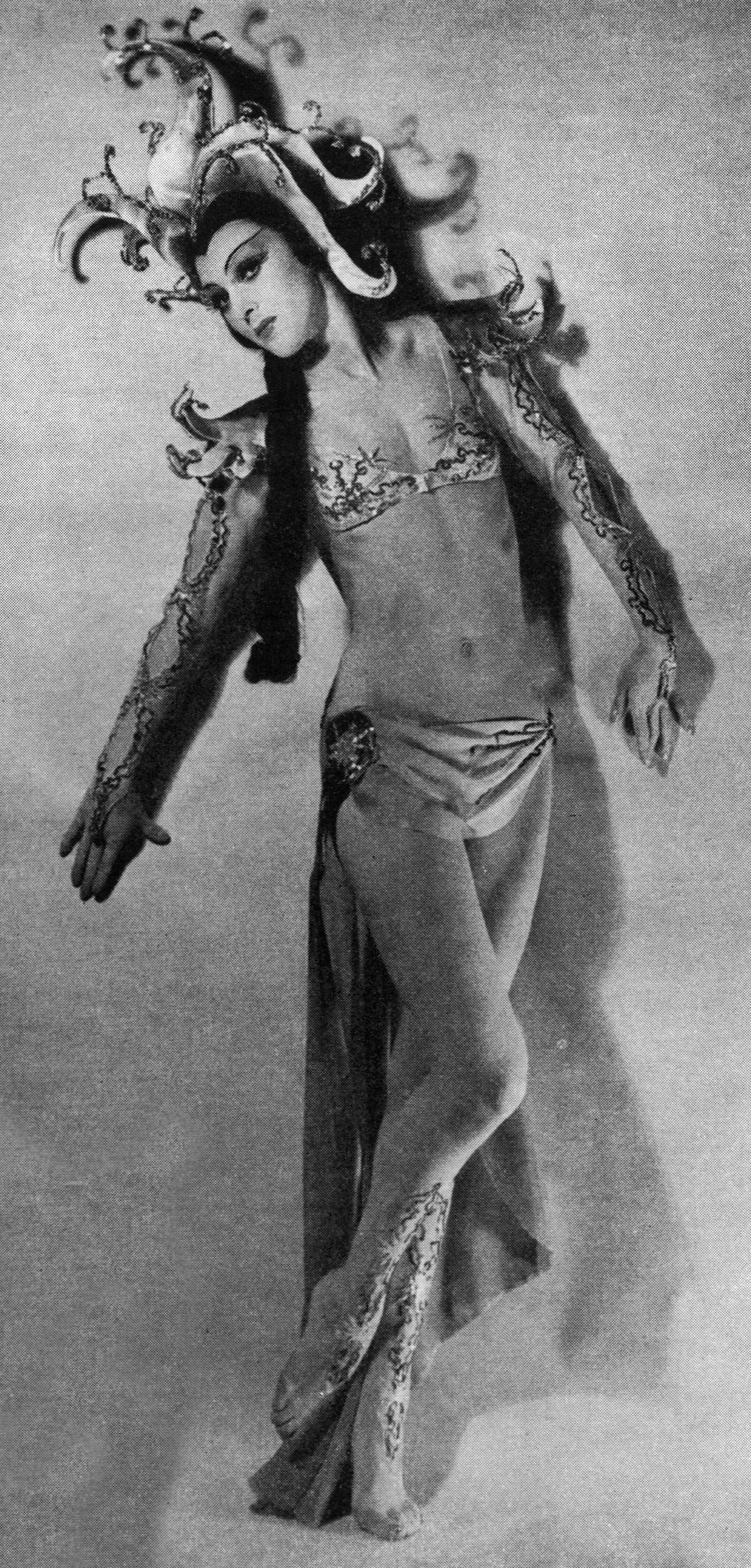
Thaïs 1940

- She Is the Only One (1926)
- His English Wife (1927)
- The Blue Mouse (1928)
- Artificial Svensson (1929)
- Love and Champagne (1930)
- Ulla, My Ulla (1930)
- Cavaliers of the Crown (1930)
- Tired Theodore (1931)
- Ship Ahoy! (1931)
- Kanske en gentleman (1935)
- Shipwrecked Max (1936)

== Bibliography ==
- Tommy Gustafsson. Masculinity in the Golden Age of Swedish Cinema: A Cultural Analysis of 1920s Films. McFarland, 2014.
