= Elisabeth Frisk =

Swedish actress

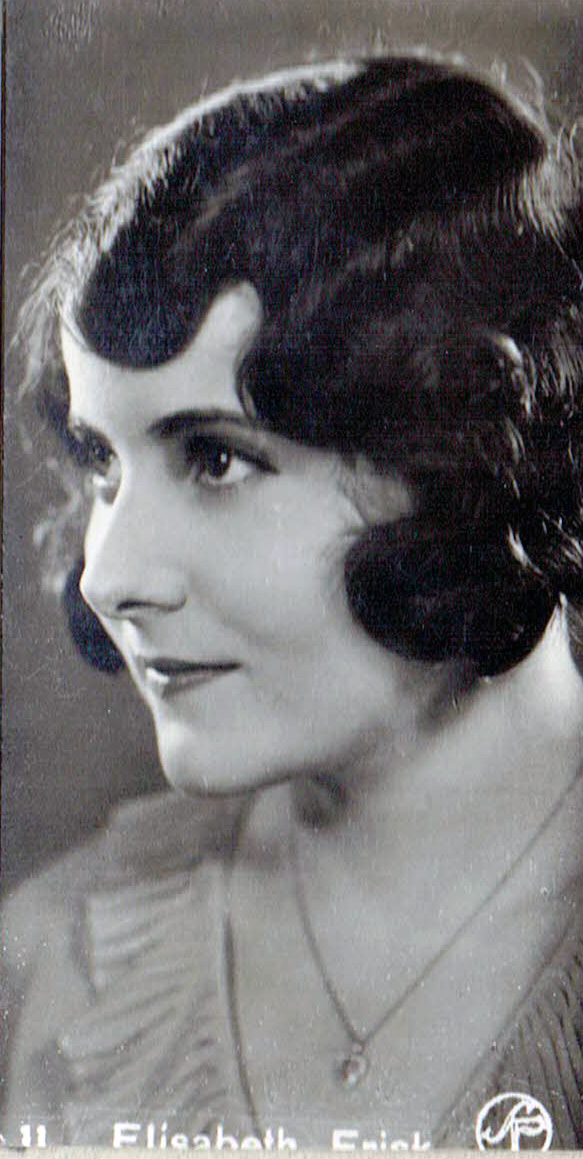
- Born: 24 October 1909; Hudiksvall, Sweden
- Died: 27 February 1986 (aged 76); Hallsberg, Sweden
- Occupation: Actress
- Years active: 1928–1934 (film)

Elisabeth Frisk (24 October 1909 – 27 February 1986) was a Swedish stage and film actress active in the 1920s and 1930s. She played the female lead in nine films from 1929 to 1934 during the early sound era.

== Filmography ==
- Parisiennes (1928)
- Say It with Music (1929)
- The People of Norrland (1930)
- Frida's Songs (1930)
- Dante's Mysteries (1931)
- Erämaan turvissa (1931)
- Half Way to Heaven (1931)
- Dangerous Paradise (1931)
- A Night of Love by the Öresund (1931)
- A Wedding Night at Stjarnehov (1934)

== Bibliography ==
- Goble, Alan. The Complete Index to Literary Sources in Film. Walter de Gruyter, 1999.
- Gustafsson, Tommy. Masculinity in the Golden Age of Swedish Cinema: A Cultural Analysis of 1920s Films. McFarland, 2014.
