= The Blue Mouse =

1928 film directed by Johannes Guter

- Directed by: Johannes Guter
- Written by: Robert Liebmann
- Produced by: Günther Stapenhorst
- Starring: Jenny Jugo; Harry Halm; Brita Appelgren
- Cinematography: Friedl Behn-Grund
- Production company: UFA
- Distributed by: UFA
- Release date: 16 November 1928
- Running time: 123 minutes
- Country: Germany
- Languages: Silent; German intertitles

The Blue Mouse (German: Die blaue Maus) is a 1928 German silent comedy film directed by Johannes Guter and starring Jenny Jugo, Harry Halm, and Brita Appelgren. The film was distributed in Britain by Gaumont in a sound version. While the sound version had no audible dialog, it was released with a synchronized musical score with sound effects using both the sound-on-disc and sound-on-film process. It was shot at the Babelsberg Studios in Potsdam. The film's sets were designed by the art director Jacek Rotmil.

== Cast ==
- Jenny Jugo as Fanchon Ravassol
- Harry Halm as Caesar Robin
- Brita Appelgren as Clarisse Mosquitier, seine Braut
- Julius Falkenstein as Vater Mosquitier
- Albert Paulig as Firmenpräsident Lebodier
- Hermine Sterler as Frau Lebodier
- Willi Forst as Rigault, Sekretär
- Rina Marsa as Frau Rigault
- Max Ehrlich as Auktionator E. A. Matthieu
- Ernst Behmer as Bürodiener
- Harry Grunwald

== Music ==
The sound version featured a theme song entitled “Fanchon Waltz” by Pat Heale (words) and Walter Collins (music).

== Bibliography ==
- Bock, Hans-Michael; Bergfelder, Tim, eds. (2009). The Concise Cinegraph: Encyclopaedia of German Cinema. New York: Berghahn Books. ISBN 978-1-57181-655-9.
