= Bengt Djurberg =

Swedish actor and singer (1898–1941)

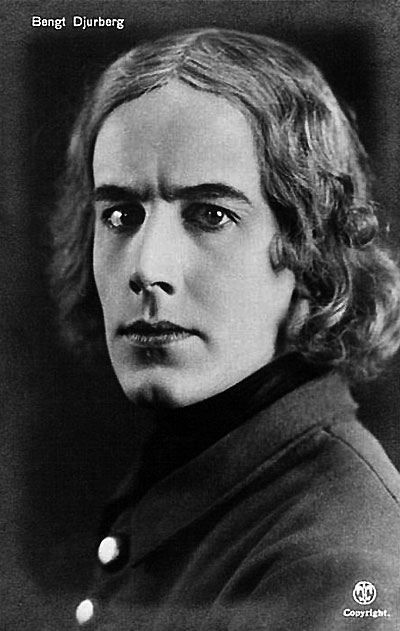
- Djurberg, c. 1925
- Born: 23 July 1898; Stockholm, Sweden
- Died: 2 November 1941 (aged 43); Stockholm, Sweden
- Occupations: Actor singer
- Years active: 1919–40

Bengt Djurberg (23 July 1898 – 2 November 1941) was a Swedish actor and singer. He appeared in about 25 roles in films from 1919 to 1940. His film debut was in Mauritz Stiller's film Sången om den eldröda blomman in 1919.

== Selected filmography ==
- Sången om den eldröda blomman (1919)
- Johan Ulfstjerna (1923)
- Ingmar's Inheritance (1925)
- Charles XII (1925)
- Ebberöds bank (1926)
- Troll-elgen (1927)
- Gustaf Wasa (1928)
- Cafe X (1928)
- The Triumph of the Heart (1929)
- Den starkaste (1929)
- Frida's Songs (1930)
- A Night of Love by the Öresund (1931)
- Skipper's Love (1931)
- Servant's Entrance (1932)
- Pojkarna på Storholmen (1932)
- Två man om en änka (1932)
- Boman's Boy (1933)
- Two Men and a Widow (1933)
- Ebberöds bank (1935)
- 33.333 (1936)
- Familjen som var en karusell (1936)
- Skicka hem nr. 7 (1937)
- John Ericsson, Victor of Hampton Roads (1937)
- Emilie Högquist (1939)
- Sjöcharmörer (1939)
- Mot nya tider (1939)
- Hanna in Society (1940)
- Kronans käcka gossar (1940)

== See also ==
- Cinema of Sweden
