= The People of Norrland =

1930 film

- Directed by: Theodor Berthels
- Written by: Greta Berthels
- Starring: Carl Barcklind; Elisabeth Frisk; Georg Blomstedt
- Cinematography: Adrian Bjurman
- Edited by: Adrian Bjurman
- Production company: Film AB Minerva
- Distributed by: AB Svensk Filmindustri
- Release date: 3 February 1930
- Running time: 89 minutes
- Country: Sweden
- Languages: Silent; Swedish intertitles

The People of Norrland (Swedish: Norrlänningar) is a 1930 Swedish silent drama film directed by Theodor Berthels, written by his wife Berthels, and starring Carl Barcklind, Elisabeth Frisk and Georg Blomstedt. It was shot at the Råsunda Studios in Stockholm. The film's sets were designed by the art director Vilhelm Bryde.

== Cast ==
- Carl Barcklind as Patron Berg
- Elisabeth Frisk as Annie Berg
- Georg Blomstedt as Carl Johan Edlund
- Hilda Borgström as Mrs. Edlund
- Harry Ahlin as Gunnar
- Stina Berg as Mamsell Mauritz
- Georg Skarstedt as Bertil Fågelberg
- Weyler Hildebrand as Langar-Simon
- Albin Jaenzon as Simon
- Joel Jansson as Erik
- Theodor Berthels as Läkaren
- Sickan Castegren as Telefonisten
- Edla Rothgardt as Kokerskan hos Berg

== Bibliography ==
- Nelmes, Jill & Selbo, Jule. Women Screenwriters: An International Guide. Palgrave Macmillan, 2015.
