= For Her Sake (1930 film) =

1930 film

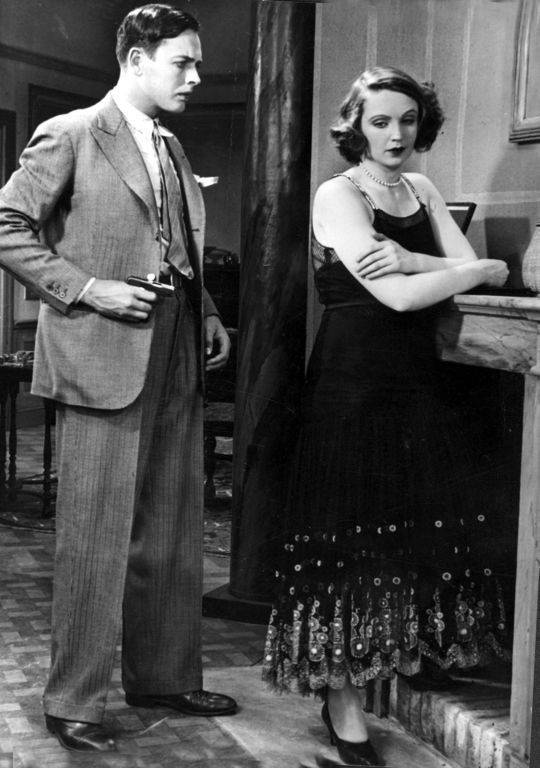
- Håkan Westergren and Inga Tidblad
- Directed by: Paul Merzbach
- Screenplay by: Paul Merzbach
- Produced by: Vilhelm Bryde
- Starring: Gösta Ekman; Inga Tidblad; Håkan Westergren; Stina Berg; Calle Hagman; Albert Ranft
- Cinematography: J. Julius
- Edited by: Paul Merzbach
- Music by: Jules Sylvain
- Distributed by: Film AB Minerva
- Release date: 11 August 1930 (Sweden)
- Running time: 101 minutes
- Country: Sweden
- Language: Swedish

For Her Sake (Swedish: För hennes skull) is a 1930 Swedish comedy film directed by Paul Merzbach. Starring is Gösta Ekman and Inga Tidblad. The film was the first Swedish sound film or "talkie" that was completely recorded in Sweden.

== Plot ==
For Her Sake (1930)

The young married couple Sigvard and Isabella Löfgren are constantly being sought by different companies where they are trading on the bill. Sigvard finds a new job as a traveling salesman while Isabella works as a secretary at a theatre agency seeking artists for a revue.

Gunnar Lanner, an artistic son of a fur dealer, goes to the theatre agency's office and tries to demand Isabella for money on her fur coat, as she has not made any payments on it for several months. But when Gunnar signs up in with Isabella, she instead thinks he is seeking a place in the revue, he therefore gets a number and is called in to the theatre managers office.

A little surprised, he accepts to sing, performs a song called "Isabell" and then wants to receive his money for the coat that Isabella owes him. When the theatre manager realises that there's a misunderstanding, he thinks it's fun and charming and wants to make a sketch of it all in the revue. Gunnar Lanner soon makes his stage debut, charmed and supported by Isabella, whose husband is away for his work.

== Cast ==
- Gösta Ekman as Gunnar Lanner
- Inga Tidblad as Isabella Löfgren, secretary at a theatre agency
- Håkan Westergren as Sigvard Löfgren, Isabella's husband and traveling salesman
- Stina Berg as Mrs. Lanner, Gunnar's mother and fur dealer
- Erik "Bullen" Berglund as C.W. Brown, American manager
- Calle Hagman as Carl Hagman, comedian
- Albert Ranft as theatre manager of the Nya Revyteatern
- Ragnar Arvedson - head of the theatre agency
- Torsten Winge - mind reader
- Ragnar Billberg - Jocke, soccer player and Sigvard's friend
- Ernst Fastbom - doctor
- Sven Jerring - radio host
- Nils Ericson - revue artist
