= His Excellency (1944 film) =

1944 film

- Directed by: Hasse Ekman
- Written by: Bertil Malmberg; Sven Stolpe
- Based on: His Excellency by Bertil Malmberg
- Produced by: Lorens Marmstedt
- Starring: Lars Hanson; Gunnar Sjöberg; Elsie Albiin
- Cinematography: Martin Bodin; Hilding Bladh
- Edited by: Lennart Wallén; Rolf Husberg
- Music by: Lars-Erik Larsson
- Production company: Terrafilm
- Distributed by: Terrafilm
- Release date: 3 March 1944
- Running time: 101 minutes
- Country: Sweden
- Language: Swedish

His Excellency (Swedish: Excellensen) is a 1944 Swedish drama film directed by Hasse Ekman and starring Lars Hanson, Gunnar Sjöberg and Elsie Albiin. It was made at the Råsunda Studios in Stockholm. The film's sets were designed by the art director Arne Åkermark. It is based on a 1942 play of the same title by Bertil Malmberg. It was part of a growing number of Swedish films more overtly critical of German war policy, and the only one of them to openly identify the occupiers as Germans and set it in a real country.

== Plot ==
A celebrated Austrian poet strongly opposes Nazism, meanwhile his daughter falls in love with a leading Nazi who becomes commander over the concentration camp where his Excellency later is imprisoned.

== Cast ==
- Lars Hanson as His Excellency Herbert von Blankenau
- Gunnar Sjöberg as Captain Max Karbe
- Elsie Albiin as Elisabeth von Blankenau, his Excellency daughter
- Stig Järrel as maj. Monk
- Hugo Björne as father Ignatius
- Tord Stål as Dr. Amann
- Sven Magnusson as Wilhelm
- Hampe Faustman as Warder
- Håkan Westergren as Police Officer
- Carl Ström as Josef
- Magnus Kesster as Dr. Blumenreich
- Torsten Hillberg as Colonel
- Sigge Fürst as Kubelik
- Ivar Kåge as Marshal of the Court
- Sven Bergvall as President of Poet's Academy

== Bibliography ==
- Iverson, Gunnar, Soderbergh Widding, Astrid & Soila, Tytti. Nordic National Cinemas. Routledge, 2005.
- Qvist, Per Olov & von Bagh, Peter. Guide to the Cinema of Sweden and Finland. Greenwood Publishing Group, 2000.
- Wright, Rochelle. The Visible Wall: Jews and Other Ethnic Outsiders in Swedish Film. SIU Press, 1998.
