= Sealed Lips (1927 film) =

1927 film

- Directed by: Gustaf Molander
- Written by: Paul Merzbach
- Produced by: Oscar Hemberg
- Starring: Mona Mårtenson; Fred Louis Lerch; Sandra Milovanoff
- Cinematography: Julius Jaenzon
- Production company: Isepa
- Release date: 3 October 1927
- Running time: 91 minutes
- Country: Sweden
- Languages: Silent; Swedish intertitles

Sealed Lips (Swedish: Förseglade läppar) is a 1927 Swedish silent drama film directed by Gustaf Molander and starring Mona Mårtenson, Fred Louis Lerch and Sandra Milovanoff. It was shot at the Råsunda Studios in Stockholm and on location at Lake Como and Feltre in Italy.The film's sets were designed by the art director Vilhelm Bryde. French actress Geneviève Cargèse was originally cast in the lead role but had to drop out due to illness.

== Cast ==
- Mona Mårtenson as Angela
- Fred Louis Lerch as Frank Wood
- Sandra Milovanoff as Marian Wood
- Stina Berg as Sister Scolastica
- Edvin Adolphson as Giambastista
- Karin Swanström as Aunt Peppina
- Josua Bengtson as Train Passenger
- Erik 'Bullen' Berglund as Train Conductor
- Gösta Gustafson as Train Passenger
- Wanda Rothgardt as Novice
- Tekla Sjöblom as Nun
- John Melin as Man at the inn

== Bibliography ==
- Gustafsson, Tommy . Masculinity in the Golden Age of Swedish Cinema: A Cultural Analysis of 1920s Films. McFarland, 2014.
