= Half Way to Heaven (1931 film) =

1931 film

- Directed by: Rune Carlsten; Stellan Windrow
- Based on: Here Comes the Bandwagon by Henry Leyford Gates
- Starring: Elisabeth Frisk; Edvin Adolphson; Karin Swanström
- Production company: Les Studios Paramount
- Distributed by: Film AB Paramount
- Release date: 26 December 1931
- Running time: 77 minutes
- Countries: Sweden; United States
- Language: Swedish

Half Way to Heaven (Swedish: Halvvägs till himlen) is a 1931 drama film directed by Rune Carlsten and Stellan Windrow and starring Elisabeth Frisk, Edvin Adolphson and Karin Swanström. It was produced and distributed by the Swedish subsidiary of Paramount Pictures at the company's Joinville Studios. It was one of a large number of multiple-language versions shot at Joinville during the early years of the sound era. It is a Swedish-language remake of the 1929 Hollywood film of the same title.

== Cast ==
- Elisabeth Frisk as Mona
- Haakon Hjelde as Ned Lee
- Edvin Adolphson as Nick Pogli
- Karin Swanström as Madame Jenny
- Torben Meyer as Director
- Einar Sissener as Jack
- Mildred Mehle

== Bibliography ==
- Waldman, Harry. Missing Reels: Lost Films of American and European Cinema. McFarland, 2000.
- Wredlund, Bertil & Lindfors, Rolf. Långfilm i Sverige: 1930-1939. Proprius, 1983.
