= Sven Stolpe =

Swedish writer, translator, journalist, literary scholar and critic (1905–1996)

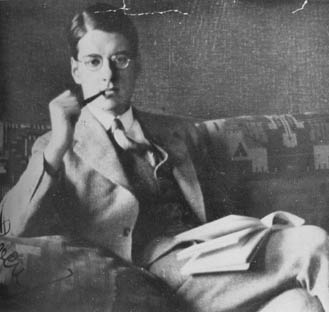
- Sven Stolpe in 1929
- Born: 24 August 1905; Katarina Parish
- Died: 26 August 1996; Filipstad church parish
- Occupations: Journalist, translator, writer, literary scholar
- Spouse: Karin Stolpe
- Children: Monica Rennerfelt

Sven Stolpe (24 August 1905 – 26 August 1996) was a Swedish writer, translator, journalist, literary scholar and critic, who was active in Swedish literary and intellectual discussion for most of his life.

In the early 1930s, he argued for internationalism and against aestheticism, but he was also part of the Oxford Group which claimed the necessity of "moral and spiritual re-armament" and later in life, in 1947, he became a Catholic. Among his literary production is a 1959 dissertation on Queen Christina of Sweden, who abdicated as a result of her own conversion to Catholicism.

In 1984, the Belgian biographer Joris Taels published a biography of Stolpe.

== Private life ==
His brother was Herman Stolpe.

He is buried in Vadstena cemetery.

== Bibliography ==
- Två generationer, Stockholm, 1929
- I dödens väntrum, 1930
- Livsdyrkare: studier i modern primitivism, Stockholm, 1931
- Together with Ernst Robert Curtius: Den franska kulturen : en orientering, Stockholm, 1932
- Sigfrid Siwertz, Stockholm, 1933
- Hjalmar Söderberg, Stockholm, 1934
- Kristna falangen, 1934
- Diktens frihet, Stockholm, 1935
- Det svenska geniet och andra studier, Stockholm, 1935
- Kristna falangen: franska essäer. Ny samling, 1936
- Oxfordprofiler, Stockholm, 1938
- I smältdegeln: Inlägg och skisser, 1941
- Fem norrmän: Christopher Bruun, Eivind Berggrav, Arne Fjellbu, Ronald Fangen, Fredrik Ramm, Stockholm, 1942
- General von Döbeln 1942 (screenplay)
- Imprisoned Women 1943 (screenplay)
- En dag skall gry 1944 (screenplay)
- His Excellency 1944 (screenplay)
- We Need Each Other 1944 (screenplay)
- Crime and Punishment 1945 (screenplay)
- Francois Mauriac och andra essayer, 1947
- Lätt, snabb och öm, 1947
- Änglar och demoner: karikatyrer och skisser, Stockholm, 1948
- Den glömda vägen, Stockholm, 1949
- Stefan George och andra studier, Stockholm, 1956
- Ungdom, Uppsala, 1957
- Student -23, Uppsala, 1958
- Från stoicism till mystik: studier i drottning Kristinas maximer, Stockholm, 1959
- Drottning Kristina, Stockholm, 1960-1961
- Klara: komedi i fem akter, 1962
- I dödens skugga 1962
- Tre franska författare: essäer om André Gide, François Mauriac, Georges Bernanos, Stockholm, 1963
- Dag Hammarskjölds andliga väg, Stockholm, 1964
- Låt mig berätta, Stockholm, 1970
- Låt mig berätta mer, minnen och anekdoter', Stockholm, 1971
- Svenska folkets litteraturhistoria, Stockholm, 1972
- Memoarer, Stockholm, 1974-1976
- Geijer : en essay, Stockholm, 1976
- Birgitta i Sverige och i Rom, Stockholm
- Tål ni höra mer? : minnen och anekdoter, Stockholm, 1976
- Olof Lagercrantz, Stockholm, 1980
- 40 svenska författare, Höganäs, 1980
- Livets löjen: glada minnen och bagateller, Stockholm, 1983
- Nikolaj Berdjajev, Borås, 1983
- Äventyr i Paris - och annorstädes : essayer av Sven Stolpe 1934-1974, Höganäs, 1984
- Mitt Värmland, Solna, 1985
- Jeanne d'Arc: en biografi, Höganäs, 1988
- Franciskus: lärjunge och diktare, Borås, 1988
- Tal till vänner, Borås, 1990
