= The Girl in Tails =

The Girl in Tails may refer to:

- The Girl in Tails (1926 film), Swedish silent film
- The Girl in Tails (1956 film), Swedish film
