= Gösta Bredefeldt =

Swedish actor (1935–2010)

- Born: 19 December 1935; Gothenburg, Sweden
- Died: 9 January 2010 (aged 74); Stockholm, Sweden
- Occupation: Actor
- Years active: 1961–2009

Gösta Johan Harwey Bredefeldt (19 December 1935 – 9 January 2010) was a Swedish actor. He appeared in more than 60 films and television shows between 1961 and 2009. Bredefeldt starred in the 1974 film A Handful of Love, which was entered into the 24th Berlin International Film Festival.

== Filmography ==
Year	Title	Role	Notes
1969	Made in Sweden	Party guest	
1970	Den magiska cirkeln	Göte Persson	
1971	Troll		
1972	Ture Sventon - Privatdetektiv	Herr Omar	
1974	A Handful of Love	Daniel Severin Larsson	
1975	Ungkarlshotellet	Sven	
1975	The White Wall	Mona's Father	
1976	Drömmen om Amerika	Policeman	
1978	Men Can't Be Raped	Martin Wester	
1979	Den nya människan	Börjes jobbarkompis	
1986	Den frusna leoparden	Ottosson	
1991	'Harry Lund' lägger näsan i blöt!	Olle	
1993	Tryggare kan ingen vara...	Ingemar	
1993	The Man on the Balcony	Lodaren	
1994	Sommarmord	'Farsan' Sandberg	
1994	Pillertrillaren	David's Father	
1995	Jönssonligans största kupp	Burak	
1999	Sjön	Olsson, police inspector	
1999	En liten julsaga	Morfar Hugo	
2006	Moreno & tystnaden	Mathias Hauptman	
2006	Keillers park	Juris	
2006	Wellkåmm to Verona	Viktor	
2009	The Girl with the Dragon Tattoo	Harald Vanger	
