= The Invisible Wall (1944 film) =

1944 film

- Directed by: Gustaf Molander
- Written by: Edwin Martin; Gösta Stevens
- Based on: Assassination in Paris by Marika Stiernstedt
- Starring: Inga Tidblad; Irma Christenson; Karl-Arne Holmsten
- Cinematography: Åke Dahlqvist
- Edited by: Oscar Rosander
- Music by: Lars-Erik Larsson
- Production company: Svensk Filmindustri
- Distributed by: Svensk Filmindustri
- Release date: 21 August 1944
- Running time: 105 minutes
- Country: Sweden
- Language: Swedish

The Invisible Wall (Swedish: Den osynliga muren) is a 1944 Swedish war drama film directed by Gustaf Molander and starring Inga Tidblad, Irma Christenson and Karl-Arne Holmsten. It was made at the Råsunda Studios in Stockholm with location shooting around Kävlinge in Scania. The film's sets were designed by the art director Arne Åkermark. It is based on the 1942 novel Assassination in Paris (Attentat i Paris) by Marika Stiernstedt. It was part of a group of films that dealt with the ongoing theme of the German occupation of Norway and Denmark while being set in a notionally unnamed country.

== Synopsis ==
A young woman working in a travel agency is in a relationship with an officer of the forces occupying her country. However, she also has a friend who is part of a clandestine resistance movement that help smuggle people out of the country who are wanted by the authorities. She becomes involved in this movement, helping Jews and a young woman who killed one of the occupiers and is now being hunted down by them.

== Cast ==
- Inga Tidblad as Lina Boyd
- Irma Christenson as Marie de Troy
- Karl-Arne Holmsten as Stefan Becker
- Erik Hell as Walter Corell
- Stig Järrel as Victor Reis
- Håkan Westergren as Paul Brandt
- Olof Winnerstrand as Prof. Ruben
- Hilda Borgström as Mrs. Meijer
- Carl Ström as Brandt Sr.
- Alf Kjellin as Ivan Levy
- Inge Wærn as Mirjam Levy
- Hampe Faustman as Patrol Commander
- Hugo Björne as Maj. Wolter
- Britta Brunius as Mrs. Fock
- Rune Carlsten as Interrogator

== Bibliography ==
- Iverson, Gunnar, Soderbergh Widding, Astrid & Soila, Tytti. Nordic National Cinemas. Routledge, 2005.
- Qvist, Per Olov & von Bagh, Peter. Guide to the Cinema of Sweden and Finland. Greenwood Publishing Group, 2000.
- Wright, Rochelle. The Visible Wall: Jews and Other Ethnic Outsiders in Swedish Film. SIU Press, 1998.
