= Gideon Wahlberg =

Swedish actor

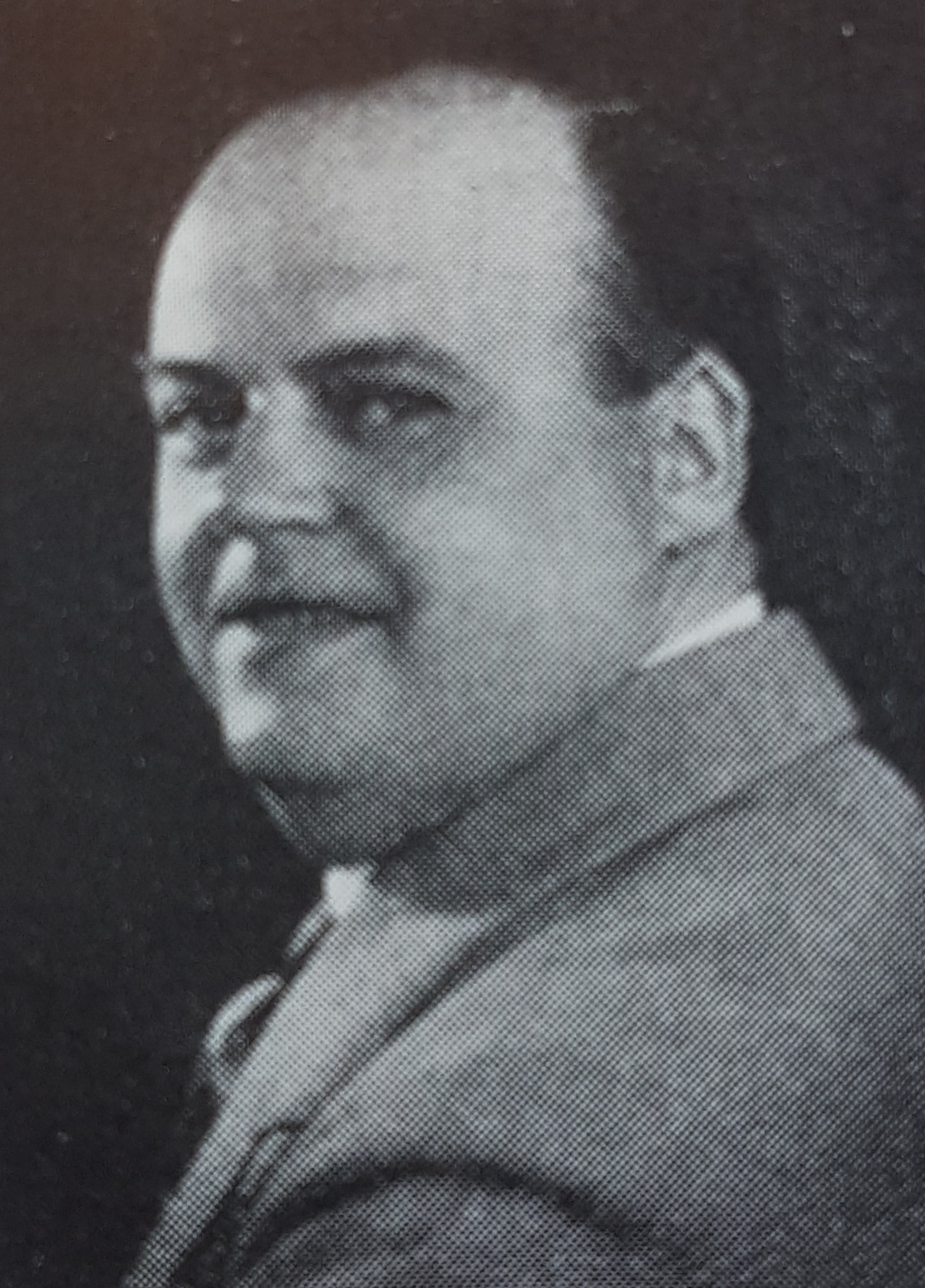
- Gideon Wahlberg.
- Born: 18 June 1890; Stockholm, Sweden
- Died: 3 May 1948 (aged 57); Stockholm, Sweden
- Occupations: Actor, writer, director
- Years active: 1920–48 (film)

Gideon Wahlberg (18 June 1890 – 3 May 1948) was a Swedish actor, screenwriter, film director and theater manager. Wahlberg directed six films including South of the Highway (1936).

Wahlberg was the theater manager of the Arbisteatern in Norrköping from 1918–1931 and 1933–1934.

== Biography ==
Wahlberg was the son of a tailor and grew up with several siblings in Östermalm in Stockholm. He made his stage debut as a 15-year-old and was director of the Arbisteatern in Norrköping 1918-1931 and 1933-1934. He wrote about 25 comedies, several of them were filmed or became TV series the most famous is Söderkåkar. Between 1924 and 1947, nineteen of his plays were performed at Tantolunden's open-air theater, where he was director together with Thyra Janse-Juberg from 1933 to 1948. Wahlberg also wrote lyrics and melodies for Ernst Rolf's revues.

Gideon Wahlberg was married twice, the first time to the actress Aida Leipziger, the stepdaughter of the revue writer Harald Leipziger, and the second time to the actress Lilly Föll. With Aida he had a son Herbert in 1912, Gulldis in 1919 and Ingalill in 1928. In his marriage to Lilly he had a son Anders.

Walhlberg founded the fraternity Thalia's Friends in Norrköping in 1922, and was called "Norrköping's Shakespeare". He is buried in Norra kyrkogården in Norrköping.

== Selected filmography ==
=== Actor ===
- Carolina Rediviva (1920) - Student
- Janne Modig (1923) - Friman
- The Devil and the Smalander (1927) - Navvy
- Kärlek och landstorm (1931) - Filip Andersson
- Ett skepp kommer lastat (1932) - Show Artiste
- The Southsiders (1932) - Johan Jansson
- Två hjärtan och en skuta (1932) - Napoleon Svensson
- Saturday Nights (1933) - Johan
- Flickorna från Gamla sta'n (1934) - Johan Wellberg
- The Women Around Larsson (1934) - Johan Jansson
- Close Relations (1935) - Johan Jansson
- Larsson i andra giftet (1935) - Johan Kindberg
- Skärgårdsflirt (1935) - Österman
- Flickor på fabrik (1935) - Larsson
- Skicka hem Nr. 7 (1937) - Guest at the major's 70th birthday (uncredited)
- Vi som går scenvägen (1938) - Johan
- Romans (1940) - Karlsson
- The Ghost Reporter (1941) - Night Editor
- Lasse-Maja (1941) - Inn Keeper
- Sexlingar (1942) - Screenwriter (uncredited)
- Adventurer (1942) - Inn-keeper (uncredited)
- Elvira Madigan (1943) - Member of Circus Orchestra (uncredited)
- In Darkest Smaland (1943) - Policeman
- Sonja (1943) - Lindgren's Fellow-worker (uncredited)
- Försök inte med mej..! (1946) - Farmer (uncredited)
- Saltstänk och krutgubbar (1946) - Parish Constable (final film role)

=== Director ===
- South of the Highway (1936)
- Baldwin's Wedding (1938)

== Bibliography ==
- Larsson, Mariah & Marklund, Anders. Swedish Film: An Introduction and Reader. Nordic Academic Press, 2010.
