= A Night of Love by the Öresund =

1931 film

- Directed by: Sölve Cederstrand; Ragnar Widestedt
- Written by: Sölve Cederstrand; Torsten Lundqvist
- Starring: Erik Berglund; Elisabeth Frisk; Theodor Berthels
- Cinematography: Hilmer Ekdahl
- Production company: Svensk Ljudfilm
- Distributed by: Svea Film
- Release date: 18 November 1931
- Running time: 106 minutes
- Country: Sweden
- Language: Swedish

A Night of Love by the Öresund (Swedish: En kärleksnatt vid Öresund) is a 1931 Swedish comedy film directed by Sölve Cederstrand and Ragnar Widestedt and starring Erik Berglund, Elisabeth Frisk and Theodor Berthels. Cederstrand also co-wrote the script. The film was a success at the box office.

== Cast ==
- Erik Berglund as Johansson
- Elisabeth Frisk as Maud Olsson
- Theodor Berthels as Charlie Ohlson
- Bengt Djurberg as Gunnar Ohlson
- Maritta Marke as Viola Wall
- Ragnar Widestedt as Julius Hagenberg
- Hugo Björne as Dr. Forsmark
- Eric Abrahamsson as Magazine editor
- Carl Deurell as Jakob Nobelius
- Einar Fagstad as Man on Hagenberg's yacht
- Mathias Taube as Doctor
- Gösta Bodin as Steward
- Gösta Ericsson as Man in dream
- Georg Fernqvist as Dr. Kramer
- Hartwig Fock as Porter
- Wictor Hagman as Cashier
- Hugo Jacobsson as Hagenberg's friend
- Georg Skarstedt as Krusoff - Man in dream

== Bibliography ==
- Larsson, Mariah & Marklund, Anders. Swedish Film: An Introduction and Reader. Nordic Academic Press, 2010.
