= Albert Ranft =

Swedish theatre director and actor (1858–1938)

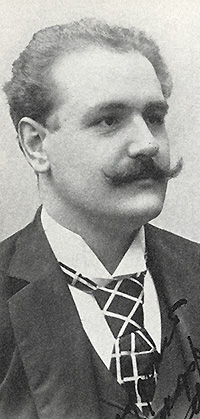
- Born: 23 November 1858; Jakob and Johannes parish
- Died: 5 October 1938 (aged 79); Sankt Matteus
- Resting place: Norra begravningsplatsen
- Occupation: Actor, theatre director, theater manager

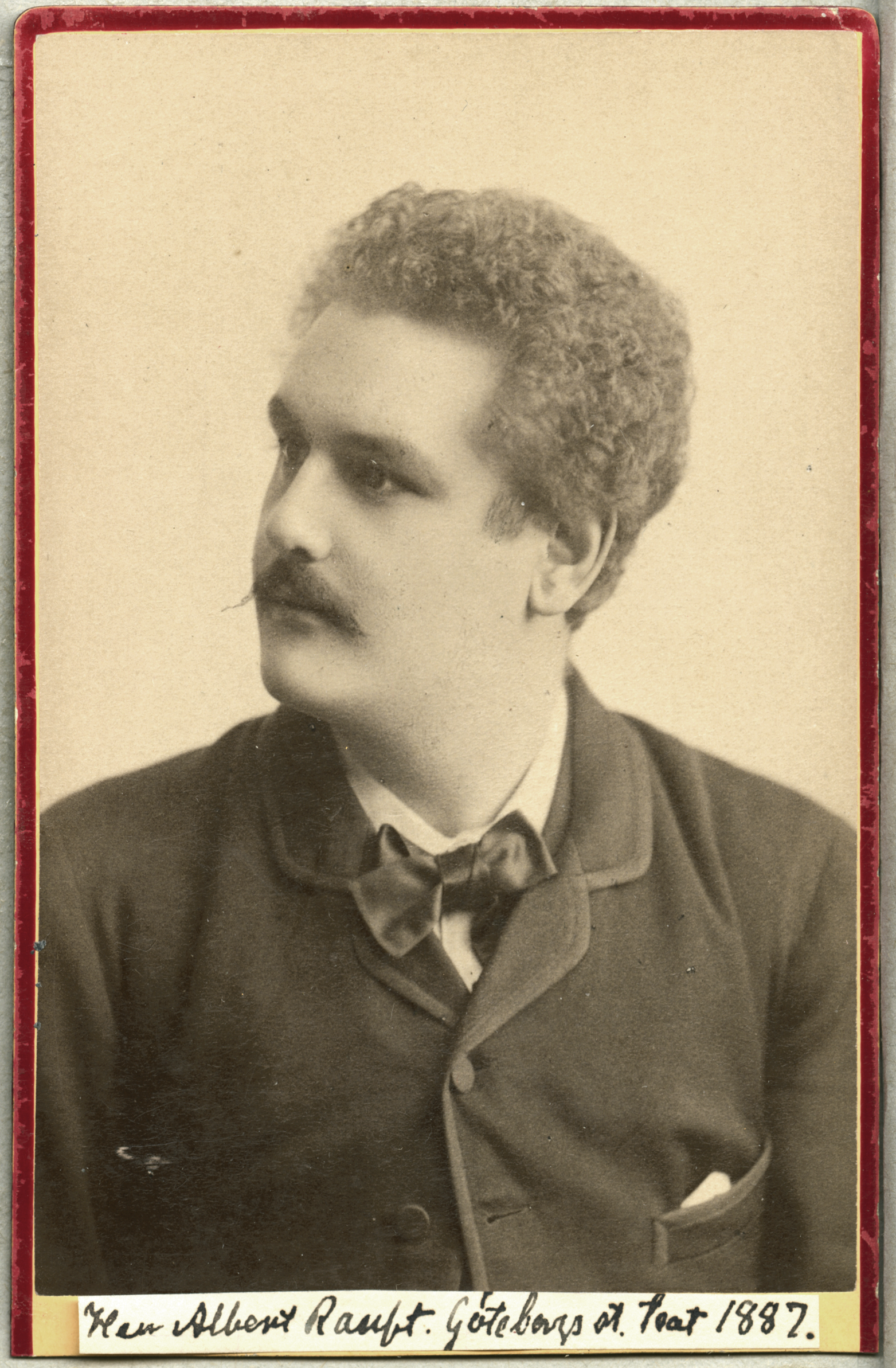
Albert Ranft, 1887

Albert Adam Ranft (23 November 1858 – 5 October 1938) was a Swedish theatre director and actor.

== Biography ==
Albert Adam Ranft was born in Stockholm, the son of Adolf Fredrik Ranft and Katarina Amalia Reijhell. His brother Gustaf Adolf Ranft (1856–1929) was also an actor.

Ranft debuted in the theatre company of Danish actress Magda von Dolcke (1838–1926) in Örebro during 1876.

He was involved in various amusing theater companies until 1884 when he started his own travelling company. Ranft was engaged from 1886 to 1890 as director and actor at Stora Teatern in Gothenburg and with Hjalmar Selander (1859–1928) in 1890–1892. He ran a traveling theater company from 1892 to 1893. In 1892, he took over ownership of Stora Teatern. In 1895, Ranft took over the Vasateatern in Stockholm.

Ranft was regarded as the "theatre emperor of Stockholm" in the early 20th century. For a while his empire comprised all the private playhouses in the city: Vasateatern, the Swedish Theatre, Södra Teatern, and Oscarsteatern. Simultaneously, he ran the Royal Swedish Opera. The jewel in his crown was the Swedish Theatre, where several plays that have made theatre history premiered, notably A Dream Play by August Strindberg in 1907.

== Personal life ==
In 1878 he was married to actress Alma Helin (1854–1881) and from 1893 with actress Lisa Ranft (1876–1941) with whom he had the children operetta singer Kajsa Ranft (1894-1963) and actor Nils Ranft (1896–1974). Albert Ranft died in Stockholm and was buried at Norra begravningsplatsen.

== Selected filmography ==
- A Perfect Gentleman (1927)
- For Her Sake (1930)
