= Harry Ahlin =

Swedish film actor (1900–1969)

- Born: 14 April 1900; Sundsvall, Sweden
- Died: 31 July 1969 (aged 69); Gothenburg, Sweden
- Occupation: Actor
- Years active: 1919-1969

Harry Ahlin (14 April 1900 – 31 July 1969) was a Swedish film actor. He appeared in 60 films between 1919 and 1969. He is also the father of actress Margita Ahlin and grandfather of actor/television producer Anton Glanzelius.

== Selected filmography ==
- Ingmar's Inheritance (1925)
- The Triumph of the Heart (1929)
- Frida's Songs (1930)
- The People of Norrland (1930)
- Tired Theodore (1931)
- The Dangerous Game (1933)
- Boman's Boy (1933)
- The Yellow Clinic (1942)
- Young Blood (1943)
- Katrina (1943)
- She Thought It Was Him (1943)
- Blizzard (1944)
- We Need Each Other (1944)
- Black Roses (1945)
- The Bells of the Old Town (1946)
- Dynamite (1947)
- Neglected by His Wife (1947)
- Port of Call (1948)
- The Swedish Horseman (1949)
- Realm of Man (1949)
- In the Arms of the Sea (1951)
- Skipper in Stormy Weather (1951)
- Customs Officer Bom (1951)
- Blondie, Beef and the Banana (1952)
- Young Summer (1954)
- Flicka i kasern (1955)
- The Light from Lund (1955)
- Paradise (1955)
- When the Mills are Running (1956)
- Rififi in Stockholm (1961)
- The Shot (1969)
