= Baldwin's Wedding =

1938 film

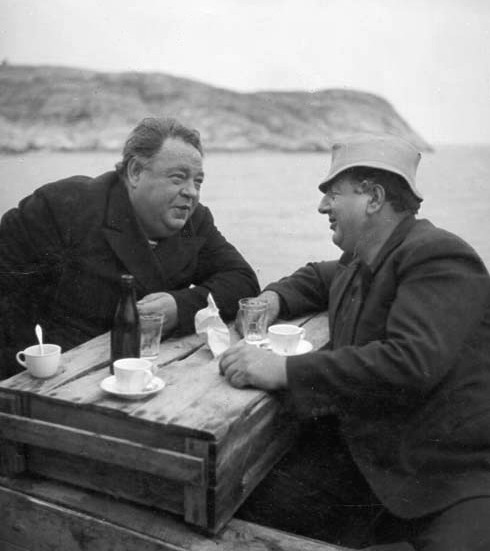
- Directed by: Emil A. Lingheim; Gideon Wahlberg
- Written by: Edvard Persson; Gideon Wahlberg
- Starring: Edvard Persson; Arthur Fischer; Bullan Weijden
- Edited by: Emil A. Lingheim
- Music by: Erik Baumann
- Distributed by: Europafilm
- Release date: 1938
- Running time: 105 minutes
- Country: Sweden
- Language: Swedish

Baldwin's Wedding (Swedish: Baldevins bröllop) is a 1938 Swedish comedy film. The film was written by Edvard Persson and Gideon Wahlberg and directed by Emil A. Lingheim and Gideon Wahlberg.

== Plot ==
The film is about the dockworker Baldevin.

== Cast ==
- Edvard Persson – Baldevin
- Arthur Fischer – Sörensen
- Bullan Weijden – Ms. Sörensen
- Dagmar Ebbesen – Ms. Lisa Westman
- Björn Berglund – Johan
- John Ekman – Johnsson
- Elsa Sundgren – Astrid (Johnsson's daughter)
- Lisskulla Jobs – Sofi (Johnsson's maid)
- Tom Walter – Karlsson
- Alma Bodén
- Allan Waldner
