= A Wedding Night at Stjarnehov =

1934 film

- Directed by: Torsten Lundqvist
- Written by: Torsten Lundqvist
- Starring: Adolf Jahr; Elisabeth Frisk; Ruth Stevens
- Cinematography: Sven Bardach
- Music by: Jules Sylvain
- Production company: Svensk Talfilm
- Distributed by: AB Stockholms Filmcentral
- Release date: 26 December 1934
- Running time: 82 minutes
- Country: Sweden
- Language: Swedish

A Wedding Night at Stjarnehov (Swedish: En bröllopsnatt på Stjärnehov) is a 1934 Swedish comedy film directed by Torsten Lundqvist and starring Adolf Jahr, Elisabeth Frisk and Ruth Stevens. It was shot at the Kungsholmen Studios of Nordisk Tonefilm in Stockholm and on location around Södertälje and Trosa. The film's sets were designed by the art director Bertil Duroj. It is now considered to be a lost film.

== Synopsis ==
In order to save his family estate Bertil Stiernhielm, son of a count, marries Britta Magnusson the daughter of a sausage millionaire. However he has grave doubts about whether this is consistent with his family honour. Meanwhile his twin brother Casimir returns from serving in the Swedish navy and is mistaken by Britta for Bertil.

== Cast ==
- Adolf Jahr as Bertil Stiernhielm/Casimir Stiernhielm
- Elisabeth Frisk as Britta Magnusson
- Ruth Stevens as Marianne
- Olof Sandborg as Count Stiernhielm
- Lili Ziedner as Augusta Stiernhielm
- Eric Gustafson as Magnusson
- Jullan Jonsson as Mrs. Magnusson
- Nils Wahlbom as Jean

== Bibliography ==
- Freiburg, Jeanne Ellen. Regulatory Bodies: Gendered Visions of the State in German and Swedish Cinema. University of Minnesota, 1994.
