= Elsie Albiin =

Swedish actress (1921–2009)

- Born: Elsie Albiin; 17 December 1921; Helsingborg, Sweden
- Died: 3 April 2009 (aged 87); Denmark
- Occupation: Actress

Elsie Albiin (17 December 1921 – 3 April 2009) was a Swedish actress born in Helsingborg. She appeared in several films, including 1953's Intimate Relations. She was a widow for the last eleven years of her life. Her husband was Tony Ford. She lived in Lyngby, close to her children's family.

== Selected filmography ==
- Med dej i mina armar (1940)
- Fransson the Terrible (1941)
- Lärarinna på vift (1941)
- Nothing Is Forgotten (1942)
- Lyckan kommer (1942)
- Sonja (1943)
- Imprisoned Women (1943)
- His Excellency (1944)
- En dag skall gry (1944)
- Fram för lilla Märta (1945)
- Crime and Punishment (1945)
- The Bells of the Old Town (1946)
- Harald the Stalwart (1946)
- Incorrigible (1946)
- Rapture (1950)
- The Nuthouse (1951)
- The Long Search (1952) (UK: Memory of Love)
- Intimate Relations (1953)
- 36 Hours (US: Terror Street) (1953)
- What Every Woman Wants (1954)
- Hidden Fear (1957)
