= Lisskulla Jobs =

Swedish actress (1906–1996)

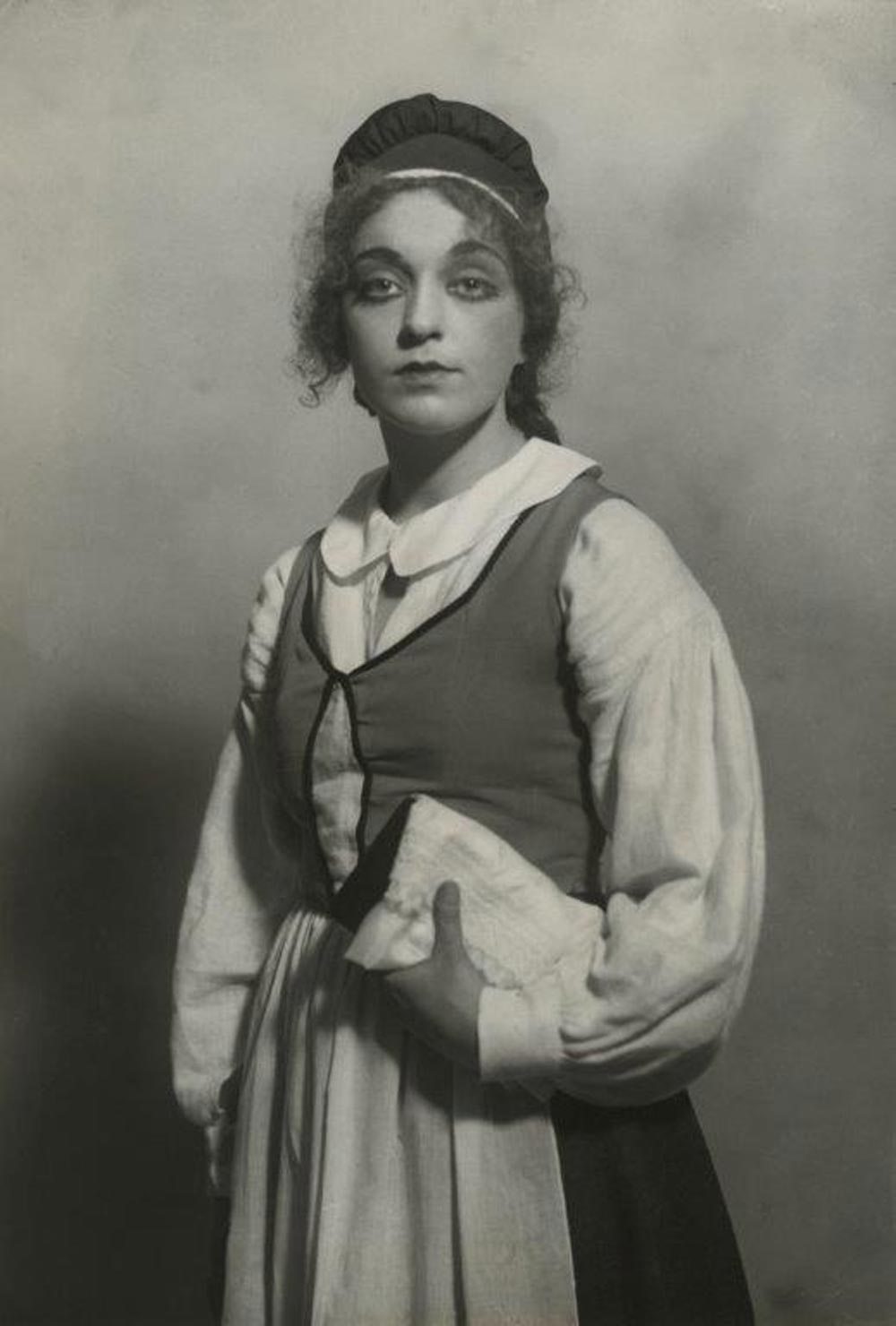
- Lisskulla Jobs in a 1927 production of Peer Gynt
- Born: Karin Helfrid Berglund; 25 June 1906; Leksand, Sweden
- Died: 15 August 1996 (aged 90); Leksand, Sweden
- Occupation: Actress
- Years active: 1925-1990

Lisskulla Jobs (born Karin Helfrid Berglund; 25 June 1906 – 15 August 1996) was a Swedish stage and film actress. She appeared in more than 30 films between 1925 and 1990.

== Selected filmography ==
- Ingmar's Inheritance (1925)
- The Lady of the Camellias (1925)
- The Triumph of the Heart (1929)
- Baldwin's Wedding (1938)
- The Heavenly Play (1942)
- The Sin of Anna Lans (1943)
- Kungsgatan (1943)
- Crime and Punishment (1945)
- Motherhood (1945)
- Widower Jarl (1945)
- Two Stories Up (1950)
