= Dangerous Paradise (1931 film) =

1931 film

- Directed by: Rune Carlsten
- Based on: Victory by Joseph Conrad
- Starring: Elisabeth Frisk; Ragnar Arvedson
- Production company: Les Studios Paramount
- Distributed by: Film AB Paramount
- Release date: 3 October 1931
- Running time: 72 minutes
- Countries: Sweden; United States
- Language: Swedish

Dangerous Paradise (Swedish: Farornas paradis) is a 1931 drama film directed by Rune Carlsten and starring Elisabeth Frisk and Ragnar Arvedson. It is now considered a lost film. It was produced and distributed by the Swedish subsidiary of Paramount Pictures at the company's Joinville Studios. It was one of a large number of multiple-language versions shot at Joinville during the early years of the sound era. It is a Swedish-language remake of the Hollywood film Dangerous Paradise based on the 1915 novel Victory by Joseph Conrad.

== Cast ==
- Elisabeth Frisk as Anita
- Ragnar Arvedson as Mr. Jones
- Knut Martin as Davis
- Oscar Textorius as Mr. Schomberg
- Nils Leander as Ricardo

== Bibliography ==
- Goble, Alan. The Complete Index to Literary Sources in Film. Walter de Gruyter, 1999.
- Moore, Gene M. Conrad on Film. Cambridge University Press, 2006.
- Wredlund, Bertil & Lindfors, Rolf. Långfilm i Sverige: 1930-1939. Proprius, 1983.
