= A Handful of Love (film) =

1974 film

- Directed by: Vilgot Sjöman
- Written by: Vilgot Sjöman
- Produced by: Bengt Forslund
- Starring: Anita Ekström; Gösta Bredefeldt; Ingrid Thulin
- Cinematography: Jörgen Persson
- Edited by: Wic Kjellin
- Music by: Bengt Ernryd
- Production company: Sandrews
- Distributed by: Sandrews
- Release date: 23 February 1974
- Running time: 142 minutes
- Country: Sweden
- Language: Swedish

A Handful of Love (Swedish: En handfull kärlek) is a 1974 Swedish period drama film directed by Vilgot Sjöman. It was entered into the 24th Berlin International Film Festival. At the 10th Guldbagge Awards the film won the awards for Best Film and Best Director.

== Cast ==
- Anita Ekström as Hjördis
- Gösta Bredefeldt as Daniel Severin Larsson
- Ingrid Thulin as Inez Crona
- Ernst-Hugo Järegård as Claes Crona
- Sif Ruud as Thekla Renholm
- Per Myrberg as Sebastian Renholm
- Eva-Britt Strandberg as Therese
- Frej Lindqvist as Fritz Fredrik Crona
- Anders Oscarsson as Henning Christian Crona
- Gunnar Ossiander as Grandfather Crona
- Chris Wahlström as Magdalena
- Bibi Skoglund as Adele
- Claire Wikholm as Zaida
- Ernst Günther as Finland
- Harald Hamrell as Linus
