= Paul Merzbach =

Austrian screenwriter and film director (1888–1943)

- Born: 27 November 1888; Vienna, Austro-Hungarian Empire
- Died: September 1943 (aged 54); London, United Kingdom
- Occupations: Film director Screenwriter; Film editor
- Years active: 1921 - 1942

Paul Merzbach (27 November 1888 – September 1943) was an Austrian screenwriter and film director. Merzbach worked in the Austrian and Germany film industries during the early stages of his career. He worked initially on scripts, but in 1924 he directed his first film. During the late 1920s, Merzbach worked in Sweden before returning to Germany.

Following the Nazi rise to power in 1933, Merzbach went into exile in Britain. He worked in the British film industry for the remainder of his career. His final contribution was the screenplay for Hatter's Castle (1942), directed by Lance Comfort.

== Selected filmography ==
=== Director ===
- The Hobgoblin (1924)
- Old Mamsell's Secret (1925)
- The Bank Crash of Unter den Linden (1926)
- For Her Sake (1930)
- Dante's Mysteries (1931)
- The False Millionaire (1931)
- Mother-in-Law's Coming (1932)
- Love at Second Sight (1934)
- Invitation to the Waltz (1935)
- A Star Fell from Heaven (1936)

=== Screenwriter ===
- The House in Dragon Street (1921)
- The Golden Plague (1921)
- Lola Montez, the King's Dancer (1922)
- The Lady and Her Hairdresser (1922)
- The Great Unknown (1924)
- Letters Which Never Reached Him (1925)
- A Sister of Six (1926)
- Only a Dancing Girl (1926)
- Sealed Lips (1927)
- Parisiennes (1928)
- Sin (1928)
- The Triumph of the Heart (1929)
- Say It with Music (1929)
- Father and Son (1930)
- The False Millionaire (1931)
- The Secret of Johann Orth (1932)
- Temptation (1934)
- Mimi (1935)
- Hail and Farewell (1936)
- It Happened to One Man (1940)
- Hatter's Castle (1942)

== Bibliography ==
- Bergfelder, Tim & Cargnelli, Christian. Destination London: German-speaking emigrés and British cinema, 1925-1950. Berghahn Books, 2008.
- Brinson, Charmian, Dove, Richard & Taylor, Jennifer. Immortal Austria?: Austrians in Exile in Britain. Rodopi, 2007.
