= Håkan Westergren =

Swedish actor (1899–1981)

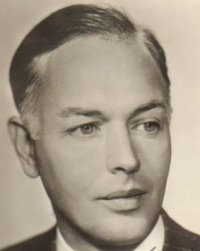
- Westergren in 1942
- Born: Håkan Karl Leonard Westergren; 29 April 1899; Solna, Sweden
- Died: 15 October 1981 (aged 82); Stockholm, Sweden
- Education: Royal Dramatic Training Academy
- Occupation: Actor
- Years active: 1922–1980
- Spouse: Inga Tidblad (m. 1931–1975)
- Children: Meg Westergren; Claes-Håkan Westergren

Håkan Karl Leonard Westergren (29 April 1899 – 15 October 1981) was a Swedish actor. He was mostly known for his roles in Swedish comedy movies during the 1930s and 1940s, but was sometimes seen in more serious roles. He was married to Swedish actress Inga Tidblad; together they had daughter Meg Westergren and son Claes-Håkan Westergren, also actors.

He began his acting career in 1922 when he graduated from the Royal Dramatic Training Academy. He worked as a stage actor in Finland and Sweden. He appeared in 70 films. He died at St. Erik's Hospital on 15 October 1981 aged 82.

== Selected filmography ==
- Say It with Music (1929)
- For Her Sake (1930)
- Frida's Songs (1930)
- The Red Day (1931)
- The False Millionaire (1931)
- Colourful Pages (1931)
- Tired Theodore (1931)
- International Match (1932)
- His Life's Match (1932)
- House Slaves (1933)
- What Do Men Know? (1933)
- Swedenhielms (1935)
- He, She and the Money (1936)
- It Pays to Advertise (1936)
- Kungen kommer (1936)
- The Wedding Trip (1936)
- Unfriendly Relations (1936)
- Adventure (1936)
- Sara Learns Manners (1937)
- Dollar (1938)
- The Great Love (1938)
- Nothing But the Truth (1939)
- With Open Arms (1940)
- Her Melody (1940)
- A Crime (1940)
- One, But a Lion! (1940)
- Tonight or Never (1941)
- How to Tame a Real Man (1941)
- Mister Collins' Adventure (1943)
- His Excellency (1944)
- The Green Lift (1944)
- The Invisible Wall (1944)
- My People Are Not Yours (1944)
- Johansson and Vestman (1946)
- The Kiss on the Cruise (1950)
- Beef and the Banana (1951)
- Divorced (1951)
- Blondie, Beef and the Banana (1952)
- Getting Married (1955)
- Uncle's (1955)
- Pistol (1973)
