= Bertil Malmberg =

Swedish author, poet, and actor

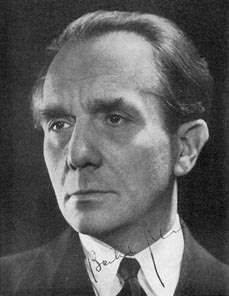
- Born: 13 August 1889
- Died: 11 February 1958 (aged 68)

Bertil Frans Harald Malmberg (13 August 1889 - 11 February 1958) was a Swedish writer, poet, and actor. He was born in Härnösand to Teodor Malmberg and Hanna Roman. Malmberg is the 1956 winner of the Dobloug Prize, a literature prize awarded for Swedish and Norwegian fiction.

He has published five books of poetry and has translated a volume of Schiller. From 1917 to 1928, he lived in Germany. In 1936, he published one of the first accounts in Swedish of a concentration camp.

He died in Stockholm.

== Works ==
- 1908 - Bränder
- 1916 - Atlantis
- 1923 - Orfika
- 1924 - Ake and His World
- 1927 - Slöjan
- 1929 - Vinden
- 1932 - Illusionernas värld
- 1936 - Tyska intryck
- 1937 - Värderingar
- 1942 - Excellensen, dt.: Die Exzellenz
- 1947 - Under månens fallande båge
- 1948 - Men bortom marterpålarna
- 1949 - Utan resolution
- 1949 - Staden i regnet
- 1950 - Med cyklopöga
- 1951 - Idealet och livet
- 1956 - Förklädda memoarer

Cultural offices
Preceded by Gustaf Hellström	Swedish Academy, Seat No.18; 1953-1958	Succeeded by Gunnar Ekelöf
