= List of Swedish films of the 1910s =

This is a list of the earliest films produced in Sweden in the 1910s.

Swedish title	English title	Director	Cast	Genre	Notes
1912
Ett hemligt giftermål	A Ruined Life	Victor Sjöström	Hilda Borgström, John Ekman	Drama	Sjöström's debut
Trädgårdsmästaren	The Gardener	Victor Sjöström	Victor Sjöström, Gosta Ekman	Drama	
1913
Äktenskapsbyrån	Marriage Bureau	Victor Sjöström	Helfrid Lambert	Drama	
Ingeborg Holm		Victor Sjöström	Hilda Borgström	Drama	
Lady Marions sommarflirt	Lady Marion's Summer Flirtation	Victor Sjöström	Hilda Borgström	Drama	
Löjen och tårar	Laughter and Tears	Victor Sjöström	Victor Lundberg, Mia Hagman	Drama	
Den moderna suffragetten	The Modern Suffragettes	Mauritz Stiller	Lili Ziedner, Stina Berg	Drama	
1914
Gatans barn	Children of the Streets	Victor Sjöström	Lili Bech	Drama	
Hjärtan som mötas	Hearts That Meet	Victor Sjöström	Greta Almroth, John Ekman	Romance	
Högfjällets dotter	Daughter of the Peaks	Victor Sjöström	Greta Almroth	Drama	
1915
I prövningens stund	In the Hour of Trial	Victor Sjöström	Kotti Chave, Richard Lund	Drama	
Judaspengar	The Price of Betrayal	Victor Sjöström	Gabriel Alw, Stina Berg	Drama	
Sonad skuld	Guilt Redeemed	Victor Sjöström	Lili Bech	Drama	
1916
Dödskyssen	Kiss of Death	Victor Sjöström	Victor Sjöström		
Skepp som mötas	The Ships That Meet	Victor Sjöström	Lili Bech	Drama	
Therèse		Victor Sjöström	Lili Bech	Drama	
Vingarne	The Wings	Mauritz Stiller	Egil Eide, Lars Hanson	Drama	
1917
Tösen från Stormyrtorpet	The Girl from the Marsh Croft	Victor Sjöström	Greta Almroth	Drama	
Terje Vigen	A Man There Was	Victor Sjöström	Victor Sjöström	Drama	
1918
Berg-Ejvind och hans hustru	The Outlaw and His Wife	Victor Sjöström	Victor Sjöström, Edith Erastoff	Drama, history	
Thomas Graals bästa barn	Thomas Graal's Best Child	Mauritz Stiller	Victor Sjöström, Karin Molander	Drama	
1919
Hans nåds testamente	His Lordship's Last Will	Victor Sjöström	Karl Mantzius	Drama	
Herr Arnes pengar	Sir Arne's Treasure	Mauritz Stiller	Richard Lund, Mary Johnson	Drama, history	
Ingmarssönerna	The Sons of Ingmar	Victor Sjöström			
