= Oscar Byström =

Oscar Byström may refer to:

- Oscar Byström (composer) (1821–1909), 19th-century Swedish composer
- Oscar Byström (actor) (1857–1938), Swedish actor
