= Byström =

Byström is a Swedish surname. Notable people with the surname include:

- Johan Niclas Byström (1783–1848), Swedish sculptor
- Malin Byström (born 1973), Swedish operatic soprano
- Margaretha Byström (born 1937), Swedish actress, writer and director
- Oscar Byström (composer) (1821–1909), Swedish composer and scholar
- Oscar Byström (actor) (1857–1938), Swedish actor
- Thomas Byström (1893–1979), Swedish equestrian

== See also ==
- Bystrom, California, a census-designated place in Stanislaus County, California
