= Almroth =

Almroth is a given name and surname. Notable people with the name include:

- Almroth Wright (1861–1947), British microbiologist and immunologist
- Greta Almroth (1888–1981), Swedish actress
