= Her Little Majesty =

Her Little Majesty may refer to:

- Her Little Majesty (1925 film), a Swedish silent comedy drama film
- Her Little Majesty (1939 film), a Swedish comedy drama film
