= Carlo Wieth =

Danish actor (1885–1943)

- Born: Carl Andersen; 11 December 1885; Copenhagen, Denmark
- Died: 30 June 1943 (aged 57); Hovedstaden, Denmark
- Education: Royal Danish Theatre
- Occupation: Actor
- Years active: 1905–1943
- Spouse(s): Clara Pontoppidan (1906–1917); Agnes Thorberg Wieth (1917–1943, his death)
- Children: Mogens Wieth

Carlo Rossini Wieth (born Carl Andersen; 11 December 1885 – 30 June 1943) was a Danish stage and film actor whose career began at the turn of the 20th century and lasted until his death in 1943.

== Early life and stage career ==
Wieth was born as Carl Andersen in Copenhagen to Marius Hans Lindegaard Andersen, who was a judge, and his wife Jacobine Kirstine Wieth Andersen. He would begin his acting career after adding an "o" to his given name of Carl and taking his mother's maiden name. He was educated at the Royal Danish Theatre from 1903 to 1905 and made his stage debut in 1905. He was an actor at the Danish Royal Theatre from 1905 to 1907, 1908 to 1909 and again from 1923 to 1943.

From 1907 to 1908 and 1909 to 1910, he was engaged as an actor at the Dagmar Theatre, from 1911 to 1922 at the Folketeatret, and spent a year at the Betty Nansen Teatret beginning in 1922 before traveling abroad.

== Film career ==
Wieth made his film debut in 1910 for Kinografen before spending nearly the entirety of his film career at Nordisk Film. In 1911, he appeared in the controversial August Blom-directed Mormonens offer (A Victim of the Mormons). The film was controversial for demonizing the Mormon religion, and its box-office success is cited for initiating a decade of anti-Mormon propaganda films in America. The film tells the story of an attractive young woman who is seduced and kidnapped by a Mormon missionary, then forced to accompany him to Utah to become one of his wives. The film became a hit, in part due to the publicity from the Church of Jesus Christ of Latter-day Saints' objections and its failed campaign to ban the film.

Between 1912 and 1914, he appeared in approximately nine Swedish silent films for such directors as John Ekman, Mauritz Stiller and Victor Sjöström before returning to Denmark and appearing in such films as Gunnar Sommerfeldt's 1918 drama En Lykkeper in 1918 and in Carl Theodor Dreyer's popular 1921 silent drama Leaves from Satan's Book, which tells the tale of Satan's banishment from heaven. Leaves Out of the Book of Satan would be Wieth's last silent film before returning to the stage. He wouldn't return to the screen until appearing in his first talkie; Pál Fejös's 1935 Det gyldne smil (The Golden Smile) opposite Bodil Ipsen. He would appear in approximately ten sound films before his death. His last film was in the 1943 romantic comedy Vi kunde ha' det saa rart, opposite Bodil Kjer.

== Personal life ==
Wieth was at various times a member of the Danish Arts Council, the International Union of Actors, and Vice President of the Danish Actors' Union.

Wieth was married twice; his first marriage was to Danish stage and screen actress Clara Pontoppidan from 1906 to 1917. The pair had appeared in several films together. Wieth and Pontoppidan divorced and produced no offspring. His second marriage was to actress Agnes Thorberg Wieth (née Sommer) in 1917. The couple had a son, actor Mogens Wieth. Carlo and Agnes would remain married until Wieth's death.

== Death ==
On 30 June 1943, Wieth was on a bicycle excursion in the Gribskov forest in the Hovedstaden region on Zealand when he collapsed from a fatal heart attack, aged 57. He was interred at the Vestre Cemetery in Copenhagen.

== Partial filmography ==
- En rekrut fra 64 (1910) - Recruit
- Ekspeditricen (1911) - Edgar, their son
- Mormonens offer (A Victim of the Mormons) (1911) - Sven Berg
- Anna fra Æbeltoft (1911) - Lt. Peter
- Historien om en moder (1912) - Son
- Kommandørens døtre (1912) - Jan Børresen, kommandørens nevø
- Vennerne fra Officersskolen (1913) - Lt. Emile
- På livets ödesvägar (1913) - Benjamin Green
- The Miracle (Swedish: Miraklet) (1913) - Armand
- The Clergyman (Swedish: Prästen) (1914) - Frans
- Hearts That Meet (Swedish: Hjärtan som mötas) (1914, Short) - Albert
- Guilt Redeemed (Swedish: Sonad skuld) (1915) - Hennis bror
- Skildpadden (1915) - John O'Brien
- Dr. X (1915) - Dr. Felix
- Den hvide djævel (1916) - C. Herveau - Barrister
- Det unge Blod (1916) - Count Preben
- I livets brænding (1916) - Ernst
- Truet lykke (1916) - Robert Malcolm
- Guldets gift (1916) - Karl Breide
- Danserindens hævn (1916) - Edvin Sparre
- Maharadjahens yndlingshustru I (1917) - Lt. Kuno von Falkenberg
- Pax aeterna (Eternal Peace) (1917) - Crown Prince Alexis
- Handelen med Menneskeliv (1917) - Emile Bernhard
- Studenterkammeraterne (1917) - Kai Frank
- En Lykkeper (1918) - Peter Lykke
- Hans Kæreste (1918) - Count Paul
- Kærlighedens almagt (1919) - Dr. Victor
- Lykkens blændværk (1919) - Poul Bang
- Den flyvende Hollænder I-IV (1920) - Filip Vanderdecken
- Blade af Satans bog (Leaves from Satan's Book) (1920) - Paavo (fourth sequence)
- Jafet, der søger sig en Fader I-IV (1922) - Jafet Newland
- Den sidste af slægten (1922) - Niels
- Det gyldne smil (The Golden Smile) (1935) - Peter Clark
- Kongen bød (1938) - Christian Ditlev Reventlow
- Livet paa Hegnsgaard (Life on the Hegn Farm) (1938) - Proprietær Nørholm
- Skilsmissens børn (Children of Divorce) (1939) - Mr. Lang
- Nordhavets mænd (1939) - Kaptajn Ek
- Elverhøj (1939) - Erik Walkendorff
- Natekspressen P903 (1942) - Politimester Aagesen
- Tyrannens fald (1942) - Skovrider Axel Høegh
- Vi kunde ha' det saa rart (1942) - Dr.med. Poul Ryding (final film role)
