= Pax aeterna =

- Directed by: Holger-Madsen
- Written by: Otto Rung; Ole Olsen
- Produced by: Nordisk Film
- Starring: Carlo Wieth; Zanny Petersen; Frederik Jacobsen
- Cinematography: Marius Clausen
- Music by: Franz Eber
- Release date: 1917
- Running time: 99 minutes
- Country: Denmark
- Language: Danish

Pax aeterna is a 1917 Danish silent drama film directed by Holger-Madsen.

== Main cast ==
- Frederik Jacobsen - King Elin XII
- Carlo Wieth - Crown Prince Alexis
- Zanny Petersen - Bianca
- Philip Bech - Professor Baron Claudius
- Carl Lauritzen Wilmer - War Minister
- Marius Egeskov - Gregor
- Anton de Verdier - Malcus
