= The People of Simlang Valley =

The People of Simlang Valley (Swedish: Folket i Simlångsdalen) may refer to:

- The People of Simlang Valley, a 1903 novel by Fredrik Ström
- The People of Simlang Valley (1924 film), a Swedish silent film directed by Theodor Berthels
- The People of Simlang Valley (1947 film), a Swedish film directed by Åke Ohberg
