= Flickan från Paradiset =

1924 film by Theodor Berthels

- Directed by: Theodor Berthels
- Screenplay by: Henning Ohlson
- Produced by: Lars Björck
- Starring: Mathias Taube; Hilda Borgström; Jessie Wessel; Gösta Nohre
- Release date: 1924
- Running time: 86 minutes
- Country: Sweden
- Language: Swedish

Flickan från Paradiset ("The girl from paradise") is a 1924 Swedish drama film directed by Theodor Berthels.

== Synopsis ==
Torkel Gudmundson is the proud owner of a beautiful farm, called Paradise. His wife Hilda, however, longs to move back to the city, and Ruterberg, an engineer, wants to buy the farm from him because he believes there to be iron ore in the ground (which fact he keeps from Torkel).

Eventually, after Börje, Torkel's younger son, is saved from drowning in the river by Ruterberg, Torkel sells the farm. The family moves to the city, and there it runs into many hardships.

== Cast ==
- Mathias Taube – Torkel Gudmundson
- Hilda Borgström – Märta, his wife
- Jessie Wessel – Hildur, their daughter
- Gösta Nohre – Ragnar, the elder son
- Åke West – Börje, the younger son
- Fridolf Rhudin – Måns Persson
- Carl Ström - the engineer Ruterberg
- Uno Henning - John Wiksjö
- Wictor Hagman - Harry Karlsson, convict
- Ingeborg Olsen - Gudrun, Ragnar's girlfriend
- Gösta Hillberg - Detective
- Nils Andersson – Detective
- Thure Jarl – Detective
