= Clara Pontoppidan =

Danish actress (1883–1975)

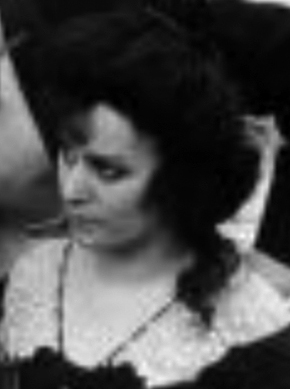
- Clara Pontoppidan in In the Hands of Impostors (1911)
- Born: 23 April 1883; Copenhagen, Denmark
- Died: 22 January 1975 (aged 91); Copenhagen, Denmark
- Resting place: Ordrup Cemetery, Ordrup
- Occupation: Actress
- Years active: 1902–1972
- Spouse: Carlo Wieth (m. 1906, div. 1917)

Clara Pontoppidan (23 April 1883 – 22 January 1975), also known as Clara Wieth, was a Danish actress. She worked mainly in Swedish and Danish silent films, including A Victim of the Mormons (Denmark, 1911).

== Personal life ==
Clara Pontoppidan was married to actor Carlo Wieth from 20 October 1906 until their divorce in 1917. She died in 1975, aged 91, in Copenhagen and is buried in Ordrup Cemetery.

== Selected filmography ==
- Dorian Grays Portræt (1910)
- A Victim of the Mormons (1911)
- The Miracle (1913)
- The Clergyman (1914)
- Bra flicka reder sig själv (1914)
- Häxan (1922)
- En kvinde er overflødig (1957)

== Awards ==
- 1931 Ingenio et Arti gold medal
- 1937 Tagea Brandt Rejselegat
- 1958 Bodil Award for Best Actress in a Leading Role
