= Yngve Nordwall =

Swedish actor

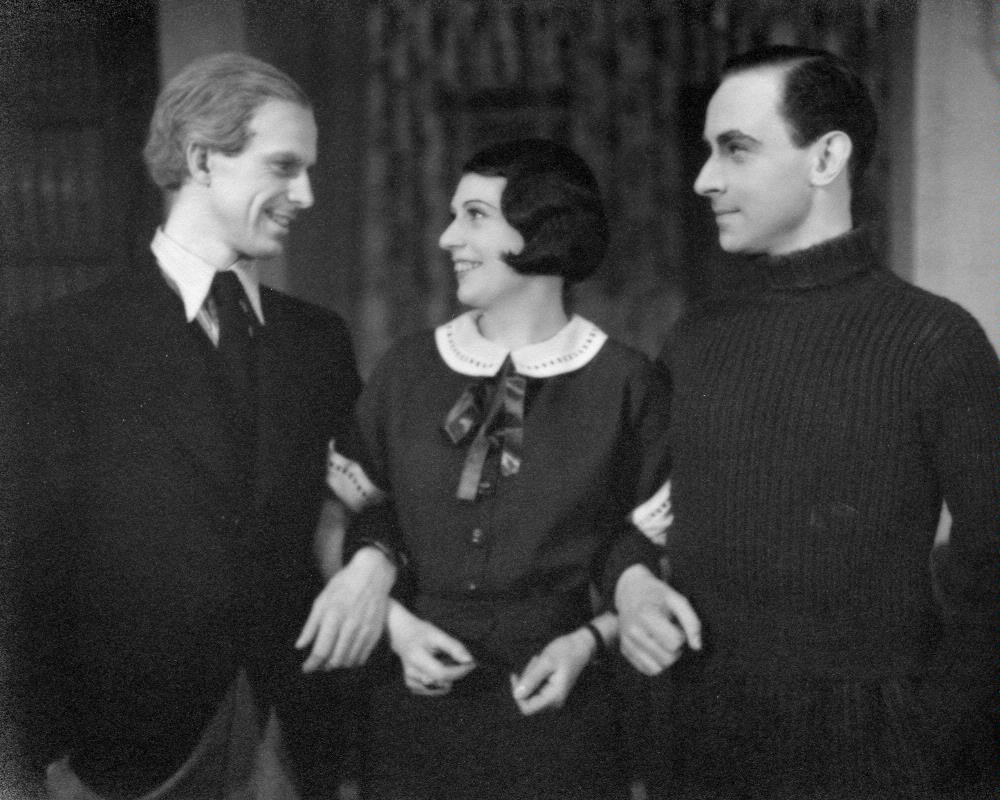
- Yngve Nordwall, Nina Scenna and Ivar Wahlgren in Hypocrite at Helsingborg's city theater.
- Born: 13 April 1908; Uppsala, Sweden
- Died: 23 January 1994 (aged 85); Gothenburg, Sweden
- Years active: 1940–1986

Yngve Nordwall (13 April 1908 – 23 January 1994) was a Swedish film actor and director.

== Filmography ==
Year	Title	Role	Notes
1940	Västkustens hjältar	Erik Gunnarsson	Uncredited
1941	Scanian Guerilla	Sören	
1944	Count Only the Happy Moments	Ragnar Normark	
1947	Crime in the Sun	Doktor Bergquist	
1948	Loffe the Tramp	Heiman	
1948	Port of Call	The Supervisor	
1950	This Can't Happen Here	Lindell	
1953	Bread of Love	Vicar	
1955	Smiles of a Summer Night	Ferdinand	Uncredited
1956	A Little Nest	Man in auto repair shop	
1956	Sista natten	Svensson	
1957	Mr. Sleeman Is Coming	Teacher	
1957	The Minister of Uddarbo	Teacher	
1957	Wild Strawberries	Uncle Aron	
1960	On a Bench in a Park	Senior Lecturer	
