= Harry Landis =

British actor and director (1926–2022)

- Harry Landis in Dunkirk 1958
- Born: Hyman Jacob Londinsky; 25 November 1926; Stepney, London, England
- Died: 11 September 2022 (aged 95)
- Occupation: Actor
- Years active: 1954–2022

Harry Landis (born Hyman Jacob Londinsky; 25 November 1926 – 11 September 2022) was a British actor and theatre director. He had a long career in theatre, film and television, spanning over 60 years. Landis was best known for playing barber Felix Kawalski in EastEnders from 1995 to 1997, and Mr. Morris in the Channel 4 sitcom Friday Night Dinner from 2012 to 2014.

== Early life and education ==
Harry Landinski, known as Harry Landis, was born Hyman Jacob Londinsky in Stepney in the East End of London on 25 November 1926. He came from a poor background as the only child of, Sarah (née Sadie Chibulam), and a father, Morris Londinsky, a taxi driver, who left when Harry was a baby. Landis was educated at Stepney Jewish School until he was 14, when he left to become a chef in a kitchen. However, he found out that apprenticeships were only available to those aged over 16. Landis got a job in a café, before working as a window cleaner and milkman.

While working in a factory, he would perform the show he had seen at the Hackney Empire the previous night, and the shop steward encouraged him to go to the Unity Theatre, which was linked to the trade union and labour movement. After an audition, Landis began working with them. After doing his military service with the British Army during World War II, he returned to the Unity Theatre, and, by then aged 20, he was awarded a grant by the London County Council so he could study at drama school. Landis spent three years at the Central School of Speech and Drama.

== Career ==
Landis started acting aged 15. His first job after graduating from drama school was touring in Shakespeare with the Elizabethan Theatre Company. After a spell in repertory theatre, he got a leading role in A Hill in Korea as a cockney conscript. Other films followed, including Bitter Victory, Edge of Sanity, Ransom, The Informers, Private Potter, Dunkirk and Operation Bullshine. In 2014, he was in the Hollywood blockbuster Edge of Tomorrow.

His first television appearance was in 1955, in the pilot episode of Dixon of Dock Green. Landis appeared in several subsequent episodes, as well as the final episode over 25 years later. He appeared in over 200 TV shows before deciding to return to theatre.

This career move coincided with the 1956 change in British theatre led by the Royal Court Theatre, and his background at the Unity Theatre made him suitable for many subsequent roles. These included Arnold Wesker's The Kitchen, followed by Frank Norman's Insideout. They were followed by John Osborne's Time Present at the Duke of York Theatre, Journey's End at the Cambridge Theatre, and A Winter Tale, Ring Around the Moon and The Government Inspector, all at The Royal Exchange in Manchester. He also appeared in The Ticket-of-Leave Man at the National Theatre.

Landis then turned to directing, and after directing a few productions at the Unity Theatre, including a well-received production of Death of A Salesman, he became the artistic director of the Marlowe Theatre in Canterbury, where he directed some 40 plays and two pantomimes. He went on to direct national tours of The Long and The Short and the Tall and The Return of Sherlock Holmes.

In between directing, Landis appeared in many TV shows, such as Minder, and later continued to do so with series including EastEnders, Goodnight Sweetheart, Casualty and Friday Night Dinner. His last role was in Casualty, in 2018.

Landis was president of Equity for six years, from 2002 to 2008, and was a board member of the Equity Charitable Trust, from 1994 to 2001, as well as previously being Chairman of the Unity Theatre Trust.

== Personal life and death ==
Landis married actress Hilary Crane (née Strelitz) in 1965; however, the marriage ended in divorce seven years later. The marriage produced a daughter, Katy, and a stepson, Simon, from his wife's previous marriage.

Landis lived in Hammersmith, West London, for over 40 years. Landis returned to live in the East End in the 2010s, with his partner of more than 30 years, Ingrid Curry, buying a flat in Spitalfields.

Landis died from cancer on 11 September 2022, at the age of 95.

== Selected filmography ==
- Dixon of Dock Green (1955, 1963, 1966, 1971, 1972, 1975, 1976) – Finch / Bill Andrews / Jenkins / Lodger / Painter / Banjo Hamilton / Keeley
- A Hill in Korea (1956) – Pvt. Rabin
- Bitter Victory (1957) – Private Browning
- Dunkirk (1958) – Dr. Levy
- Further Up the Creek (1958) – Webster
- Operation Bullshine (1959) – Gunner Wilkinson
- Desert Mice (1959) – German Soldier (uncredited)
- The Square Ring (1959)
- The Longest Day (1962) – British Soldier (uncredited)
- Private Potter (1962) – LCpl. Lamb
- The Small World of Sammy Lee (1963) – Lucky Dave's Clumsy Barman (uncredited)
- Billy Liar (1963) – Man on Train (uncredited)
- Doctor in Distress (1963) – Man in Cafe (uncredited)
- The Informers (1963) – Hicks (uncredited)
- Calculated Risk (1963) – Charlie
- Sergeant Cork (1966) – Richard Hewatt (episode "The Case of William Huckerby, Platelayer")
- Z Cars (1968, 1971, 1974) – Billy Rees / Matic / Vernon
- Go for a Take (1972) – Maurice
- The Fenn Street Gang (1972) – Doorman
- Play for Today (1972, 1976, 1977, 1977) – Inspector Fazil / Solly / Lionel / Jourdemayne Griffiths
- Crown Court (1973, 1975–1976) – Arnold Curl / Victor Garniss
- Ransom (1974) – Lookout Pilot – George Rawlings
- Whodunnit? (1976) – Chuck James (episode Dead Grass)
- Minder (1982, 1991) – Lenny Bowman / Monty
- Howards' Way (1985) – Bernie Rosen
- Casualty (1986, 2004, 2018) – Dimitri / Gordon Dodds / Joseph Rogerson
- Bergerac (1987) – Toby Newsom
- Edge of Sanity (1989) – Coroner
- You Rang, M'Lord? (1990) – Sea Captain
- The Bill (1990, 2003, 2007) – Mr Glickstein / Harry Davies / Henryk Mitzibrowski
- Jeeves and Wooster (1991) – Proprietor
- Goodnight Sweetheart (1993) – Manny
- Lovejoy (1993) – Leo
- EastEnders (1995–1997) – Felix Kawalski
- The Discovery of Heaven (2001) – Ibrahim
- My Family (2004) – Gino
- Holby City (2006, 2009) – Ronnie Shussett / David Mannstein
- Doctors (2009, 2017) – Ralph Freedman / Theo Parry
- M.I.High (2011) – Harry Fulson
- Friday Night Dinner (2012, 2014) – Lou Anthony Morris, "Mr Morris"
- Way to Go (2013) – Mr Rothstein
- Edge of Tomorrow (2014) – Old Man 3
