= Jessie Wessel =

Swedish actress

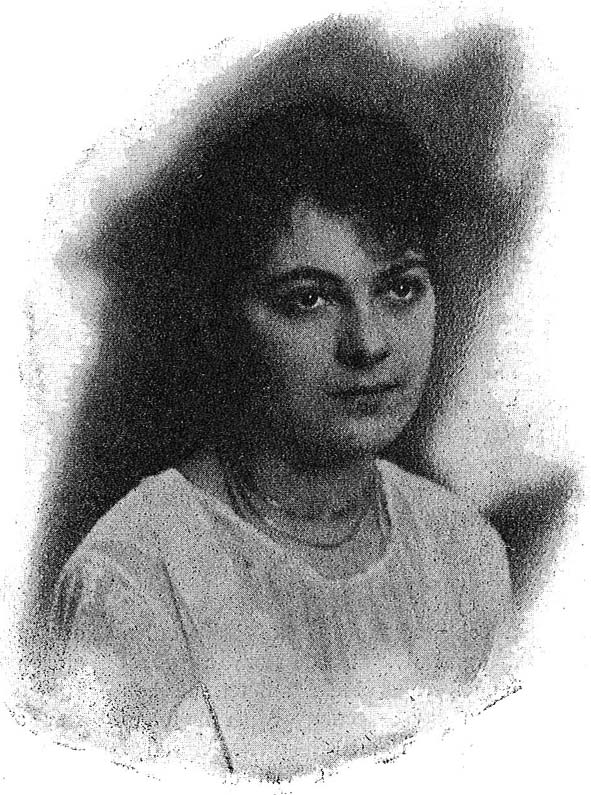
- Jessie Wessel in 1918
- Born: Jessie Nilsina Wessel; 13 April 1894; Linköping, Sweden
- Died: 23 August 1948 (aged 54); Stockholm, Sweden
- Occupation: Actress

Jessie Nilsina Wessel (13 April 1894 – 23 August 1948) was a Swedish actress.

== Biography ==
Wessel studied at the Dramaten's school from 1914 to 1916, and made her debut during this period as Bertha in The Father.

In 1928, she married the director and art collector Fritz H. Eriksson. She is buried in the Bromma cemetery in Stockholm County.

== Filmography ==
- 1920: Gyurkovicsarna
- 1920: Thora van Deken
- 1921: Högre ändamål
- 1921: Vallfarten till Kevlaar
- 1923: Hälsingar
- 1924: Flickan från Paradiset
- 1925: Två konungar
- 1928: Stormens barn
- 1928: The Poetry of Ådalen
- 1930: Hjärtats röst
