= The Poetry of Ådalen (1928 film) =

1928 film

- Directed by: Theodor Berthels
- Written by: Henning Ohlson
- Based on: Novel by Pelle Molin
- Produced by: Maja Engelbrektson
- Starring: Mathias Taube; Hilda Borgström; Jessie Wessel
- Cinematography: Carl Halling
- Production company: AB Irefilm
- Distributed by: Biörnstads Filmkompani
- Release date: 27 October 1928
- Running time: 66 minutes
- Country: Sweden
- Languages: Silent; Swedish intertitles

The Poetry of Ådalen (Swedish: Ådalens poesi) is a 1928 Swedish silent drama film directed by Theodor Berthels and starring Mathias Taube, Hilda Borgström and Jessie Wessel. It was later remade into a 1947 film of the same title.

== Cast ==
- Mathias Taube as Ortorpsfar
- Hilda Borgström as Markus hustru
- Jessie Wessel as Sago-Gunnel
- Einar Axelsson as Greger Anner
- Eric Laurent as Ingvar
- Alf Sjöberg as Gunvard
- Solveig Hedengran as Ingjerd, Ingvars dotter som vuxen
- Allan Egnell as Sigge Alm, skald
- Joel Jansson as Dräng på Ortorpsgården
- Theodor Berthels as Präst
- Mats Sjödin as Ingjerd som treåring

== Bibliography ==
- Gustafsson, Tommy . Masculinity in the Golden Age of Swedish Cinema: A Cultural Analysis of 1920s Films. McFarland, 2014.
