= Theodor Berthels =

Swedish actor, screenwriter, director

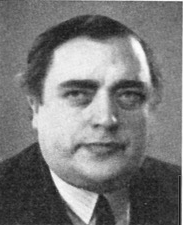
- Born: Bertil Teodor Jonsson; 16 June 1892; Norrköping, Sweden-Norway
- Died: 21 October 1951 (aged 59); Sweden
- Occupations: Actor, writer, director
- Years active: 1911–1950
- Spouse(s): Greta Andersson (m. 1917–1951; his death)

Theodor Berthels (born Bertil Teodor Jonsson; 16 June 1892 – 21 October 1951) was a Swedish actor, screenwriter and film director.

== Selected filmography ==
- The Secret of the Duchess (1923)
- Flickan från Paradiset (1924)
- The People of Simlang Valley (1924)
- The Poetry of Ådalen (1928)
- The People of Norrland (1930)
- A Night of Love by the Öresund (1931)
- Jolly Musicians (1932)
- Kanske en gentleman (1935)
- Kungen kommer (1936)
- Adolf Strongarm (1937)
- Sun Over Sweden (1938)
- Kalle's Inn (1939)
- A Sailor on Horseback (1940)
- Bashful Anton (1940)
- Blossom Time (1940)
- Fransson the Terrible (1941)
- Livet måste levas (1943)
- In Darkest Smaland (1943)
- Blizzard (1944)
- Kristin Commands (1946)
- Loffe the Tramp (1948)
- Son of the Sea (1949)
- Åsa-Nisse (1949)
- Åsa-Nisse Goes Hunting (1950)
- Perhaps a Gentleman (1950)

== Bibliography ==
- Qvist, Per Olov & von Bagh, Peter. Guide to the Cinema of Sweden and Finland. Greenwood Publishing Group, 2000.
