= The Maharaja's Favourite Wife =

1917 film directed by Max Mack

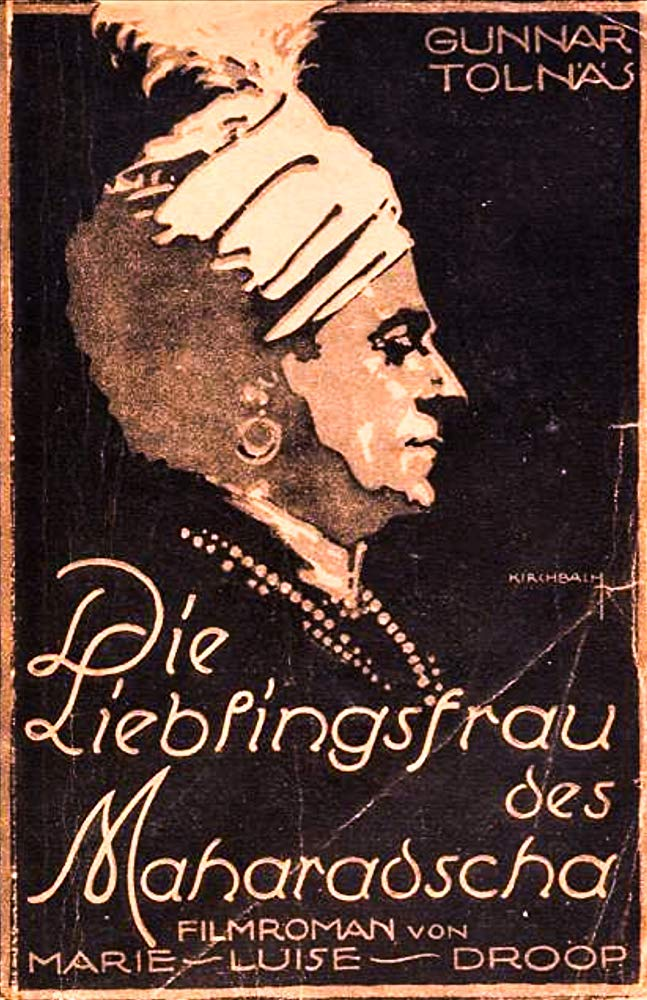
- Theatrical film poster
- German: Tausend für eine Nacht
- Directed by: Robert Dinesen (Part I); August Blom (Part II); Max Mack (Part III)
- Written by: Adolf Droop; Marie Luise Droop; Svend Gade
- Produced by: Paul Davidson; August Blom
- Starring: Gunnar Tolnæs; Fritz Kortner; Erna Morena
- Cinematography: Sophus Wangøe (Part I and II); Günther Krampf (Part III)
- Music by: Alexander Schirmann
- Production companies: Nordisk Film; PAGU
- Distributed by: UFA
- Release dates: 31 January 1917 (Part I); January 1917 (Part II); 20 January 1921 (Part III)
- Running time: 72 minutes (Part III)
- Countries: Denmark (Part I & II); Germany (Part III)
- Languages: Silent; German intertitles

The Maharaja's Favourite Wife (German: Die Lieblingsfrau des Maharadscha) is a silent adventure film directed by Max Mack and starring Gunnar Tolnæs, Fritz Kortner, and Erna Morena. Originally produced in Denmark by Nordisk Film, whose German branch was taken over during the First World War, it was released in three parts, the first two in 1917 and the third in 1921. The third part was shot at the Tempelhof Studios in Berlin, and released by the leading German company UFA. Its sets were designed by the Hungarian art director István Szirontai Lhotka.

== Cast (Part III) ==
- Gunnar Tolnæs as Maharadschah Narada
- Erna Morena as Dienerin von Maharadscha Sangia
- Aud Egede-Nissen as Tänzerin Ellen
- Fritz Kortner as Bruder von Maharadscha Bhima
- Albert Paulig as Hotelportier
- Adolf Klein as Ein Maharadscha
- Emil Rameau as Vater des Maharadscha
- Eduard Rothauser as Theater agent Martini
- Leopold von Ledebur as Theater agent
