= The Way Through the Night =

1929 film

- Directed by: Robert Dinesen
- Written by: Svend Gade; John Knittel (novel)
- Produced by: Maxim Galitzenstein
- Starring: Käthe von Nagy
- Cinematography: Georg Bruckbauer
- Production company: Maxim-Film
- Release date: 1929
- Country: Germany
- Languages: Silent; German intertitles

The Way Through the Night (German:Der Weg durch die Nacht) is a 1929 German silent film directed by Robert Dinesen and starring Käthe von Nagy.

The film's art direction was by Leopold Blonder.

== Cast ==
In alphabetical order

- Margita Alfvén
- Friedrich Ettel
- René Navarre
- Sophie Pagay
- Imre Ráday
- Eva Schablinski
- Margarete Schön
- Franz Stein
- Käthe von Nagy

== Bibliography ==
- Bock, Hans-Michael & Bergfelder, Tim. The Concise CineGraph. Encyclopedia of German Cinema. Berghahn Books, 2009.
