= Jansson's Temptation (film) =

1928 film

- Directed by: Sigurd Wallén
- Written by: Henning Ohlson; Sigurd Wallén
- Based on: Jansson's Temptation by Sigurd Wallén
- Starring: Oscar Byström; Margita Alfvén; Edvin Adolphson
- Cinematography: Axel Lindblom
- Production company: Film AB Minerva
- Distributed by: Svensk Filmindustri
- Release date: 28 December 1928
- Running time: 104 minutes
- Country: Sweden
- Languages: Silent; Swedish intertitles

Jansson's Temptation (Swedish: Janssons frestelse) is a 1928 Swedish silent comedy film directed by Sigurd Wallén and starring Oscar Byström, Margita Alfvén and Edvin Adolphson. It was shot at the Råsunda Studios in Stockholm. The film's sets were designed by the art director Vilhelm Bryde. The film is based on a play of the same name by Wallén, which takes its title from the Swedish casserole dish Jansson's temptation.

== Cast ==
- Oscar Byström as Baron Casimir von Werne
- Margita Alfvén as Inga
- Edvin Adolphson as Gunnar Jansson
- Stina Berg as Bernhardina
- Lars Egge as Axel Hall
- Jullan Kindahl as Kerstin

== Bibliography ==
- Gustafsson, Tommy. Masculinity in the Golden Age of Swedish Cinema: A Cultural Analysis of 1920s Films. McFarland, 2014.
- Qvist, Per Olov & von Bagh, Peter. Guide to the Cinema of Sweden and Finland. Greenwood Publishing Group, 2000.
