= Gunnar Tolnæs =

Norwegian actor

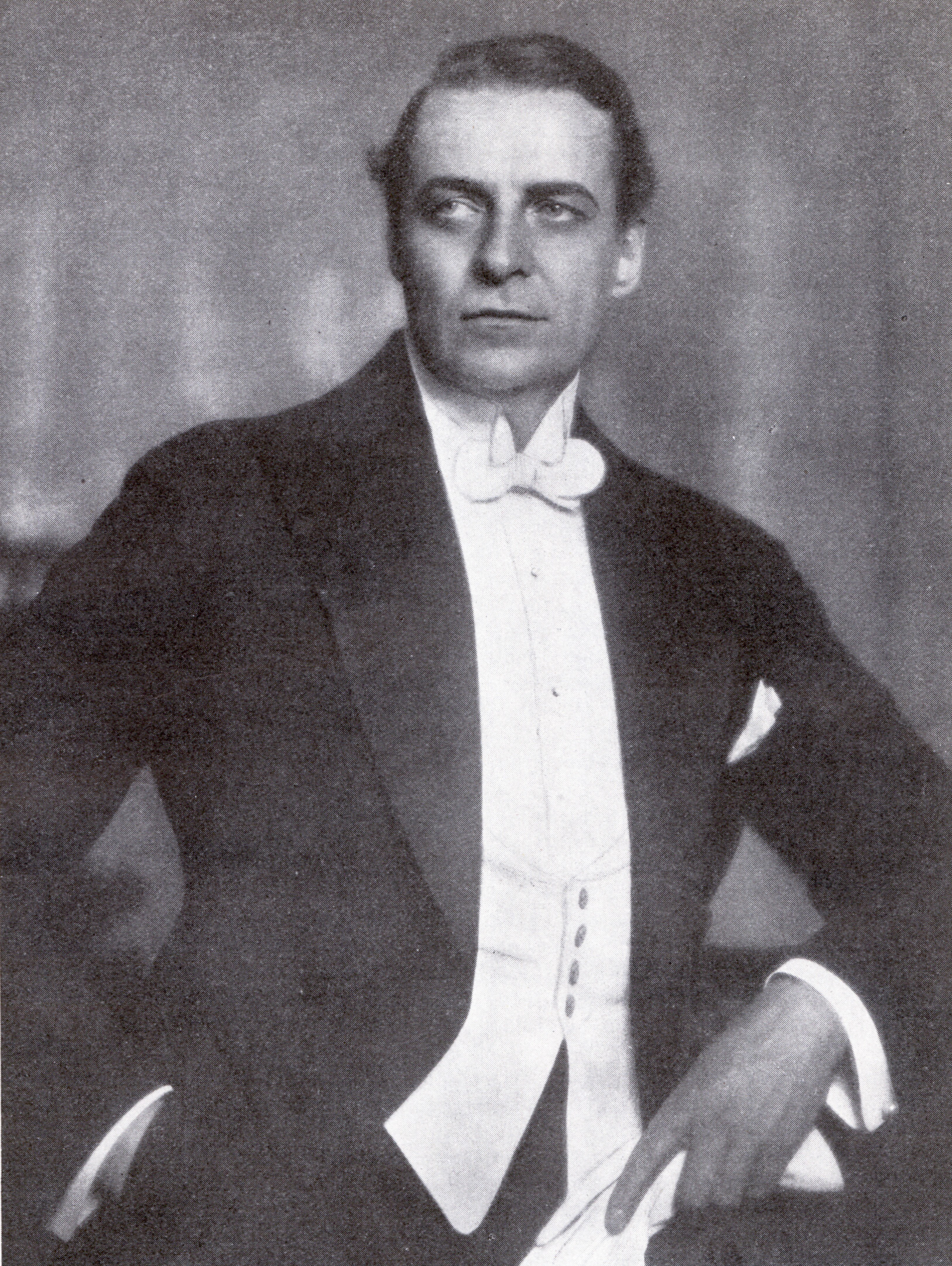
- Gunnar Tolnæs in 1927.jpg
- Born: 7 December 1879; Oslo, Norway
- Died: 9 November 1940 (aged 60); Oslo, Norway
- Occupation: Actor

Gunnar Tolnæs (1879–1940) was a Norwegian-born actor who worked for most of his career in Denmark.

== Early life ==
He was born in Oslo, Norway.

== Career ==
He started his career with the theatre in 1906, with a long theater career in various Norwegian theaters, along with guest appearances in Copenhagen.

He debuted in film in 1914 in a Swedish-made silent film. The following year he came to Nordisk Film in Denmark, replacing Valdemar Psilander as the company's main star. He had led or co-starred in a total of 27 Danish silent films.

Tolnæs's film credits, all silent films, include:

- Children of the Streets (1914)
- One of the Many (1915)
- Himmelskibet (also known as A Trip To Mars) (1918)
- The Maharaja's Favourite Wife (1921)
- The Flight into Marriage (1922)
- Her Little Majesty (1925)
- Sex in Chains (1928)

== Personal life and demise ==
He died in Oslo at age 60. He is buried with his family at Vestre gravlund.
