= Mr. Sleeman Is Coming =

1957 film

- Directed by: Ingmar Bergman
- Written by: Hjalmar Bergman
- Produced by: Henrik Dyfverman
- Starring: Bibi Andersson
- Release date: 18 April 1957
- Running time: 43 minutes
- Country: Sweden
- Language: Swedish

Mr. Sleeman Is Coming (Swedish: Herr Sleeman kommer) is a 1917 one-act play by the Swedish author Hjalmar Bergman. The main character is an orphaned young woman who is about to be married off to an unappealing but rich old man, Mr. Sleeman, at the instigation of her aunts who have taken charge of her. Bergman infuses the situation with overtones of rueful pessimism concerning life in general.

The play is one of his most successful pieces of theatre and has been staged many times in Sweden and also on Swedish television. In 1957, Ingmar Bergman directed the first TV adaptation.

== Cast ==
- Bibi Andersson as Anne-Marie
- Jullan Kindahl as Mrs. Mina
- Yngve Nordwall as Mr. Sleeman
- Max von Sydow as The hunter
- Naima Wifstrand as Mrs. Gina
