= Margita Alfvén =

Swedish actress

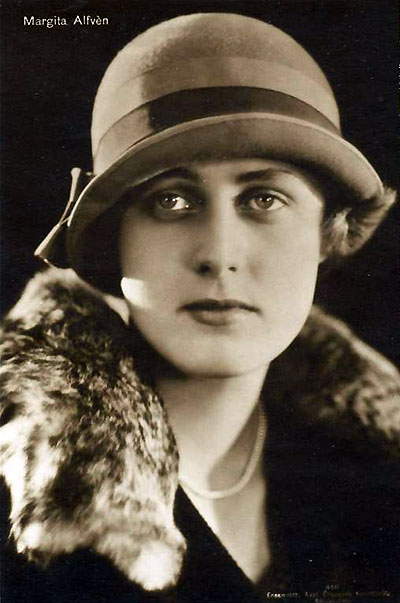
- Born: 16 November 1905; Copenhagen, Denmark
- Died: 11 March 1962 (aged 56); Stockholm, Sweden
- Occupation: Actress
- Years active: 1925-1932 (film)

Margita Alfvén (November 16, 1905 – March 11, 1962) was a Danish-born Swedish film actress of the silent and early sound era.

She was the daughter of the composer Hugo Alfvén and the artist Marie Krøyer. In 1920, at the age of 15, she became engaged to the then 30-year-old Evert Taube, but the relationship did not last long. 1924–1927 she was married to Henrik Conrad Bohlin.

== Selected filmography ==
- Her Little Majesty (1925)
- The Million Dollars (1926)
- Uncle Frans (1926)
- Jansson's Temptation (1928)
- Parisiennes (1928)
- The Way Through the Night (1929)
- Three from the Unemployment Office (1932)
- Girls to Marry (1932)

== Bibliography ==
- Tommy Gustafsson. Masculinity in the Golden Age of Swedish Cinema: A Cultural Analysis of 1920s Films. McFarland, 2014.
