= The People of Simlang Valley (1924 film) =

1924 film

- Directed by: Theodor Berthels
- Written by: Theodor Berthels; Ivar Johansson
- Based on: The People of Simlang Valley by Fredrik Ström
- Produced by: Lars Björck
- Starring: Mathias Taube; Greta Almroth; Paul Seelig
- Cinematography: Adrian Bjurman
- Edited by: Adrian Bjurman
- Production company: Filmindustri AB Triumvir
- Release date: 3 November 1924
- Running time: 81 minutes
- Country: Sweden
- Languages: Silent; Swedish intertitles

The People of Simlang Valley (Swedish: Folket i Simlångsdalen) is a 1924 Swedish silent drama film directed by Theodor Berthels and starring Mathias Taube, Greta Almroth and Paul Seelig. After this film, Almroth took an extended break from acting, returning a decade later with the 1934 Melody of the Sea. The film's sets were designed by the art director Bertil Duroj.

== Cast ==
- Mathias Taube as Sig Folkeson
- Greta Almroth as Ingrid
- Elly Holmberg as Marit
- Ida Schylander as Skog-Börta
- Theodor Berthels as Lars Brand
- Paul Seelig as Sven Brand
- Semmy Friedmann as Tattar-Jan
- Georg Blomstedt as Policeman
- Fridolf Rhudin as Alarik
- Gösta Gustafson as Wallenbeck
- Carl Wallin as Sibelius

== Bibliography ==
- Wallengren, Ann-Kristin. Welcome Home Mr Swanson: Swedish Emigrants and Swedishness on Film. Nordic Academic Press, 2014.
