= Jullan Kindahl =

Swedish actress (1885–1979)

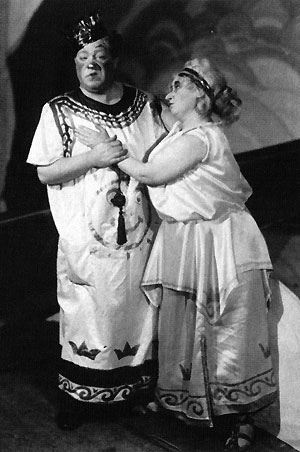
- Jullan Kindahl and Edvard Persson in Orfeus (1926)
- Born: 12 April 1885; Stockholm, Sweden
- Died: 18 April 1979 (aged 94); Malmö, Sweden
- Occupation: Actress
- Years active: 1909–1970

Jullan Kindahl (12 April 1885 – 18 April 1979) was a Swedish actress. Born Julia Carolina Carlsson, she worked as an actress from 1900s until the 1960s. She appeared in Swedish theatres like the Hippodromen in Malmö, the Malmö City Theatre in Malmö and the Stora Teatern in Göteborg. Kindahl also made 33 films between 1923 and 1962. She remains perhaps best known for her domestic supporting roles in two films: as the cook Beata in Smiles of a Summer Night (1955) and as Professor Borg's housekeeper Agda in Wild Strawberries (1957), both of which were directed by Ingmar Bergman. She was married to actor Arvid Kindahl (1887–1927) from 1913 until his early death.

== Partial filmography ==
- Janne Modig (1923) – Olivia Blåqvist
- Miljonär för en dag (1926) – Maid
- Vad kvinnan vill (1927) – Amanda
- På kryss med Blixten (1927) – Månsson
- Hattmakarens bal (1928) – Retainer
- Jansson's Temptation (1928) – Kerstin
- Inled mig i frestelse (1933) – Lundén
- Andersson's Kalle (1934) – Mrs. Lundström
- Svensson ordnar allt! (1938) – Hostess
- It Is My Music (1942) – Mrs. Johansson
- Stinsen på Lyckås (1942) – Mrs. Nilsson
- En vår i vapen (1943) – Mormor
- Elvira Madigan (1943) – Trine, Elvira's Mother
- The Sin of Anna Lans (1943) – Gossiping Lady
- Det går som en dans... (1943) – Landlady
- I dag gifter sig min man (1943) – Maria
- Gentleman with a Briefcase (1943) – Boarding house hostess (uncredited)
- Aktören (1943) – Mrs. Pettersson
- Blizzard (1944) – Maria
- The Old Clock at Ronneberga (1944) – Madame Hallström
- I Am Fire and Air (1944) – Mrs. Frida Sundelin
- Blåjackor (1945) – Miss Ripa
- The Journey Away (1945) – Nurse (uncredited)
- Den glade skräddaren (1945) – Mrs. Larsson, midwife (uncredited)
- I Love You Karlsson (1947) – Hulda
- Smiles of a Summer Night (1955) – Beata, cook
- The Light from Lund (1955) – Steen's Mother
- Last Pair Out (1956) – Alma
- Mr. Sleeman Is Coming (1957, TV Movie) – Tant Mina
- Wild Strawberries (1957) – Agda
- The Wedding Day (1960) – Asta
