= August Warberg =

Swedish actor (1842–1915)

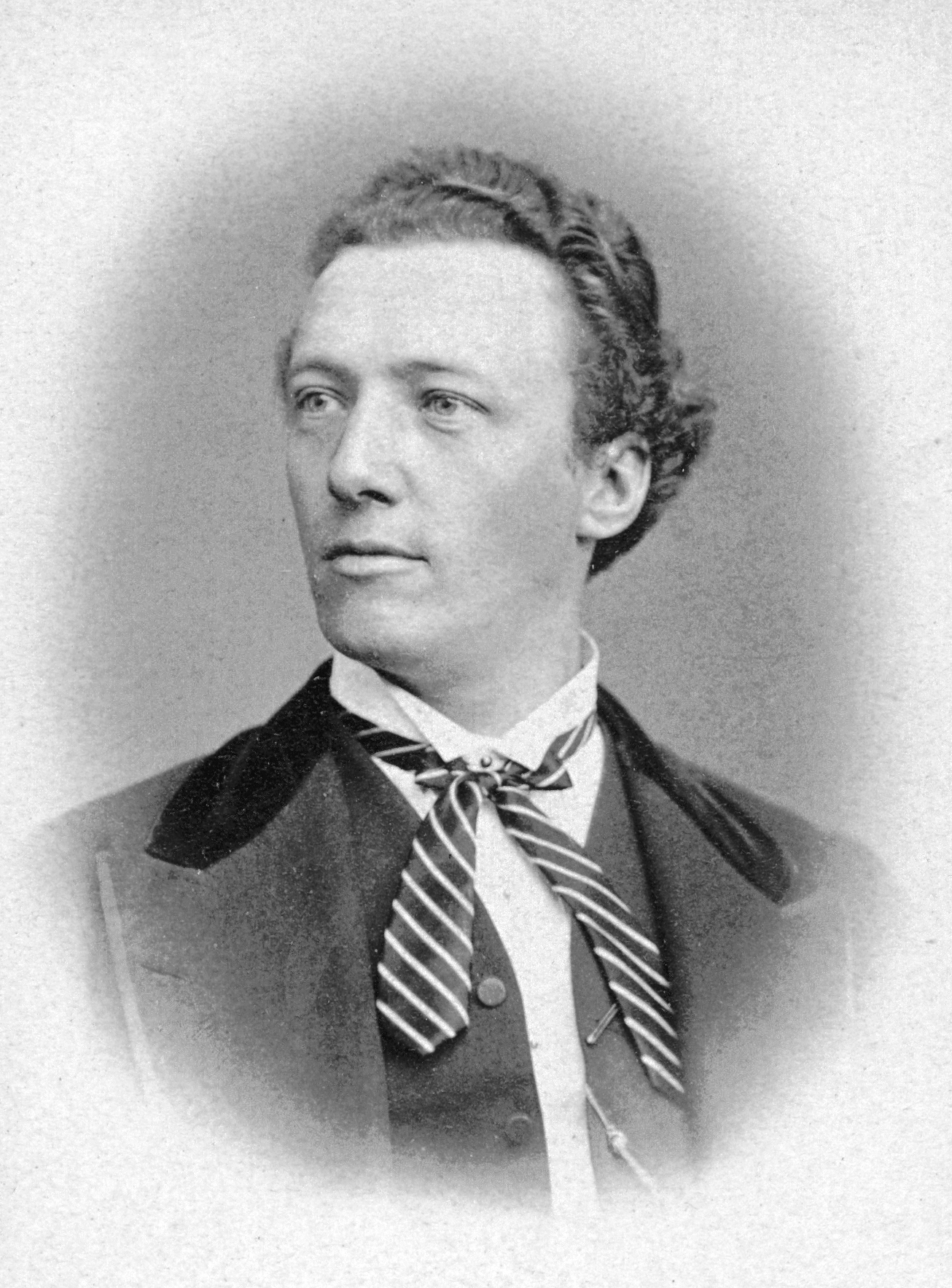
- Warberg in 1865
- Born: Johan August Warberg; 5 May 1842; Glava, Arvika Municipality, Värmland, Sweden
- Died: 16 October 1915 (aged 73); Stockholm, Sweden
- Occupations: Actor, theater director
- Years active: 1861–1915
- Spouse: Anna Sofia Charlotta Warberg (née Magnusson)

Johan August Warberg (5 May 1842 – 16 October 1915) was a Swedish stage and film actor and theater director whose career spanned over fifty years.

Warberg made his stage debut as an actor in 1861. During his long career as a stage actor and theater director, he worked the Vasateatern, Mindre teatern, Djurgårdsteatern, Södra teatern and the Svenska Teatern.

He married stage actress Anna Sofia Charlotta "Lotten" Warberg (née Magnusson) in 1865 and the couple had three children. Before his death at age 73 in 1915, he also appeared in a number of silent films. All but one, 1916's Edmond Hansen-directed Ålderdom och dårskap, were directed by Victor Sjöström.

== Selected filmography ==
- Hearts That Meet (Swedish: Hjärtan som mötas) (1914)
- Guilt Redeemed (Swedish: Sonad skuld) (1915)
- The Ships That Meet (Swedish: Skepp som mötas) (1916, released posthumously)
