= The Queen of Pellagonia =

1927 film

- Directed by: Sigurd Wallén
- Written by: Henning Ohlson
- Starring: Vera Schmiterlöw; Stina Berg; Carl Gustaf Ekman; Gustaf Lövås
- Cinematography: Axel Lindblom
- Production company: Film AB Minerva
- Distributed by: Skandias Filmbyrå
- Release date: 10 January 1927
- Running time: 92 minutes
- Country: Sweden
- Languages: Silent; Swedish intertitles

The Queen of Pellagonia (Swedish: Drottningen av Pellagonien) is a 1927 Swedish silent comedy film directed by Sigurd Wallén and starring Vera Schmiterlöw, Stina Berg, Carl Gustaf Ekman and Gustaf Lövås. It was shot at the Råsunda Studios in Stockholm. The film's sets were designed by the art director Vilhelm Bryde. The movie was banned in Sweden between 1938 and 1949.

== Cast ==
- Vera Schmiterlöw as Käthie Löwenborg
- Stina Berg as Josefina Pettersson
- Carl Gustaf Ekman as himself
- Felix Grönfeldt as Gösta Salén
- Gustaf Lövås as Jönsson
- Lennart Wallén as Kalle
- Ossian Brofeldt as Sund
- Knut Lambert as Gentleman
- John Melin as Rund
- Kurt Welin as Grund

== Bibliography ==
- Gustafsson, Tommy. Masculinity in the Golden Age of Swedish Cinema: A Cultural Analysis of 1920s Films. McFarland, 2014.
- Qvist, Per Olov & von Bagh, Peter. Guide to the Cinema of Sweden and Finland. Greenwood Publishing Group, 2000.
