= Private Potter =

1962 British film by Caspar Wrede

- Directed by: Casper Wrede
- Screenplay by: Ronald Harwood; Casper Wrede
- Produced by: Ben Arbeid
- Starring: Tom Courtenay; Mogens Wieth; Ronald Fraser; James Maxwell; Frank Finlay
- Cinematography: Arthur Lavis
- Edited by: John Pomeroy
- Music by: George Hall
- Production company: MGM-British Studios
- Distributed by: Metro-Goldwyn-Mayer
- Release date: 1962
- Running time: 89 minutes
- Country: United Kingdom
- Language: English

Private Potter is a 1962 British drama film directed by Caspar Wrede and starring Tom Courtenay, Mogens Wieth, Ronald Fraser and James Maxwell. The screenplay was by Wrede and Ronald Harwood.

== Plot ==
During the Cyprus Emergency (1955–1959) Private Potter is a soldier who claims that the reason he cried out leading to the death of a comrade was that he saw a vision of God. There is then a debate over whether he should be court-martialled.

== Cast ==
- Tom Courtenay as Private Potter
- Mogens Wieth as Yannis
- Ronald Fraser as Doctor
- James Maxwell as Lieutenant Colonel Harry Gunyon
- Ralph Michael as Padre
- Brewster Mason as Brigadier
- Eric Thompson as Captain John Knowles
- John Graham as Major Sims
- Frank Finlay as Captain Patterson
- Harry Landis as Lance Corporal Lamb
- Michael Coles as Private Robertson
- Jeremy Geidt as Major Reid
- Fulton Mackay as soldier

== Production ==
The screenplay was written by Ronald Harwood for a television play that was broadcast on ITV in 1961 featuring some of the same main cast, including Tom Courtenay, and Caspar Wrede again as director. Finnish-born director Wrede first spotted Courtenay while he was still at RADA and the leading role of the fragile young soldier who wilts under pressure was his first film appearance.

== Reception ==
The Monthly Film Bulletin wrote: "Casper Wrede has an eye for composition but lacks, as yet, the ability to use it constructively. Irritatingly inconsistent, he tediously over-emphasises that the slightest sound will ruin the initial military operation, and then allows some fairly noisy conversation among the men and staccato drumbeats behind the actual advance. Deprived even of the sort of significance it could so easily have had as the first sound to pierce a perfectly preserved silence, Potter's cry makes little impact ... This is not the fault of Tom Courtenay, who quickly establishes Potter as a credible human being in the grip of something he doesn't understand. This failure to explore its own theme is the most disappointing thing about a potentially interesting film.

Variety wrote: "The young soldier's character is never clearly defined and the film eventually flounders in speculation and conjecture. The screenplay writers, Ronald Harwood and Caspar Wrede (Wrede has also directed with sensitivity but little compulsion) midway lost the courage of any convictions they may have had when sitting down to their typewriters. Courtenay acts with some imagination but it is to be hoped that he is not going to be typed in these psychological roles. Best performance comes from James Maxwell, as his commanding officer."

The Radio Times Guide to Films gave the film 2/5 stars, writing: "Courtenay is utterly convincing, but Ronald Harwood's script is a sermon few actors could survive. Flashy direction doesn't help matters, either."

Leslie Halliwell wrote "Stilted morality play, unpersuasively made and acted."
