= Brewster Mason =

British actor (1922–1987)

- Born: William Brewster Jesse Victor Mason; 30 August 1922; Kidsgrove, Staffordshire, England
- Died: 14 August 1987 (aged 64); London, England
- Occupation: Actor
- Spouses: Lorna Whittaker (divorced): Kate Meredith
- Children: 1

Brewster Mason (30 August 1922 – 14 August 1987) was an English stage actor who also appeared in films and on television.

He was born in Kidsgrove, Staffordshire and made his stage debut at the Finsbury Park Open Air Theatre in 1947. He then appeared on stage in repertory theatre, in London's West End and on Broadway. He was a member of the Royal Shakespeare Company between 1963 and 1987, and his parts included Earl of Warwick in The Wars of The Roses (1963 and 1964), Claudius in Hamlet opposite David Warner's portrayal of the title character (1965 and 1966), Sir Toby Belch in Twelfth Night (1966), Lafau (in All's Well That Ends Well) and Banquo (in Macbeth) in 1967, Julius Caesar and Falstaff (in The Merry Wives of Windsor) in 1968, Women Beware Women, Wolsey (in Henry VIII) and Falstaff (in When Thou Art King) in 1969, Undershaft in Major Barbara (1970), Othello (1971), Falstaff in Henry IV (1975) and Gaunt in Richard II in 1986. He was an actor of great presence, possessing a distinctive and beautiful voice. He appeared in The Affair in 1962 on Broadway.

He made appearances in many TV series includingThe Pallisers (1974), Quatermass (1979) and Tales of the Unexpected (1980–81). He also played Otto von Bismarck in both Edward the Seventh (1975) and Disraeli (1978). His film appearances included The Dam Busters (1954), as Guy Gibson's rear gunner Flt. Lt. R.D. Trevor-Roper, and Private Potter (1962) as the Brigadier.

In 1957, he had a spell in the BBC's Radio Drama Repertory company when, after an accident in which he injured his leg, he was unable to undertake film or stage work. Appearances during this time included the role of Rupert Dreisler in Paul Temple and the Spencer Affair and as Salty West, an old sea dog in Paul Temple and the Lawrence Affair.

In the late 1960s, early 1970s, and early 1980s he taught classical acting at the University of California, Irvine.

He died aged 64 following a fall when he was appearing in Richard II at the Barbican Theatre in London.

== Filmography ==
Year	Title	Role	Notes
1953	The Elephant Will Never Forget		Uncredited narrator (short film)
1954	The Dam Busters	Flt / Lt. R. D. Trevor-Roper, D.F.C., D.F.M.	
1962	Private Potter	Brigadier	
1977	Secret Army	Father Prior Pierre Moussin	Series 1 Episode 14: Good Friday
1979	The Quatermass Conclusion	Gurov	
