= Miraklet =

1913 film

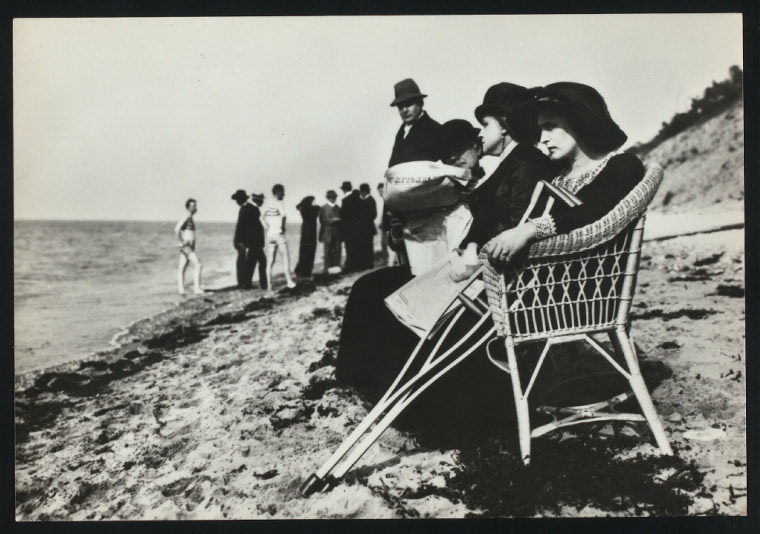
- Directed by: Victor Sjöström
- Written by: Sven Elvestad; Martin Jörgensen; Émile Zola
- Starring: Clara Pontoppidan; Carlo Wieth
- Cinematography: Henrik Jaenzon
- Release date: 1 December 1913
- Running time: 100 minutes
- Country: Sweden
- Languages: Silent; Swedish intertitles

Miraklet (English: The miracle) is a 1913 Swedish silent drama film directed by Victor Sjöström. It is based on the 1894 novel Lourdes by Émile Zola.

== Cast ==
- Jenny Tschernichin-Larsson as Aunt Gaspard
- Clara Pontoppidan as Aunt Gaspard's daughter
- Carlo Wieth as Armand Armand, artist
- John Ekman as Father Prévost
- Justus Hagman as Jean
- Axel Wesslau as Jatho
- Carl Borin
- Alfred Lundberg
