= The Wings (film) =

1916 film by Mauritz Stiller

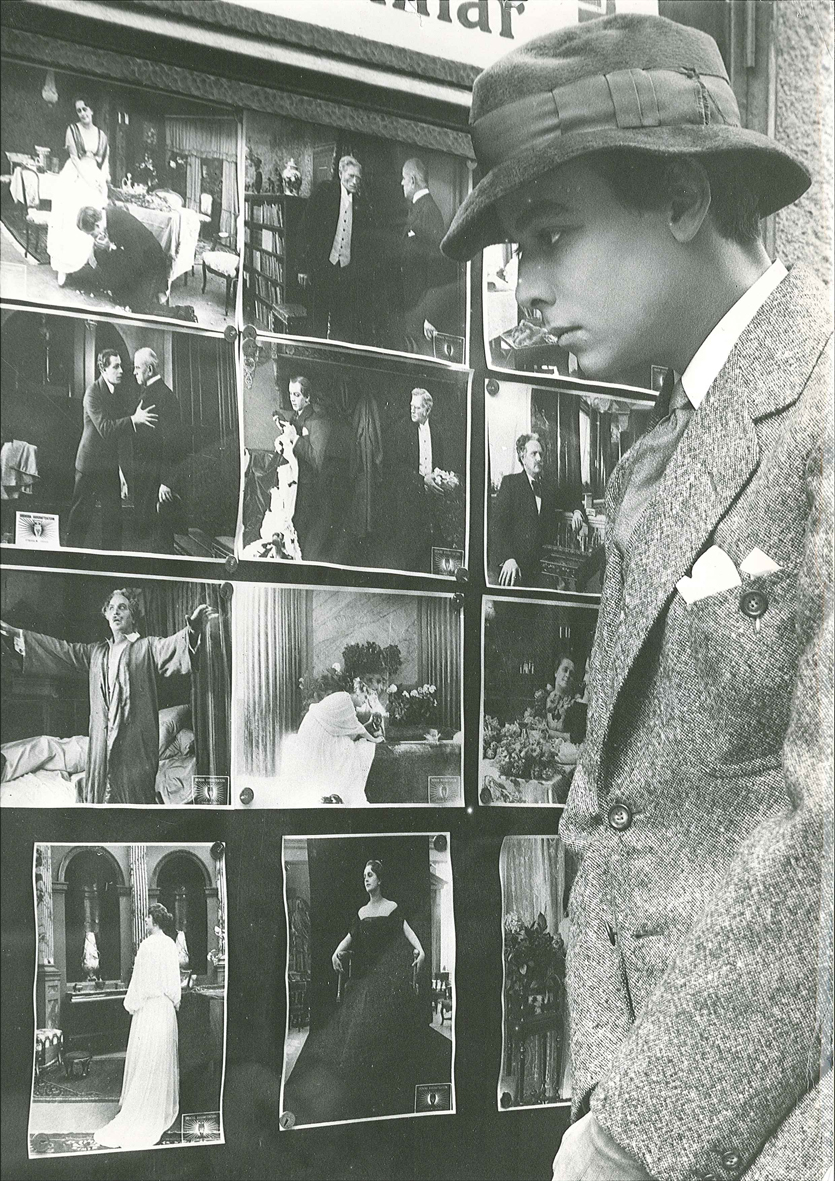
- Nils Asther in the film
- Directed by: Mauritz Stiller
- Written by: Axel Esbensen; Mauritz Stiller
- Based on: 1902 novel Mikaël by Carl Theodor Dreyer
- Starring: Nils Asther; Egil Eide; Lars Hanson; Lili Bech; Julius Hälsig
- Cinematography: Julius Jaenzon
- Distributed by: Svenska Biografteatern
- Release date: 1916
- Running time: 69 minutes
- Country: Sweden
- Language: Silent (Swedish intertitles)

The Wings (Swedish: Vingarne) is a 1916 Swedish silent film directed by Mauritz Stiller, starring Nils Asther, Egil Eide, Lars Hanson, Lili Bech, and Julius Hälsig. It was based on Herman Bang's 1902 novel Mikaël, which was the same source Carl Theodor Dreyer used for his 1924 film Michael.

It has been widely documented as the first known feature with homosexual content. It is also notable for its innovative use of a framing story and telling the plot primarily through the use of flashbacks.

== Plot ==
The story is that of a conniving countess, Lucia De Zamikow, coming between a gay sculptor, Claude Zoret, and his bisexual model and lover, Mikaël. Zoret is a renowned artist who is inspired by a young man he meets in the Scandinavian woods and insists on making a naked sculpture of him. The young man, Mikaël agrees and becomes his apprentice.

Zoret arranges to adopt him, and at the same time Mikaël naivety leads him into a dangerous relationship with Lucia, a patron of Zorets. Zoret feels betrayed by Mikaël and refuses to give him money to fulfill Lucia's hedonistic demands, so Mikaël is forced to sell a copy of the sculpture which Zoret gave him as a gift. Zoret is despondent and dies during a violent storm before his original statue of the naked Mikaël.

== Cast ==
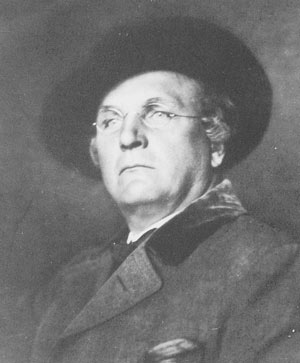
Egil Eide

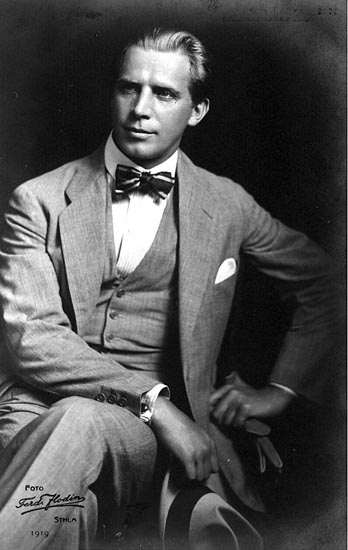
Lars Hanson

- Egil Eide as Claude Zoret
- Lars Hanson as Eugène Mikaël
- Lili Beck as Lucia De Zamikow
- Albin Lavén as Charles Schwitt
- Thure Holm as Läkaren
- Julius Halsig as Artist friend of Zoret
- Bertial Junggren as Artist friend of Zoret
- Alfred Lundberg as Artist friend of Zoret
- Nils Asther as a young actor in the film's frame story
- Julius Jaenzon as himself (the cinematographer)
- Mauritz Stiller as himself (the director)
- Axel Exbensen as himself (the screenwriter)

== Background ==
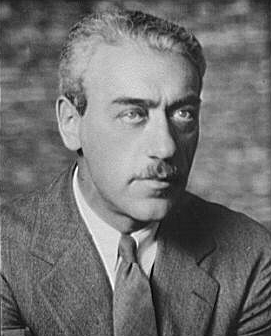
Mauritz Stiller

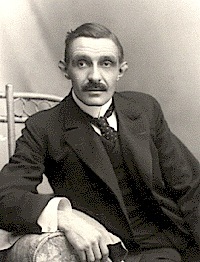
Herman Bang

All of the principal personnel involved with the film were gay, including the author Herman Bang, whose book the film was based on, the director Mauritz Stiller, (Note: According to British film historian Richard Dyer, not only was Stiller gay, but a "flamboyant man about town; in high Stockholm society, he came to be regarded as the smartest man in town, with dozens of bespoke suits, four fur coats and fingers awash with diamond rings." Stiller is best known as the director who made Greta Garbo a star when he cast her in his 1924 film The Atonement of Gosta Berling.) and the screenwriter Axel Esbensen. Although homosexuality was illegal in Sweden in 1916, both the book and the film are "surprisingly frank in their portrayal of the homoeroticism central to the plot.

== Release ==
The film was released in Sweden in 1916. In 2022, the film was prominently featured in the documentary, "Prejudice and Pride", which takes a deep look at queer and trans films from Sweden.

=== Preservation status ===
On 22 September 1941, a fire in the archives of Svenski Filmindustri near Stockholm, destroyed the film's negatives and other material related to the film. However, Swedish film historian Gösta Werner was able to piece together the film's narrative using some frame prints and a script housed at the Library of Congress. Then in 1987, a copy of the main portion of the film came up for auction in Norway, so using the prints from the film and the script, along with the main portion of the film, a version of the film was produced, and premiered at the Swedish Film Institute in 1987.

== Reception ==
Film critic Kevin Thomas wrote "a scholarly dispute continues over whether Stiller's film invokes the legend of Ganymede or Icarus; the first interpretation would imply a gay theme, the second, a straight one; it is not hard to see homosexual implications in this film; those who have seen the work of Stiller, will not be surprised at the subtlety and sophistication of this landmark work." Don Willis of Film Quarterly noted "the 1916 film exemplifies early modernist narrative techniques, which includes running commentary by its director, Mauritz Stiller, the lead actor, Nils Asther, and the cameraman, who directly address the camera."

Critic Peter Rist said that while "this film is noted for its artistic contribution, it does not match the high standards of his later works. Judy Stone wrote in the San Francisco Chronicle that "the Zoret-Mikaël story, a film-within-a-film, is framed by shots of the director and the real actors playing themselves, preparing for and reacting to the film; when the movie was released in Sweden, the audiences were reportedly outraged that Stiller had made the elderly Zoret look like August Strindberg, the great Swedish playwright."

British film critic Richard Dyer opined "the fascination of Vingarne is that it manages to be at once blatant and covert; this might be due to a conscious strategy, since homosexuality was illegal and morally disapproved of; yet it is just as plausible that the film was simply made out of the habits of gay survival, out of the knowledge of how to tread the line between openness and evasion." Author Tommy Gustafsson points out that the film "does not belong to the category of films that openly show homosexuality; instead, the film presents a subtle picture, with secret codes, dual motifs and allusions."

== See also ==
- Cinema of Sweden
- List of Swedish films of the 1910s
- List of LGBTQ-related films pre-1920
- List of incomplete or partially lost films
