= The Flight into Marriage =

1922 film

- Directed by: Artur Retzbach
- Written by: Pola Bauer-Adamara; Else Schmid
- Starring: Gunnar Tolnæs; Carola Toelle; Albert Steinrück
- Cinematography: Alexander Kwartiroff; Friedrich Weinmann
- Production company: Wiking-Film
- Release date: 16 November 1922
- Country: Germany
- Languages: Silent; German intertitles

The Flight into Marriage (German: Die Flucht in die Ehe) is a 1922 German silent film directed by Artur Retzbach and starring Gunnar Tolnæs, Carola Toelle and Albert Steinrück.

The film's sets were designed by the art director Gustav A. Knauer.

== Cast ==
- Gunnar Tolnæs as Graf
- Carola Toelle as Miß
- Albert Steinrück as Onkel
- Fritz Schulz as Sohn
- Stella Arbenina as Witwe
- Paul Biensfeldt as Pfarrer
- Wilhelm Diegelmann as Kutscher
- Josefine Dora as Wirtin
- Vera Hall as Frau des Malers
- Leonhard Haskel as Wirt
- Hans Junkermann as Agent
- Rudolf Klein-Rhoden as Antiquar
- Paul Otto as Arzt
- Albert Paulig as Zuschneider
- Karl Victor Plagge as Hotelportier
- Artur Retzbach as Maler

== Bibliography ==
- Alfred Krautz. International directory of cinematographers, set- and costume designers in film, Volume 4. Saur, 1984.
