= A Matter of Morals =

1961 film

- Theatrical release poster
- Directed by: John Cromwell
- Screenplay by: John D. Hess
- Produced by: John D. Hess; Steve Hopkins
- Starring: Maj-Britt Nilsson; Mogens Wieth; Eva Dahlbeck; Patrick O'Neal; Claes Thelander
- Cinematography: Sven Nykvist
- Edited by: Eric Nordemar
- Music by: Dag Wirén
- Production company: Fortress Films
- Distributed by: United Artists
- Release date: May 31, 1961
- Running time: 90 minutes
- Country: United States
- Language: English

A Matter of Morals is a 1961 American drama film directed by John Cromwell and written by John D. Hess. The film stars Maj-Britt Nilsson, Mogens Wieth, Eva Dahlbeck, Patrick O'Neal and Claes Thelander. The film was released on May 31, 1961, by United Artists.

== Cast ==
- Maj-Britt Nilsson as Anita Andersson
- Mogens Wieth as Erik Walderman
- Eva Dahlbeck as Eva Walderman
- Patrick O'Neal as Alan Kennebeck
- Claes Thelander as Björnson
- Lennart Lindberg as Sven Arborg
- Vernon Young as Mr. Henderson
- Doreen Denning as Mrs. Henderson
- Gösta Cederlund as Curt Eklund
- Hampe Faustman as Kronstad
- Birger Lensander as Taxi Driver
- Per-Axel Arosenius as Taxi Driver
- Tord Peterson as Nightwatch
