= Uncle Frans =

1926 Swedish silent film by Sigurd Wallén

- Directed by: Sigurd Wallén
- Written by: Henning Ohlson
- Based on: Uncle Frans by Jenny Blicher-Clausen
- Starring: Ivan Hedqvist; Inga Tidblad; Richard Lund
- Cinematography: Axel Lindblom
- Production company: Film AB Minerva
- Distributed by: Skandias Filmbyrå
- Release date: 15 March 1926
- Running time: 69 minutes
- Country: Sweden
- Languages: Silent; Swedish intertitles

Uncle Frans (Swedish: Farbror Frans) is a 1926 Swedish historical drama film directed by Sigurd Wallén and starring Ivan Hedqvist, Inga Tidblad and Richard Lund. It was shot at the Råsunda Studios in Stockholm and on location in Gilleleje in Denmark. The film's sets were designed by the art director Vilhelm Bryde.

== Synopsis ==
In the 1880s, an older woman reflects on the events of her life, including her romantic affairs.

== Cast ==
- Ivan Hedqvist as Uncle Frans
- Inga Tidblad as Kaja
- Richard Lund as Peter Dam
- Margita Alfvén as Margareta Solling
- Stina Berg as Housekeeper
- Knut Lambert as Kaja's Father
- Gustaf Lövås as Skater
- Olof Wifstrand as Helle
- Lili Ziedner as Actress

== Bibliography ==
- Gustafsson, Tommy. Masculinity in the Golden Age of Swedish Cinema: A Cultural Analysis of 1920s Films. McFarland, 2014.
- Qvist, Per Olov & von Bagh, Peter. Guide to the Cinema of Sweden and Finland. Greenwood Publishing Group, 2000.
