= The Million Dollars =

1926 film

- Directed by: Sigurd Wallén
- Written by: Henning Ohlson
- Starring: Margita Alfvén; Richard Lund; Axel Hultman
- Cinematography: Axel Lindblom
- Production company: Film AB Minerva
- Distributed by: Svenska Filmkompaniet
- Release date: 8 February 1926
- Running time: 75 minutes
- Country: Sweden
- Languages: Silent; Swedish intertitles

The Million Dollars (Swedish: Dollarmillionen) is a 1926 Swedish silent comedy film directed by Sigurd Wallén and starring Margita Alfvén, Richard Lund and Axel Hultman. It is based on Axel Essén's 1917 novel of the same name, later also turned into a 1942 Finnish film Dollari-miljoona. It was shot at the Råsunda Studios in Stockholm. The film's sets were designed by the art director Vilhelm Bryde.

== Cast ==
- Margita Alfvén as Fylgia Falkman
- Richard Lund as Richard Bergin
- Fredrik Hedlund as Arthur Falkman
- Axel Hultman as Simon Jakobovsky
- Constance Gibson as Mrs. Malla Falkman
- Albert Christiansen as Pricken Falkman
- Elsa Steinvall as Lojan Falkman
- Ivar Kåge as Baron af Segerlind
- Ester Roeck Hansen as Baron's Second Fiancée
- Georg Blomstedt as Drunken job applicant
- Anna Diedrich as Woman with Dog
- Thure Holm as Policeman
- Olof Krook as Process server
- Otto Malmberg as Customs officer
- Isa Quensel as Journalist
- Edla Rothgardt as Seamstress
- Kurt Welin as Job applicant at Jakobovsky's

== Bibliography ==
- Tommy Gustafsson. Masculinity in the Golden Age of Swedish Cinema: A Cultural Analysis of 1920s Films. McFarland, 2014.
