= Mathias Taube =

Swedish actor and artist

- Mathias Taube in the film Johan (1921).
- Born: 21 September 1876; Lindesberg, Sweden
- Died: 23 June 1934 (aged 57); Stockholm, Sweden
- Occupations: Actor, artist
- Years active: 1916–1934
- Spouse: Ella Ekman-Hansen (m. 1911)
- Children: Aino Taube
- Relatives: Evert Taube (cousin)

Mathias ″Mattis″ Taube (21 September 1876 – 23 June 1934) was a Swedish actor and artist. Taube made his film debut in 1916, and came to participate in more than 20 films.

== Biography ==
Mathias Taube was born in Lindesberg on 21 September 1876. He was the son of Axel Taube and Johanna Matilda, born Törnsten. He married on 9 May 1911 in Copenhagen the journalist Ella Ekman-Hansen, with whom he had a daughter and a son, the actor Aino Taube. He was a cousin of Evert Taube, and when Evert came to Stockholm he often stayed with his cousin Mathias. He got there artistic inspiration and was also introduced to the circle of friends of Mathias and his sister Sigrid.

Mathias Taube died on 23 June 1934 in Stockholm.

== Selected filmography ==
- Therèse (1916)
- Kiss of Death (1916)
- The Ships That Meet (1916)
- Johan (1921)
- Flickan från Paradiset (1924)
- The People of Simlang Valley (1924)
- Ingmar's Inheritance (1925)
- First Mate Karlsson's Sweethearts (1925)
- The Rivals (1926)
- Sven Klingas levnadsöde (1926)
- Många femmor små ... (1927)
- The Poetry of Ådalen (1928)
- The Realm of the Rye (1929)
- Hjärtats röst (1930)
- A Night of Love by the Öresund (1931)
- En kvinnas morgondag (1931)
- Värmlänningarna (1932)
- Servant's Entrance (1932)
- Fired (1934)
