= Eidé Norena =

Norwegian soprano (1884–1968)

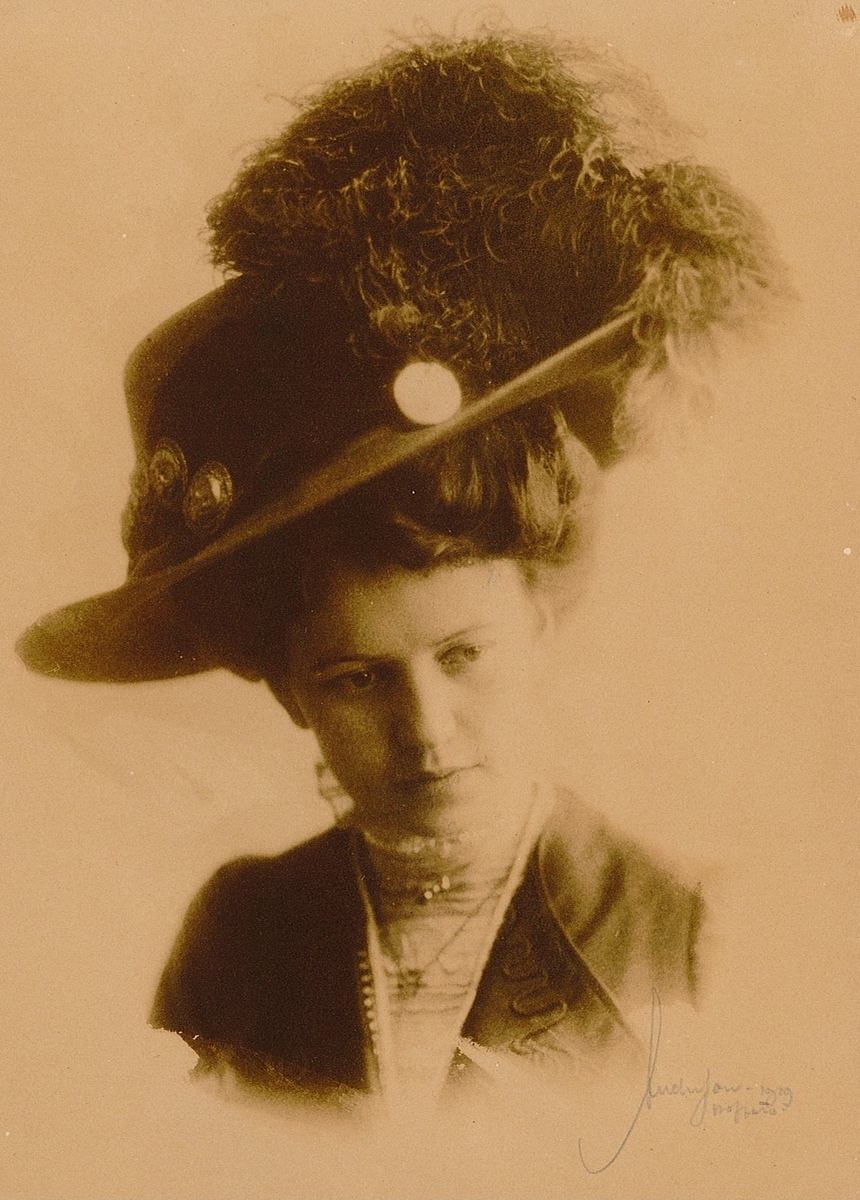
Portrait of Eidé Norena in 1909

Karoline "Kaja" Eide Hansen, known professionally as Eidé Norena (April 26, 1884 – November 13, 1968) was a Norwegian soprano.

Born in Horten, Norena studied in Oslo, Weimar, London, and Paris; her teachers included Ellen Gulbranson and Raimund von zur-Mühlen, and she received advice as well from Nellie Melba. She began her career as a concert singer before making her stage debut in Orfeo ed Euridice in Oslo. Soon thereafter she auditioned for Arturo Toscanini, who hired her to sing at La Scala. She sang at the Royal Opera House for several seasons, and from 1933 to 1938 she appeared at the Metropolitan Opera, making her debut there in La bohème on February 9, 1933. For six seasons she was on the roster of the Chicago Civic Opera. Norena was highly regarded as an actress, having been trained by her onetime husband, Egil Eide, to whom she was married from 1909 until 1939. Highly regarded for her work in Italian roles, she was especially noted for her performances as Gilda and Desdemona. From 1925 to 1940, she lived in Paris. She left Paris in June 1940 before the Wehrmacht's arrival and departed to Geneva. She died in Monthey, Switzerland.

Norena recorded a number of operatic excerpts over the course of her career; many of these performances are still available on compact disc.
