= Prästen =

1914 Swedish silent drama film

- Directed by: Victor Sjöström
- Written by: Peter Lykke-Seest
- Starring: Egil Eide; Clara Wieth
- Cinematography: Hugo Edlund; Julius Jaenzon
- Release date: 16 January 1914
- Running time: 99 minutes
- Country: Sweden
- Languages: Silent; Swedish intertitles

Prästen, also released with English titles of Saints and (Their) Sorrows and The Clergyman, among others, is a 1914 Swedish silent drama film directed by Victor Sjöström.

== Cast ==
- Egil Eide as the priest
- Clara Wieth as Maria, a tenant farmer's daughter
- William Larsson as Maria's father, a tenant farmer
- Richard Lund as a landowner
- Justus Hagman as older priest
- Carlo Wieth as Frans
- Karin Alexandersson
- Jenny Tschernichin-Larsson
- Victor Arfvidson
- Anders Bengtsson
- Anna Thorell
- Anna Bodén
- Carl Borin
- Hedvig Nenzén

== Reception ==
A reviewer in Aftonbladet commented that the film was "splendidly filmed" (flott inspelad) and raised the performances of the male and female leads, Egil Eide and Clara Wieth. The film's English release was praised in the Grimsby Evening Telegraph, with the reviewer commenting that despite a serious subject matter, the film was enjoyable and compelling throughout.
