= Livet måste levas =

- Livet måste levas
- Directed by: Elof Ahrle
- Written by: Theodor Berthels
- Based on: Novel Livet måste levas by Bertil Johnson (pseudonym for Theodor Berthels)
- Starring: Oscar Ljung
- Edited by: Tage Holmberg
- Production company: AB Svea Film
- Distributed by: AB Svea Film
- Release date: September 27, 1943 (Sweden)
- Running time: 84 minutes
- Country: Sweden
- Language: Swedish

Livet måste levas (English: Life must be lived) is a Swedish film from 1943 directed by Elof Ahrle.

The film is based on a novel by the same name written by Bertil Johnson (pseudonym for Theodor Berthels). The film was photographed by Sten Dahlgren edited by Tage Holmberg. AB Svea Film was the production and distribution company. At 84 minutes long, the film premiered on 27 September 1943 at various theaters in Stockholm, Gothenburg, Linköping and Norrköping in Sweden and was classified suitable for 15-year-olds and older.

Livet måste levas was played between April and June 1943 in Centrumateljéerna in Stockholm.

== Plot ==
The seaman Gustaf (Oscar Ljung) has just returned to Stockholm, the city where he grew up but has not been in 14 years. He longs to see his apartment in which he grew up and he travels there. In which the family Berglund now resides Berglund and Mrs. Ella opens and shows him around. When her husband Sven (Tord Bernheim) learns that she has had a visit from a man during the day he becomes enraged whereupon Ella flees from him. She heads towards Gustav but is soon sought out by her husband, threatening her with a gun. Gustaf beat him to the ground and he later dies in a hospital. Gustaf is acquitted by the court when he is deemed to have acted in self-defense. He and Ella becomes romantically involved.

== Rollista ==
- Oscar Ljung – Gustaf Blom, seaman
- Elof Ahrle – Karl Hansson, seaman
- Elsie Albiin – Ella Berglund
- Tord Bernheim – Sven Berglund
- Marianne Löfgren – Elvira Persson
- Hilda Borgström – Mrs. Nilsson
- Julia Cæsar – Mrs. Olsson
- Douglas Håge – Hamberg, Chief Inspector

== Reception ==
The film was considered by most reviews to be told straightforwardlya and uncontrived, albeit slightly awkwardly. The script however was seen as substandard.
