= Melody of the Sea =

1934 film

- Directed by: John W. Brunius; Prince Vilhelm of Sweden
- Written by: Eric Roos
- Starring: Carl Ström; Greta Almroth; Sigge Fürst
- Cinematography: Adrian Bjurman; Per Flood
- Edited by: Adrian Bjurman
- Music by: David Ottoson
- Production company: Tullbergs Film
- Distributed by: Tullbergs Film
- Release date: 16 February 1934
- Running time: 85 minutes
- Country: Sweden
- Language: Swedish

Melody of the Sea (Swedish: Havets melodi) is a 1934 Swedish drama film directed by John W. Brunius and starring Carl Ström, Greta Almroth and Sigge Fürst. Prince Vilhelm of Sweden co-directed the film. It was shot at the Sundbyberg Studios of Europa Film in Stockholm and on location around Gothenburg and Grisslehamn. It revolves around the few people on an island, including those living in its lighthouse. Fisherman Lars Persson's only child, Karin, and the lighthouse master pilot Anders Bergström's son Arne love each other. Their fathers' past rivalry for the affections of the same girl could create hurdles for their union.

== Cast ==
- Carl Ström as Lars Persson
- Greta Almroth as Mrs. Anna Persson
- Britta Jacobsson as Karin Persson
- Harry Bergvall as Anders Bergström
- Martha Colliander as Malin
- Sigge Fürst as Arne Andersson
- Palle Brunius as Bengt Hamberg
- Sven Andersson as Chef at Vinga Fireship
- Anna-Lisa Baude as Fagerlund's wife
- Folke Brandt as Fireman on Vinga Fireship
- Anna-Lisa Fröberg as Supervisor
- John Hilke as Captain
- Rudolf Karlsson as Fireman at Vinga lighthouse
- Nils Lundell as Fagerlund the machinist
- Nils Sandgren as Fireman on Vinga Fireship
- Nils Ström as director of Vinga Fireship
- Anton Wik as Fireman on Vinga Fireship

== Bibliography ==
- Sadoul, Georges. Dictionary of Film Makers. University of California Press, 1972.
