= A Ruined Life =

1912 film

- Directed by: Victor Sjöström
- Starring: Hilda Borgström; Einar Fröberg; Anna Norrie; Richard Lund
- Release date: 14 October 1912
- Country: Sweden
- Languages: Silent; Swedish intertitles

A Ruined Life (Swedish: Ett hemligt giftermål eller Bekännelsen på dödsbädden) is a 1912 Swedish silent film directed by Victor Sjöström. It was Sjöström's debut film as a director.

== Plot ==
Georg, the son of a wealthy colonel, is secretly married to the poor Helena, with whom he has a three-year-old son. Though he is happy with his marriage, he hides it from the rest of his family, afraid that they would react poorly to Helena's status. One day, Georg competes in a steeplechase and is on the verge of winning, but crashes into the final obstacle and is fatally injured. On his deathbed, he reveals his marriage to his father, who promises to care for them after Georg's death.

Four years later, Helena and her son have settled into the colonel's home. However, Georg's brother-in-law attempts to drive them out, viewing them as a disgrace to the family's reputation and not wanting to share the colonel's eventual inheritance. Helena eventually acquiesces and moves out with her son; they subsequently face financial difficulties and Helena accepts the colonel's offer to adopt her son. She struggles to deal with her resulting loneliness, and abducts her son one day when he is out with his nanny. During the ensuing manhunt, she attempts to drown herself and her son, but they are rescued. Helena is charged with attempted murder and sentenced to prison.

After another 14 years have passed, Georg and Helena's son celebrates his 21st birthday with his family; they are proud that he has become a colonel like his grandfather. He has only vague memories of his mother, who has just been released from prison. She has difficulty finding a job as a domestic worker and is driven away by the police when she tries to lie down on a park bench. Exhausted, she loses consciousness and collapses, and is mocked by schoolchildren. Her son, who is passing by, sees the incident and carries Helena to his house, unaware that she is his mother. Once they arrive home, she is identified as his mother and they joyfully reconcile, vowing to never again be separated.

== Cast ==
- Hilda Borgström as Helena
- Einar Fröberg as Georg's father, the colonel
- Anna Norrie as Georg's mother
- Richard Lund as Georg
- Bergliot Husberg as Georg's sister
- John Ekman as Georg's brother-in-law
- Greta Almroth as the nanny
- Victor Arfvidson
- Erland Colliander
- Eric Lindholm

== Production and release ==
A Ruined Life was filmed during July and August 1912 at the Svenska Bio headquarters in Lidingö, under the working title En moder (A Mother). The steeplechase scenes were filmed in Gärdet, Stockholm. The film premiered at the Cosmorama theatre in Gothenburg on 14 October 1912. It was the debut film of director Victor Sjöström; although The Gardener was filmed earlier that summer, it was censored and not publicly screened in Sweden until 1980. A Ruined Life was also the debut film of actors Greta Almroth and Richard Lund, both of whom would later star in many more Svenska Bio films. The Stockholm premiere took place at the Röda Kvarn theatre on 25 November 1912; it was accompanied by music arranged by Gustav Erbs and performed by the Röda Kvarn orchestra, with Erbs as conductor. The film's Danish premiere took place a year later on 30 December 1913, at the Victoria Theater in Copenhagen.

== Reception ==
The film received mixed reviews from critics. One review in Social-Demokraten praised Borgström's (Helena's) performance as "utomordentligt och gripande" (extraordinary and gripping), with the exception of the scene in which Helena is rescued from the lake. A reviewer for Dagens Nyheter disagreed, describing Borgström's performance in the lake scene as being filled with "överväldigande intensitet" (overwhelming intensity). Several reviews, including Aftonbladet and Nya Dagligt Allehanda, criticized the screenplay as poorly constructed or mundane, while Sydsvenskan wrote more positively, considering it an example of high-quality Swedish cinema.
