= Mogens Wieth =

Danish actor (1919–1962)

- Born: 16 September 1919; Copenhagen, Denmark
- Died: 10 September 1962 (aged 42); London, England
- Occupation: Actor
- Years active: 1940–1962

Mogens Wieth (16 September 1919 – 10 September 1962) was a Danish film actor. He appeared in more than 20 films between 1940 and 1962. He was born in Copenhagen, Denmark to stage and film actors Carlo Wieth and Agnes Thorberg Wieth, and he died in London, England in 1962.

== Selected filmography ==
- Flådens blå matroser (1937) – Radiotelegrafist på lystyachten
- The Child (1940) – Pontus
- Come Home with Me (1941) – Tømrer Asmus Asmussen
- Regnen holdt op (1942) – Ung mand
- Natekspressen P903 (1942) – Kriminalassistent Otto Warholt
- En herre i kjole og hvidt (1942) – Erik Rask
- Jeg mødte en morder (1943) – Gårdejer Henrik Nielsen
- Drama på slottet (1943) – Kammerjunker Frederich von Kötschau
- Mit liv er musik (1944) – Erik Smith
- Den usynlige hær (1945) – Poul
- Ditte, Child of Man (1946) – Fortælleren
- The Swedenhielm Family (1947) – Løjtnant Bo Swedenhielm
- Hatten er sat (1947) – Allan Moller
- Mens porten var lukket (1948) – Torsten Haugnæs
- Kampen mod uretten (1949) – Peter Sabroe
- For frihed og ret (1949) – Orla Leehmann
- Aila, Pohjolan tytär (1951) – Harm, American writer
- The Tales of Hoffmann (1951) – Crespel
- 24 timer (1951) – Hugo Strand
- Som sendt fra himlen (1951) – Allan / Alfred Kragh
- Arthurs forbrytelse (1955) – Akim Taroff
- The Man Who Knew Too Much (1956) – Ambassador
- Tante Tut fra Paris (1956) – Claus Hiller
- Ingen tid til kærtegn (1957) – Himself
- A Matter of Morals (1961) – Erik Walderman
- Gøngehøvdingen (1961) – Frederik III
- Private Potter (1962) – Yannis (final film role)
