= Skepp som mötas =

1916 film

- Directed by: Victor Sjöström
- Written by: Kai Holberg
- Starring: Lili Bech
- Cinematography: Henrik Jaenzon
- Release date: 10 January 1916
- Running time: 46 minutes
- Country: Sweden
- Languages: Silent; Swedish intertitles

Skepp som mötas (English: Ships that meet) is a 1916 Swedish silent drama film directed by Victor Sjöström. The film was shot when Lili Bech was still married to Sjöström. They divorced in 1916.

== Cast ==
- Lili Bech as Ethel
- Egil Eide as John Hall
- Mathias Taube as Dr. Hiller
- August Warberg as Cramer
