= Stina Berg =

Swedish actress (1869–1930)

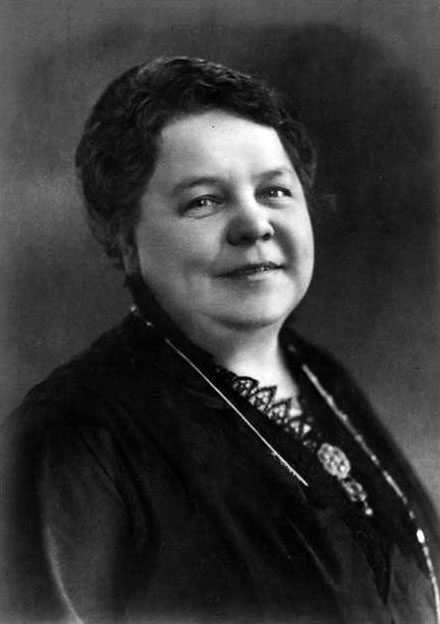
- Born: 21 October 1869; Stockholm, Sweden
- Died: 5 October 1930 (aged 60); Stockholm, Sweden
- Occupation: Actress
- Years active: 1912–1930
- Spouse: Martin Karlsson

Stina Berg (21 October 1869 – 5 October 1930) was a Swedish silent film actress. She appeared in more than 40 films between 1912 and 1931. She was also a stage actress, appearing in revues and folklustspel productions. She was married to actor Martin Karlsson until her death at Maria Hospital, Stockholm.

== Selected filmography ==
- Löjen och tårar (1913) directed by Victor Sjöström
- Gatans barn (1914)
- Sonad skuld (1915)
- The Price of Betrayal (1915)
- Andersson's Kalle (1922)
- The Blizzard (1923) directed by Mauritz Stiller
- Her Little Majesty (1925)
- A Sister of Six (1926)
- Uncle Frans (1926)
- His English Wife (1927)
- The Queen of Pellagonia (1927)
- Sealed Lips (1927)
- Sin (1928)
- Jansson's Temptation (1928)
- Say It with Music (1929)
- Charlotte Löwensköld (1930)
- For Her Sake (1930)
- The People of Norrland (1930)
- Cavaliers of the Crown (1930)
- Colourful Pages (1931)
