= Therèse (1916 film) =

1916 film

- Directed by: Victor Sjöström
- Starring: Lili Bech
- Cinematography: Henrik Jaenzon
- Release date: 2 October 1916
- Running time: 55 minutes
- Country: Sweden
- Languages: Silent; Swedish intertitles

Therèse is a 1916 Swedish silent drama film directed by Victor Sjöström, starring his then wife Lili Bech.

== Cast ==
- Lili Bech as Therèse
- Josua Bengtsson as Detective
- Lars Hanson as Gerhard
- Albin Lavén as Rell
- Albert Ståhl as Donne
- Robert Sterling as Ramb
- Mathias Taube as Kembell
- Jenny Tschernichin-Larsson as Therese's Mother
