= Hjärtan som mötas =

1914 film

- Directed by: Victor Sjöström
- Written by: Edvin Berndtson
- Starring: Greta Almroth
- Cinematography: Henrik Jaenzon
- Release date: 30 November 1914
- Running time: 38 minutes
- Country: Sweden
- Languages: Silent; Swedish intertitles

Hjärtan som mötas (English: Hearts that meet) is a 1914 Swedish silent drama film directed by Victor Sjöström.

== Cast ==
- Greta Almroth - Albert's Sister
- John Ekman
- Alfred Lundberg - Eberling
- Richard Lund - Engineer
- Karin Molander - Margot
- Jenny Tschernichin-Larsson - Mrs. Ström
- August Warberg
- Carlo Wieth - Albert
