= Her Little Majesty (1925 film) =

1925 film

- Directed by: Sigurd Wallén
- Written by: Karl Gerhard (play); Henning Ohlson
- Starring: Margita Alfvén; Gunnar Tolnæs; Stina Berg
- Cinematography: Axel Lindblom
- Production company: Film AB Minerva
- Distributed by: Deutsch-Nordische Film-Union (Germany)
- Release date: 7 September 1925
- Running time: 73 minutes
- Country: Sweden
- Languages: Silent; Swedish intertitles

Her Little Majesty (Swedish: Hennes lilla majestät) is a 1925 Swedish silent comedy drama film directed by Sigurd Wallén and starring Margita Alfvén, Gunnar Tolnæs and Stina Berg. It was shot at the Råsunda Studios in Stockholm. The film's sets were designed by the art director Vilhelm Bryde. It was remade as a 1939 film of the same title.

== Cast ==
- Margita Alfvén as Catherine
- Gunnar Tolnæs as Priest
- Oscar Textorius as Catherine's Father
- Stina Berg as Housekeeper
- Ragnar Billberg as Actor 'The First Lover'
- Carl Browallius as Bishop
- Olga Andersson as Actress
- Ragnar Arvedson as Flachert
- John Borgh
- Gucken Cederborg as Actress
- Julia Cæsar as Train passenger
- Felix Grönfeldt
- Eric Gustafson
- Thure Holm
- Axel Jacobsson
- Gustaf Lövås as Actor
- Olav Riégo as Lieutenant
- Albert Ståhl as Landfiskal
- Wilhelm Tunelli
- Signe Törneqvist
- Carl-Gunnar Wingård as Actor

== Bibliography ==
- Per Olov Qvist & Peter von Bagh, Guide to the Cinema of Sweden and Finland. Greenwood Publishing Group, 2000.
