= The Gardener (1912 film) =

1912 film

- Directed by: Victor Sjöström
- Written by: Mauritz Stiller
- Starring: Victor Sjöström
- Cinematography: Julius Jaenzon
- Release dates: 17 October 1912 (Denmark); 14 October 1980 (Sweden)
- Running time: 34 minutes
- Country: Sweden
- Languages: Silent; Swedish intertitles

The Gardener (Swedish: Trädgårdsmästaren) is a 1912 Swedish silent drama film directed by Victor Sjöström. It is mostly known for being the first film to ever be banned by the Swedish censor system. It was long thought to have been lost, but in 1979 a copy was found at the Library of Congress in the United States.

The Swedish premiere followed on 14 October 1980 when it was shown at Cinemateket/Bio Victor in Stockholm.

== Plot ==
A gardener (Sjöström) runs a farm, and his son (Gösta Ekman) has fallen in love with the daughter of one of the farm workers (Lili Bech). The gardener, who has an interest in the daughter himself, furiously runs the son out of the house. One day, the gardener rapes the worker's daughter and then sends her and her father (Gunnar Bohman) away, fearing discovery.

While on a boat on the way into the city, the two meet an old general (John Ekman) who gives the girl money and his business card. When the father later dies, the girl reaches out to the general, who lets her act as a hostess at his dinner parties. Soon after, the general suffers a seizure and upon his death, his family and friends kick the girl out.

The devastated girl returns to her home village. Distraught, she visits the greenhouse where she pulls out all the flowers and curses the gardener. The next morning, the gardener finds her dead among the roses.

== Production and censorship ==
The Gardener was filmed during July and August 1912 at the studio of the Swedish Cinematic Theatre in Lidingö with outdoor scenes taking place as Nackanäs inn and surroundings at Järla and Sickla lakes, as well as aboard the cruise ship Nackanäs I. Cinematography was headed by Julius Jaenzon. Although A Ruined Life is considered to be his debut film, as it was the first to premiere, The Gardener was Sjöström's debut production as director. His past experience in film was limited to a few cinema visits which is why he, along with Charles Magnusson, visited the studios of Pathé Frères in Paris as a learning experience.

Claiming the film was contrary to "good practices" and for embellishing death, the film was banned from public screenings by Swedish authorities on 20 August 1912. In an attempt to appeal the ban, a special screening with Prime Minister Karl Staaff and other ministers was arranged. The censors' decision was upheld.

The Gardener premiered on 17 October 1912 at the Victoria-Teatret in Copenhagen.

== Cast ==
- Victor Sjöström - the gardener
- Gösta Ekman - the gardener's son
- Lili Bech - the girl
- Gunnar Bohman - the girl's father
- John Ekman - the general
- Mauritz Stiller - boat passenger

== Distribution titles ==
The Swedish Film Database lists the film as having distribution titles in five different languages, other than the original Swedish title:

- Et Offer for sin Ungdomskærlighed (Denmark)
- Offer for sin Kjærlighed (Norway)
- The Broken Spring Rose (USA)
- Brutna vårblomster (Finland)
- Taittuneita kevätkukkia (Finland)
