= The Price of Betrayal =

1915 film

- Directed by: Victor Sjöström
- Written by: Axel Frische
- Starring: Gabriel Alw
- Cinematography: Henrik Jaenzon; Julius Jaenzon
- Release date: 16 November 1915
- Running time: 40 minutes
- Country: Sweden
- Languages: Silent; Swedish intertitles

L'argent de Judas, a Swiss version of The Price of Betrayal with French and German intertitles

The Price of Betrayal (Swedish: Judaspengar) is a 1915 Swedish silent drama film directed by Victor Sjöström. The 40-minute film was presumed lost until a nearly complete copy was located in 2017.

== Cast ==
- Gabriel Alw
- Stina Berg
- Egil Eide as Blom
- Kaja Eide as Mrs. Blom
- John Ekman as Mr. Holck
