= Lili Bech =

Danish actress

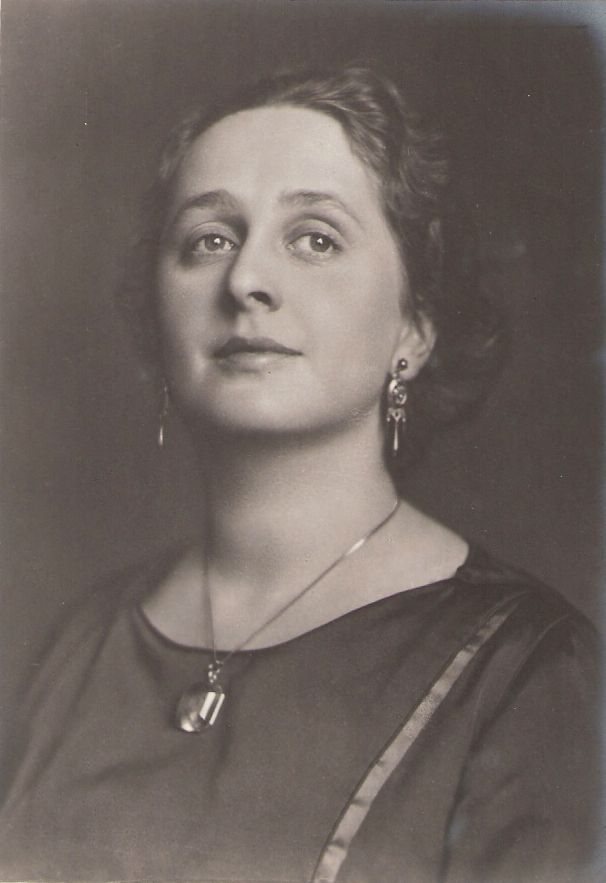
- Born: Lily Beck; 29 December 1883; Copenhagen, Denmark
- Died: 20 January 1939 (aged 55); Århus, Denmark
- Occupation: Actress
- Years active: 1905 - 1917
- Spouse(s): Erik Magnussen (1912-1912); Victor Sjöström (1914-1916)

Lili Bech (born Lily Beck; 29 December 1883 – 20 January 1939) was a Danish silent film actress. She appeared in 27 films between 1911 and 1917. She was briefly married to film director Victor Sjöström.

== Selected filmography ==
- The Gardener (1912)
- Gatans barn (1914)
- Daughter of the Peaks (1914)
- Sonad skuld (1915)
- The Wings (1916)
- The Ships That Meet (1916)
- Therèse (1916)
