= Sonad skuld =

1915 Swedish silent drama film

- Directed by: Victor Sjöström
- Written by: Victor Sjöström
- Starring: Lili Bech
- Cinematography: Henrik Jaenzon
- Release date: 15 February 1915
- Running time: 48 minutes
- Country: Sweden
- Languages: Silent; Swedish intertitles

Sonad skuld is a 1915 Swedish silent drama film written and directed by Victor Sjöström.

== Cast ==
- Lili Bech as Margareta Stensson
- Gustaf Callmén as Margareta's father; a farm owner
- Carlo Wieth as Margareta's brother
- John Ekman as factory manager
- Viggo Friderichsen as Albin Ström, engineer
- August Warberg as a farm owner
- Greta Almroth as farm owner's daughter
- Stina Berg as farm owner's wife
