= Henning Ohlson =

Swedish playwright and screenwriter

- Born: 15 July 1884; Kinstaby, Sweden
- Died: 3 January 1941; Stockholm, Sweden
- Occupation: Writer

Henning Ohlson (1884–1941) was a Swedish playwright and screenwriter.

== Selected filmography ==
- Her Little Majesty (1925)
- The Million Dollars (1926)
- Uncle Frans (1926)
- The Queen of Pellagonia (1927)
- Jansson's Temptation (1928)
- The Poetry of Ådalen (1928)
- Ocean Breakers (1935)

== Bibliography ==
- Chandler, Charlotte. Ingrid: Ingrid Bergman, A Personal Biography. Simon and Schuster, 2007.
