= Högfjällets dotter =

1914 film

- Film poster
- Directed by: Victor Sjöström
- Starring: Greta Almroth; Victor Sjöström; Lili Bech
- Cinematography: Henrik Jaenzon
- Release date: 16 November 1914
- Running time: 32 minutes
- Country: Sweden
- Languages: Silent; Swedish intertitles

Högfjällets dotter is a 1914 Swedish silent drama film directed by Victor Sjöström. It starred Greta Almroth, one of the first major stars of Swedish cinema.

== Plot ==
Karl Werner, a young doctor, is found unconscious in the mountains by a Sámi girl, Waina. She brings him to her village to recover. Werner and Waina fall in love, but he is retrieved by his friends, who take him back to the city, where he takes a position as a junior physician. Over time, Werner moves on from Waina, falling in love with a nurse. Unbeknownst to him, Waina gave birth to his child, which causes her to be ostracised by her family. She travels to the city, only to discover that the doctor has forgotten her. Seeking shelter, she spends the night at a construction site, where she is seriously injured. Waina is admitted to hospital by ambulance, where Werner is the one to take care of her. The nurse, his new fiancée, discovers the relationship and breaks off their engagement. Accepting his responsibility, Werner commits to taking care of Waina and their child.

== Cast ==
- Victor Sjöström as Karl Werner, a young doctor
- Greta Almroth as Waina, a Sámi girl
- Lili Bech as nurse
- John Ekman as Nordman, Waina's father
- Arvid Englind as Werner's friend
- William Larsson as Werner's friend
- Jenny Tschernichin-Larsson as Karl's mother
