= Gatans barn =

1914 Swedish silent drama film

- Directed by: Victor Sjöström
- Written by: Poul Knudsen
- Starring: Lili Bech; Gunnar Tolnæs
- Cinematography: Henrik Jaenzon
- Release date: 19 October 1914
- Running time: 54 minutes
- Country: Sweden
- Languages: Silent; Swedish intertitles

Gatans barn (lit. 'Street children') is a 1914 Swedish silent drama film directed by Victor Sjöström. It premiered on 19 October 1914. The lead roles were played by Lili Bech and Gunnar Tolnæs. A review in Svenska Dagbladet described the film as "sad and dramatic...ends with a suicide, well-filmed and well-directed" (sorgligt och dramatiskt och slutar med själfmord, väl inspeladt och med god regi).

== Cast ==
- Lili Bech as Jenny: waitress at "'Gyllene ankaret''
- Gunnar Tolnæs as Karl Sterner: journalist
- Sven Bergvall as a young journalist
- Gustaf Callmén as a politician
- Jenny Tschernichin-Larsson as politician's wife
- Emil Bergendorff as politician
- Stina Berg as party guest
- John Ekman as a member of the group at "Gyllene ankaret''
