= Egil Eide =

Norwegian actor (1868–1946)

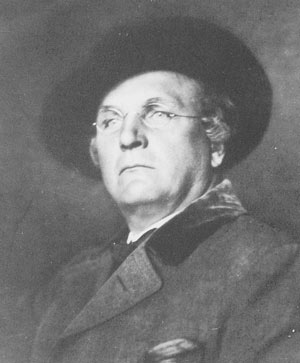
- Eide as Dr. Stockmann in Ibsen's; An Enemy of the People.
- Born: Egil Næss Eide; 24 August 1868; Haugesund, Norway
- Died: 13 December 1946 (aged 78); Haugesund, Norway
- Occupations: Actor, film director
- Years active: 1894–1939 (theater); 1913–1935 (film)
- Spouse: Eidé Norena (divorced)

Egil Næss Eide (24 August 1868 – 13 December 1946) was a Norwegian silent film actor and director. He appeared in eighteen films between 1913 and 1935, and worked at the National Theatre between 1899 and 1939.

== Career ==
He was born in Haugesund as a son of ship-owner Ludolf Eide (1821–1908) and Albertine Knagenhjelm Wiese (1834–1903). He was an uncle of zoologist Albert Eide Parr. After finishing his secondary education, Eide lived in the United States until 1894, where he went through his first marriage. Back in Norway, he made his state debut in 1894 at Den Nationale Scene. He was hired at Christiania Theater in 1898, and when it went defunct one year later he moved to the new National Theatre. He played many notable roles, both internationally known roles like Romeo, Othello, King Lear and Oedipus, but also in plays by the Nordic writers Henrik Ibsen, Bjørnstjerne Bjørnson and August Strindberg, including the title role in the first Norwegian performance (in 1904) of Ibsen's play Brand. Brand, published as far back as in 1866, had previously been staged in Sweden.

He made his silent film debut in Sweden in 1913, and later played in films such as The Clergyman (1914), The Price of Betrayal (1915), The Wings (1916) and The Ships That Meet (1916). He also directed two films. He faced declining health in the 1930s, and finished his on-screen career with two Norwegian films in 1932 and 1935. He left the National Theatre in 1939. Also in 1939, his marriage to singer Kaja Eide Norena since 1909 was dissolved.

In the 1927 Norwegian parliamentary election he was the sixth ballot candidate for the party National Legion.

In 1919 he was decorated as a Knight, First Class of the Royal Norwegian Order of St. Olav. He died in December 1946 in Haugesund.

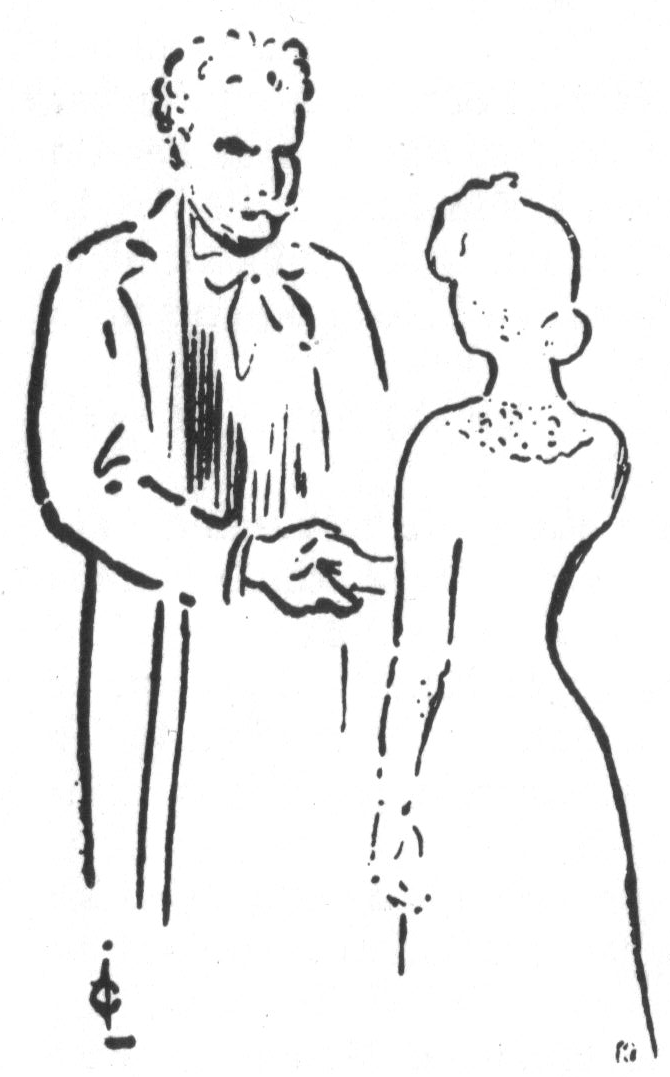
Egil Eide as Brodersen, with Johanne Dybwad in Gunnar Heiberg's Kjærlighet til næsten (1903). Drawn by Gustav Lærum.
