= Greta Almroth =

Swedish actress (1888–1981)

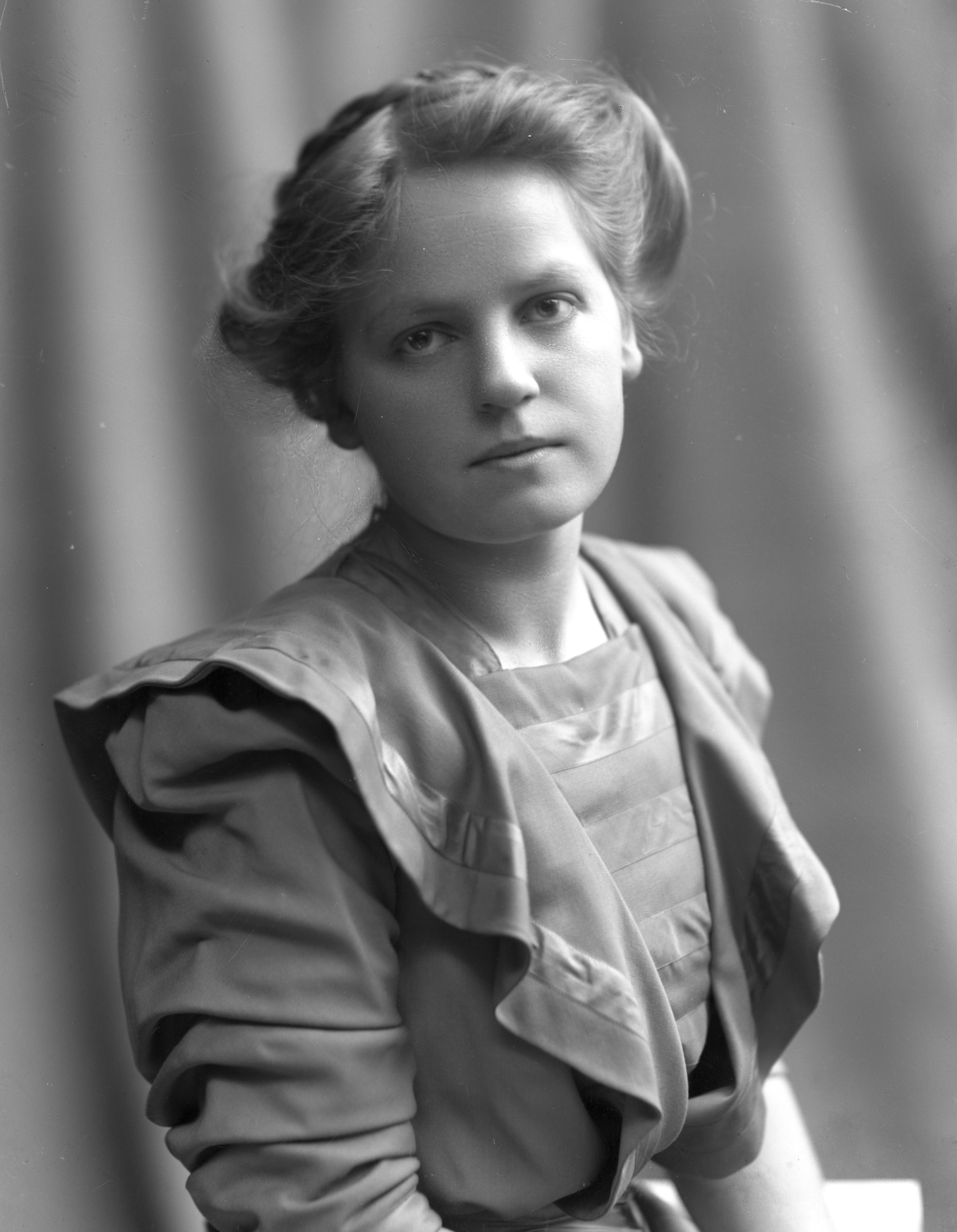
- Greta Almroth (c. 1905)
- Born: 15 April 1888; Stockholm, Sweden
- Died: 24 July 1981 (aged 93); Stockholm, Sweden
- Resting place: Norra begravningsplatsen
- Occupation: Actor
- Years active: 1912-1940

Greta Almroth (15 April 1888 – 24 July 1981) was a Swedish silent film actress. She appeared in 31 films between 1912 and 1940.

Almroth studied at Elin Svensson's theatre school and made her stage debut in 1908. She was one of the first major stars of Swedish cinema, appearing in more than 30 films. After The People of Simlang Valley in 1924, Almroth took a decade-long break from film, spending a few years in the United States and then touring the stages of major rural towns with Knut Lindroth. She was a member of the women's association Nya Idun.

She is buried at Norra begravningsplatsen in Stockholm.

== Selected filmography ==
- A Ruined Life (1912)
- Blodets röst (1913)
- Judge Not (1914)
- Högfjällets dotter (1914)
- Hearts That Meet (1914)
- Sonad skuld (1915)
- The Sea Vultures (1916)
- The Lass from the Stormy Croft (1917)
- His Lordship's Last Will (1919)
- The Parson's Widow (1920)
- A Lover in Pawn (1920)
- The People of Simlang Valley (1924)
- Melody of the Sea (1934)
- John Ericsson, Victor of Hampton Roads (1937)
- Good Friends and Faithful Neighbours (1938)
- Västkustens hjältar (1940)
