= John Ekman =

Swedish actor (1880–1949)

- Born: 15 November 1880; Stockholm, Sweden
- Died: 22 November 1949 (aged 69); Karlstad, Sweden
- Occupation: Actor
- Years active: 1912–1949

John Ekman (15 November 1880 – 22 November 1949) was a Swedish film actor.

== Biography ==
He first trained as an artist under Richard Bergh (1858–1919). He was employed by various theater companies; Swedish Biograft Theater in Kristianstad (1911–1917), Lorensbergsteatern in Gothenburg (1918–1923) and Helsingborgs stadsteater in Helsingborg (1923–1928) and from 1928 again at Lorensbergsteatern. He also appeared in 81 films between 1912 and 1949.

== Selected filmography ==
- A Ruined Life (1912)
- The Gardener (1912)
- Blodets röst (1913)
- Half Breed (1913)
- The Miracle (1913)
- Judge Not (1914)
- The Strike (1914)
- Gatans barn (1914)
- Daughter of the Peaks (1914)
- Hearts That Meet (1914)
- Sonad skuld (1915)
- The Price of Betrayal (1915)
- The Sea Vultures (1916)
- The Outlaw and His Wife (1918)
- The Phantom Carriage (1921)
- The Suitor from the Highway (1923)
- Johan Ulfstjerna (1923)
- Ingmar's Inheritance (1925)
- Kalle Utter (1925)
- Sin (1928)
- Black Rudolf (1928)
- Hotel Paradis (1931)
- Man's Way with Women (1934)
- The Atlantic Adventure (1934)
- Synnöve Solbakken (1934)
- Baldwin's Wedding (1938)
- The People of Högbogården (1939)
- The Fight Continues (1941)
- Lasse-Maja (1941)
- General von Döbeln (1942)
- Count Only the Happy Moments (1944)
- Black Roses (1945)
- The Serious Game (1945)
- The Rose of Tistelön (1945)
- Each Heart Has Its Own Story (1948)
- Carnival Evening (1948)
- Big Lasse of Delsbo (1949)
- Love Wins Out (1949)
- To Joy (1950)
