= Oscar Byström (composer) =

Swedish composer (1821–1909)

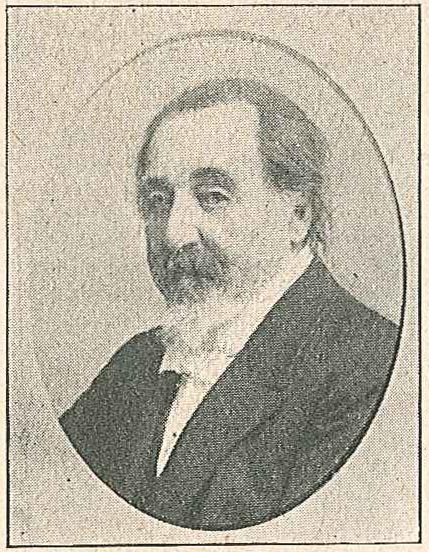
Oscar Byström.

Oscar Fredrik Bernadotte Byström (13 October 1821 – 22 July 1909) was a Swedish composer and scholar.

Born in Stockholm into the family of a military officer, he followed his father in a military career and rose to the rank of captain by 1857. However, already in the 1840s he gained recognition as both a pianist and song composer, and by late 1850 Byström was active as a teacher. In 1866 he was appointed inspector of the Swedish Royal Academy of Music, succeeding August Berwald. He became a professor at the Academy in 1872, and also worked for several years as conductor of the orchestral society of Turku.

Byström's first published work appeared in 1871: Allmän musiklära, till skolornas tjenst, intended for schools. After his return to Stockholm from Turku, he devoted himself to studying church music. He traveled to London, Paris, Solesmes, Milan and Rome to this end, and upon his return to Stockholm, Byström started organizing regular performances of liturgical music by Orlando di Lasso and Giovanni Pierluigi da Palestrina. In 1899 he published a collection of church hymns and related music, Sequenser, antifoner och hymnen, and planned a chorale book. He died in Stockholm.

His compositions are few in number and show the influence of Franz Berwald, who was a personal friend. His Symphony in D minor (1870–72) is commonly cited as one of his best works.

== Selected works ==
- Piano Trio in E-flat major (1850)
- Overture in D minor (c. 1850)
- Cello Duo (1851)
- Three Waltzes for orchestra (1851)
- Overture in D major (mid-1850s)
- String Quartet No. 1 Quartetto svedese in C minor (1856, rev. 1895)
- String Quartet No. 2 in D major (mid-1860s; published posthumously in 1937)
- Symphony in D minor (1870–72, rev. 1895)
- Fantasia över två finska visor (1872)
- Operetta Herman Vimpel (1873)
- Andantino for orchestra, in D minor (1876)
- Opera Cervantes (unfinished)
