= Ole Olsen (filmmaker) =

Danish film producer

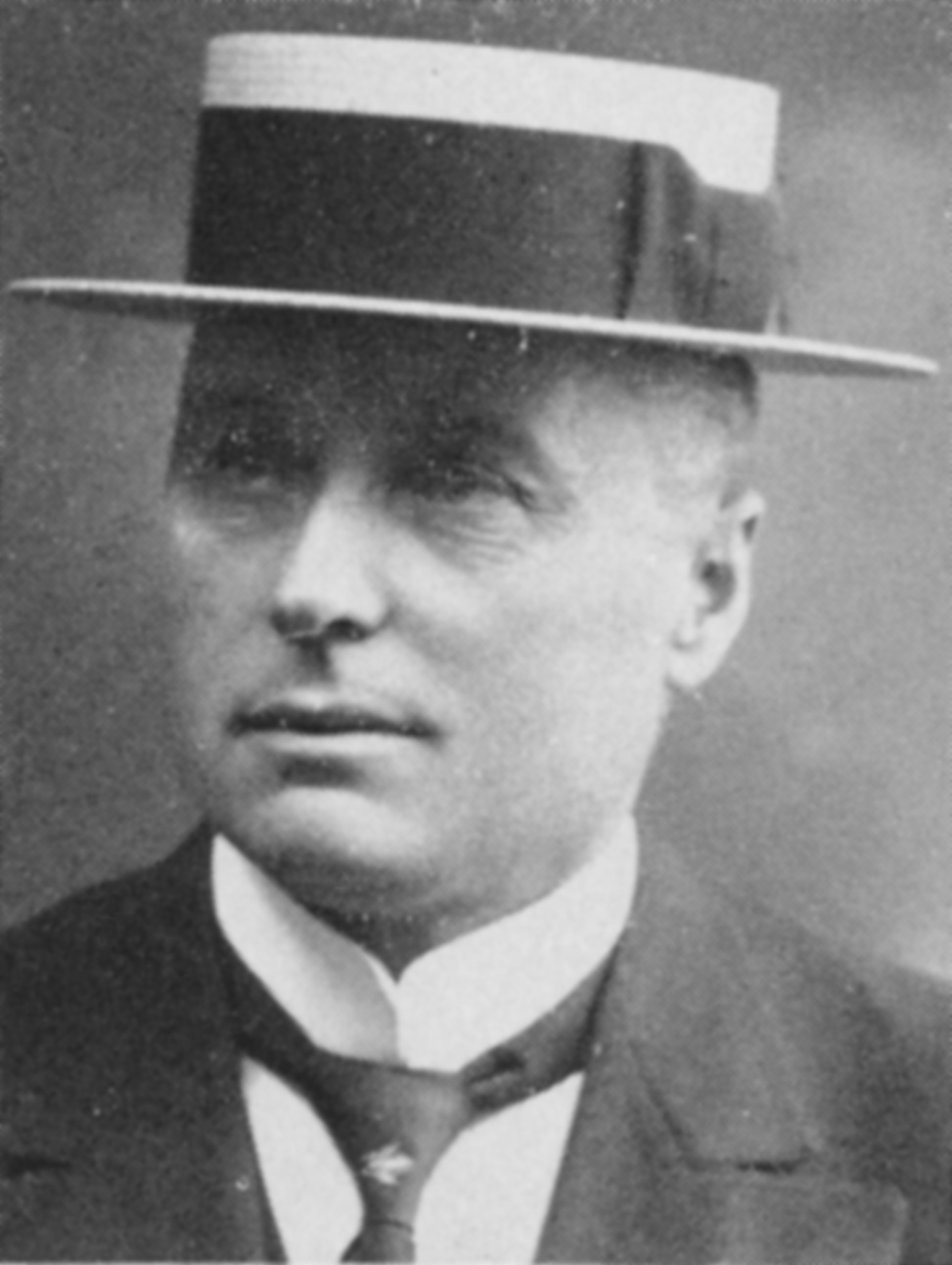
- Born: 5 May 1863; Tangemose, Starreklinte, Denmark
- Died: 5 October 1943 (aged 80); Copenhagen, Denmark
- Occupations: Film director Film producer Founder of Nordisk Film Kompagni
- Years active: 1899–1924
- Spouse: Anna Johanne Ludovica Hendriksen

Ole Olsen (5 May 1863 – 5 October 1943) was a Danish film producer and the 1906 founder of Nordisk Film.

Olsen was born in Starreklinte, Vallekilde Parish on the Odsherred peninsula of northwestern Zealand; he died in Hellerup, outside Copenhagen.
