= Oscar Byström (actor) =

Swedish actor

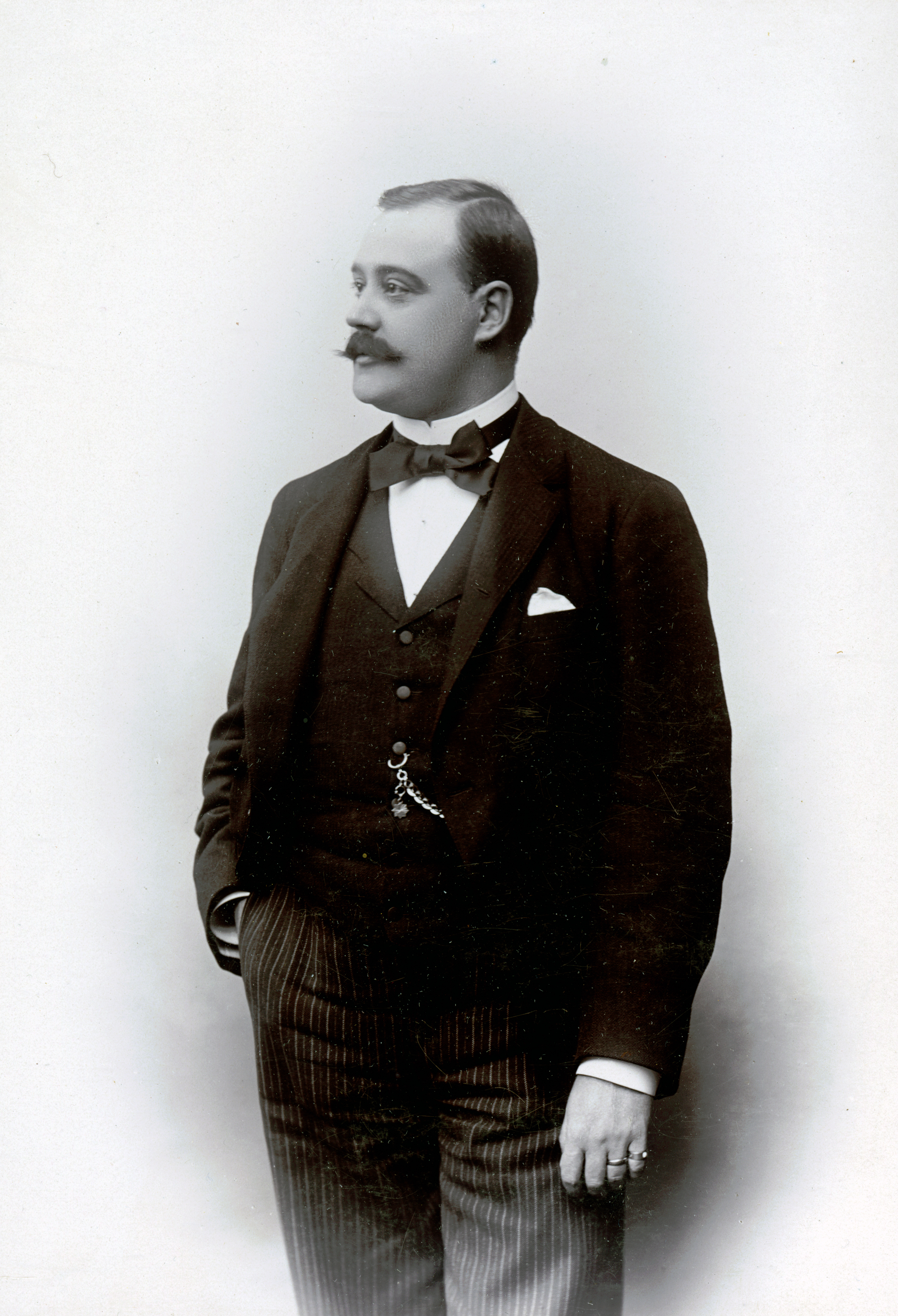
Oscar Byström

Oscar Byström (31 December 1857 – 4 June 1938) was a Swedish actor.

Byström debuted in 1884 at the Royal Dramatic Theatre. During 1885–1886, when he was involved in the theater company of Oscar Sternvall-Skottes . Byström was employed at the Royal Dramatic Theatre from 1890 to 1893. From 1907, he was as deputy director at the Vasateatern. His career in film started with a small role in Gösta Berlings saga (1924). He was married in 1896 to actress Constance Ericsson-Behrens (1868–1952).

== Filmography ==
- Gösta Berlings saga (1924)
- A Perfect Gentleman (1927)
- The Ghost Baron (1927)
- Jansson's Temptation (1928)
- Flickan från Värmland (1931)
- Markurells i Wadköping (1931)
- Modern Wives (1932)
- Dear Relatives (1933)
- Unfriendly Relations (1936)
