= Realm of Man =

1949 film

- Directed by: Gösta Folke
- Written by: Karl Fredrik Björn; Rune Lindström
- Based on: Real of Man by Sven Edvin Salje
- Starring: Ulf Palme; Anita Björk; Erik Hell
- Cinematography: Göran Strindberg
- Edited by: Lennart Wallén
- Music by: Erland von Koch
- Production company: Nordisk Tonefilm
- Distributed by: Nordisk Tonefilm
- Release date: 19 September 1949
- Running time: 98 minutes
- Country: Sweden
- Language: Swedish

Realm of Man (Swedish: Människors rike) is a 1949 Swedish drama film directed by Gösta Folke and starring Ulf Palme, Anita Björk and Erik Hell. It is based on a novel of the same name by Sven Edvin Salje. The film's sets were designed by the art director Bibi Lindström. Location shooting took place around Jämshög.

== Cast ==
- Ulf Palme as Kjell Arvid Loväng
- Anita Björk as Birgit Maria Larsson
- Erik Hell as Aron Loväng
- Ragnvi Lindbladh as Sonja Eriksson
- Märta Arbin as Inga Loväng
- Oscar Ljung as Andreasson
- Agneta Prytz as Edla
- Jan-Erik Lindqvist as Janne
- Artur Cederborgh as Måns-Erik Eriksson
- Ivar Kåge as Osbor, doctor
- Torsten Winge as Beck-Lasse
- Erik Strandell as Georg Larsson
- Artur Rolén as Stall-Jonte
- Sven Magnusson as Aron's fellow worker
- Nils Hultgren as Miller
- Harry Ahlin as Auctioneer
- Karl Olof Hallin as Vicar
- Bertil Berglund as Torvidsson
- Adèle Lundvall as Margit
- Hugo Tranberg as Birgit's father
- Millan Bolander as Birgit's mother
- Gösta Ericsson as Engineer
- Hanny Schedin as Sonja's mother
- John W. Björling as Wedding guest
- Ernst Brunman as Man at auction
- Bengt Brunskog as Card player
- Gösta Folke as Driver
- Arne Källerud as Drunk man at the auction
- Uno Larsson as Wedding guest
- Walter Sarmell as Card player
- John Zacharias as Veterinary

== Reception ==
"...the film adheres fairly well to the style of a decent folk story. It may not sound very funny, but it is honest and upright -- as the saying goes. There is a serious dramatic conflict in the brotherly dispute that Sven Edvin Salje colorfully depicts, a conflict with deep roots in literature. He has modernized it, even if the actualization does not extend further than the time before the Sköld Land Acquisition Act.", wrote a review in the Dagens Nyheter.

A review in Aftonbladet stated:"Folke is uneven and his film is uneven. Between the top sections there are longings here that are unforgivable. Sometimes you sit impatiently and mumble to yourself: Well, isn't the line coming soon?"

"A year ago, the first adaptation of a book by Salje was released in a film version, På dessa sküldror, as a sympathetic departure from the mediocrity that has long been tolerated in the depiction of the common people on film, free from both snuff-gub comedy and outdated folk song romanticism. (-) This new film has the same convincing everyday tone, the same credible plot, the same authenticity in the setting -- but it does not flow by far as easily, as smoothly and rhythmically as its predecessor. There are longings here, irrelevant details that are not incorporated into the plot and too unmediated transitions. For those who have not seen the first part -- and avoid making unfavorable comparisons -- the development of the plot probably offers some ambiguities", found the Svenska Dagbladet.

== Bibliography ==
- Qvist, Per Olov & von Bagh, Peter. Guide to the Cinema of Sweden and Finland. Greenwood Publishing Group, 2000.
