= Kjellson =

Kjellson is a surname. Notable people with the surname include:

- Grutle Kjellson (born 1973), Norwegian musician
- Ingvar Kjellson (1923–2014), Swedish actor
