= In the Arms of the Sea =

1951 film

- Directed by: Arne Mattsson
- Written by: Ivar Ahlstedt
- Produced by: Lennart Landheim; Gunnar Lundin
- Starring: Alf Kjellin; Ulf Palme; Edvin Adolphson; Eva Dahlbeck
- Cinematography: Göran Strindberg
- Edited by: Lennart Wallén
- Music by: José Padilla; Erland von Koch
- Production company: Nordisk Tonefilm
- Distributed by: Nordisk Tonefilm
- Release date: 17 September 1951
- Running time: 108 minutes
- Country: Sweden
- Language: Swedish

In the Arms of the Sea (Swedish: Bärande hav) is a 1951 Swedish drama film directed by Arne Mattsson and starring Alf Kjellin, Ulf Palme, Edvin Adolphson and Eva Dahlbeck. It was shot at the Centrumateljéerna Studios in Stockholm and on location in Gothenburg, Hamburg and Santos in Brazil. The film's sets were designed by the art director P.A. Lundgren.

== Cast ==
- Alf Kjellin as Martin Winner
- Ulf Palme as Bo Winner
- Edvin Adolphson as Henry Lilja
- Bengt Eklund as Palm
- Erik Strandmark as Holger Rehnberg
- Eva Dahlbeck as Lucie
- Ulla Holmberg as Nurse Rangvi
- Märta Arbin as Captain's Wife
- Anne-Margrethe Björlin as Sonja Jacobsson
- Bengt Blomgren as 'Stora Björn'
- Bernt Callenbo as Gustav Engård
- Gösta Cederlund as Captain
- Erich Conrad as Bertil Karlsson
- Doreen Denning as Käthi
- Berta Hall as Tovas' Mother
- Nils Hallberg as Nisse Melander
- Ingemar Holde as Moroten Pettersson
- Ulla Jacobsson as Nisse's Fiancée
- Ruth Kasdan as Rehnberg's Wife
- Magnus Kesster as Chief
- Ingvar Kjellson as Third Mate
- Willy Koblanck as Waiter
- Georg Løkkeberg as Sönderby
- Sten Mattsson as Tovas
- Robert Peiper as Blind Passport Forger
- Hjördis Petterson as Mrs. Lilja
- Lasse Sarri as Mess Boy
- Henake Schubak as Onni
- Georg Skarstedt as Cook
- Jan-Olof Strandberg as Sven-Erik Nilsson
- Harry Ahlin as Constable
- Tor Borong as Captain
- Gita Gordeladze as Carmencita
- Sten Hedlund as Steward
- Håkan Jahnberg as Dr. Larsson
- Stig Johanson as Sailor
- Olav Riégo as Doctor
- Emy Storm as Girl at the Sailor's Pub
- Gull Strindberg as Boatman's daughter
- Charles White as Black sailor
- Peter Winner as German policeman

== Bibliography ==
- Qvist, Per Olov & von Bagh, Peter. Guide to the Cinema of Sweden and Finland. Greenwood Publishing Group, 2000.
