= Miss Julie (1951 film) =

1951 film by Alf Sjöberg

- Theatrical release poster
- Swedish: Fröken Julie
- Directed by: Alf Sjöberg
- Screenplay by: Alf Sjöberg
- Based on: Miss Julie by August Strindberg
- Produced by: Rune Waldekranz
- Starring: Anita Björk; Ulf Palme
- Cinematography: Göran Strindberg
- Edited by: Lennart Wallén
- Music by: Dag Wirén
- Production company: AB Sandrew-Produktion
- Release dates: 6 April 1951 (Cannes Film Festival); 30 July 1951
- Running time: 89 minutes
- Country: Sweden
- Language: Swedish

Miss Julie (Swedish: Fröken Julie) is a 1951 Swedish drama film directed by Alf Sjöberg and starring Anita Björk and Ulf Palme, based on the 1888 play by August Strindberg. The film deals with class, sex and power as the title character, the daughter of a Count in 19th century Sweden, begins a relationship with one of the estate's servants. The film won the Grand Prix du Festival International du Film at the 1951 Cannes Film Festival.

== Plot ==
Following a scandalous broken engagement, Miss Julie, the daughter of Count Carl, forgoes a family Midsummer's Eve celebration to "honour" the estate servants' ball with her presence. There, she dances with one of the servants, Jean, whom she is attracted to. She orders him to sit at the table with her for beers and humiliatingly forces him to kiss her shoe. Outside, she makes advances on him; the hand, hiding behind a sculpture, witnesses the encounter in shock. Miss Julie asks Jean if he has ever been in love. He replies that he loved her as a boy when he lived in poverty and saw her on the estate, but he was chased off as an "urchin." The servants march forward, singing and looking for Jean; Julie and Jean realize the scandal that will erupt if they are seen together and attempt to escape and hide, but the hand has already told of what he saw.

Jean and Julie contemplate escape; Jean, condemning the tradition and class bias of Sweden, wishes to take a train to Italy, where he can run a hotel with investment capital from Julie. Julie replies that she has no money of her own and is shocked by his sudden demeanor of callousness towards her. He is unconcerned about her fears of the Count learning of the scandal and reveals he is not willing to die for her, as he suggested. Just as he had told her about his boyhood, Julie recounts her girlhood: Her mother Berta was a commoner who believed in women's rights and had to be persuaded to marry. She married Count Carl, and they had Julie, who was dressed in boy's clothes, but Julie preferred playing with dolls. The Countess set fire to their home. The Count later attempted suicide by firearm. Upon hearing the story, Jean declares himself of superior heritage, as Julie is the daughter of an arsonist.

Before leaving on Midsummer's Day, Jean sees Julie's finch Serine and declares they cannot take a birdcage. When Julie says she would rather Serine die than be left behind, Jean breaks its neck; Julie curses him and the day she was born. When the Count returns, he finds Julie has killed herself by razor, under the portrait of the Countess.

== Cast ==
- Anita Björk as Miss Julie
- Ulf Palme as Jean
- Märta Dorff as Kristin, cook
- Lissi Alandh as Countess Berta, Julie's mother
- Anders Henrikson as Count Carl, Julie's father
- Inga Gill as Viola
- Åke Fridell as Robert
- Kurt-Olof Sundström as Julie's fiancé
- Max von Sydow as hand
- Margaretha Krook as governess
- Åke Claesson as doctor
- Signe Lundberg-Settergren as maid
- Inger Norberg as Julie as a child
- Jan Hagerman as Jean as a child

== Production ==
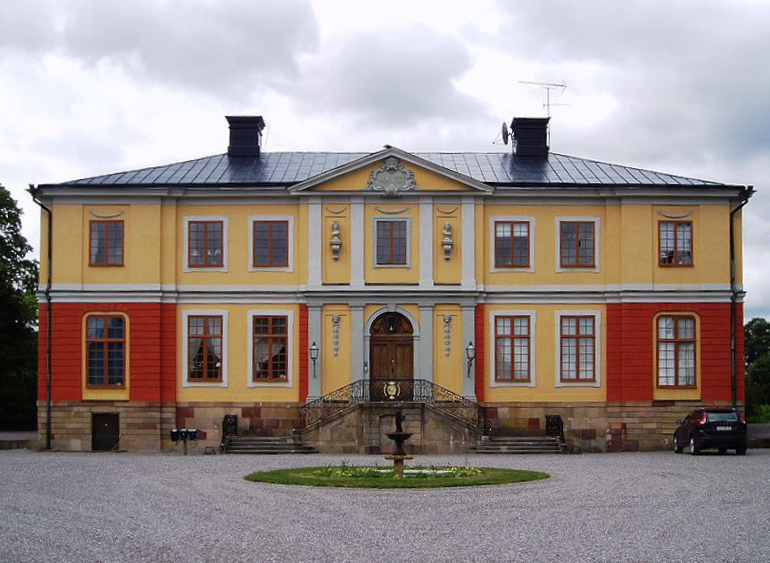
Stora Wäsby Castle was a filming location.

Sjöberg had directed a stage adaptation of August Strindberg's Miss Julie in 1949, starring Ulf Palme as Jean and Inga Tidblad in the title role. For the film adaptation, not only Palme was kept but also many of the set designs. Tidblad however, at the age of almost 50, was replaced by the 27-year-old Anita Björk. Tidblad's interpretation was held as an ideal by the director and only during the exterior sequences, which had not been part of the stage version, did Björk feel that the part actually belonged to her.

Filming took place between 28 April and 18 July 1950 in Sandrew's studios and various locations in the Stockholm area, including Dalarö, Stora Wäsby Castle, and the Drottningholm Palace Park.

In the book-length interview Hitchcock/Truffaut (Simon and Schuster, 1967), Alfred Hitchcock said he had hired Björk as the female lead for I Confess in 1952, after seeing her in Miss Julie. However, when Björk arrived in Hollywood with her lover Stig Dagerman and their baby, Jack L. Warner, head of Warner Brothers, insisted that Hitchcock find another actress.

== Reception ==
Alf Sjöberg won the highest honour of the Cannes Film Festival, the Grand Prix du Festival International du Film, the equivalent of the Palme d'Or in later years. Sjöberg, who won earlier for Torment, was the first Swedish director to win the award, and the only one until 2017, when Ruben Östlund won for The Square. Miss Julie was also nominated for the BAFTA Award for Best Film in 1952.

Film critic, Pauline Kael wrote of the film that "the film treats the play as if stage and screen were opposed media and the play had to be subjected to a chemical change."

In 1987, The New York Times critic Walter Goodman criticized the film, writing "Bjork seems bewildered by the constant shifts of emotional response required of her". The Guardian's Philip French recalled Bjork in 2000 as "an unforgettable Julie". In 2008, Entertainment Weekly's Tim Purtell called it "startling" and cited Bjork for a "feverish performance". Reviewing The Criterion Collection DVD, Stuart Henderson cited for "exciting liberties" taken with the classic play, creating a "deeply compelling" film. In his 2015 Movie Guide, Leonard Maltin gave it three stars, commending it as "Superbly acted and photographed".
