= Rätten att älska =

1956 film

- Directed by: Mimi Pollak
- Starring: Stig Järrel
- Release date: 27 February 1956
- Running time: 79 minutes
- Country: Sweden
- Language: Swedish

Rätten att älska is a 1956 Swedish drama film directed by Mimi Pollak.

== Cast ==
- Stig Järrel as Bernhard Borg
- Märta Dorff as Margareta Borg
- Pia Skoglund as Berit Borg
- Ingemar Pallin as Lennart Borg
- Sten Gester as Arne Lindgren
- Carin Cederlund as Lilly Sund
- Catrin Westerlund as Ulla Winge
- Anna-Lisa Baude as Maria Larsson
- Sven-Eric Gamble as Julle Larsson
- Meg Westergren as Julle's Fiancée
- Max von Sydow as Bergman
- Börje Mellvig as Wallin
- Hans Strååt as Söderberg
