= Love 65 =

1965 film by Bo Widerberg

- Directed by: Bo Widerberg
- Written by: Bo Widerberg
- Starring: Keve Hjelm; Ann-Marie Gyllenspetz; Evabritt Strandberg; Inger Taube; Ben Carruthers; Björn Gustafson; Kent Andersson
- Cinematography: Hans Emanuelsson; Jan Lindeström; Bruno Rådström
- Edited by: Bo Widerberg
- Distributed by: Europa Film
- Release date: 17 March 1965
- Running time: 96 minutes
- Country: Sweden
- Language: Swedish

Love 65 (Swedish: Kärlek 65) is a 1965 Swedish drama film written and directed by Bo Widerberg. It was entered into the 15th Berlin International Film Festival where it received an honorable mention for the FIPRESCI Prize. Bill Evans' "Peace Piece" featured in the soundtrack. The characters in the film go by the real first names of the actors.

== Plot ==
Keve is a successful film director who lives with his beautiful wife, Ann-Marie, and their daughter, Nina, in the Kåseberga area in Skåne. Despite this, Keve finds himself unsatisfied. As he prepares to shoot a new film, he channels his frustrations into an affair with a married woman.

== Cast ==
- Keve Hjelm as Keve
- Ben Carruthers as Benito (as Benito Carruthers)
- Ann-Marie Gyllenspetz as Ann-Marie
- Evabritt Strandberg as Evabritt
- Inger Taube as Inger
- Björn Gustafson as Björn
- Kent Andersson as Kent
- Thommy Berggren as Actor
- Agneta Ekmanner as Actress

== Release ==
The film was released in Sweden on 17 March 1965. In June of the same year it was presented in competition at the Berlin Film Festival.

In 2002 it was screened again at Berlinale as part of the retrospective section "European 60s - Revolt, Fantasy & Utopia", which is dedicated to European cinema and the cultural and political upheavals of the 1960s.

== Critical reception ==
The film received a mixed response, with critics lauding the beauty of its shots but criticizing the directionless narrative. In 1972, The Guardian's Derek Malcolm wrote: "Love 65 now seems to stand uncomfortably between the raw realism of 'Raven's End' and the evocative lyricism of 'Elvira Madigan'".
