= Bang! (film) =

1977 film

- Directed by: Jan Troell
- Written by: Georg Oddner; Sven Christer Swahn; Jan Troell
- Produced by: Bengt Forslund
- Starring: Susan Hampshire
- Cinematography: Jan Troell
- Edited by: Jan Troell
- Release date: 6 June 1977
- Running time: 100 minutes
- Country: Sweden
- Language: Swedish

Bang! is a 1977 Swedish drama film directed by Jan Troell. It was entered into the 1977 Cannes Film Festival. Håkan Serner won the award for Best Actor at the 13th Guldbagge Awards.

== Cast ==
- Susan Hampshire - Cilla Brown
- Alf Hellberg - Older Colleague
- Kristina Kamnert-Suneson - Cleaning woman
- Kristina Karlin - Cleaning Woman
- Staffan Liljander - Colleague
- Yvonne Lombard - Lena
- Berto Marklund - School Janitor
- Ulf Palme - Johnny
- Agneta Prytz - Mrs. Leonardsson
- Håkan Serner - Hinder
- Beate Ùrskov - Beate
- Eva von Hanno - Rosita
- Åke Whilney - Hinder's Classmate
- Claire Wikholm - Colleague
