= Four Times Love =

1951 Swedish film by Hampe Faustman

- Finnish bilingual poster.
- Directed by: Hampe Faustman
- Written by: Hampe Faustman; Olle Hellbom; Arvid Müller; Volodja Semitjov
- Produced by: T. J. Särkkä
- Starring: Sonja Wigert
- Cinematography: Hilmer Ekdahl; Kalle Peronkoski
- Edited by: Armas Vallasvuo
- Music by: Erland von Koch
- Release date: 12 October 1951
- Running time: 100 minutes
- Countries: Sweden; Finland; Denmark; Norway
- Languages: Swedish; Finnish; Danish; Norwegian

Four Times Love (Swedish: Kvinnan bakom allt [in Sweden]; Swedish: Fyra gånger kärlek [in Finland]; Finnish: Neljä rakkautta; Danish: Alt dette og Island med; Norwegian: Alt dette – og Island også) is a 1951 co-Nordic film directed by Hampe Faustman and Johan Jacobsen and starring Sonja Wigert.

== Cast ==
- Sonja Wigert as Nina Lind
- Georg Funkquist as Mayor
- Bengt Logardt as First Aide
- Börje Mellvig as Second Aide
- Gyrd Løfquist as Third Aide
- Sture Lagerwall as Gustaf Dalander
- William Markus as Toivo Nurminen
- Poul Reichhardt as Axel Poulsen
- Georg Richter as Finn Borg
- Bengt Blomgren as Sigurd Thorarinsen
