= Candidate for Murder =

1962 British film by David Villiers

- Michael Gough and Erika Remberg
- Directed by: David Villiers
- Screenplay by: Lukas Heller
- Story by: Edgar Wallace
- Produced by: Jack Greenwood
- Starring: Michael Gough; Erika Remberg; Hans von Borsody; John Justin
- Cinematography: Bert Mason
- Music by: Charles Blackwell
- Production company: Merton Park Studios
- Distributed by: Anglo-Amalgamated
- Release date: 2 April 1962
- Running time: 60 minutes
- Country: United Kingdom
- Language: English

Candidate for Murder is a 1962 British second feature film directed by David Villiers and starring Michael Gough, Erika Remberg, Hans von Borsody and John Justin. Part of the long-running series of Edgar Wallace Mysteries films made at Merton Park Studios, it is based on a story by Edgar Wallace.

== Plot ==
Donald Edwards suspects his wife Helene of infidelity with barrister Robert Vaughan. He hires Kersten, a German assassin, to kill her, and delivers him from the airport to a country cottage. In the evening Kersten shows up uninvited at a party hosted by Helene, and arouses the suspicions of Helene and Vaughan. After the guests leave, Kersten surprises Helene, and points his gun at her. When Vaughan returns to Helene and Edwards' house he finds Helene gone, but Edwards there, who is acting suspiciously.

The next day Edwards drives to the country to meet Kersten, who demands his payment. Edwards refuses until he has proof that his wife is dead. Kersten tells him he will return in three hours with the body. Meanwhile, Vaughn has tailed Edwards, and then follows Kersten back to the cottage, where Kersten coshes him and throws him into the cellar, where there appears to be a woman's body.

Kersten and Edwards meet again and Kersten shows him a fake body, explaining that he suspected that Edwards had planned to kill him as the only witness to his wife's murder. He takes the money from Edwards, and tells him that his wife is safe in the cottage's cellar. Edwards shoots Kersten, and drives to the cottage, where he finds Vaughan and Helene, who have escaped from the cellar. Kersten appears, badly injured, and shoots Edwards just as he is about to shoot Vaughan. Kersten falls dead.

== Cast ==
- Michael Gough as Donald Edwards
- Erika Remberg as Helene Edwards
- Hans von Borsody as Kersten
- John Justin as Robert Vaughan
- Paul Whitsun-Jones as Phillips
- Vanda Godsell as Betty Conlon
- Jerold Wells as police inspector
- Annika Wills as Jacqueline
- Victor Charrington as barman
- Ray Smith as chauffeur
- Norma Parnell as guest at party
- Odette Nash as guest at party
- Gabriella Licudi as guest at party
- Pamela Greer as guest at party
- Richard Bidlake as guest at party
- Mike Hall as guest at party
- Robin Phillips as guest at party

== Critical reception ==
The Monthly Film Bulletin wrote: "One of the better Edgar Wallace thrillers, with a sustained and well-paced, if unoriginal, narrative and smooth technical credits."
