= Laila (1958 film) =

1958 film

- Directed by: Rolf Husberg
- Written by: Rolf Husberg; Adolf Schütz
- Based on: Fra Finnmarken Skildringer by Jens Andreas Friis
- Starring: Erika Remberg; Edvin Adolphson; Isa Quensel
- Cinematography: Sven Nykvist
- Edited by: Lennart Wallén
- Music by: Lars-Erik Larsson
- Production companies: Rhombus Film; Sandrews
- Distributed by: Sandrews; UFA
- Release date: 13 November 1958
- Running time: 100 minutes
- Countries: Sweden; West Germany
- Language: Swedish

Laila is a 1958 Swedish-West German drama film directed by Rolf Husberg and starring Erika Remberg, Edvin Adolphson and Isa Quensel. It was shot at the Centrumateljéerna Studios in Stockholm. The film's sets and costumes were designed by the art director Harald Garmland.

== Cast ==
- Erika Remberg as Laila Logje
- Edvin Adolphson as Aslak Logje
- Isa Quensel as Elli Logje
- Birger Malmsten as Mellet Omma
- Joachim Hansen as Anders Lind
- Ann-Marie Gyllenspetz as Inger Lind
- Alfred Maurstad as Jompa
- Annalisa Wenström as Kari
- Rune Ottoson as Kari's Husband
- Birger Lensander as Kari's Father
- Sif Ruud as Mrs. Johansson
- Bengt Blomgren as Nielsen
- Anne Blomberg as Mrs. Nielsen
- Bengt Eklund as Björneberg
- Wiktor Andersson as Mortensson
- Christian Bratt as Preacher
- Bernt Callenbo as Young Drunk Man
- Ragnar Falck as Constable
- Helge Hagerman as Parish Constable
- Ninni Löfberg as Nurse Gerda
- Sune Mangs as Speaker at the reindeer race
- Sten Mattsson as Hatti
- Thore Segelström as Hotti
- Willie Sjöberg as Pieti
- Sonja Westerbergh as Rasmussen, teacher
- Inga-Lill Åhström as Hilda
- Georg Årlin as Parish constable
- Ivar Wahlgren as Priest

== Bibliography ==
- Goble, Alan. The Complete Index to Literary Sources in Film. Walter de Gruyter, 1999.
- Wright, Rochelle. The Visible Wall: Jews and Other Ethnic Outsiders in Swedish Film. SIU Press, 1998.
