= Girl with Hyacinths =

1950 film

- Theatrical release poster
- Directed by: Hasse Ekman
- Written by: Hasse Ekman
- Produced by: Lorens Marmstedt
- Starring: Eva Henning; Ulf Palme; Anders Ek; Birgit Tengroth
- Cinematography: Göran Strindberg
- Edited by: Lennart Wallén
- Music by: Erland von Koch
- Production company: Terrafilm
- Distributed by: Terrafilm
- Release date: 6 March 1950
- Running time: 89 minutes
- Country: Sweden
- Language: Swedish

Girl with Hyacinths (Swedish: Flicka och hyacinter) is a 1950 Swedish drama film written and directed by Hasse Ekman, starring Eva Henning, Ulf Palme, Anders Ek and Birgit Tengroth. It follows a man who investigates the mysterious life of his neighbour who has died by suicide.

== Plot ==
A young woman is playing the piano at a wild party. When asked to play a special tune, she begins but stops abruptly and rushes out, visibly upset. Alone she starts to walk home through late night central Stockholm. Crossing a bridge, she has a conversation with a drunk artist, and after his persuasion, out of kindness, she gives him money for the sketch, but does not take it. Arriving at her apartment, she straps a rope to the ceiling and hangs herself. The next morning her body is found by a housekeeper.

The police arrives and ask questions to her neighbours. The young woman's name was Dagmar Brink, and she was something of a loner. Nobody knew much about her, although she had lived for a while in the building, but everyone states that she seemed like a sweet and nice girl.

Her closest neighbours in the flat next door, writer Anders Wikner and his wife Britt, are both shocked by the girl's suicide. Soon Anders starts to investigate what happened. He contacts the few people who knew her and asks them questions. He meets artist Elias Körner who painted a portrait of her, an old bank manager who had a cold meeting with her, a woman who shared a room with her once, an ex-husband, and the singer whose party she attended the night of the suicide.

Anders' wife also turns out to have a story about Dagmar and what happened one night in Dagmar's apartment. The different people's meetings with Dagmar are told in several flashbacks.

== Cast ==
- Eva Henning as Dagmar Brink
- Ulf Palme as Anders Wikner
- Birgit Tengroth as Britt Wikner
- Anders Ek as Elias Körner
- Marianne Löfgren as Gullan Wiklund
- Gösta Cederlund as banker
- Karl-Arne Holmsten as Willy Borge
- Keve Hjelm as Captain Brink
- Anne-Marie Brunius as Alex

== Production ==
Principal photography took place from 20 October to 3 December 1949 in Sandrew's studios with exterior scenes in Stockholm.

== Reception ==
British film historian Peter Cowie wrote that Ekman "drives home the extended depression of winter, and the rain falling remorselessly, and the heavy shadows of darkness filling the streets. Within, ceilings weigh on the heads of characters while they are often viewed from a sharp inferior angle. Deep-focus sets them, traps them, in their miserable surroundings. This fluent visual manner reinforces the nostalgia of the postwar period."

British film critic F. Maurice Speed observed that Ekman "was remarkably successful in re-creating the miserable life of a girl alone in Stockholm, here the angst of the 40s in Sweden — the unacknowledged guilt at standing aloof from the war, the painful birth of a new social order — was given its fullest expression, with Anders Ek contributing a memorably bitter portrait of a drunken painter." Critic Philip Kemp, said Ekman tells "a haunting story about an investigation into a girl’s suicide. The film showed the unusual sexual frankness of postwar Swedish cinema, while subtly probing the compromises made by Sweden to remain neutral during World War II."

Variety Magazine opined "handled in a ponderous fashion that depends upon sullen settings and a morose air to provide the psychological basis for the desperate action, it's long in breadth and short in depth. The dedication to the manifestation of surface tension and reluctance to offer more than a few fragments that go beyond exterior realities has given the film a lopsided quality. Ultimately when the parts of the suicide puzzle are fitted together the conclusion seems rather hollow and contrived."

== See also ==
- Cinema of Sweden
- List of Swedish films of the 1950s
- List of LGBTQ-related films of the 1950s
