= Neglected by His Wife =

1947 film

- Directed by: Gösta Folke
- Written by: Sven Björkman
- Starring: Irma Christenson; Karl-Arne Holmsten; Agneta Prytz
- Cinematography: Hilding Bladh; Göran Strindberg
- Edited by: Lennart Wallén
- Music by: Håkan von Eichwald
- Production company: Sandrews
- Distributed by: Sandrew-Baumanfilm
- Release date: 20 October 1947
- Running time: 88 minutes
- Country: Sweden
- Language: Swedish

Neglected by His Wife (Swedish: Försummad av sin fru or Gift med Klara Klok) is a 1947 Swedish comedy film directed by Gösta Folke and starring Irma Christenson, Karl-Arne Holmsten and Agneta Prytz. It was shot at the Centrumateljéerna Studios in Stockholm. The film's sets were designed by the art director Bibi Lindström.

== Synopsis ==
Two newlywed journalists barely have time to see each other due to their work, leading to the husband feeling neglected by his wife. He cooks dinner for her three evenings in a row, only for her to not turn up. He then writes asking for advice to the lonely hearts column she writes for the newspaper.

== Cast ==
- Irma Christenson as Siska Hedberg
- Karl-Arne Holmsten as Pelle Hedberg
- Agneta Prytz as Tove Larsson
- Lars Kåge as Torsten Söderlund
- Carl Hagman as Löfgren
- Åke Claesson as Chief Editor
- Harry Ahlin as Olsson
- Barbro Flodquist as Journalist
- Georg Skarstedt as Linde
- Torsten Bergström as Westlund
- Arne Lindblad as Night Editor
- Margit Andelius as Lady at Library
- Julie Bernby as Lisbeth
- Artur Cederborgh as Porter
- Erland Colliander as Hansson
- Signe Lundberg-Settergren as Cashier
- Ludde Juberg as Hot Dog Salesman
- Birger Lensander as Worker
- Gunnar Öhlund as Maître d'
- Ingrid Luterkort as Journalist
- Segol Mann as Journalist
- David Erikson as Man Seeking Advice
- John Norrman as Man with Sandwich Board
- Sif Ruud as Wife
- Hugo Tranberg as Janitor at Library
- Gunnel Wadner as Waitress

== Bibliography ==
- Krawc, Alfred. International Directory of Cinematographers, Set- and Costume Designers in Film: Denmark, Finland, Norway, Sweden (from the beginnings to 1984). Saur, 1986.
