= The Minister of Uddarbo =

1957 film

- Directed by: Kenne Fant
- Written by: Axel Hambræus (novel); Rune Lindström; Kenne Fant
- Produced by: Lennart Landheim; Gunnar Lundin
- Starring: Max von Sydow; Ann-Marie Gyllenspetz; Anders Henrikson
- Cinematography: Max Wilén
- Edited by: Carl-Olov Skeppstedt
- Music by: Ingvar Wieslander; Sven Sköld
- Production company: Nordisk Tonefilm
- Distributed by: Nordisk Tonefilm
- Release date: 26 December 1957
- Running time: 92 minutes
- Country: Sweden
- Language: Swedish

The Minister of Uddarbo (Swedish: Prästen i Uddarbo) is a 1957 Swedish drama film directed by Kenne Fant and starring Max von Sydow, Ann-Marie Gyllenspetz and Anders Henrikson. It was shot at the Kungsholmen Studios of Nordisk Tonefilm in Stockholm. The film's sets were designed by the art director Bibi Lindström.

== Cast ==
- Max von Sydow as Gustaf Ömark
- Ann-Marie Gyllenspetz as Hanna
- Anders Henrikson as Teodor
- Holger Löwenadler as Alsing
- Erik Strandmark as Ris Erik Eriksson
- Georg Rydeberg as Naaman
- Olof Thunberg as Per Halvarsson
- Tord Stål as Bishop of Västerås
- Björn Berglund as Chairman
- Maud Elfsiö as Inger
- John Norrman as Johannes
- Gudrun Brost as Albertina, aka Gäs-Fröken
- Elsa Ebbesen as Amalia Larsson, teacher
- Georg Adelly as Shop Assistant
- Svenerik Perzon as Rutger
- Artur Cederborgh as Farmer
- Claes Thelander as Doctor in Uppsala
- Yngve Nordwall as Teacher
- Ingmar Lind as Göte
- Bengt Sundmark as Worker in Uppsala
- Aurore Palmgren as Old vicar's wife
- Ingvar Kjellson as Doctor
- Gunnar Öhlund as Lumberjack
- Brita Öberg as Woman at Christening

== Bibliography ==
- Qvist, Per Olov & von Bagh, Peter. Guide to the Cinema of Sweden and Finland. Greenwood Publishing Group, 2000.
