= 3rd Guldbagge Awards =

Annual Swedish film awards ceremony

- Date: 17 October 1966
- Site: Spegeln & Operaterrassen, Stockholm, Sweden

Highlights
- Best Picture: Heja Roland!

The 3rd Guldbagge Awards ceremony, presented by the Swedish Film Institute, honored the best Swedish 1965 and 1966, and took place on 17 October 1966. Heja Roland! directed by Bo Widerberg was presented with the award for Best Film.

== Awards ==
- Best Film: Heja Roland! by Bo Widerberg
- Best Director: Alf Sjöberg for Ön
- Best Actor: Thommy Berggren for Heja Roland!
- Best Actress: Christina Schollin for Ormen
- Special Achievement: Bengt Idestam-Almquist
