= Ann-Marie Gyllenspetz =

Swedish actress

- Born: 7 November 1932; Gothenburg, Sweden
- Died: 10 February 1999 (aged 66); Lund, Sweden
- Occupation: Actress
- Years active: 1953–1988

Ann-Marie Gyllenspetz (7 November 1932 – 10 February 1999) was a Swedish actress. She appeared in more than 30 films and television shows between 1953 and 1988. She starred in the 1968 film Who Saw Him Die?, which won the Golden Bear at the 18th Berlin International Film Festival.

In 1965, she co-starred in Love 65 aside Keve Hjelm.

== Selected filmography ==
- No Man's Woman (1953) - Imber Ersson
- Dance in the Smoke (1954) - Woman in haystack (uncredited)
- Simon the Sinner (1954) - Rut Persson
- The Yellow Squadron (1954) - Sonja
- Uncle's (1955) - Viveka Svensson
- The Light from Lund (1955) - Anna
- The Hard Game (1956) - Margit Söderberg
- The Song of the Scarlet Flower (1956) - Annika
- Encounters in the Twilight (1957) - Barbro
- Far till sol och vår (1957) - Vera Boman
- Som man bäddar... (1957) - Elisabeth Kallander
- The Minister of Uddarbo (1957) - Hanna
- Brink of Life (1958) - Counsellor Gran
- We at Väddö (1958) - Ylva Markner
- Laila (1958) - Inger Lind
- A Lion in Town (1959) - Greta Berg
- Love 65 (1965) - Ann-Mari
- Who Saw Him Die? (1968) - Anne-Marie
- Grisjakten (1970) - Margareta Siljeberg
- Hempas bar (1977) - Gunnel
