= Lucky Young Lady =

1941 film by Ragnar Arvedson

- Directed by: Ragnar Arvedson
- Written by: Sigrid Boo (novel); Torsten Flodén
- Starring: Sonja Wigert; Karl-Arne Holmsten; Dagmar Ebbesen
- Cinematography: Harald Berglund
- Edited by: Wic Kjellin
- Music by: Nathan Görling
- Production company: Europa Film
- Distributed by: Europa Film
- Release date: 29 September 1941
- Running time: 86 minutes
- Country: Sweden
- Language: Swedish

Lucky Young Lady (Swedish: Ung dam med tur) is a 1941 Swedish comedy film directed by Ragnar Arvedson and starring Sonja Wigert, Karl-Arne Holmsten and Dagmar Ebbesen. It was shot at the Sundbyberg Studios in Stockholm, and on location in Visby. The film's sets were designed by the art director Max Linder.

== Synopsis ==
Eva, an office worker, discovers that she has unexpectedly inherited a large amount of money in the United States.

== Cast ==
- Sonja Wigert as Eva Bergfelt
- Karl-Arne Holmsten as Hasse Nordgren
- Dagmar Ebbesen as Aunt Gullan
- Åke Ohberg as Fredrik Hall
- Elly Christiansson as Gunvor Hall
- Stina Hedberg as Mrs. Märta Bergfelt
- Hjördis Petterson as Miss Solaeng
- John Botvid as Theobald
- Åke Johansson as Willy
- Torsten Winge as Uncle John
- Anna-Lisa Baude as Nurse
- Hugo Björne as Kernell
- Gösta Bodin as Insurance salesman
- Julia Cæsar as Old lady
- Elsa Ebbesen as Hostess
- Georg Fernqvist as Older Man
- Sigge Fürst as Police constable
- Hilding Gavle as Prof. of Mathematics
- Greta Liming a s Telephone Operator
- Börje Mellvig as Salesman
- Gunnar Olsson as Salesman
- Ruth Weijden as Aunt Ottilia
- Ragnar Widestedt as Doctor
- Carl-Gunnar Wingård as Fingal Syren

== Bibliography ==
- Wallengren, Ann-Kristin. Welcome Home Mr Swanson: Swedish Emigrants and Swedishness on Film. Nordic Academic Press, 2014.
