= The Yellow Squadron =

1954 film

- Directed by: Stig Olin
- Written by: Stig Olin
- Based on: Gyllene vingar by Lars Widding
- Produced by: Alf Jörgensen; Lorens Marmstedt
- Starring: Lars Ekborg; Hasse Ekman; Ann-Marie Gyllenspetz; Sven Lindberg
- Cinematography: Göran Strindberg
- Edited by: Carl-Olov Skeppstedt
- Production company: Terrafilm
- Distributed by: Terrafilm
- Release date: November 29, 1954
- Running time: 86 minutes
- Country: Sweden
- Language: Swedish

The Yellow Squadron (Swedish: Gula divisionen) is a 1954 romantic drama film written and directed by Stig Olin and starring Lars Ekborg, Hasse Ekman and Ann-Marie Gyllenspetz. It was released in the wake of the Korean War, set at the Svea Air Force Wing (F 8) main base located in Barkarby, just north of the Swedish capital Stockholm, and revolves around a fighter squadron of J 29 aircraft.

It was shot at the Centrumateljéerna Studios in Stockholm and on location at the Barkarby Air Force Base. The film's sets were designed by the art director Nils Nilsson.

== Cast ==
- Hasse Ekman as Birger Wreting
- Ann-Marie Gyllenspetz as Sonja
- Sven Lindberg as Lieutenant Hagberg
- Lars Ekborg as Dag Holm
- Gertrud Fridh as Inger Bart-Wreting
- Stig Olin as Boman
- Karl-Arne Holmsten as Field Officer
- John Elfström as Holm
- Kåre Santesson as Arne Bart
- Mona Malm as Berit
- Hans Sackemark as Olsson
- Meg Westergren as Ulla
- Torsten Lilliecrona as Doctor
- Doreen Denning as Actress
- Siv Ericks as Actress
- Mona Geijer-Falkner as A Mother
- Stig Gustavsson as Ström - Wreting's Mechanic
- Ingvar Kjellson as Actor
- Gertie Lindgren as Waitress
- Rune Lindkvist as Actor
- Gösta Prüzelius as Drunk
- Birger Sahlberg as Svensson - Janitor
- Hanny Schedin as A Mother
- Rune Stylander as Drunk
- Bengt Sundmark as Joel Alm - Dag's Mechanic
- Ann-Marie Tistler as Olsson's Sister
- Brita Ulfberg as Waitress

== Bibliography ==
- Qvist, Per Olov & von Bagh, Peter. Guide to the Cinema of Sweden and Finland. Greenwood Publishing Group, 2000.
