= My People Are Not Yours =

1944 film

- Directed by: Weyler Hildebrand
- Written by: Weyler Hildebrand
- Based on: My People Are Not Yours by Carin Fischer-Hugne
- Starring: Sonja Wigert; Gunnar Björnstrand; Hampe Faustman
- Cinematography: Göran Strindberg
- Edited by: Tor Hagman
- Music by: Gunnar Johansson
- Production company: Kungsfilm
- Distributed by: Kungsfilm
- Release date: 19 June 1944
- Running time: 106 minutes
- Country: Sweden
- Language: Swedish

My People Are Not Yours (Swedish: Mitt folk är icke ditt) is a 1944 Swedish drama film directed by Weyler Hildebrand and starring Sonja Wigert, Gunnar Björnstrand and Hampe Faustman. It was shot at the Centrumateljéerna Studios in Stockholm. The film's sets were designed by the art director P.A. Lundgren. It was one of several Swedish films made during the period set in occupied countries similar to German-controlled Denmark and Norway.

== Synopsis ==
Elsie, a pianist returns home after a world tour. At the home of her shipowner father an air raid disturbs them and is followed by an invasion by a foreign country. One of the officers of the occupying army turns out to be Major Rolf von Ritter, with whom she had a romance before the conflict.

== Cast ==
- Sonja Wigert as Else Hill
- Gunnar Björnstrand as Major Rolf von Ritter
- Hampe Faustman as Max Holm
- Håkan Westergren as Skådespelare Georg Lycke
- Björn Berglund as Doktor Herbert Ran
- Mona Mårtenson as Mary Ran
- Sven Bergvall as Skeppsredare John Hill
- Anna-Lisa Baude as Tant Sara
- Douglas Håge as Polismästare Wulff
- Nils Hallberg as Ernst Holm
- Olle Hilding as Caretaker
- Åke Engfeldt as Ernst's Friend
- Nils Nordståhl as Henri
- Fylgia Zadig as Anna - Maid
- Aurore Palmgren as Maria - Maid
- Sven d'Ailly as Captain Miller
- Linnéa Hillberg as Lady at Restaurant
- Erland Colliander as Old Jew
- Claes Thelander as Occupant
- Olav Riégo as Doctor
- Artur Cederborgh as Volunteer
- Anders Frithiof as Volunteer
- Sigge Fürst as Party Leader
- Solveig Lagström as Nurse
- Gunnar Nielsen as Journalist
- Gabriel Rosén as Sgt. Kurt
- Ragnar Widestedt as Colonel
- Birger Åsander as Prison Guard

== Bibliography ==
- Wright, Rochelle. The Visible Wall: Jews and Other Ethnic Outsiders in Swedish Film. SIU Press, 1998.
