= Monismanien Prize =

Prize awarded at Uppsala University

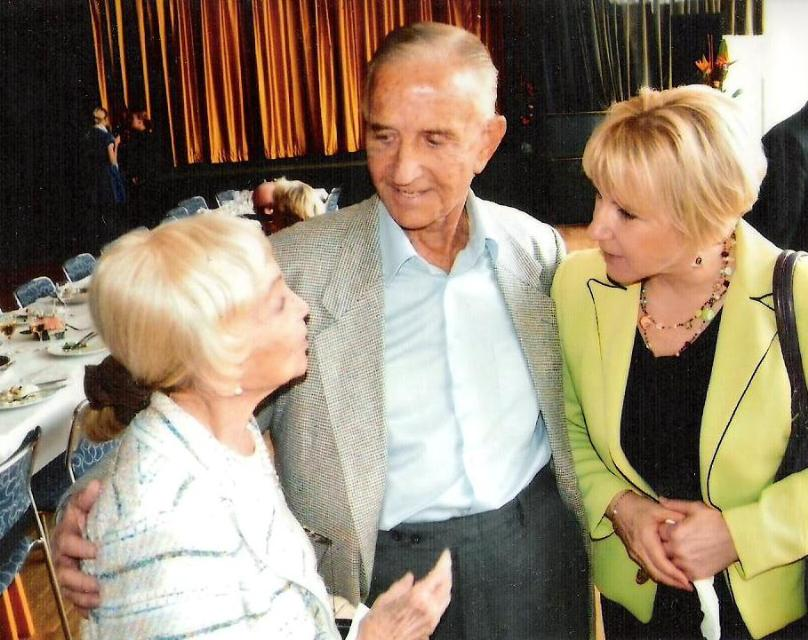
Monismanienpris Photo with Margot Wallström Kenne Fant and his wife

The Monismanien Prize (Monismanienpriset) is awarded by Göteborgs nation at Uppsala University. The prize is awarded to organizations and individuals who have made great efforts to defend freedom of speech.

== History ==
Monismanien Prize was founded in 1975 by Swedish filmmaker Kenne Fant (1923–2016) in memory of Torgny Segerstedt (1876-1945) who served as editor-in-chief of the newspaper Göteborgs Handels- och Sjöfartstidning. Kenne Fant received an award of SEK 124,000 from the Swedish Film Institute for his film Monismanien 1995 (1975) which takes place in a futuristic society with a dictatorship and no freedom of speech. He set aside this money as a basis for the Monismanien Foundation, which administers the prize. Today the foundation has grown significantly and the price is therefor considerably larger. The next Monismanien prize recipient will be announced fall 2022.

== Notable past recipients ==
- Alva Myrdal - 1976
- Simone Veil- 1977
- Lech Wałęsa- 1981
- Günter Wallraff - 1984
- André Brink- 1989
- Andre Brink - 1992
- Taslima Nasrin - 1995
- Yasar Kemal- 1997
- Desmond Tutu - 1999
- John Pilger - 2001
- Emily Lau- 2003
- Václav Havel - 2005
- Margot Wallström- 2009
- Herta Müller -2011
- Raif Badawi - 2017
- Ulla Carlsson - 2019
- No recipient due to a pandemic - 2021
- Eliot Higgins - Bellingcat - 2022

== Chairman of the Monismanien board ==
onismanienrepresentanten är i dag ordförande för Kenne Fants Stiftelse. Hens uppdrag är att leda arbetet för det fria ordet, utbilda nationens medlemmar om priset samt föreslå pristagare och arrangera en prisceremoni värdig denne pristagare. Monismanienrepresentanten väljs av Göteborgs Nations landskap. Numera är mandatperioden två år och därför delas oftast priset ut varannat år om inga extraordinära omständigheter inträffar.

- 1974->1975 - Torgny Segerstedt d.y. ordförande för stiftelsen och nationens Förste Kurator.
- 1975->1979 - Not confirmed
- 1979->1980 - Björn Jidéus
- 1981->1984 - Not confirmed
- 1984->1987 - Martin H:son Holmdal ordförande för stiftelsen och nationens inspektor.
- 1987->1989 - Jörgen Frotzler
- 1989->1993 - Not confirmed
- 1993->1995 - Pernilla Ewerby
- 1996->1998 - Annika Lund
- 1998 - 2000 - Olof Wilske
- 2000->2002 - Ola Vedin
- 2002->2004 - Anna Vogel
- 2004->2006 Johan Andersson
- 2008->2010 Ida Gustafsson
- 2010->2011 Beatrice Nybert
- 2011->2014 Sara Lilltheir
- 2014->2018 - Mimmi Lundin
- 2018->2020 - Elin Bergman
- 2020->2021 - Elias Collin (No recipient due to a pandemic)
- 2021->Today - Evelina Reuterfors
