= Göran Strindberg =

Swedish cinematographer (1917–1991)

- Born: 15 January 1917; Stockholm, Sweden
- Died: 13 March 1991 (aged 74); Stockholm, Sweden
- Occupation: Cinematographer
- Years active: 1938-1962

Göran Strindberg (1917–1991) was a Swedish cinematographer. Strindberg was one of the leading cinematographers in post-Second World War Sweden, replacing the earlier generation who had emerged during the silent era. He worked a number of times with the director Alf Sjöberg.

== Biography ==
Strindberg worked as a B-photographer at Europafilm 1937–1942, A-photographer at Sandrews 1942–1957 and as a freelancer 1957–1961. In the 1950s, he was mainly active in Germany, where he made a dozen films, including Robert Siodmaks Råttorna. He then changed medium and worked for Swedish Radio 1963–1964, was a teacher at the Film School 1964–1970 and course leader at the Dramatic Institute 1970–1982.

Strindberg is buried at Skogskyrkogården in Stockholm. He was the son of the sculptor Tore Strindberg, the nephew of the polar researcher Nils Strindberg and a member of the Strindberg family.

== Selected filmography ==
- I Killed (1943)
- Prince Gustaf (1944)
- We Need Each Other (1944)
- My People Are Not Yours (1944)
- Crime and Punishment (1945)
- The Rose of Tistelön (1945)
- It Rains on Our Love (1946)
- Desire (1946)
- A Ship Bound for India (1947)
- The People of Simlang Valley (1947)
- Maria (1947)
- Neglected by His Wife (1947)
- Song of Stockholm (1947)
- On These Shoulders (1948)
- Vagabond Blacksmiths (1949)
- Realm of Man (1949)
- Knockout at the Breakfast Club (1950)
- Girl with Hyacinths (1950)
- One Summer of Happiness (1951)
- A Ghost on Holiday (1951)
- In the Arms of the Sea (1951)
- Miss Julie (1951)
- Barabbas (1953)
- Stupid Bom (1953)
- Dance on Roses (1954)
- The Yellow Squadron (1954)
- Darling of Mine (1955)
- Master of Life and Death (1955)
- The Cornet (1955)
- Love (1956)
- Stage Entrance (1956)
- King in Shadow (1957)
- Mother Takes a Vacation (1957)
- Confess, Doctor Corda (1958)
- The Koster Waltz (1958)
- The Man Who Couldn't Say No (1958)
- Jons und Erdme
- Menschen im Hotel (1959)
- Marili (1959)
- Here I Am, Here I Stay (1959)
- The High Life (1960)
- Sweetheart of the Gods (1960)
- You Don't Shoot at Angels (1960)
- It Can't Always Be Caviar (1961)

== Bibliography ==
- Raimondo-Souto, H. Mario. Motion Picture Photography: A History, 1891-1960. McFarland, 2006.
