= Claes Thelander =

Swedish actor

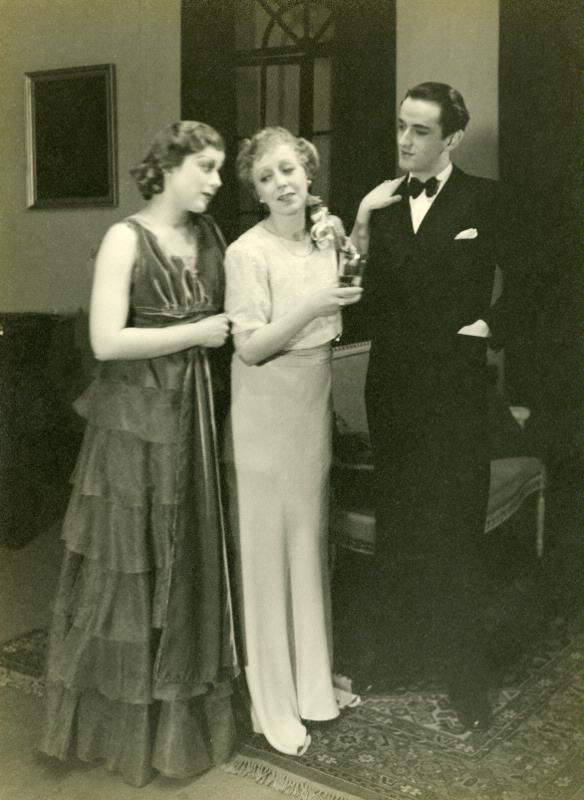
- Claes Thelander
- Born: 14 January 1916; Helsingborg, Sweden
- Died: 12 December 1999 (aged 83); Stockholm, Sweden
- Occupation: Actor
- Years active: 1938-1993

Claes Thelander (14 January 1916 – 12 December 1999) was a Swedish actor. He appeared in more than 40 films between 1931 and 1956.

== Selected filmography ==
- Julia jubilerar (1938)
- Take Care of Ulla (1942)
- My People Are Not Yours (1944)
- Turn of the Century (1944)
- We Three Debutantes (1953)
- Sir Arne's Treasure (1954)
- The Unicorn (1955)
- Night Child (1956)
- The Minister of Uddarbo (1957)
- Mother Takes a Vacation (1957)
- A Guest in His Own House (1957)
- Playing on the Rainbow (1958)
- A Goat in the Garden (1958)
- A Matter of Morals (1961)
