= Agneta Prytz =

Swedish actress (1916–2008)

- Born: Ingrid Agneta Prytz; 15 December 1916; Gothenburg, Sweden
- Died: 4 July 2008 (aged 91); Lidingö, Sweden
- Occupation: Actress
- Spouse: Gösta Folke (m. 1947; died 2008)

Agneta Prytz (15 December 1916 – 4 July 2008) was a Swedish movie and stage actress who appeared in thirty-six films over the course of her career. Prytz was the wife of Swedish director, Gösta Folke.

Prytz was born Ingrid Agneta Prytz on 15 December 1916 in the city of Gothenburg, Sweden. She worked in many roles at the Gothenburg City Theatre from 1942 until 1946. Her breakthrough film came in the Gösta Folke directed film, Neglected by His Wife, in 1947. Prytz and Folke also married the same year. She continued to be cast in several of his films and TV movies during her career.

Prytz appeared opposite fellow Swedish actors, Liv Ullmann and Max von Sydow, in a total of three films which were nominated for the Academy Award for Best Foreign Language Film: Jan Troell's The Emigrants in 1971; a sequel to The Emigrants, The New Land, which was also directed by Troell; and Sven Nykvist's The Ox in 1991. She also provided the voice of Gammel-Maja in the 1985 animated sequel, Peter-No-Tail in Americat (Pelle Svanslös i Amerikatt). Her stage credits included Who's Afraid of Virginia Woolf?.

Her last on screen performance came in the dramatic short, Gone Fishing (Man kan alltid fiska), which was directed by Angelica Lundqvist and released on 25 December 1995.

Prytz died on 4 July 2008 in Lidingö, Sweden, at the age of 91.

== Partial filmography ==
- 1947: How to Love - Ms. Pimpernel
- 1947: Maria - Birgitta Bertner
- 1947: En fluga gör ingen sommar - Expedit (uncredited)
- 1947: Neglected by His Wife - Tove Larsson
- 1948: Loffe the Tramp - Anna-Lisa
- 1948: On These Shoulders' - Edla, maid
- 1949: Realm of Man - Edla
- 1949: Stora Hoparegränd och himmelriket - Lillemor
- 1959: Enslingen i blåsväder - Lisa Bladh-Bernhard
- 1961: Lovely Is the Summer Night - Olivia Petrén
- 1962: Vaxdockan - Ms. Lind
- 1963: Kvarteret korpen - Neighbour
- 1965: Festivitetssalongen - Grip's Sister
- 1970: Ann och Eve - de erotiska - Woman
- 1971: Utvandrarna - Fina-Kajsa
- 1972: Klara Lust - Helge's Mother
- 1972: Nybyggarna - Fina-Kajsa
- 1973: Kvartetten som sprängdes - Little Mussy
- 1973: Smutsiga fingrar - Peter's landlady
- 1974: Vita nejlikan eller Den barmhärtige sybariten - Widow
- 1977: Bang! - Mrs. Leonardsson
- 1978: The Adventures of Picasso - Queen (uncredited)
- 1979: Repmånad - Helges mamma
- 1980: Sverige åt svenskarna - Mrs. Bengt
- 1985: Svindlande affärer
- 1985: Peter-No-Tail in Americat (Pelle Svanslös i Amerikatt) - Gammel-Maja (voice)
- 1991: The Ox (Oxen) - Old Woman
- 1993: The Sacred Mound - Gestur's Grandmother
- 1995: Man kan alltid fiska (Short) - Lilla damen (final film role)
