= Sonja Wigert =

Norwegian-Swedish actress (1913–1980)

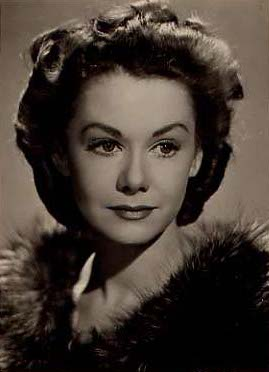
- Born: 11 November 1913; Notodden, Norway
- Died: 12 April 1980 (aged 66); L'Alfàs del Pi, Spain
- Occupation: Actress
- Years active: 1934–1960

Sonja Wigert (11 November 1913 – 12 April 1980) was a Norwegian-Swedish actress. She appeared in 34 films between 1934 and 1960. She was a spy for Swedish intelligence during World War II. Ingrid Bolsø Berdal portrayed her in the film The Spy.

== Early life ==
Wigert was born as Sonja Hansen to Major Sigvald Hansen and his wife Carmen Hansen nee Wigert in Notodden, Norway in 1913. She had two younger brothers, Knut and Erik. Wigert grew up in Skien, Norway. Wigert took ballet lessons in Skien. She made her stage debut at the age of ten. After completing her studies at the Statens håndverks- og kunstindustriskole in Oslo, she traveled abroad to study French in Paris and in Switzerland.

== Career ==
Following her travels, Wigert intended to study business and work in an office; however, when she won a small film role (after winning a competition in which an acquaintance had enrolled her), Wigert became a stage and film actress. After her acting debut, she adopted her mother's maiden name as her stage name. Wigert became a successful film actress in Norway, with films such as Fant (1937).

She moved to Sweden in 1939 with her Swedish husband, was successful in films there, also, and became one of the best known Scandinavian actresses of the time period. During this time she starred in films such as Her Little Majesty (1939), The Case of Ingegerd Bremssen (1942), Ombyte av tåg (1943), Count Only the Happy Moments (1944) and My People Are Not Yours (1944).

== Life as a spy ==
The Nazis defeated the Norwegian military in two months in 1940 and took control of the country. Sonja Wigert joined the Norwegian resistance movement in 1941. The Swedish military feared that the Nazis could also take control of Sweden. Because of her beauty and acting skills, Wigert was approached about becoming a spy for Sweden with the promise to help her get her father released from Nazi prison. In 1942, Wigert became a spy for the Swedish military; her codename was “Bill.”

The Swedish military sent Wigert to Norway to find information on German officers stationed there – including Josef Terboven, the Reichskommissar of occupied Norway. Wigert convinced Terboven that she could spy on Sweden for him. The information Wigert provided to the Nazis was approved ahead of time by the Swedish military. Wigert put herself in great danger when spying on the Nazis. If her activities had been discovered, both she and her family could have been subjected to Nazi torture. Nazi Germany never invaded Sweden.

== Post-war life ==
Wigert's father was released from Nazi prison, in due course. From 1942 until 1944, Wigert also worked for the American Office of Strategic Services. The Nazis eventually figured out that Wigert was only giving them information approved by the resistance. In response they started a smear campaign about Wigert by telling the public that she was a Nazi collaborator. No amount of effort by Wigert or her friends could convince the public that she was not a traitor.

Wigert continued her acting career after WWII, but never regained her pre-war popularity.

In 2005, twenty-five years after Wigert's death, the Swedish Intelligence Agency opened its war archives to the public and Wigert was posthumously vindicated in the public's eyes.

== Personal life ==
Sonja Wigert was married for the first time in 1939–1941 to the Swedish journalist and film scriptwriter Torsten Flodén and a second time from 1945 to the Danish Air Force captain Niels von Holstein-Rathlou (1910–1949), who died when his Supermarine Spitfire fighter crashed in Øresund in 1949. During the 1960s Wigert retired from her career and eventually moved to Spain.

== Death ==
Sonja Wigert died at age 66, on 12 April 1980, at her home and is buried in L'Alfàs del Pi, north of Benidorm in Spain.

== Selected filmography ==
- Song of Rondane (1934)
- Fant (1937)
- Life Begins Today (1939)
- Her Little Majesty (1939)
- Frestelse (1940)
- Her Melody (1940)
- Lucky Young Lady (1941)
- The Case of Ingegerd Bremssen (1942)
- Ombyte av tåg (1943)
- Count Only the Happy Moments (1944)
- My People Are Not Yours (1944)
- Blood and Fire (1945)
- Onsdagsväninnan (1946)
- Letter from the Dead (1946)
- One Swallow Does Not Make a Summer (En fluga gör ingen sommar) (1947)
- Vi flyr på Rio (1949)
- Alt dette og Island med (1951)
- Kvinnan bakom allt (1951)
- Hidden in the Fog (1953)
- The Dance Hall (1955)
