= Ragnar Falck =

Swedish actor

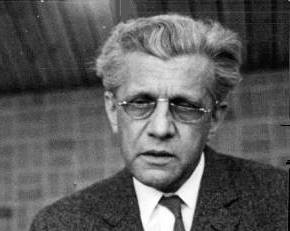
- Falck in 1965.
- Born: Johan Ragnar Falck; 23 July 1905; Stockholm, Sweden
- Died: 25 March 1966 (aged 60); Stockholm, Sweden
- Occupations: Actor, Director
- Years active: 1918-1963 (film)

Johan Ragnar Falck (23 July 1905 – 25 March 1966) was a Swedish stage and film actor. He also directed two films in 1944.

He was married to the actress Britta Brunius.

== Selected filmography ==
- The Two of Us (1930)
- International Match (1932)
- A Stolen Waltz (1932)
- Shipwrecked Max (1936)
- Sun Over Sweden (1938)
- Hanna in Society (1940)
- Blossom Time (1940)
- Bashful Anton (1940)
- Life Goes On (1941)
- Första divisionen (1941)
- En dag skall gry (1944)
- Barnen från Frostmofjället (1945)
- Widower Jarl (1945)
- Harald the Stalwart (1946)
- Only a Mother (1949)
- The Nuthouse (1951)
- Tarps Elin (1956)
- Laila (1958)
- The Wedding Day (1960)

== Bibliography ==
- Goble, Alan. The Complete Index to Literary Sources in Film. Walter de Gruyter, 1999.
