= Erik Strandmark =

Swedish actor

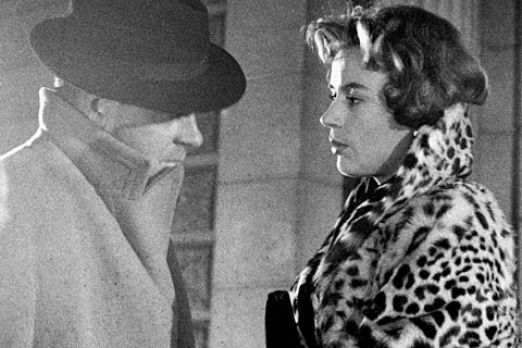
- Strandmark and Harriet Andersson in Woman in a Fur Coat (1958).
- Born: Erik Alfred Strandmark; 14 September 1919; Torsåker, Sweden
- Died: 5 January 1963 (aged 43); Trinidad and Tobago
- Occupations: Actor, director, scriptwriter
- Years active: 1944–1962
- Spouse: Bernadine Philip Naturnee (m. 1948)

Erik Alfred Strandmark (14 September 1919 – 5 January 1963) was a Swedish film actor. He was born in Torsåker, Sweden and died in a plane crash in Trinidad and Tobago in 1963.

== Partial filmography ==
- Live Dangerously (1944) - Corporal on the Train
- We Need Each Other (1944) - Guest at Café
- Den osynliga muren (1944) - Guest at the Restaurant (uncredited)
- Kungliga patrasket (1945) - Hans svärson
- Det glada kalaset (1946) - Hostel Guest (uncredited)
- In the Arms of the Sea (1951) - Holger Rehnberg
- U-Boat 39 (1952) - John Nilsson
- Love (1952) - Anton Tomasson
- Unmarried Mothers (1953) - Ned
- Barabbas (1953) - Petrus
- The Road to Klockrike (1953) - Hällman
- Sawdust and Tinsel (1953) - Jens
- Hidden in the Fog (1953) - Olle Lindaeus
- Speed Fever (1953) - Hebbe
- Storm Over Tjurö (1954) - Narrator (uncredited)
- Seger i mörker (1954) - Mellander
- Karin Månsdotter (1954) - Welam Welamsson
- Salka Valka (1954) - Steinthor Steinsson
- Wild Birds (1955) - Furniture dealer
- Kärlek på turné (1955) - Gråström
- The People of Hemsö (1955) - Carlsson
- Night Child (1956) - Leo Devell
- Kulla-Gulla (1956) - Karlberg
- The Hard Game (1956) - Wille Thoren
- The Girl in Tails (1956) - Blom
- Lille Fridolf och jag (1956) - Göransson
- Tarps Elin (1956) - Tryggve Linde
- Stage Entrance (1956) - Torén
- The Seventh Seal (1957) - Jonas Skat
- Vägen genom Skå (1957) - Walter
- Encounters in the Twilight (1957) - Victor Strömgren
- Night Light (1957) - Nice Ruffian
- Blonde in Bondage (1957) - Olle - Show Manager
- Mästerdetektiven Blomkvist lever farligt (1957) - Mr. Lisander
- The Minister of Uddarbo (1957) - Ris Erik Eriksson
- Woman in a Fur Coat (1958) - Lennart Hägg
- We at Väddö (1958) - Ströms-Janne
- No Time to Kill (1959) - Concierge
- Sköna Susanna och gubbarna (1959) - Joakim
