= The Unexcused Hour (1957 film) =

1957 film

- Directed by: Willi Forst
- Written by: Willi Forst; Kurt Nachmann; Helmuth Zander
- Based on: The Unexcused Hour by Stefan Békeffi and Adorján Stella
- Produced by: Herbert Gruber; Walter Tjaden
- Starring: Adrian Hoven; Erika Remberg; Hans Moser
- Cinematography: Günther Anders
- Edited by: Herma Sandtner
- Music by: Heinz Sandauer; Helmuth Zander
- Production company: Sascha-Filmproduktion
- Distributed by: Sascha Film (Austria); Herzog Film
- Release date: 29 August 1957
- Running time: 94 minutes
- Countries: Austria; West Germany
- Language: German

The Unexcused Hour (German: Die unentschuldigte Stunde) is a 1957 Austrian-West German comedy film directed by Willi Forst and starring Adrian Hoven, Erika Remberg and Hans Moser. It is a remake of the 1937 film of the same title. It was shot at the Sievering Studios in Vienna. The film's sets were designed by the art directors Karl-Hermann Joksch, Isabella Schlichting and Werner Schlichting.

== Cast ==
- Adrian Hoven as Dr. Hans Weiringk
- Erika Remberg as Biggi Jäger
- Hans Moser as Schuldiener Aichinger
- Rudolf Forster as Prof. Dr. Weiringk
- Chariklia Baxevanos as Elfriede Dolleschal
- Josef Meinrad as Fabian
- Alma Seidler as Resi
- Erik Frey as Prof. Adamek
- Elisabeth Epp as Frau Prof. Altringer
- Ursula Herking as Frau Moritz
- Elisabeth Markus as Schuldirektorin
- Senta Berger as Charge als Gymnasialschülerin
- Lotte Brackebusch as Frau Direktor Kandler
- Peter Frank as Richard, Cousin von Hans
- Uwe Friedrichsen as Hans Oblatek, Student
- Ruth Grossi as Mia
- Friedrich Jores as Dr. Schmidt
- Sylvia Lydi as Frau Prof. Mornau
- Reinhold Nietschmann as Hugo Jäger
- Harry Payer as Vater Jäger
- Olga Pluess as Wally Blumreich
- Ruth Poelzig as Martha Jäger
- Annelies Schmiedel as Resi
- Lore Schulz as Schülerin Grünauer
- Karl Schönböck as Prof. Hans Weiringer
- Anni Schönhuber as Turnlehrerin
- Kitty Stengl as Mutter Jäger
- Alice Treff as Frau Prof. Haslinger
- Gisela Wessel as Schülerin Kritschke
- Herbert Wilk as Herr Prof. Slatnik
- Liselotte Willführ as Frau Prof. Weide
- Inge Windschild as Fini, Schneidermamsell

== Bibliography ==
- Bock, Hans-Michael & Bergfelder, Tim. The Concise CineGraph. Encyclopedia of German Cinema. Berghahn Books, 2009.
- Frank, Stefanie Mathilde. Wiedersehen im Wirtschaftswunder: Remakes von Filmen aus der Zeit des Nationalsozialismus in der Bundesrepublik 1949–1963. V&R Unipress, 2017.
- Von Dassanowsky, Robert. Austrian Cinema: A History. McFarland, 2005.
