= Berta Hall =

Swedish actress

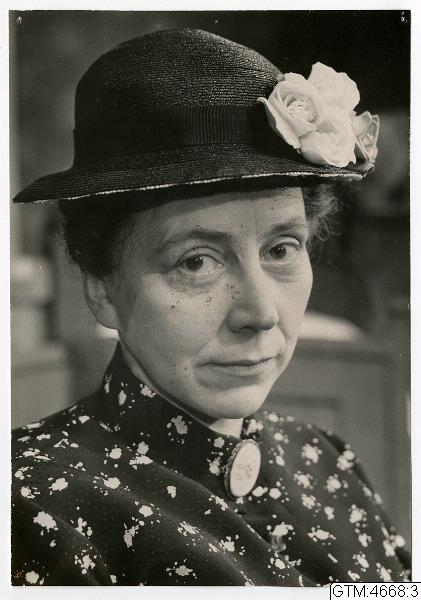
- Hall in "Änkeman Jarl" at Göteborg City Theater, 1960
- Born: 21 September 1909; Strömstad, Sweden
- Died: 6 June 1999 (aged 89); Gothenburg, Sweden
- Occupation: Actress
- Years active: 1942–1988

Berta Hall (21 September 1909 – 6 June 1999) was a Swedish film actress. She appeared in 18 films between 1942 and 1988.

== Biography ==
Berta Hall was the daughter of Carl Hall (1862–1929), owner and editor of the newspaper Norra Bohuslän. He sent her to Stockholm to attend Palmgrenska samskolan. After graduating in 1929, she began theater studies with Julia Håkansson.

== Selected filmography ==
- Port of Call (1948)
- One Summer of Happiness (1951)
- In the Arms of the Sea (1951)
