= Encounters in the Twilight =

1957 film

- Directed by: Alf Kjellin
- Written by: Per Anders Fogelström
- Based on: Encounters in the Twilight by Per Anders Fogelström
- Produced by: Allan Ekelund
- Starring: Eva Dahlbeck; Åke Grönberg; Ann-Marie Gyllenspetz
- Cinematography: Gunnar Fischer
- Edited by: Ingemar Ejve
- Music by: Bengt Hallberg
- Production company: Svensk Filmindustri
- Distributed by: Svensk Filmindustri
- Release date: 2 September 1957
- Running time: 93 minutes
- Country: Sweden
- Language: Swedish

Encounters in the Twilight (Swedish: Moten i skymningen) is a 1957 Swedish drama film directed by Alf Kjellin and starring Eva Dahlbeck, Åke Grönberg and Ann-Marie Gyllenspetz. It was shot at the Råsunda Studios in Stockholm. The film's sets were designed by the art director Gittan Gustafsson.

== Cast ==
- Eva Dahlbeck as Irma Sköld
- Åke Grönberg as Roffe Sköld
- Ann-Marie Gyllenspetz as Barbro
- Birger Malmsten as Olle Lindberg
- Inga Landgré as Alice Wiegel
- Erik Strandmark as Victor Strömgren
- Doris Svedlund as Elsa Jonsson
- Sven-Eric Gamble as Henry Jonsson
- Sigge Fürst as Guest at the Party
- Linnéa Hillberg as Mrs. Wiegel
- Helge Hagerman as Lund, Olle's Friend
- Carl-Axel Elfving as Svensson, Olle's Friend
- Ingrid Tobiasson as Karin, Victor's and Alice's Daughter
- Karl Brännlund as Guest at the Party
- Signe Lundberg-Settergren as Irma's and Barbro's Mother
- Curt Löwgren as Disturbed Neighbor
- Wilma Malmlöf as Guest at the Party
- Hanny Schedin as Irma's and Barbro's Aunt
- Henrik Schildt as Maitre d'
- Georg Skarstedt as Guest at the Party
- Kari Sylwan as Guest at the Party

== Bibliography ==
- Qvist, Per Olov & von Bagh, Peter. Guide to the Cinema of Sweden and Finland. Greenwood Publishing Group, 2000.
