= The Wedding Day (film) =

1960 film

- Directed by: Kenne Fant
- Written by: Lars Helgesson
- Produced by: Gunnar Lundin
- Starring: Max von Sydow; Bibi Andersson; Edvin Adolphson
- Cinematography: Max Wilén
- Edited by: Carl-Olov Skeppstedt
- Music by: Lennart Fors
- Production company: Nordisk Tonefilm
- Distributed by: Nordisk Tonefilm
- Release date: 3 October 1960
- Running time: 89 minutes
- Country: Sweden
- Language: Swedish

The Wedding Day (Swedish: Bröllopsdagen) is a 1960 Swedish comedy film directed by Kenne Fant and starring Max von Sydow, Bibi Andersson and Edvin Adolphson. The film's sets were designed by the art director Bibi Lindström.

== Cast ==
- Max von Sydow as Anders Frost
- Bibi Andersson as Sylvia Blom
- Edvin Adolphson as Johannes Blom
- Elsa Carlsson as Victoria Blom
- Jullan Kindahl as Asta
- Allan Edwall as Vicar
- Ragnar Falck as Organist
- Christina Schollin as Titti

== Bibliography ==
- Qvist, Per Olov & von Bagh, Peter. Guide to the Cinema of Sweden and Finland. Greenwood Publishing Group, 2000.
