= Erika Remberg =

Austrian actress (1932–2017)

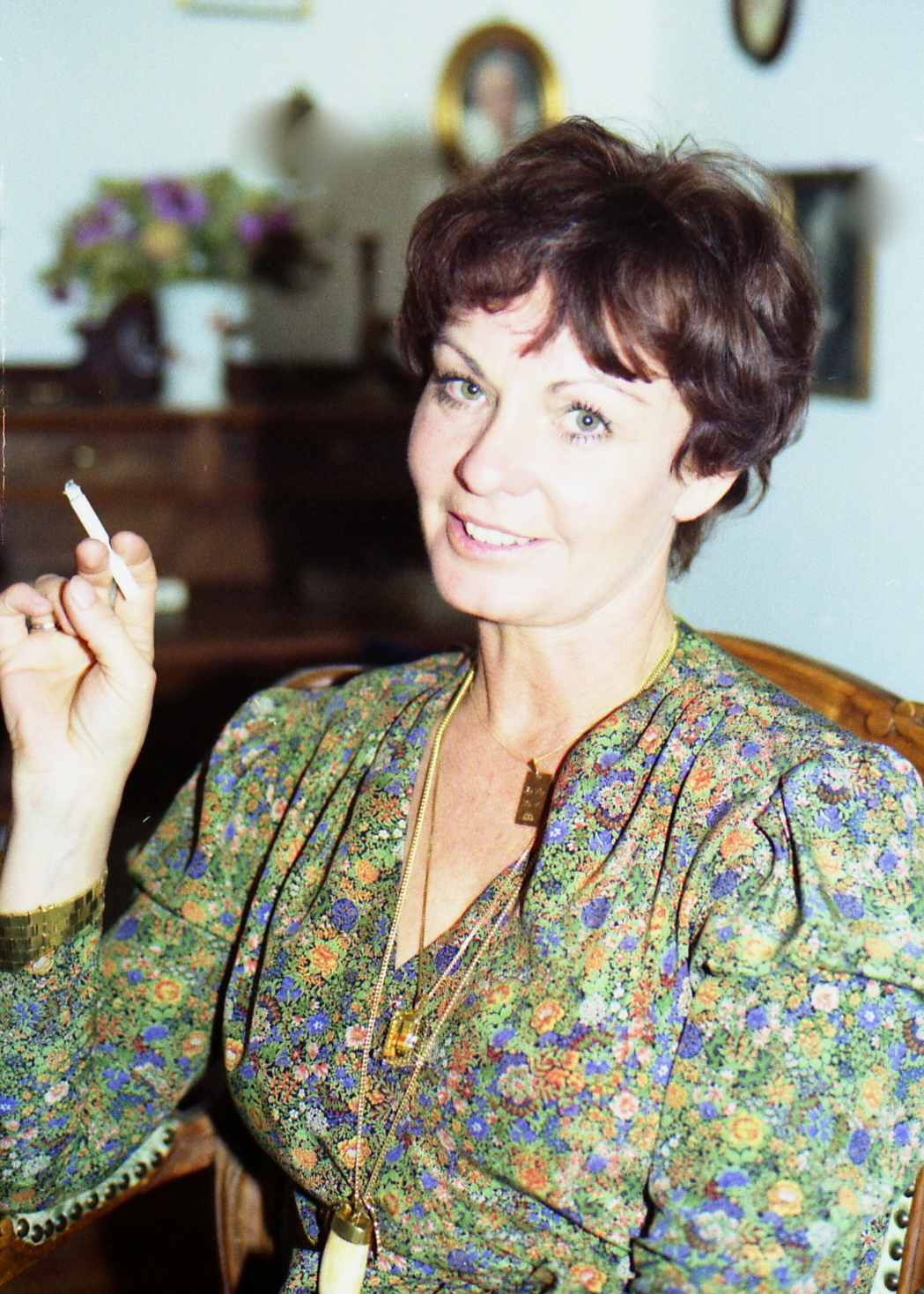
- Remberg in 1980
- Born: Erika Crobath; 15 February 1932; Medan, Indonesia
- Died: 10 November 2017 (aged 85); Benidorm, Spain
- Occupation: Actress
- Years active: 1950-1970
- Spouse(s): Walther Reyer (m. 1950; div. 1958) Gustavo Rojo (m. 1959; div. 1964) Sidney Hayers 1985-2000
- Children: 1

Erika Remberg (15 February 1932 – 10 November 2017) was an Austrian film actress. She appeared in 31 films between 1950 and 1970. She was born in Medan, Indonesia.

== Life ==
Erika Remberg was born in Indonesia, the daughter of a tobacco planter. During World War II, the family moved back to Austria. Erika attended a grammar school in Innsbruck. There she came into contact with an amateur theatre group and, at the age of 16, first stepped into the limelight. After further training and small acting roles, she joined the Exl-Bühne theatre company and, after its dissolution in 1956, finally found her way into German film.

At the Exl-Bühne theatre, she met the Austrian actor Walther Reyer and married the future Burgtheater actor in 1950. They have a daughter together, Veronika, who was born in Innsbruck in 1950.

As the partner of Klaus Kinski, Remberg quickly made a name for herself as a promising young actress in leading roles in films that, while artistically undemanding, were commercially successful. Until the early 1960s, she appeared in films such as Kaiserjäger (1956), Vienna, City of My Dreams (1957), and Laila (1958). In 1960, she was briefly married to the South American actor Gustavo Rojo. In 1966 she played Eva opposite Roger Moore in The Saint episode "The Helpful Pirate". As offers for good roles in Germany became increasingly scarce, she worked more and more abroad and finally retired from acting in the mid-1970s.

In 1981 she wrote the novel "Steckbriefe" (Purchase Profiles), which was made into a film. Afterwards, she withdrew from public life and in 1985 married director Sidney Hayers, with whom she had made the film Circus of Horrors (1960), 25 years earlier.

== Selected filmography ==
- The Violin Maker of Mittenwald (1950)
- Salto Mortale (1953)
- Nilgün (1954)
- Sun Over the Adriatic (1954)
- Hubertus Castle (1954)
- Beloved Enemy (1955)
- I Was an Ugly Girl (1955)
- Sarajevo (1955)
- Rosmarie kommt aus Wildwest (1956)
- The Unexcused Hour (1957)
- Laila (1958)
- Circus of Horrors (1960)
- Between Love and Duty (1960)
- Candidate for Murder (1962)
- Murder in Rio (1963)
- Saturday Night Out (1964)
- Cave of the Living Dead (1964)
- Living It Up (1966)
- Target for Killing (1966)
- The Saint, S5 E5, "The Helpful Pirate" (1966)
- So Much Naked Tenderness (1968)
- The Lickerish Quartet (1970)
