= Laila Andersson-Palme =

Swedish opera soprano (born 1941)

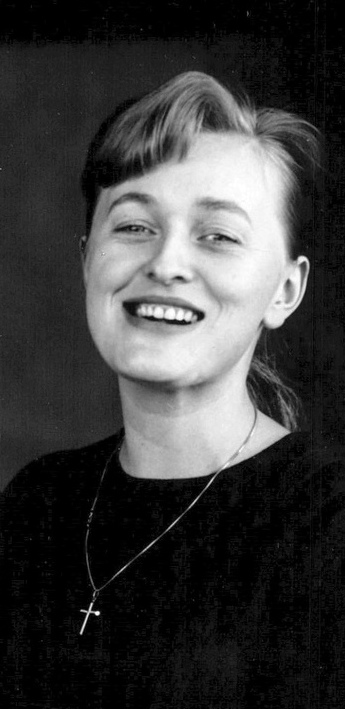
As Mimì in La bohème (1966)

Laila Andersson-Palme (born Laila Elisabeth Andersson, 30 March 1941) is a Swedish opera singer (soprano) who has been awarded the tile of Hovsångerska (court singer). She has performed a wide range of roles internationally and in recordings, including at the Royal Swedish Opera, Drottningholm Palace Theatre, and the Vienna State Opera, in operas written by Mozart, Verdi, Puccini, Strauss and Wagner.

== Career ==
Andersson-Palme studied with court singer Hjördis Schymberg, among others, and made her debut at the Royal Theatre in Stockholm in 1963, as Violetta (La traviata) in a college opera production, and was immediately engaged.

She began her career as a lyric soprano with a number of coloratura roles, including the roles of Susanna in The Marriage of Figaro, Queen of the Night in The Magic Flute, Constance in Die Entführung aus dem Serail, Fiordiligi in Così fan tutte, the title role in Madama Butterfly, Mimì and Musetta in La bohème, the title role in Alcina, Leonora in Il trovatore and Gilda in Rigoletto.

Andersson-Palme then moved on to more dramatic soprano roles such as the title roles in Tosca, Lulu, Jenůfa, Salome, and Chrysothemis in Elektra, Violetta in La traviata, Giulietta in The Tales of Hoffmann, the Marschallin in Der Rosenkavalier, Amelia in Un ballo in maschera and Lady Macbeth in Macbeth. According to Dagens Nyheter and Svenska Dagbladet, she received ten minutes of standing applause after Salome at the Vienna State Opera.

She ended her long career with highly dramatic soprano parts such as Brünnhilde in Der Ring des Nibelungen, Ortrud in Lohengrin, Venus in Tannhäuser and the title role in Richard Strauss's Elektra. She is one of only a few professional singers in the world whose careers have spanned high coloratura soprano and dramatic soprano.

She retired from opera in the 1995/96 season with performances of Elektra but returned the following season in Puccini's Tosca.

From 1984 she was married to the actor Ulf Palme, who died in 1993.

== Prizes and awards ==
- 1985 – Hovsångerska
- 1992 – Litteris et Artibus
- 1997 – Member of the Royal Swedish Academy of Music

== Performances ==
- Bern (Tosca)
- Grenoble, Karlsruhe, Deutsche Oper, Berlin (Brünnhilde in Die Walküre and Salome)
- Graz (Abigaille in Nabucco and Salome)
- Gelsenkirchen Musiktheater im Revier (Salome)
- Vienna State Opera (Salome)
- Rio de Janeiro (Salome)
- Catania (Salome)
- Montréal (Salome and Fidelio)
- Metropolitan Opera, New York (Salome)
- Washington D.C. (Fidelio)
- Bonn, Oslo (Il trovatore)
- Helsingfors, Århus (Wagner's Der Ring des Nibelungen)

== TV appearances ==
- Scenes from Verdi's Macbeth 1983
- Salome in Montréal, 1985
- Backanterna by Daniel Börtz after Euripides' The Bacchae, as Tiresias in the 1993 Ingmar Bergman film Backanterna

== Theatre ==
1961: A washerwoman in Yerma by Federico García Lorca, Bengt Ekerot (director)

== Selected discography ==
- Lundin, Dag, Havets klockor. Lyrisk svit. OPUS3. OP0001. 2001.
- Amarilli in Handel, Il pastor fido, "Scherzo in mar la naviella". Drottningholms slottsteater 1922–1992. Caprice CAP 21512 1993. Svensk mediedatabas.
- Teiresias in Börtz, Backanterna. Caprice CAP 22028:1-2. Även radiosänd. Svensk mediedatabas.
- Opera gala. Kungliga Teaterns orkester och artister. Conductor Kjell Ingebretsen. Bluebell. 2010. January 2013.
- Laila Andersson-Palme. Concert 10 April 2003, Kulturum, Stockholm. O. Löpare, piano. April 2018.
- Tosca with Rolf Björling, Fellici Cillario. Kungliga Operan, Stockholm. 20 September 1984. Sterling Records CDA-1837/38.
- Musetta in Puccini's La bohème. With Elisabeth Söderström, Gösta Winbergh, Björn Asker. Conductor: Kjell Ingebretsen, Kungliga Operan, Stockholm. Premiere Opera (USA) 2255–2.
- Marzellina in Beethoven's Fidelio. Berit Lindholm, Kolbiörn Höiseth, Sigurd Björling, Rolf Jupither. Conductor: Stig Westerberg. Kungliga Operan, Stockholm. 1965. House of Opera CD4108.
- Brünnhilde in Wagner's Die Walküre. Deutsche Oper, Berlin, 29 October 1986. Conductor: Heinrich Hollreiser. House of Opera CD84332.
- Brünnhilde in Wagner's Götterdämmerung. Den Jyske Opera, Aarhus, 6 September 1987. Conductor: Francesco Cristofoli. Sterling CDA-1813/1816-2. 4 CD. 2018
- From Queen of the Night to Elektra. Opera Arias Songs and Lieder. Sterling CDA-1806/1807-2. 2 CD. 2015
- Boldemann, Laci, Svart är vitt – sa kejsaren. Per Åke Andersson. Kungliga Operan, Stockholm. 1965. Sterling CDA-111/12-2. 2 CD. 2017. Svensk mediedatabas.
