= Tarps Elin =

1956 film

- Directed by: Kenne Fant
- Starring: Eva Dahlbeck
- Release date: 12 November 1956
- Running time: 96 minutes
- Country: Sweden
- Language: Swedish

Tarps Elin is a 1956 Swedish drama film directed by Kenne Fant.

The film was based on the novel Den söker icke sitt ("It Seeks Not Its Own") by Swedish author Sven Edvin Salje. The film was the debut of actress Maud Hansson.

== Cast ==
- Eva Dahlbeck as Elin Tarp
- Erik Strandmark as Tryggve Linde
- Ulf Palme as Kjell Loväng
- John Norrman as Tarp, Elin's Father
- Holger Löwenadler as Arvid Loväng
- Märta Arbin as Inga Loväng
- Carl Deurell as Botvid
- Wiktor Andersson as Beck-Lasse (as Viktor Andersson)
- Ragnar Falck as Håkansson (as Ragnar Falk)
- Hans Strååt as Vicar
- Bengt Eklund as Sixten
- Olof Widgren as Doctor
