= Ulf Palme =

Swedish actor

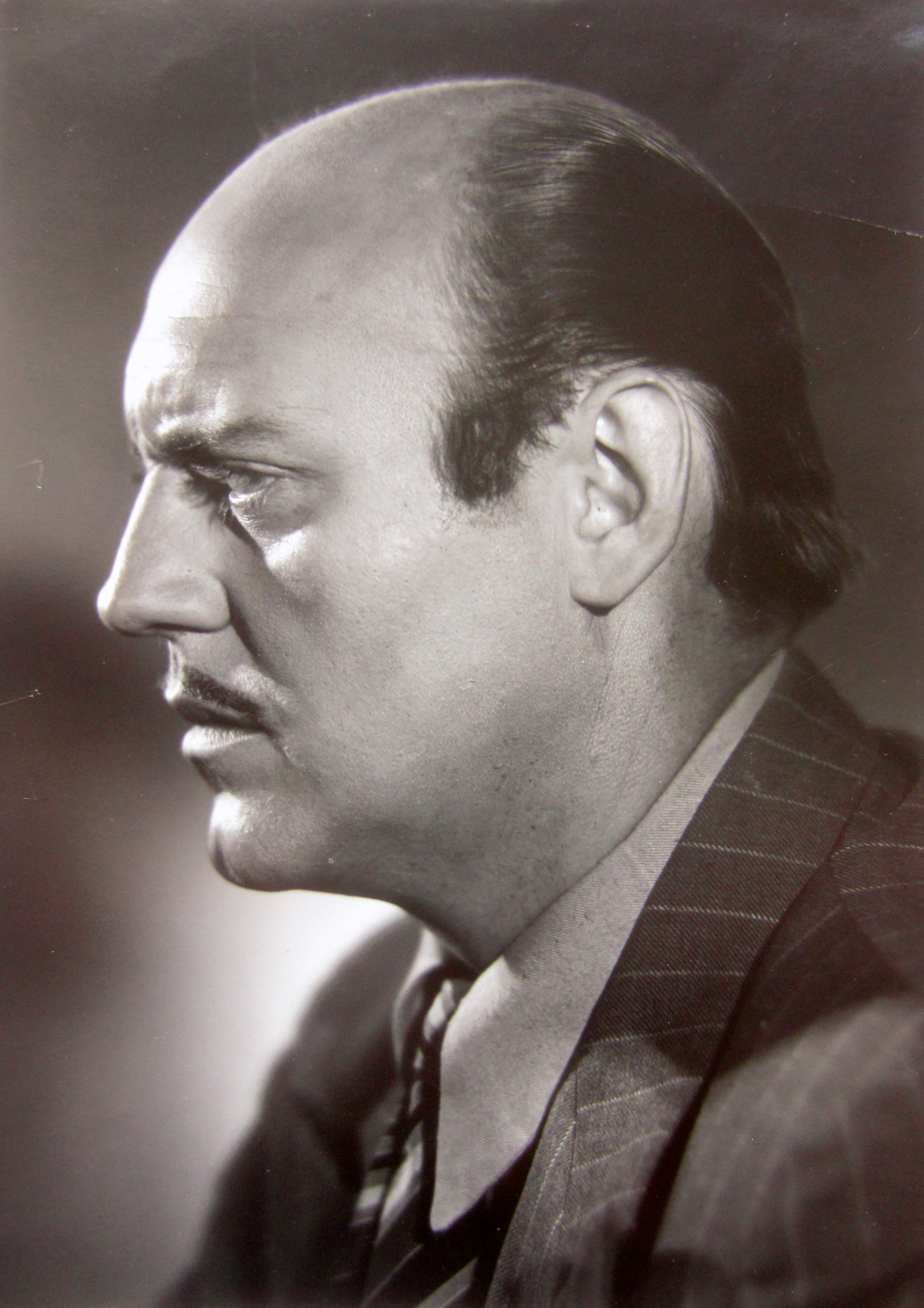
- Born: Ulf Henrik Palme; 18 October 1920; Stockholm, Sweden
- Died: 12 May 1993 (aged 72); Ingarö, Sweden
- Occupations: Actor, author, director
- Years active: 1945–1980
- Spouses: Anna Maria Larussa (m. 1953–1963) Laila Andersson (m. 1984)
- Relatives: Olof Palme (second cousin)

Ulf Henrik Palme (18 October 1920 – 12 May 1993) was a Swedish film actor. He was born in Stockholm and died in Ingarö.

== Partial filmography ==
- Black Roses (1945) - Gunnar Bergström
- The Serious Game (1945) - Ture Törne
- Möte i natten (1946) - Sune
- Sunshine Follows Rain (1946) - Mats, deras son
- Soldier's Reminder (1947) - Jerker
- Crime in the Sun (1947) - Rickard
- On These Shoulders (1948) - Kjell Loväng
- Prison (1949) - Man in Birgitta's Dream (uncredited)
- Realm of Man (1949) - Kjell Arvid Loväng
- Only a Mother (1949) - Hammar
- Girl with Hyacinths (1950) - Anders Wikner - Author
- While the City Sleeps (1950) - Kalle Lund
- This Can't Happen Here (1950) - Atkä Natas
- Miss Julie (1951) - Jean
- In the Arms of the Sea (1951) - Bo Winner
- Barabbas (1953) - Barabbas
- Our Father and the Gypsy (1954) - David Vallander
- Karin Månsdotter (1954) - Göran Persson
- Ung man söker sällskap (1954) - Albert Hansson
- Sir Arne's Treasure (1954) - Sir Archie
- Wild Birds (1955) - Harry
- Dreams (1955) - Mr. Henrik Lobelius
- La Sorcière (1956) - Matti
- Tarps Elin (1956) - Kjell Loväng
- Woman in a Fur Coat (1958) - Arvid Croneman
- The Judge (1960) - Psychiatrist
- The Counterfeit Traitor (1962) - Max Gumpel
- Hide and Seek (1963) - Roger
- Il diavolo (1963) - Il pastore protestante
- Heja Roland! (1966) - Ö.J.
- Hemsöborna (1966) - narrator
- Här har du ditt liv (1966) - Larsson
- Rooftree (1967) - Leo Wittö
- Doctor Glas (1968) - Rev. Gregorius, Helga's husband
- The Girls (1968) - Director
- Rötmånad (1970) - Richard
- Lockfågeln (1971) - Liljesparre (police officer)
- The Day the Clown Cried (1972) - Johann Keltner
- Smutsiga fingrar (1973) - Swahn, corrupt lawyer
- Fru Inger til Østråt (1975) - Peder Kanzler
- Drömmen om Amerika (1976) - Narrator (voice)
- Bang! (1977) - Johnny
- Marmalade Revolution (1980) - Per Hugo
