= Maria (1947 film) =

1947 film

- Directed by: Gösta Folke
- Written by: Sven Björkman; Gösta Folke
- Based on: Maria by Gustav Sandgren
- Starring: Maj-Britt Nilsson; George Fant; Stig Järrel
- Cinematography: Göran Strindberg
- Edited by: Lennart Wallén
- Music by: Nils Kyndel; Håkan von Eichwald
- Production company: Sandrews
- Distributed by: Sandrew-Baumanfilm
- Release date: 1 August 1947
- Running time: 88 minutes
- Country: Sweden
- Language: Swedish

Maria is a 1947 Swedish drama film directed by Gösta Folke and starring Maj-Britt Nilsson, George Fant and Stig Järrel. It was made at the Centrumateljéerna Studios in Stockholm. The film's sets were designed by the art director Bibi Lindström. It was based on the 1942 novel of the same title by Gustav Sandgren.

== Synopsis ==
A maid loses her job working for a family in a small town in Sweden. She encounters a truck driver who, after discovering she wants to be an actress, gets her a job in a film.

== Cast ==
- Maj-Britt Nilsson as Maria
- George Fant as Åke Bengtsson
- Stig Järrel as Movie Director Harry Sörbom
- Elof Ahrle as Max Andersson
- Georg Skarstedt as Carl Carlbom
- Åke Claesson as Gus Pettersson
- Agneta Prytz as Birgitta Bertner
- Nils Hallberg as Frasse
- Mimi Nelson as Sylvia
- Carl Deurell as Westlander
- Carl Reinholdz as Mechanic
- Torsten Bergström as Jonatan, Actor
- Hans Dahlin as Olsson, Actor
- Ivar Wahlgren as Lundgren, Actor
- David Erikson as Maria's Employer
- Anders Nyström as Bell Boy
- Hanny Schedin as Hat Shop Clerk
- Göran Strindberg as Photographer

== Bibliography ==
- Goble, Alan. The Complete Index to Literary Sources in Film. Walter de Gruyter, 1999.
