= Heja Roland! =

1966 film

- Directed by: Bo Widerberg
- Screenplay by: Bo Widerberg
- Based on: Den gröna draken by Bo Widerberg
- Cinematography: Jörgen Persson
- Release date: 29 June 1966 (Sweden)
- Running time: 96 minutes
- Country: Sweden
- Language: Swedish

Heja Roland! is a 1966 Swedish comedy film written and directed by Bo Widerberg. The film won the Guldbagge Award for Best Film and Thommy Berggren won the award for Best Actor at the 3rd Guldbagge Awards.

== Cast ==
- Thommy Berggren as Roland Jung
- Mona Malm as Hanna Jung
- Ulf Palme as Ö.J.
- Holger Löwenadler as Waldemar Vassén
- Ingvar Kjellson as Skog
- Carl Billquist as Svensson
- Lars Göran Carlsson as Mortell (as Lars Göran Carlson)
- Lars Amble as Sture Lennert
- Carl-Olof Alm as Man at Horse Race
- Madelaine Sundgren as Britt Lennert
