= Joe Hill (film) =

- Theatrical release poster
- Directed by: Bo Widerberg
- Written by: Bo Widerberg
- Produced by: Waldemar Bergendahl; Bo Widerberg
- Starring: Thommy Berggren
- Cinematography: Jörgen Persson
- Edited by: Bo Widerberg
- Music by: Stefan Grossman
- Production companies: Bo Widerberg Film; Sagittarius Productions
- Distributed by: Europafilm (Sweden); Paramount Pictures (United States)
- Release dates: August 25, 1971 (Sweden); October 24, 1971 (United States)
- Running time: 117 minutes
- Countries: Sweden; United States
- Languages: English; Swedish

Joe Hill is a 1971 biopic about the Swedish-American labor activist and songwriter Joe Hill, born Joel Emanuel Hägglund in Gävle, Sweden. It was directed by Swedish director Bo Widerberg and is a dramatization of Hill's life, depicting Hill's arrival as a poor immigrant in New York in 1902, his involvement with the Industrial Workers of the World (IWW), and his trial for murder, during which he defended himself.

The film stars Thommy Berggren as Joe Hill, while the rest of the cast were mostly unknowns in their first film roles. It is the only film that Widerberg made in the US.

The film won the Jury Prize at the 1971 Cannes Film Festival.

Joe Hill was mostly unavailable commercially for nearly four decades (though occasionally shown at special film club screenings in Sweden) until a restored and digitally remastered version was produced in 2015 by the National Library of Sweden. It is now available on DVD. The distributor is Studio S Entertainment, Stockholm.

== Cast ==
- Thommy Berggren as Joe Hill
- Anja Schmidt as Lucia
- Kelvin Malave as Fox
- Evert Anderson as Blackie
- Cathy Smith as Cathy
- Hasse Persson as Paul
- David Moritz as David
- Richard Weber as Richard
- Joel Miller as Ed Rowan
- Franco Molinari as Tenor
- Robert Faeder as George
- Wendy Geier as Elizabeth
- Liska March as Sister of Mercy
- Michael Logan
