= Peggy on a Spree =

1946 film

- Directed by: Arne Mattsson
- Written by: Erik Berggren; Börje Mellvig
- Starring: Marguerite Viby; Gunnar Björnstrand; Stig Järrel
- Cinematography: Sten Dahlgren
- Edited by: Eric Nordemar
- Music by: Jules Sylvain
- Production company: Kungsfilm
- Distributed by: Kungsfilm
- Release date: 8 June 1946
- Running time: 78 minutes
- Country: Sweden
- Language: Swedish

Peggy on a Spree or Peggy on the Loose (Swedish: Peggy på vift) is a 1946 Swedish comedy film directed by Arne Mattsson and starring Marguerite Viby, Gunnar Björnstrand and Stig Järrel. The film's sets were designed by the art director Bertil Duroj.

== Synopsis ==
Frank Bing, a famous singer originally from Småland, returns to Sweden from America via Stockholm's Bromma Airport.

== Cast ==
- Marguerite Viby as Peggy Dalin
- Gunnar Björnstrand as Harald Haraldsson
- Stig Järrel as Frank Bing
- Julia Cæsar as Ada
- John Elfström as Hall Porter
- Lasse Krantz as Director
- Gunnel Broström as Bibbi Berling
- Börje Mellvig as Gustaf
- Erik Berglund as Dalin

== Bibliography ==
- Qvist, Per Olov & Von Bagh, Peter . Guide to the Cinema of Sweden and Finland. Greenwood Publishing Group, 2000.
- Wallengren, Ann-Kristin. Welcome Home Mr Swanson: Swedish Emigrants and Swedishness on Film. Nordic Academic Press, 2014.
