= Kenne Fant =

Swedish actor (1923–2016)

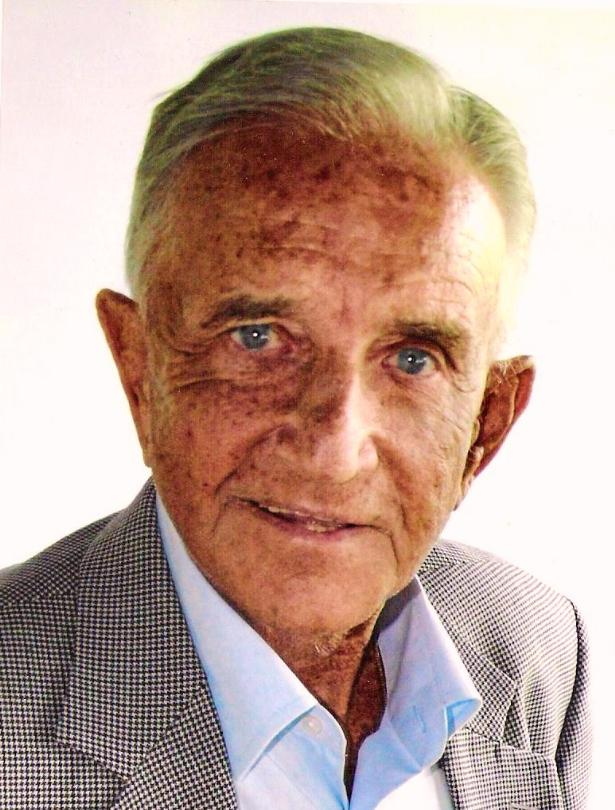
- Born: 1 January 1923; Strängnäs, Sweden
- Died: 29 May 2016 (aged 93)
- Occupation: Actor

Carl-Henrik "Kenne" Fant (1 January 1923 – 29 May 2016) was a Swedish actor, director, and writer.

== Early life ==
Kenne Fant was born in Strängnäs to Captain Tore Fant and Stina Fant (née Gustafsson). He was the younger brother of actor, director, and writer George Fant and first cousin of speech scientist Gunnar Fant.

== Career ==
Fant studied at the Royal Dramatic Training Academy from 1945 to 1949, and was at the Royal Dramatic Theatre from 1949 - 1950. He was hired as director of the Nordisk Tonefilm 1952 -1962, and became production manager of Swedish Film Industry (SF) in 1962. He was appointed CEO of SF from 1963. In 1980 he resigned to become a freelance writer. His 1962 film Adventures of Nils Holgersson was entered into the 3rd Moscow International Film Festival. In 1991, he published a biography of Alfred Nobel that included many references to the extensive collection of Nobel's letters.

Fant was appointed in 2005 an honorary doctorate in History and Philosophy of Science at Uppsala University.

== Monismanien Prize ==
In 1975, Fant established the Monismanien Prize for freedom of speech.

== Selected filmography ==
=== Actor ===
- Youth in Danger (1946)
- Life in the Finnish Woods (1947)
- The Poetry of Ådalen (1947)
- The People of Simlang Valley (1947)
- The Loveliest Thing on Earth (1947) as Göran Thome
- Each Heart Has Its Own Story (1948)
- Prison (1949) as Arne
- The Swedish Horseman (1949)
- Poker (1951)
- In Lilac Time (1952)
- Kalle Karlsson of Jularbo (1952)
- The Girl from Backafall (1953)
- All the World's Delights (1953)
- Dance, My Doll (1953)
- The Road to Klockrike (1953)
- The Beat of Wings in the Night (1953)

=== Director ===
- The Beat of Wings in the Night (1953)
- The Shadow (1953)
- Young Summer (1954)
- Tarps Elin (1956)
- The Minister of Uddarbo (1957)
- The Wedding Day (1960)
- Adventures of Nils Holgersson (1962)
