= Thommy Berggren =

Swedish actor

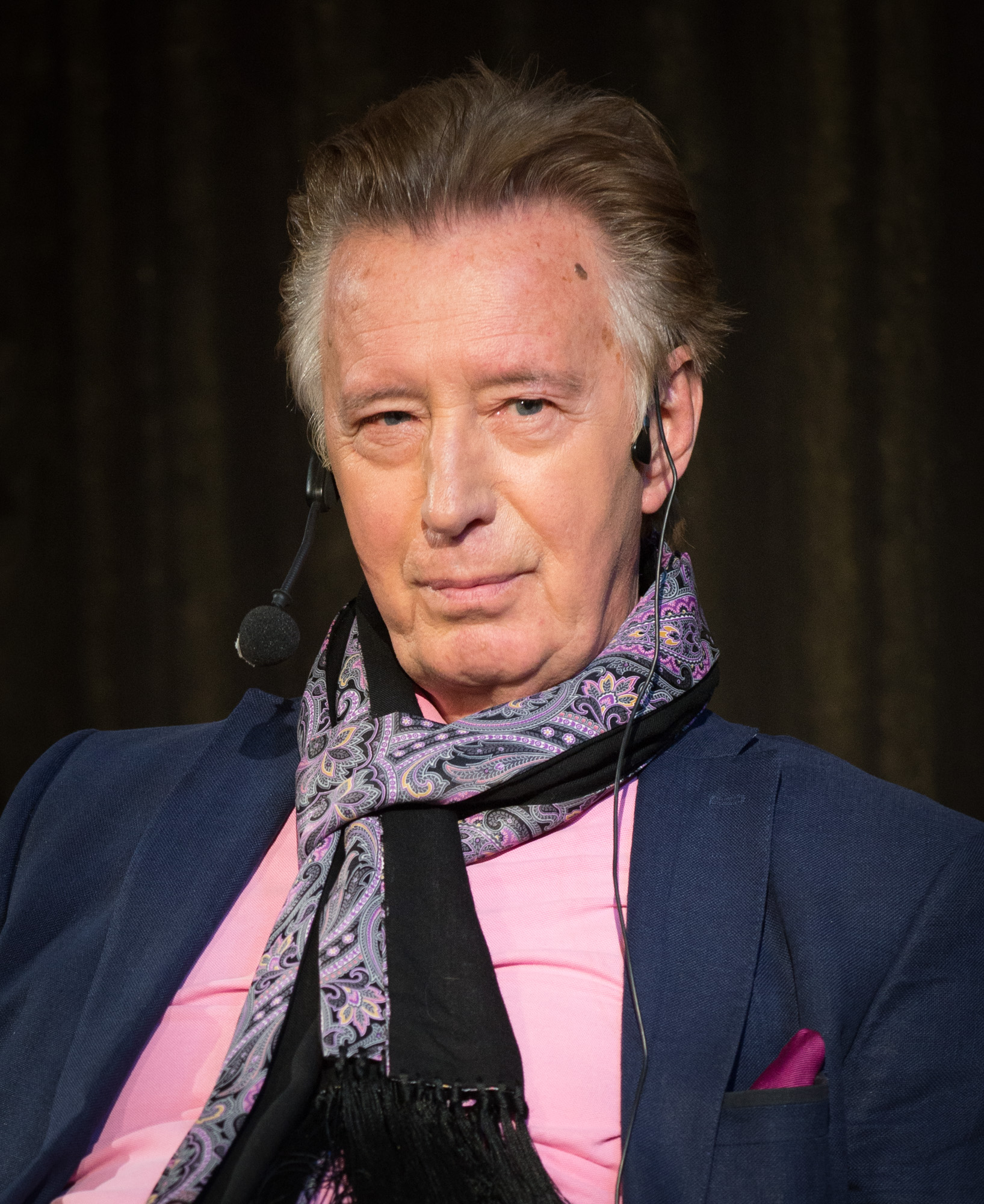
- Berggren in 2015.
- Born: Tommy William Berggren; 12 August 1937 (age 89); Mölndal, Sweden
- Occupation: Actor
- Years active: 1959–2003
- Partner: Monika Ahlberg
- Children: 3

Thommy Berggren (born Tommy William Berggren; 12 August 1937) is a Swedish actor. He was a frequent collaborator of director Bo Widerberg, and was primarily active between the early 1960s and mid-2000s.

== Early life ==
Tommy William Berggren was born on 12 August 1937, in Mölndal, Sweden, an impoverished working class district on the country's west coast. His father, William Berggren, was a sailor by trade and a socialist involved with the worker's rights movement in Sweden. His mother was employed at the local factory and was similarly politically inclined. When he was born, he suffered with a disease of the lungs, which caused him to have to stay in a hospital facility for one year.

Berggren's father was also an alcoholic. In Stefan Jarl's 2002 film The Bricklayer, a documentary about Berggren's life and career, he recounted an incident in which he had walked a great distance to meet his father at a train station, only to discover that he had not kept the appointment with his son. Instead, he had remained in town drinking. Berggren later defended his father, stating that he was not aggressive or abusive in any way, and that both of his parents were well-meaning people.

Berggren's father supported and encouraged his son's career choice as an actor. Believing that acting and the theatre were "immaterial", he encouraged his son to be "a better actor than the rest".

== Career ==
=== Stage ===
Berggren began to study acting at the Pickwick Club Theatre School in Gothenburg. He made his stage debut at the age of seventeen at the Atelier Theatre. He worked there for two years, until he was accepted into Gothenburg City Theatre's drama course in 1956.

In 1959, he was engaged as a regular player at the Gothenburg City Theatre, where he worked until 1961, when he was granted a position with the Royal Dramatic Theatre in Stockholm. In his first role there, he portrayed Nick in Ingmar Bergman's production of Edward Albee's play Who's Afraid of Virginia Woolf?. In 1993, he made his debut as a director at the Royal Dramatic Theatre with Harold Pinter's The Homecoming. He later directed plays at the Stockholm City Theatre, including August Strindberg's Miss Julie and Samuel Beckett's Waiting for Godot.

=== Film and television ===
In 1961, Berggren made his film debut in Pärlemor. The next year, he met aspiring director Bo Widerberg, who became his good friend and one of his most frequent collaborators. Like Berggren, Widerberg strongly believed that films needed to focus on human relationships, have a greater political significance, and be socially conscious. As early as 1960, Berggren declared in an interview that he only wanted to do films that he could truly stand for, to play people who developed – an attitude he has maintained through the years.

Berggren and Widerberg's first feature together was Barnvagnen, about a woman who chooses single parenthood instead of marriage. The two continued their partnership with 1963's Raven's End, a portrait of working class life in 1930's Sweden. Berggren portrayed Anders, a young aspiring writer who finds his hopes and dreams dashed upon the reality of an impoverished existence. In 1966, Berggren was awarded the Guldbagge, the Swedish equivalent of the Oscar, for Widerberg's Heja Roland!. The following year, Berggren starred in Elvira Madigan, Widerberg's first movie to have commercial success internationally.

The film was based upon the real life romance of Lt. Sixten Sparre and the circus performer Elvira Madigan. In 1889, the pair willfully abandoned their respective lives for each other, but after spending a brief time in Denmark, the couple exhausted their limited finances and the doomed relationship ended in suicide. Widerberg shot the film on a low budget, in natural light and without a script, allowing the actors to improvise freely and to take their time delivering their dialogue. His desire was to make the film appear as if it were a documentary of the couple's romance.

Berggren continued to focus on mainly Swedish productions, including a 1969 television adaptation of August Strindberg's play Miss Julie, about the class struggle between a count's daughter and his man servant, Jean. Berggren portrayed the role of Jean. In 1971, he worked once again with Bo Widerberg in a tribute to labor, Joe Hill, a film based upon the life of the Swedish–American agitator who helped to forward the worker's rights movement in the early 1900s.

Berggren's career on stage and screen continued to be influenced heavily by the "underdog syndrome", which he openly discussed in Stefan Jarl's The Bricklayer. His desire to portray outsiders in society remained apparent in his choice of film roles, from 1975's Giliap, in which he portrays a waiter with a longing to escape his life, to 1986's Gosta Berlings Saga where his role was that of an alcoholic clergyman. He also continued to work with Widerberg on several projects, including a 1988 television adaptation of Strindberg's The Father.

In 1999, while preparing for the opening of a play, Berggren suffered a heart ailment in which one of the valves began to malfunction. The illness caused him to drop out of the play and then to retire from the stage. In 2003, he appeared in his last film Kontorstid, about the often empty and meaningless routine of work and daily life. He stated that he felt as if the film and television industry were no longer creating quality work the way that they once did. In later years, he devoted himself to periodically directing plays at the Stockholm City Theatre and to his family.

His most recent project was a collaboration with Jarl on the screenplay of his 2013 documentary Goodness! The film focuses on the moral decline within economics. Berggren also appeared in the film, both as himself and in character, portraying the role of a greedy miser.

== Personal life ==
Berggren lives in Stockholm, Sweden, in Djurgården. Berggren had 3 children, a son and twin daughters, with cookbook author and restaurant reviewer Monika Ahlberg. He and Monika are now divorced. When questioned why he waited to have children, he stated that he "matured late", but that his family had come to mean more to him than he could have ever imagined. He said that he has never put his children to sleep at night without telling them that he loves them.

He also has a great love for art, citing Vincent van Gogh as one of his favorite artists. He stated that he has spent more time in the company of painters than actors.

== Political views ==
Berggren's political views were influenced by those of his parents, stating that he is like a bricklayer building upon the foundation that has been laid down by his father. Berggren does not wish to be a part of any film which glorifies violence. In an interview with the publication Expressen, Berggren noted that class struggle had been one of the strongest driving forces in his work, stating, "It is with me and it is within Persbrandt and it was in Strindberg. We're working boys."

== Awards ==
Berggren won the award for Best Actor in the 3rd Guldbagge Awards for his performance in Heja Roland!, and the award for Best Supporting Actor in the 34th Guldbagge Awards for his performance in The Glassblower's Children. He was also nominated for Best Actor in the 28th Guldbagge Awards for his performance in Sunday's Children. He won the Worker's Festival Prize (Czechoslovakia) for the film Joe Hill.

== Selected filmography ==
Year	Film	Role
1961	Mother of Pearl	Jan Wæbel
1963	The Baby Carriage	Björn
1963	Raven's End	Anders
1963	A Sunday in September	Stig
1965	Love 65	Actor
1966	Heja Roland!	Roland Jung
1967	Elvira Madigan	Lt. Sixten Sparre
1968	Black Palm Trees	Colett
1970	The Adventurers	Sergei Nikovitch
1971	Joe Hill	Joe Hill
1975	Giliap	Giliap
1979	Christopher's House	Kristoffer
1983	A Hill on the Dark Side of the Moon	Maxim Kovalevskij
1992	Sunday's Children	Erik Bergman
1998	The Glassblower's Children	The Emperor
2003	Office Hours	Bill
2013	Goodness	Self
