= Gösta Folke =

Swedish actor, screenwriter, and director (1913–2008)

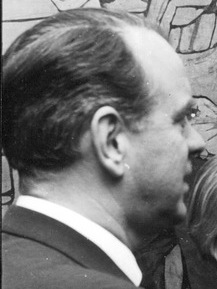
- Folke in 1962
- Born: 10 December 1913; Stockholm, Sweden
- Died: 14 April 2008 (aged 94); Stockholm, Sweden
- Occupations: Director; writer
- Years active: 1942–1983
- Spouse: Agneta Prytz (m. 1947)

Gösta Folke (10 December 1913 – 14 April 2008) was a Swedish actor, stage director and film director.

== Early life and career ==
He was born on 10 December 1913. In 1947, he married the actress Agneta Prytz.

From 1951 to 1957, he led the Uppsala City Theatre.

He led the Malmö City Theatre for 17 years, starting in 1960.

== Death ==
He died on 14 April 2009, at the age of 94.

== Selected filmography ==
- The Country Priest (1946)
- Kvinnor i väntrum (1946)
- Maria (1947)
- Neglected by His Wife (1947)
- On These Shoulders (1948)
- Realm of Man (1949)
- A Goat in the Garden (1958)
- A Lion in Town (1959)

== Bibliography ==
- Goble, Alan. The Complete Index to Literary Sources in Film. Walter de Gruyter, 1999.
- Wright, Rochelle. The Visible Wall: Jews and Other Ethnic Outsiders in Swedish Film. SIU Press, 1998.
