= On These Shoulders =

1948 film

- Directed by: Gösta Folke
- Written by: Karl Fredrik Björn
- Based on: On These Shoulders by Sven Edvin Salje
- Starring: Ulf Palme; Anita Björk; Holger Löwenadler
- Cinematography: Göran Strindberg
- Edited by: Lennart Wallén
- Music by: Erland von Koch
- Production company: Nordisk Tonefilm
- Distributed by: Nordisk Tonefilm
- Release date: 4 October 1948
- Running time: 103 minutes
- Country: Sweden
- Language: Swedish

On These Shoulders (Swedish: På dessa skuldror) is a 1948 Swedish drama film directed by Gösta Folke and starring Ulf Palme, Anita Björk and Holger Löwenadler. It was made at the Centrumateljéerna Studios in Stockholm and on location around Jämshög. The film's sets were designed by the art director Bibi Lindström. It was based on a 1942 novel of the same title by Sven Edvin Salje.

== Cast ==
- Ulf Palme as Kjell Loväng
- Anita Björk as Birgit Larsson
- Holger Löwenadler as Arvid Loväng
- Märta Arbin as Inga Loväng
- Keve Hjelm as Simon Loväng
- Agneta Prytz as Edla, maid
- Ingrid Borthen as Elin Tarp
- Carl Ström as Elis
- Ragnvi Lindbladh as Sonja Eriksson
- Oscar Ljung as Andreasson
- Carl Deurell as Botvid
- Erik Hell as Aron Loväng
- Börje Mellvig as Börje Loväng
- John Norrman as Mr. Tarp
- Artur Cederborgh as Måns-Erik Eriksson
- Ivar Kåge as Osbar
- Olav Riégo as Magnusson
- Georg Skarstedt as Blind-Ove
- Magnus Kesster as Old Gypsy
- Lars Kåge as Gösta Osbar
- Sif Ruud as Mrs. Andreasson
- Astrid Bodin as Gunda Fredriksson
- Hanny Schedin as Sonja's mother

== Bibliography ==
- Qvist, Per Olov & von Bagh, Peter. Guide to the Cinema of Sweden and Finland. Greenwood Publishing Group, 2000.
- Sundholm, John . Historical Dictionary of Scandinavian Cinema. Scarecrow Press, 2012.
