= Stora Wäsby Castle =

Building in Upplands Väsby, Sweden

Coordinates: 59°31′57″N 17°54′20″E

- Sweden
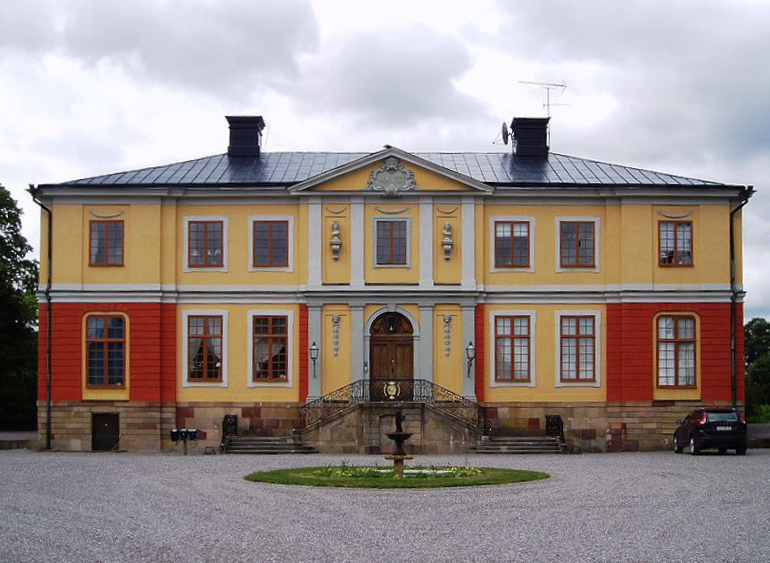

Stora Wäsby Castle is a manor house in Upplands Väsby, Sweden.

== History ==
Stora Wäsby was an estate dating during the Middle Ages. In 1730, Stora Wäsby became a fideicommissary within the De Geer family. The main building is a two-story stone house in Rococo architecture. The manor house was built in the 1760s according to drawings by the architect Carl Hårleman (1700–1753) but was completed under the direction of architect Jean Eric Rehn (1717–1793) after Hårleman's death. Adjacent to the manor is the Baroque Park, which was laid out in the 17th century. During the 1920s, architect Isak Gustaf Clason worked at Stora Väsby to carry out interior and exterior renovations. Stora Wäsby consists of about ten buildings, all of which are listed.

== See also ==
- List of castles in Sweden
