= Börje Mellvig =

Swedish actor

- Born: 23 November 1911; Malmö Sankt Pauli parish
- Died: 7 November 1998 (aged 86); Hedvig Eleonora and Oscar Parish
- Resting place: Norra begravningsplatsen

Mellvig in the 1952 movie In Lilac Time

Harald Filip Börje Mellvig (23 November 1911 – 7 November 1998) was a Swedish actor, screenwriter, director and lyricist. He is buried at Norra begravningsplatsen in Solna Municipality, Stockholm County. Börje Mellvig was born in Malmö and was the older brother of author Folke Mellvig. He died in Stockholm, aged 86.

== Filmography ==
- The People of Bergslagen (1937)
- Lucky Young Lady (1941)
- The Heavenly Play (1942)
- En vår i vapen (1943)
- Elvira Madigan (1943)
- The Forest Is Our Heritage (1944)
- Nyordning på Sjögårda (1944)
- Live Dangerously (1944)
- The Green Lift (1944)
- Skipper Jansson (1944)
- Den heliga lögnen (1944)
- Tired Theodore (1945)
- Kungliga patrasket (1945)
- En förtjusande fröken (1945)
- Motherhood (1945)
- Crime and Punishment (1945)
- When the Meadows Blossom (1946)
- Kristin Commands (1946)
- Peggy on a Spree (1946)
- Love Goes Up and Down (1946)
- Incorrigible (1946)
- On These Shoulders (1948)
- Kärlek, solsken och sång (1948)
- Sven Tusan (1949)
- Vagabond Blacksmiths (1949)
- Prison (1949)
- Jungfrun på Jungfrusund (1949)
- Dangerous Spring (1949)
- The Street (1949)
- Jack of Hearts (1950)
- My Friend Oscar (1951)
- Four Times Love (1951)
- Customs Officer Bom (1951)
- In Lilac Time (1952)
- Love (1952)
- Bill Bergson and the White Rose Rescue (1953)
- Dance, My Doll (1953)
- Marianne (1953)
- Dance in the Smoke (1954)
- Young Summer (1954)
- Smiles of a Summer Night (1955)
- Janne Vängman och den stora kometen (1955)
- Blue Sky (1955)
- When the Mills are Running (1956)
- Suss gott (1956)
- The Halo Is Slipping (1957)
- Lille Fridolf blir morfar (1957)
- 91:an Karlsson slår knock out (1957)
- Miss April (1958)
- Tre önskningar (1960)
- Do You Believe in Angels? (1961)
- Ett drömspel(1963)
- Tre dar på luffen (1964)
- Som hon bäddar får han ligga (1970)
- Söderkåkar(1970)
- Grisjakten (1970)
- Lockfågeln (1971)
- Den vita stenen(1973)
- What the Swedish Butler Saw (1975)
- Raskenstam (1983)
- I morgon var en dröm (1990)

== Screenwriter ==
- Malin går hem (1953)
- Peggy på vift (1946)
- Fem i tolv (1945)

== Director ==
- Tornebygd (1943)
