= Ingvar Kjellson =

Swedish actor

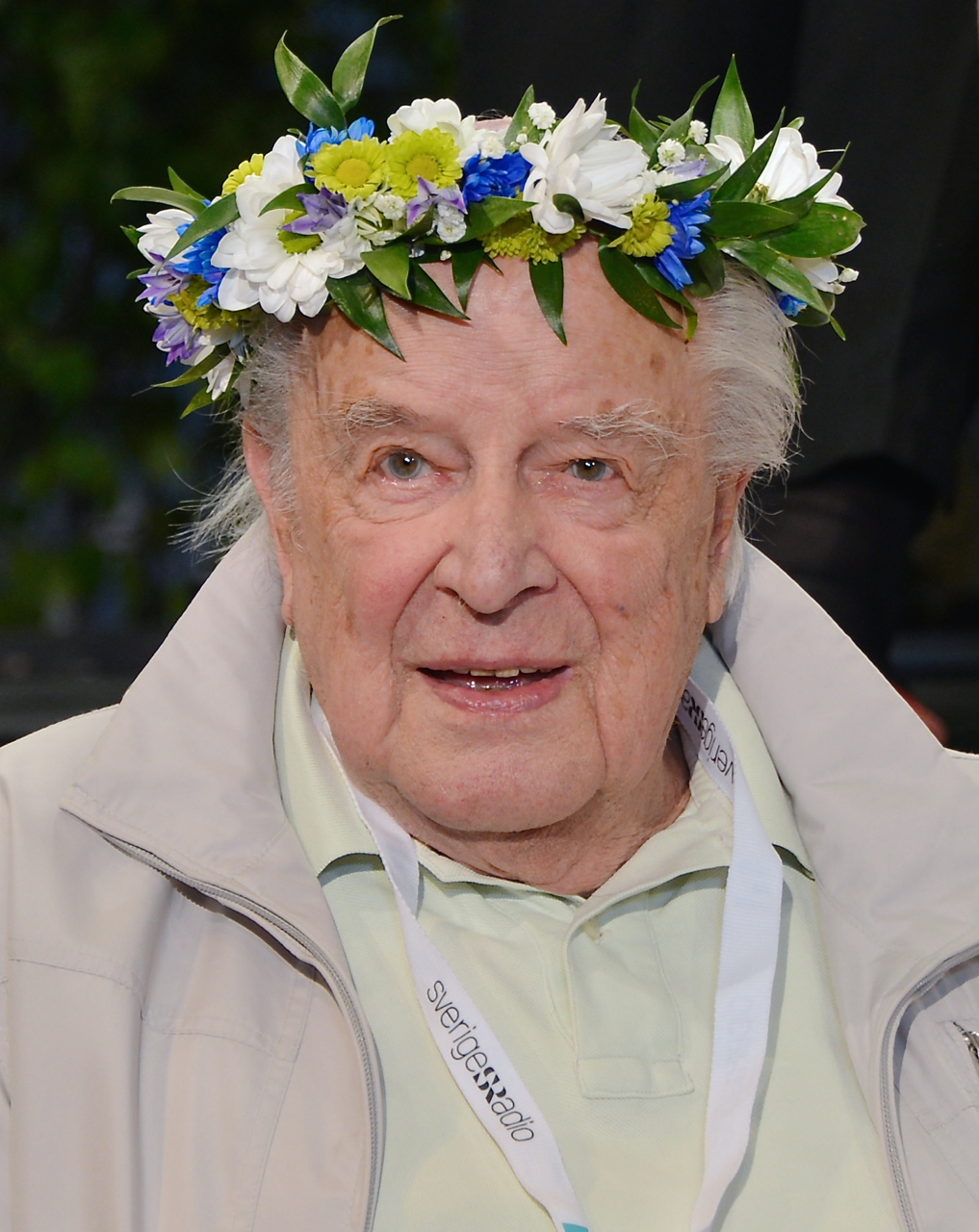
- Kjellson in 2013
- Born: Anders Ingvar Kjell Kjellson; 20 May 1923; Linköping, Sweden
- Died: 18 December 2014 (aged 91); Danderyd, Sweden
- Occupations: Actor, director, theater manager
- Years active: 1946–2012
- Spouse: Meta Velander (m. 1949)
- Children: 2

Anders Ingvar Kjell Kjellson (20 May 1923 – 18 December 2014) was a Swedish stage and film actor. Kjellson was born in Kärna, Östergötland County. He was accepted at the Royal Dramatic Training Academy in 1946. He worked as an actor at various theatres, and was part of the permanent ensemble at the Royal Dramatic Theatre from 1964. He had notable roles in a number of plays including Hedda Gabler, The Wild Duck, The Beggars' Opera and Twelfth Night. In 2013, he played the old servant Firs in The Cherry Orchard at Stockholm City Theatre.

He also worked in films including Zorn, Raskenstam, and Jazzgossen.

Kjellson won the Eugene O'Neill Award in 1978. He died at the age of 91 on 18 December 2014 of pneumonia. He was married to actress Meta Velander until his death.

== Selected filmography ==
- Tre söner gick till flyget (1945) - Young Man Playing Piano (uncredited)
- Blåjackor (1945) - Aspirant Strid (uncredited)
- The Bells of the Old Town (1946) - Guest at the Party at 'Bristol' (uncredited)
- In the Arms of the Sea (1951) - Third Mate
- Dance in the Smoke (1954) - Snål-Jampe
- Taxi 13 (1954) - Artist
- Seger i mörker (1954) - Engineer Borg
- Karin Månsdotter (1954) - Hakon Ladugårdsfogde - Guard at Gripsholm Castle (uncredited)
- The Yellow Squadron (1954) - Minor Role (uncredited)
- Mord, lilla vän (1955) - Erik Ljungdahl
- The Girl in the Rain (1955) - Klas
- The Staffan Stolle Story (1956) - Rabites, ökenskurk
- Swing it, fröken (1956) - Robert Roos
- Den långa julmiddagen (1956) - Charles
- The Song of the Scarlet Flower (1956) - Falk
- Summer Place Wanted (1957) - Radio Theatre (voice, uncredited)
- The Minister of Uddarbo (1957) - Doctor
- The Jazz Boy (1958) - Partygäst
- Swinging at the Castle (1959) - Vicar (uncredited)
- Pärlemor (1961) - Pawnbroker
- En nolla för mycket (1962) - Fredrik
- Kort är sommaren (1962) - The Count
- Hide and Seek (1963) - Prison Governor
- Wild West Story (1964) - Judge
- Heja Roland! (1966) - Skog
- The Girls (1968) - Olle
- Black Palm Trees (1968) - Consul
- Shame (1968) - Oswald, lärare i förhörslokalen
- Het snö (1968) - Police Inspector Nordström
- Made in Sweden (1969) - Niklas Hedström
- The Bookseller Gave Up Bathing (1969) - Elim Svensson
- Grisjakten (1970) - Gustav Rosen
- Ministern (1970) - Driver
- The Aristocats (1970) - Edgar Balthazar (Swedish voice)
- Robin Hood (1973) - Prince John and King Richard (Swedish voice)
- Vita Nejlikan (1974) - James
- Måndagarna med Fanny (1977) - Hilding Eriksson
- Chez Nous (1978) - Elmgren
- Marmalade Revolution (1980) - Editor
- Sverige åt svenskarna (1980) - Sir John
- The Flight of the Eagle (1982) - Alfred Nobel
- Raskenstam (1983) - Ludvig af Tidaholm
- Samson og Sally (1984) - (voice)
- Svindlande affärer (1985) - Arvidsson
- Gösta Berlings saga (1986, TV Mini-Series) - Sintram
- The Journey to Melonia (1989) - Captain Christmas tree (voice)
- Den ofrivillige golfaren (1991) - Rutger
- Zorn (1994) - Minister Åkerman
- Pettson och Findus – Kattonauten (2000) - Kungen (voice)
- The Last Sentence (2012) - Pehr Eklund (final film role)
