= Raven's End =

- Swedish poster
- Directed by: Bo Widerberg
- Written by: Bo Widerberg
- Produced by: Waldemar Bergendahl
- Starring: Thommy Berggren; Keve Hjelm
- Cinematography: Jan Lindeström
- Edited by: Wic Kjellin
- Release date: 26 December 1963
- Running time: 101 minutes
- Country: Sweden
- Language: Swedish

Raven's End (Swedish: Kvarteret Korpen) is a 1963 Swedish drama film directed by Bo Widerberg, about an aspiring working-class writer in Malmö. The story bears some similarities to Widerberg's own background, although he claimed it to be entirely fictional.

== Plot ==
In the mid-1930s, Anders dreams of becoming a writer. His friend Sixten dreams of becoming a football player so he can go to Paris and meet prostitutes in fur. Anders' ambitions are supported by his girlfriend, Elsie, and his parents. His mother supports the family by doing laundry, while his father, who is unemployed, struggles with alcohol and gambling.

Anders sends a manuscript for a book he has written about the block they live in to a publisher in Stockholm. He is asked to come to Stockholm and discuss the book, which excites his father. However, the publisher declines to publish the book, and when Anders returns, they all become very disappointed.

Elsie becomes pregnant with Anders' child. Anders seeks advice from his father, but his father is drunk, and they end up fighting. The father blames his wife for all the misery they are suffering, attributing it to an affair she once had. The mother blames the father, believing his violent behavior led to her infidelity.

Anders decides to leave his family, his pregnant girlfriend, and all the misery behind. He joins Sixten, and they both travel to Stockholm.

== Cast ==
- Thommy Berggren as Anders
- Keve Hjelm as His Father
- Emy Storm as His Mother
- Christina Frambäck as Elsie
- Ingvar Hirdwall as Sixten
- Agneta Prytz as Neighbour
- Fritiof Nilsson Piraten as himself
- Nina Widerberg as Nina

== Production ==
The film was shot on location in a run-down Malmö block that was soon to be demolished. Locals were used as extras to strengthen the feeling of authenticity.

== Awards and nominations ==
At the 1st Guldbagge Awards Keve Hjelm was awarded the Guldbagge for Best Actor. The film was nominated for the Academy Award for Best Foreign Language Film. It was also entered into the official selection at the 1964 Cannes Film Festival, competing for the Palme d'Or.

== See also ==
- List of submissions to the 37th Academy Awards for Best Foreign Language Film
- List of Swedish submissions for the Academy Award for Best Foreign Language Film
