= Erland von Koch =

Swedish composer (1910–2009)

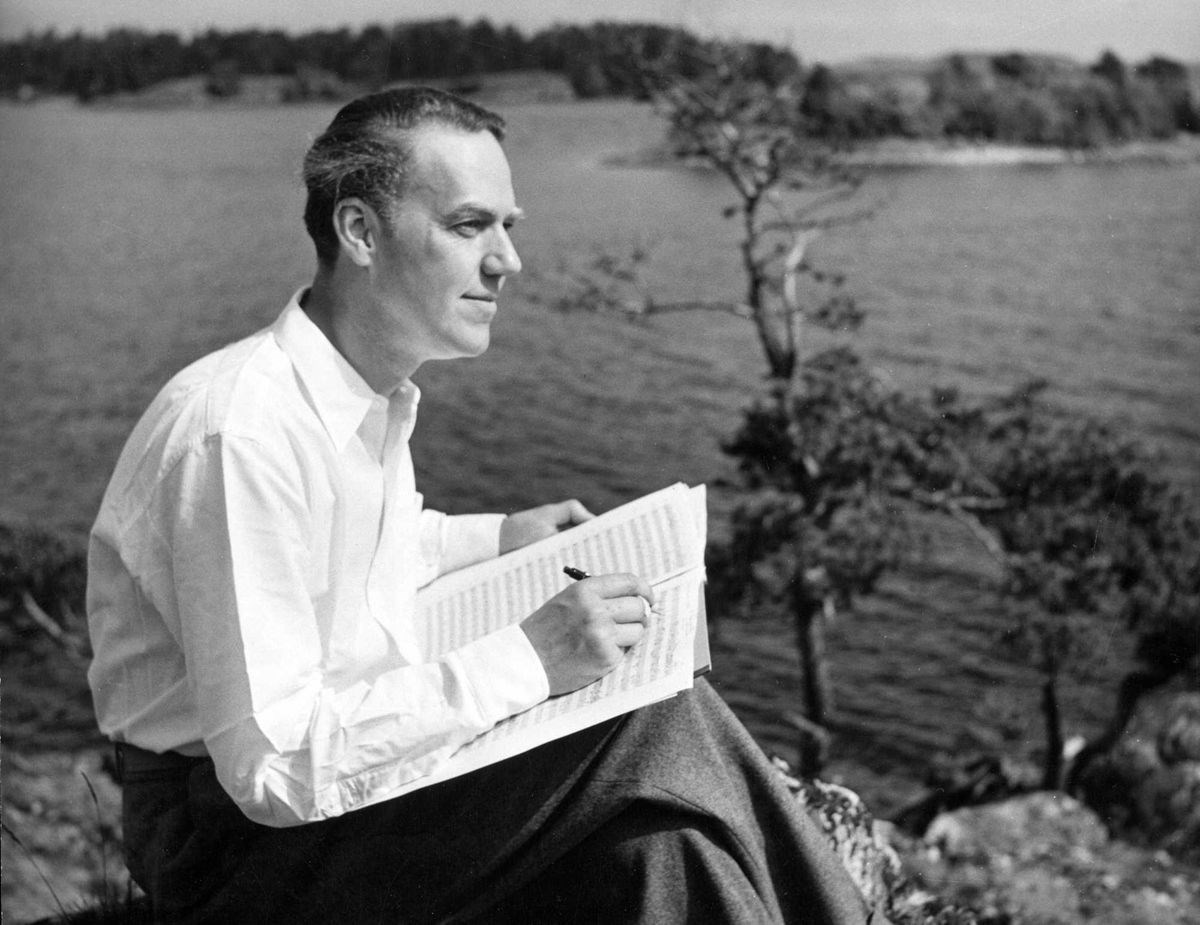
Erland von Koch at his summer residence in Ornö, Sweden, in 1952.

Sigurd Christian Jag Erland Vogt von Koch (26 April 1910 – 31 January 2009) was a Swedish composer. He wrote symphonies, ballets, an opera, and other compositions, including music for film.

== Life and career ==
Born in Stockholm as the son of composer Sigurd von Koch (1879–1919), Erland von Koch studied at the Stockholm Conservatory from 1931 to 1935 and subsequently passed the advanced choirmaster and organist examinations. Between 1936 and 1938, he lived in Germany and France in order to pursue studies in composition with Paul Höffer, conducting with Clemens Krauss, and piano with Claudio Arrau. Later, he took private classes with Tor Mann in Sweden.

Teaching at the Karl Wohlfarts Musikschule from 1939 to 1945, von Koch also spent the final two years of this period working as a sound expert and choirmaster for radio broadcasting. He composed much music for the Swedish film industry. From 1953 to 1975, he was lecturer in harmony at the Stockholm Conservatory, where he was appointed a professor in 1968.

Von Koch became a member of the Royal Swedish Academy of Music in 1957. He has received numerous other honors and prizes at both national and international levels for his compositions. He has written six symphonies (of which the fifth, Lapponica, is dedicated to the Sami people), twelve Scandinavian Dances, one opera (Pelle Svanslös), and five ballets, as well as music for wind orchestra.

Even in his nineties he composed/studied every day. His works can be described as uncomplicated and his motto was always to "keep the melody".

== Selected compositions ==
=== Music for the stage ===
- Opera: Pelle Svanslös (1948)
- Ballet: Askungen (1961–63)

=== Film music ===
- including for Ingmar Bergman: (Crisis, A Ship to India, It Rains on Our Love, Music in Darkness, Port of Call, Prison), as well as Kvinnan bakom allt, Den vita katten, Girl with Hyacinths, Dynamit, När ängarna blommar.

=== Orchestral music ===
- Ballett-overture for large orchestra (1943, rev 1956)
- Nordiskt Capriccio, Op. 26 (1943)
- Six symphonies: No. 2 (1945) Sinfonia dalecarlia, No. 4 (1952–53, rev 1963) Sinfonia seria, No. 5 Lapponica (1977), No. 6 Salvare la terra (1992)
- Viola concerto, Op. 33 (1946, rev 1966)
- Sinfonietta, Op. 44 (1949)
- Cello concerto (1951, rev 1966)
- Oxbergvariationer (1956)
- Dance rhapsody (1957)
- Piano concertos (1956)
- 12 Scandinavian Dances for orchestra (1958)
- Saxophone concerto (1958) dedicated to Sigurd Raschèr
- Concerto Lirico for string orchestra (1961)
- Impulsi for orchestra (1964)
- Guitar Concerto

=== Chamber music ===
- Six string quartets
- Violin Sonatas (1965), (1975)
- Partita Amabile and other works for guitar
- Larghetto for viola (or cello) and piano (1937, rev 1966)
- Lyrisk episod (Lyrical Episode) for viola and piano, Op. 29 (1944)

=== Vocal ===
- Songs
