= List of Swedish films of the 1920s =

This is a list of films produced in Sweden and in the Swedish language in the 1920s.

== 1920 ==
English Title	Director	Cast	Genre	Swedish Title	Notes
1920
Bodakungen	Gustaf Molander	Egil Eide, Winifred Westover, August Palme, Wanda Rothgardt	Drama	Bodakungen	
Erotikon	Mauritz Stiller	Anders de Wahl, Tora Teje	Comedy	Erotikon	
How Not to Dress	Ragnar Ring	Olga Andersson, Erick Fröander, Greta Garbo, Ragnar Widestedt		Herr och fru Stockholm	
Karin, Daughter of Ingmar	Victor Sjöström	Nils Aréhn, Josua Bengtson, Bror Berger	Drama	Karin Ingmarsdotter	
A Lover in Pawn	Victor Sjostrom	Victor Sjostrom, Concordia Selander	Drama	Mästerman	
The Monastery of Sendomir	Victor Sjöström	Tore Svennberg, Tora Teje, Richard Lund	Drama	Klostret i Sendomir	
The Parson's Widow	Carl Theodor Dreyer	Einar Rød, Hildur Carlberg, Greta Almroth	Comedy, drama	Prästänkan	
Thora van Deken	John W. Brunius	Pauline Brunius, Hugo Björne, Gösta Ekman	Drama	Thora van Deken	

== 1921 ==
English Title	Director	Cast	Genre	Swedish Title	Notes
1921
A Fortune Hunter	John W. Brunius	Gösta Ekman, Mary Johnson, Axel Ringvall	Historical	En lyckoriddare	
Johan	Mauritz Stiller	Mathias Taube, Jenny Hasselquist, Urho Somersalmi	Drama	Johan	
The Mill	John W. Brunius	Anders de Wahl, Emmy Albiin, Gösta Cederlund	Drama	Kvarnen	
The Phantom Carriage	Victor Sjöström	Victor Sjöström, Hilda Borgström, Astrid Holm	Horror	Körkarlen	
A Wild Bird	John W. Brunius	Tore Svennberg, Pauline Brunius, Renée Björling	Drama	En vildfågel	

== 1922 ==
English Title	Director	Cast	Genre	Swedish Title	Notes
1922
Andersson's Kalle	Sigurd Wallén	Gösta Alexandersson, Dagmar Ebbesen, Stina Berg	Comedy	Anderssonskans Kalle	
The Eyes of Love	John W. Brunius	Gösta Ekman, Pauline Brunius, Vilhelm Bryde	Drama	Kärlekens ögon	
Thomas Graal's Ward	Gustaf Molander	Einar Axelsson, Vera Schmiterlöw, Nils Aréhn	Drama	Thomas Graals myndling	
Witchcraft Through The Ages	Benjamin Christensen	Clara Pontoppidan, Oscar Stribolt, Astrid Holm	Horror, pseudo-documentary	Häxan	

== 1923 ==
English Title	Director	Cast	Genre	Swedish Title	Notes
1923
Anna-Clara and Her Brothers	Per Lindberg	Carl Browallius, Hilda Borgström, Linnéa Hillberg	Drama	Anna-Clara och hennes bröder	
Boman at the Exhibition	Karin Swanström	Georg Blomstedt, Wiktor Andersson, Ingeborg Strandin	Comedy	Boman på utställningen	
Carousel	Dimitri Buchowetzki	Walter Janssen, Aud Egede-Nissen, Alfons Fryland	Drama	Karusellen	
House Slaves	Ragnar Widestedt	Dagmar Ebbesen, Agda Helin, Karin Swanström	Comedy	Hemslavinnor	
Iron Wills	John W. Brunius	Eugen Skjønberg, Linnéa Hillberg, Torsten Hillberg	Drama	Hårda viljor	
Johan Ulfstjerna	John W. Brunius	Ivan Hedqvist, Anna Olin, Mary Johnson	Drama	Johan Ulfstjerna	
New Pranks of Andersson's Kalle	Sigurd Wallén	Gösta Alexandersson, Dagmar Ebbesen, Edvin Adolphson	Comedy	Anderssonskans Kalle på nya upptåg	
The Suitor from the Highway	Sigurd Wallén	Edvin Adolphson, Jenny Hasselqvist, Gösta Alexandersson	Drama	Friaren från landsvägen	
The Story of Gunnar Hede	Mauritz Stiller	Einar Hanson, Mary Johnson, Pauline Brunius	Drama	Gunnar Hedes saga	

== 1924 ==
English Title	Director	Cast	Genre	Swedish Title	Notes
1924
Charles XII's Courier	Rudolf Anthoni	Gösta Ekman, Renée Björling, Nils Asther	Adventure	Carl XII:s kurir	
The Counts at Svansta	Sigurd Wallén	Hugo Björne, Magda Holm, Inga Tidblad	Drama	Grevarna på Svansta	
Life in the Country	Ivan Hedqvist	Axel Ringvall, Mona Mårtenson, Axel Hultman	Drama	Livet på landet	
A Maid Among Maids	John W. Brunius	Magda Holm, Georg Blomstedt, Margit Manstad	Comedy	En piga bland pigor	
The People of Simlang Valley	Theodor Berthels	Mathias Taube, Greta Almroth, Paul Seelig	Drama	Folket i Simlångsdalen	
The Saga of Gosta Berling	Mauritz Stiller	Greta Garbo, Lars Hanson, Gerda Lundequist	Drama, romance	Gösta Berlings saga	
Where the Lighthouse Flashes	Ivar Kåge	Gösta Hillberg, Ester Julin, Edvin Adolphson	Drama	Där fyren blinkar	

== 1925 ==
English Title	Director	Cast	Genre	Swedish Title	Notes
1925
40 Skipper Street	Gustaf Edgren	Einar Hanson, Mona Mårtenson, Magda Holm	Drama	Skeppargatan 40	
Charles XII	John W. Brunius	Gösta Ekman, Bengt Djurberg, Augusta Lindberg	Historical	Karl XII	2 Parts
First Mate Karlsson's Sweethearts	Gustaf Edgren	Ernst Rolf, Vera Schmiterlöw, Fridolf Rhudin	Comedy	Styrman Karlssons flammor	
The Flying Dutchman	Karin Swanström	Anders de Wahl, Werner Fuetterer, Torsten Hillberg	Drama	Flygande holländaren	
Her Little Majesty	Sigurd Wallén	Margita Alfvén, Gunnar Tolnæs, Stina Berg	Comedy	Hennes lilla majestät	
Ingmar's Inheritance	Gustaf Molander	Lars Hanson, Conrad Veidt, John Ekman	Drama	Ingmarsarvet	
Kalle Utter	Karin Swanström	Anders de Wahl, Georg Blomstedt, John Ekman	Drama	Kalle Utter	
The Lady of the Camellias	Olof Molander	Tora Teje, Uno Henning, Nils Aréhn	Drama	Damen med kameliorna	
The Österman Brothers' Virago	William Larsson	Frida Sporrong, Georg Blomstedt, Nils Lundell	Comedy	Bröderna Östermans huskors	

== 1926 ==
English Title	Director	Cast	Genre	Swedish Title	Notes
1926
Charley's Aunt	Elis Ellis	Ralph Forbes, Renée Björling, Olav Riégo	Comedy	Charleys tant	
Getting Married	Olof Molander	Olof Winnerstrand, Tora Teje, Hilda Borgström	Drama	Giftas	
The Million Dollars	Sigurd Wallén	Margita Alfvén, Richard Lund, Axel Hultman	Comedy	Dollarmillionen	
The Girl in Tails	Karin Swanström	Einar Axelsson, Nils Aréhn, Georg Blomstedt	Drama	Flickan i Frack	
Only a Dancing Girl	Olof Molander	Lil Dagover, Walter Janssen, Harry Halm	Drama	Bara en danserska	Co-production with Germany
The Rivals	Gustaf Edgren	Vera Schmiterlöw, Nils Ohlin, Fridolf Rhudin	Comedy	Hon, han och Andersson	
She Is the Only One	Gustaf Molander	Alphons Fryland, Vera Voronina, Ivan Hedqvist	Drama	Hon, den enda	
A Sister of Six	Ragnar Hyltén-Cavallius	Willy Fritsch, Betty Balfour, Lydia Potechina	Comedy	Flickorna Gyurkovics	Co-production with Germany and UK
The Tales of Ensign Stål	John W. Brunius	John Ericsson, Edvin Adolphson, Olga Andersson	Historical	Fänrik Ståls sägner	
To the Orient	Gustaf Molander	Lars Hanson, Jenny Hasselqvist, Mona Mårtenson	Drama	Till österland	
Uncle Frans	Sigurd Wallén	Ivan Hedqvist, Inga Tidblad, Richard Lund	Drama	Farbror Frans	

== 1927 ==
English Title	Director	Cast	Genre	Swedish Title	Notes
1927
The Devil and the Smalander	Erik A. Petschler	Thor Modéen, Jenny Tschernichin-Larsson, Emmy Albiin	Drama	Hin och smålänningen	
The Ghost Baron	Gustaf Edgren	Fridolf Rhudin, Karin Swanström, Enrique Rivero	Drama	Spökbaronen	
His English Wife	Gustaf Molander	Lil Dagover, Gösta Ekman, Karin Swanström	Drama	Hans engelska fru	Co-production with Germany
A Perfect Gentleman	Vilhelm Bryde, Gösta Ekman	Gösta Ekman, Karin Swanström, Hans Albers	Drama, comedy	En perfekt gentleman	
The Queen of Pellagonia	Sigurd Wallén	Vera Schmiterlöw, Stina Berg, Gustaf Lövås	Comedy	Drottningen av Pellagonien	
Sealed Lips	Gustaf Molander	Mona Mårtenson, Fred Louis Lerch, Sandra Milovanoff	Drama	Förseglade läppar	

== 1928 ==
English Title	Director	Cast	Genre	Swedish Title	Notes
1928
Black Rudolf	Gustaf Edgren	Fridolf Rhudin, Inga Tidblad, John Ekman	Drama	Svarte Rudolf	
Gustaf Wasa	John W. Brunius	Gösta Ekman, Edvin Adolphson, John Ericsson	Historical	Gustaf Wasa	
Jansson's Temptation	Sigurd Wallén	Oscar Byström, Margita Alfvén, Edvin Adolphson	Comedy	Janssons frestelse	
Parisiennes	Gustaf Molander	Margit Manstad, Ruth Weyher, Miles Mander	Drama	Parisiskor	Co-production with Germany
The Poetry of Ådalen	Theodor Berthels	Mathias Taube, Hilda Borgström, Jessie Wessel	Drama	Ådalens poesi	
Sin	Gustaf Molander	Lars Hanson, Elissa Landi, Gina Manès	Drama	Synd	Co-production with Germany and UK

== 1929 ==
English Title	Director	Cast	Genre	Swedish Title	Notes
1929
Artificial Svensson	Gustaf Edgren	Fridolf Rhudin, Brita Appelgren, Weyler Hildebrand	Comedy	Konstgjorda Svensson	
The Realm of the Rye	Ivar Johansson	Mathias Taube, Margit Manstad, Eric Laurent	Drama	Rågens rike	
Say It with Music	Edvin Adolphson	Håkan Westergren, Elisabeth Frisk, Stina Berg	Musical	Säg det i toner	
The Strongest	Axel Lindblom, Alf Sjöberg	Bengt Djurberg, Anders Henrikson, Gösta Gustafson	Drama	Den starkaste	
The Triumph of the Heart	Gustaf Molander	Carl Brisson, Lissy Arna, Edvin Adolphson	Drama	Hjärtats triumf	
