= Ferenc Herczeg =

Hungarian playwright and author

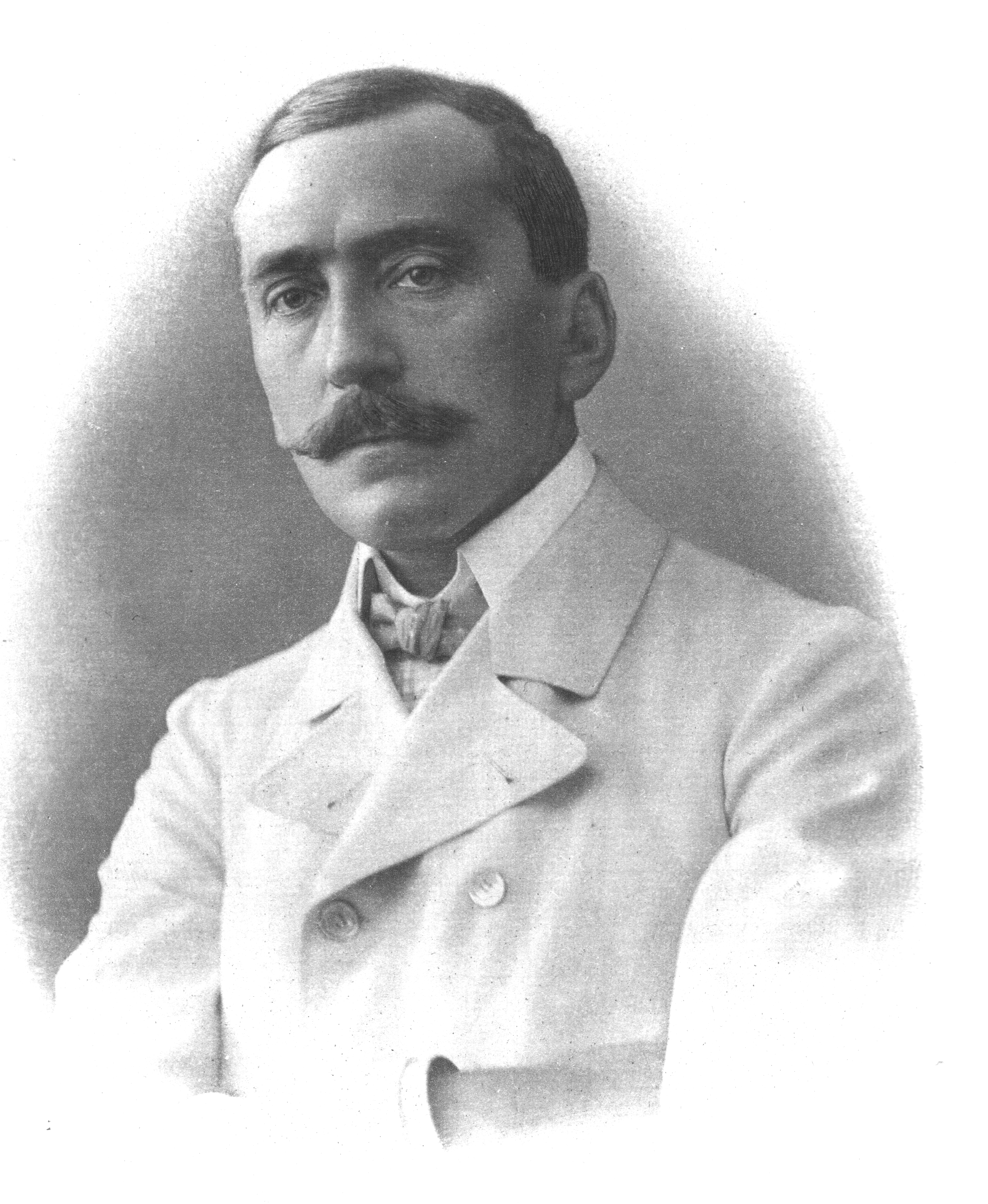
- Ferenc Herczeg
- Born: 22 September 1863; Versecz, Kingdom of Hungary, Austrian Empire (now Vršac, Serbia)
- Died: 24 February 1954 (aged 90); Budapest, Hungary
- Education: University of Budapest (JD)
- Occupations: Writer, playwright, journalist
- Spouse: Janka Grill
- Writing career
- Language: Hungarian
- Notable work: The Gates of Life

Signature
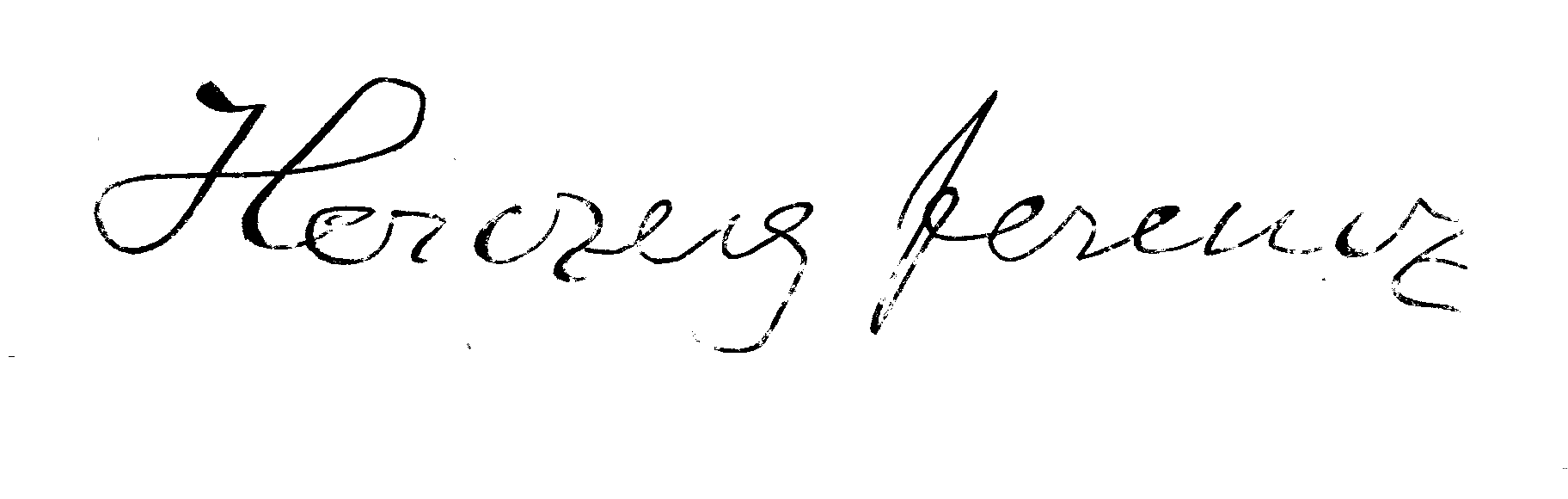

Ferenc Herczeg (born Franz Herzog, 22 September 1863 in Versec, Kingdom of Hungary, Austrian Empire – 24 February 1954 in Budapest, Hungary) was a Hungarian playwright and author who promoted conservative nationalist opinion in his country. He was nominated for the Nobel Prize in Literature three times.

== Career ==
He founded and edited the magazine Új Idők ("New Times") in 1895. In 1896, he was elected to parliament, and in 1901, he became the president of the Petőfi Society.

Dream Country (1912), one of his more prominent novels, tells how the love affair of an American business magnate and a Hungarian adventuress ends in jealousy and murder in the course of a yacht tour from Athens and Istanbul to Venice. In 1925, 1926 and 1927, he was nominated for the Nobel prize for The Gates of Life (1919), a historical novel about archbishop Tamás Bakócz, the only Hungarian aspirant to the papal throne, set in 16th-century Rome.

One major recurring theme of his novels is the conflict of a rich heir with his brother, cousin or rival who has been cheated of his lawful rights (Huszt of Huszt 1906, The Two Lives of Magdalena 1917, Northern Lights 1930).

In 1949, Herczeg sued movie studio MGM, producer Joe Pasternak and screenwriters Walter Reisch and Leo Townsend (author) for $200,000 over the 1942 movie Seven Sweethearts, claiming they had plagiarized his play Seven Sisters, which he had written in 1903 and which Paramount Pictures had adapted into The Seven Sisters a 1915 movie starring Madge Evans.

== Selected bibliography ==
- Above and Below (1890)
- Mutamur (1893)
- The Gyurkovics Girls (1893)
- The Daughter of the Landlord of Dolova (1893)
- The Gyurkovics Boys (1895)
- The House of Honthy (a drama, 1896)
- The First Storm (a drama, 1899)
- Hand Washes Hand (a drama, 1903)
- The Gates of Life (a novel, 1919)

== Film adaptations ==
- The Seven Sisters, 1915, United States, directed by Sidney Olcott
- A dolovai nábob leánya, 1916, Austria-Hungary, directed by Jenő Janovics and Alexander Korda
- The Colonel (Az ezredes), 1917, Austria-Hungary, directed by Michael Curtiz
- Erotikon, 1920, Sweden, directed by Mauritz Stiller
- Gyurkovicsarna, 1920, Sweden, directed by John W. Brunius
- A Sister of Six, 1926, Sweden and Germany, directed by Ragnar Hyltén-Cavallius
- The Rakoczi March (Rákóczi induló), 1933, Austria and Hungary, directed by Steve Sekely
- Sensation, 1936, Hungary, directed by Steve Sekely and Ladislao Vajda
- Pogányok, 1937, Hungary, directed by Emil Martonffy
- The Blue Fox (Der Blaufuchs), 1938, Germany, directed by Viktor Tourjansky
- The Gyurkovics Boys, 1941, Hungary, directed by D. Ákos Hamza
- L'ultimo ballo, 1941, Italy, directed by Camillo Mastrocinque
- Seven Sweethearts, 1942, United States, directed by Frank Borzage
- Szíriusz, 1942, Hungary, directed by D. Ákos Hamza
- The Marsh Flower, 1943, Hungary, directed by D. Ákos Hamza
