= Johan Ulfstjerna =

Johan Ulfstjerna may refer to:

- Johan Ulfstjerna, a 1907 play by Tor Hedberg
- Johan Ulfstjerna (1923 film), a silent Swedish film adaptation directed by John W. Brunius
- Johan Ulfstjerna (1936 film), a Swedish film adaptation directed by Gustaf Edgren
