= Torsten Hillberg =

Swedish actor

- Born: 28 June 1892; Gothenburg, Sweden
- Died: 28 August 1954 (aged 62); Stockholm, Sweden
- Occupation: Actor
- Years active: 1920-1953 (film)

Torsten Hillberg (28 June 1892 – 28 August 1954) was a Swedish stage and film actor. He played character parts in over sixty films from the silent era to the 1950s. He was married to the actress Linnéa Hillberg.

== Biography ==
Hillberg made his stage debut in Gothenburg in 1911. He later worked alternately in Gothenburg and Stockholm, as well as at Swedish theatres in Finland. He made his film debut in 1920 and appeared in more than 50 films, mostly in minor roles.

In 1919, he married actress Linnéa Nilsson (1890–1977). He died from liver cirrhosis at S:t Erik's Hospital. The couple is buried at Örgryte Old Cemetery.

Torsten Hillberg was the brother of actor Olof Hillberg (1887–1968).

== Selected filmography ==
- A Lover in Pawn (1920)
- Johan Ulfstjerna (1923)
- Iron Wills (1923)
- The Ghost of Bragehus (1936)
- John Ericsson, Victor of Hampton Roads (1937)
- Witches' Night (1937)
- Career (1938)
- Whalers (1939)
- We at Solglantan (1939)
- The Two of Us (1939)
- They Staked Their Lives (1940)
- A Real Man (1940)
- Heroes in Yellow and Blue (1940)
- The Three of Us (1940)
- Poor Ferdinand (1941)
- Dangerous Ways (1942)
- Ombyte av tåg (1943)
- In Darkest Smaland (1943)
- There's a Fire Burning (1943)
- Little Napoleon (1943)
- Katrina (1943)
- A Girl for Me (1943)
- Blizzard (1944)
- The People of Hemsö (1944)
- His Excellency (1944)
- Man's Woman (1945)
- The Bells of the Old Town (1946)
- Two Women (1947)

== Bibliography ==
- Steene, Birgitta. Ingmar Bergman: A Guide to References and Resources. Amsterdam University Press, 2005. G.K. Hall, 1987
