= Eyes of Love =

Eyes of Love may refer to:

- Eyes of Love (1951 film), a West German drama film
- Eyes of Love (1959 film), a French-Italian romantic drama film
- The Eyes of Love, a 1922 Swedish silent drama film
