= A Gyurkovics-lányok =

1893 novel by Ferenc Herczeg

- Title page for A Gyurkovics-lányok (1910)
- Author: Ferenc Herczeg
- Language: Hungarian
- Publisher: Singer és Wolfner
- Publication date: 1893
- Publication place: Hungary
- Pages: 214

A Gyurkovics-lányok (lit. 'The Gyurkovics Girls') is an 1893 novel by the Hungarian writer Ferenc Herczeg.

In the novel, a Hungarian mother marries off her seven daughters in clever ways. The book explores "the native traditions ... concerning matrimony as the single career open to women, the strict seniority rights to marriage in a family of many daughters, and the code of honor compelling a youth to marry the girl with whom he has been caught in a flirtation".

Herczeg wrote two more novels about the Gyurkovics family. A Gyurkovics-fiuk (lit. 'The Gyurkovics Boys') was published in 1895 and Gyurka és Sándor (lit. 'Gyurka and Sándor') in 1899. A Gyurkovics-lányok was the basis for the 1911 play Seven Sisters written by Edith Ellis, which became successful internationally. The novel and play have been adapted into the films The Seven Sisters (1915), Gyurkovicsarna (1920) and A Sister of Six (1926).
