= The Doctor's Secret (1930 film) =

1930 film

- Directed by: John W. Brunius
- Written by: Per Stille
- Based on: Half an Hour by J. M. Barrie
- Starring: Ivan Hedqvist; Pauline Brunius; Olof Sandborg
- Production company: Les Studios Paramount
- Distributed by: Film AB Paramount
- Release date: 4 November 1930
- Running time: 65 minutes
- Countries: Sweden; United States
- Language: Swedish

The Doctor's Secret (Swedish: Doktorns hemlighet) is a 1930 drama film directed by John W. Brunius and starring Ivan Hedqvist, Olof Sandborg and John's spouse Pauline Brunius. It was produced and distributed by the Swedish subsidiary of Paramount Pictures at the company's Joinville Studios. It was one of a large number of multiple-language versions shot at Joinville during the early years of the sound era. It is a Swedish-language remake of the Hollywood film The Doctor's Secret, based on the play Half an Hour by J.M. Barrie. It is now considered to be a lost film.

== Synopsis ==
Lillian Gardner is unhappily married to a wealthy businessman. She meets another man and falls in love, planning to elope with him, but he is killed in a car accident.

== Cast ==
- Ivan Hedqvist as Doctor Bolton
- Pauline Brunius as Lady Lillian Gardner
- Olof Sandborg as Richard Gardner
- Hugo Björne as Hugo Paton
- Erik Berglund as Mr. Redding
- Märta Ekström as Mrs. Redding
- Anne-Marie Brunius as Annie
- Ragna Broo-Juter as Mary

== Bibliography ==
- Goble, Alan. The Complete Index to Literary Sources in Film. Walter de Gruyter, 1999.
- Sadoul, Georges. Dictionary of Film Makers. University of California Press, 1972.
