= Charley's Aunt (1926 film) =

1926 film

- Directed by: Elis Ellis
- Written by: Sam Ask; Elis Ellis; Brandon Thomas (play)
- Starring: Elis Ellis; Ralph Forbes; Renée Björling
- Cinematography: Sven Bardach; Axel Lindblom
- Production company: Svensk Filmindustri
- Distributed by: Skandinavisk Filmcentral
- Release date: 22 March 1926
- Country: Sweden
- Languages: Silent; Swedish intertitles

Charley's Aunt (Swedish: Charleys tant) is a 1926 Swedish silent comedy film directed by Elis Ellis and starring Ellis, Ralph Forbes and Renée Björling. It is an adaptation of the 1882 play Charley's Aunt by Brandon Thomas.

The film's sets were designed by the art director Vilhelm Bryde.

== Cast ==
- Elis Ellis as Lord Francourt Bobberley
- Ralph Forbes as Jack Chesney
- Olav Riégo as Charles Wykeham
- Renée Björling as Kitty Werden
- Inga Sundblad-Ellis as Annie Speetigue
- Axel Hultman as Jeremias Speetigue
- Sven Bergvall as Sir Francis Chesney
- Magda Holm as Ella Delahay
- Anna Bergvall as Dona Lucia d'Alvadorez
- Gustaf Hjärne as Brasset

== Bibliography ==
- Tommy Gustafsson. Masculinity in the Golden Age of Swedish Cinema: A Cultural Analysis of 1920s Films. McFarland, 2014.
