= The Girl in Tails (1926 film) =

1926 Swedish silent film

- Directed by: Karin Swanström
- Written by: Hjalmar Bergman; Ivar Johansson
- Based on: Flickan i frack by Hjalmar Bergman
- Produced by: Lars Björck
- Starring: Einar Axelsson; Magda Holm; Nils Aréhn
- Cinematography: Ragnar Westfelt
- Edited by: Ivar Johansson
- Production company: Biografernas Filmdepot
- Release date: 6 September 1926
- Running time: 114 minutes
- Country: Sweden
- Languages: Silent; Swedish intertitles

The Girl in Tails (Swedish: Flickan i frack) is a 1926 Swedish silent comedy drama film directed by Karin Swanström, one of Sweden's first female directors at the time. It stars Einar Axelsson, Magda Holm and Nils Aréhn. It was based on the 1925 novel Flickan i frack by Hjalmar Bergman.

== Synopsis ==
The story is set in Wadkoping around the celebration of a high school graduation. Katja is upset with the way she is treated as a girl; she likens it to second-class treatment. So she decides to attend a graduation ceremony in her brother's tuxedo.

Delighted with her new persona, Katja doesn't mince words, and takes on freedoms that are usually associated with masculinity. She smokes a cigar, drinks some liquor and even dances with a girl at the graduation ball.

She soon discovers that her family and neighbors disapprove of her cross-dressing stunt, which results in her being shunned, so she takes refuge in a tranquil commune reserved for intellectual women.

== Cast ==
- Einar Axelsson as Count Ludwig von Battwhyl
- Magda Holm as Katja Kock
- Nils Aréhn as Old Karl Axel Kock
- Georg Blomstedt as Rector Starck
- Karin Swanström as Widow Hyltenius
- Kar de Mumma as Curry Kock
- Carina May as Eva Björck
- Lotten Olsson as Lizzy Willman
- Anna-Lisa Baude as Lotten Brenner
- Gösta Gustafson as Björner
- Kurt Welin as Bassist at Kupan
- Edla Rothgardt as A Harp
- Julia Cæsar as Statarhustru

== Reception ==
Imogen Smith from Sight and Sound wrote "with its easygoing humor and lovely bucolic setting, the film ends up on the side of resolution and social harmony, but it is the heroine's one, elated night of rule-breaking that makes it memorable." Margareta Horiba of the Scandinavian Review said "the story pits old against young, pride against modesty, tradition against new ideas, all wrapped in humor tinged with melancholy; the setting is Swedish to the core: small town and verdant countryside, warm summer and white nights."

Critic Margarita Landazuri commented that "Bergman adapted his novel for the film; perhaps reflecting its literary source, the movie is more dependent than most silent films on intertitles to deliver some of its zingers, such as referring to a group of female relatives living at a country estate as 'a wild herd of learned women'; there is also plenty of physical comedy in the satire of small-town life, which makes some serious feminist points in the guise of a lighthearted comedy." Author Lokke Heiss noted that the film "manages the trick of being a light breezy comedy while delivering a heartfelt message about woman's rights."

Film critic Danny Fortune opined that "Swanström's social satire tackles gender roles and societal sanctimoniousness." He goes on to observe that "the concept of how much people used to care about what high society thought of them serves as a striking contrast to today’s culture; another plus is the movie's comedic subtlety. Its humor comes out in the witty dialogue, instead of – as was often the case in silent comedies – physical slapstick." He also praised the film's "sharp and beautifully framed scenic cinematography and the film's musical accompaniment."

== See also ==
- Cinema of Sweden
- Cross-gender acting
- List of Swedish films of the 1920s
- List of LGBTQ-related films of the 1920s
