= Pauline Brunius =

Swedish actress and director (1881–1954)

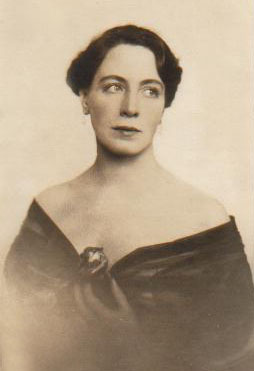
- Born: Emma Maria Pauline Lindstedt; 10 February 1881; Stockholm, Sweden
- Died: 30 March 1954 (aged 73); Stockholm, Sweden
- Occupation: Actress
- Years active: 1901–1934
- Spouse: John W. Brunius (m. 1909–1935)
- Children: Palle Brunius; Anne-Marie Brunius

Pauline Brunius, née Emma Maria Pauline Lindstedt (10 February 1881 in Stockholm – 30 March 1954 in Stockholm) was a Swedish stage and film actor, screenwriter and film and theatre director. She was the managing director of the Royal Dramatic Theatre from 1938 to 1948.

== Biography ==
Born in 1881, Brunius trained at the Operans Balettelevskola before beginning her acting career. She made her professional debut in 1902, under her maiden name, at Olympiateatern in the operetta Primadonnan. Jointly with her spouse (John W. Brunius) and colleague, Gösta Ekman (senior), she was the managing director of the theatre Oscarsteatern in 1926–1932.

In 1938, she was appointed the new managing director of the Royal Dramatic Theatre. As a theater manager, she was known for her determination in the male-dominated entertainment industry. As director of the Oscar Theater, she managed to negotiate financial support from Ivar Kreuger, among others. As director of the Royal Dramatic Theatre, she was criticized for a number of play choices during the Second World War and for a guest performance in Berlin in 1941. However, she was also praised for her strong investment in Riksteatern and for taking the initiative to build a second stage, Lilla scenen, to increase the competitiveness and capacity of the national stage. She resigned as director of Dramaten in 1948 due to illness.

She was married from 1909 to 1935 with actor John W. Brunius and was the mother of actress Anne-Marie Brunius and actor Palle Brunius.

She died on 30 March 1954 at her home in Stockholm after a long illness. Her funeral service was held on 9 April at Hedvig Eleonora Church, presided over by Bishop Manfred Björkquist. She was buried at Galärvarvskyrkogården.

== Selected filmography ==
- Thora van Deken (1920)
- Gyurkovicsarna (1920)
- A Wild Bird (1921)
- The Eyes of Love (1922)
- The Blizzard (1923)
- Charles XII (1925)
- Gustaf Wasa (1928)
- The Doctor's Secret (1930)
- Charlotte Löwensköld (1930)
- False Greta (1934)
