= Anne-Marie Brunius =

Swedish actress

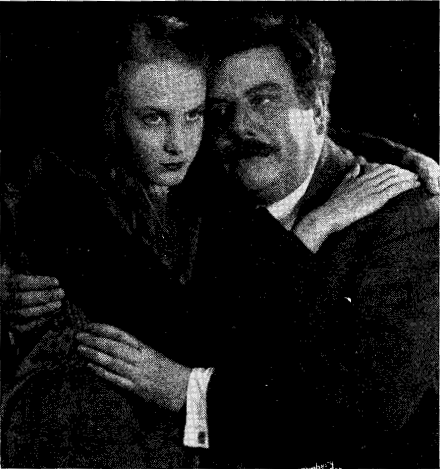
- Anne-Marie Brunius and John Brunius
- Born: 24 September 1916; Stockholm, Sweden
- Died: 10 November 2002 (aged 86); Åkersberga, Sweden
- Years active: 1924–1956

Anne-Marie Pauline Brunius (24 September 1916 – 10 November 2002) was a Swedish film actress. She was born in Stockholm, and died in Åkersberga, Sweden.

She was the daughter of actors and theatre directors John W. Brunius and Pauline Brunius and the sister of theatre director Palle Brunius.

== Selected filmography ==
- Herr Vinners stenåldersdröm (1924)
- Karl XII del II (1925)
- The Doctor's Secret (1930)
- The Two of Us (1930)
- Servant's Entrance (1932)
- Farmors revolution (1933)
- Djurgårdsnätter (1933)
- Fired (1934)
- Unga hjärtan (1934)
- Ungdom av idag (1935)
- Adventure in Pyjamas (1935)
- The Wedding Trip (1936)
- Girl with Hyacinths (1950)
- The Birds and the Bees (1956)
