= Hugo Edlund =

Swedish cinematographer (1883–1953)

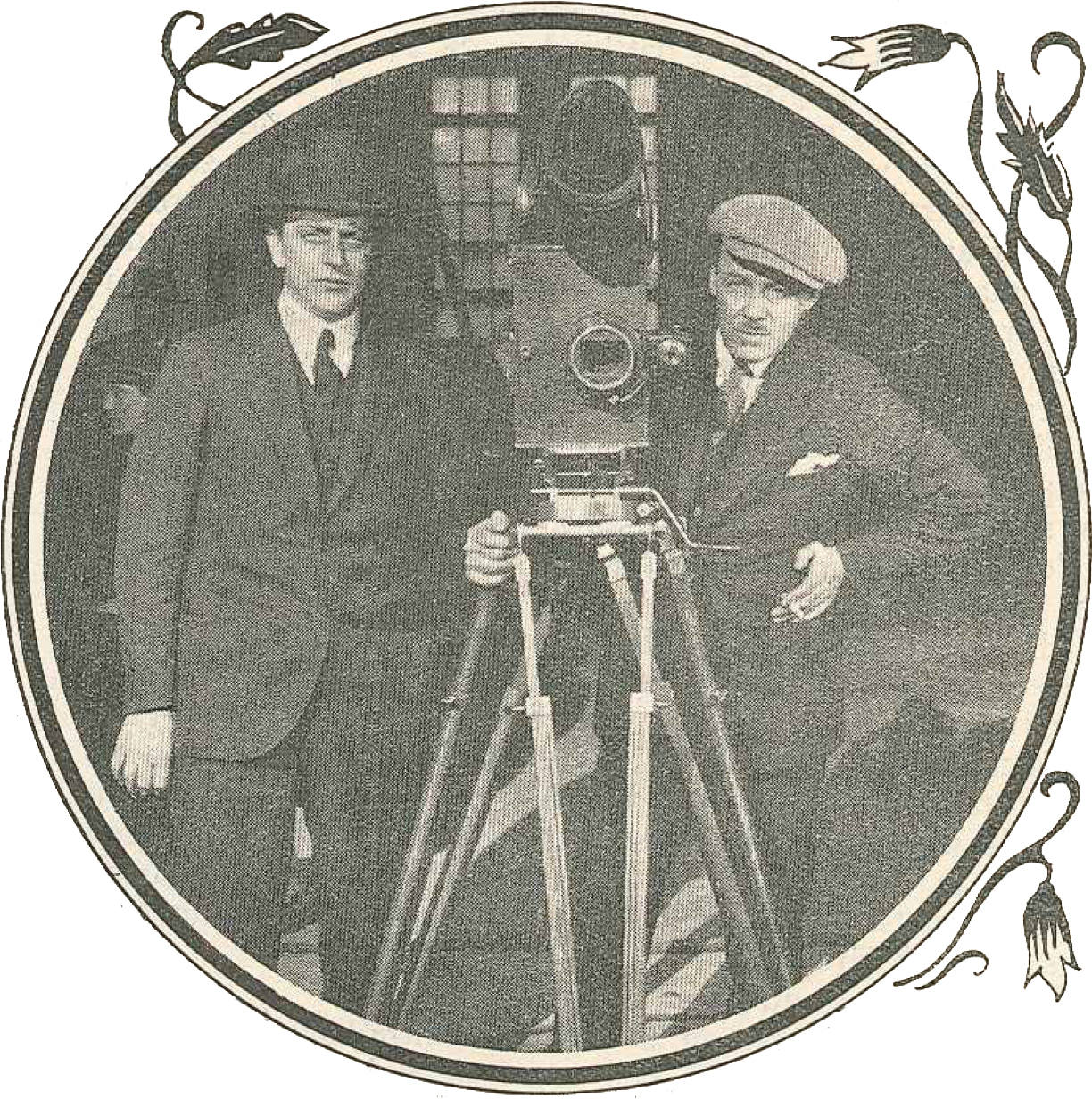
- Edlund (right) with director Gustaf Edgren in 1928
- Born: 28 February 1883; Ljusdal, Sweden
- Died: 9 December 1953 (aged 70); Stockholm, Sweden
- Occupation: Cinematographer
- Years active: 1912-1933 (film)

Hugo Edlund (1883–1953) was a Swedish cinematographer active during the silent and early sound eras. He worked frequently with the film director John W. Brunius.

== Selected filmography ==
- Thora van Deken (1920)
- The Mill (1921)
- A Wild Bird (1921)
- A Fortune Hunter (1921)
- The Eyes of Love (1922)
- Iron Wills (1923)
- Johan Ulfstjerna (1923)
- A Maid Among Maids (1924)
- Charles XII (1925)
- The Tales of Ensign Stål (1926)
- Only a Dancing Girl (1926)
- Gustaf Wasa (1928)
- Artificial Svensson (1929)
- Cavaliers of the Crown (1930)
- Kärlek och landstorm (1931)
- Colourful Pages (1931)
- His Life's Match (1932)
- Love and Dynamite (1933)

== Bibliography ==
- Klossner, Michael. The Europe of 1500-1815 on Film and Television: A Worldwide Filmography of Over 2550 Works, 1895 Through 2000. McFarland & Company, 2002.
- Sadoul, Georges. Dictionary of Film Makers. University of California Press, 1972.
