= The Two of Us (1930 film) =

1930 film

- Directed by: John W. Brunius
- Written by: Per Stille; Elsa af Trolle
- Based on: The Lady Lies by John Meehan
- Starring: Edvin Adolphson; Margit Manstad; Erik Berglund
- Production company: Les Studios Paramount
- Distributed by: Film AB Paramount
- Release date: 18 September 1930
- Running time: 96 minutes
- Countries: Sweden; United States
- Language: Swedish

The Two of Us (Swedish: Vi två) is a 1930 drama film directed by John W. Brunius and starring Edvin Adolphson, Margit Manstad and Erik Berglund. It was produced and distributed by the Swedish subsidiary of Paramount Pictures at the company's Joinville Studios. It was one of a large number of multiple-language versions shot at Joinville during the early years of the sound era. It is a Swedish-language remake of the 1929 Hollywood film The Lady Lies.

This was Anna-Lisa Fröberg's film debut.

== Synopsis ==
A New York widower shocks his two grown-up children when he takes up with a shop assistant in a fashion store, and they seek to break up the developing relationship.

== Cast ==
- Edvin Adolphson as Robert Rossiter
- Margit Manstad as Joyce Roamer
- Erik Berglund as Charles Tyler
- Märta Ekström as Miriam Pearson
- Ivan Hedqvist as Henry Tuttle
- Anne-Marie Brunius as Josephine Rossiter
- Ragnar Falck as Bob Rossiter
- Anna-Lisa Fröberg as Amelia Tuttle, Henry Tuttles fru
- Britta Vieweg as Ann Gardner
- Elsa de Castro as Första expediten på Yvonne Modes

== Bibliography ==
- Goble, Alan. The Complete Index to Literary Sources in Film. Walter de Gruyter, 1999.
- Sadoul, Georges. Dictionary of Film Makers. University of California Press, 1972.
