= Fired (1934 film) =

1934 film

- Directed by: Ivar Johansson
- Written by: Sven Nygren
- Produced by: Harry Malmstedt
- Starring: Sture Lagerwall; Anne-Marie Brunius; Mathias Taube
- Cinematography: Martin Bodin
- Edited by: Rolf Husberg
- Music by: Eric Bengtson; Georg Enders
- Production company: Film AB Imago
- Distributed by: Fribergs Filmbyrå
- Release date: 19 March 1934
- Running time: 96 minutes
- Country: Sweden
- Language: Swedish

Fired (Swedish: Uppsagd) is a 1934 Swedish drama film directed by Ivar Johansson and starring Sture Lagerwall, Anne-Marie Brunius and Mathias Taube. It was shot at the Råsunda Studios in Stockholm. The film's sets were designed by the art director Arne Åkermark. In a meta-commentary, Kraft takes a short job as an extra at the Råsunda Studios, taking direction by Johansson.

== Synopsis ==
An office clerk loses his job when his company acquires a new machine that can do his work much faster than he can.

== Cast ==
- Sture Lagerwall as Björn Kraft
- Anne-Marie Brunius as Maud Hage
- Mathias Taube as Hage
- Georg Rydeberg as Bugge
- Eva Turitz as Eva
- Anna Olin as Mrs. Lundbom
- Nils Lundell as Anders Gottfrid Karlsson
- Thor Modéen as The supervisor
- Margit Andelius as Secretary
- Wiktor Andersson as Hen-pecked husband
- Gunnar Björnstrand as Kirre Skoglund
- Tor Borong as Office Director
- Eivor Engelbrektsson as Maid Elin
- Knut Frankman as Svensson
- Olle Hilding as Aron Jacobsky
- Lilly Kjellström as Amalia
- Gösta Lycke as Insurance Director
- John Melin as Administrator
- Yngve Nyqvist as Office Director
- Charley Paterson as Office Supplies Director

== Bibliography ==
- Qvist, Per Olov & von Bagh, Peter. Guide to the Cinema of Sweden and Finland. Greenwood Publishing Group, 2000.
