= A Wild Bird =

1921 film

- Directed by: John W. Brunius
- Written by: Samuel A. Duse (play); Sam Ask; John W. Brunius
- Starring: Tore Svennberg; Pauline Brunius; Paul Seelig
- Cinematography: Hugo Edlund
- Production company: Svensk Filmindustri
- Distributed by: Svensk Filmindustri
- Release date: 3 October 1921
- Running time: 89 minutes
- Country: Sweden
- Languages: Silent; Swedish intertitles

A Wild Bird or Her Adopted Son (Swedish: En vildfågel) is a 1921 Swedish silent drama film directed by John W. Brunius and starring Tore Svennberg, Pauline Brunius and Paul Seelig. It was shot at the Filmstaden situated in Råsunda, in Stockholm. The film's sets were designed by the art directors Vilhelm Bryde and Axel Esbensen.

== Cast ==
- Tore Svennberg as Richard Brenner
- Pauline Brunius as Bertha Brenner
- Paul Seelig as Paul Hennings
- Renée Björling as Alice Brenner
- Jenny Tschernichin-Larsson as Old Hanna
- Nils Lundell as Old Man
- Bror Berger as First Mate
- Edvin Adolphson as Guest
- Gösta Cederlund as Guest
- Arthur Natorp as Guest
- Gull Natorp as Guest

== Bibliography ==
- Sadoul, Georges. Dictionary of Film Makers. University of California Press, 1972.
