= Hugo Björne =

Swedish actor

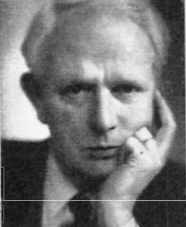
- Born: 4 February 1886
- Died: 14 February 1966 (aged 80)
- Occupation: Actor
- Children: Lars Björne

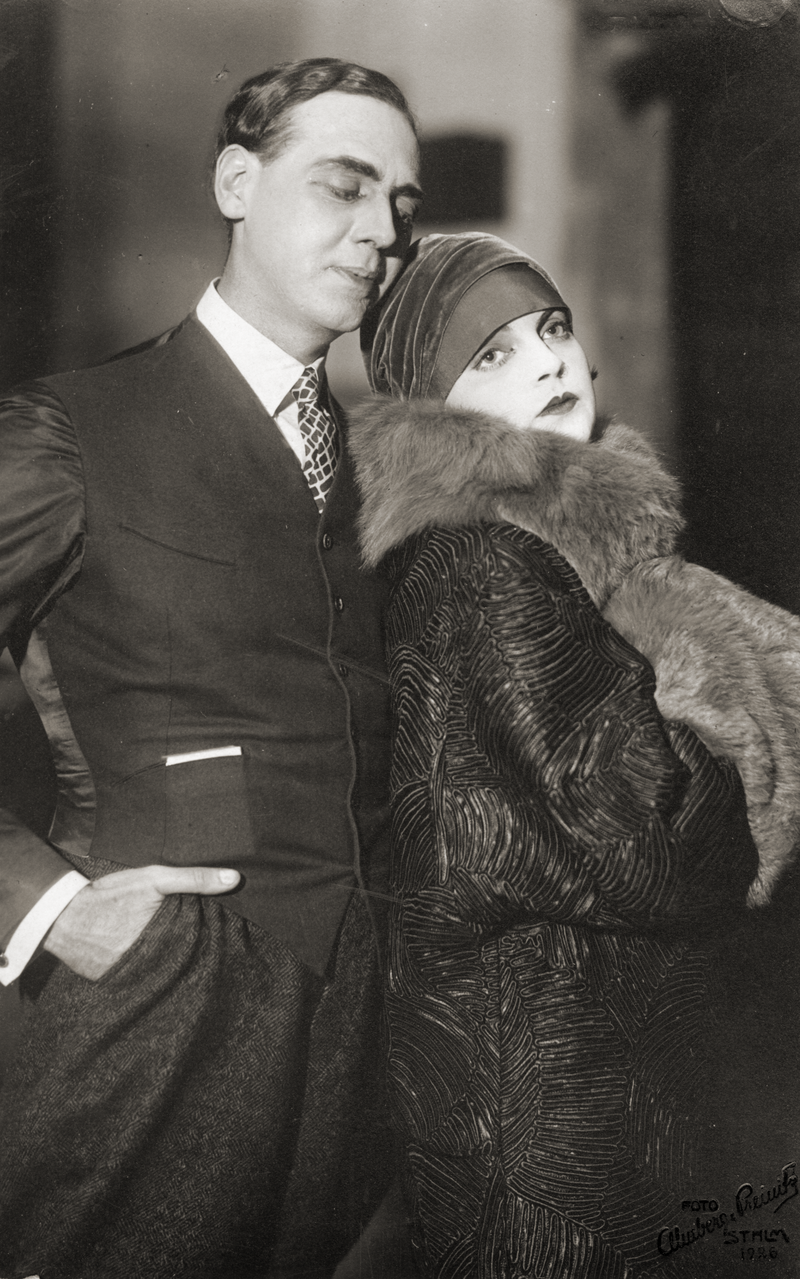
Hugo Björne with actress Margit Manstad in the play Dollar at Oscarsteatern in 1926.

Hugo Björne (4 February 1886 – 14 February 1966) was a Swedish film and theater actor.

== Biography ==
Ernst Hugo Alexis Björne was born in Varberg in Halland, Sweden. He made his stage debut in 1907 and belonged to the acting company of Hjalmar Selander until 1911 when he moved to the theater company of Einar Fröberg where he worked until 1914. Björne was involved at Svenska Teatern in Stockholm (1914–1925), at Vasateatern (1925–1926), at Oscarsteatern (1926–1932) and later at Vasateatern under the direction of Gösta Ekman (1932–1936). After 1946, he became committed to the Royal Dramatic Theatre.

He made his film acting debut in 1913, starring in silent movies. Later, Björne would be better known as a supporting actor. He was quite productive, participating in more than 130 films where he often portrayed rather anonymous characters such as judges, professors and doctors.

== Personal life ==
Hugo Björne was married to actress Gerda Lidholm (1891–1979) . He died at Stockholm in 1966 and was buried at S:t Jörgens kyrkogård in Varberg.

== Selected filmography ==
- Laughter and Tears (1913)
- Thora van Deken (1920)
- The Blizzard (1923)
- The Counts at Svansta (1924)
- Ingmar's Inheritance (1925)
- The Tales of Ensign Stål (1926)
- Sin (1928)
- Gustaf Wasa (1928)
- The Doctor's Secret (1930)
- A Night of Love by the Öresund (1931)
- People of Hälsingland (1933)
- Perhaps a Poet (1933)
- The Women Around Larsson (1934)
- The Song to Her (1934)
- Intermezzo (1936)
- The Lady Becomes a Maid (1936)
- The Ghost of Bragehus (1936)
- Johan Ulfstjerna (1936)
- Conscientious Objector Adolf (1936)
- The People of Bergslagen (1937)
- The Andersson Family (1937)
- Mother Gets Married (1937)
- Art for Art's Sake (1938)
- Sun Over Sweden (1938)
- Emilie Högquist (1939)
- Kiss Her! (1940)
- Hanna in Society (1940)
- Tonight or Never (1941)
- Sunny Sunberg (1941)
- Lasse-Maja (1941)
- Lucky Young Lady (1941)
- How to Tame a Real Man (1941)
- Only a Woman (1941)
- The Fight Continues (1941)
- Poor Ferdinand (1941)
- The Heavenly Play (1942)
- Nothing Is Forgotten (1942)
- Ride Tonight! (1942)
- Gentleman with a Briefcase (1943)
- The Sin of Anna Lans (1943)
- Katrina (1943)
- There's a Fire Burning (1943)
- Men of the Navy (1943)
- Young Blood (1943)
- Kungajakt (1944)
- Count Only the Happy Moments (1944)
- The People of Hemsö (1944)
- The Emperor of Portugallia (1944)
- His Excellency (1944)
- The Invisible Wall (1944)
- The Gallows Man (1945)
- The Serious Game (1945)
- Crime and Punishment (1945)
- When the Meadows Blossom (1946)
- The Night Watchman's Wife (1947)
- No Way Back (1947)
- Life Starts Now (1948)
- Lars Hård (1948)
- Sunshine (1948)
- Only a Mother (1949)
- In Lilac Time (1952)
- Defiance (1952)
- Love (1952)
- Hidden in the Fog (1953)
- Barabbas (1953)
- The Glass Mountain (1953)
- The Shadow (1953)
- The Red Horses (1954)
- Sir Arne's Treasure (1954)
- Paradise (1955)
- Det är aldrig för sent (1956)
- A Dreamer's Journey (1957)
- A Goat in the Garden (1958)
- A Lion in Town (1959)
- Heaven and Pancake (1959)
- Crime in Paradise (1959)
- The Judge (1960)
- The Lady in White (1962)
