= Justus Hagman =

Swedish actor (1859–1936)

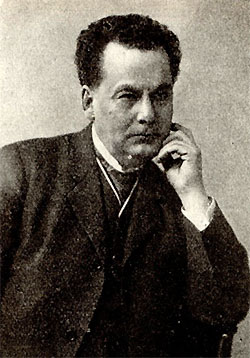
- Born: Carl Justus Hagman; 14 February 1859; Solna Municipality, Sweden
- Died: 28 February 1936 (aged 77); Stockholm, Sweden
- Occupation: Actor
- Years active: 1876–1935

Carl Justus Hagman (14 February 1859 – 28 February 1936) was a Swedish actor. Hagman made his stage debut in 1876 and made his first appearance in a film in 1913 in the Victor Sjöström film Miraklet. He performed in another thirty films until 1935. Between 1882 and 1885 Hagman was an employee of the Swedish Theatre in Helsinki, he also worked at the Storåteatern, Vasateatern and the Albert Ranft Teatern and Södra Teatern.

Among his roles are Trettondagsafton, Don Cesar de Bazano, Fagin in Oliver Twist, gamle Kampe in Det nya systemet, Didrik in Ljungby horn and the character Lutz in Gamla Heidelberg.

Justus Hagman is buried at the Norra begravningsplatsen cemetery in Stockholm. He was buried on 23 May 1946.

== Selected filmography ==
- Laughter and Tears (Löjen och tårar) (1913)
- The Clergyman (Prästen) (1914)
- Synnöve Solbakken (1919)
- The Eyes of Love (1922)
- The Counts at Svansta (1924)
- Ingmar's Inheritance (1925)
- The Lady of the Camellias (1925)
- She Is the Only One (1926)
- Sin (1928)
- Gustaf Wasa (1928)
- Say It with Music (1929)
