= Charles XII's Courier =

1924 film

- Directed by: Rudolf Anthoni
- Written by: Esaias Tegnér (poem); Rudolf Anthoni
- Produced by: Lars Björck
- Starring: Gösta Ekman; Renée Björling; Nils Asther
- Cinematography: Adrian Bjurman
- Production company: Filmindustri AB Triumvir
- Distributed by: Film AB Liberty
- Release date: 28 April 1924
- Running time: 64 minutes
- Country: Sweden
- Languages: Silent; Swedish intertitles

Charles XII's Courier (Swedish: Carl XII:s kurir) is a 1924 Swedish silent historical adventure film directed by Rudolf Anthoni and starring Gösta Ekman, Renée Björling and Nils Asther. It was shot at the Råsunda Studios in Stockholm. The film's sets were designed by the art director Vilhelm Bryde. It is now considered to be a lost film. It should not be confused with the 1925 film Charles XII in which Ekman also starred, appearing in the title role.

== Synopsis ==
Following his defeat at Bender, Charles XII sends one of his officers carrying vital messages to Stockholm across a hostile and dangerous Europe.

== Cast ==
- Gösta Ekman as Axel Roos
- Tottan Skantze as Maria Sobieska
- Renée Björling as Anna Björnhufvud
- Hilda Castegren as Aurora Sobieska
- Victor Lundberg as Alexis Potocki
- Nils Asther as Stanislaus
- Nils Lundell as Man

== See also ==
- Cinema of Sweden
- Lost film

== Bibliography ==
- Gustafsson, Tommy. Masculinity in the Golden Age of Swedish Cinema: A Cultural Analysis of 1920s Films. McFarland, 2014..
