= Kungen kommer =

1936 film

- Directed by: Ragnar Hyltén-Cavallius
- Written by: Rudolf Presber (libretto); Leo Stein (libretto); Hans H. Zerlett (libretto)
- Screenplay by: Ragnar Hyltén-Cavallius
- Based on: Der Gauklerkönig by Jean Gilbert
- Starring: Gösta Ekman; Birgit Tengroth; Åke Ohberg; Tollie Zellman; Håkan Westergren
- Music by: Gunnar Johansson
- Distributed by: AB Svensk Filmindustri
- Release date: 23 March 1936 (Sweden)
- Running time: 81 minutes
- Country: Sweden
- Language: Swedish

Kungen kommer is a 1936 Swedish comedy film directed by Ragnar Hyltén-Cavallius. It starrs Gösta Ekman, Birgit Tengroth, Åke Ohberg, Tollie Zellman and Håkan Westergren.

== Plot ==
It is the year of 1865 and the Löwencreutz family are expecting a very prominent visitor, King Charles XV is coming to stay. However Carl Henrik von Grimm reads a telegram stating that the King is in fact cancelling his visit.

At the theatre that night Grimm notices the actor Leonard Petterson who happens to resemble the king a great deal. This gives Grimm an idea that could work in his favour. Can he hire the actor to play the King and get away with it?

== Cast ==
- Gösta Ekman as Leonard Petterson, actor / King Charles XV
- Nils Wahlbom as Casimir Löwencreutz
- Gull Natorp as Adèle Löwencreutz
- Birgit Tengroth as Marie-Louise Löwencreutz
- Håkan Westergren as Charles-Emile Spaak
- Olga Andersson as Countess Ehrencrona
- Åke Ohberg as Carl Henrik von Grimm
- Semmy Friedmann as Italian pyrotechnist
- Theodor Berthels as theatre manager
- Thor Modéen as Alexander Dryselius
- Maritta Marke as Anette Dryselius
- Tollie Zellman as Sophie Strååk
