= Gyurkovicsarna =

- Directed by: John W. Brunius
- Written by: Ferenc Herczeg (novel); Pauline Brunius; Gösta Ekman
- Starring: Gösta Ekman; Nils Asther; Violet Molitor; Emile Stiebel
- Cinematography: Hugo Edlund
- Production company: Filmindustri AB Skandia
- Distributed by: Filmindustri AB Skandias Filmbyrå (Sweden)
- Release date: 20 September 1920
- Country: Sweden
- Languages: Silent; Swedish intertitles

Gyurkovicsarna is a Swedish 1920 silent comedy film directed by John W. Brunius and starring Gösta Ekman, Nils Asther, Violet Molitor, Emile Stiebel and john's then spouse Pauline Brunius. It was an adaptation of the 1895 novel A Gyurkovics-fiúk (lit. 'The Gyurkovics Boys') by the Hungarian author Ferenc Herczeg.

== Cast ==
- Gösta Ekman as Geza Gyurkovics
- Nils Asther as Bandi Gyurkovics
- Violet Molitor as Jutka Brenoczy
- Emile Stiebel as Colonel Brenoczy
- Pauline Brunius as Baroness Hetvics-Janky
- Gucken Cederborg as Mother Gyurkovics
- Julius Hälsig as Father Gyurkovics
