= Sam Ask =

Swedish screenwriter and actor

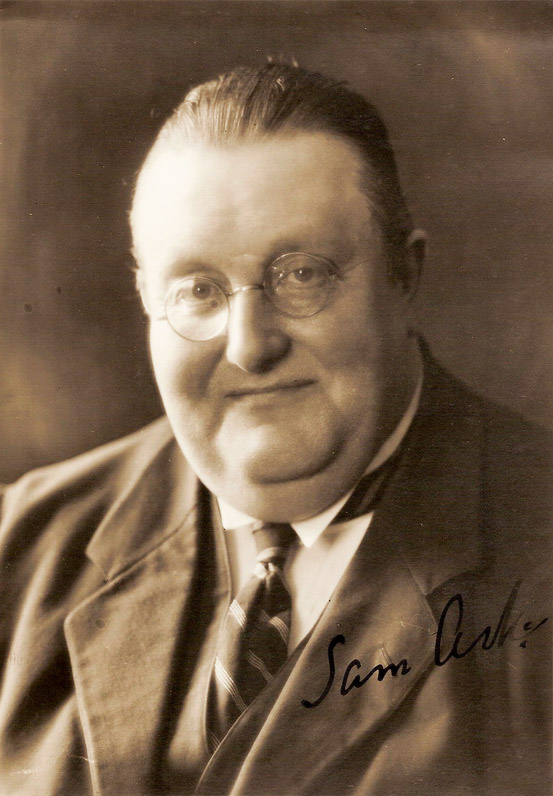
- Born: 16 October 1878; Klippan, Scania, Sweden
- Died: 15 July 1937 (aged 58); Stockholm, Sweden
- Occupations: Writer, actor
- Years active: 1916–1935 (film)

Sam Ask (16 October 1878 – 15 July 1937) was a Swedish screenwriter and actor. He also directed the 1928 silent comedy film Erik XIV.

Ask was a long-time student at Lund University, and enrolled as a law student in 1897 although he never graduated before he formally ended his university studies in 1909.

== Selected filmography ==
- Kiss of Death (1916)
- The Outlaw and His Wife (1918)
- Synnöve Solbakken (1919)
- A Dangerous Wooing (1919)
- Robinson i skärgården (1920)
- Thora van Deken (1920)
- The Mill (1921)
- A Wild Bird (1921)
- A Fortune Hunter (1921)
- The Eyes of Love (1922)
- The Suitor from the Highway (1923)
- Iron Wills (1923)
- House Slaves (1923)
- Little Dorrit (1924)
- Charley's Aunt (1926)
- The Devil and the Smalander (1927)
- Erik XIV (1928)
- Flickan från Värmland (1931)
- Adventure in Pyjamas (1935)

== Bibliography ==
- Glavin, John. Dickens on Screen. Cambridge University Press, 2003.
