= Only a Dancing Girl =

1926 film

- Directed by: Olof Molander
- Screenplay by: Paul Merzbach; Olof Molander
- Based on: Pierre and Jean by Guy de Maupassant
- Produced by: Oscar Hemberg; Wladimir Wengeroff
- Starring: Lil Dagover; Walter Janssen; Harry Halm
- Cinematography: Hugo Edlund; Franz Planer
- Music by: Otto Stenzeel
- Production company: Isepa-Wengeroff Film
- Distributed by: Hirschel-Sofar-Film (Germany)
- Release date: 4 November 1926
- Running time: 90 minutes
- Countries: Germany; Sweden
- Languages: Silent; German intertitles

Only a Dancing Girl (German: Nur eine Tänzerin, Swedish: Bara en danserska) is a 1926 German-Swedish silent drama film directed by Olof Molander and starring Lil Dagover, Walter Janssen and Harry Halm. It is based on the novel Pierre and Jean by Guy de Maupassant.

The film's sets were designed by Franz Schroedter.

== Cast ==
- Lil Dagover as Marie Berner - varieté dansös
- Walter Janssen as Paul Zentler -notarie, författare
- Harry Halm as Heinrich Zentler -hans bror, åklagere
- Jakob Tiedtke as Ph Zentler, deras far
- Karin Swanström as fru Zentler
- Nils Aréhn as Ludwig Radinger - rådman
- Lucie Höflich as fru Radinger
- Ivan Hedqvist as Heinrich von Wittenberg
- Uno Henning as Fritz Lerma - konstnär
- Hans Albers as Restauranggäst
- Hertha von Walther as Anna Berner - Maries syster
- Clementine Plessner as kokerska hos Zentlers
- Hermann Picha as vän till Zentlers
- Robert Leffler as vän till Zentlers
- Hugo Döblin as Ej identifierad roll
- Michael Chernof as portvakt hos Zentlers
- Anna-Lisa Ryding as Grete Radinger - Pauls fästmö

== Bibliography ==
- Uwe Jens Schumann. Hans Albers: seine Filme, sein Leben. Heyne, 1980.
