= The Eyes of Love =

1922 film

- Directed by: John W. Brunius
- Written by: Sam Ask; John W. Brunius
- Starring: Gösta Ekman; Pauline Brunius; Vilhelm Bryde
- Cinematography: Hugo Edlund
- Production company: Svensk Filmindustri
- Distributed by: Svensk Filmindustri
- Release date: 2 October 1922
- Running time: 77 minutes
- Country: Sweden
- Languages: Silent; Swedish intertitles

Surviving footage from The Eyes of Love

The Eyes of Love or A Scarlet Angel (Swedish: Kärlekens ögon) is a 1922 Swedish silent drama film directed by John W. Brunius and starring Gösta Ekman, Pauline Brunius and Vilhelm Bryde. It was shot at the Råsunda Studios in Stockholm.

== Cast ==
- Gösta Ekman as Henry Warden
- Pauline Brunius as Louise Kent
- Karen Winther as Elsie Campbell
- Vilhelm Bryde as Charles Zukor
- Jenny Tschernichin-Larsson as Henry's Mother
- Carl Browallius as Henry's Father
- Justus Hagman as Elise's Father
- Nils Lundell as Waiter

== Bibliography ==
- Hjort, Mette & Lindqvist, Ursula. A Companion to Nordic Cinema. John Wiley & Sons, 2016.
- Sadoul, Georges. Dictionary of Film Makers. University of California Press, 1972.
