= Thora van Deken =

1920 film by John W. Brunius

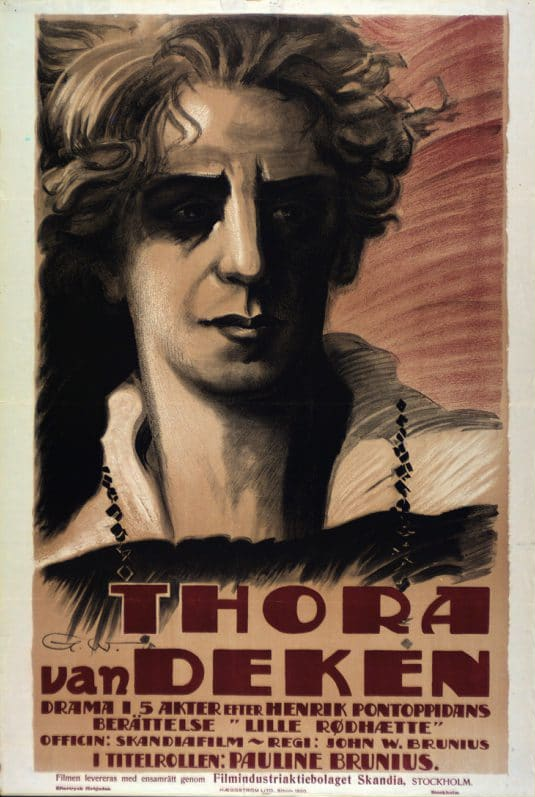
- Directed by: John W. Brunius
- Written by: Henrik Pontoppidan (novel); Sam Ask; John W. Brunius
- Starring: Pauline Brunius; Hugo Björne; Gösta Ekman
- Cinematography: Hugo Edlund
- Production company: Filmindustri AB Skandia
- Distributed by: Filmindustri AB Skandia
- Release date: 15 March 1920
- Running time: 92 minutes
- Country: Sweden
- Languages: Silent; Swedish intertitles

Thora van Deken (1920)

Thora van Deken is a 1920 Swedish silent drama film directed by John W. Brunius and starring John's then wife Pauline Brunius, Hugo Björne and Gösta Ekman. The film's sets were designed by the art directors Vilhelm Bryde and Gustaf Hallén.

== Cast ==
- Pauline Brunius as Thora van Deken
- Hugo Björne as Niels Engelstoft
- Jessie Wessel as Esther Engelstoft
- Gösta Ekman as Bjerring
- Gösta Cederlund as Lars Sidenius
- Oscar Johansson as Brandt
- Sam Ask as Sandberg
- Mathilda Caspér as Housekeeper
- Ellen Dall as Sofie Brandt
- Louise Eneman-Wahlberg as Nurse
- Bengt Lindström as En pojke ca 4 ar

== Bibliography ==
- Sadoul, Georges. Dictionary of Film Makers. University of California Press, 1972.
