= Mary Johnson (actress) =

Swedish actress

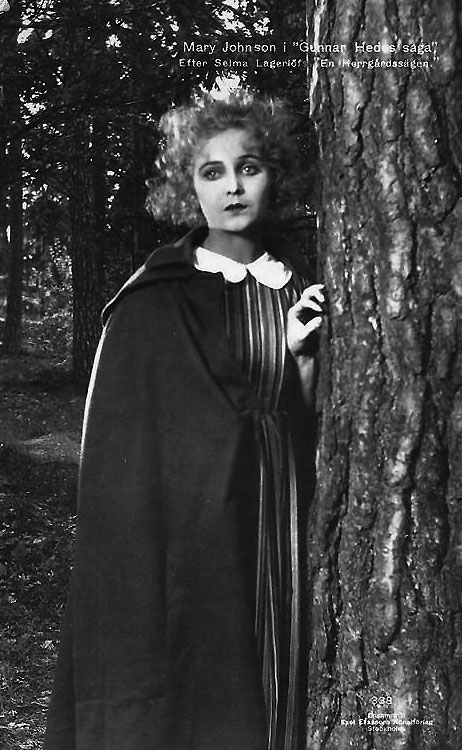
- Born: Astrid Maria Carlsson; 11 May 1896; Södermanland, Sweden
- Died: 15 May 1975 (aged 79); Brännkyrka, Sweden
- Occupation: Actress
- Years active: 1913–1931 (film)
- Spouses: Karl Gerhard (m. 1913; div. 1920) Einar Rød (m. 1920; died 1931) Rudolf Klein-Rogge (m. 1932; died 1955)

Mary Johnson (born Astrid Maria Carlsson; 11 May 1896 – 15 May 1975) was a Swedish film actress of the silent era.

== Biography ==
Astrid Maria Carlsson was born in Fors parish, Södermanland, Sweden. She debuted in the 1910s in the theater company of director Karin Swanström (1873–1942). In 1914, together with her first husband Karl Gerhard Johnson (1891–1964), she went to the Nya Teatern in Gothenburg acting under the direction of theatre manager Hjalmar Selander (1859–1928).

During the 1920s, she moved to Berlin and appeared as a leading lady in a number of German films. In 1932, she married German film actor, Rudolf Klein-Rogge (1885–1955). She died at Brännkyrka and was buried in the memorial grove of Skogskyrkogården in Stockholm.

== Selected filmography ==
- Sir Arne's Treasure (1919)
- Robinson i skärgården (1920)
- A Fortune Hunter (1921)
- Johan Ulfstjerna (1923)
- The Voice of the Heart (1924)
- The Telephone Operator (1925)
- Dagfin (1926)
- State Attorney Jordan (1926)
- The House of Lies (1926)
- The Strange Case of Captain Ramper (1927)
- Caught in Berlin's Underworld (1927)
- Artists (1928)
- Life's Circus (1928)
- Sex in Chains (1928)
- Luce Blu (2024)

== Bibliography ==
- Kwiatkowski, Aleksander. Swedish Film Classics. Courier Dover Publications, 2013.
- William B. Parrill. European Silent Films on Video: A Critical Guide. McFarland, 2006.
