= Magda Holm =

Swedish actress (1898–1982)

- Born: 14 November 1898; Gamleby, Sweden
- Died: 6 October 1982 (aged 83); Kalmar, Sweden
- Occupation: Actress
- Years active: 1924–1932 (film)

Magda Ebba Maria Holm (14 November 1898 – 6 October 1982) was a Swedish stage actress. She also appeared in eight films during the silent and early sound era.

== Selected filmography ==
- The Counts at Svansta (1924)
- A Maid Among Maids (1924)
- Where the Lighthouse Flashes (1924)
- 40 Skipper Street (1925)
- The Girl in Tails (1926)
- Charley's Aunt (1926)
- Syv dage for Elisabeth (1927)
- Mother-in-Law's Coming (1932)

== Bibliography ==
- Gustafsson, Tommy. Masculinity in the Golden Age of Swedish Cinema: A Cultural Analysis of 1920s Films. McFarland, 2014.
