= Paul Seelig =

Swedish actor (1900-1931)

- Born: 5 October 1900; Copenhagen, Denmark
- Died: 5 August 1931 (aged 30); Cannes, France
- Other name: Paul van der Osten
- Occupation: Actor
- Years active: 1913–1931

Paul Seelig (5 October 1900 – 5 August 1931) was a Swedish actor. He appeared in about 15 roles in films 1913 and 1931. His film debut was in Mauritz Stiller's film En pojke i livets strid in 1913, when he was thirteen years old.

He was the son of the actor and tour leader Emil van der Osten (1848-1905) and the actress Lotten Lundberg-Seelig (1867-1924). Paul Seelig left Sweden in the late 1920s, first to film in Germany, then at Paramount in Paris. In the summer of 1931, he was killed in France, under yet-unknown circumstances.

== Selected filmography ==
- En pojke i livets strid (1913)
- A Wild Bird (1921)
- Vem dömer (1922)
- Johan Ulfstjerna (1923)
- The People of Simlang Valley (1924)
- Charles XII (1925)
- The Österman Brothers' Virago (1925)
- Min fru har en fästman (1926)
- Arnljot (1927)
- Trådlöst och kärleksfullt (1931)
- Generalen (1931)
