= Gustaf Wasa (film) =

1928 film

- Directed by: John W. Brunius
- Written by: Ivar Johansson
- Starring: Gösta Ekman; Edvin Adolphson; John Ericsson
- Cinematography: Hugo Edlund
- Production company: Wasa Film
- Release dates: 5 March 1928 (part 1); 12 March 1928 (part 2)
- Running time: 103 minutes (part 1); 111 minutes (part 2)
- Country: Sweden
- Languages: Silent; Swedish intertitles

Gustaf Wasa (1928)

Gustaf Wasa is a 1928 Swedish silent historical epic film directed by John W. Brunius and starring Gösta Ekman, Edvin Adolphson and John Ericsson. It is based on the life of the sixteenth century Swedish king Gustav I. It was released in two parts, premiering a week apart.

This was the debut film for Swedish actress Signhild Björkman. Prints of the film still exist.

== Cast ==
- Gösta Ekman as Gustaf Eriksson Wasa
- Edvin Adolphson as Kristian II of Denmark
- Hugo Björne as Sten Sture
- Hjalmar Selander as Matts Ers
- John Ericsson as Mats Ersson
- Estery Ericsson as Ma Brita
- Nils Lundell as Tobias
- Karl-Magnus Thulstrup as Pers-Olle
- Gustaf Aronsson as Henrik Möller
- Sture Baude as Archbishop Gustaf Trolle
- Bror Berger as The executioner
- Erik 'Bullen' Berglund as Claus, sentry at Kalö
- Signhild Björkman as Dyveke
- Renée Björling as Margareta Brahe
- John Borgh as Cord König
- Tor Borong as Doctor at Åsunden
- Pauline Brunius as Kristina Gyllenstjerna
- Bertil Brusewitz as Bishop Jens Beldenacke
- Elsa Burnett as Daughter at Svärdsjögården
- Sickan Castegren as Mother of Matts Ers
- Erland Colliander as Henrik Slagheck
- Carl Ericson as Swedish farmer that doubts Gustaf Wasa
- Gösta Ericsson as Jörgen, sentry at Kalö
- Nils Ericsson as Nobleman at Kalö
- Siegfried Fischer as Nobleman at Kalö
- Pierre Fredriksson as Erik Banér
- Algot Gunnarsson as Nils Bröms, mayor of Lübeck
- Justus Hagman as Elias at Tronnevik
- Wictor Hagman as Kneeling man at side of wounded Sten Sture
- Carl Harald as Nobleman at Kalö
- Weyler Hildebrand as Danish Captain
- Thure Holm as Henrik Smed
- Erik Johansson as Man at King Kristian's court
- Rupert Johansson as Nobleman at Kalö
- Karl Jonsson as Commander at Kalö
- Olof Krook as Mathias, Bishop of Strängnäs
- Uno Küller as Nils Lykke
- Herman Lantz as Commander at the Stockholm bloodbath
- Sven Lindström as Bishop Didrik Slagheck
- Alfred Lundberg as Mayor of Stockholm
- Hjalmar Peters as Hermann Israel
- Axel Precht as Jakob Ulfsson, former Archbishop
- Sven Quick as Father of Matts Ers
- Gustav Ranft as Hemming Gadh
- Carl Ström as Joakim Brahe
- Karin Swanström as Sigbrit
- Nils Waldt as Servant of Sten Sture
- Ernst Öberg as Vicentius - Bishop of Skara

== Bibliography ==
- Gustafsson, Tommy. Masculinity in the Golden Age of Swedish Cinema: A Cultural Analysis of 1920s Films. McFarland, 2014.
- Klossner, Michael. The Europe of 1500-1815 on Film and Television: A Worldwide Filmography of Over 2550 Works, 1895 Through 2000. McFarland & Company, 2002.
- Sadoul, Georges. Dictionary of Film Makers. University of California Press, 1972.
