= She Is the Only One =

1926 film

- Directed by: Gustaf Molander
- Written by: Ragnar Hyltén-Cavallius
- Based on: Il ne faut jurer de rien by Alfred de Musset
- Produced by: Harry Malmstedt; Paul Merzbach
- Starring: Alphons Fryland; Vera Voronina; Ivan Hedqvist
- Cinematography: Julius Jaenzon
- Production company: Svensk-Selected
- Distributed by: Svenska Biografteaterns Filmbyrå; UFA (Germany)
- Release date: 8 November 1926
- Running time: 114 minutes
- Country: Sweden
- Languages: Silent; Swedish intertitles

She Is the Only One (Swedish: Hon, den enda) is a 1926 Swedish silent drama film directed by Gustaf Molander and starring Alphons Fryland, Vera Voronina and Ivan Hedqvist. The film was based on a nineteenth-century play by French author Alfred de Musset. It was shot at the Råsunda Studios in Stockholm and on location in Paris, Biarritz and the Château d'Abbadia in France. The film's sets were designed by the art director Vilhelm Bryde. It was distributed in Germany by UFA who may have input on the film's production decisions.

== Plot ==
Valentin, a resident of Paris, enjoys an extravagant meal with Inez Maria, who is flirtatious. However, their encounter is interrupted by the arrival of a friend who displays his own successful seductive tactics, leaving Valentin feeling somewhat upset. In response, Valentin decides to leave for Castro del Prado, located in the Pyrenees, where he meets Dolores.

== Cast ==
- Alphons Fryland as Valentin von Zanten
- Vera Voronina as Dolores del Prado
- Ivan Hedqvist as Louis van Zanten
- Margit Manstad as Inez Maria
- Gunnar Unger as Donald Brooke
- Edvin Adolphson as the friend
- Lydia Potechina as Rosa del Prado
- Axel Hultman as the innkeeper
- Sven Bergvall as the jealous man
- Maja Cassel as the wife of the jealous man
- Ragnar Arvedson as the secretary
- Brita Appelgren as young Dolores
- Justus Hagman as the servant
- Nils Ohlin as a visitor
- Tom Walter as the boy at the inn
- Torsten Winge as a visitor

== Bibliography ==
- Gustafsson, Tommy. Masculinity in the Golden Age of Swedish Cinema: A Cultural Analysis of 1920s Films. McFarland, 2014. ISBN 0786494786, 978-0786494781
- Qvist, Per Olov & von Bagh, Peter. Guide to the Cinema of Sweden and Finland. Greenwood Publishing Group, 2000. ISBN 0274958899, 978-0313303777
