= A Fortune Hunter =

1921 film directed by John W. Bruniu

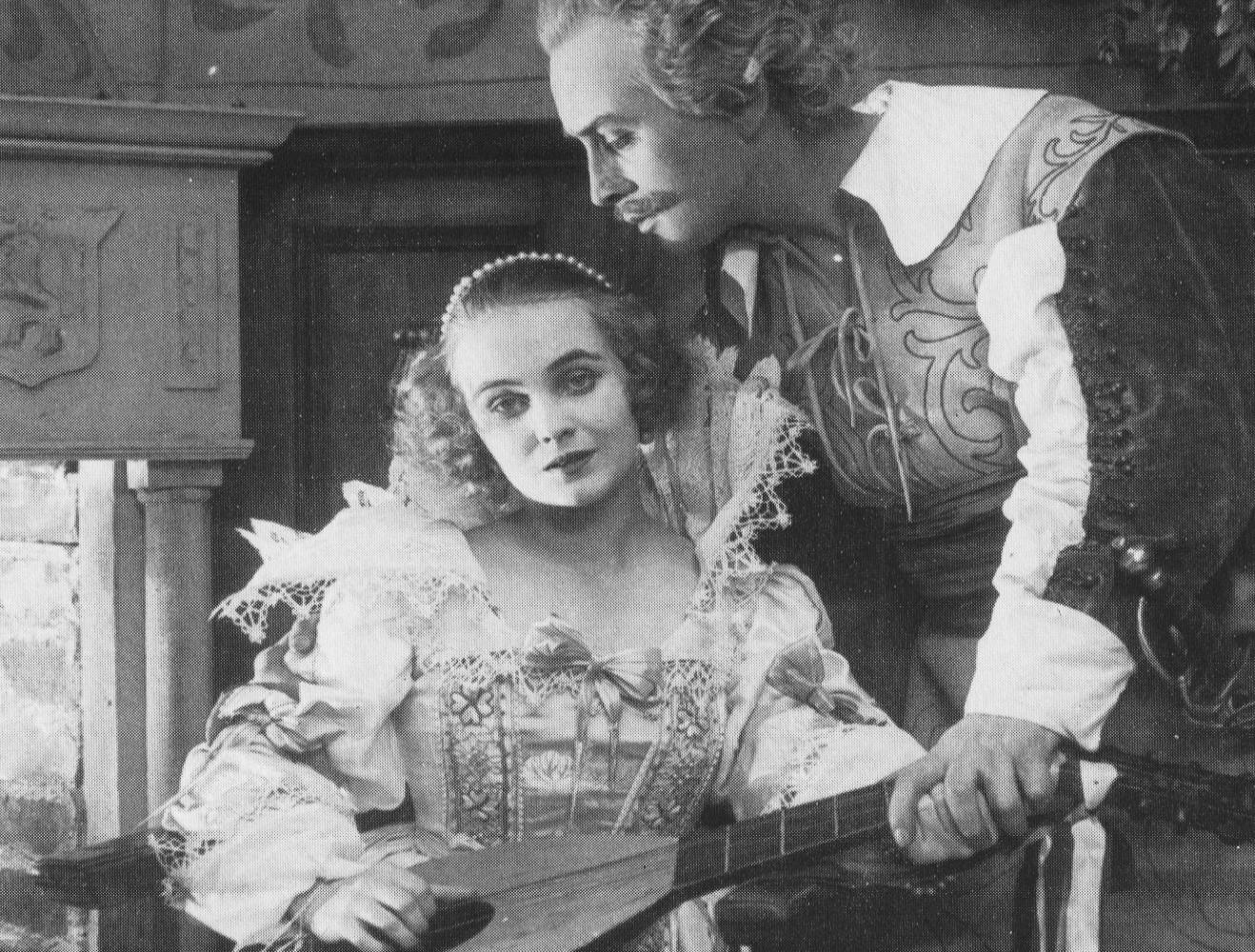
- Directed by: John W. Brunius
- Written by: Sam Ask; John W. Brunius
- Based on: A Fortune Hunter by Harald Molander
- Starring: Gösta Ekman; Mary Johnson; Axel Ringvall
- Cinematography: Hugo Edlund
- Production company: Svensk Filmindustri
- Distributed by: Svensk Filmindustri
- Release date: 14 March 1921
- Running time: 95 minutes
- Country: Sweden
- Languages: Silent; Swedish intertitles

A Fortune Hunter (Swedish: En lyckoriddare) is a 1921 Swedish silent historical drama film directed and cowritten by John W. Brunius and starring Gösta Ekman, Mary Johnson and Axel Ringvall. Future star Greta Garbo appears in a small role as a maid at a tavern. The film's sets were designed by the art directors Gustaf Hallén and Vilhelm Bryde. It is now considered a lost film.

== Cast ==
- Gösta Ekman as Lars Wiwalt
- Mary Johnson as Gertrud Wulffsdotter
- Axel Ringvall as Wulff Grijp
- Hilda Forsslund as Lena Daa
- Nils Lundell as Clement
- Vilhelm Bryde as Rönnow Bilde
- Gösta Cederlund as Niels Kagg
- Gull Natorp as Mrs. Margarete Grijp
- Carlo Keil-Möller as Erich Gyllenstierna
- Arthur Natorp as Andreas Anundi
- Semmy Friedmann as Henri de Bresignac
- Greta Garbo as Maid
- Alva Garbo as Girl in Tavern
- Alfred Lundberg as Priest

== Bibliography ==
- Gustafsson, Tommy. Masculinity in the Golden Age of Swedish Cinema: A Cultural Analysis of 1920s Films. McFarland, 2014.
- Sadoul, Georges. Dictionary of Film Makers. University of California Press, 1972.
