= Ivan Hedqvist =

Swedish actor

- Born: 8 June 1880; Gottröra, Sweden-Norway
- Died: 23 August 1935 (aged 55); Stockholm, Sweden
- Occupations: Actor, director
- Years active: 1910-1932 (film)

Ivan Hedqvist (8 June 1880 – 23 August 1935) was a Swedish stage and film actor. He also directed four silent films.

== Selected filmography ==
- Johan Ulfstjerna (1923)
- Life in the Country (1924)
- Ingmar's Inheritance (1925)
- Uncle Frans (1926)
- Only a Dancing Girl (1926)
- She Is the Only One (1926)
- To the Orient (1926)
- A Sister of Six (1926)
- Sin (1928)
- The Doctor's Secret (1930)
- The Two of Us (1930)

== Bibliography ==
- Tommy Gustafsson. Masculinity in the Golden Age of Swedish Cinema: A Cultural Analysis of 1920s Films. McFarland, 2014.
