= Georg Blomstedt =

Swedish architect and actor

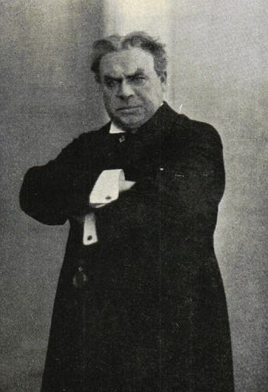
- Born: 22 December 1872; Ringarum, Sweden
- Died: 30 June 1933 (aged 60); Stockholm, Sweden
- Occupation: Actor
- Years active: 1917–1933 (film)

Georg Blomstedt (1872–1933) was a Swedish stage and film actor.

== Selected filmography ==
- The Lass from the Stormy Croft (1917)
- Thomas Graal's Ward (1922)
- Boman at the Exhibition (1923)
- The People of Simlang Valley (1924)
- A Maid Among Maids (1924)
- Ingmar's Inheritance (1925)
- Kalle Utter (1925)
- The Österman Brothers' Virago (1925)
- The Million Dollars (1926)
- The Rivals (1926)
- The Girl in Tails (1926)
- Parisiennes (1928)
- Artificial Svensson (1929)
- Ulla, My Ulla (1930)
- The People of Norrland (1930)
- Longing for the Sea (1931)
- Ship Ahoy! (1931)
- His Life's Match (1932)
- Jolly Musicians (1932)
- International Match (1932)

== Bibliography ==
- Cowie, Peter. Swedish Cinema. Zwemmer, 1966.
