= Olga Andersson =

Swedish actress (1876–1943)

- Andersson in 1911.
- Born: 1 October 1876; Stockholm, Sweden
- Died: 6 November 1943 (aged 67); Stockholm, Sweden
- Occupation: Actress
- Years active: 1920-1943 (film)

Olga Andersson (1 October 1876 – 6 November 1943) was a Swedish film and stage actress. She appeared in 25 films as a character actress between 1920 and her death in 1943.

== Selected filmography ==
- Her Little Majesty (1925)
- The Tales of Ensign Stål (1926)
- His English Wife (1927)
- A Perfect Gentleman (1927)
- International Match (1932)
- Kanske en gentleman (1935)
- Kungen kommer (1936)
- The Quartet That Split Up (1936)
- The Lady Becomes a Maid (1936)
- Sara Learns Manners (1937)
- Emelie Högqvist (1939)
- A Sailor on Horseback (1940)
- Her Melody (1940)
- Nothing Is Forgotten (1942)
- The Case of Ingegerd Bremssen (1942)
- I dag gifter sig min man (1943)
- In Darkest Smaland (1943)

== Bibliography ==
- Quirk, Lawrence J. The Films of Ingrid Bergman. Carol Publishing Group, 1975.
- Swenson, Karen. Greta Garbo. Simon & Schuster, 1997.
