= John Ericsson (actor) =

Swedish actor

- Born: 20 April 1883; Österfärnebo, Sweden
- Died: 10 September 1945 (aged 62); Stockholm, Sweden
- Occupation: Actor
- Years active: 1922-1945 (film)

John Ericsson (born Johan Eriksson; 20 April 1883 – 10 September 1945), also known as Lång-Jerker Ericsson, was a Swedish film and stage actor. He played the title role in the 1926 silent epic The Tales of Ensign Stål.

Born Johan Eriksson in Österfärnebo, Sweden, Ericsson was active in the film industry 1922–1945 and died in Stockholm.

== Selected filmography ==
- The Tales of Ensign Stål (1926)
- Gustaf Wasa (1928)
- Pettersson and Bendel (1933)
- Andersson's Kalle (1934)
- Järnets män (1935)
- The Count of the Old Town (1935)
- Poor Millionaires (1936)
- The Ghost of Bragehus (1936)
- The People of Bergslagen (1937)
- John Ericsson, Victor of Hampton Roads (1937)
- A Woman's Face (1938)
- The Three of Us (1940)
- Dunungen (1941)
- Goransson's Boy (1941)
- Lasse Maja (1941)
- General von Döbeln (1942)
- Ride Tonight! (1942)
- Night in Port (1943)
- There's a Fire Burning (1943)
- Life in the Country (1943)

== Bibliography ==
- Klossner, Michael. The Europe of 1500-1815 on Film and Television: A Worldwide Filmography of Over 2550 Works, 1895 Through 2000. McFarland & Company, 2002.
