= Nils Lundell =

Swedish actor

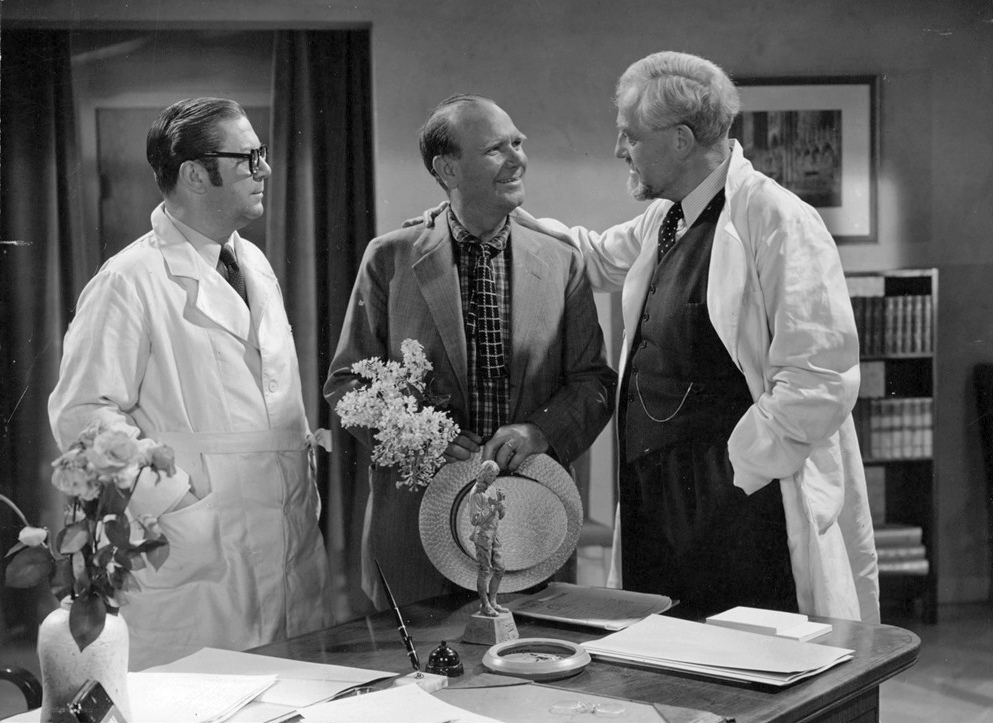
- "The Battle Goes On", 1941. Bullen Berglund, Nils Lundell & Victor Sjöström.
- Born: 23 December 1889; Stockholm, Sweden
- Died: 11 July 1943 (aged 53)
- Occupation: Actor
- Years active: 1917-1943

Nils Lundell (23 December 1889 – 11 July 1943) was a Swedish actor. He appeared in more than 50 films between 1917 and 1943.

== Selected filmography ==
- Karin Daughter of Ingmar (1920)
- The Mill (1921)
- A Wild Bird (1921)
- A Fortune Hunter (1921)
- The Eyes of Love (1922)
- Charles XII's Courier (1924)
- A Maid Among Maids (1924)
- The Österman Brothers' Virago (1925)
- Gustaf Wasa (1928)
- Longing for the Sea (1931)
- Colourful Pages (1931)
- Love and Deficit (1932)
- His Life's Match (1932)
- Black Roses (1932)
- The Women Around Larsson (1934)
- Fired (1934)
- Melody of the Sea (1934)
- Raggen (1936)
- The Quartet That Split Up (1936)
- Sun Over Sweden (1938)
- We at Solglantan (1939)
- The Fight Continues (1941)
- In Paradise (1941)
- If I Could Marry the Minister (1941)
- Tomorrow's Melody (1942)
- The Case of Ingegerd Bremssen (1942)
- Take Care of Ulla (1942)
- The Yellow Clinic (1942)
- The Sin of Anna Lans (1943)
- Captured by a Voice (1943)
- The Sixth Shot (1943)
