= Renée Björling =

Swedish actress

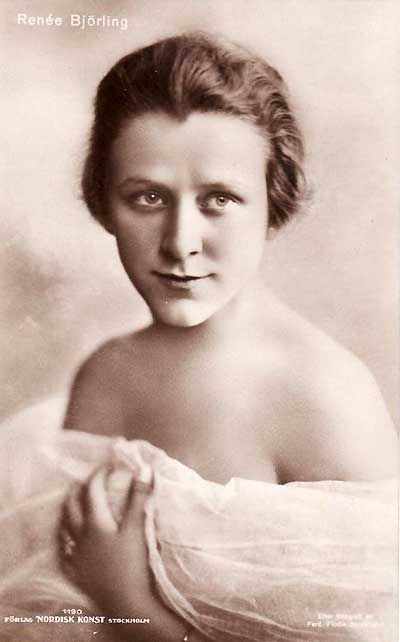
- Born: 10 July 1898; Lovö, Sweden
- Died: 4 March 1975 (aged 76); Täby, Sweden
- Occupation: Actress
- Years active: 1912-1968

Renée Björling (10 July 1898 – 4 March 1975) was a Swedish film actress. She was born in Lovö, Sweden and died in Täby.

== Partial filmography ==
- Tre indvendige Jomfruer (1914) - Daughter
- The Downy Girl (1919) - Anne-Marie Ehinger
- The Monastery of Sendomir (1920) - Dortka
- Carolina Rediviva (1920) - Carola
- Vallfarten till Kevlaar (1921) - Gretchen
- A Wild Bird (1921) - Alice Brenner
- Fröken Fob (1923) - Fob
- Norrtullsligan (1923) - Eva
- Halta Lena och Vindögda Per (1924) - Magda
- Charles XII's Courier (1924) - Anna Björnhufvud
- Life in the Country (1924) - Frida von Rambow
- Två konungar (1925) - Ann-Charlotte von Stapelmohr
- Charley's Aunt (1926) - Kitty Werden
- Gustaf Wasa (1928) - Margareta Brahe
- Servant's Entrance (1932) - Astrid Beck
- Vi som går kjøkkenveien (1933) - Astrid, Beck's daughter
- The Fight Continues (1941) - Betty Berg
- Släkten är bäst (1944) - Ebba Ekberg
- I Am Fire and Air (1944) - Miss Schultze
- The Serious Game (1945) - Ester Roslin
- Brita in the Merchant's House (1946) - Hans fru
- Summer Interlude (1951) - Aunt Elisabeth
- Defiance (1952) - Ove and Marianne's mother (uncredited)
- Summer with Monika (1953) - Görans fru (uncredited)
- The Girl from Backafall (1953) - Mrs. Dücker
- The Beat of Wings in the Night (1953) - Else Rönne
- A Lesson in Love (1954) - Svea Erneman
- Simon the Sinner (1954) - Woman Drinking Coffee
- The Girl in the Rain (1955) - Maria, Principal
- Dreams (1955) - Mrs. Berger (uncredited)
- Getting Married (1955) - Woman on carriage (uncredited)
- Så tuktas kärleken (1955) - Mrs. Grinnan
- Det är aldrig för sent (1956) - Jeanne
- Stage Entrance (1956) - Edit Strand
- Night Light (1957) - Mrs. Wilhelmsson
- Woman in a Fur Coat (1958) - Mathilde Croneman
- Heart's Desire (1960) - Aurore, Patrik's Mother
- Kärlekens decimaler (1960) - Mrs. Lind
