= Iron Wills =

1923 film by John W. Brunius

- Directed by: John W. Brunius
- Written by: Knut Hamsun (novel); Sam Ask; John W. Brunius
- Starring: Eugen Skjønberg; Linnéa Hillberg; Torsten Hillberg
- Cinematography: Hugo Edlund
- Production company: Svensk Filmindustri
- Distributed by: Svensk Filmindustri
- Release date: 5 March 1923
- Running time: 67 minutes
- Country: Sweden
- Languages: Silent; Swedish intertitles

Iron Wills (Swedish: Hårda viljor) is a 1923 Swedish silent drama film directed by John W. Brunius and starring Eugen Skjønberg, Linnéa Hillberg and Torsten Hillberg. It was shot at the Råsunda Studios in Stockholm and on location in Norway. The film's sets were designed by the art director Axel Esbensen.

== Plot ==
Iron Wills (1923)

Fredrik Mack owns a large glue factory in a fishing village in Northern Norway. Mack is the most powerful man in the area. Among his subordinates is the telegraph operator Ove Rolandsen, a real ladies' man who shamelessly takes advantage of the affection that Marie van Loos, the local priest's housekeeper, has for him. Rolandsen lives with the fisherman Levion, where, in his spare time, he experimented with and invented a glue that is better than Mack's.

When Mack's daughter Elise returns from her studies in Kristiania, Rolandsen pursues her. She is not completely immune to his charm but is also wooed by the more stately Captain Henriksen. There is a heated argument between Marie van Loos and the over-refreshed Rolandsen at a party at Mack's house. Captain Henriksen takes advantage of the situation and tricks Rolandsen into proposing to Elise, who mockingly rejects him. This leads to his public humiliation and sudden engagement to Marie.

After a burglary at Mack's house, Rolandsen, in need of money, falsely confesses to the crime and receives the reward offered for identifying the thief, even if it was the thief themselves. This results in Rolandsen losing both his job and fiancée. He redeems himself by rescuing Elise from an assault. The real burglar is later revealed to be the poacher and moonshiner Enok, clearing Rolandsen's name. Ultimately, Rolandsen receives a lucrative patent offer for his glue and forms a business partnership with Mack. He and Elise reconcile and unite their futures.

== Cast ==
- Eugen Skjønberg as Ove Rolandsen
- Linnéa Hillberg as Marie van Loos
- Torsten Hillberg as Fredrik Mack Jr.
- Karin Alexandersson as Priest's Wife
- Solveig Bang as Helga Levion
- Lilla Bye as Elise Mack
- Helge Kihlberg as Guest
- William Larsson as Levion
- Yngve Nyqvist as Henriksen
- Gustav Ranft as Fredrik Mack Sr.
- Carl Ström as Priest
- Albert Ståhl as Enok

== Bibliography ==
- Hjort, Mette & Lindqvist, Ursula. A Companion to Nordic Cinema. John Wiley & Sons, 2016.
- Sadoul, Georges. Dictionary of Film Makers. University of California Press, 1972.
