= A Sister of Six (1926 film) =

1926 film

- Swedish theatrical poster
- Directed by: Ragnar Hyltén-Cavallius
- Written by: Paul Merzbach; Ragnar Hyltén-Cavallius
- Based on: A Gyurkovics-lányok by Ferenc Herczeg
- Starring: Willy Fritsch; Betty Balfour; Lydia Potechina
- Cinematography: Carl Hoffmann
- Edited by: Carl Hoffmann; Ragnar Hyltén-Cavallius
- Music by: Werner R. Heymann
- Production companies: Isepa; UFA
- Distributed by: UFA (Germany); Woolf & Freedman Film Service (UK)
- Release date: 26 December 1926
- Countries: Germany; Sweden; United Kingdom
- Languages: Silent; English, Swedish, German intertitles

A Sister of Six (German title: Die sieben Töchter der Frau Gyurkovics, Swedish title: Flickorna Gyurkovics) is a 1926 silent romantic comedy film directed by Ragnar Hyltén-Cavallius and starring Willy Fritsch, Betty Balfour and Lydia Potechina. It was a co-production between Germany, Sweden and the United Kingdom. It was shot at the Tempelhof Studios in Berlin. The film's sets were designed by the Swedish art director Vilhelm Bryde.

== Cast ==
- Willy Fritsch as Count Horkay
- Betty Balfour as Mizzi
- Anna-Lisa Ryding as Katinka
- Lydia Potechina as Mrs. Gyurkovics
- Ivan Hedqvist as Colonel von Radvanyi
- Werner Fuetterer as Geza
- Karin Swanström as Countess Emilie Hohenstein
- Stina Berg as Countess Aurore Hohenstein
- Gunnar Unger as Lt. Semessey
- Axel Hultman as Captain Erdogy
- Tita Christescu
- Olga Engl
- Harry Halm
- Helene Hedin
- Anny Hintze
- Ruth Oberbörsch
- Sophie Pagay
- Gretl Schubert
- Elza Temary
- Truus Van Aalten
- Camilla von Hollay
- Iwa Wanja

== Bibliography ==
- Low, Rachael. History of the British Film, 1918-1929. George Allen & Unwin, 1971.
