= A Perfect Gentleman (1927 film) =

1927 film

- Directed by: Vilhelm Bryde; Gösta Ekman
- Written by: Hjalmar Bergman
- Starring: Gösta Ekman; La Jana; Karin Swanström; Hans Albers
- Cinematography: Axel Lindblom
- Edited by: Axel Lindblom
- Production companies: Film AB Minerva; Isepa-Wengeroff Film
- Release date: 26 December 1927
- Running time: 117 minutes
- Country: Sweden
- Languages: Silent; Swedish intertitles

A Perfect Gentleman (Swedish: En perfekt gentleman) is a 1927 Swedish silent drama film directed by Vilhelm Bryde and Gösta Ekman and starring Ekman, La Jana and Karin Swanström. It is sometimes also known by the alternative title of Husband by Proxy.

== Cast ==
- Gösta Ekman as Marquis Robert de Luny & Jean Coubert
- La Jana as Marquise Hortense
- Karin Swanström as Charlotte Ponson
- Hans Albers as Oberst Jacques Renard
- Eric Bertner as Pierre
- Otto Jacobsen as Marcel
- Helga Brofeldt as Schwester Rosalie
- Carl Browallius as Advokat Bonnard
- Albert Ranft as Kartenspielender Herr
- Oscar Byström as Ein älterer Mann
- Gucken Cederborg as Ein Weib
- Knut Lambert as Ein älterer Herr
- Mia Sernquist as Eine alte Frau
- Wilhelm Tunelli as Ein alter Mann
- Ellen Adelstam as Eine alte Dame
- Leo Golowin as Ein Herr
- Ragnar Arvedson as Ein Mann
- Ida Schylander as Ein Weib
- Sture Baude as Ein Mann
- Gerda Ström as Ein Weib
- Seth Hesslin as Ein Mann
- Gull Natorp
- Olga Andersson
- Erik Bergman
- Ragnar Billberg
- Mia Gründer
- Desdemona Schlichting

== Bibliography ==
- Gunnar Iverson, Astrid Soderbergh Widding & Tytti Soila. Nordic National Cinemas. Routledge, 2005.
