= A Maid Among Maids =

1924 film

- Directed by: John W. Brunius
- Written by: Carlo Keil-Möller
- Based on: A Maid Among Maids by Ester Blenda Nordström
- Starring: Magda Holm; Georg Blomstedt; Margit Manstad
- Cinematography: Hugo Edlund
- Production company: Svensk Filmindustri
- Distributed by: Svensk Filmindustri
- Release date: 31 March 1924
- Running time: 56 minutes
- Country: Sweden
- Languages: Silent; Swedish intertitles

A Maid Among Maids (Swedish: En piga bland pigor) is a 1924 Swedish silent comedy drama film directed by John W. Brunius and starring Magda Holm, Georg Blomstedt and Margit Manstad. It was shot at the Råsunda Studios in Stockholm. The film's sets were designed by the art director Ragnar Brattén. It was inspired by the 1914 book of the same title by Ester Blenda Nordström.

== Plot ==
Alice and Sven are engaged but they have somewhat different interests and approach to life. Alice is interested in having fun and dancing. Sven gets upset by her behavior. Things come to a head and they break off the engagement. Alice finds work as a maid on a farm.

== Interesting fact ==
In the 1910s, the writer Ester Blenda Nordström was a young journalist in Stockholm, seeking employment as a maid on a rural farm. Her motivation was to present an accurate picture of the hardships faced by the maids and the stark realities of the agricultural lifestyle. She spent a month working as a maid on a farm. Later she wrote about her experience, initially in a series of newspaper articles series and later in the popular book which inspired this film.

== Cast ==
- Magda Holm as Alice Halling
- Georg Blomstedt as Per Olof Berg
- Nils Lundell as August
- Ella Lennartsson as Lotta
- Margit Manstad as Karin Halling
- Ester Halling as Anna
- Carlo Keil-Möller as Sven Bille
- Ragnar Arvedson as Faustino della Novarro
- Hugo Tranberg as Matts Stengårdh
- Ingeborg Strandin as Farmerwife
- Gustav Runsten as Second Farm-hand
- Rosa Tillman as Guest at ladyparty

== Bibliography ==
- Sadoul, Georges. Dictionary of Film Makers. University of California Press, 1972.
