= Axel Hultman =

Swedish actor and swimmer (1869–1935)

- Born: 26 September 1869; Stockholm, Sweden
- Died: 4 December 1935 (aged 66); Lidingö, Sweden
- Occupation: Actor
- Years active: 1893-1929

Axel Hultman (26 September 1869 – 4 December 1935) was a Swedish stage actor, and a film actor of the silent era. He was also a competitive swimmer.

== Selected filmography ==
- Life in the Country (1924)
- First Mate Karlsson's Sweethearts (1925)
- A Sister of Six (1926)
- Charley's Aunt (1926)
- The Million Dollars (1926)
- She Is the Only One (1926)

== Bibliography ==
- Tommy Gustafsson. Masculinity in the Golden Age of Swedish Cinema: A Cultural Analysis of 1920s Films. McFarland, 2014.
