= Edvin Adolphson =

Swedish actor (1893–1979)

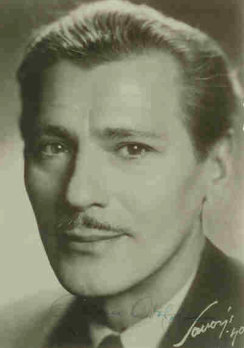
- Adolphson in 1940
- Born: Gustav Edvin Adolphson; 25 February 1893; Furingstad, Sweden-Norway
- Died: 31 October 1979 (aged 86); Solna, Sweden
- Occupation: Actor
- Years active: 1912–1968
- Spouses: Margot Chergée (m. 1916–1926) Harriet Bosse (m. 1927–1932) Mildred Mehle (m. 1932–1950) Ulla Balle-Jensen (m. 1952–1979)
- Partner: Majken Cullborg
- Children: Anna-Greta (with Chergée); Kari (with Mehle); Olle (with Mehle); Kristina (with Mehle); Per (with Mehle); Leo (with Cullborg)

Gustav Edvin Adolphson (25 February 1893 – 31 October 1979) was a Swedish film actor and director who appeared in over 500 roles. He made his debut in 1912. He appeared with Ingrid Bergman in Only One Night (1939), and is noted for his roles in the film Änglar, finns dom? (1961), the 1966 television version of August Strindberg's Hemsöborna, and as Markurell in Markurells i Wadköping (1968). He also directed the first Swedish sound film, Säg det i toner in 1929.

He was actress Harriet Bosse's third husband (1927–1932) and is father of actress Kristina Adolphson (b. 1937) and songwriter/composer Olle Adolphson (1934–2004). Adolphson was born in Furingstad, Sweden (Östergötland County), and died in Solna, a suburb of Stockholm, Sweden.

== Selected filmography ==
- A Wild Bird (1921)
- Thomas Graal's Ward (1922)
- New Pranks of Andersson's Kalle (1923)
- The Suitor from the Highway (1923)
- Where the Lighthouse Flashes (1924)
- The Flying Dutchman (1925)
- The Tales of Ensign Stål (1926)
- She Is the Only One (1926)
- To the Orient (1926)
- Sealed Lips (1927)
- Gustaf Wasa (1928)
- Jansson's Temptation (1928)
- The Triumph of the Heart (1929)
- Say It with Music (1929)
- The Two of Us (1930)
- Longing for the Sea (1931)
- Colourful Pages (1931)
- Ship Ahoy! (1931)
- Half Way to Heaven (1931)
- Love and Deficit (1932)
- Modern Wives (1932)
- Dear Relatives (1933)
- What Do Men Know? (1933)
- Man's Way with Women (1934)
- The Atlantic Adventure (1934)
- Munkbrogreven (1935)
- The Wedding Trip (1936)
- Johan Ulfstjerna (1936)
- John Ericsson, Victor of Hampton Roads (1937)
- Russian Flu (1938)
- Dollar (1938)
- Wanted (1939)
- Only One Night (1939)
- A Crime (1940)
- Med dej i mina armar (1940)
- Fröken Kyrkråtta (1941)
- Woman on Board (1941)
- Life Goes On (1941)
- Flames in the Dark (1942)
- General von Döbeln (1942)
- Nothing Is Forgotten (1942)
- The Sixth Shot (1943)
- She Thought It Was Him (1943)
- En dag skall gry (1944)
- The Gallows Man (1945)
- Kungliga patrasket (1945)
- Maria of Kvarngarden (1945)
- Man's Woman (1945)
- Desire (1946)
- Dinner for Two (1947)
- No Way Back (1947)
- The People of Simlang Valley (1947)
- Flottans kavaljerer (1948)
- A Swedish Tiger (1948)
- Playing Truant (1949)
- When Love Came to the Village (1950)
- The Quartet That Split Up (1950)
- Teacher's First Born (1950)
- The Saucepan Journey (1950)
- One Summer of Happiness (1951)
- The Nuthouse (1951)
- In the Arms of the Sea (1951)
- The Clang of the Pick (1952)
- One Fiancée at a Time (1952)
- The Chieftain of Göinge (1953)
- The Road to Klockrike (1953)
- The Beat of Wings in the Night (1953)
- Enchanted Walk (1954)
- Young Summer (1954)
- Men in the Dark (1955)
- The Summer Wind Blows (1955)
- Getting Married (1955)
- The Unicorn (1955)
- Darling of Mine (1955)
- Paradise (1955)
- Stage Entrance (1956)
- The Song of the Scarlet Flower (1956)
- A Little Nest (1956)
- Synnöve Solbakken (1957)
- Laila (1958)
- A Goat in the Garden (1958)
- The Phantom Carriage (1958)
- Heart's Desire (1960)
- Good Friends and Faithful Neighbours (1960)
- The Wedding Day (1960)
- Änglar, finns dom? (1961)
- Swedish Wedding Night (1964)
- Hemsöborna (1966)
