= The Tales of Ensign Stål (film) =

1926 film

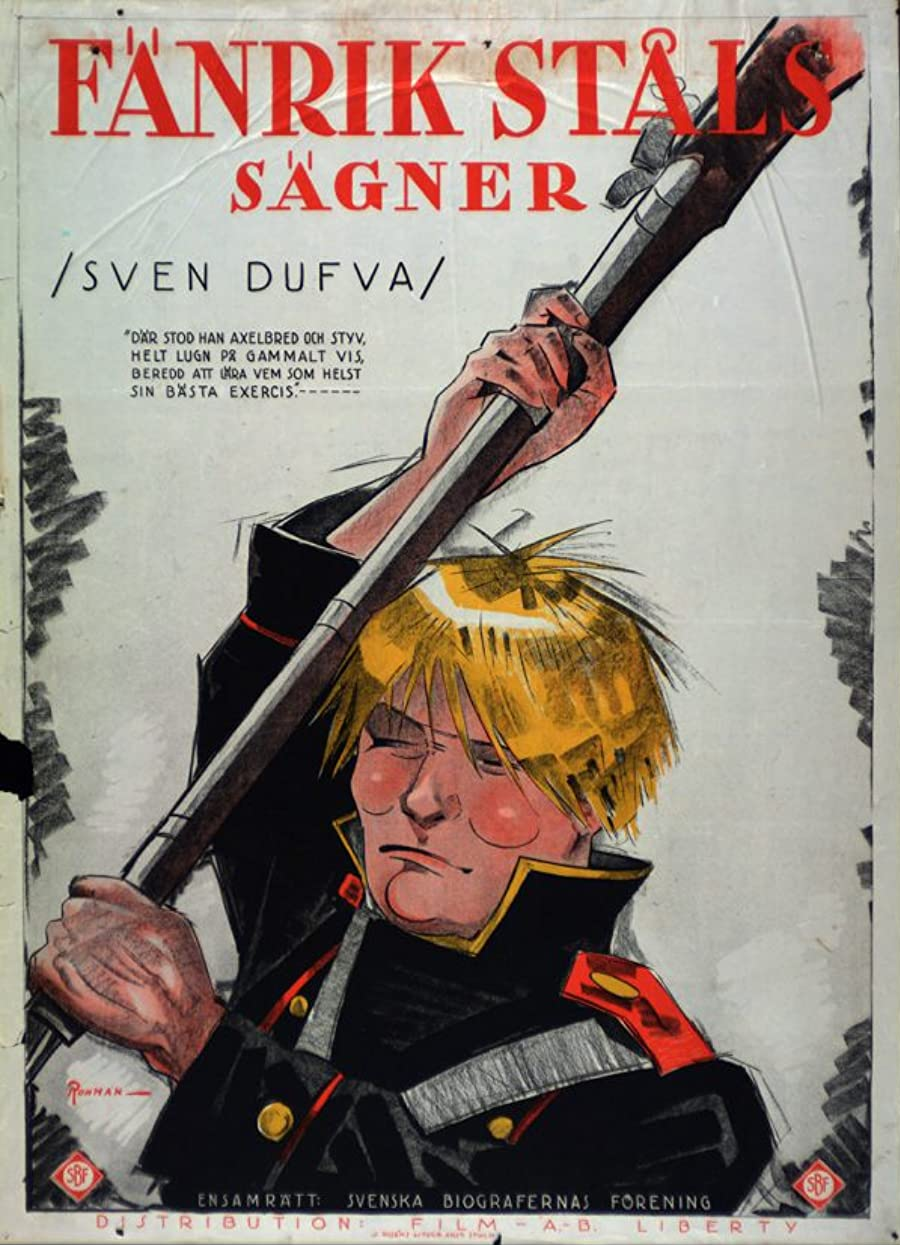
- Directed by: John W. Brunius
- Written by: Ivar Johansson
- Based on: The Tales of Ensign Stål by Johan Ludvig Runeberg
- Starring: John Ericsson; Edvin Adolphson; Olga Andersson
- Cinematography: Hugo Edlund
- Production company: Film AB Nordstjaernan
- Release date: 1 November 1926
- Running time: 184 minutes (2 parts)
- Country: Sweden
- Languages: Silent; Swedish intertitles

Part I

Part II

The Tales of Ensign Stål

The Tales of Ensign Stål (Swedish: Fänrik Ståls sägner) is a 1926 Swedish historical war film directed by John W. Brunius and starring John Ericsson, Edvin Adolphson and Olga Andersson. It is based on the epic poem The Tales of Ensign Stål by nineteenth century writer Johan Ludvig Runeberg set during the Finnish War during the Napoleonic Era in which Sweden lost Finland to the Russian Empire. It was shot at the Råsunda Studios in Stockholm. The film's sets were designed by the art director Vilhelm Bryde. It was released in two parts.

== Cast ==
- Edvin Adolphson as Col. Georg Karl von Döbeln
- Olga Andersson as Lady von Schwerin
- Hugo Björne as von Schwerin
- Artur Cederborgh as Peasant
- Thor Christiernsson as Lode
- Carl Deurell as Maj. Otto von Fieandt
- Anita Dorr as Karin
- Leopold Edin as Van Suchtelen
- Arvid Enström as Spelt
- John Ericsson as Lt. Stål
- Josef Fischer as Jägerhorn
- Einar Fröberg as Klingspor
- Ida Gawell-Blumenthal as Lotta Svärd
- Fredrik Gjerdrum as Cronstedt
- Vilhelm Hansson as Drufva
- Thure Holm as Von Törne
- Helge Karlsson as Munter
- Axel Lagerberg as Wibelius
- Sven Lindström as Löwenhielm
- Alfred Lundberg as Af Klercker
- Thor Modéen as Johan August Sandels
- Adolf Niska as Jakob Petrovitsh Kulnev
- Nils Ohlin as Wilhelm von Schwerin
- Gustav Ranft as Col. von Essen
- Edit Rolf as Inga
- Carl-Michael Runeberg as Johan Ludvig Runeberg
- Axel Slangus as Sven Dufva
- Oscar Textorius as Von Buxhovden
- Nils Wahlbom as Maj. Gen. Adlercreutz
- Anna-Lisa Wallin as Mrs. af Enehielm
- Anders Wikman as Captain af Enehielm

== Bibliography ==
- Gustafsson, Tommy. Masculinity in the Golden Age of Swedish Cinema: A Cultural Analysis of 1920s Films. McFarland, 2014.
- Sadoul, Georges. Dictionary of Film Makers. University of California Press, 1972.
