= John W. Brunius =

Swedish actor, writer and director

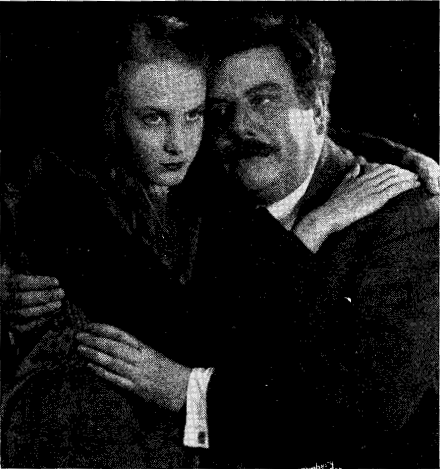
- John Brunius and his daughter Anne-Marie.
- Born: John Wilhelm Brunius; 26 December 1884; Stockholm, Sweden
- Died: 16 December 1937 (aged 52); Stockholm, Sweden
- Occupations: Actor, scriptwriter, film director
- Years active: 1904–1937
- Spouse: Pauline Brunius (m. 1909–1935)
- Children: Anne-Marie Brunius; Palle Brunius

John Wilhelm Brunius (26 December 1884 – 16 December 1937) was a Swedish actor, scriptwriter and film director.

== Biography ==
In 1902, he became a student at the Royal Dramatic Theatre. After studying abroad, he was employed at the Dramaten in 1905. He was engaged by Albert Ranft as an actor at the Svenska teatern in Stockholm in 1907 where he remained until 1925. With his spouse Pauline Brunius and colleague, Gösta Ekman (senior), he was the managing director of the theatre Oscarsteatern from 1926 to 1932. From 1935 to 1937 he was employed by the Göteborgs Stadsteater in Gothenburg.

He was married from 1909 to 1935 to actress Pauline Brunius. He was the father of actress Anne-Marie Brunius and actor and theatre director Palle Brunius.

== Selected filmography ==
- Synnöve Solbakken (1919)
- Gyurkovicsarna (1920)
- Thora van Deken (1920)
- A Wild Bird (1921)
- A Fortune Hunter (1921)
- The Mill (1921)
- The Eyes of Love (1922)
- Iron Wills (1923)
- Johan Ulfstjerna (1923)
- A Maid Among Maids (1924)
- Charles XII (1925)
- The Tales of Ensign Stål (1926)
- Gustaf Wasa (1928)
- The Doctor's Secret (1930)
- The Two of Us (1930)
- Longing for the Sea (1931)
- The Red Day (1931)
- False Greta (1934)
- Melody of the Sea (1934)
- Happy Vestköping (1937)
