= Margit Manstad =

Swedish actress

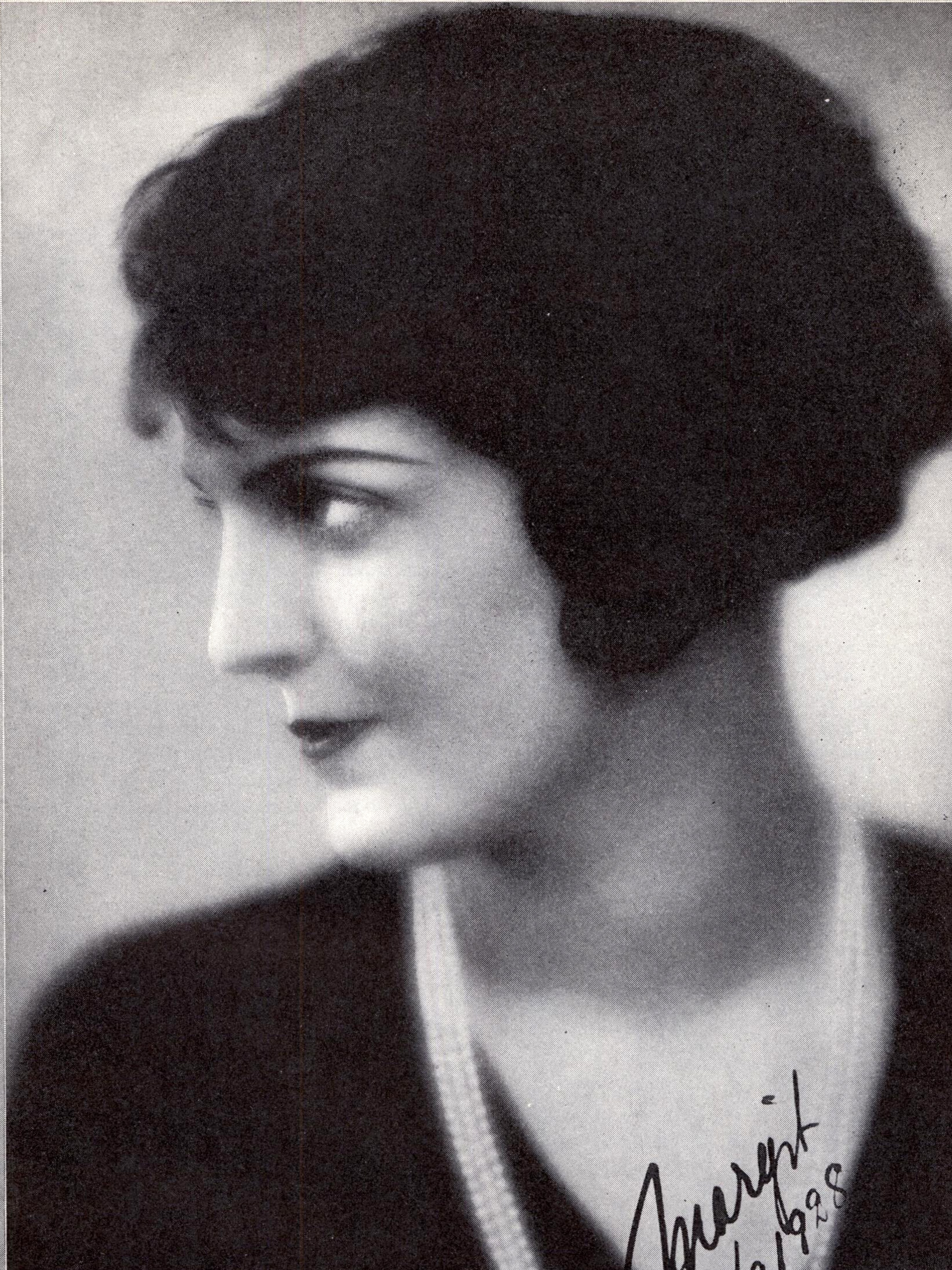
- Born: Margit Elfrida Cecilia Persson; 21 July 1902; Stockholm, Sweden
- Died: 23 March 1996 (aged 93); Stockholm, Sweden
- Occupation: Actress
- Years active: 1923–1946

Margit Manstad (21 July 1902 – 23 March 1996) was a Swedish actress. She was frequently cast in vampish roles.

== Selected filmography ==
- Anna-Clara and Her Brothers (1923)
- A Maid Among Maids (1924)
- The Lady of the Camellias (1925)
- Getting Married (1926)
- She Is the Only One (1926)
- His English Wife (1927)
- Angst (1928)
- Because I Love You (1928)
- Parisiennes (1928)
- Sweet Pepper (1929)
- The Alley Cat (1929)
- Say It with Music (1929)
- The Realm of the Rye (1929)
- The Two of Us (1930)
- The Storholmen Brothers (1932)
- Modern Wives (1932)
- What Do Men Know? (1933)
- The Atlantic Adventure (1934)
- Mother Gets Married (1937)
- Her Melody (1940)
- The Bjorck Family (1940)
- Nygifta (1941)
- Lasse-Maja (1941)
- In Paradise (1941)
- Sexlingar (1942)
- Adventurer (1942)
- Idel ädel adel (1945)

== Bibliography ==
- Bergfelder, Tim & Harris, Sue & Street, Sarah. Film Architecture and the Transnational Imagination: Set Design in 1930s European Cinema. Amsterdam University Press, 2007.
- Iverson, Gunnar, Soderbergh Widding, Astrid & Soila, Tytti. Nordic National Cinemas. Routledge, 2005.
