= Ragnar Hyltén-Cavallius =

Swedish screenwriter and film director

- Born: 27 November 1885; Stockholm, Sweden
- Died: 15 November 1970 (aged 84)
- Other name: Ragnar Gosta Hylten-Cavallius
- Years active: 1920 - 1946 (film)

Ragnar Hyltén-Cavallius (1885–1970) was a Swedish screenwriter and film director. Hyltén-Cavallius was of the screenwriters of the 1924 Greta Garbo film The Saga of Gosta Berling. He directed seven films including the 1926 co-production A Sister of Six.

He was awarded the Latvian Order of the Three Stars 4th Class on 16 May 1935.

== Selected filmography ==
=== Director ===
- A Sister of Six (1926)
- The Marriage Game (1935)
- Kungen kommer (1936)
- The Bells of the Old Town (1946)

=== Screenwriter ===
- House Slaves (1923)
- The Saga of Gosta Berling (1924)
- Ingmar's Inheritance (1925)
- To the Orient (1926)
- She Is the Only One (1926)
- Frida's Songs (1930)
- Black Roses (1932)
- Man's Way with Women (1934)
- Her Little Majesty (1939)
- The Bjorck Family (1940)

== Bibliography ==
- Kwiatkowski, Aleksander. Swedish Film Classics. Courier Corporation, 2013.
