= Gösta Ekman (senior) =

Swedish actor (1890–1938)

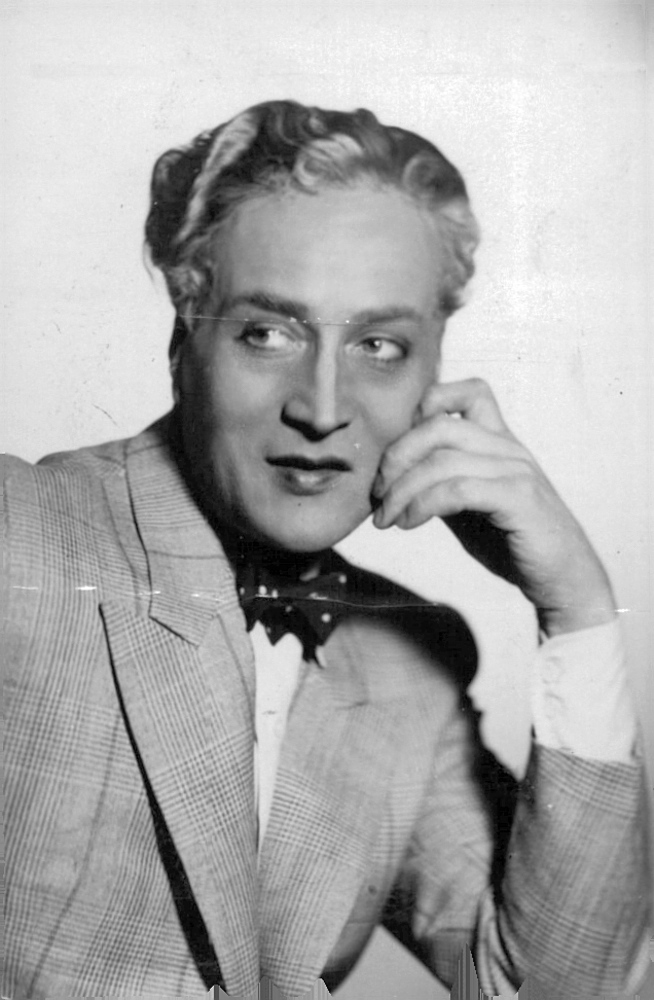
- Ekman in 1936
- Born: Frans Gösta Viktor Ekman; 28 December 1890; Stockholm, Sweden
- Died: 12 January 1938 (aged 47); Stockholm, Sweden
- Occupations: Actor; director; singer
- Years active: 1911–1937
- Spouse: Greta Sundström (m. 1914)
- Children: 2 (including Hasse)
- Relatives: Gösta Ekman (grandson)

Frans Gösta Viktor Ekman (28 December 1890 – 12 January 1938) was a Swedish actor, director and singer.

== Biography ==
=== Career ===
He was known as a self-taught master of disguise with theatre make-up and costumes, Gösta Ekman was equally convincing as a farmer's son, an 18th-century middle-aged aristocrat, or an 80-year-old lunatic. His talent allowed him to act in comedies, tragedies, dramas, and operettas. He was convincing in all genres and as all types of characters. At different times, he also ran and supervised several private theatres in Stockholm, including the Oscarsteatern, the Vasateatern, and the Konserthusteatern. He was also head of the Gothenburg City Theatre in the 1930s. At the Vasateatern, which he ran from 1931 to 1935, he both directed and played the lead in several plays, while also producing a large number of productions. As a result, his time at the Vasateatern is considered to be the peak of his stage career. He first entered the stage as an extra in an operetta in 1907, but made his professional stage debut in the renowned Selander Company in 1911. The ghost of Gösta Ekman is still said to haunt his former dressing room at the theatre.

Ekman started in films at the dawn of the Swedish film industry and played an important role in its development. One of his first film roles was in Victor Sjöström's experimental film Trädgårdsmästaren (1912). Later, he played the lead in the first Swedish talkie, For Her Sake (1930). Ekman also acted in two films that would gain international recognition: F. W. Murnau's silent film classic Faust, where he played the title character, and in the original 1936 version of Intermezzo, where he played a world-famous violinist opposite Ingrid Bergman in her breakout role. But they had in fact already acted opposite each other in the Swedish 1935 movie Swedenhielms where they share a couple of wonderful scenes alone together as their characters have a heart-to-heart conversation on life and love; among the most memorable moments in the film.

His best on-screen credit is often said to be his King Charles XV/Leonard Pettersson in film comedy Kungen kommer (1936), where Ekman masterfully plays a double-role in the film; first the king and then also the king's lookalike; an actor who is hired by members of the Royal Court to impersonate His Majesty at a private party. Naturally the real king later arrives at the party causing a number of confusions and comic mix-ups.

Ekman also made a number of successful song recordings from his revue numbers, including songs "En herre i frack" (1935) – perhaps his most popular recording – and "Kvinnor och champagne" (Women and Champagne) in 1929.

=== Personal life ===
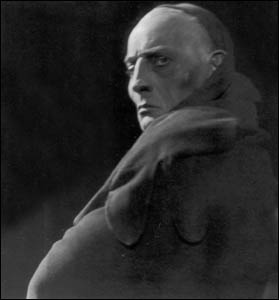
Ekman in the play Bödeln (The Hangman) by Pär Lagerkvist at Vasateatern, Stockholm, in 1934

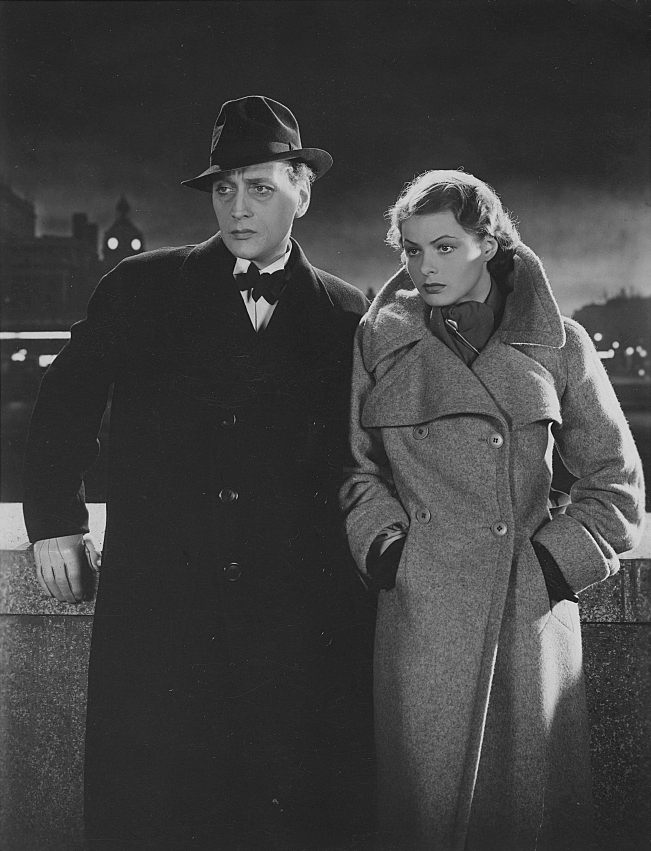
Ekman with Ingrid Bergman in Intermezzo (1936).

Early on, Gösta Ekman was labeled as a workaholic, sacrificing himself for his art and for his love of the theatre. Later, as his fame increased, his workload also increased. During the day, he would rehearse and direct plays. In the evening, he played leading roles in stage plays. Later at night, he would film. This busy schedule left him with relatively little free time. Furthermore, the free time he did have was spent carrying out his duties as the administrative director of the theatres he ran.

In 1926, while filming Faust in Berlin, he was introduced to cocaine by two Scandinavians, who told him that cocaine would help him cope with his work schedule better. Sadly, this began a long-term drug addiction for the actor that slowly deteriorated his health and eventually caused his death 12 years later at the age of 47.

In 1914, Gösta Ekman married Greta Sundström. Their son Hasse Ekman came to be one of Sweden's most successful film directors in the 1940s and 1950s. Gösta Ekman's grandson, Gösta Ekman Jr., also became well-known through his career as an actor and was considered to be one of Sweden's very finest actors. One of Hasse Ekman's movies, Kungliga patrasket from 1945 about a famous acting family, was partly based on his own upbringing in an acting family.

== Selected filmography ==
- The Gardener (1912)
- Mästerkatten i stövlar (1918)
- Thora van Deken (1920)
- Gyurkovicsarna (1920)
- A Fortune Hunter (1921)
- Vem dömer (1922)
- The Eyes of Love (1922)
- Charles XII's Courier (1924)
- Unge greven ta'r flickan och priset (1924)
- Charles XII (1925)
- Faust (1926)
- The Clown (1926)
- A Perfect Gentleman (1927)
- His English Wife (1927)
- The Last Night (1928)
- Gustaf Wasa (1928)
- For Her Sake (1930)
- Mach' mir die Welt zum Paradies (1930)
- Colourful Pages (1931)
- Dear Relatives (1933)
- Two Men and a Widow (1933)
- Perhaps a Poet (1933)
- København, Kalundborg og - ? (1934)
- Swedenhielms (1935)
- Kungen kommer (1936)
- Intermezzo (1936)
- Johan Ulfstjerna (1936)
- Witches' Night (1937)
- Än en gång Gösta Ekman (1940, edited and premiered after his death)

== Selected stage work ==
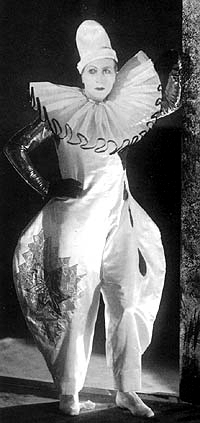
As HE/The Clown in play Han som får örfilarna (He Who Gets Slapped) by Leonid Andreyev at Oscarsteatern, Stockholm, 1926

- 1936 – The Wild Duck by Henrik Ibsen (part: Hjalmar Ekdahl)
- 1935 – En förtjusande fröken by Ralph Benatzky
- 1935 – Köpmannen i Venedig The Merchant of Venice by William Shakespeare (part: Shylock)
- 1934 – Peer Gynt by Henrik Ibsen (title role)
- 1934 – Bödeln (The Hangman) by Pär Lagerkvist (title role)
- 1934 – Hamlet by William Shakespeare (title role)
- 1931 – Glada änkan (The Merry Widow) by Franz Lehár (part: Count Danilo) (operetta)
- 1928 – Broadway by George Abbott (part: Roy Lane)
- 1927 – Så tuktas en argbigga (The Taming of the Shrew) by William Shakespeare (part: Petruchio)
- 1927 – Candida by George Bernard Shaw (part: Marchbanks)
- 1926 – Han som får örfilarna (He Who Gets Slapped) by Leonid Andreyev (leading role: HE)
- 1925 – Gösta Berlings saga (The Saga of Gosta Berling) by Selma Lagerlöf (reprise run; title role)
- 1924 – Graven (The Grave) by Paul Raynal
- 1923 – Gösta Berlings saga by Selma Lagerlöf (title role)
- 1923 – En herre i frack by André Picard (L'homme en habit)
- 1922 – Gustav Vasa by August Strindberg (part: Erik XIV)
- 192? – Kameliadamen (The Lady of the Camellias) by Alexandre Dumas
- 1919 – Romeo and Juliet by William Shakespeare (part: Romeo)
- 1916 – Gamla Heidelberg (Old Heidelberg) by W. Meyer-Förster
- 1915 – Lycko-Pers resa by August Strindberg
- 1914 – Svanevit by August Strindberg (part: The Prince)
- 1911 – Bröllopet på Ulfåsa (The Wedding at Ulfåsa) by Frans Hedberg (professional stage debut; part: Bengt Lagman)

== Sources ==
- Från Gösta Ekman till Gösta Ekman - En bok om Hasse, far och son (From Gösta Ekman to Gösta Ekman - A Book on Hasse, Father and Son) by Bengt Forslund; Bengt Forslund och Askild & Kärnekull Förlag AB, Malmö 1982 (Sweden).
- Det var en gång (Den tänkande August Vol. 1 & 2) by Gösta Ekman, Albert Bonnier, Stockholm, 1935 (photos).
