= Charles XII (film) =

1925 Swedish historical silent film

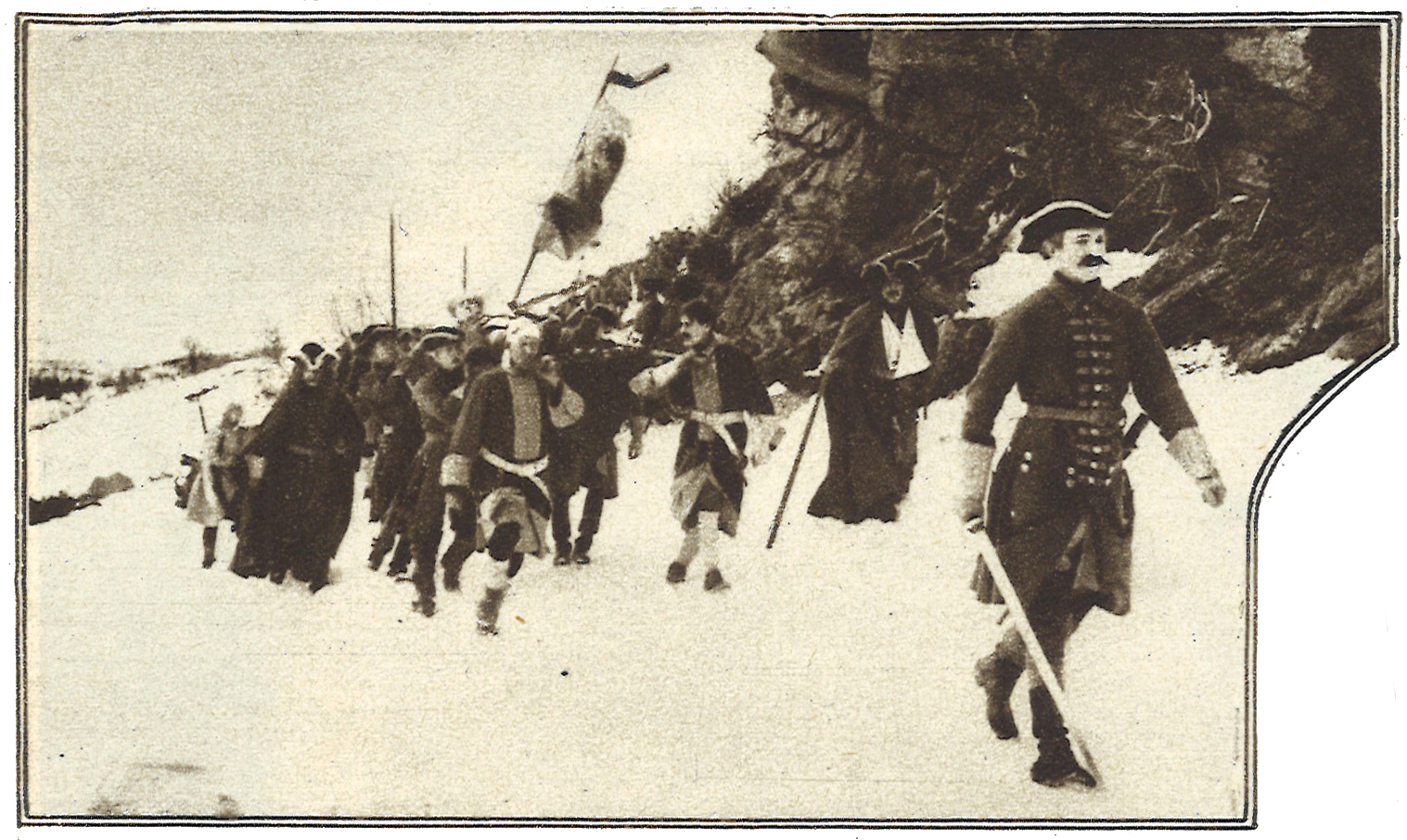
- Directed by: John W. Brunius
- Written by: Hjalmar Bergman
- Produced by: Herman Rasch
- Starring: Gösta Ekman; Bengt Djurberg; Augusta Lindberg; Mona Mårtenson
- Cinematography: Hugo Edlund
- Music by: Otto Trobäck
- Production company: Historisk Film
- Distributed by: Historisk Film
- Release dates: 2 February 1925 (part I); 16 November 1925 (part II)
- Running time: 6 hours
- Country: Sweden
- Languages: Silent; Swedish intertitles

Charles XII (Swedish: Karl XII) is a 1925 Swedish silent historical film directed by John W. Brunius and starring Gösta Ekman, Bengt Djurberg and Augusta Lindberg. Because of its long running time of nearly six hours, it was released in two separate parts. The film depicts the life of Charles XII of Sweden (1682-1718) who oversaw the expansion of the Swedish Empire until its defeat by the Russian army at the Battle of Poltava, the decisive battle of the Great Northern War. The film was the most expensive production in Swedish history when it was made, and inspired a string of large budget Swedish historical films.

== Cast ==
- Gösta Ekman as Karl XII
- Bengt Djurberg as Sven Björnberg
- Augusta Lindberg as Major Kerstin Ulfclou på Berga
- Mona Mårtenson as Anna Ulfclou
- Harry Roeck-Hansen as Erik Ulfclou, peasant
- Axel Lagerberg as Johan Ulfclou, theologian
- Paul Seelig as Bengt Ulfclou, lieutenant
- Palle Brunius as Lill-Lasse Ulfclou
- Tyra Dörum as Kajsa, maid at Berga
- Nicolai de Seversky as Tsar Peter I of Ryssland
- Pauline Brunius as Countess Aurora von Köningsmarck
- Tor Weijden as August II av Sachsen-Polen, a.k.a. August the Strong
- Einar Fröberg as Fredrik IV av Danmark
- Ragnar Billberg as Hans Küsel
- Märtha Lindlöf as Dowager Queen Hedvig Eleonora
- Åsa Törnekvist as Princess Hedvig Sofia
- Edit Rolf as Princess Ulrika Eleonora

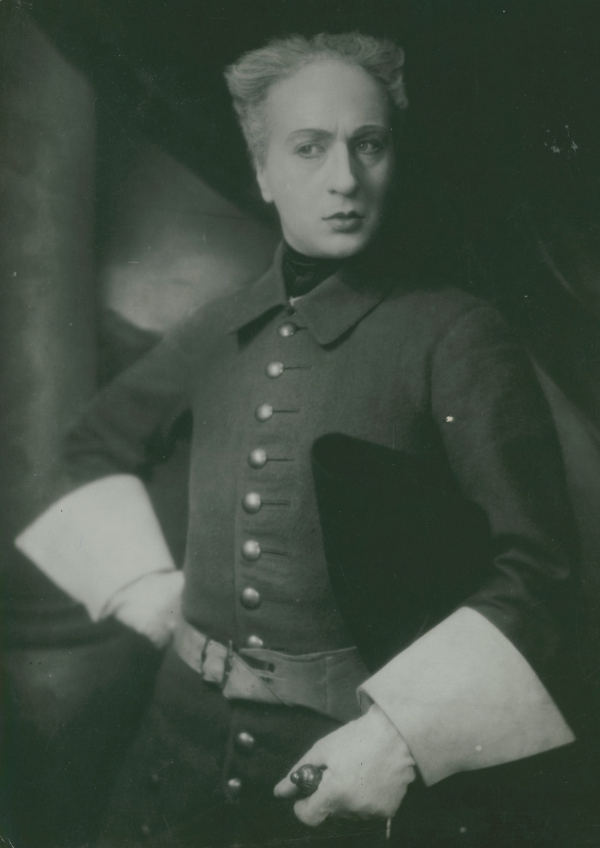
Gösta Ekman as Charles XII

== Bibliography ==
- Sundholm, John & Thorsen, Isak & Andersson, Lars Gustaf & Hedling, Olof & Iversen, Gunnar & Moller, Birgir Thor. Historical Dictionary of Scandinavian Cinema. Scarecrow Press, 2012.
