= Johan Ulfstjerna (1923 film) =

1923 film

- Directed by: John W. Brunius
- Written by: Carlo Keil-Möller
- Based on: Johan Ulfstjerna by Tor Hedberg
- Starring: Ivan Hedqvist; Anna Olin; Mary Johnson
- Cinematography: Hugo Edlund
- Production company: Svensk Filmindustri
- Distributed by: Svensk Filmindustri
- Release date: 3 December 1923
- Running time: 65 minutes
- Country: Sweden
- Languages: Silent; Swedish intertitles

Johan Ulfstjerna is a 1923 Swedish silent drama film directed by John W. Brunius and starring Ivan Hedqvist, Anna Olin and Mary Johnson. It was shot at the Råsunda Studios in Stockholm. The film's sets were designed by the art director Vilhelm Bryde. It was based on the 1907 Tor Hedberg play Johan Ulfstjerna, which was later remade as a 1936 sound film of the same title by Gustaf Edgren.

== Synopsis ==
The film takes place in Helsinki at the turn of the twentieth century when an underground resistance movement attempts to liberate Finland from the Russian Empire.

== Cast ==
- Ivan Hedqvist as John Ulfstjerna
- Anna Olin as Adelaide Ulfstjerna
- Einar Hanson as Helge Ulfstjerna
- Mary Johnson as Agda
- John Ekman as Governor
- Rudolf Wendbladh as Reback
- Albion Örtengren as Mr. Gauvin
- Ernst Brunman as Police Officer
- Anton De Verdier as Conspirator
- Bengt Djurberg as Conspirator
- Olle Hilding as Conspirator
- Berta Hillberg as Maid
- Gösta Hillberg as Secretary General
- Torsten Hillberg as Conspirator
- Axel Högel as Cinspirator
- Ollars-Erik Landberg as Conspirator
- Herman Lantz as Police Officer
- Nils Ohlin as Conspirator
- Sven Quick as Conspirator
- Paul Seelig as Conspirator

== Bibliography ==
- Sadoul, Georges. Dictionary of Film Makers. University of California Press, 1972.
