= Vilhelm Bryde =

Swedish actor, film producer and architect

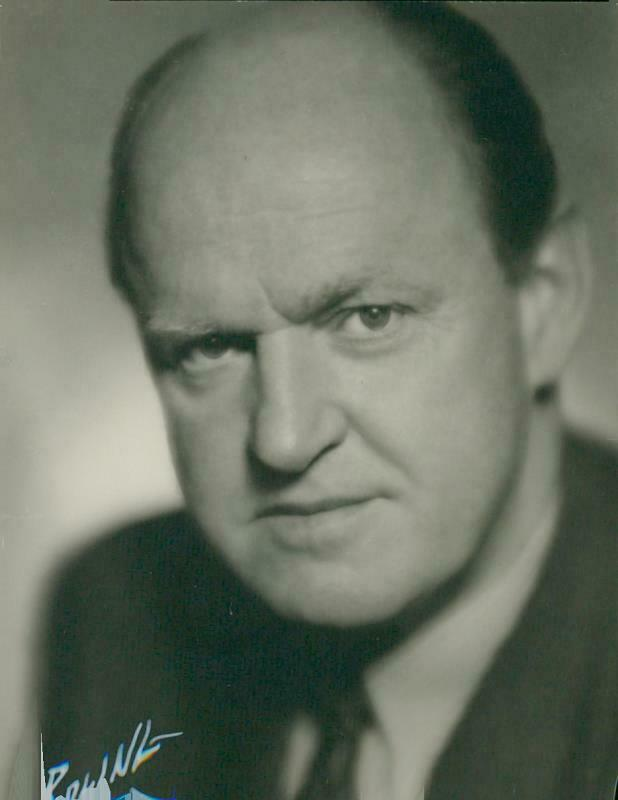
- Born: 8 April 1888; Stockholm, Sweden
- Died: 26 April 1974 (aged 86); Stockholm, Sweden
- Years active: 1920 - 1939 (film)

Vilhelm Bryde (8 April 1888 – 24 April 1974) was a Swedish actor, film producer, and art director.

== Biography ==
From 1909 to 1911, he was a student at the Royal Dramatic Theatre. Bryde was an actor at Svenska Teatern in Stockholm (1913-1919). He was director of the Svensk Filmindustri facilities at the Filmstaden (1922-1933). He worked on the 1924 Greta Garbo film The Saga of Gosta Berling, part-designing the forty eight sets constructed for Filmstaden at Råsunda for the production.

== Selected filmography ==
=== Art director ===
- Thora van Deken (1920)
- A Fortune Hunter (1921)
- Boman at the Exhibition (1923)
- Johan Ulfstjerna (1923)
- Charles XII's Courier (1924)
- The Saga of Gosta Berling (1924)
- Life in the Country (1924)
- Charles XII (1925)
- Where the Lighthouse Flashes (1924)
- 40 Skipper Street (1925)
- The Lady of the Camellias (1925)
- First Mate Karlsson's Sweethearts (1925)
- Ingmar's Inheritance (1925)
- Her Little Majesty (1925)
- A Sister of Six (1926)
- To the Orient (1926)
- She Is the Only One (1926)
- The Tales of Ensign Stål (1926)
- The Million Dollars (1926)
- The Rivals (1926)
- The Ghost Baron (1927)
- Sealed Lips (1927)
- Sin (1928)
- Jansson's Temptation (1928)
- Black Rudolf (1928)
- Say It with Music (1929)
- Artificial Svensson (1929)
- The Realm of the Rye (1929)
- Den starkaste (1929)
- Father and Son (1930)
- Cavaliers of the Crown (1930)
- Frida's Songs (1930)
- Ulla, My Ulla (1930)
- The People of Norrland (1930)
- The Red Day (1931)
- Flickan från Värmland (1931)
- The False Millionaire (1931)
- Colourful Pages (1931)

=== Director ===
- A Perfect Gentleman (1927)

=== Producer ===
- Sin (1928)
- The Triumph of the Heart (1929)
- Artificial Svensson (1929)
- Frida's Songs (1930)

== Bibliography ==
- Payne, Robert (2002) The Great Garbo ( New York City: Cooper Square Press) ISBN 0815412231
