= Olof Ås =

Swedish theater and film actor (1892–1948)

Olof Alvar Hage Ås (21 September 1892 – 4 September 1949) was a Swedish theater and film actor stage manager.

Ås was born in Stockholm, and begin his career on the stage. He then began a career in the 1910s as a stage manager. Some of his work as a stage manager includes films such as Victor Sjöström's The Lass from the Stormy Croft (Swedish: Tösen från Stormyrtorpet) (1917) and Mauritz Stiller's Gösta Berlings saga (1922), for which he also worked on special effects.

Ås made his film debut in the 1912 Paul Garbagni-directed I lifvets vår and would appear in nearly 30 films (most of them directed by either Stiller or Sjöström) until his death in Tureberg, Sollentuna Municipality, following a road accident, aged 56.

== Selected filmography ==
Year	Title	Role	Notes
1917	A Man There Was	Lookout	Uncredited
1917	Thomas Graals bästa film	Stage worker	
1917	Alexander den Store	One city bid	Uncredited
1918	The Outlaw and His Wife	Man with Bjrön Bergstéinsson	
1918	Thomas Graals bästa barn	Driver	
1919	Sons of Ingmar	Farm-Hand	Uncredited
1919	Sången om den eldröda blomman	Timber Raft Man	Uncredited
1919	His Lordship's Last Will (Hans nåds testamente)	Farmhand	
1920	Karin Daughter of Ingmar (Karin Ingmarsdotter)	Inspector	
1920	A Lover in Pawn (Mästerman)	Sailor	
1921	The Phantom Carriage (Körkarlen)	Driver	
1922	Vem dömer	man at the inn	Uncredited
1927	The Devil and the Smalander	Hjortberg	
1928	A.-B. gifta bort baron Olson	Jakob	
1929	Artificial Svensson	Officer	
1946	Harald Handfaste		Uncredited, (final film role)
