= Julius Jaenzon =

Swedish cinematographer (1885–1961)

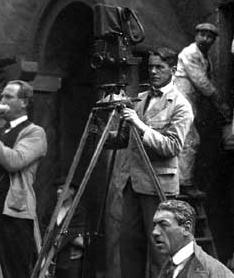
- Julius Jaenzon in 1921 together with Victor Sjöström (left) and Mauritz Stiller (bottom right).
- Born: 8 July 1885; Gothenburg, Sweden
- Died: 17 February 1961 (aged 75); Stockholm, Sweden
- Occupation: Cinematographer
- Years active: 1907–1948

Julius Jaenzon (8 July 1885 – 17 February 1961) was a Swedish cinematographer, essential in the early Swedish silent cinema. He is most known for his collaborations with directors Victor Sjöström and Mauritz Stiller, particularly in adaptions of novels by Selma Lagerlöf. Especially the accuracy with which he mastered the double exposure, for example in The Phantom Carriage, was much admired at the time.

== Early life ==
Julius Jaenzon was born in Gothenburg, Sweden on 8 July 1885.

== Legacy ==
He was portrayed by Carl Magnus Dellow in the 2000 television play The Image Makers.

== Selected filmography ==
- She Is the Only One (1926)
- To the Orient (1926)
- Say It with Music (1929)
- Cavaliers of the Crown (1930)
- Frida's Songs (1930)
- Colourful Pages (1931)
- Night Shift (1932)
- Mother-in-Law's Coming (1932)
- Marriageable Daughters (1933)
- Two Men and a Widow (1933)
- What Do Men Know? (1933)
- Man's Way with Women (1934)
- The People of Småland (1935)
- Ocean Breakers (1935)
- The Marriage Game (1935)
- Adventure (1936)
- The Wedding Trip (1936)
- Johan Ulfstjerna (1936)
- Conscientious Objector Adolf (1936)
- Sara Learns Manners (1937)
- Whalers (1939)
- Emilie Högquist (1939)
- One, But a Lion! (1940)
- With Open Arms (1940)
- Dunungen (1941)
- Bright Prospects (1941)
- Goransson's Boy (1941)
- Nothing Is Forgotten (1942)
- Katrina (1943)
- Jolanta the Elusive Pig (1945)
- Evening at the Djurgarden (1946)
- Life at Forsbyholm Manor (1948)
- Love and Deficit (1932)
- Father and Son (1930)
- Ulla, My Ulla (1930)
- Charlotte Löwensköld (1930)
- The Triumph of the Heart (1929)
- Parisiennes (1928)
- Sin (1928)
- Sealed Lips (1927)
- To the Orient (Till österland) (1926)
- Ingmar's Inheritance (1925)
- Life in the Country (1924)
- The Saga of Gosta Berling (Gösta Berlings saga) (1924)
- The Blizzard (Gunnar Hedes saga) (1923)
- Carousel (1923)
- Love's Crucible (Vem dömer) (1922)
- The Phantom Carriage (Körkarlen) (1921)
- A Lover in Pawn (Mästerman) (1920)
- Sir Arne's Treasure (Herr Arnes pengar) (1919)
- Sons of Ingmar (Ingmarssönerna) (1919)
- The Outlaw and His Wife (Berg-Ejvind och hans hustru) (1918)
- A Man There Was (Terje Vigen) (1917)
- The Wings (Vingarne) (1916)
- Kiss of Death (Dödskyssen) (1916)
