= The Lass from the Stormy Croft =

- Directed by: Victor Sjöström
- Screenplay by: Ester Julin; Victor Sjöström
- Based on: The Girl from the Marsh Croft by Selma Lagerlöf
- Produced by: Charles Magnusson
- Cinematography: Henrik Jaenzon
- Release date: 10 September 1917
- Running time: 87 minutes
- Country: Sweden
- Languages: Silent, Swedish intertitles

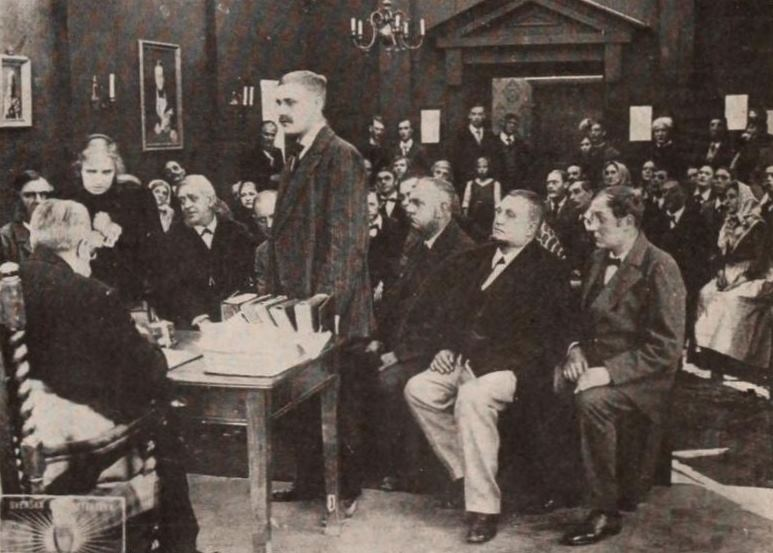
Film still

The Lass from the Stormy Croft (Swedish: Tösen från Stormyrtorpet) is a 1917 silent Swedish drama film directed by Victor Sjöström. It is based on the 1908 novella with the same title by Swedish author Selma Lagerlöf, the first woman to win the Nobel Prize in Literature. It was the first in a series of successful Lagerlöf adaptions by Sjöström, made possible by a deal between Lagerlöf and A-B Svenska Biografteatern (later AB Svensk Filmindustri) to adapt at least one Lagerlöf novel each year. Lagerlöf had for many years denied any proposal to let her novels be adapted for film, but after seeing Sjöström's Terje Vigen she finally decided to give her consent.

It was originally released in the US as The Girl from the March Croft and the UK as The Woman He Chose. However it is today generally referred to as The Lass from the Stormy Croft, which is closer to the original Swedish title. Six other adaptions of the same novel have been made, a German and a Turkish in 1935, a Finnish in 1940, another Swedish in 1947, a Danish (Husmandstøsen) in 1952 and another German in 1958.

== Plot ==
As described in a film magazine (with English names), Helga, the girl from the Marsh Croft, appears in court against Peter Martenson, the father of her child, but withdraws her charge when he is about to perjure himself. This wins the admiration of Gudmund Erlandson, who persuades his parents to take the disgraced young woman into their home as a servant. Gudmund becomes engaged to Hildur, the daughter of a wealthy neighbor, but then is involved in a drunken orgy where a man is murdered. Believing himself guilty, he confesses on his wedding morn, and Hildur turns from him. Helga, having proof of his innocence, seeks to reunite the couple before she proves it. However, during this crisis Gudmund discovers that it is Helga that he loves. When his innocence is established, it is she whom he marries.

== Cast ==
- Greta Almroth as Helga Nilsdotter
- William Larsson as Helga's Father
- Thekla Borgh as Helga's Mother
- Lars Hanson as Gudmund Erlandsson
- Hjalmar Selander as Erland Erlandsson
- Concordia Selander as Ingeborg Erlandsson
- Karin Molander as Hildur Persson
- Georg Blomstedt as Erik Persson
- Jenny Tschernichin-Larsson as Hildur's Mother
- Gösta Cederlund as Per Mårtensson
- Edla Rothgardt as Mrs. Mårtensson
- Nils Ahrén as Judge
