= Tösen från Stormyrtorpet =

Tösen från Stormyrtorpet may refer to:

- The Lass from the Stormy Croft, a 1917 Swedish drama film
- Tösen från Stormyrtorpet (1947 film), a Swedish drama film

== See also ==
- The Girl from the Marsh Croft (disambiguation)
