= Sjöström =

Sjöström is a Swedish surname. Notable people with the surname include:

- Anna Sjöström (born 1977), Swedish footballer
- Axel Gabriel Sjöström (1794–1846), Finnish Romantic poet
- Einar Sjöström (1882–1923), Finnish architect, brother of Wilho
- Elin Sjöström (1851–1936), Finnish writer
- Erica Sjöström (born 1970), Swedish singer and saxophonist
- Frans Anatolius Sjöström (1840–1885), Finnish architect
- Freddie Stroma (born 1987) (né Sjöström), British actor
- Fredrik Sjöström (born 1983), Swedish ice hockey player
- Gullbrand Sjöström (born 1926), Swedish javelin thrower
- Harri Sjöström (born 1952), Finnish saxophonist
- Henning Sjöström (1922–2011), Swedish lawyer
- Janne Sjöström (1948–2013), Swedish footballer and manager
- Joacim Sjöström (born 1964), Swedish footballer
- Juhani Sjöström (1871–1909), Finnish writer
- Maja Sjöström (1868–1961), Swedish artist
- Monia Sjöström (born 1973), Musical artist
- Nell Sjöström (1933–2021), Swedish sprinter
- Olof Adolf Sjöström (1841–1896), Swedish-American fraudster
- Phyllis Sjöström (1888–1964), British-Finnish soprano singer
- Sarah Sjöström (born 1993), Swedish swimmer
- Stefan Sjöström (born 1945), Swedish sailor
- Tomas Sjöström (born 2000), economist
- Victor Sjöström (1879–1960), Swedish film director, screenwriter and actor
- Wilho Sjöström (1873–1944), Finnish artist, brother of Einar
