= Tore Svennberg =

Swedish actor

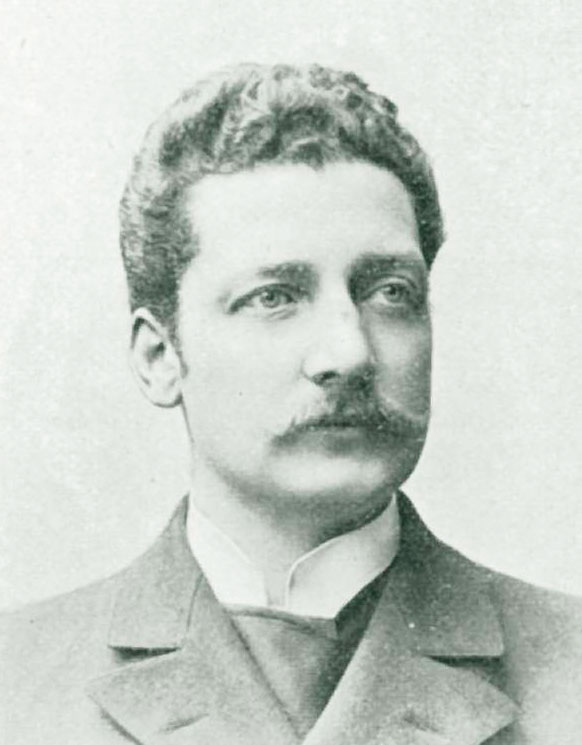
- Tore Svennberg, c. before 1898
- Born: Olof Teodor Svennberg; 28 February 1858; Stockholm, Sweden
- Died: 8 May 1941 (aged 83); Stockholm, Sweden
- Occupations: Actor, director
- Years active: 1877–1940
- Spouse: Karin Wiberg (1905 – 1941; his death)

Olof Teodor "Tore" Svennberg (28 February 1858 – 8 May 1941) was a Swedish actor and theatre director whose career spanned more than five decades.

== Biography ==
Born in Stockholm, Tore Svennberg made his stage debut at the Folkan Theatre in his hometown in 1877. From 1878 to 1891 he was engaged with various national touring theatre companies with actress Julia Håkansson and was from time to time cast by Swedish stage director Albert Ranft. At the Swedish Theatre, he played in several August Strindberg dramas: Gustav Vasa, starred in Erik XIV in 1899, A Dream Play in 1907 and The Dance of Death in 1919. He also appeared in many roles by Henrik Ibsen: as Helmer in A Doll's House in 1889, as Hjalmar Ekdahl in The Wild Duck in 1891 and as Borkman in John Gabriel Borkman in 1897.

In 1920 Svennberg was engaged at the Swedish Royal Dramatic Theatre, where he later became director from 1922 to 1928. He managed to attract audiences by focusing on classics and foreign plays.

Svennberg also appeared in a number of films, beginning in the Victor Sjöström-directed 1919 drama Sons of Ingmar, based on the novel Jerusalem by Selma Lagerlöf, and performed in his last film role at the age of 82 in Per Lindberg's 1940 drama Stål. He is possibly best recalled internationally for his role as Magnus Barring in the 1938 film A Woman's Face opposite actress Ingrid Bergman.

== Selected filmography ==
- Sons of Ingmar (1919)
- The Monastery of Sendomir (1920)
- The Phantom Carriage (1921)
- A Wild Bird (1921)
- Say It with Music (1929)
- Frida's Songs (1930)
- What Do Men Know? (1933)
- Ocean Breakers (1935)
- A Woman's Face (1938)

== Personal life ==
Tore Svennberg was married in 1905 to actress Karin Wiberg.
