= Ingmar's Inheritance =

1925 film

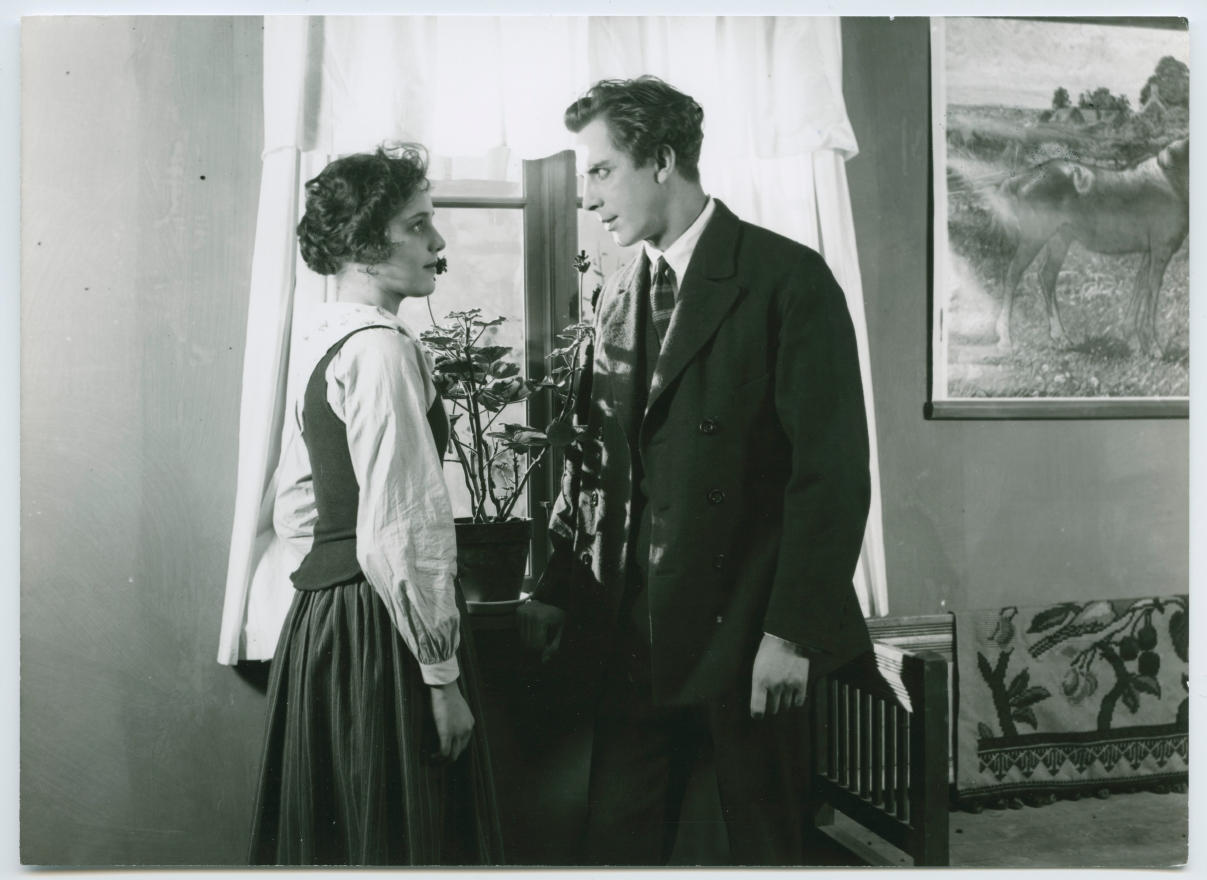
- Lars Hanson and Mona Mårtenson
- Directed by: Gustaf Molander
- Written by: Ragnar Hyltén-Cavallius; Gustaf Molander
- Based on: Jerusalem by Selma Lagerlöf
- Produced by: Oscar Hemberg
- Starring: Lars Hanson; Conrad Veidt; John Ekman
- Cinematography: Åke Dahlqvist; Julius Jaenzon
- Music by: Heimer Alexandersson; Oskar Linberg; Eric Westberg
- Production company: Nord-Westi Film
- Distributed by: Svenska Biografteaterns Filmbyrå
- Release date: December 1925
- Running time: 92 minutes
- Country: Sweden
- Languages: Silent; Swedish intertitles

Ingmar's Inheritance (Swedish: Ingmarsarvet) is a 1925 Swedish silent drama film directed and co-written by Gustaf Molander and starring Lars Hanson, Conrad Veidt and John Ekman. It was shot at the Råsunda Studios in Stockholm and on location in Dalarna. The film's sets were designed by the art director Vilhelm Bryde. Based on the first (1901) of a two-part novel by Selma Lagerlöf, the film was followed by a sequel, To the Orient, in 1926.

== Cast ==
- Märta Halldén as Karin Ingmarsdotter
- Ivan Hedqvist as Stark-Anders
- John Ekman as Elias
- Lars Hanson as Ingmar Ingmarsson
- Mathias Taube as Halfvor
- Mona Mårtenson as Gertrud Storm
- Nils Aréhn as Schoolmaster Storm
- Conrad Veidt as Hellgum
- Ida Brander as Storms wife
- Knut Lindroth as Berger Sven Person
- Jenny Hasselqvist as Barbro Persdotter
- Harry Ahlin as Boy in youth circle
- Ellen Appelberg as Helgum's wife
- Erik Bergman as en av Eljas supbröder
- Georg Blomstedt as en av Eljas supbröder
- Albert Christiansen as Boy in the lifeboat
- Märta Ekström as Girl in youth circle
- Louise Eneman-Wahlberg as Woman in the lifeboat
- Gösta Ericsson as Boy in youth circle
- Mignon Georgian as Wedding guest
- Hjördis Gille as Woman in Mission House / Helgumian
- Justus Hagman as Man in Mission House / Helgumian
- Thure Holm as Man at auction
- Nils Jacobsson as Boy in youth circle
- Axel Janse as Helgumian
- Axel Lagerberg as Man in lifeboat
- Herman Lantz as Hunter
- Märtha Lindlöf as passenger at L'Univers
- Richard Lindström as Man in Mission House / Helgumian
- Tore Lindwall as Boy in youth circle
- Arne Lundh as Ingmar as a child
- Gunnar Maegerstolpe as passenger at L'Univers
- Nils Ohlin as Groom
- Lotten Olsson as Older woman in lifeboat
- Sven Quick as Man in Mission House / Helgumian
- Gösta Richter as Bertil
- Alf Sjöberg as young man in the mission house / Helgumian
- Valborg Svensson as Girl in youth circle
- Harald Wehlnor as Man in Mission House / Helgumian
- Albion Örtengren as Pastor
- Emmy Albiin as Helgumian
- Gabriel Alw as Christ
- Josua Bengtson as Man at auction
- Sven Bergvall as Passenger
- Hugo Björne as Captain of 'L'Univers'
- Carl Browallius as Ingmar's father
- Bengt Djurberg as Gunhild's brother
- Gösta Gustafson as Helgumian
- Axel Högel as Man at auction
- Lisskulla Jobs as Helgumian
- Lili Lani as Gunhild
- Anna Lindahl as Drowning woman
- Sten Lindgren as Gunhilds second brother
- Alfred Lundberg as Gunhilds husband
- Edla Rothgardt as Helgumian
- Hugo Rönnblad as Storm
- Wilhelm Tunelli as Vicar Dagson

== Bibliography ==
- Mette Hjort & Ursula Lindqvist. A Companion to Nordic Cinema. John Wiley & Sons, 2016.
