= Judge Not =

Judge Not may refer to:

- "Judge Not" (song), a single by Bob Marley
- Judge Not (1914 film), a 1914 Swedish film directed by Victor Sjöström
- Judge Not (1920 film), a 1920 British silent drama film
- Judge Not; or The Woman of Mona Diggings, a 1915 film starring Harry Carey

== See also ==
- Judge not lest ye be judged
