= Karin, Daughter of Ingmar =

1920 film

- Directed by: Victor Sjöström
- Written by: Screenplay: Ester Julin; Victor Sjöström; Novel: Selma Lagerlöf
- Starring: Victor Sjöström; Tora Teje
- Cinematography: Gustaf Bode; Henrik Jaenzon
- Release date: 2 February 1920
- Running time: 115 minutes
- Country: Sweden
- Language: Silent with Swedish intertitles

Karin, Daughter of Ingmar (Swedish: Karin Ingmarsdotter), also released in the United Kingdom under the title God's Way, is a 1920 Swedish silent drama film directed by Victor Sjöström. It is the second part in Sjöström's large-scale adaption of Selma Lagerlöf's novel Jerusalem, following Sons of Ingmar from the year before, and depicting chapter three and four from the novel. The critical reception of the film was, however, unenthusiastic, and Sjöström decided to not direct any more parts. Eventually the suite was finished by Gustaf Molander in 1926.

== Cast ==
- Victor Sjöström as Ingmar
- Tora Teje as Karin Ingmarsdotter
- Bertil Malmstedt as Lill-Ingmar
- Tor Weijden as Halfvor
- Nils Lundell as Eljas Elof Ersson
- Carl Browallius as Eljas' father
- Josua Bengtsson as Eljas' friend
- Nils Ahrén as Berger Sven Persson
- Olof Ås as Inspector
- Eric Gustafson as Innkeeper's Son
- Emil Fjellström as Stark-Ingmar
- Paul Hallström
