= Fjalla-Eyvindur =

Icelandic outlaw

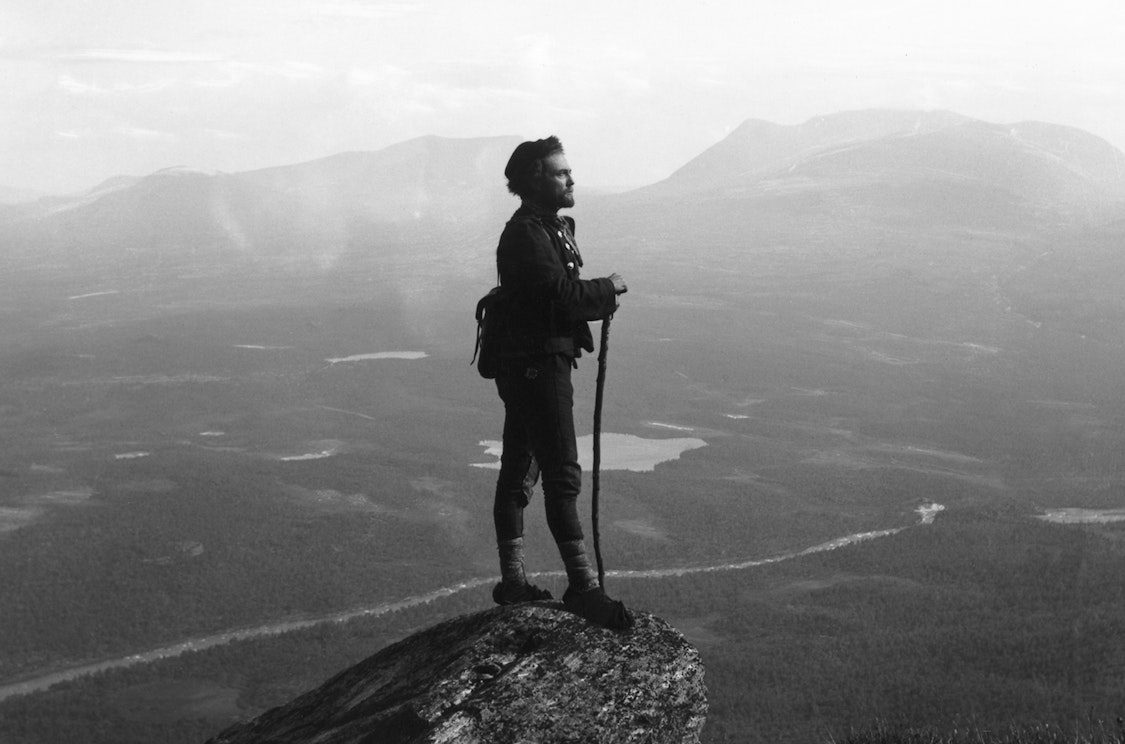
Victor Sjöström as Fjalla-Eyvindur in the 1918 film The Outlaw and His Wife.

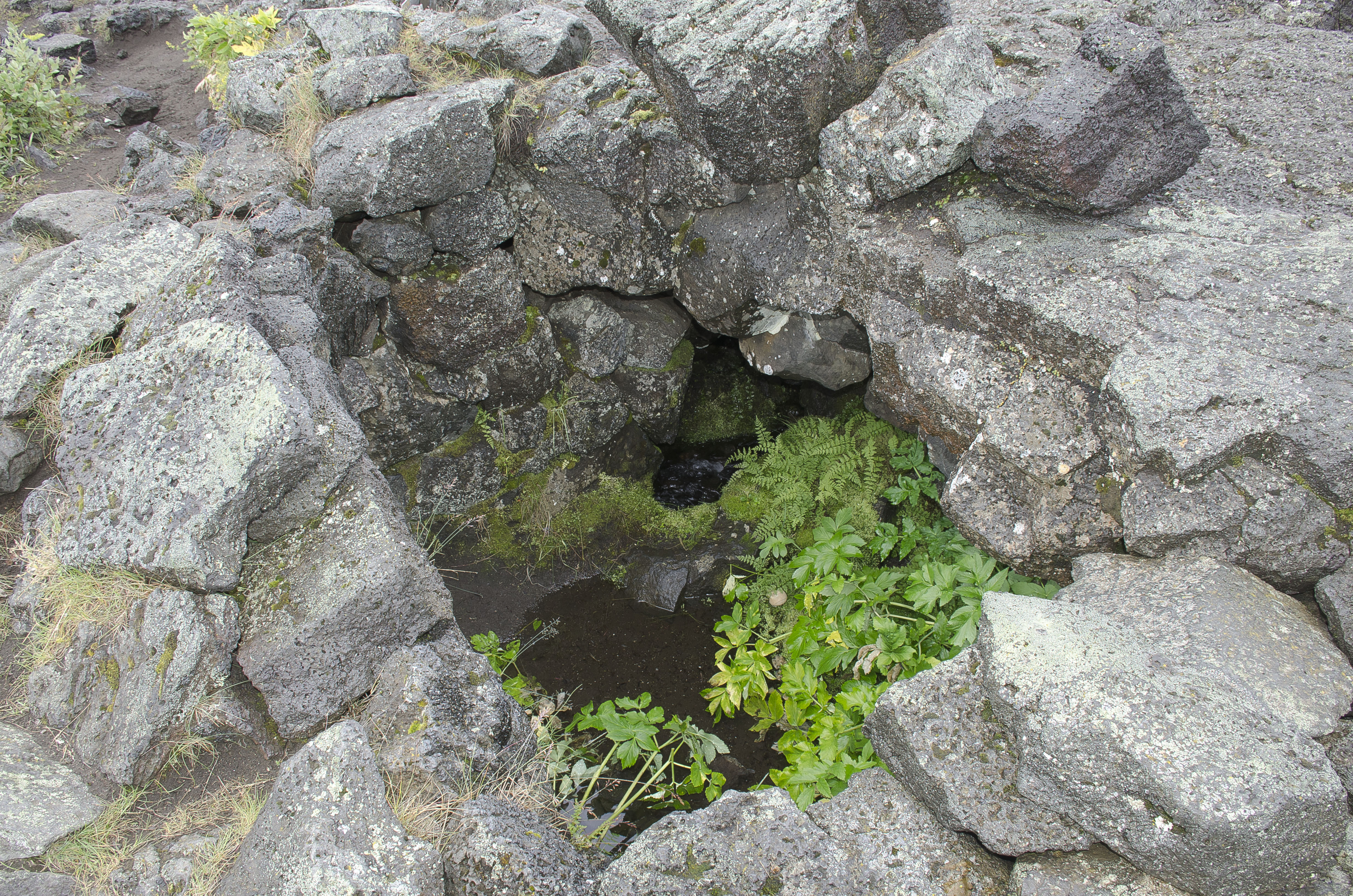
Shelter of Fjalla-Eyvindur at Herðubreiðarlindir

Fjalla-Eyvindur (Icelandic: Eyvindur of the Mountains; c. 1714 – c. 1783) was an Icelandic outlaw. He and his wife Halla are reported to have fled into the remote highlands of Iceland after 1760. They lived in the wilderness for 20 years. A hot spring named Eyvindarhver is named after him.

The Icelandic playwright Jóhann Sigurjónsson dramatised his life in 1911 as Fjalla-Eyvindur. This play contains the lullaby "Sofðu unga ástin mín", still used by many Icelandic parents. In 1918, the play was made into the Swedish film The Outlaw and His Wife, directed by Victor Sjöström.
