= The Devil and the Smalander =

The Devil and the Smalander may refer to:

- The Devil and the Smalander (1927 film), Swedish silent film
- The Devil and the Smalander (1949 film), Swedish film
