= Where the Lighthouse Flashes =

1924 film

- Directed by: Ivar Kåge
- Written by: Ester Julin
- Starring: Gösta Hillberg; Ester Julin; Edvin Adolphson
- Cinematography: Sven Bardach
- Production company: Svensk Örnfilm
- Distributed by: Svenska Filmkompaniet
- Release date: 17 November 1924
- Running time: 88 minutes
- Country: Sweden
- Languages: Silent; Swedish intertitles

Where the Lighthouse Flashes (Swedish: Där fyren blinkar) is a 1924 Swedish silent drama film directed by Ivar Kåge and starring Gösta Hillberg, Ester Julin and Edvin Adolphson. It was shot at the Råsunda Studios in Stockholm. The film's sets were designed by the art director Vilhelm Bryde.

== Cast ==
- Gösta Hillberg as Lang
- Ester Julin as Mrs. Lang
- Svea Frisch-Kåge as Marja
- Edvin Adolphson as Fritiof
- Ivar Kåge as Rickhard Henning
- Manne Göthson as Lundgren
- Magda Holm as Blenda
- Nicke Liedfeld as Kruuse
- Josua Bengtson as Napoleon Roos
- Tore Lindwall as Bertil Roos, the son
- Albert Eriksson as Nisse
- Sven Hasselström as Captain Davidsson
- Tom Walter as Boy
- Torsten Winge as Principal Speaker
- Olle Åhlund as Kicke

== Bibliography ==
- Larsson, Mariah & Marklund, Anders. Swedish Film: An Introduction and Reader. Nordic Academic Press, 2010.
