= To the Orient =

1926 film

- Directed by: Gustaf Molander
- Written by: Ragnar Hyltén-Cavallius; Gustaf Molander
- Based on: Jerusalem by Selma Lagerlöf
- Produced by: Oscar Hemberg
- Starring: Lars Hanson; Jenny Hasselqvist; Mona Mårtenson
- Cinematography: Julius Jaenzon; Carl-Axel Söderström
- Production company: Nord-Westi Film
- Distributed by: Svenska Biografteaterns Filmbyrå; UFA (Germany)
- Release date: 1 February 1926
- Running time: 94 minutes
- Country: Sweden
- Languages: Silent; Swedish intertitles

To the Orient (Swedish: Till österland) is a 1926 Swedish silent drama film directed as well as co-written by Gustaf Molander and starring Lars Hanson, Jenny Hasselqvist and Mona Mårtenson. It was shot at the Råsunda Studios in Stockholm and on location in Jaffa and Jerusalem in Mandatory Palestine. The film's sets were designed by the art director Vilhelm Bryde. Based on the 1901-02 novel Jerusalem by Selma Lagerlöf, it is the sequel to the 1925 film Ingmar's Inheritance.

== Cast ==
- Lars Hanson as Ingmar
- Jenny Hasselqvist as Barbro
- Mona Mårtenson as Gertrud
- Harald Schwenzen as Gabriel Mattson
- Ivan Hedqvist as Stark-Anders
- Gabriel Alw as Nameless Messiah
- Edvin Adolphson as Stig Börjesson
- Nils Aréhn as Teacher
- Ida Brander as Skolmästarns hustru
- Knut Lindroth as Sven Persson

== Bibliography ==
- Larsson, Mariah & Marklund, Anders. Swedish Film: An Introduction and Reader. Nordic Academic Press, 2010.
- Qvist, Per Olov & von Bagh, Peter. Guide to the Cinema of Sweden and Finland. Greenwood Publishing Group, 2000.
