= Charles Magnusson =

Swedish film producer (1878–1948)

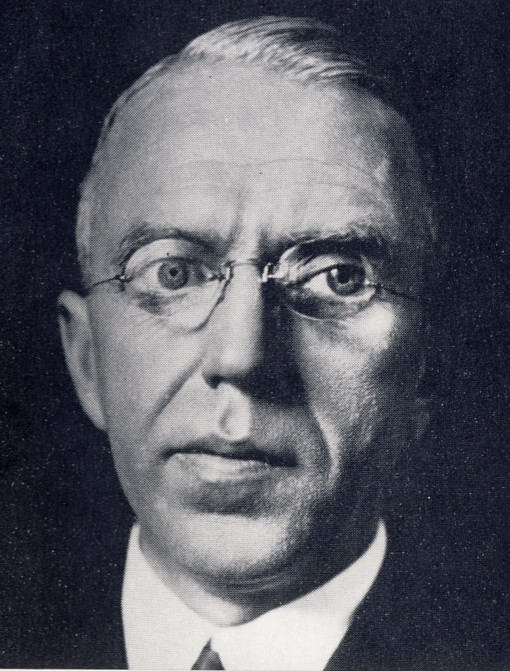
- Born: 26 January 1878; Gothenburg, Sweden
- Died: 18 January 1948 (aged 69); Stockholm, Sweden
- Occupations: Film producer Film director Screenwriter
- Years active: 1907–1928

Charles Magnusson (26 January 1878 – 18 January 1948) was a Swedish film producer and screenwriter.

== Career ==
In 1894, Magnusson's job was a professional photographer in Sweden and in 1905 he changed careers to be newsreel camera operator. By 1907, Magnusson found the Swedish Cinematographic Society. He was then hired in 1909 by Svenska Biografteatern, the first Swedish studio, as a general manager. The first film he was part of was released in 1909 by the name Varmlanningarne. Svenska Biografteatern was originally in Kristianstad until 1911 when they moved to Stockholm. Under Svenska Biografteatern, Magnusson hired Victor Sjostrom and Mauritz Stiller as directors in 1912. After, Magnusson was promoted to production chief in 1919 and remained in that position until 1928 when he retired.

== Produced films ==
- Varmlanningarne - 1909
- Spiskroksvalen - 1909
- Sjorovaren - 1909
- Fiskarvals fran Bohuslan - 1909
- Nar jag var Prins Utav Arkadien - 1909
- Nattmarschen i Sankt Eriks Grand - 1909
- Minnen fran Bostonklubben (Memories from the Boston Club) - 1909
- Brollopet pa Ulfasa - 1909
- Fanrik Stals Sagner - 1909
- Faderulla - 1910
- ur Goteborgssystemet I - 1910
- Pick Me Up, ur Flickorna Jackson - 1910
- Nu gar jag till Maxim - 1910
- Entres angen, ur Dollarprinsessan - 1910
- Urfeus i underjjorden (Orpheus in the Underworld) - 1910
- Jarnbararen (Iron Carrier) - 1911
- Sjomansdansen - 1911
- Amuletten (The Talisman) - 1911
- Det grona halsbandet (The Green Necklace) - 1912
- Samhallets dom (The Justice of Society) -1912
- Kolingens galoscher - 1912
- Tva Svenska emigranters aventyr i Amerika (The Adventures of Two Swedish Emigrants in America) - 1912
- Branningar, eller Stulen lycka - 1912
- De svarta maskerna (The Black Masks) - 1912
- Dodshoppet farn circkuskupolen -1912
- Mor och dotter (Mother and Daughter) - 1912
- Tradgardsmastaren (The Gardener) - 1912
- Ett hemligt giftermal (A Secret Marriage) - 1912
- I livets var, eller Forsta alskarinnan (In the Spring of Life, or His First Love) - 1912
- Den tryanniske fastmannen (The Tyrannical Fiancee) - 1912
- Skandalen (Scandal) - 1912
- Vampyren (Vampire) - 1912
- En sommarsaga (A Summer Tale) - 1912
- Barnet (The Child) - 1912
- Lojen och tarar (Ridicule and Tears) - 1913
- Nar karleken dodar (When Love Kills) - 1913
- Lady Marions sommarflirt (Lady Marion's Summer Flirtation) - 1913
- Ingeborg Holm (Give Us This Day) - 1913
- Gransfolken (The Border Feud) - 1913
- Miraklet (The Miracle) - 1913
- Halvblod (Halfbreed) - 1913
- Prasten (The Priest) - 1914
- Strejken (Strike) - 1914
- Stormfageln (The Stormy Petrel) - 1914
- Gatans barn (Children of the Street) - 1914
- Det roda tornet (The Master) - 1914
- Hogfjallets dotter(Daughter of the Mountains) - 1914
- Madame de Thebes - 1915
- Hans brollopsnatt (His Wedding Night) - 1915
- Rosen pa Tistelon (The Rose of Thistle Island) - 1916
- Karlek och journalistik (Love and the Journalist) - 1916
- Vingarna (The Wings) - 1916
- Therese - 1916
- Den levande mumien (The Living Mummy) - 1916
- Vem Skot (Tallroth) - 1916
- Balettprimadonnan (Anjuta, the Dancer) - 1916
- Terje vigen (A Man There Was) - 1917
- Thomas Graals basta film (Thomas Graal's Best Picture) - 1917
- Tosen fran stormyrtorpet (The Lass from the Stormy Croft) - 1918
- Berg-Ejvind och hans hustru (The Outlaw and His Wife) - 1918
- Thomas Graals basta barn (Thomas Graal's Best Child) - 1918
- Sangen om den eldroda blomman (Song of the Scarlet Flower) - 1918
- Ingmarssonerna (Sons of Ingmar) - 1919
- Dunungen (The Downey Girl) - 1919
- Herr Arnes pengar (Sir Arne's Treasure) - 1919
- Hans nads testamente (The Will of His Grace) - 1919
- Fiskebyn (The Fishing Village) - 1919
- Klostret it sendomir (The Monastery of Sendomir) - 1920
- Karin Ingmarsdotter (Karin, Daughter of Ingmar) -1920
- Masterman (Master Samuel) - 1920
- Prastankan (The Parson's Widow) - 1920
- Guyrkoviscarna - 1920
- Familijens traditioner - 1920
- Carollina Rediviva - 1920
- Erotikon - 1920
- Johan - 1920
- Korkarlen (The Phantom Chariot) - 1921
- Vallfarten till Kevlar (Pilgrimage to Kevlar) - 1921
- Kvarnen - 1921
- Hogre andamal - 1921
- De landsflyktiga (The Exiles) - 1921
- En vildfagel - 1921
- Vem domer (Love's Crucible) - 1922
- Det omrigade huset (The Surrounded House) - 1922
- Gunnar Hedes Saga (Gunnar Hede's Saga) - 1922
- Eld ombord (The Tragic Ship) - 1923
- Harda viljor - 1923
- Johan Ulfstjerna - 1923
- Malarpirater (Pirates on Lake Malar) - 1923
- Karusellen - 1923
- Boman pa utstallningen - 1923
- Gosta Berlings Saga (Gosta Berling's Saga) - 1923
- En piga blad pigor - 1924
- Ingmarsarvet (The Ingmar Inheritance) - 1925
- Till Osterland (To the Orient) - 1926

== Selected filmography ==
- Laughter and Tears (1913)
- The Lass from the Stormy Croft (1917)
- Terje Vigen (1917)
- The Outlaw and His Wife (1918)
- Sons of Ingmar (1919)
- His Lordship's Last Will (1919)
- The Phantom Carriage (1921)
- The Blizzard (1923)
