= Jóhann Sigurjónsson =

Icelandic playwright and poet

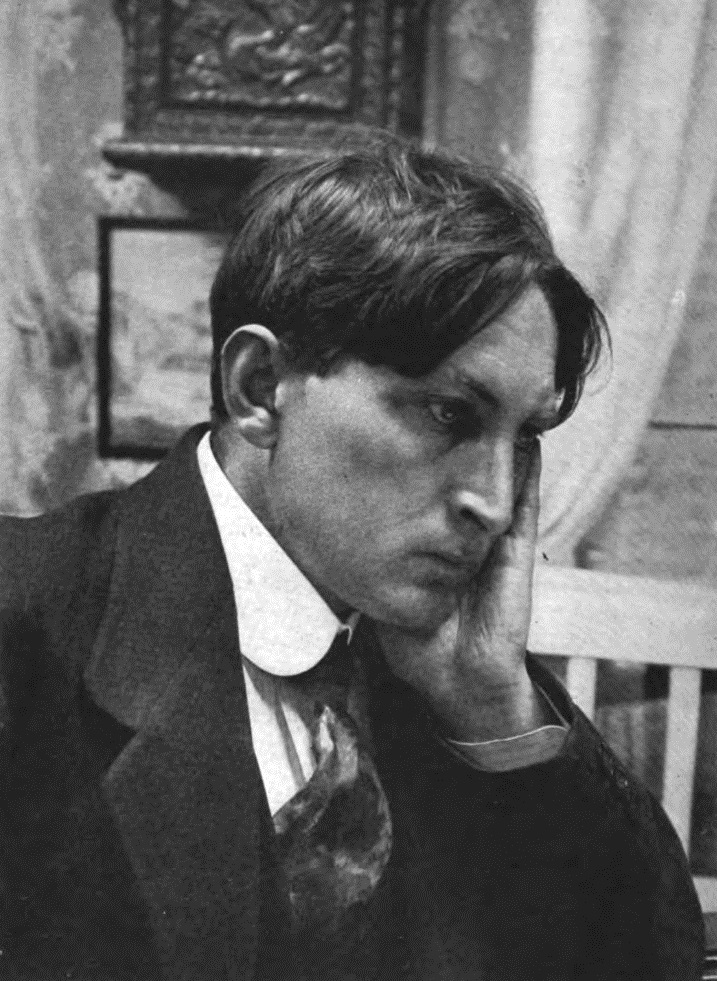
Jóhann Sigurjónsson in 1916

Jóhann Sigurjónsson (June 19, 1880 – August 31, 1919) was an Icelandic playwright and poet. Atypically, Jóhann wrote plays and poetry in both his native Icelandic and in Danish.

== Biography ==
Jóhann was the son of an Icelandic farmer and was born in Laxamýri, Iceland. In 1899 he emigrated to Denmark to study at The Royal Danish Veterinary and Agricultural University, but abandoned his studies in 1902 to devote himself to literature. During this period, he came under the influence of the Danish writer Georg Brandes and the philosophy of Friedrich Nietzsche.

He is probably best known for his play Fjalla-Eyvindur (Danish: Bjærg-Ejvind og hans hustru, English: Eyvindur of the Mountains), which was first published in 1911. The play was a success in Germany and Scandinavia and was also produced in the United States. It was cinematised by Victor Sjöström in 1918 as The Outlaw and His Wife. The play is based on an Icelandic folk tale about a notorious outlaw.

He also wrote a Nietzschean-Faustian tragedy called Galdra-Loftur (Danish: Ønsket, English: The Wish or Loftur the Sorcerer). It tells the story of an ambitious young scholar who dabbles in sorcery to acquire knowledge and power.

Jóhann died of tuberculosis in Copenhagen at the age of 39.
