= Life in the Country =

Life in the Country may refer to:

- Life in the Country (1943 film), a Swedish historical comedy film
- Life in the Country (1924 film), a Swedish silent drama film
