= A Man There Was =

1917 film by Victor Sjöström

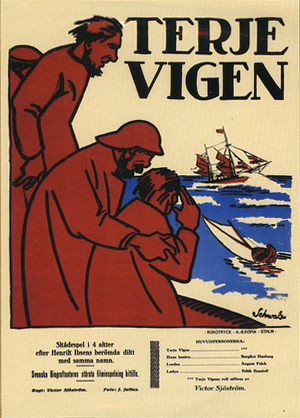
- Directed by: Victor Sjöström
- Written by: Gustaf Molander; Victor Sjöström
- Based on: Terje Vigen by Henrik Ibsen
- Produced by: Charles Magnusson
- Starring: Victor Sjöström
- Cinematography: Julius Jaenzon
- Production company: Svenska Biografteatern
- Distributed by: Svenska Biografteatern
- Release date: 29 January 1917
- Running time: 65 minutes
- Country: Sweden
- Language: Silent film
- Budget: 60,000 SEK

A Man There Was (Swedish: Terje Vigen) is a 1917 silent Swedish drama co-written and directed by Victor Sjöström, based on a poem of the same title by Henrik Ibsen. With a budget of SEK 60,000, it was the most expensive Swedish film made up to that point, marking a new direction in Swedish cinema with more funding to fewer films, resulting in better overall quality.

This film is considered to be the start of the golden age of Swedish silent film that would end after Gösta Berlings Saga in 1925, although films such as Ingeborg Holm (1913) are often assigned to this era as well.

== Plot ==
A Man There Was (1917)

Terje Vigen lives happily with his wife and little girl on a small island in Norway. In 1809, during the height of the Napoleonic Wars, the island is under a British naval blockade. Terje decides to row to Denmark to bring food to his family, but on the way back he is captured by a British ship and sent as a prisoner of war in England. When the war ends and he is finally freed, Terje finds that his wife and daughter have died. He takes up a solitary life in his house overlooking the sea. One night he sees a British yacht in distress in a storm. He rushes to her help and discovers that the yacht's captain is the same officer that had taken him prisoner many years ago. He decides against vengeance and rescues the captain along with his wife and child.

== Cast ==
- Victor Sjöström as Terje Vigen
- Edith Erastoff as The Lady
- August Falck as The Lord
- Bergliot Husberg as Mrs. Vigen

== Production ==
In Grimstad, Norway, while working at a pharmacy, Henrik Ibsen would often listen to the stories of the Norse maritime pilots. He became a close friend to one of the oldest and most experienced pilots, who had lived a remarkable life and had exciting stories to tell the young writer. His name was Svend Hanssen Haaø, from the island of Haaø (in modern Norwegian Håøya). The story of his life is often thought to be an important source for Ibsen when he wrote his poem Terje Vigen.

Svend Hanssen Haaø's life contains many of the essential elements of the story of Terje Vigen. Haaø made several trips by rowboat to Denmark through the British blockade, in the years 1807–14, to smuggle food back to his family and friends in Grimstad. The British captured him as many as four times, and some of his crew were put in prison in England as in the poem.

Formerly, very reserved about the possibilities of adapting Henrik Ibsen's works to the screen, "Victor Sjostrom did not see how the style of the Norwegian author could be reconciled with the prevailing fashion for comedies and thrillers." Consequently, he did not immediately accede to the wishes expressed by Charles Magnusson (1878–1948), founding director of the Svenska Biograph, who desperately wanted him to film Ibsen's poem.

Later, during a sentimental trip in the region of Varmland, where he spent his childhood, Sjostrom saw his nanny again, who spoke to him about his mother's courage. Continuing his journey by bicycle, the director arrived in Grimstad on the Norwegian coast, where Ibsen first had the idea of writing the poem. When he returned to Stockholm in August 1916, he was ready to shoot the film Magnusson dreamed of.

The sea plays a leading role alongside the characters. The subtitles do not describe the plot or dialogue, but only quote excerpts from Henrik Ibsen's poem.

In addition to Kiss of Death (1916), A Man There Was is regarded as an early major work by Victor Sjöström as well as a key work for early Swedish film.

== Reception ==
The film premiered on January 29, 1917, simultaneously in Stockholm, Gothenburg, Malmö, and Copenhagen, with a full program with Ibsen's poems in extenso, posters by the artist Eigil Schwab, and specially composed music. When the film was released, public and critical reception was positive. The film received several good reviews in Sweden.

René Jeanne and Charles Ford described this masterpiece as "a sort of intimate 'Roland Song' which celebrates the sea and the men who live with it, denounces the cruelty of war and the ambitions of dictators, and which pities all men whom war has taken away from all that they hold dearest in the world and who find themselves alone."

Terje Vigen is a fundamental milestone in the director's work. "It inaugurates the great period of Sjöström. He has definitely found Ibsen's slow pace, his heavy, solemn gait that envelops the natural world in mysticism."
