= The Strike (1914 film) =

1914 film

- Directed by: Victor Sjöström
- Written by: Adolf Österberg; Victor Sjöström
- Starring: Victor Sjöström
- Cinematography: Julius Jaenzon
- Release date: 15 September 1914
- Running time: 78 minutes
- Country: Sweden
- Languages: Silent; Swedish intertitles

The Strike (Swedish: Strejken) is a 1914 Swedish silent drama film directed by Victor Sjöström. The film was noted for exemplifying the director's "strong sense of realism (...) for some scenes were shot during a real strike".

The film is considered to be lost.

== Cast ==
- Victor Sjöström as Karl Bernsson / Gustav Bernsson
- Lilly Jacobson as Gurli Hagberg
- John Ekman as Boberg
- Carl Borin
- Ernst Eklund
- Alfred Lundberg as Charles Hagberg
- Richard Lund

== Reception ==
In an article for the Swedish Film Database, Bengt Forslund wrote: "One of the many lost films is particularly interesting, however, Strejken, Socialt skådespel in 3 aktres, (1915). The subject itself must have been a hotbed, especially as the First World War broke out in the summer of 1914, which required solidarity from everyone, not a strike. The film also sat dormant for over a year before it was released and was only reviewed in the form of a notice. “The subject is tiring in these times,” Stockholms-Tidningen laconically stated.

The script certainly has several melodramatic elements, but the core of the story is a real strike at a factory."
