= Emmy Albiin =

Swedish actress (1873–1959)

- Born: Emmy Axelina Svensson; 9 June 1873; Stockholm, Sweden
- Died: 24 May 1959 (aged 85); Stockholm, Sweden
- Occupation: Actress
- Years active: 1920-1955 (film)

Emmy Axelina Svensson (9 June 1873 – 24 May 1959), known as Emmy Albiin, was a Swedish stage and film actress. A character actress, she appeared in around sixty Swedish films.

== Selected filmography ==
- A Lover in Pawn (1920)
- The Mill (1921)
- The Phantom Carriage (1921)
- The Flying Dutchman (1925)
- Ingmar's Inheritance (1925)
- The Devil and the Smalander (1927)
- The Storholmen Brothers (1932)
- The Österman Brothers' Virago (1932)
- People of Hälsingland (1933)
- What Do Men Know? (1933)
- The Atlantic Adventure (1934)
- The Marriage Game (1935)
- The People of Småland (1935)
- Ocean Breakers (1935)
- Johan Ulfstjerna (1936)
- Adolf Saves the Day (1938)
- The Fight Continues (1941)
- Lasse-Maja (1941)
- The Case of Ingegerd Bremssen (1942)
- I Am Fire and Air (1944)
- The People of Simlang Valley (1947)
- Sunshine (1948)
- Big Lasse of Delsbo (1949)
- The Street (1949)
- When Love Came to the Village (1950)
- The Motor Cavaliers (1950)
- Love (1952)
- The Shadow (1953)
- Uncle's (1955)

== Bibliography ==
- Steene, Birgitta. Ingmar Bergman: A Reference Guide. Amsterdam University Press, 2005.
- Wright, Rochelle. The Visible Wall: Jews and Other Ethnic Outsiders in Swedish Film. SIU Press, 1998.
