= The Image Makers =

- Written by: Per Olov Enquist
- Directed by: Ingmar Bergman
- Starring: Anita Björk; Elin Klinga; Lennart Hjulström; Carl Magnus Dellow; Henrik Nyberg
- Country of origin: Sweden
- Original language: Swedish

Production
- Running time: 100 minutes
- Production company: Sveriges Television

Original release
- Release: 2000

The Image Makers (Swedish: Bildmakarna) is a 2000 Swedish television play directed by Ingmar Bergman and written by Per Olov Enquist. The drama is set in the year 1920 at Filmstaden where the film director Victor Sjöström is shooting the film The Phantom Carriage, an adaptation of Selma Lagerlöf's novel Thy Soul Shall Bear Witness! Accompanied by actress Tora Teje and film photographer Julius Jaenzon, he has now invited the book's author to take a first look at some early scenes.

The play was originally written for and staged by the Royal Dramatic Theatre, featuring the same cast, where it premiered on 13 February 1998, directed by Bergman. Following the success of the stage production, it was adapted for Swedish television by SVT in 2000 with Bergman as director. It appeared on a UK DVD (Tartan Video, 2008) along with The Phantom Carriage.

== Cast ==
- Anita Björk as Selma Lagerlöf
- Elin Klinga as Tora Teje
- Lennart Hjulström as Victor Sjöström
- Carl Magnus Dellow as Julius Jaenzon
- Henrik Nyberg as projectionist
