= Flickan från Värmland =

1931 film

- Directed by: Erik A. Petschler
- Written by: Sam Ask; Ragnhild Eufrosyne Charlotta Broberg
- Starring: Erik A. Petschler; Gucken Cederborg; Arnold Sjöstrand
- Cinematography: Carl Halling
- Music by: Ragnar Nordin
- Production company: Petschler-Film
- Distributed by: Fribergs Filmbyrå
- Release date: 16 February 1931
- Running time: 85 minutes
- Country: Sweden
- Language: Swedish

Flickan från Värmland is a 1931 Swedish drama film directed by Erik A. Petschler and starring Petschler, Gucken Cederborg and Arnold Sjöstrand. The film's sets were designed by the art director Vilhelm Bryde.

== Cast ==
- Greta Anjou as Greta Blom
- Gucken Cederborg as Madame Ninon
- Märta Claesson as Greta's Mother
- Knut Lambert as Squire
- Herrie de Kahn as Squire's Wife
- Erik A. Petschler as Lehr
- Arnold Sjöstrand as Erik Björck
- Oscar Byström as Chief Superintendent
- Artur Cederborgh as Detective
- Elin Svensson as Buller-Stava
- May von Voss as Flora
- Carin Ygberg as Model
- Nils Åhsberg as Tok-Jan

== Bibliography ==
- Krawc, Alfred. International Directory of Cinematographers, Set- and Costume Designers in Film: Denmark, Finland, Norway, Sweden (from the beginnings to 1984). Saur, 1986.
- Nelmes, Jill & Selbo, Jule. Women Screenwriters: An International Guide. Palgrave Macmillan, 2015.
