= The Monastery of Sendomir =

1920 film

Klostret i Sendomir
- German release poster
- Directed by: Victor Sjöström
- Screenplay by: Victor Sjöström
- Story by: Franz Grillparzer
- Cinematography: Henrik Jaenzon
- Release date: 20 January 1920
- Running time: 76 minutes
- Country: Sweden
- Languages: Silent, Swedish intertitles

The Monastery of Sendomir (Swedish: Klostret i Sendomir) is a 1920 Swedish drama film directed by Victor Sjöström, based on an 1828 short story by Franz Grillparzer. It has also been released in the UK as The Secret of the Monastery. A German adaptation of the story The Monastery of Sendomir, directed by Rudolf Meinert, had been released the previous year.

== Plot ==
The main part of the film is told in a flashback by a monk to two visiting noblemen on their way to Warsaw in the 17th century. He tells them how a mighty count named Starschensky once ruled Sendomir (Sandomierz), but after an intrigue in which his wife was unfaithful with her own cousin he had to use all his resources to build the monastery where they are now staying. At the end it is revealed that the monk is in fact Starschensky himself.

== Cast ==
- Tore Svennberg as Count Starschensky
- Tora Teje as Elga
- Richard Lund as Oginsky
- Renée Björling as Dortka
- Albrecht Schmidt as Manager
- Gun Robertson as Starschensky's Daughter
- Erik A. Petschler as Nobleman
- Nils Tillberg as Nobleman
- Gustaf Ranft as Abbot
- Yngwe Nyquist as Servant
- Axel Nilsson as Friar
- Jenny Tschernichin-Larsson as Coal Miner's Wife
- Emil Fjellström as Friar

== See also ==
- Confessions of a Monk (1922)
