= Gösta Hillberg =

Swedish actor

Nils Fredrik Gösta Hillberg
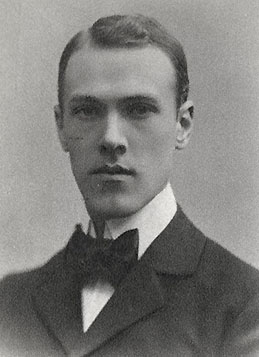
- Born: 28 July 1877; Finland
- Died: 30 March 1958 (aged 80); Stockholm, Sweden
- Occupation: Actor
- Years active: 1920–1944
- Known for: Acting at Vasateatern, Svenska teater, Sydsvenska skådebanan, Royal Dramatic Theatre
- Notable work: Ombytta roller (1920), Flickan från Paradiset (1924)
- Spouse: Berta Schantz (m. 1908)
- Parent: Emil Hillberg (father)

Nils Fredrik Gösta Hillberg (28 July 1877 – 30 March 1958) was a Swedish actor. Hillberg first worked at Vasateatern, Svenska teater and Sydsvenska skådebanan, he also worked at the Royal Dramatic Theatre.

Hillberg was born in Finland. He was the son of actor Emil Hillberg, and in 1908 he married actress Berta Schantz. Besides doing many theater works he also acted in more than fifteen films between 1920 and 1944 amongst them Ombytta roller (1920) and Flickan från Paradiset (1924).

Hillberg died in Stockholm.

== Selected filmography ==
- The Mill (1921)
- The Blizzard (1923)
- Johan Ulfstjerna (1923)
- Where the Lighthouse Flashes (1924)
- Happy Vestköping (1937)
- A Crime (1940)
