= The Woman in the Advocate's Gown =

1929 film

- German: Die Frau im Talar
- Directed by: Adolf Trotz
- Written by: David S. Arnesen; Jane Bess
- Based on: Frk. Statsadvokat (novel) by Peter Bendow
- Starring: Aud Egede-Nissen; Paul Richter; Fritz Kortner; Mona Mårtenson
- Cinematography: Robert Lach; Gunnar Nilsen-Vig
- Production companies: Mondial-Film; Norrøna Film
- Distributed by: Mondial-Film
- Release date: 22 August 1929
- Countries: Norway; Germany
- Languages: Silent; Norwegian / German intertitles

The Woman in the Advocate's Gown (German: Die Frau im Talar; Norwegian: Frøken Statsadvokat) is a 1929 Norwegian-German silent drama film directed by Adolf Trotz and starring Aud Egede-Nissen, Paul Richter, and Fritz Kortner. The screenplay was based on Peter Bendow's novel Frk. Statsadvokat, published in 1929. It was shot at the EFA Studios in Berlin. The film's art direction was by Hans Jacoby.

== Plot ==
A female lawyer commits suicide after discovering the forgery case she is prosecuting had been committed by her own father.

== Cast ==
- Aud Egede-Nissen as Jonne Holm
- Paul Richter as Rolf Brönne
- Fritz Kortner as Consul Backhaug
- Mona Mårtenson as Agda, Rolf's cousin
- Nikolai Malikoff as Wholesaler Holm
- Wolfgang Zilzer as Leif Andersen
- Synnøve Tessmann
- Sigmund Ruud
- Mildred Mehle
- Ferdinand Bonn
- Hugo Döblin
- Hanni Reinwald
