= Mona Mårtenson =

Swedish actress (1902–1956)

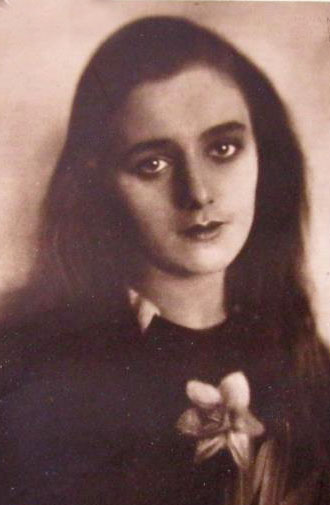
- Born: Monica Ingeborg Elisabeth Mårtenson; 4 May 1902; Stockholm, Sweden
- Died: 8 July 1956 (aged 54); Stockholm, Sweden
- Occupation: Actress
- Years active: 1923-1949

Monica Ingeborg Elisabeth "Mona" Mårtenson (4 May 1902 – 8 July 1956) was a Swedish film actress. She appeared in 28 films between 1923 and 1949. She was born and died in Stockholm, Sweden.

== Early career ==
Mona grew up in Helsingborg and studied at the Royal Dramatic Training Academy. She made her first film appearance in Anderssonskans Kalle på nya upptåg (Kalle Anderssonskan's New Pranks, 1923) directed by Sigurd Wallén. That same year, Mona and her classmate Greta Gustafson (who would change her name to Greta Garbo that same year) were selected by the school to audition for noted Swedish film director Mauritz Stiller. Both actresses were cast in his upcoming film, the epic romance Gösta Berlings saga (The Saga of Gosta Berling) in 1924. The film was based on the 1892 debut novel by Selma Lagerlöf and featured Lars Hanson as the handsome young priest, Gösta Berling, who is fired over his drinking and improper lifestyle. Shamed, he is later hired by an unscrupulous and wealthy woman to be a tutor to her beautiful step-daughter played by Mona Mårtenson.

After the success of the film, Garbo, Hanson and director Stiller were invited to Hollywood, but Mårtenson reportedly turned down a contract offer from Louis B. Mayer. She remained in Stockholm, where she worked in the Royal Dramatic Theatre. She also appeared in several films: Skeppargatan 40 (1925) directed by Gustaf Edgren with Einar Hanson; the two-part Karl XII (1925) directed by John W. Brunius) and featuring Gösta Ekman (senior); and Ingmarsarvet (The Ingmar Inheritance, 1925) directed by Gustaf Molander) with Conrad Veidt. Molander directed Mona and Lars Hanson in another Selma Lagerlöf adaptation, Till österland (To the Orient, 1926), filmed in Jaffa, Israel. She again starred for Molander in Förseglade läppar (Sealed Lips, 1927), co-starring Fred Louis Lerch and Sandra Milovanoff, and based on a story by Guy de Maupassant. A huge success in Sweden, the lead role was to have been played by French actress Geneviève Cargese, who fell ill in Stockholm and was replaced by Mårtenson.

== Laila ==
In Germany, Mårtenson starred in Die Frau im Talar (The Woman in the Advocate's Robe, 1929) directed by Adolf Trotz and featuring Aud Egede-Nissen and Paul Richter. In Norway, she appeared in the romantic melodrama Laila (1929), directed by Danish-German filmmaker and noted cinematographer George Schnéevoigt. In the title role, Mårtenson played a young girl separated from her Norwegian parents as a baby and raised by a wealthy Sami (Lapp) reindeer owner Aslag (Peter Malberg) in the frozen tundra of Scandinavia. Laila grows into a young woman of two worlds, at home with both her settled and nomadic upbringings, but soon finds herself in a love triangle with her foster brother Mellet (Henry Gleditsch) and her cousin Anders (Harald Schwenzen), played out against the dramatic backdrop of the Norwegian mountain country. Schnéevoigt also directed her in Eskimo (1930) with Paul Richter, re-released in German as Der weiße Gott (1932).

== Late career ==
In 1930, she left the Royal Dramatic Theater and moved to Gösta Ekman's Lorensbergsteatern in Gothenburg. In the silent comedy I kantonnement (In the Cantonment, 1932) directed by Lau Lauritzen, Sr., she starred opposite the comic duo Fi og By (Carl Schenstrøm and Harald Madsen). Mårtenson continued her film career into the sound era with I nöd och lust (In Sickness and Health, 1938) directed by Ivar Johansson and in the drama Västkustens hjältar (West Coast Heroes, 1940) directed by Lau Lauritzen and Alice O'Fredericks as the mother of the hero played by Fritiof Billquist. In later years, she played bit parts in Scandinavian films. Her last film was Pippi Långstrump (Pippi Longstocking, 1949) directed by Per Gunvall, the first film adaptation of Astrid Lindgren's classic children's novel, four years after its publication in Sweden. Pippi was played by the 26-year old Viveca Serlachius, and Mårtenson played a supporting role as Pia.

Mona Mårtenson died in 1956 in Stockholm, aged 54.

== Selected filmography ==
- New Pranks of Andersson's Kalle (1923)
- The Saga of Gosta Berling (1924)
- Life in the Country (1924)
- Ingmar's Inheritance (1925)
- 40 Skipper Street (1925)
- Charles XII (1925)
- To the Orient (1926)
- Sealed Lips (1927)
- Viddenes folk (1928)
- The Woman in the Advocate's Gown (1929)
- Eskimo (1930)
- I kantonnement (1932)
- The White God (1932)
- Simon of Backabo (1934)
- Career (1938)
- For Better, for Worse (1938)
- Västkustens hjältar (1940)
- Only a Woman (1941)
- The Talk of the Town (1941)
- The Yellow Clinic (1942)
- My People Are Not Yours (1944)
- Pippi Longstocking (1949)
