= Bra flicka reder sig själv =

1914 film

- Directed by: Victor Sjöström
- Written by: Victor Sjöström
- Starring: Alfred Lundberg
- Cinematography: Hugo Edlund; Julius Jaenzon
- Release date: 12 October 1914
- Running time: 41 minutes
- Country: Sweden
- Languages: Silent; Swedish intertitles

Bra flicka reder sig själv is a 1914 Swedish silent drama film directed by Victor Sjöström.

== Cast ==
- Alfred Lundberg as Fellman
- Richard Lund as Sven
- Clara Pontoppidan as Ruth Landén
- Jenny Tschernichin-Larsson as Ruth's Mother
