= Äktenskapsbyrån =

1913 film

- Directed by: Victor Sjöström
- Written by: Victor Sjöström
- Starring: Helfrid Lambert; Victor Lundberg
- Cinematography: Julius Jaenzon
- Release date: 27 January 1913
- Running time: 20 minutes
- Country: Sweden
- Languages: Silent; Swedish intertitles

Äktenskapsbyrån is a 1913 Swedish silent film written and directed by Victor Sjöström.

== Cast ==
- Helfrid Lambert as Mrs. Petterkvist
- Victor Lundberg as Petterkvist
