= The Girl from the Marsh Croft =

The Girl from the Marsh Croft (German:Das Mädchen vom Moorhof) may refer to:

- The Girl from the Marsh Croft (novella), a 1908 story by Selma Lagerlöf
  - The Girl from the Marsh Croft (1935 film), a German film directed by Douglas Sirk
  - The Girl from the Marsh Croft (1958 film), a German film directed by Gustav Ucicky
  - The Girl from the Marsh Croft (1947 film), a Swedish film directed by Gustaf Edgren
