= The Sea Vultures =

1916 film

- Directed by: Victor Sjöström
- Written by: Emilie Flygare-Carlén; Fritz Magnussen
- Starring: Greta Almroth
- Cinematography: Henrik Jaenzon
- Release date: 31 January 1916
- Running time: 48 minutes
- Country: Sweden
- Languages: Silent; Swedish intertitles

The Sea Vultures (Swedish: Havsgamar and also known as Predators of the Sea) is a 1916 Swedish silent drama film directed by Victor Sjöström. Filmed on the Swedish island of Landsort, the plot entails smuggling. The film starred Richard Lund, Greta Almroth, and John Ekman.

== Cast ==
- Greta Almroth as Gabriele
- John Ekman as Birger
- Nils Elffors as Anton
- Richard Lund as Arnold
- Rasmus Rasmussen as Hornung
- Jenny Tschernichin-Larsson as Mrs. Arnold
