= Lady Marions sommarflirt =

1913 film

- Directed by: Victor Sjöström
- Written by: Algot Sandberg
- Starring: Hilda Borgström
- Cinematography: Julius Jaenzon
- Release date: 3 September 1913
- Running time: 18 minutes
- Country: Sweden
- Languages: Silent; Swedish intertitles

Lady Marions sommarflirt is a 1913 Swedish silent drama film directed by Victor Sjöström.

== Cast ==
- Hilda Borgström as Lady Marion
- Victor Lundberg as Viktor
- Richard Lund as Lord Handsome
- Axel Ringvall as Axel Pärzon
