= In the Hour of Trial =

1915 film

- Directed by: Victor Sjöström
- Written by: Fritz Magnussen
- Starring: Victor Sjöström
- Cinematography: Henrik Jaenzon
- Release date: 8 November 1915
- Running time: 41 minutes
- Country: Sweden
- Languages: Silent; Swedish intertitles

In the Hour of Trial (Swedish: I prövningens stund) is a 1915 Swedish silent drama film directed by Victor Sjöström, who also stars in the film.

== Cast ==
- Kotti Chave as Hogardt's Son (age 4)
- Richard Lund as Hogardt
- Greta Pfeil as Mrs. Nilsson
- Victor Sjöström as Sven Nilsson
