= Alfred Lundberg =

Swedish actor (1852 –1935)

- Born: 5 April 1852; Bälinge, Sweden
- Died: 11 April 1935 (aged 83); Rådmansö, Sweden
- Occupation: Actor
- Years active: 1914–1930 (film)
- Children: Signe Lundberg-Settergren; Hedvig Lindby

Alfred Lundberg (5 April 1852 – 11 April 1935) was a Swedish stage and silent film actor. He appeared in 24 films between 1914 and 1930. He was the father of the actress Signe Lundberg-Settergren.

== Selected filmography ==
- The Strike (1914)
- Bra flicka reder sig själv (1914)
- Hearts That Meet (1914)
- A Fortune Hunter (1921)
- Life in the Country (1924)
- Ingmar's Inheritance (1925)
- The Lady of the Camellias (1925)
- 40 Skipper Street (1925)
- The Tales of Ensign Stål (1926)
- Gustaf Wasa (1928)
- Charlotte Löwensköld (1930)
