= Richard Lund =

Swedish actor (1885–1960)

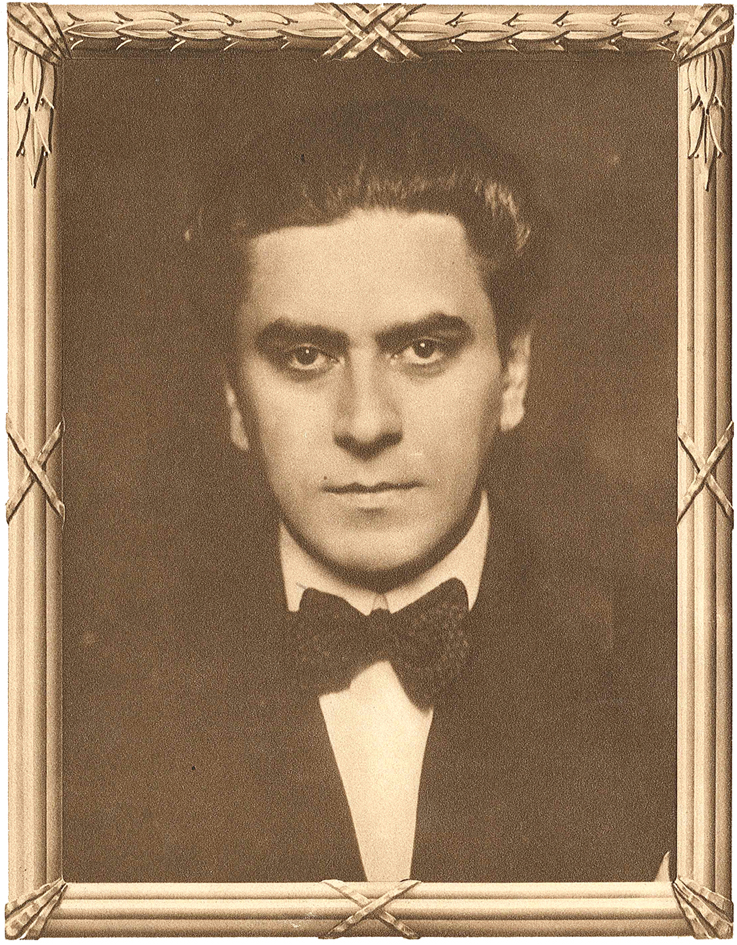
- Born: 9 July 1885; Gothenburg, Sweden
- Died: 27 September 1960 (aged 75); Mölndal, Sweden
- Occupation: Actor
- Years active: 1912–1952

Richard Lund (9 July 1885 – 27 September 1960) was a Swedish film and theatre actor. He made his stage debut at Stora Teatern in Gothenburg in 1904 and later appeared in more than 70 films between 1912 and 1952, making his most important roles during the silent film era. Among his best-known roles is that of Sir Archie in Mauritz Stiller's Sir Arne's Treasure (1919). He was the most prominent "first lover" of Swedish film during his heyday.

== Selected filmography ==
- A Ruined Life (1912)
- Laughter and Tears (1913)
- Lady Marion's Summer Flirtation (1913)
- The Voice of Passion (1913)
- The Conflicts of Life (1913)
- Ingeborg Holm (1913)
- The Clergyman (1914)
- Judge Not (1914)
- The Strike (1914)
- Bra flicka reder sig själv (1914)
- Hearts That Meet (1914)
- In the Hour of Trial (1915)
- The Sea Vultures (1916)
- Sir Arne's Treasure (1919)
- The Monastery of Sendomir (1920)
- Life in the Country (1924)
- The Million Dollars (1926)
- Uncle Frans (1926)
- Artificial Svensson (1929)
- What Do Men Know? (1933)
- Walpurgis Night (1935)
- Under False Flag (1935)
- Conscientious Objector Adolf (1936)
- Johan Ulfstjerna (1936)
- Hotel Paradise (1937)
- John Ericsson, Victor of Hampton Roads (1937)
- Adolf Strongarm (1937)
- Art for Art's Sake (1938)
- Good Friends and Faithful Neighbours (1938)
- Nothing But the Truth (1939)
- Kiss Her! (1940)
- With Open Arms (1940)
- Lärarinna på vift (1941)
- Katrina (1943)
- There's a Fire Burning (1943)

== Sources ==
- Leif Furhammar: Filmen i Sverige (Höganäs 1991)
- Myggans nöjeslexikon, vol. 10 (Höganäs 1992)
