= A Dangerous Wooing =

1919 film

Ett farligt frieri
- Theatrical poster
- Directed by: Rune Carlsten
- Written by: Rune Carlsten; Sam Ask
- Based on: A dangerous courtship by Bjørnstjerne Bjørnson
- Produced by: Filmindustri AB Skandia
- Starring: Lars Hanson; Gull Cronvall; Theodor Blich
- Cinematography: Raoul Reynols
- Release date: December 26, 1919
- Running time: 65 minutes
- Country: Sweden
- Languages: Silent film Swedish intertitles

Ett farligt frieri, or A dangerous proposal, aka A dangerous wooing is the first silent film directed by Swedish director Rune Carlsten in 1919.

The film has been the subject of a restoration by the Swedish Film Institute in 2010, with intertitles in Swedish and English.

== Synopsis ==
In a small village in the Swedish mountains, all the boys are in love with Aslaug, the daughter of rich farmer Knut Husaby. Thormund, the wealthiest farmer in the village proposes to marry his son Ola to Aslaug. Husaby is in favour of this marriage but asks his daughter whether she agrees. Aslaug refuses because she is in love with Tore Naesset, a small-holder's son. Her father is violently opposed to such a wedding and sends her to his summer farm, high in the mountains, hoping she'll change her mind. Tore manages to join Aslaug at the summer farm but on his way back on the only available road which passes by Husaby farm, he gets a hard beating from Husaby who lets him go with an ironic promise: "If next Saturday you manage to slip past the Husaby wolf and his cubs, the girl will be yours". The following week, Tore tries to sneak past the farm without success. He then decides to climb the steep cliff which borders the summer farm on the river side. After nearly falling, he manages to reach the top, exhausted. Husaby, impressed by his courage, agrees to let him marry Aslaug.

== Cast ==
Lars Hanson and Gull Cronvall

- Lars Hanson - Tore Næsset
- Gull Cronvall - Aslaug
- Theodor Blick - Knut Husaby, Aslaug's father
- Hjalmar Peters - Thormund, rich farmer
- Kurt Welin - Ola, Thormund's son
- Hugo Tranberg - Sigurd Husaby
- Gösta Cederlund - Eyvind Husaby
- Hilda Castegren - Tore's mother
- Torsten Bergström - fiddler

== Production ==
The film was based on Bjørnstjerne Bjørnson's novella A dangerous courtship, published in 1856. It was filmed at AB Skandia studios in Långängen with exteriors from the areas around the Hardanger Fjord in Norway. It premièred on 26 December 1919 in Gothenburg and Stockholm.
