= Västkustens hjältar =

1940 film

- Directed by: Lau Lauritzen Jr. Alice O'Fredericks
- Written by: Lau Lauritzen Jr. Alice O'Fredericks
- Starring: Greta Almroth
- Cinematography: Karl Andersson
- Release date: 12 August 1940
- Running time: 79 minutes
- Country: Sweden
- Language: Swedish

Västkustens hjältar is a 1940 Swedish drama film written and directed by Lau Lauritzen Jr. and Alice O'Fredericks. It is a remake of the 1938 Danish film Blaavand melder storm, also directed by Lauritzen and O'Fredericks.

== Cast ==
- Greta Almroth - Karin Larsson
- Wiktor Andersson - Olle Klasson
- Carl Barcklind - Lars Larsson
- Göran Bernhard - Karl Olsson as a child
- Fritiof Billquist - Karl Olsson
- Joel Carlsson - Oskar Lundberg
- Martin Ericsson - Mattias Olsson
- Nils Kihlberg - Sven
- Mona Mårtenson - Anna Olsson
- Sven-Bertil Norberg
- Yngve Nordwall - Erik Gunnarsson
- Arne Nyberg - Torsten
- Ingegerd Resén - Johanna
- Birgit Tengroth - Inger Mattson
- Tom Walter - Torvald Bergström
