= The Girl from the Marsh Croft (novella) =

1908 novella by Selma Lagerlöf

- Title page for The Girl from the Marsh Croft (1916 printing)
- Author: Selma Lagerlöf
- Original title: Tösen från Stormyrtorpet
- Translator: Velma Swanston Howard
- Language: Swedish
- Publisher: Bonniers
- Publication date: 1908
- Publication place: Sweden
- English publication date: 1910
- Pages: 86

The Girl from the Marsh Croft (Swedish: Tösen från Stormyrtorpet) is a 1908 novella by the Swedish writer Selma Lagerlöf. The story has been adapted numerous times for film.

== Publication ==
The story was originally featured in the collection En saga om en saga och andra sagor (English: A tale about a tale and other tales), published through Bonniers in 1908. The whole collection was published in English as The Girl from the Marsh Croft in 1910, translated by Velma Swanston Howard. The story was republished in Sweden in 1917 in its own volume.

== Adaptations ==
Seven film adaptations exist. The first was a 1917 adaptation by Victor Sjöström, known as The Lass from the Stormy Croft, which was a vital early part of what is known as the Golden Age of Swedish Silent Cinema. The other versions are a German and a Turkish (both in 1935), a Finnish (1940), another Swedish (1947), a Danish (1952) and another German (1958) one.

== See also ==
- 1908 in literature
- Swedish literature
