= Fritz Magnussen =

Danish film director (1878–1920)

- Born: 13 September 1878; Copenhagen, Denmark
- Died: 14 April 1920 (aged 41); Denmark
- Occupations: Director; screenwriter
- Years active: 1915-1919
- Known for: In the Hour of Trial (1915); The Sea Vulture (1916); Dommens dag (1918); Skæbnesvangre vildfarelser (1918); Guldspindeln (1916)

Fritz Magnussen (13 September 1878 – 14 April 1920) was a Danish film director and screenwriter of the silent era. He directed more than 20 films between 1915 and 1919. He is known for Dommens dag (1918), Skæbnesvangre vildfarelser (1918) and Guldspindeln (1916).

== Selected filmography ==
- In the Hour of Trial (Swedish: I prövningens stund; 1915 - wrote)
- The Sea Vultures (Swedish: Havsgamar; 1916 - wrote)
