= Axel Ringvall =

Swedish actor

- Born: 17 August 1860; Stockholm, Sweden
- Died: 21 December 1927 (aged 67); Stockholm, Sweden
- Occupation: Actor
- Years active: 1908-1927 (film)

Axel Ringvall (17 August 1860 – 21 December 1927) was a Swedish stage actor and comedian. Towards the end of his career he appeared in several films.

== Selected filmography ==
- Lady Marion's Summer Flirtation (1913)
- A Fortune Hunter (1921)
- Life in the Country (1924)
- The Devil and the Smalander (1927)

== Bibliography ==
- Hans Pensel. Seastrom and Stiller in Hollywood: Two Swedish Directors in Silent American Films, 1923-1930. Vantage Press, 1969.
