= Erik A. Petschler =

Swedish actor and film director

Erik Arthur Petschler
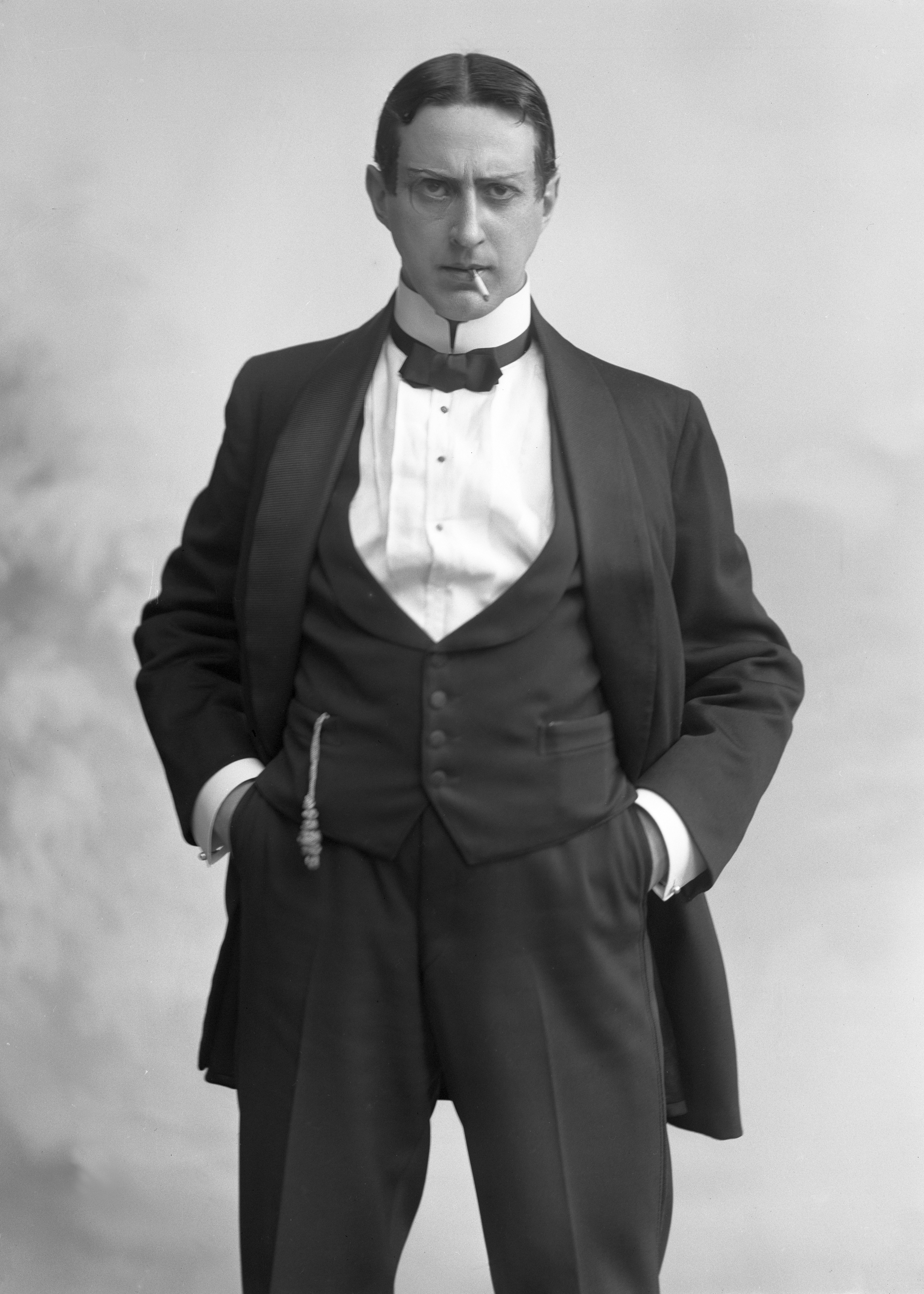
- Petschler in 1914.
- Born: 2 September 1881; Gothenburg, Sweden
- Died: 10 December 1945 (aged 64); Stockholm, Sweden
- Occupations: Actor, Director
- Years active: 1910-1945 (film)

Erik Arthur Petschler (September 2, 1881 – December 10, 1945) was a Swedish stage and film actor and director.

== Selected filmography ==
- The Monastery of Sendomir (1920)
- The Devil and the Smalander (1927)
- Flickan från Värmland (1931)
- Fridolf in the Lion's Den (1933)
- The Ghost Reporter (1941)
- Tonight or Never (1941)
- In Darkest Smaland (1943)
- I Am Fire and Air (1944)

== Bibliography ==
- Hjort, Mette & Lindqvist, Ursula. A Companion to Nordic Cinema. John Wiley & Sons, 2016.
- Wallengren, Ann-Kristin. Welcome Home Mr Swanson: Swedish Emigrants and Swedishness on Film. Nordic Academic Press, 2014.
