= Löjen och tårar =

1913 film

- Directed by: Victor Sjöström
- Written by: Charles Magnusson
- Starring: Victor Lundberg
- Cinematography: Mat van Hensbergen; Julius Jaenzon
- Release date: 3 March 1913
- Running time: 33 minutes
- Country: Sweden
- Languages: Silent; Swedish intertitles

Löjen och tårar (English: Laughter and Tears) is a 1913 Swedish silent drama film directed by Victor Sjöström.

== Cast ==
- Victor Lundberg as Drager
- Mia Hagman as Augusta
- Richard Lund as Arvid Drager
- Tutt Spångberg as Hilda, maid
- Hugo Björne as Larsson
- Justus Hagman as Ferdinand
- Agnes Öberg as Arvid's fiancée
- Erik Lindholm as Drager's manserver
- Stina Berg
