= His Lordship's Last Will =

1919 film

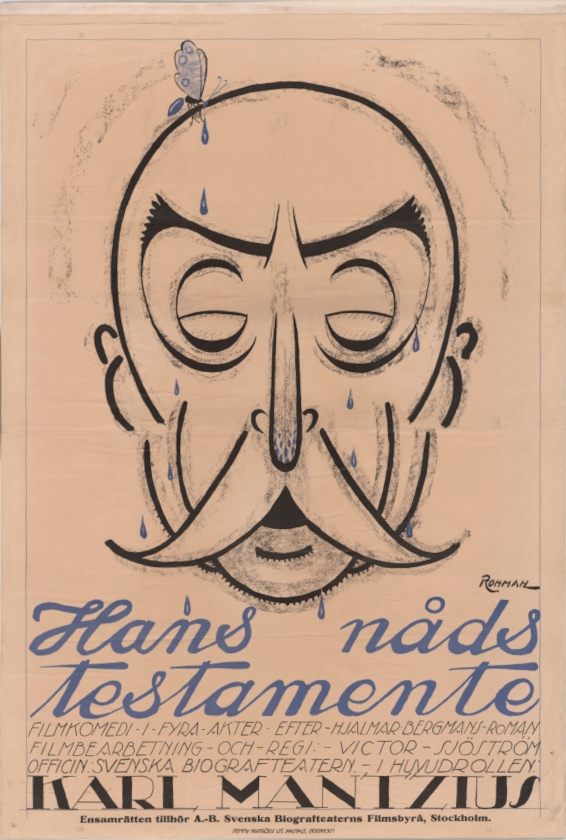
- Directed by: Victor Sjöström
- Written by: Hjalmar Bergman; Victor Sjöström
- Produced by: Charles Magnusson
- Starring: Karl Mantzius
- Cinematography: Henrik Jaenzon
- Release date: 3 November 1919
- Running time: 75 minutes
- Country: Sweden
- Languages: Silent; Swedish intertitles

His Lordship's Last Will (Swedish: Hans nåds testamente and also known as His Grace's Last Testament) is a 1919 Swedish silent drama film directed by Victor Sjöström.

== Cast ==
- Karl Mantzius - His Lordship
- Carl Browallius - Wickberg
- Greta Almroth - Blenda
- Tyra Dørum - Mrs. Enberg
- Georg Blickingberg - Toni
- Semmy Friedmann - Jacob
- Augusta Lindberg - Mrs. Hyltenius
- Sture Baude - Roger Hyltenius
- Nils Ahrén - Mayor Bjoerner
- Josua Bengtsson - Jonsson
- Sigurd Wallén - School Inspector
- Carl Borin - Teacher
- Emil Fjellström - Mailman
- Olof Ås - Farmhand
- Georg Ahl - Per Hyltenius
