= Blodets röst =

1913 film

- Directed by: Victor Sjöström
- Written by: Peter Lykke-Seest; Victor Sjöström
- Starring: Greta Almroth
- Cinematography: Henrik Jaenzon
- Release date: 7 September 1913
- Running time: 89 minutes
- Country: Sweden
- Languages: Silent; Swedish intertitles

Blodets röst is a 1913 Swedish silent drama film co-written and directed by Victor Sjöström.

== Cast ==
- Greta Almroth as Ruth, Daniel and Louise's daughter
- John Ekman as bank director
- Richard Lund as Lander, a lawyer
- Victor Sjöström as Daniel Barkner
- Ragna Wettergreen as Louise Barkner, Daniel's wife
