= Rasmus Rasmussen (actor) =

Norwegian actor (1862–1932)

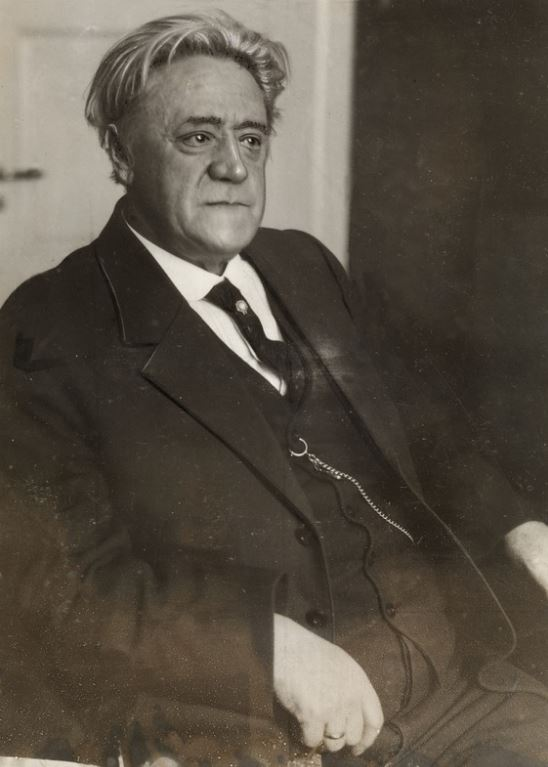
- Born: 4 November 1862
- Died: 17 July 1932 (aged 69)
- Spouse(s): Cathinka Rasmussen

Rasmus Rasmussen (4 November 1862 – 17 July 1932) was a Norwegian actor, folk singer and theatre director.

== Biography ==
Rasmussen was born in Molde, a son of captain Chrispinus Martinus Rasmussen and Anna Helene Carlsen. He emigrated to the United States around 1880, where he earned his living as a logger, but returned to Norway some years later. He performed at Den Nationale Scene in Bergen from 1887 to 1910. The next two years he toured Norway as a singer. He was the first theatre director of Det Norske Teatret, from 1912 to 1914, and during this period he also contributed as actor in several plays. He served as theatre director at Trondhjems nationale Scene from 1916 to 1924.

He appeared in the several silent movies, including Bride of Glomdal and Brudeferden i Hardanger, both from 1926 and his only sound film, Kristine Valdresdatter in 1930.

== Selected filmography ==
- Dolken (1915)
- The Sea Vultures (1916)

Cultural offices
Preceded by None	Director of the Det Norske Teatret; 1912–1915	Succeeded by Edvard Drabløs
