= Svea Kristina Frisch =

Swedish actor, author, journalist and poet

- Born: June 15, 1898; Ramsberg, Örebro county
- Died: 1991 (aged 92–93)
- Spouse(s): Ivar Kåge (1922–1927); Vicke Lindstrand (1929–1946)
- Children: 1

Svea Kristina Frisch (15 June 1898 in Ramsberg, Örebro county – 1991), known as Kristina Lindstrand, was a Swedish actor, journalist, author, and poet.

Her first marriage was during 1922–1927 with the actor and director Ivar Kåge, and the second (1929–1946) was with the painter Vicke Lindstrand. She moved from Sweden to Italy in 1969.

She died in 1991 at the age of 92. She had one son.

== Filmography ==
- Where the Lighthouse Flashes (1924)

== Bibliography ==
- Dagöppning (1942)
- Gästspel (1943)
- Kvinnan och hemmet (1951)
- Pinbänken (1955)
- Hemmet (1956)
- Våra textilier (1957)
- Flytta till solen (1960)
- Pranzo (1960)
- Soppa på solsken (1963)
- Barfotamiljonären (1974)
- Maria på Gedevik (1975)
- Lyktdansen (1976)
- Leva i Ligurien (1978)
