= The Österman Brothers' Virago (1925 film) =

1925 film

- Directed by: William Larsson
- Written by: Thure Alfe
- Based on: The Österman Brother's Virago by Oscar Wennersten
- Starring: Frida Sporrong; Georg Blomstedt; Carl-Ivar Ytterman
- Cinematography: Arthur Thorell
- Production company: Filmindustri AB Triumvir
- Release date: 3 January 1925
- Running time: 85 minutes
- Country: Sweden
- Languages: Silent; Swedish intertitles

The Österman Brothers' Virago (Swedish: Bröderna Östermans huskors) is a 1925 Swedish silent comedy film directed by William Larsson and starring Frida Sporrong, Georg Blomstedt and Carl-Ivar Ytterman. It is one of several films based on the 1913 play of the same title by Oscar Wennersten.

== Synopsis ==
The Österman brothers advertise for a maid to help with the housework on their farm. However, when the attractive but domineering Anna arrives they come to regret this.

== Cast ==
- Frida Sporrong as Anna Söderberg
- Georg Blomstedt as Lars Österman
- Carl-Ivar Ytterman as Karl Österman
- Nils Lundell as Nils Österman
- Jenny Tschernichin-Larsson as Helena Vestman
- Eric Engstam as Jan Vestman
- Edit Rolf as Ella Vestman
- Paul Seelig as Axel Ohlsson
- Valborg Hansson as Countess Lejonflyckt
- Georg af Klercker as Count Lejonflyckt

== Bibliography ==
- Gustafsson, Tommy . Masculinity in the Golden Age of Swedish Cinema: A Cultural Analysis of 1920s Films. McFarland, 2014.
- Larsson, Mariah & Marklund, Anders (ed.). Swedish Film: An Introduction and Reader. Nordic Academic Press, 2010.
