= Livets konflikter =

1913 film

- Directed by: Victor Sjöström; Mauritz Stiller
- Written by: Peter Lykke-Seest
- Starring: Nils Ahrén
- Cinematography: Julius Jaenzon
- Release date: 10 November 1913
- Running time: 64 minutes
- Country: Sweden
- Languages: Silent; Swedish intertitles

Livets konflikter is a 1913 Swedish silent drama film directed by Victor Sjöström and Mauritz Stiller.

== Cast ==
- Nils Ahrén as Charles von Barton
- Ivar Kåge as Carsten Berner
- Richard Lund as Berchtold
- Greta Pfeil as Lila
- Victor Sjöström as Otto Berner
- Jenny Tschernichin-Larsson as Mrs. von Barton
