= William Larsson =

Swedish actor

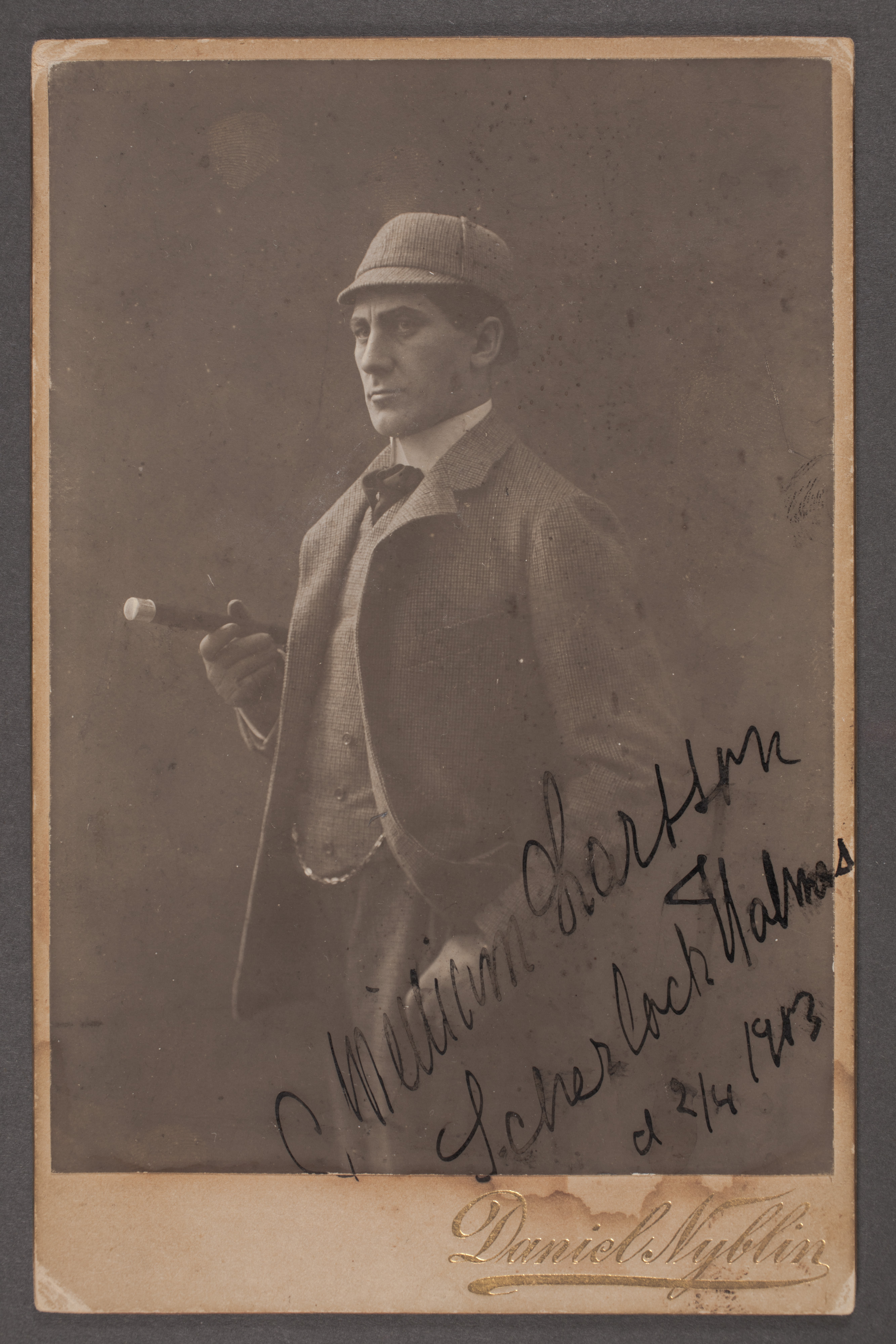
- Born: 1873
- Died: 1926 (aged 52–53)
- Occupation: Actor
- Years active: 1912–1925

William Larsson (1873–1926) was a Swedish silent film actor. He appeared in more than 30 films between 1912 and 1925.

== Selected filmography ==
- Ingeborg Holm (1913)
- Half Breed (1913)
- The Clergyman (1914)
- Judge Not (1914)
- Daughter of the Peaks (1914)
- The Lass from the Stormy Croft (1917)
- The Outlaw and His Wife (1918)
- A Lover in Pawn (1920)
- Iron Wills (1923)
- The Österman Brothers' Virago (1925)
