= Judge Not (1914 film) =

1914 film

- Directed by: Victor Sjöström
- Written by: Marius Wulff
- Starring: Nils Ahrén
- Cinematography: Henrik Jaenzon
- Release date: 31 August 1914
- Running time: 57 minutes
- Country: Sweden
- Languages: Silent; Swedish intertitles

Judge Not (Swedish: Dömen icke) is a 1914 Swedish silent drama film directed by Victor Sjöström.

== Cast ==
- Nils Ahrén - Helder
- Greta Almroth - Clara
- Hilda Borgström - Mary
- John Ekman - Albert Smith
- Nils Elffors
- William Larsson - Ruffian
- Richard Lund - Walter Crain
- Jenny Tschernichin-Larsson - Maid
