= The Devil and the Smalander (1927 film) =

1927 film

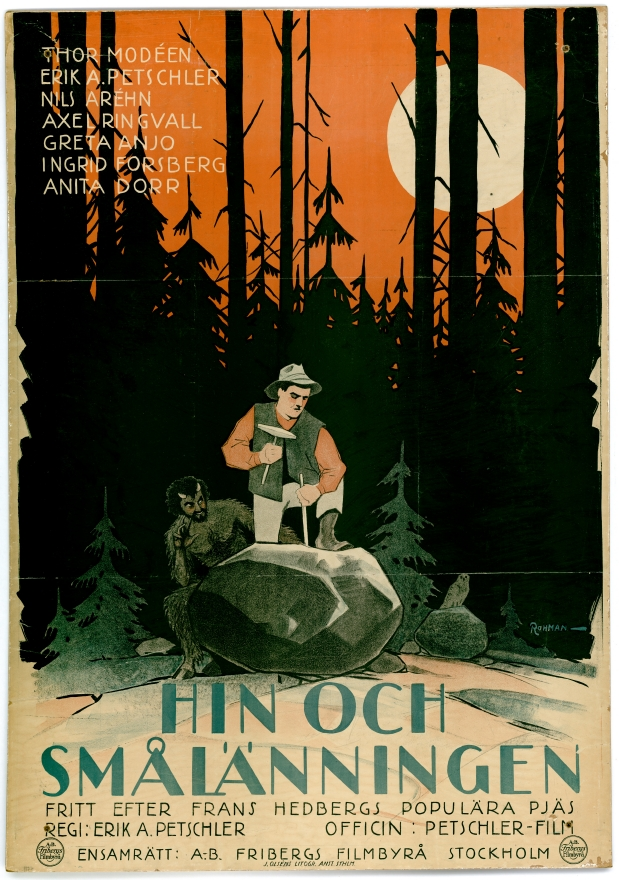
- Directed by: Erik A. Petschler
- Written by: Sam Ask; Erik A. Petschler
- Starring: Erik A. Petschler; Thor Modéen; Jenny Tschernichin-Larsson; Emmy Albiin
- Cinematography: Gustav A. Gustafson
- Production company: Petschler-Film
- Distributed by: Fribergs Filmbyrå
- Release date: 14 November 1927
- Running time: 90 minutes
- Country: Sweden
- Languages: Silent; Swedish intertitles

The Devil and the Smalander (Swedish: Hin och smålänningen) is a 1927 Swedish silent drama film directed by and starring Erik A. Petschler and also featuring Thor Modéen, Jenny Tschernichin-Larsson and Emmy Albiin. It was remade as a 1949 sound film of the same title.

== Cast ==
- Erik A. Petschler as von Zaaten
- Thor Modéen as Gunnar Rask
- Emmy Albiin as Malena Hansson
- Greta Anjou as Elna
- Ragnar Arvedson as Casimir von Suckten
- Nils Aréhn as Mr. Bernfeldt
- Sam Ask as Bark
- Agnes Clementsson as Mrs Wässman
- Anita Dorr as Margit Bernfeldt
- John Melin as Länk
- Axel Ringvall as Wässman
- Birgit Tengroth as A girl
- Jenny Tschernichin-Larsson as Titta Grå
- Gideon Wahlberg as Navvy
- Nils Wahlbom as Man at police station
- Tom Walter as Servant
- Olof Ås as Hjortberg

== Bibliography ==
- Qvist, Per Olov & von Bagh, Peter. Guide to the Cinema of Sweden and Finland. Greenwood Publishing Group, 2000.
