= The Outlaw and His Wife =

Berg-Ejvind och hans hustru
- Theatrical release poster
- Directed by: Victor Sjöström
- Written by: Screenplay: Victor Sjöström; Sam Ask; Play: Jóhann Sigurjónsson
- Produced by: Charles Magnusson
- Starring: Victor Sjöström; Edith Erastoff
- Cinematography: Julius Jaenzon
- Release date: 1 January 1918
- Running time: 111 minutes
- Country: Sweden
- Languages: Silent film; Swedish intertitles

Full film

The Outlaw and His Wife (Swedish: Berg-Ejvind och hans hustru) is a 1918 Swedish silent film directed by Victor Sjöström, based on a play from 1911 by Jóhann Sigurjónsson. It tells the story of Eyvind of the Hills, an 18th-century Icelandic outlaw.

The film was groundbreaking for its portrayal of wild nature. It was shot in two sessions in the spring and late summer 1917, with Åre and Abisko in northern Sweden acting as the highlands of Iceland.

== Plot ==
A stranger who calls himself Kári comes to a farm in the north country. He is hired as a laborer, and the widowed farm owner Halla becomes infatuated with him. The local bailiff, Björn, who is Hall's deceased husband's brother and wants to marry her, becomes jealous of Kári. Another man tells the bailiff that Kári is in fact a thief and fugitive named Eyvind. Kári at first denies being Eyvind and then defeats Björn in a wrestling contest as a measure of his sincerity. However, when Halla proposes marriage, he confesses the truth of what happened in his earlier impoverished life as Eyvind.

When the bailiff returns with others to arrest Eyvind, he and Halla abandon the farm for the bare, cold highlands, where they live for many happy years. They have a baby girl and are accompanied by their friend Arnes.

However, around the time the girl is three, Arnes confesses his loneliness and love for Halla. Halla does not share his feelings, and he decides to leave them. As he is walking away, he sees a group of men approaching and runs back to warn Eyvind and Halla. The men arrive at the same time, and a fight ensues. In fear of capture, Halla throws her child off the cliff into the river below.

Eyvind and Halla escape into the hostile winter. Some time later, they are holed up in a small cabin with no food. They are crazed with hunger. Eyvind considers abandoning Halla but does not. When Eyvind goes for firewood, Halla wanders out of the cabin and freezes in the snow. Eyvind finds her and holds her until he has died, frozen by her side.

== Cast ==
- Victor Sjöström as Eyvind of the Hills
- Edith Erastoff as Halla
- John Ekman as Arnes
- Jenny Tschernichin-Larsson as Guðfinna
- Artur Rolén as Farmhand
- Nils Ahrén as Björn Bergstéinsson
- William Larsson as Bjarni Sveinbjörnsson

== Critical reception ==
Jeff Stafford shared the following thoughts in an essay on the film written for the 2013 San Francisco Silent Film Festival:

While The Outlaw and His Wife (1918) is not as well known [as his later films], it is considered by many film historians to be Sjöström's silent-era masterpiece and, nearly a century after its release, is enjoying a revival that should elevate its stature in the director's pantheon... The Outlaw and His Wife is also infused with a kind of pantheism and puritanical morality that came to mark Swedish cinema. As social renegades the lovers feel their transgressions are subject to the laws of an indifferent universe and when cornered by their pursuers, Halla makes a personal sacrifice that reflects an Old Testament sense of vindication... Film critic David Thomson noted a recurring quality in Sjöström's best work of "wild feelings bursting through moral and social inhibition" and that is an apt summation of the universe of The Outlaw and His Wife where passion and intolerance coexist.
