= Sons of Ingmar =

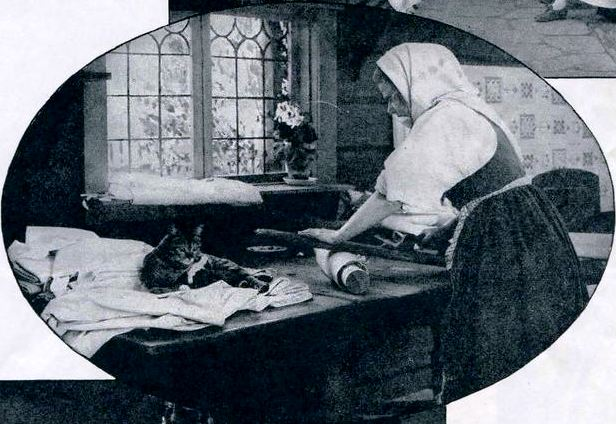
- Film still (cropped for magazine)
- Directed by: Victor Sjöström
- Written by: Screenplay: Victor Sjöström; Novel: Selma Lagerlöf
- Produced by: Charles Magnusson
- Cinematography: Julius Jaenzon
- Production company: AB Svenska Biografteatern
- Release date: 1 January 1919
- Running time: 207 minutes
- Country: Sweden
- Language: Silent film

Sons of Ingmar (Swedish: Ingmarssönerna), also released in the United Kingdom under the title Dawn of Love, is a 1919 Swedish silent drama film directed by Victor Sjöström. It is the first part of his adaptation of Selma Lagerlöf's novel Jerusalem, originally published in 1901 and 1902. It was followed by a second part, Karin, Daughter of Ingmar, the following year.

== Main cast ==
- Victor Sjöström as Lill Ingmar Ingmarsson
- Harriet Bosse as Brita
- Tore Svennberg as Stor Ingmar Ingmarsson
- Hildur Carlberg as Marta
- Hjalmar Peters as Brita's Father
- Svea Peters as Brita's Mother
- Axel Nilsson as Painter
