= Ingeborg Holm =

1913 film

- Directed by: Victor Sjöström
- Written by: Nils Krok (also play); Victor Sjöström
- Starring: Hilda Borgström
- Cinematography: Henrik Jaenzon
- Release date: 27 October 1913
- Running time: 73 minutes
- Country: Sweden
- Language: Silent film

Ingeborg Holm (Margaret Day) is a 1913 Swedish social drama film directed by Victor Sjöström, based on a 1906 play by Nils Krok. It caused great debate in Sweden about social security, which led to changes in the poorhouse laws. It is said to be based on a true story.

== Synopsis ==
Sven Holm and his wife Ingeborg are happily married with three children, and are about to open a shop in Stockholm. They open the shop, but Sven contracts tuberculosis, and dies. Ingeborg initially tries to run the shop by herself, but when she fails, and develops a debilitating ulcer, she turns to the poorhouse for help. The poorhouse board does not grant her enough assistance to survive outside the workhouse. She has to sell the shop and her house, and board the three children out to foster families.

After some time, Ingeborg reads in a letter that her daughter, Valborg, is sick. The poorhouse cannot finance a visit, but the determined Ingeborg escapes at night, and, after being chased by police, gets to see the child. When she returns to the poorhouse, the manager is furious that they must pay a fine for the trouble she caused.

Later on, Ingeborg is offered a chance to see her younger son, this time with the poorhouse's approval. When the child does not recognize her, she is devastated. She tries to make a doll from her scarf for the child to play with, but he cries and turns to his foster mother. This hits Ingeborg so hard that she loses her sanity. She is relegated to the insane women's ward of the workhouse, cradling a plank of wood as if it were one of her children.

After fifteen years, her elder son, Erik, now a sailor, visits her without knowing of his mother's psychosis. He becomes desperate when Ingeborg does not recognize him - but when he shows her a youthful photograph of herself, which features the inscription "To Erik from mother", her sanity returns. With the return of her family comes the return of Ingeborg's self.

== Cast ==
- Hilda Borgström as Ingeborg Holm
- Aron Lindgren as Sven Holm / Erik Holm as an adult
- Erik Lindholm as Employee in Shop
- Georg Grönroos as Poorhouse Superintendent
- William Larsson as Police Officer
- Richard Lund as Doctor
- Carl Barcklind as House Doctor
- Bertil Malmstedt as Erik Holm as a child
