= Jenny Tschernichin-Larsson =

Swedish actress

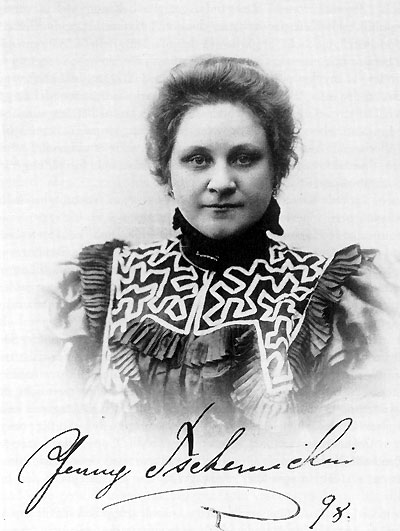
- Born: 1867; Finland
- Died: 15 June 1937 (aged 69–70); Stockholm, Sweden
- Occupation: Actress
- Years active: 1913–1933

Jenny Tschernichin-Larsson (1867 – 15 June 1937) was a Swedish silent film actress. She appeared in more than 40 films between 1913 and 1933.

== Selected filmography ==
- Livets konflikter (1913)
- The Miracle (1913)
- Judge Not (1914)
- Bra flicka reder sig själv (1914)
- Gatans barn (1914)
- Högfjällets dotter (1914)
- Hearts That Meet (1914)
- The Sea Vultures (1916)
- Kiss of Death (1916)
- Therèse (1916)
- The Outlaw and His Wife (1918)
- The Monastery of Sendomir (1920)
- A Wild Bird (1921)
- The Eyes of Love (1922)
- The Österman Brothers' Virago (1925)
- The Devil and the Smalander (1927)
- International Match (1932)
- A Stolen Waltz (1932)
