= Nils Ahrén =

Swedish actor (1877–1928)

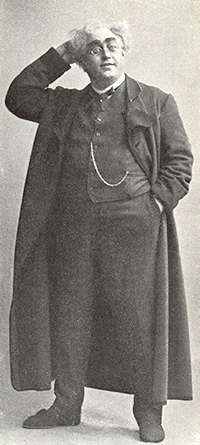
- Nils Ahrén (1909)
- Born: 30 December 1877; Sundsvall, Sweden
- Died: 1 April 1928 (aged 50); Stockholm, Sweden
- Occupation: Actor
- Years active: 1913–1928

Nils Ahrén (30 December 1877 – 1 April 1928) was a Swedish silent film actor. He appeared in 27 films between 1913 and 1928.

== Selected filmography ==
- The Conflicts of Life (1913)
- Judge Not (1914)
- The Outlaw and His Wife (1918)
- His Lordship's Last Will (1919)
- Karin Daughter of Ingmar (1920)
- The Phantom Carriage (1921)
- Thomas Graal's Ward (1922)
- The Lady of the Camellias (1925)
- Ingmar's Inheritance (1925)
- Kalle Utter (1925)
- Only a Dancing Girl (1926)
- To the Orient (1926)
- The Girl in Tails (1926)
- The Devil and the Smalander (1927)
- Troll-elgen (1927)
