= Ester Julin =

Swedish actress, director and screenwriter (1885–1931)

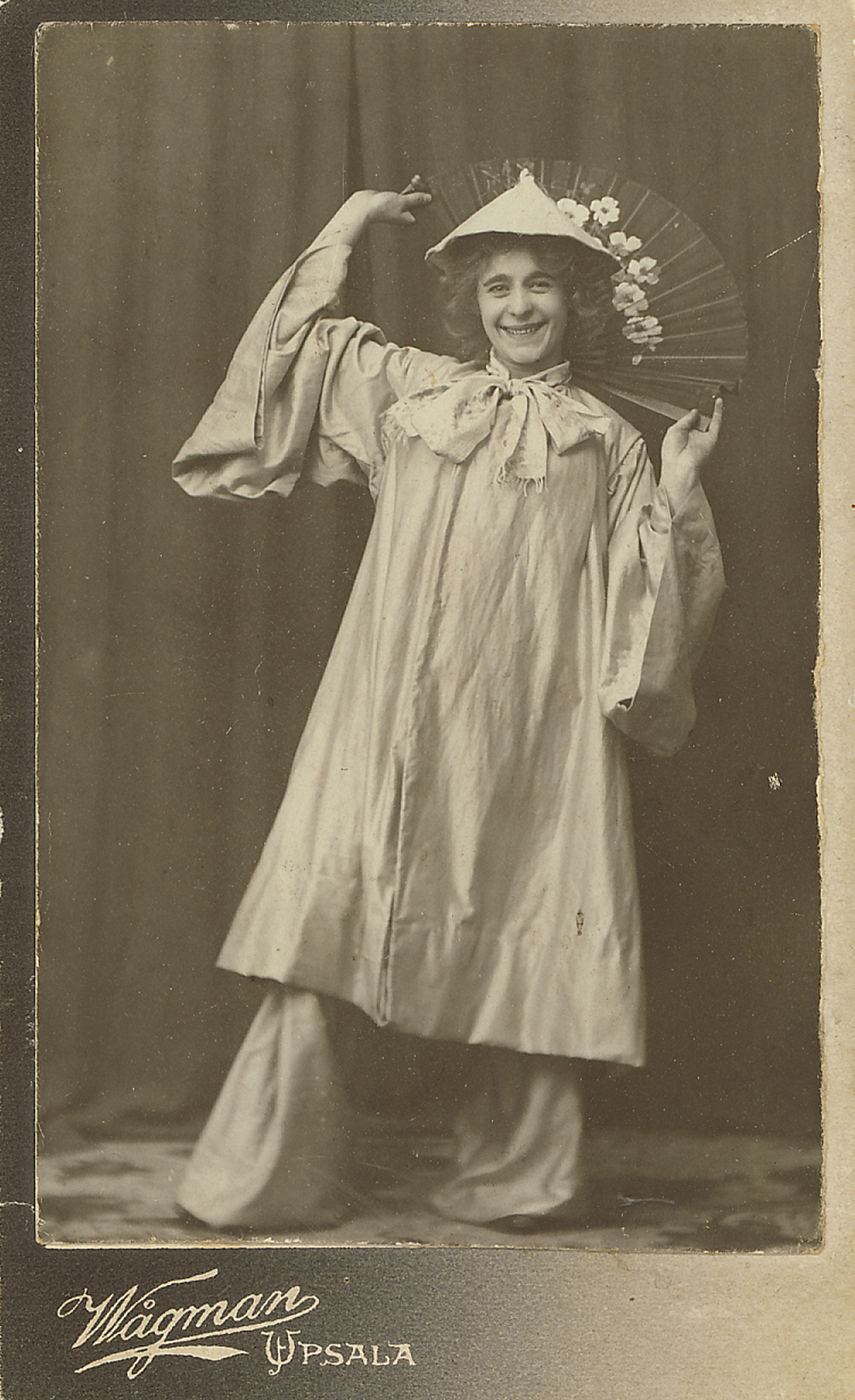

Ester Sofia Margareta Julin (19 January 1885 – 29 April 1931) was a Swedish actress, director and screenwriter.

== Biography ==
Ester Julin was born on 19 January 1885 in Gysinge, Sweden. In the early 1890s her family moved to Uppsala, and later settled in Stockholm. She approached different theater companies, looking for opportunities.

In the beginning of her theatrical career, she acted in various roles, predominantly as a comedian. Afterwards, she came into contact with renowned film directors like Victor Sjöström and Mauritz Stiller, and worked with them in number of popular plays and movies.

She was a "highly respected professional in the early 1920s", and nicked named as "Silent-Movie Queen from Gysinge".

She died in Stockholm on 29 April 1931.
