= Gysinge =

Place in Gävleborg, Sweden

Coordinates: 60°17′21″N 16°53′07″E

Gysinge is a town in the municipality of Sandviken in the county of Gävleborg, Sweden. There are actually two localities: Gysinge (northern part) with 123 inhabitants and Gysinge (southern part) with 174 inhabitants. The history of Gysinge is closely linked with that of the Gysinge forge (Gysinge bruk). It is also the main entry point to Färnebofjärden National Park, established in 1998.

== History ==
The Gysinge forge was founded in 1668, when Peder Swensson received on April 29 the privileges to create a blast furnace. Access to energy from the river as well as to wood made this site, which had previously been used as a summer pasture site for the villagers of Klappsta, a particularly favorable location. The first blast furnace was built in 1670 on what is now hyttbacken, and production of materials for the Swedish army began. At the end of the 1670s, Anders Larsson Höök became co-owner of the forge. In 1677, Anders Larsson Höök received from the king the right to exploit the Dannemora mine as well as the woods around the forge, and soon after the forge received the right to produce wrought iron. The iron produced was of high quality and was in great demand abroad. The forge was enlarged several times during the 18th century.

In the 19th century, Michael Benedicks bought the forge, which then experienced a golden age under his direction and that of his descendants, becoming one of the most important forges in the country. At the end of the century, the Lancashire method was used. When this method began to decline, the engineer F. A. Kjellin developed an induction furnace, which thus became in 1900 the first electric furnace in the world. In 1903 the forge was sold to Stora AB and was shut down.
