= A Lover in Pawn =

1920 film

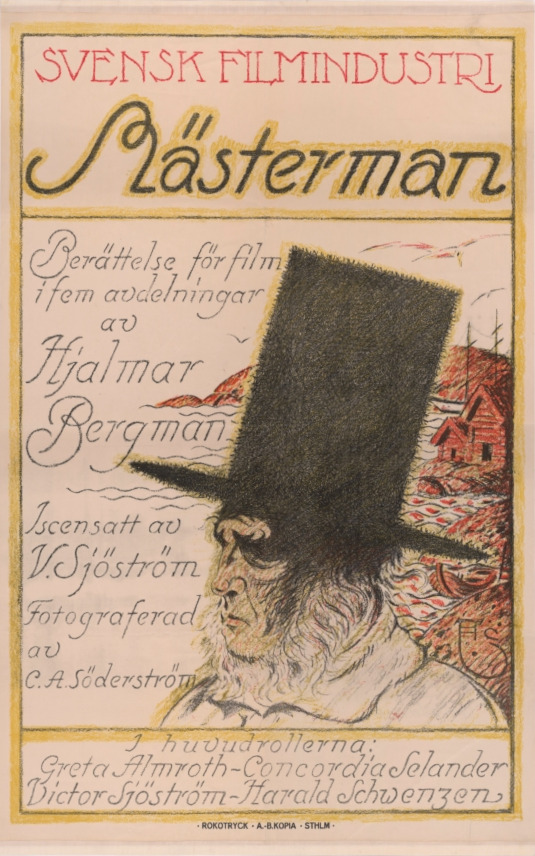
- Directed by: Victor Sjöström
- Written by: Hjalmar Bergman
- Starring: Victor Sjöström
- Cinematography: Julius Jaenzon
- Release date: 11 October 1920
- Running time: 117 minutes
- Country: Sweden
- Languages: Silent; Swedish intertitles

A Lover in Pawn (Swedish: Mästerman) is a 1920 Swedish silent drama film directed by Victor Sjöström.

The film premiered on 11 October and was shot in the Råsunda Film City with exteriors from Öregrund, Vallentuna and Gävle by J. Julius. The film was provided with hand-texted texts and drawn vignettes, executed by the artist Arthur Sjögren.

== Cast ==
- Victor Sjöström as Sammel Eneman
- Concordia Selander as Mutter Boman
- Greta Almroth as Tora
- Harald Schwenzen as Knut
- Tor Weijden as Sailor
- Torsten Hillberg as Sailor
- Olof Ås as Sailor
- Simon Lindstrand as Innkeeper
- William Larsson as Shipmaster
- Emmy Albiin as Poor Woman
