= The Phantom Carriage =

1921 film by Victor Sjöström

- Theatrical release poster
- Directed by: Victor Sjöström
- Screenplay by: Victor Sjöström
- Based on: Körkarlen by Selma Lagerlöf
- Produced by: Charles Magnusson
- Starring: Victor Sjöström; Hilda Borgström; Tore Svennberg
- Cinematography: Julius Jaenzon
- Edited by: Eugen Hellman
- Distributed by: AB Svensk Filmindustri
- Release dates: 1 January 1921 (Sweden); 1 February 1922 (United States)
- Running time: 107 minutes
- Country: Sweden
- Languages: Silent film; Swedish intertitles

The Phantom Carriage (Swedish: Körkarlen, literally "The Wagoner") is a 1921 Swedish silent film directed by and starring Victor Sjöström, based on the 1912 novel Thy Soul Shall Bear Witness! (Körkarlen) by Swedish author Selma Lagerlöf. In the film, Sjöström plays a drunkard named David Holm who, on the night of New Year's Eve, is compelled by the ghostly driver of Death's carriage to reflect on his past mistakes. Alongside Sjöström, the film's cast includes Hilda Borgström, Tore Svennberg, and Astrid Holm.

The Phantom Carriage was released in Scandinavia on New Year's Day 1921. The following year, Metro Pictures Corporation re-edited and released the film in the United States under the title The Stroke of Midnight; it was known as Thy Soul Shall Bear Witness! in the United Kingdom.

The Phantom Carriage is notable for its special effects, its innovative narrative structure with flashbacks within flashbacks, and for having been a major influence on the works of Ingmar Bergman. It has been characterized as belonging to several genres—it has been called a morality tale, a melodrama, a fantasy film, and a horror film. It is sometimes considered one of the first horror films due to its atmosphere and its impact on later entries in the genre. The film is generally considered to be one of the central works in the history of Swedish cinema.

== Plot ==
The Phantom Carriage (1921)

On New Year's Eve, dying Salvation Army Sister Edit has one last wish: to speak with David Holm. David, a drunkard, is sitting in a graveyard, telling his two drinking buddies about his old friend Georges, who told him about the legend that the last person to die each year has to drive Death's carriage and collect the souls of everybody who dies the following year. Georges himself died on New Year's Eve the previous year.

Gustafsson, a colleague of Edit, finds David, but is unable to persuade him to go see her. When his friends try to drag him there, a fight breaks out, and David is struck on the head with a bottle just before the clock strikes twelve. David's soul emerges from his body as the carriage appears. The driver is Georges.

Georges reminds David of how the latter once lived a happy life with his wife Anna, their two children and his brother, until Georges led him astray. As shown in a flashback that follows, David was jailed for drunkenness. Before being released from prison, he was shown his brother, who had been sentenced to a long term for killing a man while drunk. When David went home, he found the apartment empty. Furious, he became determined to track Anna down and have his revenge.

During his search throughout Sweden, David arrives at a new Salvation Army Mission on New Year's Eve. Maria does not want to answer the bell, as it is very late, but Edit lets him in. Despite his rudeness to her, she mends his coat while he sleeps. The next day, she asks him to return in one year; she had prayed that the first visitor would have good fortune for that period and wants to know the outcome of her prayer. He agrees, but before he leaves, he tears out her patches.

Georges informs David that the promise has to be fulfilled and takes him against his will in the carriage to Edit. In another flashback it is shown how Edit once found David in a bar with Gustafsson and another man. Edit persuaded the other man to go home with his wife and gave Gustafsson an advertisement for a Salvation Army meeting. At the meeting, Gustafsson submitted himself to God, but David remained completely unrepentant. Anna was at the meeting, but David did not recognize her. Later, Anna told Edit who she was, and Edit tried to effect a reconciliation. At first, the couple were optimistic, but soon David's behavior drove Anna to despair once again. One night, Anna pleaded with him not to expose their children to his consumption (the same fatal disease Edit caught from him). When he refused, Anna locked him in the kitchen and tried to flee again with their children, but fainted. He broke through the door with an axe, but did not physically hurt her.

When Georges goes into Edit's room, she begs him to let her live until she sees David again. She thinks she is the one to blame for his magnified sins, as she brought the couple together again. When David hears this, he is deeply moved. He kisses her hands, and when Edit sees his regret, she can die in peace. Georges does not take her, saying others will come for her. He then shows David that Anna, afraid of leaving her children alone after she herself dies of consumption, is planning to poison them and herself. David begs Georges to do something, but Georges has no power over the living. Then David regains consciousness in the graveyard. He rushes to Anna before she can act. With great difficulty, he convinces her that he sincerely wishes to reform.

== Cast ==
- Victor Sjöström as David Holm
- Hilda Borgström as Anna Holm
- Tore Svennberg as Georges
- Astrid Holm as Edit
- Concordia Selander as Edit's Mother
- Lisa Lundholm as Maria
- Einar Axelsson (in credits as Einar Axelson) as David's Brother
- Nils Aréhn as Prison Chaplain
- Olof Ås as The First Driver
- Tor Weijden as Gustafsson
- Simon Lindstrand as David's Companion
- Nils Elffors as David's Companion
- John Ekman as Police Constable

== Production ==
=== Development ===
From 1917, there was a deal between Selma Lagerlöf and A-B Svenska Biografteatern to adapt at least one Lagerlöf novel for film every year. Prior to The Phantom Carriage, Sjöström had made three of these adaptions which had all been well received by critics, the audience and Lagerlöf herself. Since all of them had taken place in a rural setting, Sjöström felt that he wanted a change for the fourth and suggested the urban, gritty Körkarlen. Lagerlöf was initially sceptical of adapting the novel's elements of occultism and mysticism to film, and Sjöström was well aware of the difficulties. The script took eight days to finish and in April 1920 Sjöström travelled to Lagerlöf's mansion Mårbacka in Värmland to present it. After two hours of Sjöström reading aloud and performing the whole script himself, Lagerlöf responded by offering him dinner, which Sjöström took as an approval.

=== Filming ===
Double exposures on a gritty Landskrona-inspired street.

Shooting took place from May to July 1920 in the newly started Filmstaden studios in Solna. The set design was inspired by the southern Swedish town Landskrona, which corresponded to what Lagerlöf had in mind when writing the novel. Lagerlöf's original wish was to film it on location in Landskrona, but Sjöström chose to do it in the studio for technical reasons.

=== Post-production ===
Post-production was famously long and intense due to the extensive use of special effects, developed by cinematographer Julius Jaenzon and lab executive Eugén Hellman. Double exposures made in-camera (optical printing was not available until the early 1930s), had been used before by Jaenzon, already in Sir Arne's Treasure from 1919, but were here developed to be far more advanced with several layers. This allowed the ghost characters to walk around in three dimensions, being able to first be covered by an object in the foreground, but when in the same take walking up in front of the object, it would be seen through the ghost's semi-transparent body. One difficulty was that the cameras were hand-cranked, meaning that the camera had to be cranked at exactly the same speed in different exposures for the result to appear natural.

== Release ==
The Phantom Carriage was released in Scandinavia on New Year's Day 1921. The film had its first screening abroad in London on 4 February 1921. In the United Kingdom, it was released under the title Thy Soul Shall Bear Witness!

The following year, Metro Pictures Corporation re-edited and released the film in the United States under the title The Stroke of Midnight. This version of the film alters its narrative structure in such a way that the legend of Death's carriage is not introduced until about halfway through its running time. This version of the film screened at the Criterion Theatre in New York City.

According to Paul Mayersberg, the different titles under which the film was released "reflect the uncertainty of distributors at the time in identifying its genre: ghost story, horror, thriller, religious fable?"

=== Critical reception ===
Upon release, a reviewer for the magazine The Bioscope concluded that "Wherever [The Phantom Carriage] is shown it will help to add dignity and importance to the art of cinema".

== Legacy ==
=== Retrospective assessments ===
On review aggregator website Rotten Tomatoes, the film has an approval rating of 100% based on 15 reviews, with a rating average of 8.9/10.

In 1976, Justin Fox of Films and Filming wrote of The Phantom Carriage as being inferior to the 1920 German Expressionist horror film The Cabinet of Dr. Caligari, asserting that Caligari avoids "the melodramatic naïveties to be found in Sjöström's interesting but overly sober 'second chance' allegory". Years later, Jonathan Rosenbaum of the Chicago Reader praised The Phantom Carriage, calling it Sjöström's masterpiece. In 2008, Marco Lanzagorta of PopMatters applauded the film's camera techniques and narrative structure; he noted elements of social commentary, citing the film's "politically charged storyline around the negative social effects of alcoholism and poverty in 1920s Sweden", and called it "arguably [...] one of the greatest films ever made".

In 2012, The Phantom Carriage was voted the best Swedish film of all time by a poll of 50 film critics and academics conducted by Swedish film magazine FLM.

In 2019, Collider's Dave Trumbore named The Phantom Carriage one of the best horror films released between 1900 and the 1950s. That same year, Jim Vorel of Paste named it the best horror film of 1921, calling it "a masterpiece of composition and a breakthrough in early practical effects (especially double exposures to simulate ghostly transparency) within the horror genre, although the film functions just as much as a morality playlet and over-the-top melodrama."

=== Influence ===
The Phantom Carriage was an influence on the later Swedish film director Ingmar Bergman who also utilised the figure of Death in The Seventh Seal, where the referring to him as a "strict master" is a reference to The Phantom Carriage. Bergman also cast Sjöström in the leading role for Wild Strawberries, which also features references to the film. Bergman has said that he first saw it at 15 and watched it at least once every year. The television play The Image Makers (2000), directed by Bergman, is a historical drama depicting the making of The Phantom Carriage.

It is listed in the film reference book 1001 Movies You Must See Before You Die, which reads: "The Phantom Carriage not only cemented the fame of director-screenwriter-actor Victor Sjöström and Swedish silent cinema, but also had a well-documented, artistic influence on many great directors and producers." Stanley Kubrick's 1980 horror film The Shining features several thematic and visual similarities with The Phantom Carriage, namely the effects of alcoholism on a family unit, and a sequence in which a father uses an axe to break through a wooden door to reach his fleeing wife and child. The 1979 film The Amityville Horror contains a similar scene. The movie has been cited as an influence for the 2024 film Nosferatu.

== Restorations and home media ==
For decades, The Phantom Carriage was only available in poor quality, black-and-white prints, often of the American release version, with English intertitles.

1975: The Swedish Film Institute combined two incomplete positive nitrate prints, one B&W with Swedish intertitles and the other colour-tinted with English intertitles, to make a complete 35mm B&W duplicate negative with Swedish intertitles (approx. 6438 ft at 16fps). New viewing prints were struck from this restored negative, using the tinted nitrate print as a colour reference.

1995: An incomplete (approx. 6057 ft at 18fps) but good quality, colour tinted print with a custom score by Elena Kats-Chernin was broadcast on ZDF/Arte, and later released on German VHS (1995) and DVD (2009).

1998: The tinted Swedish restoration was released domestically on VHS with a brand new custom score by Swedish musician Matti Bye. In 2007, it was also released on Swedish DVD with the Bye score. In 2008, it was simultaneously released on two UK DVDs, one with Bye's score and the other featuring a new score by electronic duo KTL.

2011: In collaboration with the Swedish Film Institute, the Criterion Collection released a new digital scan of the Swedish Film Institute's restoration on US Blu-ray and DVD, featuring both the Bye and KTL scores.

2015: The Swedish Film Institute carried out a further digital transfer of their restoration; this version is only available as a DCP, with or without Bye's recorded score.
