= Eigil Schwab =

Swedish painter (1882–1952)

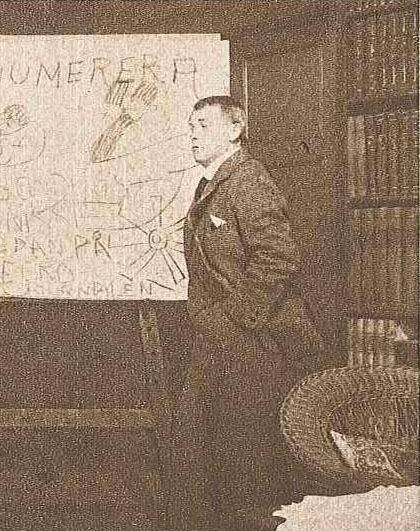
- Eigil Schwab in 1916
- Born: 28 March 1882; Stockholm, Sweden
- Died: 4 July 1952 (aged 70); Stockholm, Sweden
- Occupation: Painter

Eigil Schwab (28 March 1882 – 4 July 1952) was a Swedish painter. His work was part of the painting event in the art competition at the 1932 Summer Olympics.
