= Olof Adolf Sjöström =

Swedish-American fraudster (1841–1896)

Olof Adolf Sjöström (Swedish: [ˈɧø̂ːstrœm]; February 4, 1841 – 1896) operated a remittance company that defrauded customers in 1894.

== Biography ==
He was born on February 4, 1841, in Ljustorp, Sweden. He moved to America around 1880, and he started a money transfer agency in Brooklyn that transferred money back to Sweden. The rest of the Sjöström family then came to America. Olaf's wife died around 1886. His son, Victor David Sjöström was sent back to Sweden to the town of Uppsala. Olaf married Maria Olson in 1886, she had been the nanny. In 1894 Olaf's agency owed $30,000 and he fled the country but promised to pay back his debts within three years. New York Supreme Court Justice William Jay Gaynor declared that Sjöström had officially fled the country and allowed creditors to stop the widow from selling his property. He died in 1896 without returning the money to his clients.
