= Life in the Country (1924 film) =

1924 film

- Directed by: Ivan Hedqvist
- Written by: Oscar Hemberg; Lars Tessing
- Based on: From My Farming Days by Fritz Reuter
- Produced by: Oscar Hemberg
- Starring: Axel Ringvall; Ivan Hedqvist; Mona Mårtenson
- Cinematography: Julius Jaenzon
- Production company: Aladdin-Film
- Release date: 3 November 1924
- Running time: 97 minutes
- Country: Sweden
- Languages: Silent; Swedish intertitles

Life in the Country (Swedish: Livet på landet) is a 1924 Swedish silent drama film directed by Ivan Hedqvist and starring Axel Ringvall, Hedqvist and Mona Mårtenson. It is based on the classic German novel From My Farming Days by Fritz Reuter. It is now considered a lost film. A second Swedish adaptation of the novel Life in the Country was produced in 1943.

The film's sets were designed by the art director Vilhelm Bryde.

== Synopsis ==
A ruthless landowner drives the widowed Karl Hawermann and his daughter Louise from their land.

== Cast ==
- Axel Ringvall as Uncle Zaakarias Bräsig
- Ivan Hedqvist as Karl Hawermann
- Mona Mårtenson as Louise Hawermann
- Axel Hultman as Pomuchelskopp
- Alfred Lundberg as von Rambow
- Richard Lund as Axel von Rambow
- Renée Björling as Frida von Rambow
- Carl Browallius as Vicar Behrens
- Gucken Cederborg as Mrs. Behrens
- Einar Hanson as Frans von Rambow

== Preservation status ==
Life in the Country is considered a lost film, except for a very short fragment that survived in the SVT archive thanks to its inclusion in a newsreel on the occasion of Axel Ringvall's death in 1927.

== Bibliography ==
- Tommy Gustafsson. Masculinity in the Golden Age of Swedish Cinema: A Cultural Analysis of 1920s Films. McFarland, 2014.
