= Kiss of Death (1916 film) =

1916 film

- Directed by: Victor Sjöström
- Written by: A. V. Samsjö; Sam Ask; Victor Sjöström
- Starring: Victor Sjöström
- Cinematography: Julius Jaenzon
- Release date: 25 August 1916
- Running time: 58 minutes
- Country: Sweden
- Languages: Silent; Swedish intertitles

Kiss of Death (Swedish: Dödskyssen) is a 1916 Swedish silent drama film directed by Victor Sjöström. Approximately 30 minutes of the film survives in the Cinémathèque française film archive.

== Cast ==
- Victor Sjöström as Överingenjör Weyler / Ingenjör Lebel
- Albin Lavén as Dr. Monro
- Mathias Taube as Doctor Adell
- Wanda Rothgardt
- Jenny Tschernichin-Larsson as Anna Harper

== See also ==
- List of incomplete or partially lost films
