= Jerusalem (Lagerlöf novel) =

Swedish novel by Selma Lagerlöf (1901–1902)

- Author: Selma Lagerlöf
- Translator: Velma Swanston Howard
- Language: Swedish
- Publisher: Bonnier
- Publication date: 1901–1902
- Publication place: Sweden
- English publication date: 1915
- Pages: 671 (total pages)

Jerusalem is a novel by the Swedish writer Selma Lagerlöf, published in two parts in 1901 and 1902. The narrative spans several generations in the 19th century and focuses on several families in Dalarna, Sweden, and a community of Swedish emigrants in Jerusalem. It is loosely based on a real emigration that took place from the parish of Nås in 1896.

As part of her research Lagerlöf went to visit Horatio and Anna Spafford at the American Colony, Jerusalem.

== Adaptations ==
The first four chapters of the first book were adapted into two ambitious films by Victor Sjöström in 1919 and 1920, Sons of Ingmar and Karin Daughter of Ingmar, respectively. Sjöström originally intended to film the entire suite, but decided to cancel the project after the second film received unenthusiastic critical response. Gustaf Molander picked up where Sjöström left and released his adaptation of the first book, Ingmarsarvet, in 1925, followed by the second, Till Österland, in 1926. The Danish filmmaker Bille August directed a 1996 film version with the title Jerusalem.

A stage adaptation, Ingmarsspelen, has become an annual tradition in Nås, Dalarna, where it has been performed outdoors every year since 1959.

== See also ==
- 1901 in literature
- Swedish literature
