= Victor Sjöström =

Swedish film director, screenwriter and actor (1879–1960)

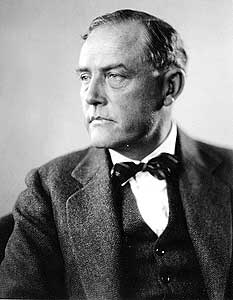
- Born: Victor David Sjöström; 20 September 1879; Årjäng, Värmlands län, Sweden
- Died: 3 January 1960 (aged 80); Stockholm, Sweden
- Occupations: Director, screenwriter, actor
- Years active: 1896–1957
- Spouse(s): Alexandra Stjagoff (1900–1912); Lili Bech (1914–1916); Edith Erastoff (m. 1922; died 1945)
- Parent: Olof Adolf Sjöström (1841–1896)
- Awards: NBR Award for Best Actor; 1958 Wild Strawberries

Victor David Sjöström (Swedish: [ˈvɪ̌kːtɔr ˈɧø̂ːstrœm]; 20 September 1879 – 3 January 1960), also known in the United States as Victor Seastrom, was a pioneering Swedish film director, screenwriter, and actor. He began his career in Sweden, before moving to Hollywood in 1924. Sjöström worked primarily in the silent era; his best known films include The Phantom Carriage (1921), He Who Gets Slapped (1924), and The Wind (1928). Sjöström was Sweden's most prominent director in the "Golden Age of Silent Film" in Europe. Later in life, he played the leading role in Ingmar Bergman's Wild Strawberries (1957).

== Early life ==
Victor David Sjöström was born on 20 September 1879 in Årjäng/Silbodal, in the Värmland region of Sweden. He was only a year old when his father, Olof Adolf Sjöström, moved the family to Brooklyn, New York. His mother died in 1886, when he was seven years old. Sjöström returned to Sweden where he lived with relatives in Stockholm, beginning his acting career at 17 as a member of a touring theater company.

== Career ==
Drawn from the stage to the fledgling motion picture industry, he made his first film in 1912 under the direction of Mauritz Stiller. Between 1912 and 1923, he directed another forty-one films in Sweden, some of which are now lost. Those surviving include The Sons of Ingmar (1919), Karin, Daughter of Ingmar (1920) and The Phantom Carriage (1921), all based on stories by the Nobel Prize-winning novelist Selma Lagerlöf. Many of his films from the period are marked by subtle character portrayal, fine storytelling and evocative settings in which the Swedish landscape often plays a key psychological role. The naturalistic quality of his films was enhanced by his (then revolutionary) preference for on-location filming, especially in rural and village settings. He is also known as a pioneer of continuity editing in narrative filmmaking.

In 1923, Sjöström accepted an offer from Louis B. Mayer to work in the United States. In Sweden, he had acted in his own films as well as in those for others, but in Hollywood he devoted himself solely to directing. Using an anglicized name, Victor Seastrom, he made the drama film Name the Man (1924) based on the Hall Caine novel, The Master of Man. He directed stars of the day such as Greta Garbo, John Gilbert, Lillian Gish, Lon Chaney, and Norma Shearer in another eight films in America before his first talkie in 1930. One of these was the 1926 film The Scarlet Letter, starring Lillian Gish as the adulterous Hester Prynne.

Uncomfortable with the modifications needed to direct sound films, Victor Sjöström returned to Sweden, where he directed two more films before his final directing effort, an English-language drama filmed in the United Kingdom Under the Red Robe (1937). Over the following 15 years, Sjöström returned to acting in the theatre, performed a variety of leading roles in more than a dozen films, and was a company director of Svensk Film Industri. Arguably his most noted performance came with his final film role. On the cusp of turning 78, he played the elderly professor Isak Borg in Ingmar Bergman's film Wild Strawberries (1957).

== Personal life ==
Sjöström was married three times. His daughter actress Guje Lagerwall (1918–2019) was born to his third wife actress Edith Erastoff-Sjöström.

== Death and legacy ==
Victor Sjöström died in Stockholm on 3 January 1960 at the age of 80, from undisclosed causes, and was buried in the Norra begravningsplatsen (Northern cemetery).

A theatre in Filmhuset, home of the Swedish Film Institute, was named in his honour as "Bio Victor". His film The Phantom Carriage serves as an inspiration for the 2024 film Nosferatu.

== Filmography ==
=== Director ===
- A Ruined Life (Ett hemligt giftermål) (1912)
- The Gardener (Trädgårdsmästaren) (1912)
- Äktenskapsbyrån (1913)
- Löjen och tårar (1913)
- Lady Marions sommarflirt (1913)
- Blodets röst (1913)
- Livets konflikter (1913)
- Ingeborg Holm (Margaret Day) (1913)
- Halvblod (1913)
- Miraklet (1913)
- The Poacher (Kärlek starkare än hat eller skogsdotterns hemlighet) (1914)
- Prästen (Saints and Their Sorrows, The Clergyman, The Parson) (1914)
- Judge Not (Dömen icke) (1914)
- The Strike (Strejken) (1914)
- Bra flicka reder sig själv (1914)
- Gatans barn (1914)
- Högfjällets dotter (1914)
- Hjärtan som mötas (1914)
- One of the Many (En av de många) (1915)
- Sonad skuld (1915)
- Det var i maj (1915)
- The Governor's Daughters (Landshövdingens döttrar, Det var i maj) (1915)
- Stick to Your Last, Shoemaker (Skomakare, bliv vid din läst) (1915)
- In the Hour of Trial (I prövningens stund) (1915)
- The Price of Betrayal (Judaspengar) (1915)
- Skepp som mötas (1916)
- The Sea Vultures (Havsgamar, Predators of the Sea) (1916)
- She Triumphs (Hon segrade) (1916)
- Kiss of Death (Dödskyssen) (1916)
- Therèse (1916)
- A Man There Was (Terje Vigen) (1917)
- The Lass from the Stormy Croft (Tösen från Stormyrtorpet, The Girl from the Marsh Croft, The Woman He Chose) (1917)
- The Outlaw and His Wife (Berg-Ejvind och hans hustru, Eyvind of the Hills, Love: The Only Law, You and I) (1918)
- Sons of Ingmar (Ingmarssönerna, Dawn of Love) (1919)
- His Lordship's Last Will (Hans nåds testamente, His Grace's Last Testament, His Grace's Will) (1919)
- The Monastery of Sendomir (Klostret i Sendomir, Secret of the Monastery) (1920)
- Karin, Daughter of Ingmar (Karin Ingmarsdotter, God's Way) (1920)
- A Lover in Pawn (Mästerman) (1920)
- The Phantom Carriage (Körkarlen, The Phantom Chariot, The Stroke of Midnight, Thy Soul Shall Bear Witness) (1921)
- Love's Crucible (Vem dömer, Mortal Clay) (1922)
- The Surrounded House (Det omringade huset, The House Surrounded) (1922)
- Fire on Board (Eld ombord, Jealousy, The Hell Ship) (1923)
- Name the Man (1924)
- He Who Gets Slapped (1924)
- Confessions of a Queen (1925)
- The Tower of Lies (1925)
- The Scarlet Letter (1926)
- The Divine Woman (1928)
- The Masks of the Devil (1928)
- The Wind (1928)
- A Lady to Love (1930)
- Father and Son (1930)
- Markurells i Wadköping (Markurells i Wadköping, Father and Son, Vater und Sohn) (1931)
- Under the Red Robe (1937)

=== Actor ===
- De svarta maskerna (1912) as Lieutenant von Mühlen
- I lifvets vår (1912) as Cyril Alm
- The Voice of Passion (1913) as Daniel Barkner
- The Conflicts of Life (1913) as Otto Berner
- För sin kärleks skull (1914) as Borgen
- The Strike (1914) as Karl Bernsson / Gustav Bernsson
- Kiss of Death (1916) as Òveringenjör Weyler / Ingenjör Lebel
- Terje Vigen (A Man There Was, 1917) as Terje Vigen
- Thomas Graals bästa barn (Thomas Graal's First Child 1917) as Thomas Graal
- The Outlaw and His Wife (1918) as Outlaw / Kári
- Thomas Graals bästa barn (1918) as Thomas Graal
- Sons of Ingmar (1919) as Lill Ingmar Ingmarsson
- Karin Daughter of Ingmar (1920) as Ingmar
- A Lover in Pawn (1920) as Sammel Eneman
- Körkarlen (The Phantom Carriage, 1921) as David Holm
- Det omringade huset (1922) as Captain Davies
- Eld ombord (1923) as Dick
- Colourful Pages (1931) as Sjöström, director (uncredited)
- Markurells i Wadköping (1931) as Markurell
- Synnöve Solbakken (1934) as Sämund - Sæmund
- Walpurgis Night (1935) as Frederik Bergström, Editor
- John Ericsson, Victor of Hampton Roads (1937) as John Ericsson
- Gubben kommer (1939) as Carl-Henrik de Grévy, 'Gubben'
- Mot nya tider (1939) as Hjalmar Branting
- The Fight Continues (1941) as Andreas Berg
- There's a Fire Burning (1943) as Henrik Falkman
- The Word (1943) as Knut Borg Sr.
- The Emperor of Portugallia (1944) as Jan i Skrolycka
- Rail Workers (1947) as Stora Ballong
- I Am with You (1948) as Vicar
- Dangerous Spring (1949) as P. Bladh, antiques dealer
- Till glädje (To Joy, 1950, directed by Ingmar Bergman) as professor Sönderby
- The Quartet That Split Up (1950) as Gustaf Borg
- The Clang of the Pick (1952) as Klaus Willenhart
- Love (1952) as Bishop
- Men in the Dark (1955) as Gustaf Landberg
- Smultronstället (Wild Strawberries, 1957, directed by Ingmar Bergman) as Dr. Eberhard Isak Borg (final film role)
