= Selander =

Selander is a surname of Scandinavian origin. Notable people with the surname include:

- Bjørn Selander (born 1988), American racing cyclist
- Concordia Selander (1861–1935), Swedish stage and film actress and theatre manager
- Hans "Hasse" Selander (born 1945), Swedish former footballer
- Hjalmar Selander (1859 -1928), Swedish actor, stage director and theatre manager
- Lesley Selander (1900–1979), American film director
- Robert Selander (born 1951), American businessman, former president and chief executive officer of MasterCard
- Robert K. Selander, (1927–2015), American evolutionary biologist

== See also ==
- Selander Company, theatre company in Sweden from 1889 to 1928
