= The Shanghai Gesture =

1941 film by Josef von Sternberg

- Theatrical release poster
- Directed by: Josef von Sternberg
- Screenplay by: Josef von Sternberg; Geza Herczeg; Jules Furthman
- Based on: the play The Shanghai Gesture by John Colton
- Produced by: Arnold Pressburger
- Starring: Gene Tierney; Walter Huston; Victor Mature; Ona Munson
- Cinematography: Paul Ivano
- Edited by: Sam Winston
- Music by: Richard Hageman
- Production company: Arnold Pressburger Films
- Distributed by: United Artists
- Release date: December 25, 1941 (New York City)
- Running time: 99 minutes
- Country: United States
- Language: English
- Budget: $580,000
- Box office: $1.1 million (US rentals)

The Shanghai Gesture is a 1941 American film noir directed by Josef von Sternberg and starring Gene Tierney, Walter Huston, Victor Mature, and Ona Munson.

The film The Shanghai Gesture is based on a Broadway play The Shanghai Gesture by John Colton. It was adapted for the screen by Sternberg and produced by Arnold Pressburger for United Artists.

Boris Leven received an Academy Award nomination for Best Art Direction, while Richard Hageman was nominated for Best Original Music Score.

== Plot ==
The film begins in Shanghai, China, with the police arresting Dixie Pomeroy, a penniless chorus girl from Brooklyn. However, a man named Doctor Omar intervenes and bribes the police; they release Dixie into his custody. He takes her to a casino in the European sector of city that owned by "Mother" Gin Sling, his boss.

Meanwhile, Victoria's father, Sir Guy Charteris, has purchase a large tract of land in Shanghai for development, including the casino building. The city authorities tell Gin Sling that she has until Chinese New Year, five or six weeks away, to vacate the premises. Her only option is to move the casino into the Chinese section, which will severely impact her business.

Gin Sling orders her minions to find out the identify of the person buying the property. Dixie is able to identify Charteris as the buyer since he had taken her out several times. Dixie proves to be an unexpected source of information; Charteris had taken her out to dinner a number of times, then dumped her before his daughter arrived in Shanghai From Dixie's description, Gin Sling realizes Charteris is someone from her past.

Victoria has become infatuated with Omar and addicted to gambling and alcohol. Although Victoria is contemptuous of Gin Sling, she allows her credit to cover her ever-growing losses. At one point, someone tries to sell Poppy's valuable necklace to her father. Realizing that his daughter is in deep trouble, Charteris orders her to fly back to England

Meanwhile, Gin Sling had invited Charteris and other important dignitaries to a Chinese New Year dinner party. Charteris at first declines, but then changes his mind. At the dinner, Gin Sling exposes his disgraceful past. Years ago Charteris, then calling himself Victor Dawson, had married Gin Sling and they had a baby. At the party, Gin Sling accuses Charteris of abandoning her, taking her money and the baby, leaving her destitute and alone. Gin Sling wandered through China until she reached Shanghai. There, Percival Howe had faith in her and backed her financially, allowing her to work her way up to her current position.

At this point, Victoria appears in the casino. As Charteris takes his wayward daughter out, he tells Van Elst privately to come to his office the next morning to pick up a £20,000 check for Gin Sling. Van Elst was to tell Gin Sling that "the funds she claims I took are, and always have been in an account in her name" in a North China bank.

Victoria breaks away from her father and reenters the casino, where the other guests have left. When Charteris returns to retrieve her, he is confronted by Gin Sling. He then reveals to Gin Sling that Victoria is her daughter. He had found her abandoned in a hospital and took her to England.

Gin Sling then tries to talk to Victoria alone, revealing that she is her mother. When Victoria continues insulting her, Gin Sling shoots her dead. Gin Sling then remarks to Howe that this is something she cannot bribe her way out of. The muscular minion, standing outside with Charteris, delivers the bitingly ironic last line "you likee Chinese New Year?" as Charteris realizes what has happened.

== Cast ==
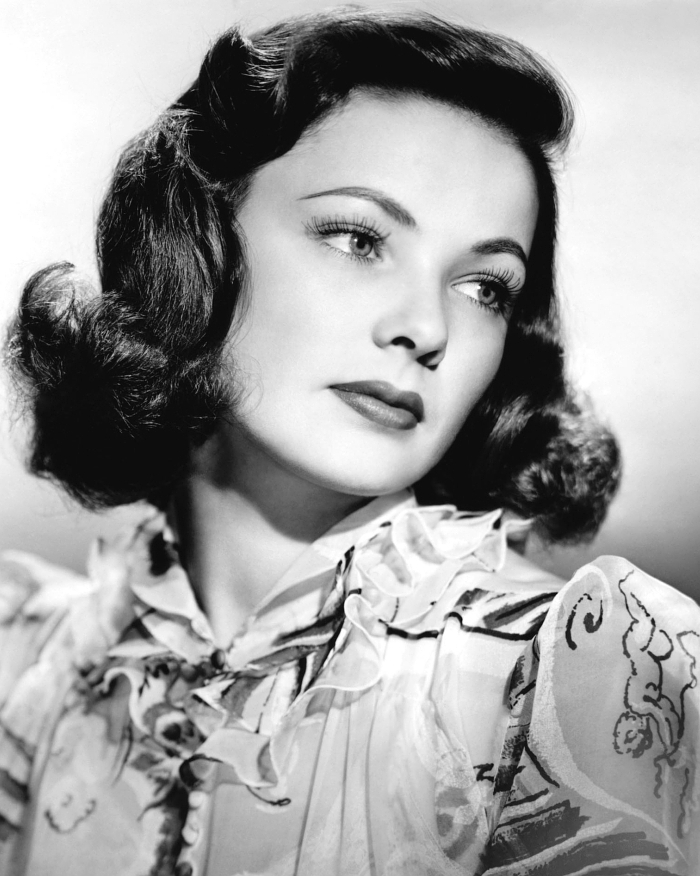
Gene Tierney as Victoria Charteris (aka Poppy Smith)

- Gene Tierney as Poppy Smith (Victoria Charteris)
- Walter Huston as Sir Guy Charteris (aka Victor Dawson)
- Victor Mature as "Doctor" Omar
- Ona Munson as "Mother" Gin Sling
- Phyllis Brooks as The Chorus Girl, Dixie Pomeroy
- Albert Bassermann as Van Elst
- Maria Ouspenskaya as The Amah
- Eric Blore as The Bookkeeper, Caesar Hawkins
- Ivan Lebedeff as The Gambler, Boris
- Mike Mazurki as The Coolie
- Clyde Fillmore as The Comprador, Percival Montgomery Howe
- Grayce Hampton as The Social Leader, Lady Blessington
- Rex Evans as The Counselor, Mr. Jackson
- Mikhail Rasumny as The Appraiser, Mischa Vaginisky
- Michael Dalmatoff as The Bartender
- Marcel Dalio as The Master of the Spinning Wheel, Marcel
- Leyland Hodgson as Ryerson

== Production ==
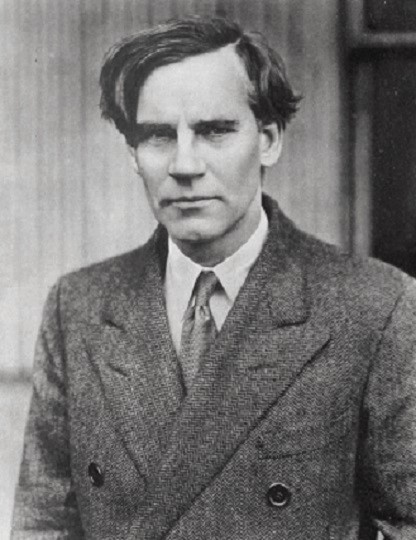
Walter Huston as Sir Guy Charteris

There were several attempts to turn the play The Shanghai Gesture into a film in the 1930s, one of them by Cecil B. DeMille, and another in the early 1930s by Edward Small at United Artists. By 1940, it was estimated there had been 32 previous attempts to film the play. Among the script changes in the film to appease the censor was the replacement of the Japanese character of Prince Oshima with Dr. Omar; the censor did not want the film to imply miscegenation. Filming began on August 11, 1941.

This listing of actors in the opening credits has an ending title card honoring the extras reading, "And a large cast of 'HOLLYWOOD EXTRAS' who without expecting credit or mention stand ready day and night to do their best—and who at their best are more than good enough to deserve mention." Keye Luke painted the mural displayed in the casino.

Victor Mature, in a 1941 interview with Duncan Underhill, reported the following exchange with von Sternberg directing him in Shanghai Gesture:

Von Sternberg [yelling]: “You are not a floorwalker in Shanghai’s Macy's. You are a sinister dope, understand, in a nice way. You are an innocent bush-league Mephisto.”

Mature: “What is a bush-league Mephisto? I don’t get it.”

Von Sternberg [barking]: “I am.”

Von Sternberg in his 1965 autobiography declared that The Shanghai Gesture,

“launched Gene Tierney and Victor Mature as stellar attractions. It also contained the superlative talents of Walter Huston, Albert Bassermann and Ona Munson.”

== Reception ==
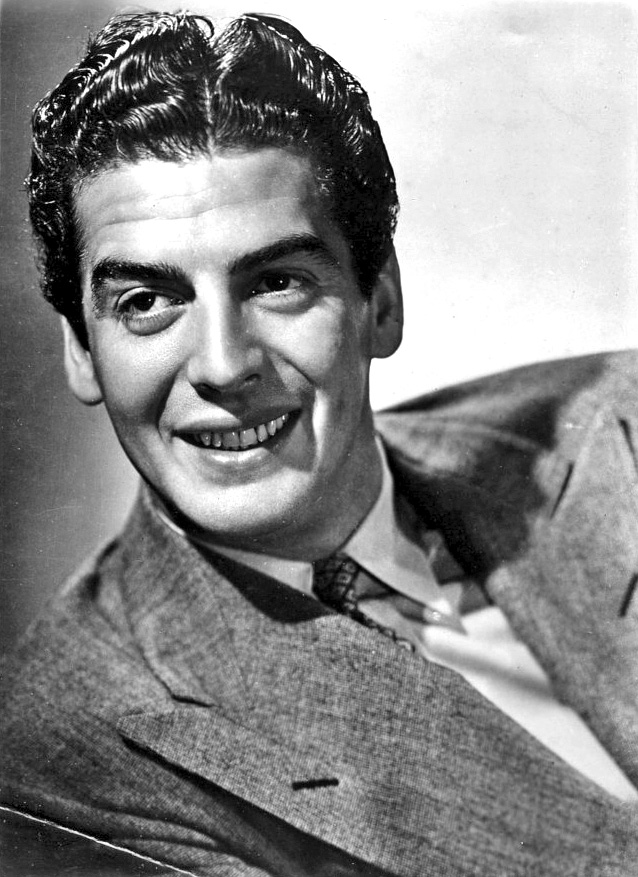
Victor Mature as Doctor Omar

Variety described The Shanghai Gesture as "a rather dull and hazy drama of the Orient."

"Victor Mature, as the matter-of-fact Arab despoiler of Tierney’s honor, provides a standout performance. Huston’s abilities are lost in the jumble, while Munson cannot penetrate the mask-like makeup arranged for her characterization."

Oleg Cassini later said "Both Gene and I were hopeful," about The Shanghai Gesture.

"A prestigious director, a good cast... perhaps this would lead to other opportunities. But the film was an overwrought turkey destroyed by the critics, who gave Gene her first bad reviews. My costumes were not even mentioned in passing."

In 2005, film critic Dennis Schwartz gave the film a positive review, writing,

"Josef von Sternberg's (The Scarlet Empress/The Blue Angel/The Devil is a Woman) last great Hollywood film is based on a 1925 play by John Colton that required over 30 revisions ordered by the Breen Office censors before it was deemed acceptable. In one unreleased censored version, attributed to writer Jules Furthman, the blemished noirish character named Mother Gin Sling is instead named Mother Goddamn and runs a brothel instead of a casino. What remains from all the cuts is the surreal baroque setting--a gesture to the descent of mankind into the bowels of the earth--a casino designed like Dante's Inferno. Despite the forced changes, this is still a delirious masterpiece of decadence and sexual depravity that surrounds itself with Eastern motifs that are meant to mystify rather than enlighten."

== Sources ==
- Sternberg, Josef von. 1988. Fun in a Chinese Laundry. Mercury House, San Francisco, California. ISBN 0-916515-37-0 (pbk.)
