= Children of Divorce (1927 film) =

1927 film

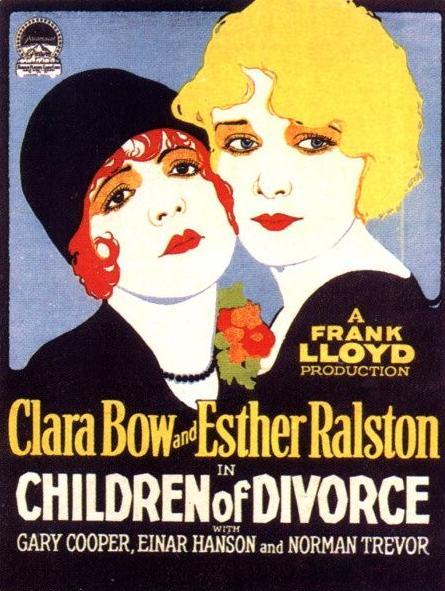
- Theatrical release poster
- Directed by: Frank Lloyd; Uncredited: Josef von Sternberg
- Written by: Louis D. Lighton; Hope Loring; Alfred Hustwick (titles)
- Story by: Adela Rogers St. Johns
- Based on: Children of Divorce by Owen Johnson
- Produced by: Jesse L. Lasky; E. Lloyd Sheldon; Adolph Zukor
- Starring: Clara Bow; Esther Ralston; Gary Cooper; Einar Hanson; Norman Trevor
- Cinematography: Norbert Brodine; Victor Milner; Uncredited: James Wong Howe
- Edited by: E. Lloyd Sheldon
- Production company: Famous Players–Lasky
- Distributed by: Paramount Pictures
- Release date: April 2, 1927 (USA)
- Running time: 70 minutes
- Country: United States
- Language: Silent (English intertitles)

Children of Divorce is a 1927 American silent romantic drama film directed by Frank Lloyd and starring Clara Bow, Esther Ralston, and Gary Cooper. Adapted from the 1927 novel of the same name by Owen Johnson, and written by Louis D. Lighton, Hope Loring, Alfred Hustwick, and Adela Rogers St. Johns, the film is about a young flapper who tricks her wealthy friend into marrying her during a night of drunken revelry. Even though she knows that he is in love with another woman, she refuses to grant him a divorce and repeat the mistake of her divorced parents. Produced by Jesse L. Lasky, E. Lloyd Sheldon, and Adolph Zukor for the Famous Players–Lasky, the film was released on April 25, 1927, by Paramount Pictures.

== Plot ==
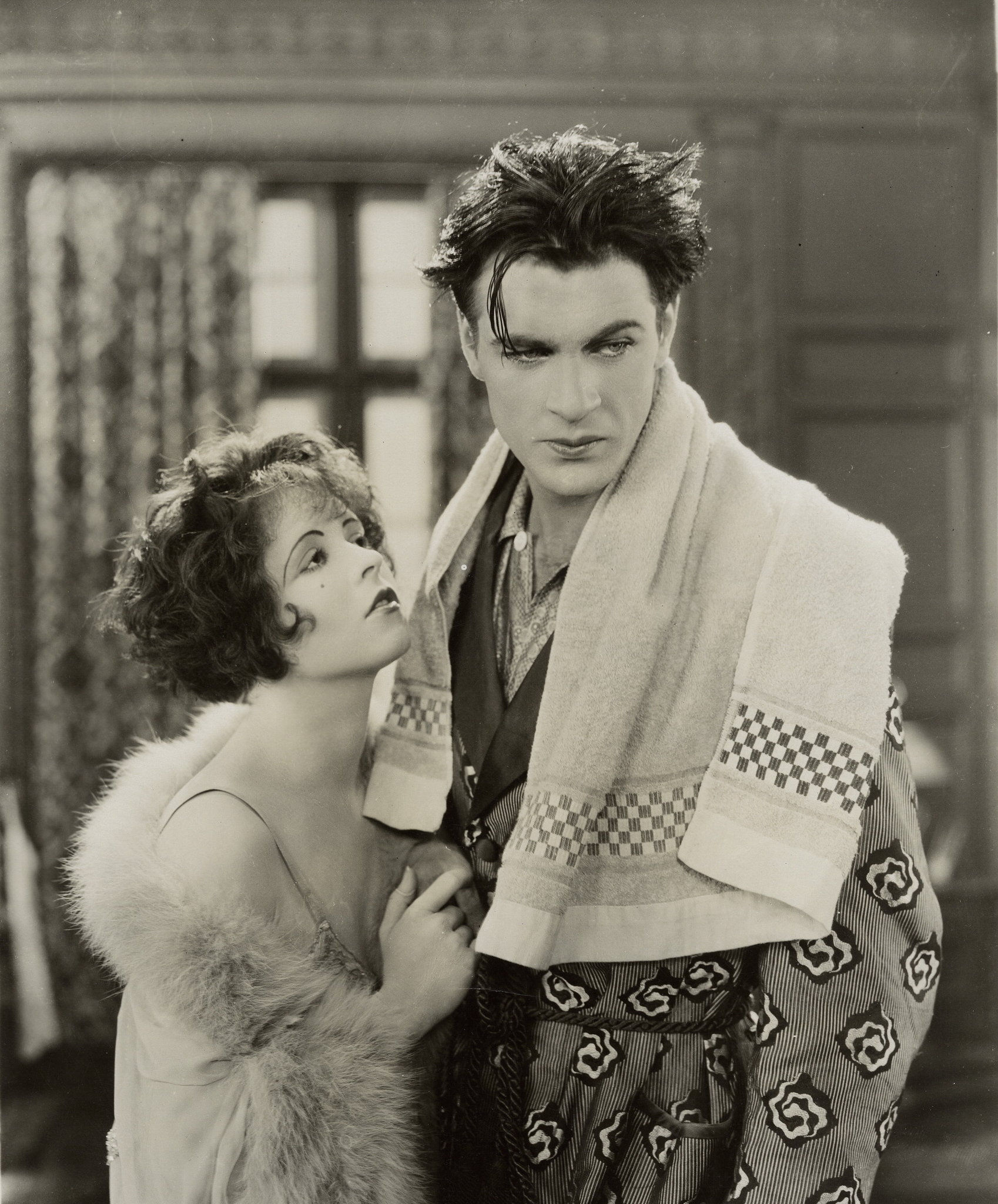
Clara Bow (Kitty Flanders) and Gary Cooper (Edward D. 'Ted' Larrabee)

Children of Divorce (1927)

As children, Jean Waddington and Kitty Flanders meet in a boarding school, both dropped off by their divorced parents as inconvenient children. One day Ted Larrabee, whose parents are also divorced, climbs over the school wall, and the three of them commiserate and pledge to never divorce.

After growing up, Ted and Kitty are friends in America. Jean returns from Europe, and Ted and Jean are fascinated by each other, to Kitty's dismay. At a party that night, Kitty tells her lover Prince Ludovico de Saxe that since he has no money, she can't marry him; and sets her sights on the wealthy Ted.

Ted proposes to Jean, but knowing that Ted's father was unfaithful to his wife and irresponsible, Jean demands that he prove himself before she accepts his proposal. Ted starts an architectural business designing bridges.

To celebrate the new business, Kitty shows up with their friends and a lot of booze, and Ted takes part in the revelry. The next morning, Ted arises finding that he and Kitty were married while on a drunken spree. Jean, still opposed to divorce, convinces Ted that he and Kitty can be happy together, and returns to Europe.

Several years later, Jean meets Ted and Kitty in Paris. Kitty sees that Jean is more kind to her daughter than she ever was. Realizing that both Ted and her daughter would be happier with Jean, and unwilling to get the divorce they all pledged to avoid, she poisons herself.

== Cast ==
- Clara Bow as Kitty Flanders
- Esther Ralston as Jean Waddington
- Gary Cooper as Edward D. 'Ted' Larrabee
- Einar Hanson as Prince Ludovico de Saxe
- Norman Trevor as Duke Henri de Goncourt
- Hedda Hopper as Katherine Flanders
- Edward Martindel as Tom Larrabee
- Julia Swayne Gordon as Princess de Saxe
- Tom Ricketts as The Secretary
- Albert Gran as Mr. Seymour
- Iris Stuart as Mousie
- Margaret Campbell as Mother Superior
- Percy Williams as Manning
- Joyce Coad as Little Kitty
- Yvonne Pelletier as Little Jean

== Production ==
Director Frank Lloyd's film was deemed commercially nonviable by Paramount publicists. With one million dollars already invested in the picture, studio executives were loath to shelve the production. Josef von Sternberg, recently enlisted as an assistant director at Paramount, was tasked with “salvaging” Children of Divorce by rewriting the text of the intertitles. Von Sternberg, in his 1965 autobiography, reports that he declined the intertitle revision, but assured producer B. P. Schulberg that he could “[reshoot] half the film in three days and turn over a successful version to him.” Schulberg accepted the offer.

As all the stages on Paramount lot were occupied, the remake was executed in a large tent erected for that purpose, with portions of the old set transferred from storage. After “three days and three nights” the director, actors and crew delivered a product that ranked high in box office returns in 1925. Von Sternberg remarked: “An ice-cold million dollars had been warmed up.”

== Preservation ==
A print of Children of Divorce is located in the collection of the Library of Congress.

== Sources ==
- Dickens, Homer (1970). The Films of Gary Cooper. New York: Citadel Press. pp. 52–53. ISBN 978-0806500102.
- Meyers, Jeffrey (1998). Gary Cooper: An American Hero. New York: William Morrow and Company. ISBN 978-0688154943.
- Sternberg, Josef von. 1988. Fun in a Chinese Laundry. Mercury House, San Francisco, California. ISBN 0-916515-37-0 (pbk.)
