= 1923 in Nordic music =

The following is a list of notable events and compositions of the year 1923 in Nordic music.

== Events ==
- 19 February – The world première of Jean Sibelius's Symphony No. 6 is premièred in Helsinki, conducted by the composer.
- unknown date – Helmer Alexandersson is elected to the Föreningen Svenska Tonsättare (Society of Swedish composers).

== New works ==
- Hugo Alfvén – Vallvisa
- Rued Langgaard – Antikrist (opera)
- Carl Nielsen – Prelude, Theme and Variations, Op. 48

== Popular music ==
- Hugo Alfvén – "Limu, limu, lima" (herding song)
- Emil Norlander & John Redland – "Den gula paviljongen"

== Film music ==
- Helmer Alexandersson – Gunnar Hedes saga

== Births ==
- 20 January – Nora Brockstedt, Norwegian jazz and pop singer (died 2015)
- 10 June – Aase Nordmo Løvberg, Norwegian opera singer (died 2013)
- 1 August – Erling Stordahl, Norwegian singer and farmer (died 1994)
- 7 August – Uffe Baadh, Danish jazz drummer (died 1980)
- 11 August – Ellen Winther, Danish opera singer and Eurovision participant (died 2011)
- 17 November – Margareta Sjöstedt, Swedish operatic contralto (died 2012)

== Deaths ==
- 17 February – Wilhelmina Gelhaar, Swedish operatic soprano (born 1837)
- 13 July – Asger Hamerik, Danish composer (born 1843)
- 19 September – Sophus Andersen, Danish composer and music critic (born 1859)
- 7 November – Ludvig Hegner, Danish composer (born 1859)
- 31 December – Olaus Andreas Grøndahl, Norwegian conductor, singing teacher, and composer (born 1847)

== See also ==
- 1923 in Denmark
- 1923 in Iceland
- 1923 in Norwegian music
- 1923 in Sweden
