= Sir Arne's Treasure =

1919 film

Herr Arnes pengar
- Theatrical release poster
- Directed by: Mauritz Stiller
- Screenplay by: Mauritz Stiller; Gustaf Molander
- Based on: The Treasure by Selma Lagerlöf
- Starring: Richard Lund; Mary Johnson; Hjalmar Selander; Concordia Selander
- Cinematography: Julius Jaenzon
- Music by: Helmer Alexandersson
- Production company: Svenska Biografteatern
- Distributed by: Svenska Biografteatern
- Release date: 22 September 1919
- Running time: 122 minutes
- Country: Sweden
- Languages: Silent; Swedish intertitles

Sir Arne's Treasure (1919) by Mauritz Stiller

Sir Arne's Treasure (Swedish: Herr Arnes pengar) is a 1919 Swedish silent crime-drama film directed and co-written by Mauritz Stiller, starring Richard Lund, Hjalmar Selander, Concordia Selander and Mary Johnson. It is based on the novel The Treasure by Selma Lagerlöf, the first woman to win the Nobel Prize in Literature, originally published in 1903. The story takes place on the Swedish west coast during the 16th century, and revolves around a Scottish mercenary who murders a wealthy family for treasure, only to unwittingly begin a relationship with the surviving daughter of the family.

== Plot ==
After discovering a conspiracy among his Scottish mercenaries, king Johan III of Sweden orders them to leave the country and puts their commanders in jail. Sir Archie, Sir Filip and Sir Donald, three of the imprisoned commanders, escape and flee to Marstrand, then under Danish rule, in hope of being able to return to Scotland.

Sir Arne of Solberga is introduced as a vicar and wealthy man who is said to be under a curse as his treasure - a chest full of silver coins - is said to have been looted from the monasteries during the Protestant reform and, according to premonitions, will one day be his doom. While dining, Arne's wife has a premonition that three rogues are sharpening very long knives nearby, but is not taken seriously. At night, however, the three mercenaries enter the family's mansion, murder the family, steal Sir Arne's treasure chest and burn down the building. The only survivor is the daughter, Elsalill.

Elsalill is taken care of by a travelling fishmonger who happens to be there and lets her live with him and his mother in Marstrand, where the Scottish officers have arrived and are waiting for the ice to break so they can sail away. Elsalill encounters Sir Archie, and they fall in love without recognising each other. Eventually however, Elsalill happens to overhear a conversation between the Scots, and understands who they are. She reports them to the town guard but the three repel the guard trying to arrest them as they are backed up by other mercenaries who are also waiting for the first ship to leave. Sir Archie seeks Elsahill to try to persuade her to come to Scotland and explains that he deeply regrets his crime but, as the town guard attack, Elsalill is fatally wounded when Sir Archie uses her as a human shield.

Sir Archie escapes to the frozen-in ship with Elsalill's body. The ice still hasn't broken however, and according to sailor's lore it is because there are evildoers on board, a fact confirmed by the fishmonger seeking Elsahill. The three officers are identified and thrown off the ship. A long procession march over the ice ensues to fetch Elsalill's body and bring it back to land.

== Cast ==
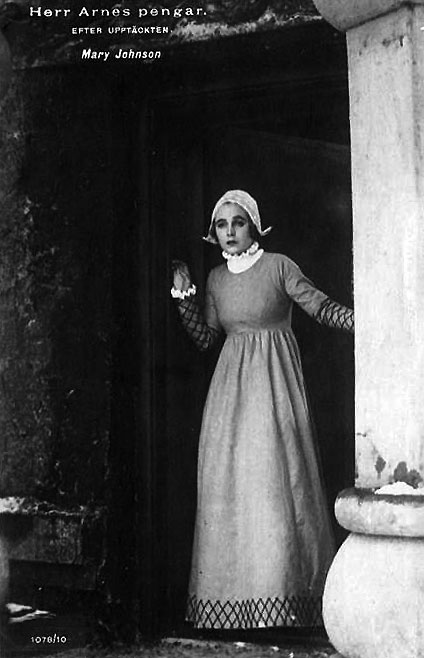
Johnson in the film

- Richard Lund as Sir Archie
- Mary Johnson as Elsalill
- Hjalmar Selander as Sir Arne
- Concordia Selander as Sir Arne's wife
- Wanda Rothgardt as Berghild
- Axel Nilsson as Torarin
- Erik Stocklassa as Sir Filip
- Bror Berger as Sir Donald
- Josua Bengtson as Jailer

== Production ==
The first plan for a film adaption of Selma Lagerlöf's The Treasure at Svenska Biografteatern, the dominating production company in Sweden during the silent era, was in 1915, but fell through. In 1917 a stage adaptation of the story premiered at Deutsches Theater in Berlin, and an offer was received from a German film company which wanted to adapt it. After the play was staged in Gothenburg the following year, Svenska Biografteatern decided to go ahead and produce the film themselves. The screenplay by Mauritz Stiller and Gustaf Molander differs from the novel in that it tells the story in a more strictly chronological order, and incorporates some details which were introduced in the German play. Stiller also chose to tone down the story's supernatural elements.

Filming took place from 12 February to 10 May 1919, in the studio area of Svenska Filmbiografen, later AB Svensk Filmindustri, on Lidingö, Stockholm, where the alleys of Marstrand had been reconstructed. Other exterior scenes were shot in the nearby area on Lidingö and Lilla Värtan, as well as around Furusund in the Stockholm archipelago, where the ship had been left over the winter and frozen in. Some filming took place further north in Skutskär, and around Sollefteå in Ångermanland.

The film featured handwritten intertitles by Alva Lundin and was the first film to use her artistic title cards.

== Other adaptations ==
Two other film adaptations of the story exist. In 1954 Gustaf Molander directed another Swedish version. A Czechoslovak animated short film directed by Václav Bedřich was made in 1967.
