= Alma Söderhjelm =

Finnish historian (1870–1949)

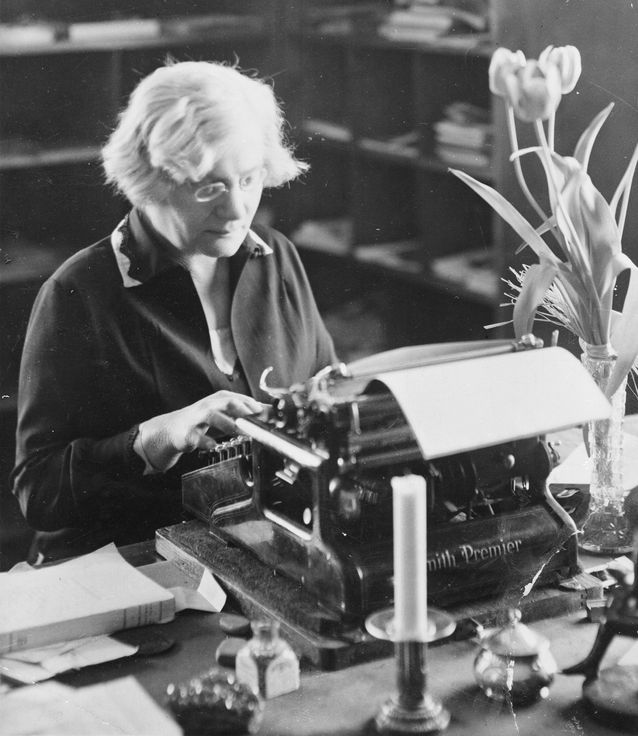
Alma Söderhjelm.

Alma Söderhjelm (10 May 1870 in Vyborg – 16 March 1949 in Saltsjöbaden, Sweden) was a Swedish-speaking Finnish historian and the first woman to hold a professorship in Finland. She was the daughter of the district judge and procurator Werner Woldemar Söderhjelm and Amanda Olivia Clouberg.

== Academic career ==
After gaining an M.A. in history from the University of Helsinki in 1894, Söderhjelm spent three years in Paris, encouraged by her family, her elder brother Professor Werner Söderhjelm, and her teacher J. R. Danielson-Kalmari. There she collected material for a doctoral dissertation on the French Revolution under the supervision of Alphonse Aulard, the leading scholar of the Revolution at the time. The dissertation examined journalism during the French Revolution and was published as Le Régime de la presse pendant la Révolution française. She was awarded a doctorate in 1900.

On the basis of this thesis, the university unanimously proposed to award her a lectureship. This appointment was delayed until 1906, because of political concern over her father, the procurator Werner Woldemar Söderhjelm, and her brother. The Emperor was also concerned that if a woman became a lecturer in Finland, the same demand would be made in Russia. Before the appointment came through, she published an essay collection on the cultural history of the Revolution and a selection of letters by Manon Roland. The appointment was eventually approved in spring 1906, when the acting chancellor August Langhoff submitted a new proposal that the Emperor accepted.

In 1906, she finally became the first female docent (adjunct professor) in Finland, a position she held until 1926. In 1913, she was denied permission to apply for a vacant ordinary professorship in history, on the grounds that women could not take the judicial oath required of university senate members. Her case prompted a revision of the legislation, opening professorships to women — though by the time the change came into effect, the post she had sought was already filled.

In 1927, she became chair and Extraordinary Professor of General History at Åbo Akademi University, and thus the first female professor in Finland, a role she held until 1938. The chair was made possible by the benefactor Ellen Dahlström, a commercial councillor's widow who funded its establishment.

Her major academic works on the revolutionary period include Sverige och den franska revolutionen (Sweden and the French Revolution, 1920–24). Her academic work also involved editing the correspondence of the French Queen Marie Antoinette with the Swedish nobleman von Fersen, published as Fersen et Marie-Antoinette (1930), and with some French revolutionaries, such as the correspondence with Antoine Barnave published in Marie-Antoinette et Barnave. Correspondance secrete (1934). She also edited and published the diary of Axel von Fersen in three volumes (1925–28). Later in her career, she co-authored a biography of Oscar I with Carl-Fredrik Palmstierna (1944) and wrote biographies of Georg Carl von Döbeln (1937) and Carl Johan (1939).

== Other activities ==
Söderhjelm worked as a journalist, contributing to several newspapers and writing a column for the newspaper Åbo Underrättelser. She also wrote novels such as Unga träd (Young Trees, 1925), poetry, including the collection Tjugu små dikter (Twenty Small Poems, 1920), and a five-volume memoir which included the titles Min värld (My World, 1929–31) and Minä sju magra är (My Seven Lean Years, 1932). She co-wrote the screenplay for The Blizzard (1923), directed by Mauritz Stiller. She was awarded the Granberg Prize in 1919, 1928, 1932, 1935, and 1942.

Söderhjelm was politically active. She smuggled journals into Finland from Sweden, and helped military volunteers to move from Sweden into Germany.
