= Thecla Åhlander =

Swedish actress (1855–1925)

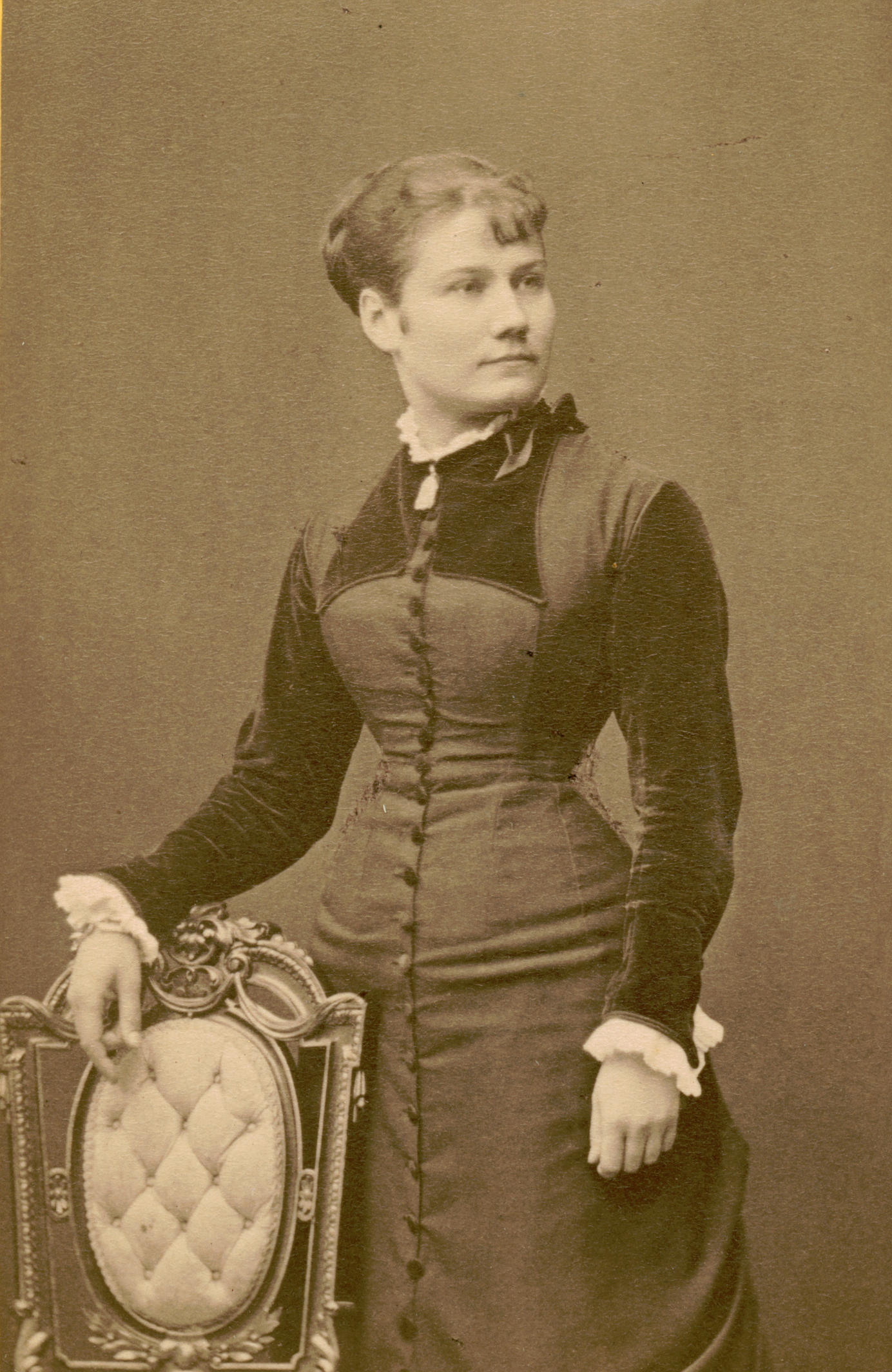
- Åhlander in 1880
- Born: Thekla Ottilia Åhlander; 3 June 1855; Norrköping, Sweden-Norway
- Died: 8 April 1925 (aged 69); Täby, Sweden
- Occupation: Actress
- Years active: 1877–1923

Thecla Ottilia Åhlander (3 June 1855 – 8 April 1925) was a Swedish stage and film actress whose career began on the stage in the late 19th century and lasted through the early 1920s.

== Life and career ==
Thecla Åhlander was born in Norrköping and initially studied drama as pupil of Frans Hedberg in 1872. She continued her studies at the Royal Dramatic Theatre School from 1874 to 1877. She made her stage debut at the Royal Dramatic Theatre in 1877 in a play titled Ett namn. She was engaged at the theatre until 1922 and from 1908 to 1915 was also a drama teacher at the theatre. Åhlander became one of Scandinavia's premier stage actresses, appearing in roles by Henrik Ibsen, Bjørnstjerne Bjørnson, Ludvig Holberg, August Blanche, Axel Emil Betzonich, amongst others. She became the theatre's premier actress in 1888 and received the Litteris et Artibus in 1891. In November 1922, her 50-year career as a stage actress celebrated with a jubilee.

Åhlander also appeared in three Swedish silent films in the early 1920s, including Gunnar Klintberg's 1921 Elisabet and Mauritz Stiller's 1923 Gunnar Hedes saga. She played Dick's mother in Victor Sjöström's 1923 film The Hell Ship (Swedish: Eld ombord). In a review for Dagens Nyheter, Elsa Jonason described the scenes featuring Åhlander as the film's most beautiful.

She died on 8 April 1925 after several months of illness.
