= The Blizzard (1923 film) =

1923 film by Mauritz Stiller

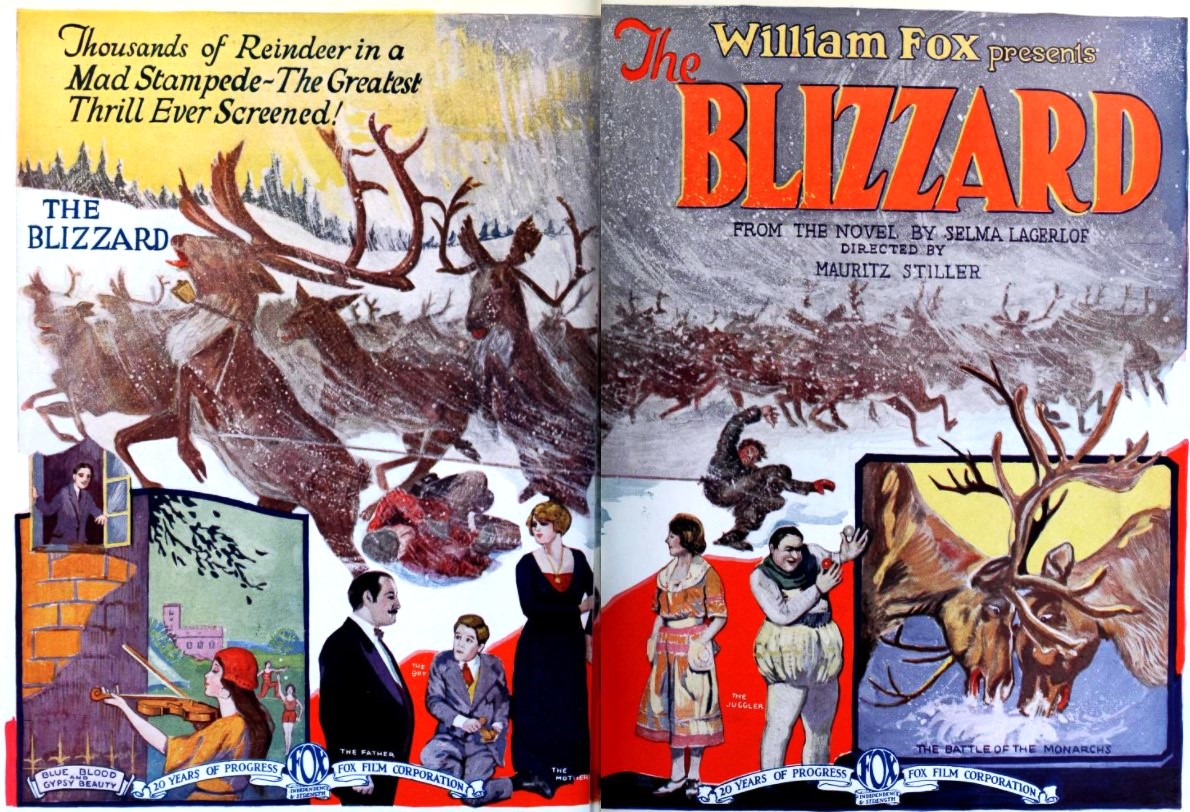
- American advertisement
- Directed by: Mauritz Stiller
- Screenplay by: Mauritz Stiller; Alma Söderhjelm
- Based on: The Tale of a Manor by Selma Lagerlöf
- Produced by: Charles Magnusson
- Starring: Einar Hanson; Mary Johnson; Pauline Brunius; Stina Berg; Hugo Björne
- Cinematography: Julius Jaenzon
- Music by: Helmer Alexandersson
- Production company: AB Svensk Filminspelning
- Distributed by: AB Svenska Biografteaterns Filmbyrå
- Release date: 1 January 1923
- Running time: 101 minutes
- Country: Sweden
- Language: Silent (Swedish intertitles)

The Blizzard is a 1923 Swedish drama film directed by Mauritz Stiller, starring Einar Hanson, Mary Johnson, Pauline Brunius, and Hugo Björne. The film's original Swedish title is Gunnar Hedes saga, which means "The story of Gunnar Hede". The narrative revolves around a student who aspires to be a professional musician. After his father's sudden death, he has to shift his attention to try and save his family's mansion which is facing bankruptcy. The film is loosely based on the Selma Lagerlöf novel The Tale of a Manor.

Full movie

== Cast ==
- Einar Hanson as Gunnar Hede
- Pauline Brunius as Mrs. Hede, Gunnar's mother
- Hugo Björne as Mr. Hede, Gunnar's father
- Mary Johnson as Ingrid
- Adolf Olschansky as Mr. Blomgren
- Stina Berg as Mrs. Blomgren
- Thecla Åhlander as Stava
- Gustav Aronson as Bailiff
- Julia Cederblad as Auktionsspekulant
- Lotten Olsson as Auktionsspekulant
- Gösta Hillberg as Lawyer
- Concordia Selander
- Ingeborg Strandin as Tjänstekvinna på munkhyttan

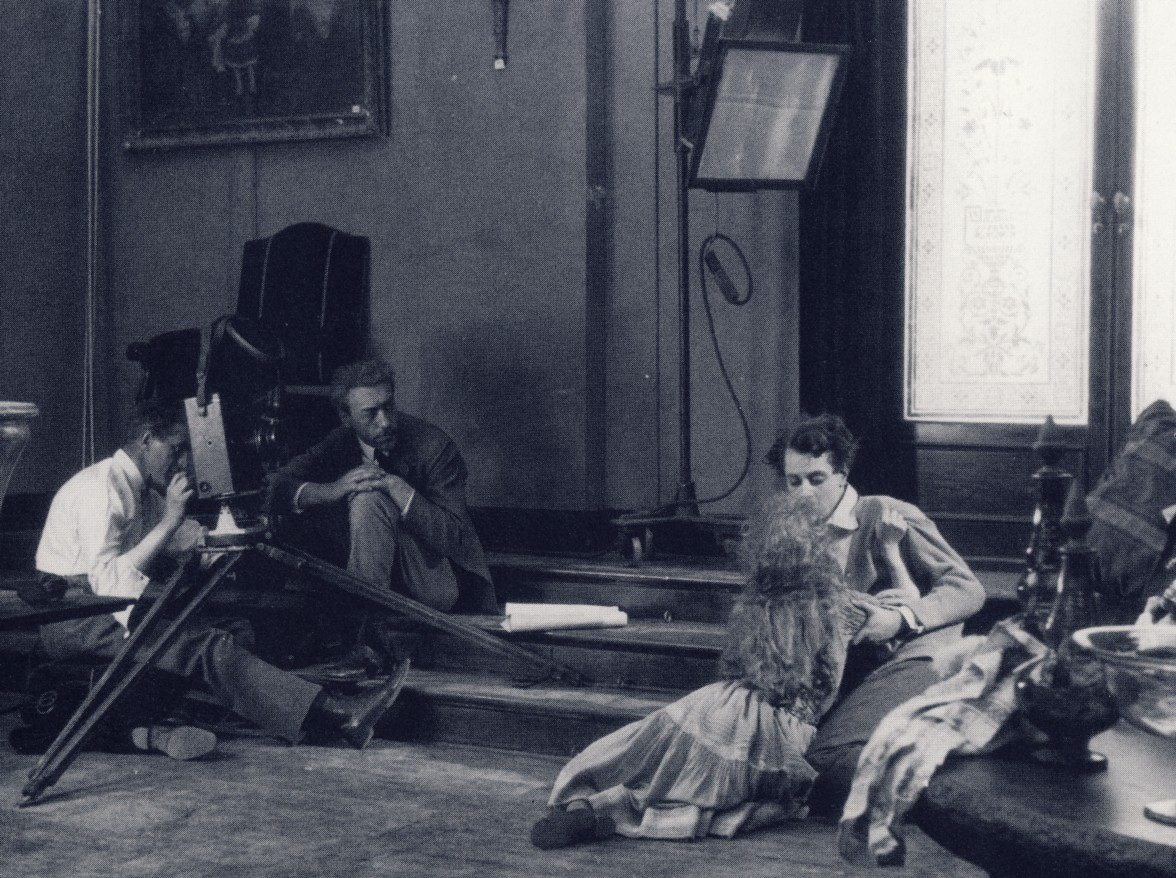
Cinematographer Julius Jaenzon, Mauritz Stiller, Mary Johnson, and Einar Hanson during the production of the film

== Production ==
AB Svensk Filmindustri (SF) had initially tried to make a film adaptation of Selma Lagerlöf's The Tale of a Manor in 1915, and Gustaf Molander had developed a screenplay. The film was however cancelled. In the early 1920s the plans were revived and the project was given to Mauritz Stiller, who is credited as writer together with the Finnish-Swedish author Alma Söderhjelm. The screenplay differs from the original story in several regards, and the opening titles call it a "free adaptation" of the novel. Just like Stiller had done when he made his previous Lagerlöf adaptation, Sir Arne's Treasure, and Victor Sjöström had done with his, Stiller travelled to Lagerlöf and presented the screenplay to have it approved. Lagerlöf was however deeply dissatisfied with the liberties Stiller had taken, and the production company had to convince her to not denounce the film publicly. The film was produced through AB Svensk Filminspelning, a subsidiary of SF which only existed from 1922 to 1923.

Lars Hanson was originally cast in the role of Gunnar Hede, but was replaced by Einar Hanson soon before production started. This was Einar Hanson's first leading role in a film. Principal photography took place between February and June 1922 in the Filmstaden studios. Exteriors were shot in the surrounding area, Nacka, and Kallsjön in Jämtland.

== Release ==
The film premiered on 1 January 1923. The film was sold to 17 markets abroad, which was significantly fewer than Stiller's five previous films. The Blizzard is partially lost; only about two thirds of the original film are still known to exist.

== See also ==
- 1923 in film
- Cinema of Sweden
