= The Treasure (novel) =

1904 novel by Selma Lagerlöf

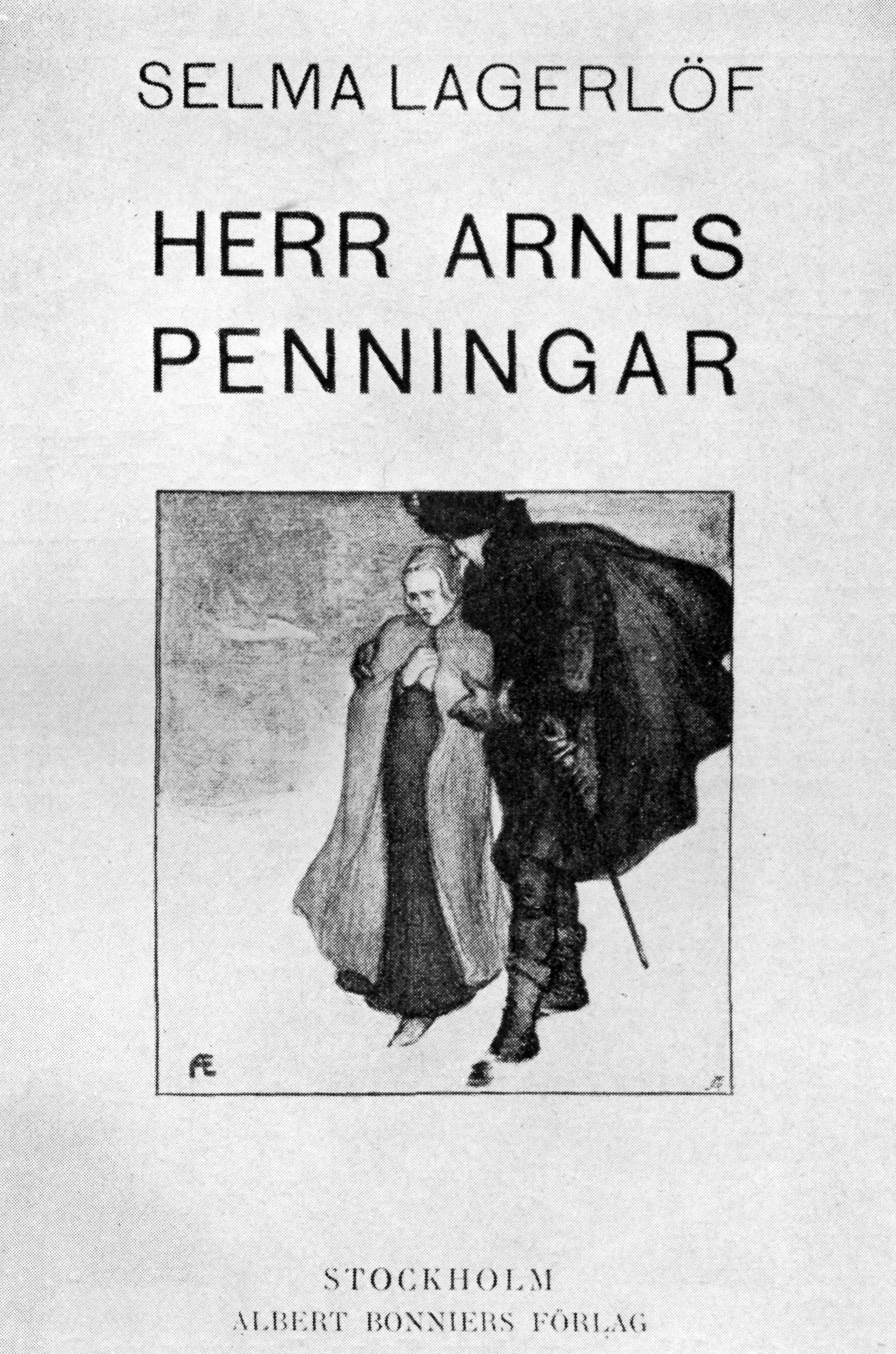
- Author: Selma Lagerlöf
- Original title: Herr Arnes penningar
- Translator: Arthur G. Chater
- Language: Swedish
- Publisher: Bonniers
- Publication date: 1904
- Publication place: Sweden
- English publication date: 1923
- Pages: 150

The Treasure is a 1904 novel by the Swedish writer Selma Lagerlöf. Its original Swedish title is Herr Arnes penningar, which means "Mr. Arne's money". It has also been published in English as Herr Arne's Hoard. In 1973, lesbian feminist publisher Daughters, Inc. reprinted the novel in English. Set in Bohuslän in the 16th century, The Treasure tells the story of a group of Scottish mercenaries who escape from prison; they go on to murder a family to steal a treasure chest, after which one of them falls in love with the family's sole survivor.

Lagerlöf based the novel on a true story that she heard told in the Solberga parish (Solbergatrakten), about a Mr. Arne who had been murdered at Solberga vicarage on February 15, 1586.

== Adaptations ==
The novel has been adapted for film three times: by Mauritz Stiller in 1919 as Sir Arne's Treasure, by Gustaf Molander in 1954 as Herr Arnes penningar, and as Poklad pana Arna in a 1967 Czechoslovak animated short film by Václav Bedřich.

== See also ==
- 1904 in literature
- Swedish literature
