= Dale Pendell =

American writer (1947–2018)

- Born: April 14, 1947
- Died: January 13, 2018 (aged 70)
- Occupations: Writer, poet, ethnobotanist
- Years active: 1971–2018
- Notable work: Pharmako/Poeia (1994); Pharmako/Dynamis (2002); Pharmako/Gnosis (2005)

Dale Pendell (April 14, 1947 – 13 January 2018) was an American poet, ethnobotanist, and novelist. Writing in an evocative style all his own, he fused science, folklore, and poetry in describing the relationship between psychoactive plants and human beings. A longtime student of ethnobotany, Pendell discussed historical and cultural uses of "power plants" in his works. He read and distilled the literature of pharmacology and neuroscience, of ethnobotany and anthropology, of mythology and political economics as they intersect with the direct experience of human psychoactive use.

His publications include the Pharmako Trilogy: Pharmako/Poeia (1994), Pharmako/Dynamis (2002), and Pharmako/Gnosis (2005), all published by Mercury House. He covered all the major categories of psychoactives and detailed the use, the pharmacology, the chemistry, the political and social historical implications and effects of the use of psychoactives. Pharmako/Poeia won a 1996 Firecracker Alternative Book Award.

He was also a myth critic. Certain of his works comment on the origins of cultural myths.

Pendell also delved into politics, introducing the concept of "horizon anarchism" at his Burning Man 2006 Palenque Norte lecture.

== Bibliography ==
- The Gold-Dust Wilderness (1971)
- Physics for the Heart (1985)
- Chasing the Cranes, with Steve Sanfield, (1986)
- City Limits Blues (1986)
- Rough Cuts & Kindling (1986)
- Swirling (1986)
- Mokujiki: Thirteen Tanka, with Kazuaki Tanahashi, (1988)
- Pharmako/Poeia: Plant Powers, Poisons, and Herbcraft (1995, Mercury House)
- Living With Barbarians: A Few Plant Poems (1999)
- Pharmako/Dynamis: Stimulating Plants, Potions, & Herbcraft (2002, Mercury House)
- Pharmako/Gnosis: Plant Teachers and the Poison Path (2006, Mercury House)
- Inspired Madness: the Gifts of Burning Man (2006)
- Walking with Nobby, Conversations with Norman O. Brown (2008, Mercury House)
- The Language of Birds, Some Notes on Chance and Divination (2009)
- The Great Bay: Chronicles of the Collapse (2010, North Atlantic Books)
- Equations of Power (2013)
- Salting the Boundaries (2014)
- Seeking Faust (2014)
- Jeremy and the Mantis (2018, Mercury House)
