= Barbed Wire (1927 film) =

1927 American silent romance film

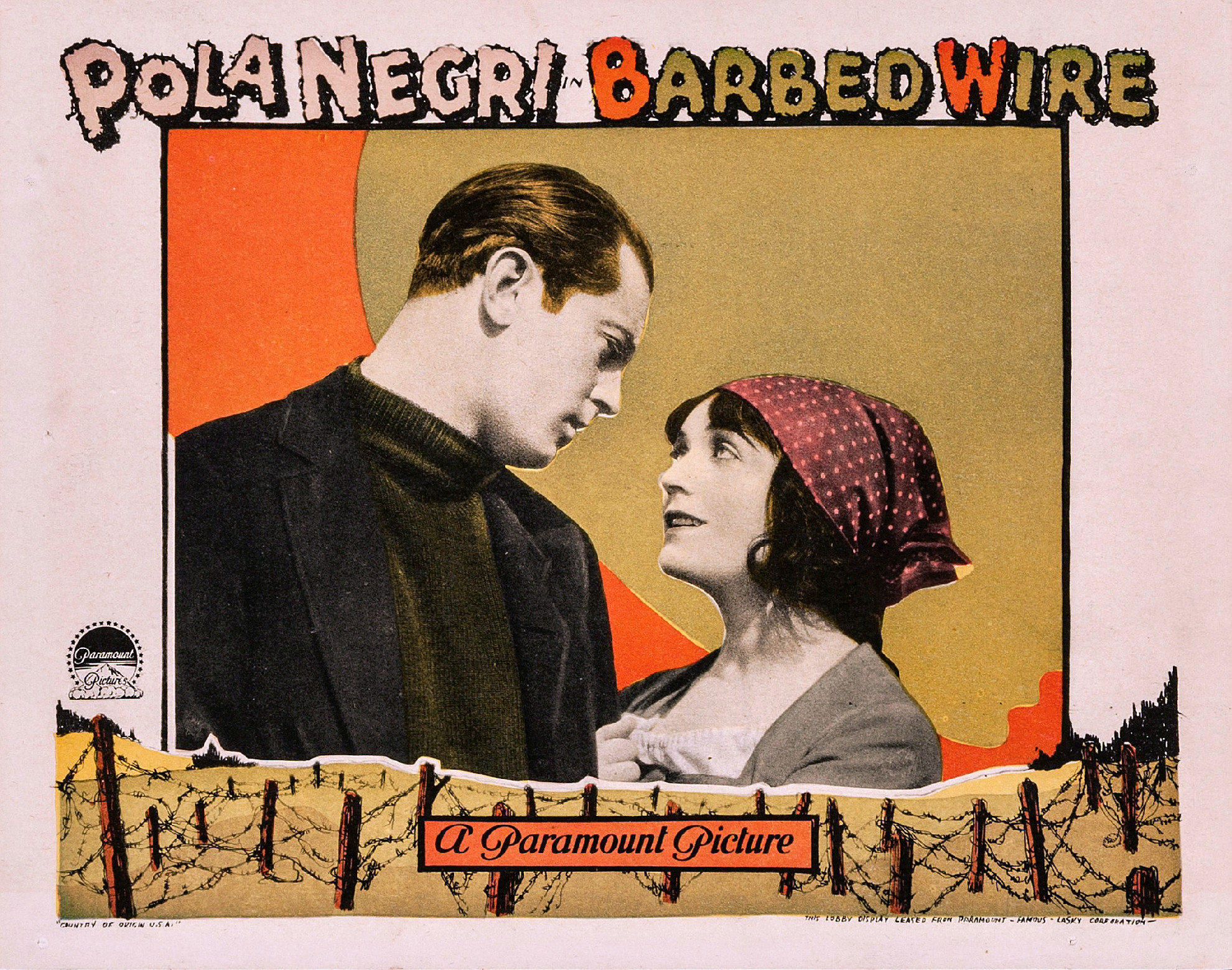
- Lobby card
- Directed by: Rowland V. Lee; Mauritz Stiller (uncredited)
- Written by: Rowland V. Lee (adaptation); Jules Furthman
- Based on: The Woman of Knockaloe by Hall Caine
- Produced by: Rowland V. Lee; Erich Pommer; Jesse L. Lasky
- Starring: Pola Negri; Clive Brook
- Cinematography: Bert Glennon
- Production company: Famous Players–Lasky
- Distributed by: Paramount Pictures
- Release date: September 10, 1927
- Running time: 7 reels (67-79 minutes)
- Country: United States
- Language: Silent (English intertitles)

Barbed Wire (full film)

Barbed Wire is a 1927 American silent romance film set in World War I. It stars Pola Negri as a French farmgirl and Clive Brook as the German prisoner of war she falls in love with. The film was based on the 1923 novel The Woman of Knockaloe by Hall Caine. Unlike the original novel, which is set at the Knockaloe internment camp in the Isle of Man, the film takes place in Normandy, France. Some plot alterations were made in the adaptation, including most importantly the insertion of a happy ending.

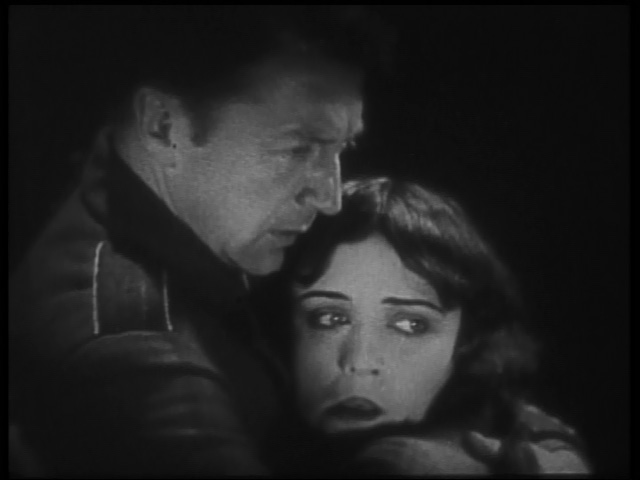
Pola Negri and Clive Brook

== Cast ==
- Pola Negri as Mona Moreau
- Clive Brook as Oskar Muller
- Claude Gillingwater as Jean Moreau
- Einar Hanson as André Joseph Moreau
- Clyde Cook as Hans
- Gustav von Seyffertitz as Pierre Corlet
- Charles Willis Lane as Colonel Duval
- Ben Hendricks Jr. as Sergeant Caron

== Reception ==
Despite the central peaceful message of both the film and the novel, the British audience reacted to the film with an upsurge of anti-German sentiment. Incensed by this, Hall Caine wrote to The Sunday Times objecting to the ‘monstrous’ and ‘malicious’ misrepresentation by ‘certain sections of the press’, which described the plot as ‘pro-German’.
