= John Brandi =

American writer

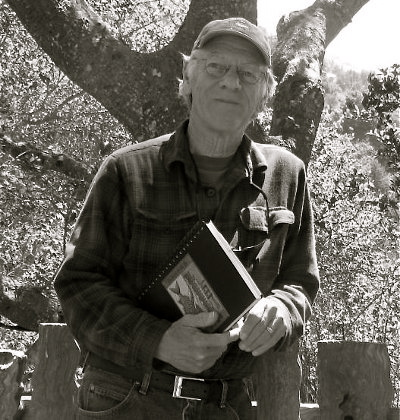
- John Brandi
- Born: November 5, 1943 (age 81); Los Angeles, California, U.S.
- Occupation(s): Poet, Travel Writer, Painter, Educator

John Brandi (born November 5, 1943, Los Angeles, California) is an American poet and artist. San Francisco Poet Laureate Jack Hirschman has said of Brandi:

He has been an open roader for much of his life and like his two great forebears, Whitman and Neruda, has named the minute particulars, the details of his sojournings … infusing them with a whole gamut of feelings— compassionate, mischievous, loving and righteous. It's what's made his poetry one of the solid bodies of work that's emerged from the North American West since the '60s.

== Life ==
Brandi is a native of Southern California. He studied art and anthropology at California State University, Northridge, and graduated in 1965. There he met poets Jack Hirschman and Eric Barker, as well as singer Pete Seeger, who encouraged him towards social work. As a Peace Corps volunteer, he lived in Ecuador from 1966 -1968, where he worked with Quechua farmers in their struggle for land rights. In the Andes he began publishing his poems in hand-sewn mimeograph editions, a trend that preceded the alternative press movement. Returning to the United States, he protested the American War in Vietnam, moved to Alaska, then Mexico, and finally to California's Sierra Nevada mountains, where he met poet and environmental activist Gary Snyder. In 1971 a key member of the San Francisco Renaissance, David Meltzer, published Brandi's first collection of prose poems, Desde Alla. That same year, Brandi left California for New Mexico, built a hand-hewn cabin in the northern mountains, and founded Tooth of Time Books, a small press devoted to poetry.

During his early years in the American Southwest, John Brandi traveled with Japanese poet Nanao Sakaki, compiled That Back Road In, and began teaching as an itinerant poet in Poetry-in-the-Schools programs throughout the western U.S. and Alaska. In 1979 he made the first of many excursions to India and the Himalayas to retrace his father's journey as a soldier in the India-Burma Theater. An elegy for his father and a tribute to poet Nanao Sakaki were included in his book Reflections in the Lizard’s Eye: notes from the high desert. In 1980 Brandi received a National Endowment for the Arts Fellowship for Poetry.

John Brandi has remained a resident of New Mexico, where he continues his rural lifestyle. An ardent traveler, he has sought source and renewal in the geography and peoples of the American Southwest and in distant lands. He has given readings of his poetry throughout the U.S. and overseas, including venues in Paris, Kyoto, Guadalajara and northern India. He has been a guide and lecturer for university students studying in Mexico, Java and Bali. In 2007 he co-curated “Jack Kerouac and the Writer’s Life,” an exhibit at the Palace of the Governor's, Santa Fe, New Mexico. In 2009 he gave the keynote address for the Haiku North America conference in Ottawa, Canada, followed by lectures at Punjab University, India, the University of California Bancroft Library, the New Mexico History Museum, and the Upaya Zen Center.

== Work ==
As a poet, Brandi owes much to his predecessors of the Beat tradition, and to poets as diverse as Federico García Lorca and the Japanese haiku master Matsuo Basho. Brandi's writing has been published both in trade and small-press editions, with noteworthy contributions in the realm of illustrated, hand-colored books printed on hand-operated presses. As a visual artist, his mixed-media paintings are enhanced with earth pigments, collage and plant dyes. He was introduced to the world of art and travel by his parents who gave him a notebook and pencils as a young boy, walked him through the Sierra Nevada meadows, encouraged him to observe keenly, draw, and write what he experienced.[3] John Brandi's many books, published in the U.S. and India, include poetry, travel vignettes, essays, modern American haiku and haibun. A complete selection of his publications may be found at UC Berkeley Special Collections, Brown University Library, University at Buffalo Special Collections, and at the Fray Angélico Chávez History Library, Santa Fe, NM.

== Bibliography ==
=== Poetry ===
- The Great Unrest (White Pine, 2019)
- Pa'Siempre: Cuba Poems (with Renée Gregorio; Tres Chicas Books, 2016)
- The World, the World (White Pine, 2013)
- Facing High Water (White Pine, 2008)
- In What Disappears (White Pine, 2003)
- Heartbeat Geography: Selected & Uncollected Poems (White Pine, 1995)
- Shadow Play: poems 1987-1991 (Light and Dust, 1992)
- Hymn for a Night Feast: poems 1979-1986 (Holy Cow!, 1989)
- That Back Road In (Wingbow, 1985)
- Narrowgauge to Riobamba (Christopher's Books, 1975)
- Turning Thirty Poem (Nail Press, 1974)
- Firebook (Nail Press, 1974)
- A Partial Exploration of Palo Flechado Canyon (Nail Press, 1973)
- Emptylots: Poems of Venice and L.A. (Nail Press, 1971)
- Field Notes from Alaska (Nail Press, 1971)
- One Week of Mornings at Dry Creek (Christopher Books, 1971)
- Desde Alla (Christopher's Press, 1971)

=== Haiku and haibun ===
- The Way to Thorong La (Empty Bowl, 2020)
- Into the Dream Maze (The Palace Press, 2015)
- At It Again (Tooth of Time, 2015)
- Seeding the Cosmos (La Alameda, 2010)
- Blue Sky Ringing (Punjabi Haiku Forum, 2010)
- Cloud Pavilion (Bancroft Library Press, 2013)
- Staff in Hand, Wind in Pines (Tangram, 2008)
- Water Shining Beyond the Fields (Tres Chicas Books, 2006)
- One Cup and Another (Tangram, 2004)
- Empty Moon / Bellyfull: Haiku from India and Nepal. Pilgrims (India) 2001.
- No Other Business Here: a Haiku Correspondence (with Steve Sanfield; La Alameda, 1999)
- Weeding the Cosmos (La Alameda, 1994)
- That Crow That Visited Was Flying Backwards (Tooth of Time, 1982)

=== Stories ===
- Reflections in the Lizard's Eye: Notes from the High Desert (Western Edge, 2000)
- A Question of Journey (Asia Edition: Book Faith, India, 1999)
- A Question of Journey (Light & Dust, 1995)
- Diary from a Journey to the Middle of the World (The Figures, 1980)
- Desde Alla (Tree/Christopher's, 1971)

=== Edited ===
- The Unswept Path: Contemporary American Haiku (with Dennis Maloney; White Pine, 2005)
- Chimborazo: Life on the Haciendas of Ecuador (Akwesasne Notes, 1976)
- Dog Blue Day: Writing from the Penitentiary of New Mexico (Tooth of Time, 1985)

=== Translations ===
- An Eye Through the Wall: Mexican Poetry 1970-1985 (Tooth of Time, 1986)
- A House By Itself: Selected Haiku, Masaoka Shiki (White Pine, 2017)

== Poetry Awards ==
- Portland State University Poetry Prize, (1972)
- National Endowment for the Arts Poetry Fellowship, (1980)
- NEA Grants as Editor of Tooth of Time Books, (1980–86)
- State Arts Councils Poetry-in-the-Schools Awards: Alaska, Arkansas, New Mexico, Montana, Nevada (1973–1993)
- Witter Bynner Foundation Translation Grants - Mexican Poetry (1985), Japanese Poetry (2016)
- Just Buffalo Literary Center Writer-in-Residence Award (1988)
- Just Buffalo / White Pine Press World of Voices residency award (2004)
- The Haiku Foundation Touchstone Distinguished Books Award (2017)
