= The Woman on Trial =

1927 film

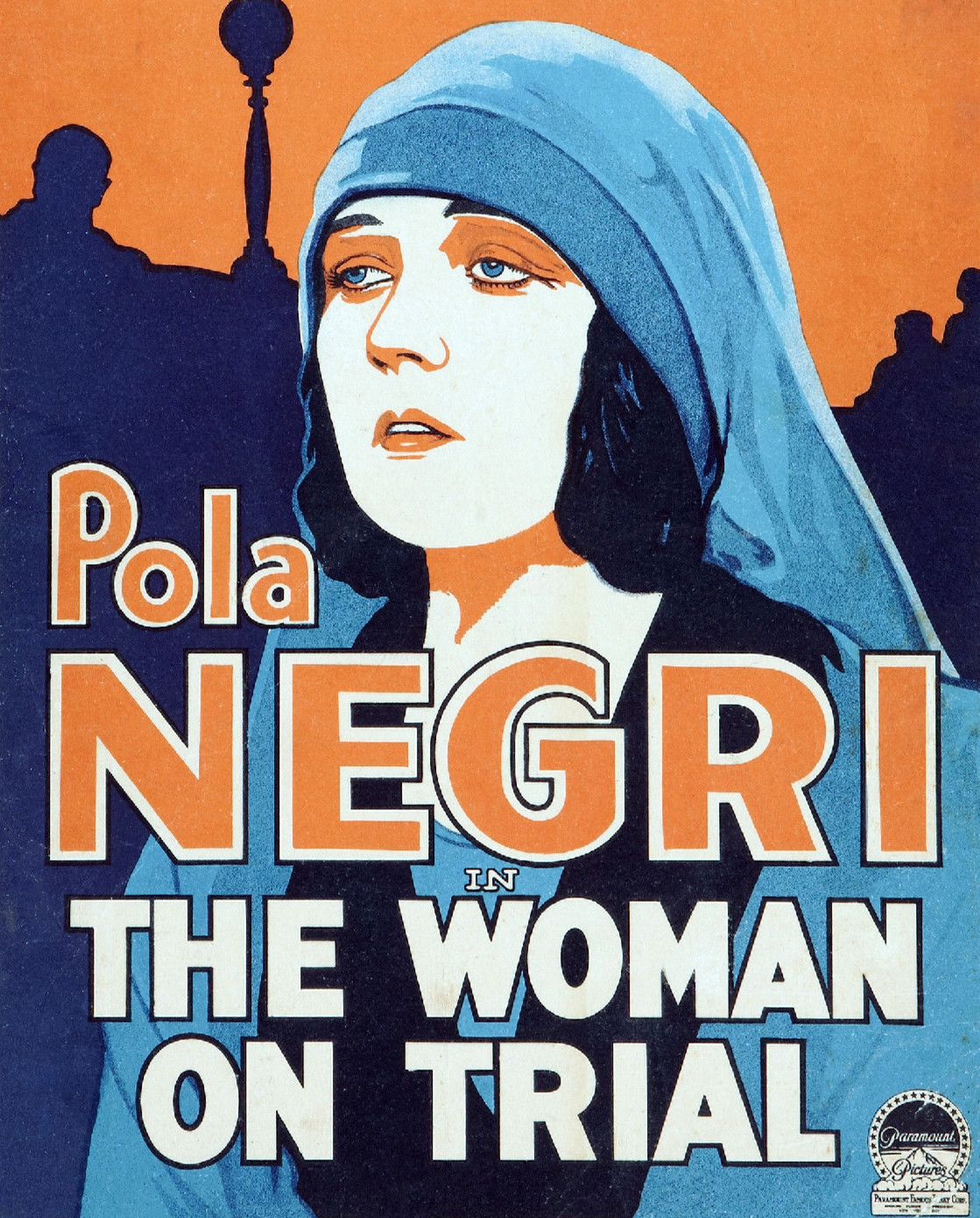
- Film poster or trade advert.
- Directed by: Mauritz Stiller
- Written by: Elsie Fuller; Julian Johnson (titles); Hope Loring (adaptation)
- Based on: Confession by Ernest Vajda
- Produced by: Adolph Zukor; Jesse L. Lasky; B. P. Schulberg
- Starring: Pola Negri
- Cinematography: Bert Glennon
- Distributed by: Paramount Pictures
- Release date: October 29, 1927
- Running time: 60 minutes
- Country: United States
- Language: Silent (English intertitles)

The Woman on Trial is a 1927 American silent drama film directed by Mauritz Stiller, starring Pola Negri, and based on the play Confession by Erno Wajda (aka Ernest Vajda). Adolph Zukor, Jesse L. Lasky, and B. P. Schulberg produced for Paramount Pictures. Ricardo Cortez was originally cast in Hanson's part until he was replaced.

== Cast ==
- Pola Negri as Julie
- Einar Hanson as Pierre Bouton
- Arnold Kent as Gaston Napier
- Andre Sarti as John Morland
- Baby Dorothy Brock as Paul
- Valentina Zimina as Henrietta
- Sidney Bracey as Brideaux
- Bertram Marburgh as Morland's Lawyer
- Gayne Whitman as Julie's Lawyer

== Preservation ==
Fragments of The Woman on Trial survive at the Museum of Modern Art. A reel of outtakes are held at George Eastman House.
