= The Woman of Knockaloe =

1923 novel by Hall Caine

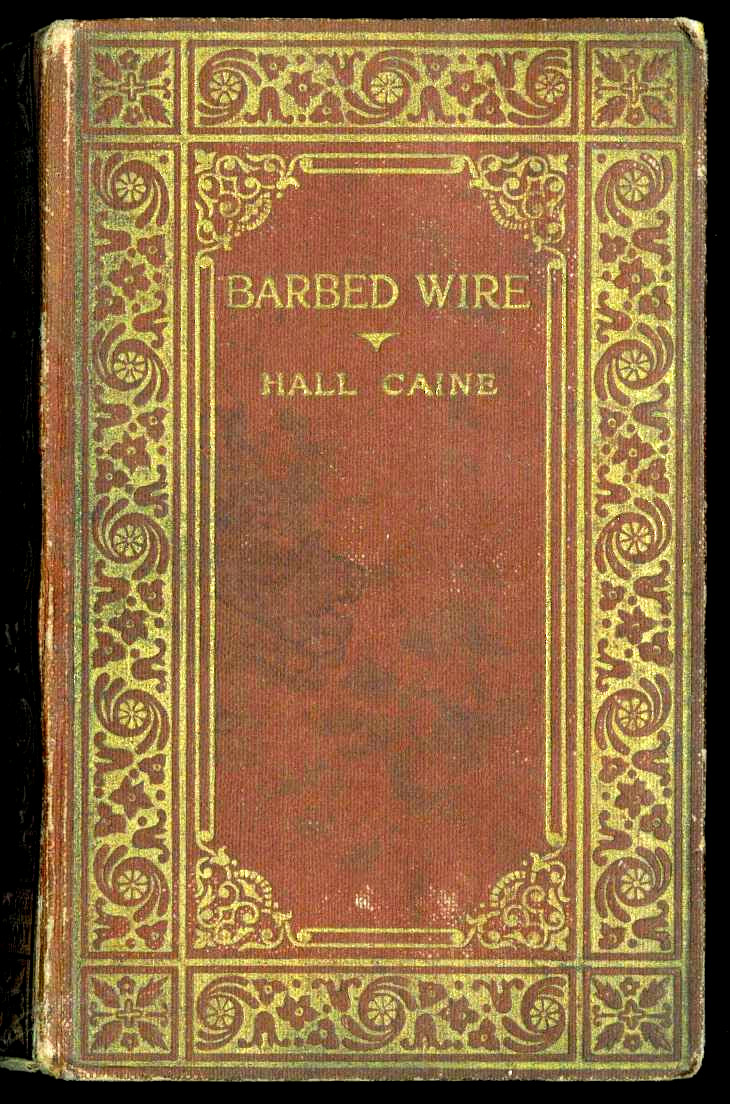
- The 1927 Readers Library edition of 'Barbed Wire' (renamed from ‘The Woman of Knockaloe’)
- Author: Hall Caine
- Language: English
- Set in: Isle of Man
- Published: 1923 by Cassell and Company Ltd.
- Publication place: United Kingdom
- Media type: Print (hardcover)
- Pages: 247 pp (Readers Library edition)
- OCLC: 474708677

The Woman of Knockaloe: A Parable is a melodramatic novel by Hall Caine first published in 1923. Set on the Isle of Man during the First World War, a young woman finds herself drawn to one of the nearby German internees. They begin a romance in the face of the fierce hostility of the local community which eventually drives them to commit suicide. The story has been described as a "minor masterpiece".

== Background ==
Hall Caine was 61 when World War I broke out in 1914. Vehemently in favour of the conflict, he put aside fiction writing to dedicate himself to writing in support of the war effort. His work included articles for the English, American and Italian press, as well as King Albert's Book and The Drama of 365 Days: Scenes in the Great War. However, as the war came to an end, Caine grew disillusioned by both the conflict and the peace that came of the Treaty of Versailles. The Woman of Knockaloe was a result of Caine's sense of responsibility for his earlier encouragement of the war, as he wrote to George Bernard Shaw with an advanced copy of the book:

Rightly or wrongly I did my best for the war, and now, as you see, I am trying… to do my best for the peace.

In December 1922 Caine had a dream which included the central parts of the narrative for the novel, concerning the Knockaloe internment camp that had existed for five years during the war not far from Caine's home at Greeba Castle. He wrote the novel based on the dream in the months that followed. However, he did not plan to publish it, claiming that he had written it "solely for the relief of his own feelings at the thought of the present lamentable condition of the world." However, Newman Flower, a partner of Cassell and Co., came across the manuscript when visiting Caine's home in the spring of 1923 and convinced Caine that it should be published.

== Plot ==
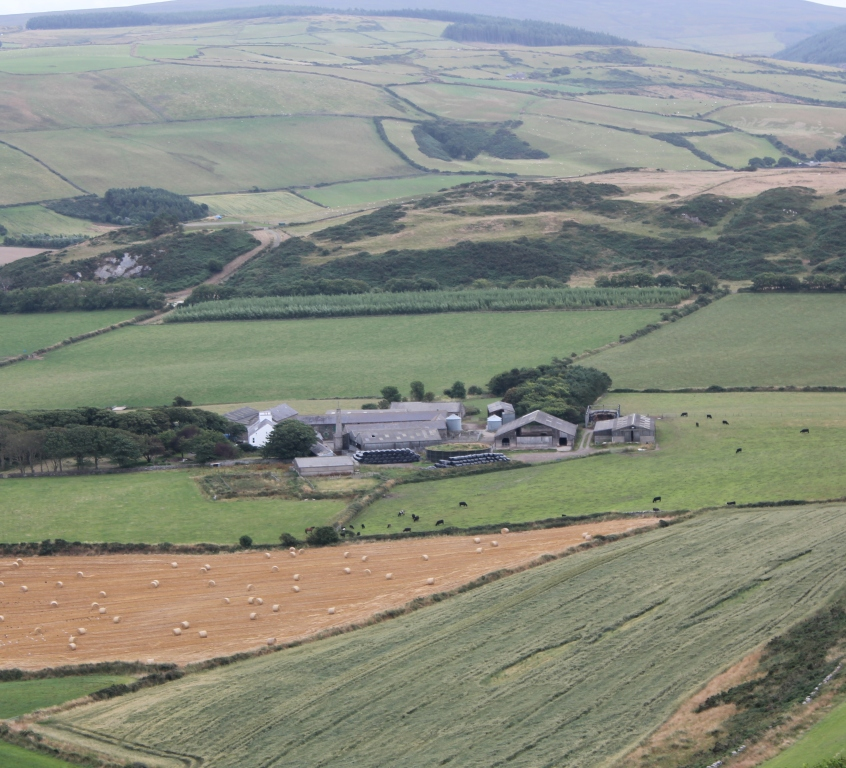
Knockaloe Farm, near Peel, Isle of Man

Mona Caine and her brother react with nationalist pride when World War I is announced. In contrast, their father, Robert Caine, a tenant farmer at Knockaloe Farm, is concerned and dismayed at the bad that he fears will come of it.

Mona and her father's lives are disrupted first by her brother being called up to fight in France, and then by the authorities agreeing with the owner of the farm to set up an internment camp for enemy aliens there at Knockaloe. Mona consents to live there still and supply food for "those Germans whose brothers are killing our boys in France", greatly against her wish and only for the sake of her ageing father.

The erection of the camp's huts, concrete and wire on their fields only hardens her heart against the Germans. This is further entrenched when the internees begin to arrive, first the aloof privileged rich, followed by the rowdy sailors etc. When news of her brother's death at the front arrives, her father has a seizure and becomes bed-bound. Mona's hatred of the German's now reaches a new pitch:

She hears of frequent rioting, rigorously put down, and then of an attempt at insurrection in the messroom of the First Compound, and of four prisoners being shot down by the guard. Serve them right! She has no pity.

However, her hard and unforgiving attitude towards the Germans begins to lessen when she meets the polite and well-spoken Oskar Heine. As she begins to fall in love with him, her virulent hatred of the Germans begins to break down as she increasingly comes to empathise with their plight and understand their common humanity. In contrast, her father has grown almost deranged in his spiritually-infused railing at the German "sons of hell". This comes to a head on Christmas Eve 1917 when Oskar receives news that his young sister has been killed by an allied bomb as she slept in her home in Mannheim. After he confides in Mona they embrace, only to be caught by her father who has pulled himself from his bed. Outraged, Mona's father rails at her as a “Harlot! Strumpet!” before passing out with a seizure from which he dies some days later.

The local community come to know of the relationship between Mona and Oskar, and the couple then face increasing hostility. As the war draws to a close, their hope of a future together is dashed in stages: the landlord of the farm refuses to extend the lease to Mona; Oskar is required to return to Germany despite having lived in Liverpool prior to the war; Oskar's mother refuses to accept Mona into her home in Germany; and their passage to America is blocked when Mona fails to raise the required money due to collusion in the auctioning off of the farm's livestock.

Realising that there is no future for them together in a world so divided by war, Mona and Oskar commit suicide together by leaping to their deaths from the cliffs overlooking the sea.

== Publishing and reception ==
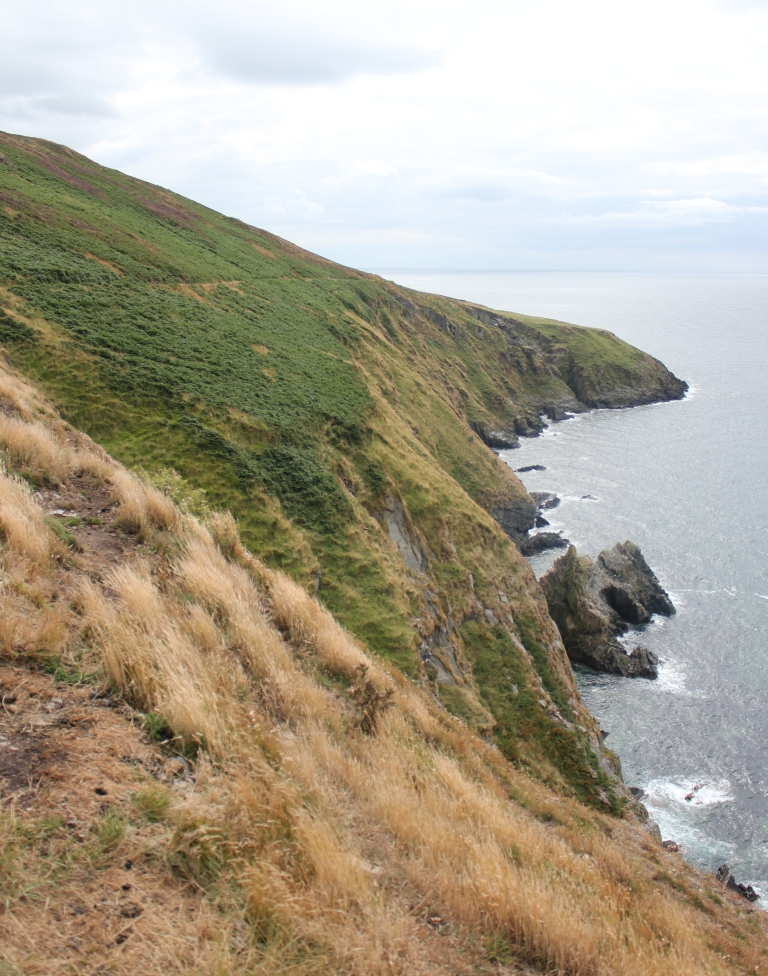
The cliffs from which Mona and Oskar leap

Having followed the plot given to him of a dream in December 1922, Caine only then realised that it contained some "coincides of fact". Being already at that time unpopular on the Isle of Man, he did not want to further displease the local community and so he initially did not plan to publish the novel. However, when his publisher discovered and read the manuscript in the spring of 1923, Caine eventually consented and the book was published in the summer of 1923.

The novel gained considerable popular success, selling over 500,000 copies and being translated into numerous languages. In one of Caine's obituaries in 1931, the book was identified with being "the first of the war stories", coming as it did some years before All Quiet on the Western Front.

The book was well received in some circles, where Caine was seen as a writer of unquestionable global importance. Such a view of Caine was shown in the blurb on the dust jacket which unflinchingly compared Barbed Wire with William Shakespeare's Romeo and Juliet and Émile Zola's The Attack on the Mill. George Bernard Shaw wrote of his enjoying the novel:

It was not until 5.10 yesterday that my wife put Barbed Wire (The Woman of Knockaloe) into my hands. She was astonished when, at 7 sharp, I shut it and said “Finished!” It is a great public service. Literature has spoken.

However, the book was not very well received by the majority of critics. Typical was one that questioned Caine's by-this-time old fashioned narrative style, calling it "a strain upon the reader's credulity". This review concluded with the dismissive observation of the book that: "we are inclined to take the author’s own statement, that it was all a bad dream which he had one night and wrote out in the morning".

The novel was poorly received by the public on the Isle of Man. Despite Cassell having included a disclaimer that "nothing in the book is intended to refer to real-life persons in the Isle of Man or elsewhere", a "storm of abuse" was heaped on Caine for "daring to suggest, even in fiction, that a Manx girl could have fallen in love with a German prisoner of war".

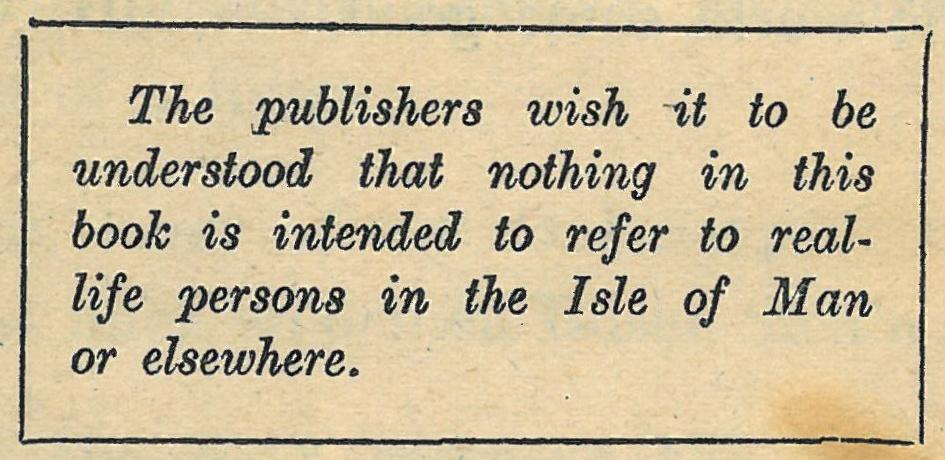
The book's disclaimer seeking to ease the reception on the Isle of Man

Upon a film adaptation being released in 1927, the novel was re-published by The Readers Library Publishing Company Ltd. (London) under the title, Barbed Wire, to coincide with the film. Caine wrote a foreword for this edition, writing that:

I have thought that its publication through the wide-reading medium of the Readers Library, at a critical moment in the life of the League of Nations, might touch the heart of the public and perhaps do the world some good.

This 1927 edition of Barbed Wire was one of the cheapest Hall Caine novels ever published, costing a sixpence at the time. It also had an attractive dust jacket (uncommon for such cheap hardback books) which was reminiscent of the film. Although mass-produced, few copies with a dust jacket in good condition have survived, which has made it a collector's item on both sides of the Atlantic.

Today this novel is largely forgotten, as are the rest of his works, despite being highly regarded best-sellers at the time. His modern biographer has observed that this novel was "a coda to Caine's oeuvre. It is quite different to the novels that went before and is also shorter", being written, as it was, in a state of disillusionment at the direction that the world was taking. It proved to be his last book published during his lifetime.

== Adaptations ==
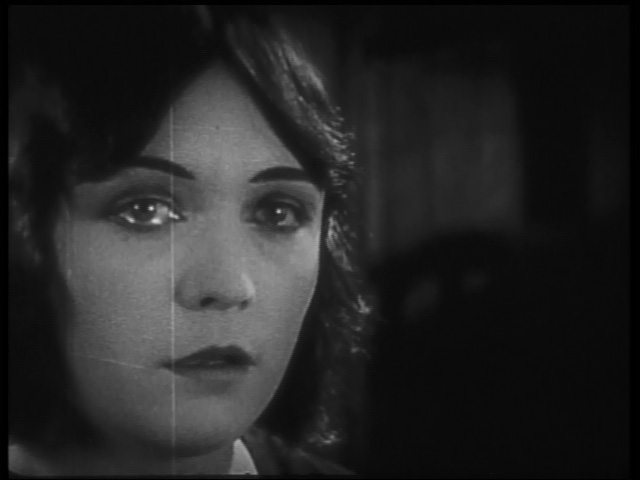
Pola Negri in Barbed Wire

The book was the basis for the 1927 American film Barbed Wire directed by Rowland V. Lee and starring Pola Negri and Clive Brook. The novel's Manx setting was changed to Normandy, France, and some plot alterations were made including the insertion of a happy ending.

Despite the central message of the book, the British audience reacted with an upsurge of anti-German sentiment. Incensed by this, Caine wrote to The Sunday Times objecting to the "monstrous" and "malicious" misrepresentation by "certain sections of the press", which described the plot as "pro-German".

== Quotations ==
- "if you and I had met in the trenches I suppose you would have tried to kill me for the sake of Motherland, and I should have tried to kill you for the sake of Fatherland, yet here you are trying to save me for the sake of ... Brotherland."
- "People thought when the peace came they could go to sleep and forget. What fools! Think of it! Miserable old men spouting about a table, gambling in the fate of the young and the unborn; forgetting their loss in precious human lives, but wrangling about their reparations, about land, about money, which the little mother rocking her baby's cradle will have to pay the interest of in blood and tears some day; setting nation against nation; brewing a cauldron of hate which is hardening the hearts and poisoning the souls of men and women all the world over."

== Trivia ==
- Knockaloe Detention Camp opened on 17 November 1914 and was in operation until 1919, holding up to 26,000 internees, of German, Austrian, Turkish and Serbian nationality.
- The shooting of four internees by camp guards mentioned in Chapter Three in fact took place at the other internment camp on the Island, in the former Cunningham's Holiday Camp in Douglas, where six internees were shot dead.
- That Oskar ties Mona to him with his belt before they leap from the cliffs at the conclusion of the novel is reminiscent of The Deemster, where Dan ties Ewan to himself before they commence the knife fight ending in Ewan falling to his death from the cliffs.

== Bibliography ==
- Allen, Vivien (1997), Hall Caine: Portrait of a Victorian Romancer, Sheffield: Sheffield Academic Press, ISBN 1-85075-809-3
- Caine, Hall (1923), The Woman of Knockaloe, London: Cassell and Company Ltd.
- Caine, Hall (1927), Barbed Wire, London: The Reader's Library
- Hardt, Ursula (1997), From Caligari to California: Erich Pommer's Life in the International Film Wars, Berghahn Books
- Kelly, Andrew (1997), Cinema and the Great War, Routledge, ISBN 978-0-203-99216-6, OCLC 437154963
- Norris, Samuel (1947), Two Men of Manxland, Douglas, Isle of Man: The Norris Modern Press
