= Sir Arne's Treasure (1954 film) =

1954 film

- Directed by: Gustaf Molander
- Starring: Ulla Jacobsson
- Release date: 16 December 1954
- Running time: 88 minutes
- Country: Sweden
- Language: Swedish

Sir Arne's Treasure (Swedish: Herr Arnes penningar) is a 1954 Swedish drama film directed by Gustaf Molander. It is based on the novel The Treasure, by Selma Lagerlöf, the first woman to win the Nobel Prize in Literature. The 1919 film Sir Arne's Treasure preceded it. The 1954 film received positive reviews for its color cinematography.

== Cast ==
- Ulla Jacobsson as Elsalill
- Ulf Palme as Sir Archie
- Carl-Hugo Calander as Sir Filip
- Bengt Eklund as Sir Reginald
- Hugo Björne as Herr Arne
- Tekla Sjöblom as Herr Arne's Wife
- Bibi Andersson as Berghild
- Anders Henrikson as Torarin
- Aurore Palmgren as Mor Kajsa
- Ingemar Pallin as Priest
- Gunnar Sjöberg as King Johan III
- Claes Thelander as Charles de Mornay
- Hans Strååt as Captain
