= The Tale of a Manor =

1899 novel by Selma Lagerlöf

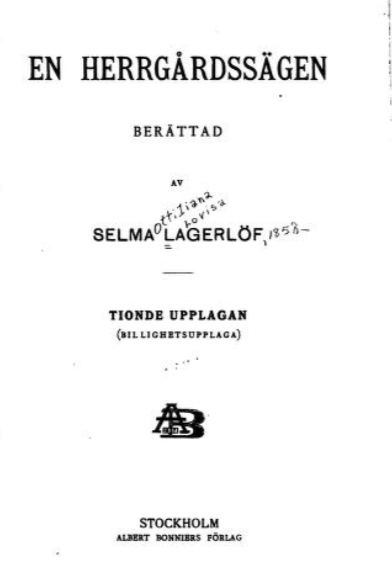
- Title page for En herrgårdssägen (1913 edition)
- Author: Selma Lagerlöf
- Original title: En herrgårdssägen
- Translator: C. Field
- Language: Swedish
- Publisher: Bonniers
- Publication date: 1899
- Publication place: Sweden
- English publication date: 1923
- Pages: 197

The Tale of a Manor (Swedish: En herrgårdssägen) is an 1899 novel by the Swedish writer Selma Lagerlöf. It tells the story of a young woman who tries to help the man she loves recover from mental illness, caused by shame and sorrow. It was published in English in 1923, in a portmanteau volume titled The Tale of a Manor and Other Sketches. The 1923 film The Blizzard by Mauritz Stiller is loosely based on the novel.

== See also ==
- 1899 in literature
- Neo-romanticism
- Swedish literature
