= Einar Hanson =

Swedish actor (1899–1927)

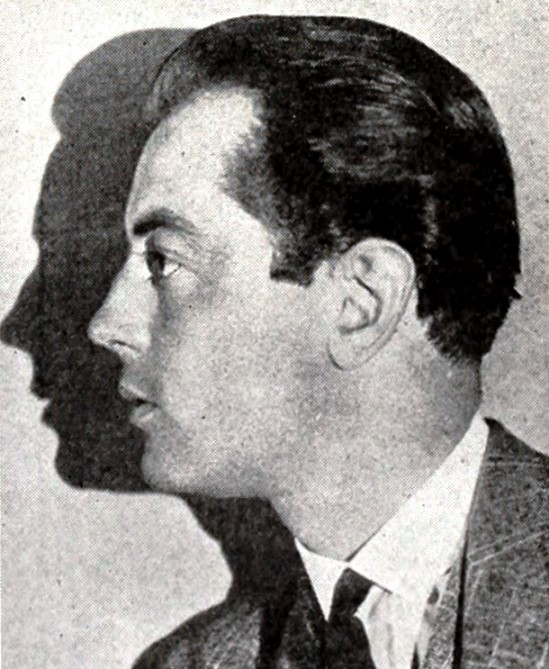
Hanson from a 1925 magazine

Einar Hanson (June 15, 1899; Stockholm, Sweden – June 3, 1927 (aged 27); Santa Monica, California), also known as Einar Hansen, was a Swedish silent film actor.

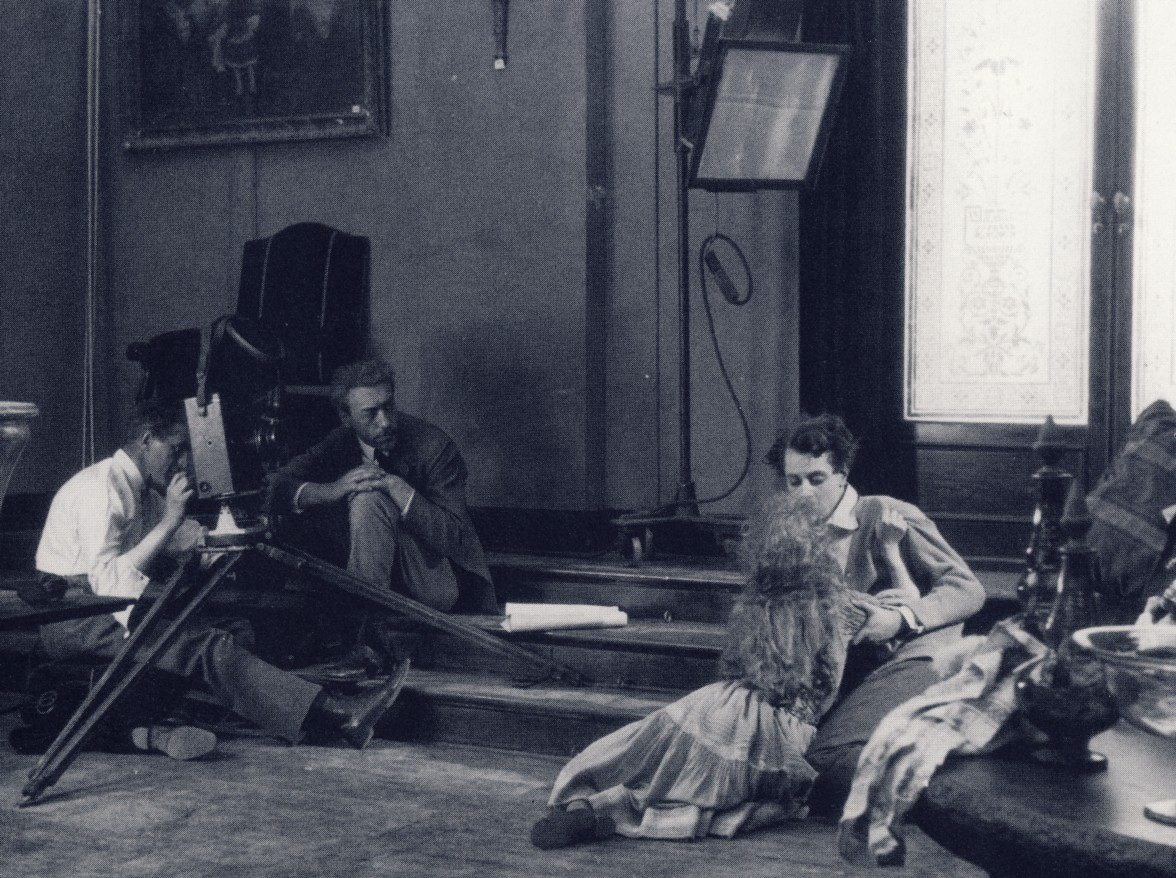
Cinematographer Julius Jaenzon, director Mauritz Stiller, Mary Johnson, and Einar Hanson during the production of The Blizzard (1923)

== Career ==
Discovered at Stockholm's Royal Dramatic Theatre by director Mauritz Stiller, handsome and sophisticated, he was in 1927 ideally positioned to take over from the late Rudolph Valentino as Hollywood's "great screen lover".

Upon his arrival in Hollywood in 1925, along with Stiller and the director's other protégée Greta Garbo, Hanson starred opposite some of the era's leading ladies, including Pola Negri and Corinne Griffith.

Hanson was destined for even bigger and better things at Paramount Pictures, who had bought his original five-year contract from Universal Studios. He showed great progress opposite Clara Bow and Esther Ralston in Children of Divorce, as well as The Woman on Trial and Barbed Wire both with Pola Negri, and Fashions for Women (all 1927), directed by Dorothy Arzner.

== Death ==
On June 3, 1927, Hanson was on his way home from having dinner with Stiller and Garbo when his car apparently skidded off the road on the Pacific Coast Highway near Topanga Canyon. He died on the way to the hospital. Barry Paris, in his 1994 biography Garbo, says that Hanson met Garbo and Stiller at a party where Hanson became intoxicated and he drove off on his own, leading to the fatal accident.

== Filmography ==
- Hemsöborna (1919)
- Mälarpirater (1923)
- The Blizzard (1923) based on the Selma Lagerlöf novel Gunnar Hedes saga
- Johan Ulfstjerna (1923)
- 33.333 (1924)
- Life in the Country (1924)
- Fra Piazza del Popolo (1925)
- Rags and Silk (1925)
- 40 Skipper Street (1925)
- Takt, tone og tosser (1925)
- The Joyless Street (1925) directed by G. W. Pabst
- Into Her Kingdom (1926)
- Her Big Night (1926)
- The Lady in Ermine (1927)
- The Masked Woman (1927)
- Fashions for Women (1927)
- Children of Divorce (1927)
- Barbed Wire (1927)
- The Woman on Trial (1927)
