= Alva Lundin =

Swedish title card and credit designer (1889–1972)

- Born: Alva Lindbohm; May 11, 1889
- Died: February 1972

Alva Lundin (née Lindbohm; May 11, 1889 – February 1972) was a Swedish title card and credit designer and artist. Lundin began writing title cards when title cards first came to Sweden in 1919, several years after using title cards became common practice in the Hollywood film industry. Lundin has been regarded as a leader in the writing of title cards.

== Early life and education ==
Born in Kvillinge, Östergötland in 1889, Lundin moved to Stockholm after the death of her father. From 1904 to 1906, Lundin attended the female section of Tekniska Skolan, later renamed the University College of Arts, Crafts, and Design, where she studied a variety of drawing and design techniques. This was during a time when attending art school as a woman in Sweden was an accepted but uncommon occurrence. Following her studies, Lundin worked as an illustrator and calligrapher at AB Hasse W. Tullberg. It is likely here that she would have met Sven Lundin, whom she married in 1915. After their marriage, the couple started their own business called Lundins Ritbyrå (Lundin's Drawing Company). Sven worked as the administrator while Alva worked as the artist.

== Career ==
The transition to the use of title cards has been regarded as what ultimately elevated films from the status of primitivity, contributing what Katherine Nagels called "key visuotextual elements". Lundin's career as a title card writer (1919–1960) has been identified as beginning with the film Sir Arne's Treasure (Herr Arnes pengar) in 1919 with Svensk Filmindustri. Her success in that role lead to her continuance with Svensk Filmindustri with increased responsibilities in the making of the 1920 film Erotikon. Lundin's title cards followed the popularly used sequence for title cards of the time, and yet her work has been regarded as prolific, and she herself as the "Nestor of Swedish film calligraphers". The effectiveness of Lundin's title cards have been regarded as contributing significantly to the viewers understanding, while simultaneously enhancing the humour of the film. In 1924, Filmnyheter proclaimed Lundin to be "the only [Swedish] film title specialist", a remarkable title to hold as a woman during a period when her presence in the industry was an anomaly. Women artists in Sweden who were able to support themselves with their art were generally illustrators for children's books.

In 1927 Lundin began signing her cards AL. Over her forty-year career, Lundin was credited as the title designer for 16 films, and contributed to nearly 500 films overall.

Filmography
Year	Title
1919	Herr Arnes pengar : En vinterballad i 5 akter
1920	Erotikon : Komedi i fem akter efter ett främmande uppslag
1923	Mälarpirater : Ett pojkäventyr i 6 akter
1923	Boman på utställningen
1924	Gösta Berlings saga/del II : I auktoriserad bearbetning för filmen
1924	Gösta Berlings saga/del I : I auktoriserad bearbetning för filmen
1925	Damen med kameliorna
1926	Flickan i frack : En sommarlätt filmhistoria
1927	Drottningen av Pellagonien
1928	Parisiskor
1928	Synd
1928	Ådalens poesi
1928	Hans Kungl. Höghet shinglar
1928	Svarte Rudolf
1929	Rågens Rike
1930	Charlotte Löwensköld
