= Steve Sanfield =

American writer

- Born: August 3, 1937
- Died: January 28, 2015 (aged 77)
- Education: University of Massachusetts, Amherst
- Writing career
- Genres: Poetry, children's literature

Steven Sanfield (born August 3, 1937 – January 28, 2015) was an American poet, children's book author, and Freedom Rider. He published over 30 books during his lifetime. The University of California Davis library holds a collection of his writings.

== Biography ==
He earned a BA from the University of Massachusetts, Amherst.

He took part in the Los Angeles to Houston Freedom Ride.

== Bibliography ==
=== Poetry ===
- Wandering (1977)
- The Confounding (1980)
- Chasing the Cranes with Dale Pendell (1986)
- American Zen: by a guy who tried it (1994)
- No Other Business Here: a Haiku Correspondence with John Brandi (1999)
- The Rain Begins Below: Selected Slightly Longer Poems 1961-2005 (2005)
- The Right Place: 77 at 77 (2014)
- Clouds Come and Go (2015)

=== Children's books ===
- Adventures of High John the Conqueror (1988)
- Snow (1995)
- Bit by Bit (1995)
- The Great Turtle Drive (1996), illustrated by Dirk Zimmer
- Just Rewards (1996), illustrated by Emily Lisker
