= Selander Company =

The Selander Company was a famous and renowned theatre company in Sweden from 1889–1928 run by the theatre couple Hjalmar and Concordia Selander.

They were famous for discovering and producing young stage talents, for quality productions on tour and for a "respected repertoire" - and, above all, for good finances that actually made sure their actors got paid (something that was important and not all too certain in theatre companies and troupes of those days).

Many of the young talents that started out in the Selander Company later became famous stage actors in Sweden; Lars Hanson, Gösta Ekman (senior), Victor Sjöström, Olof Winnerstrand, Karin Swanström and Karl Gerhard, amongst others.
