= Helmer Alexandersson =

Swedish composer and violinist

Karl Helmer Alexandersson (16 November 1886 – 24 December 1927), was a Swedish composer and violinist. He was the brother of the actress Karin Alexandersson.

== Biography ==
Alexandersson was born in Stockholm, where he attended the Royal College of Music before studying the violin under Johan Lindberg, counterpoint under Johan Lindegren, and instrumentation under Jean Paul Ertel in Berlin. His musical career had a promising beginning: he received several scholarships, and he was commissioned to write the official march of the Olympic Games in Stockholm 1912. His second symphony, premièred by George Schnéevoigt in 1919, was a success. After writing orchestral music for several Swedish films he devoted more of his time to writing music for silent films, and he played in person, along with, among others, Hilding Rosenberg in the orchestra pit at the Red Mill cinema in Stockholm. He died in poverty in 1927, and the funeral was funded by the city.

== Compositions ==
Film music

- 1919 – Herr Arnes pengar
- 1923 – "Gunnar Hedes saga"
- 1925 – Ingmarsarvet

Arrangement

- 1921 – "Värmlänningarna"

Orchestral Music

- 1910 – Overture in C Minor
- 1919 – Symphony No. 2 in G Minor

== Recordings ==
- Overture, Symphony No. 2, Uppsala Kammarorkester, conducted by Paul Mägi, Sterling 2008.
