= Fun in a Chinese Laundry =

1965 memoir by Josef von Sternberg

Fun In a Chinese Laundry
- First edition
- Author: Josef von Sternberg
- Language: English
- Genre: Autobiography
- Publisher: Macmillan Publishers (1965), Mercury House (1988)
- Publication date: 1965, 1988
- Publication place: United States
- Media type: Print (hardback and paperback)
- Pages: 348 (hdb.), 356 (pbk.)
- ISBN: 0916515370 (1988 pbk.)
- OCLC: 891405552 (1965 first edition, hardback)

Fun in a Chinese Laundry is an autobiography by Austrian-American filmmaker Josef von Sternberg first published in 1965 by Macmillan Publishers. The book was reissued in 1988 by Mercury House with a foreword by Gary Cooper.

Von Sternberg provides details from his childhood in Vienna and youth in America, as well as every stage of his film career. The memoir provides numerous character sketches and critiques of film personnel, especially the actors he worked with, among them Marlene Dietrich.

The eponymous title of the autobiography is a reference to an 1894 Kinetoscope film by American inventor and film pioneer Thomas Edison.

== Background ==
Portions of von Sternberg's autobiography were penned as early as 1960 while he was traveling in Europe. Literary critic Ruairi McCann writes:

"Fun in a Chinese Laundry was published 12 years after Sternberg last embarked on a feature, and despite floating the possibility of working again, in the midst of all the bridges burning, it never came to be, as he passed four years later."

=== Significance of the book’s title ===
Thomas Edison's Fun in a Chinese Laundry (1894)

Fun in a Chinese Laundry is a metaphor for the medium that would dominate von Sternberg's artistic and professional endeavors. The movie appeared when both von Sternberg and the film technology were in their infancy. The title for the autobiography is that of a 1894 Kinetoscope burlesque by Thomas Edison. Released shortly before von Sternberg's birth, he offers no explicit remark as to its significance or its influence on his filmmaking.

The reference to the film in his autobiography follows a sustained reminiscence of the famous amusement park and the childhood in Vienna that von Sternberg recalls idyllically as “paradise.”

Everything was orderly, there was nothing to confuse me, there were no comic strips, no radio, no motion pictures or moronic succession of television images, though unbeknownst to me, one Thomas Edison had already made a film entitled Fun in a Chinese Laundry.

== Reception ==
Kirkus Reviews, in its March 8, 1965 edition described the memoir as “corrosively witty, frank and rather outrageous memoir…His story is one of dirty deals, awesome neglect and a few triumphs. It should become a little classic in its field.”

Author and editor Norman Kaplan in the Fall issue of Science and Society wrote: “That this is so can be corroborated by a reading of Joseph Von Sternberg's new book Fun in a Chinese Laundry—an unabashed and brash boast of a lifetime spent as a purveyor to the most prurient appetites of audiences by a man who prates of his triumph side by side with his expression of contempt for the medium and its audiences.”

== Retrospective assessment ==
“I did not endow Marlene Dietrich with a personality that was not her own; one sees what one wants to see, and I gave nothing that she did not already have. What I did was to dramatize her attributes and make them visible for all to see, though, as there were perhaps too many, I concealed some.” — Josef von Sternberg

Film critic Jean-Paul Chaillet considers Fun in a Chinese Laundry of particular interest for its insights into von Sternberg's long personal and professional relationship with German-American film star Marlene Dietrich. Chaillet argues that von Sternberg, "at times sounding quite pompous and arrogant, rants about Dietrich’s self-serving public acknowledgments of his greatness over the years."

Writer and filmworker Ruairi McCann notes that the autobiography "is rife with the characteristics of von Sternberg's personality and cinema; an unflappability, a searing, sardonic wit and a love for spectacle that comes, part and parcel, with a gift for its creation and dissection" and structurally, the memoir "does not move to the letter of a strict and straight chronology, nor is its language crystalline. Instead, the details of his life and career are often presented allusively, rather than as a procession of stated facts…"

McCann adds that "The book is often very funny...Moments or recurring events that in other biographies would be singled out and analyzed as sources of future pain or strength, he undercuts with a stone dry sense of humor."

== Sources ==
- Chaillet, Jean-Paul. 2020. Filmmakers’ Autobiographies: von Sternberg, “Fun in a Chinese Laundry.” Golden Globes Awards. July 24, 2020. https://goldenglobes.com/articles/filmmakers-autobiographies-von-sternberg-fun-chinese-laundry/ Retrieved 10 February 2024.
- Kaplan, Norman. “Who Speaks” in Science & Society, Fall 1965. https://whospeaks.library.vanderbilt.edu/sites/default/files/ScienceandSociety.review.pdf Retrieved 10 February 2024.
- Kirkus Reviews. 1965. "Fun In a Chinese Laundry". Kirkus Reviews, March 8, 1965. https://www.kirkusreviews.com/book-reviews/a/josef-von-sternberg/fun-in-a-chinese-laundry/ Retrieved 10 February 2024.
- McCann, Ruairi. 2021. “Fun in a Chinese Laundry: Josef von Sternberg, the Filmmaker, the Memoirist and the Legendarium.” Photogénie, February 16, 2021. https://photogenie.be/fun-in-a-chinese-laundry-josef-von-sternberg-the-filmmaker-the-memoirist-and-the-legendarium/ Retrieved 10 February 2024.
- Sternberg, Josef von. 1965. Fun in a Chinese Laundry. Library of Congress no. 891405552 (hdb.)
- Sternberg, Josef von. 1988. Fun in a Chinese Laundry. Mercury House, San Francisco, California. ISBN 0-916515-37-0 (pbk.)
