= Hjalmar Selander =

Swedish actor, stage director and theatre manager

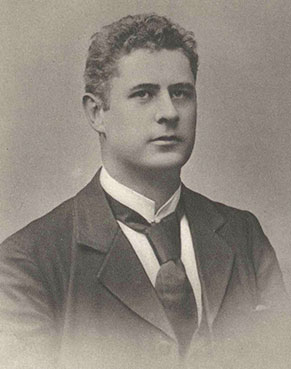
- Born: 2 July 1859; Fässberg parish
- Died: 10 August 1928 (aged 69); Hedvig Eleonora parish
- Resting place: Norra begravningsplatsen
- Occupation: Actor, director, theater manager
- Spouse(s): Concordia Selander

Hjalmar Selander (2 July 1859 – 10 August 1928) was a Swedish actor, stage director and theatre manager.

== Biography ==
Selander was born in Mölndal Municipality in Västra Götaland, Sweden. He made his debut at the Stora teatern in Göteborg during 1878. Selander was active in Gothenburg during 1877–1879, in various travelling theatre companies from 1879 until 1888 and the Swedish Theatre (Stockholm) during 1888–89. In 1890, he started his own theater company. From 1909 until 1925, Selander was head of the Nya teatern at Järntorget, Gothenburg.

He was married in 1887 to actress Concordia Selander, with whom he for many years ran the notable Selander Company. He died in Stockholm and was buried at Norra begravningsplatsen.
