= Concordia Selander =

Swedish actress and theatre manager

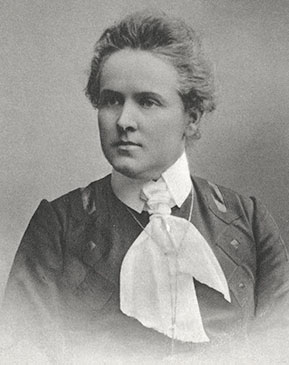
Selander ca. 1890.

Concordia Cornelia Johanna Selander, née Hård (Arboga, 2 June 1861 – 31 March 1935), was a Swedish actress and theatre manager.

Her father was a music instrument maker. She first trained at the school of the Royal Swedish Ballet (1874–80) and later at the Royal Dramatic Training Academy (1878–83). She was active at Stora teatern in Gothenburg 1883–85, at various travelling theatre companies in 1885–88, and at the Swedish Theatre (Stockholm) in 1888–89.

In 1887, she married Hjalmar Selander, and from 1889 she was actor and co-manager of their own Selander Company. From 1917, she also worked as an actress in films.
