= Mauritz Stiller =

Swedish film director (1883–1928)

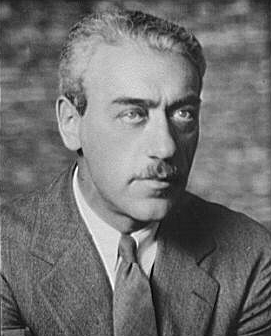
- Stiller in 1927
- Born: Moshe Stiller; 17 July 1883; Helsinki, Grand Duchy of Finland
- Died: 8 November 1928 (aged 45); Stockholm, Sweden
- Citizenship: Sweden
- Occupations: Film director, screenwriter
- Years active: 1912–1928

Mauritz Stiller (born Moshe Stiller, 17 July 1883 – 8 November 1928) was a Swedish-Finnish film director of Jewish origin, best known for discovering Greta Garbo and bringing her to America. Stiller was a pioneer of the Swedish film industry, writing and directing many short films from 1912. When Metro-Goldwyn-Mayer invited him to Hollywood as a director, he arrived with his new discovery Greta Gustafsson, whose screen name Greta Garbo is believed to have been his suggestion. After frequent disagreements with studio executives at MGM and Paramount Pictures, Stiller returned to Sweden, where he died soon afterward.

== Early life ==
Moshe Stiller was born on 17 July 1883 in Helsinki. His family was of Ashkenazi Jewish heritage, having lived in Russia and Poland before settling in Finland, these countries being ruled by the Russian Empire at that time. After his father's death when he was four, his mother committed suicide. He was raised by family friends. From an early age, Stiller was interested in acting. His talents did not go unnoticed, and soon Stiller was offered the opportunity to practise and display his acting skills in the theatres of Helsinki and Turku in Finland.

Drafted into the army of Czar Nicholas II — Finland was at the time the Grand Duchy of Finland, an autonomous state ruled by the Russian Czars — rather than report for duty he fled the country and settled in Sweden. He became a Swedish citizen in 1921.

== Career ==
By 1912, Stiller had become involved with Sweden's rapidly developing silent film industry. He began by writing scripts, acting and directing in short films but within a few years gave up acting to devote his time to writing and directing. He was soon directing feature-length productions, and his 1918 work Thomas Graals bästa barn (Thomas Graal's First Child), starring Karin Molander, and with Victor Sjöström in the leading role, received much acclaim.

By 1920, having directed more than 35 films, including Sir Arne's Treasure and Erotikon, Stiller was a leading figure in Swedish filmmaking. He also directed The Blizzard, starring a young Einar Hanson and based on the Selma Lagerlöf novel En herrgårdssägen (English: The Tale of a Manor).

== Stiller and Garbo ==
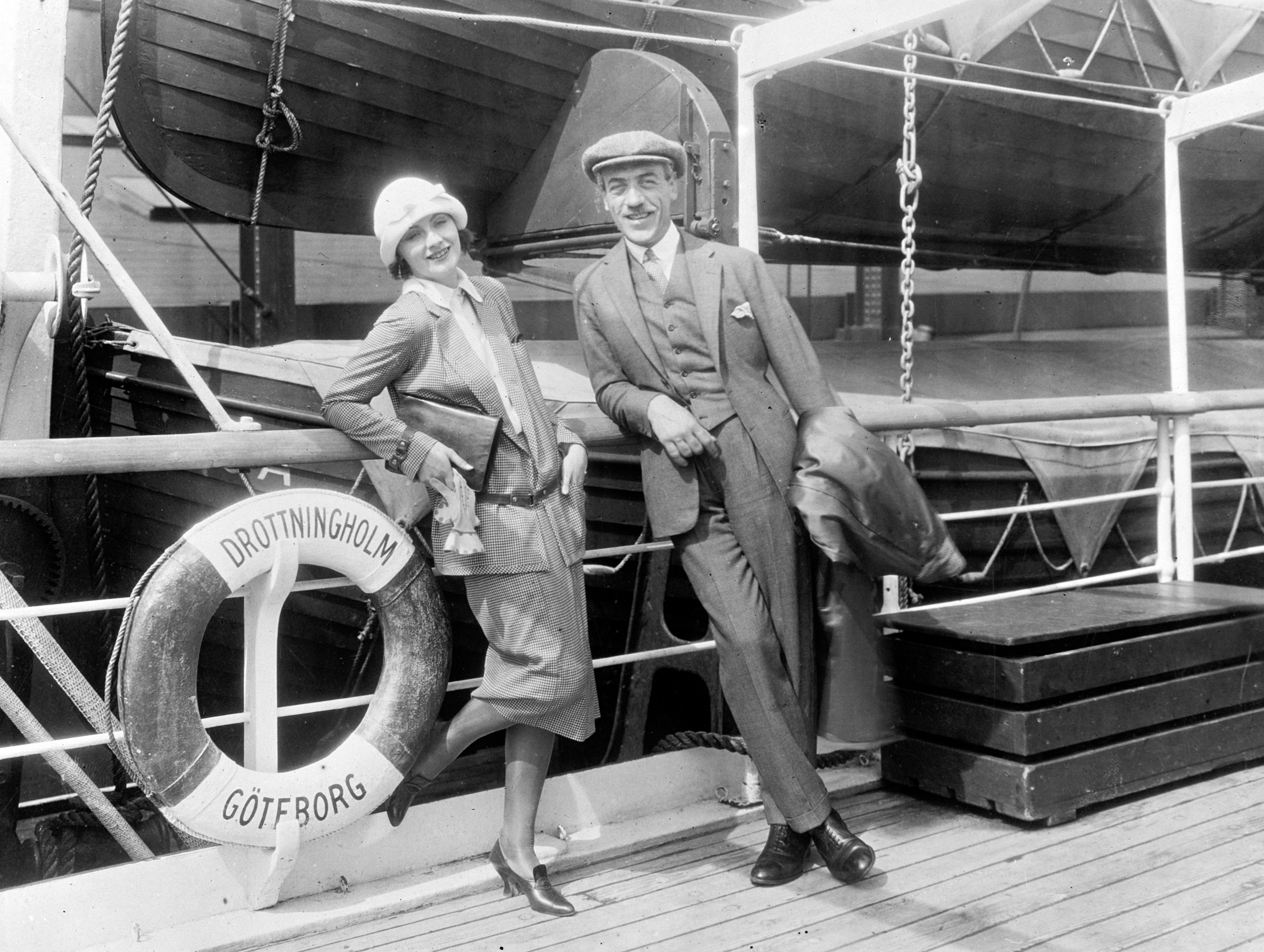
Greta Garbo and Stiller aboard SS Drottningholm in 1925 en route to the United States

At the Royal Dramatic Theatre in Stockholm, he met a young actress named Greta Gustafsson whom he cast in an important but secondary role in his film, Gösta Berlings saga (The Atonement of Gosta Berling), and who some have said gave her the stage name Greta Garbo. For Stiller, the screen presence of the 20-year-old actress led to him bringing her and Hanson to the United States after he accepted an offer from Louis B. Mayer to direct for Metro-Goldwyn-Mayer.

In Hollywood, Stiller was assigned to direct The Temptress (1926), Garbo's second film with MGM, but he could not deal with the studio structure. After repeated arguments with MGM executives, he was replaced on the film by Fred Niblo, and his contract with the studio terminated. Stiller immediately was hired by Paramount Pictures, where he made three successful films, but he was let go a second time while directing his fourth film because of his continuing disagreements with studio bosses.

== Personal life ==
Stiller identified as homosexual. He was, as critic Richard Dyer said, flamboyantly so, and his most public friendships were with other gay men in Stockholm and Berlin.

Being homosexual was an asset in European cultural circles at the time, as it was associated with fine art. Stiller actively cultivated a public image as a gay "cosmopolitan dandy" to enhance the public's perception of his homosexuality. In 1925, he was known in Swedish cinema as "Cinema's Oscar Wilde" (a reference not to his wit or humor, but his sexuality).

Stiller had many relationships with young men. One of the most important was with Nils Asther, whom Stiller cast in the gay-themed film Vingarne. Stiller seduced the then-18-year-old, bisexual Asther while making the film. He was Asther's first lover.

Stiller had no romantic or sexual relationship with Greta Garbo. Yet, the American press persisted in saying that Stiller was Garbo's "first and greatest love", omitting to tell the public about Stiller's homosexuality.

== Death and legacy ==
Stiller returned to Sweden in 1927 and died on 8 November 1928 from pleurisy at the age of 45. He was interred in the Norra begravningsplatsen in Stockholm.

Stiller's contribution to the motion picture industry was recognised in 1960 with a star on the Hollywood Walk of Fame at 1713 Vine Street. Originally his star was listed erroneously as "Maurice Diller" and was not corrected until 1988.

A theatre in Filmhuset, home of the Swedish Film Institute, was named in his honour as "Bio Mauritz".

In Kristianstad, a monument was erected in his honour.

In the Badehotellet episode "Feriebarnet", Kitty tells Frigh that Stiller wrote her a letter and wants to take her to Hollywood. When Frigh admits he doesn't know who he is, Kitty replies that Stiller discovered Garbo and shows him a newspaper clipping of the photo of Garbo and Stiller posing on the deck of the SS Drottningholm.

== Filmography ==
| Year | Film | Credited as | | | |
| Year | Film | Director | Writer | Actor | Role |
|---|---|---|---|---|---|
| 1912 | The Gardener (Trädgårdsmästaren) | | Yes | Yes | Passenger |
| 1912 | Mor och dotter | Yes | Yes | Yes | Raoul de Saligny |
| 1912 | I lifvets vår | | | Yes | von Plæin |
| 1912 | Den tyranniske fästmannen | Yes | Yes | Yes | Elias Pettersson |
| 1912 | De svarta maskerna | Yes | Yes | | |
| 1913 | Vampyren | Yes | Yes | | |
| 1913 | På livets ödesvägar | Yes | | | |
| 1913 | När larmklockan ljuder | Yes | | | |
| 1913 | När kärleken dödar | Yes | Yes | | |
| 1913 | Mannekängen | Yes | Yes | | |
| 1913 | The Conflicts of Life (Livets konflikter) | Yes | | | |
| 1913 | Brother Against Brother (Gränsfolken) | Yes | | | |
| 1913 | En pojke i livets strid | Yes | | | |
| 1913 | Den okända | Yes | Yes | | |
| 1913 | Den moderna suffragetten | Yes | Yes | | |
| 1913 | Barnet | Yes | | | |
| 1914 | Stormfågeln | Yes | | | |
| 1914 | När svärmor regerar | Yes | Yes | Yes | Elias |
| 1914 | Kammarjunkaren | | Yes | | |
| 1914 | För sin kärleks skull | Yes | Yes | | |
| 1914 | Det röda tornet | Yes | Yes | | |
| 1914 | Bröderna | Yes | Yes | | |
| 1915 | När konstnärer älska | Yes | | | |
| 1915 | Minlotsen | Yes | | | |
| 1915 | Mästertjuven | Yes | | | |
| 1915 | Madame de Thèbes | Yes | | | |
| 1915 | Playmates (Lekkamraterna) | Yes | Yes | | |
| 1915 | Hans hustrus förflutna | Yes | | | |
| 1915 | Hans bröllopsnatt | Yes | | | |
| 1915 | Hämnaren | Yes | | | |
| 1915 | Dolken | Yes | | | |
| 1916 | The Wings (Vingarne) | Yes | Yes | Yes | Film director |
| 1916 | Lyckonålen | Yes | | | |
| 1916 | Kärlek och journalistik | Yes | | | |
| 1916 | Kampen om hans hjärta | Yes | | | |
| 1916 | Balettprimadonnan | Yes | | | |
| 1917 | Thomas Graals bästa film | Yes | | | |
| 1917 | Alexander den store | Yes | | | |
| 1918 | Thomas Graals bästa barn | Yes | | | |
| 1919 | Song of the Scarlet Flower (Sången om den eldröda blomman) | Yes | Yes | | |
| 1919 | Sir Arne's Treasure (Herr Arnes pengar) | Yes | Yes | | |
| 1920 | Fiskebyn | Yes | | | |
| 1920 | Erotikon | Yes | | | |
| 1921 | Johan | Yes | Yes | | |
| 1921 | Guarded Lips (De landsflyktige) | Yes | Yes | | |
| 1923 | The Blizzard (Gunnar Hedes saga) | Yes | Yes | | |
| 1924 | The Saga of Gösta Berling (Gösta Berlings saga) | Yes | Yes | | |
| 1926 | The Temptress | Yes | | | replaced by Fred Niblo |
| 1927 | The Woman on Trial | Yes | | | |
| 1927 | Hotel Imperial | Yes | | | |
| 1927 | Barbed Wire | Yes | | | |
| 1928 | Street of Sin | Yes | | | |
