= Mercury House (publishers) =

American independent book publishing company

- Founded: 1986
- Founder: William M. Brinton
- Country of origin: United States
- Distribution: Small Press Distribution
- Publication types: Books
- Official website: www.mercuryhouse.org

Mercury House is an independent trade book publishing company, founded in 1986 by William M. Brinton and established as a 501(c)3 nonprofit (Words Given Wings Literary Arts Project) in 1994.
