= Thekla Hammar =

Swedish translator

Thekla Hammar (1872 - 1953) was a Swedish-French lexicographer and translator. Often working in collaboration with Marthe Metzger, Hammar translated work by the Swedish writers Selma Lagerlöf, Knut Hagberg, Johan Nordström and Eyvind Johnson into French. Hammar and Metzger also collaborated on translations of the Norwegian writer Sigrid Undset and the Danish writer Herman Bang. Hammar, teaching at a lycee in France, stayed in the country after World War I broke out in 1914.

== Works ==
=== Translations ===
- (tr.) Le merveilleux voyage de Nils Holgersson à travers la Suède [Nils Holgersson's wonderful journey across Sweden] by Selma Lagerlöf. Translated from the Swedish Nils Holgerssons underbara resa genom Sverige. Paris: Perrin, 1911.
- (tr. with Marthe Metzger) Carl Linne: Le Roi des fleurs [Carl Linnaeus: The King of Flowers] by Knut Hagberg. Translated from the Swedish. Paris: Ed. Je sers, 1914.
- (tr.) Le charretier de la mort [The carriage of death] by Selma Lagerlöf. Translated from the Swedish Körkarlen. Paris: Perrin et Cie, 1922.
- (tr.) Le Monde des trolls [The world of trolls] by Selma Lagerlöf. Translated from the Swedish Troll och människor. Paris: Perrin, 1924
- (tr.) Les miracles de l'antechrist by Selma Lagerlöf. Translated from the Swedish. Paris, 1924.
- (tr.) Moyen âge et renaissance; essai historique by Johan Nordström. Translated from the Swedish. Paris: Stock, 1933.
- (tr.) Charlotte Löwensköld by Selma Lagerlöf. Translated from the Swedish. Paris: Ed. Je sers, 1935.
- (tr. with Marthe Metzger) Morbacka: (souvenirs) by Selma Lagerlöf. Translated from the Swedish. Paris: Editions Stock, 1937.
- (tr. with Marthe Metzger) La maison de Lilliecrona. Translated from the Swedish. Paris: Editions "Je sers", 1937
- (tr. with Marthe Metzger) La légende de Gösta Berling [The Story of Gösta Berling] by Selma Lagerlöf. Translated from the Swedish Gösta Berlings saga. Stockholm: C. E. Fritze, 1937.
- (tr. with Marthe Metzger) Mon journal d'enfant by Selma Lagerlöf. Translated from the Swedish. Paris: Stock, 1938.
- (tr. with others) Christine Lavransdatter: roman by Sigrid Undset. Translated from the Norwegian. 3 vols. Paris: Delamain et Boutelleau, 1936–8.
- (tr. with Marthe Metzger) L'anneau du pêcheur: nouvelles [The fisherman's ring: tales] by Selma Lagerlöf. Translated from the Swedish. Paris: Stock, 1940.
- (tr. with Marthe Metzger) La femme fidèle : roman by Sigrid Undset. Translated from the Norwegian Den trofaste hustru; roman, 1940
- (tr. with Marthe Metzger) Onze années roman [Eleven years: a novel] by Sigrid Undset. Translated from the Norwegian. Paris: Éd. Stock, Delamain et Boutelleau, 1941.
- (tr.) Maison blanche. Maison grise: récits [White House. Gray House: Stories] by Herman Bang. Translated from the Danish Hvide hus. Det grå hus, Paris: Stock, 1945
- (tr. with Marthe Metzger) Le coeur fou: roman by Selma Lagerlöf. Translated from the Swedish. Paris: Stock, 1958.
- (tr. with Marthe Metzger) Le roman d'Olof [The story of Olof] by Eyvind Johnson. Translated from the Swedish Nu var det 1914. Paris: Stock, 1974.

=== Dictionaries ===
- Svensk-Fransk ordbok [Swedish-French Dictionary]. Stockholm: Norstedt, 1936
