= Tullius (name) =

Tullius is a masculine given name and surname. It may refer to:

== People ==
- Tullius Hammargren (1814–1899), Swedish Lutheran priest, ornithologist and textbook writer
- Tullius Cicero Tupper (1809–1866), American lawyer, newspaper publisher and Confederate major general in the American Civil War
- Bob Tullius (born 1930), American race car driver and racing team owner
- Rexford Tullius (born 1987), American swimmer

== Fictional characters ==
- General Tullius, in the video game The Elder Scrolls V: Skyrim
