= Anna Svärd =

Anna Svärd may refer to:

- Anna Svärd (novel), a 1928 novel by the Swedish writer Selma Lagerlöf
- Anna Le Moine (born 1973), formerly known as Anna Svärd, Swedish curler
