= The Phantom Carriage (1939 film) =

1939 film

- Directed by: Julien Duvivier
- Screenplay by: Julien Duvivier; Alexandre Arnoux
- Based on: Thy Soul Shall Bear Witness! by: Suzette O'Nil; Hubert Daix; 1912 novel; Selma Lagerlöf
- Produced by: Paul Graetz
- Starring: Pierre Fresnay; Marie Bell; Louis Jouvet; Micheline Francey
- Cinematography: Jules Kruger
- Edited by: Jean Feyte
- Music by: Jacques Ibert
- Production company: Transcontinental Films
- Distributed by: Société Anonyme Universal-Film
- Release date: 8 September 1939
- Running time: 93 minutes
- Country: France
- Language: French

The Phantom Carriage or The Phantom Wagon (French: La charrette fantôme) is a 1939 French drama film directed by Julien Duvivier and starring Pierre Fresnay, Marie Bell, Louis Jouvet and Micheline Francey. It is based on the novel Thy Soul Shall Bear Witness! by Selma Lagerlöf, which had previously been adapted into the 1921 Swedish silent film The Phantom Carriage by Victor Sjöström.

It was shot at the Neuilly Studios in Paris. The film's sets were designed by the art director Jacques Krauss. It was due to be screened at the first Cannes Film Festival scheduled for September 1939, but cancelled due to the outbreak of the Second World War.

== Cast ==
- Pierre Fresnay as David Holm
- Marie Bell as Soeur Maria
- Micheline Francey as Soeur Édith
- Louis Jouvet as Georges
- Jean Mercanton a Pierre Holm
- Ariane Borg as Suzanne
- Alexandre Rignault as Le géant
- Robert Le Vigan as Le père Martin
- Pierre Palau as Monsieur Benoît
- René Génin as Le père Éternel
- Marie-Hélène Dasté as La prostituée
- Philippe Richard as Le patron du cabaret
- Georges Mauloy as Le pasteur
- Jean Joffre as Le gardien de la prison
- Marcel Pérès as Un consommateur
- Jean Claudio as Un enfant
- Andrée Méry as La vieille repentie
- Mila Parély as Anna
- Henri Nassiet as Gustave
- Valentine Tessier as La capitaine Anderson

== Bibliography ==
- Goble, Alan. The Complete Index to Literary Sources in Film. Walter de Gruyter, 1999.
