= The Löwensköld Ring =

1925 novel by Selma Lagerlöf

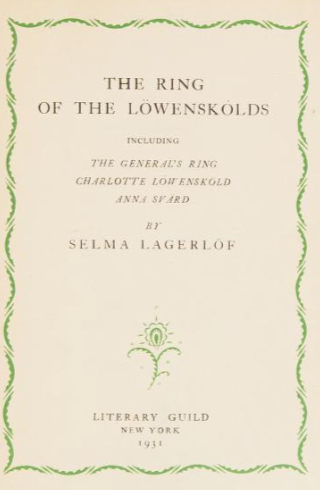
- Author: Selma Lagerlöf
- Original title: Löwensköldska ringen
- Translator: Francesca Martin
- Language: Swedish
- Publisher: Bonniers
- Publication date: 1925
- Publication place: Sweden
- English publication date: 1928
- Pages: 186

The Löwensköld Ring (Swedish: Löwensköldska ringen) is a 1925 novel by the Swedish writer Selma Lagerlöf. It was first translated into English by Francesca Martin as The General's Ring, and thus published by Doubleday, Doran in 1928. It is the first installment in Lagerlöf's Ring trilogy, which Doubleday, Doran named The Ring of the Löwenskölds in a 1931 publication. Thus, it was followed by Charlotte Löwensköld and Anna Svärd.

The ghostly story takes place in the area around Karlstad. The family's name is taken from the Löwenhielm family, but Lagerlöf first called the book and the people Löwenborg, a name that often appeared in the newspapers at the time. Since there were people from the Löwenborg family alive, however, the publisher changed the name to Löwensköld.

== Plot ==
The plot begins with a view of General Bengt Löwensköld at Hedeby. Much focus is on the gold ring he received from Charles the twelfth. The ring was the general's most prized possession, and when he dies he is buried with it. A few months later, the family grave is opened to bury a recently deceased granddaughter of the general, and during the night the farmer Bård Bårdsson and his wife take the opportunity to open the general's coffin and steal the ring. They are then haunted by misfortunes that drive the whole family into poverty and into the wasteland into a shanty town.

On his deathbed Bård confesses to the dean of Hedeby and gives him the ring, but Bård's son Ingilbert hears this and tries to murder the dean on the way home. The dean escapes but loses the ring, and then alarms Hedeby about what happened. The general's son, horsemaster Löwensköld, vengefully gathers a fighting force to hunt down Ingilbert. In the forest, they meet the Ivarsson brothers with their foster son Paul, who is carrying the dead Ingilbert on a stretcher. The three men say that they met Ingilbert and that he tripped in terror and hit himself so badly that he died immediately.

However, the ring is gone and the three men do not want to admit that they have seen it. The horseman's desire for revenge then drives him to have the innocent men arrested and executed.

Thirty years later, Erik Ivarsson's daughter Marit, Paul's fiancée, lives alone and still bitter about the crime the Löwensköldarna committed against her. When she accidentally finds the general's ring sewn into Ingilbert's cap, she sees her chance for revenge. She sews it into the boy Adrian Löwensköld's cap and he then takes the general's curse home with him. Hedeby begins to be haunted by the general's ghost.

A few years later, maiden Malvina Spaak comes to Hedeby to work as house manager. She is terrified of ghosts but soon discovers that the general's spirit seems to be kind to her. She also falls in love with the now grown Adrian, who confides in her that he hopes to free his ancestor and give him peace. But when Adrian meets the general one night, he is so frightened that he falls into a coma. Malvina desperately turns to Marit for help, but is first met with total refusal. However, Marit softens when she realizes that Malvina loves Adrian, and then realizes that she cannot put another young girl through the same pain that she herself went through. Marit makes Malvina find Adrian's old hat and shows her the ring.

At the cemetery, Malvina manages to slide the ring into the burial mound through a hole in the ground, and when she returns to Hedeby, she is greeted by the news that Adrian has woken up. Out of gratitude for her help, he lets her be one of the first to know that he is engaged.

The plot continues in Charlotte Löwensköld and Anna Svärd. In the latter, it is revealed that Marit, enraged that the Löwenskölders once again failed a young, poor woman, pronounced a curse on the entire family - just as Marit lost three of her own, three Löwenskölders will die a violent death.

== See also ==
- 1925 in literature
- Swedish literature
