= Karlskoga Church Rectory =

Historic building in Karlskoga Municipality, Sweden

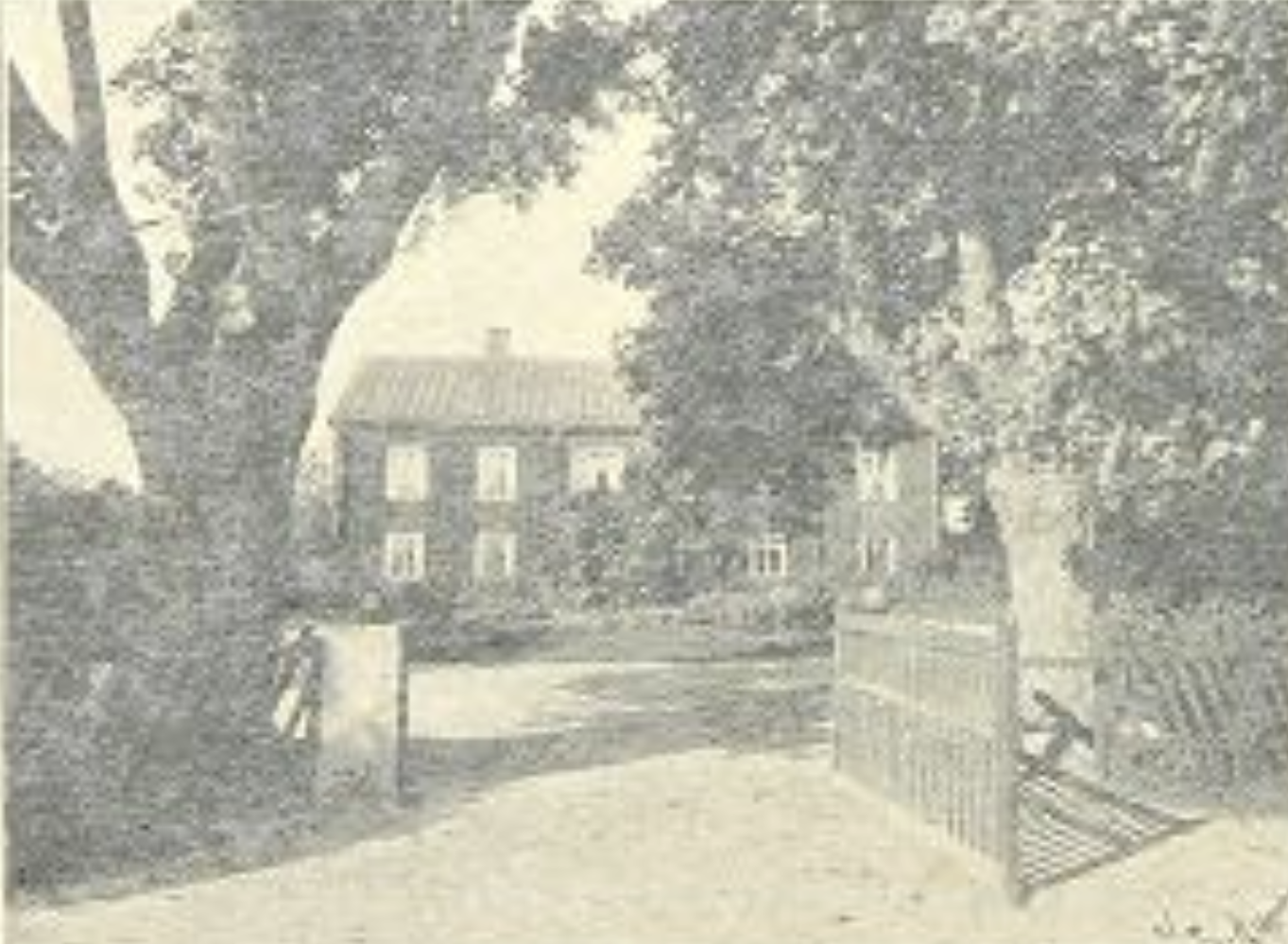
Karlskoga Clergy House in 1895

Karlskoga Church Rectory (Swedish: Karlskoga prostgård) is a historic clergy house in Karlskoga, Sweden.

In 1875, the celebrated Swedish author and Nobel Prize laureate, Selma Lagerlöf aged 16, resided at the clergy house with vicar Erik Tullius Hammargren, alongside his spouse, Ottiliana Lagerlöf, who happened to be her aunt. During that period, Selma Lagerlöf was one of his confirmation students.
