= Mårbacka =

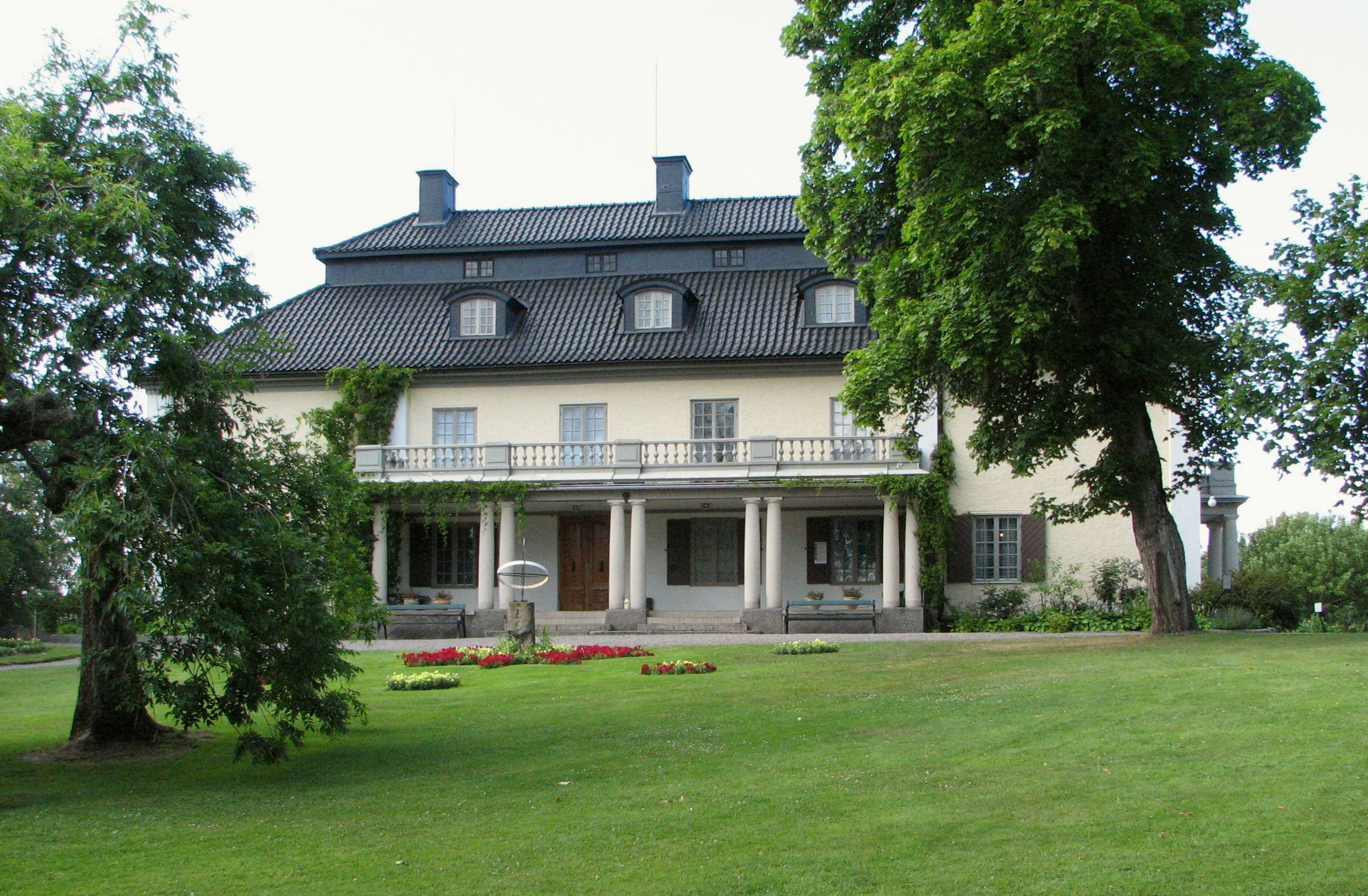
- Interactive map of the Mårbacka area

General information
- Type: Manor house
- Location: Sunne Municipality, Sweden
- Coordinates: 59°46′52″N 13°14′1″E

Design and construction
- Architect: Isak Gustaf Clason

Website
- marbacka.com

Mårbacka is a manor house in Sunne Municipality in Värmland, Sweden. The first woman to win the Nobel Prize in Literature, Selma Lagerlöf, was born and raised at Mårbacka. Today, the manor building and the surrounding area is kept as a memorial museum honoring her literary career.

== Early history ==
The estate was owned from about 1720 by the assistant vicar Olof Morell and then was inherited by two of his successors in office. The main building was constructed in 1793. In 1801 it was inherited by the Lagerlöf family and when Selma Lagerlöf's father Lieutenant Gustaf Lagerlöf died in 1885 his son Johan took over, but he was unsuccessful running the farm. He went bankrupt and moved to America. The family lost the ownership of the estate in 1889.

== Selma Lagerlöf ==
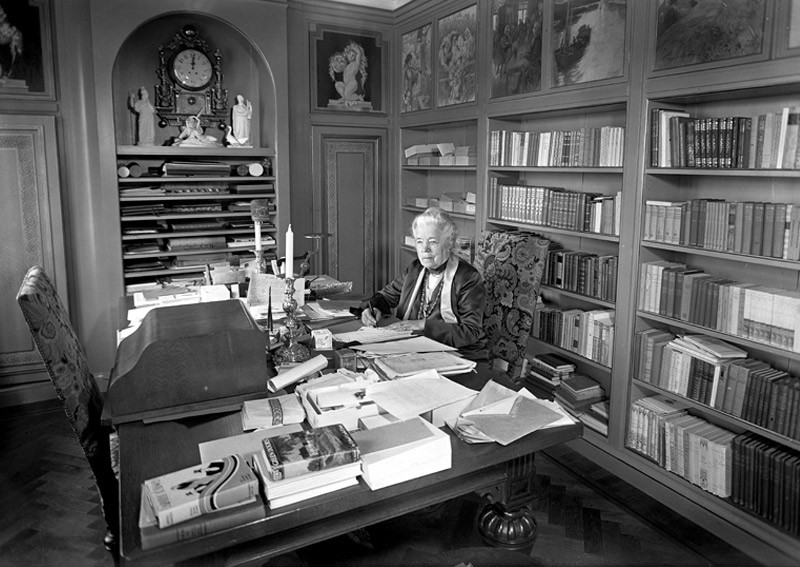
Selma Lagerlöf at Mårbacka in 1933

Selma Lagerlöf acquired main building in 1907 and in 1910, she could buy back the whole estate with the help of the prize money she received from the Nobel Prize in Literature in 1909.

The manor house was rebuilt in 1921–1923 based upon designs by architect Isak Gustaf Clason (1856–1930). She had the building reconstructed; not much of the original appearance of her childhood home remained. Together with the horticulturist Ruth Martina Brandberg (1878–1944), she created the garden comprising a wide variety of bushes, shrubs, fruit trees, vegetable and flower.

The original red-painted cottage was extended eastward, a new floor and an attic were added and the grand facade completed its transformation into an elegant manor.

== Today ==
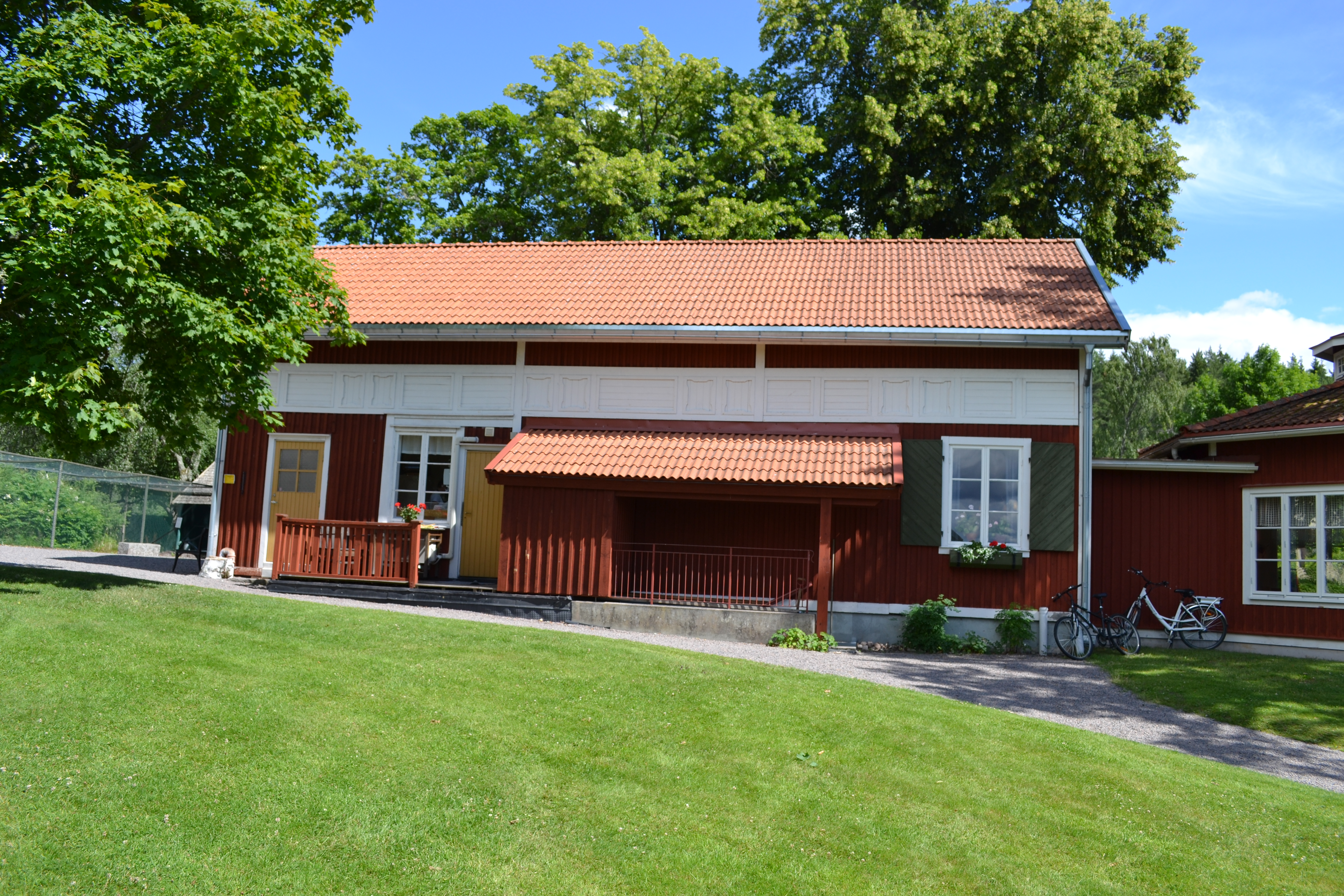
Mårbacka Lada

In her last will and testament Selma Lagerlöf wrote that Mårbacka should be preserved as a memorial estate and be shown to the public. Mårbacka is now kept as a memorial estate, as a result of the author writing in her testament that Mårbacka should be preserved and shown to the public in the condition it was at her death. By paid entrance, visitors can get a guided tour of the main building and next to the building is also a garden, a cafe and a bookstore. At Mårbacka Barn (Mårbackas Lada) there is a memorial exhibition of Lagerlöf's life and writings.
