= Valborg Olander =

Swedish teacher, politician and suffragette

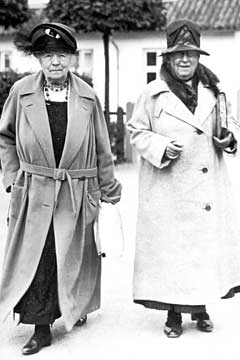
Valborg Olander (right) with Selma Lagerlöf in the 1930s

Valborg Olander (14 May 1861 – 27 February 1943) was a Swedish teacher, politician and suffragette. She is known for her friendship with the author Selma Lagerlöf, the first woman to win the Nobel Prize in Literature.

== Life and career ==
Valborg Olander was born in Uddeholm Manor, Värmland, one of the five children of the medical doctor Gustaf Achilles and Eva Charlotta Munktell. After the death of her father when she was twelve, her mother supported the family by opening a fashion shop in Ulricehamn.

Olander was educated at a girls' school in Jönköping, and at Högre lärarinneseminariet in Stockholm at the age of fifteen in 1876. After graduation in 1879, she worked as a teacher in Lidköping in 1879–80, at the elementary for girls in Gothenburg in 1880–88 and, from 1888 until 1916, at the people's academy in Falun. Olander was a strong supporter of women's suffrage: she was the chairperson of the Falun branch of National Association for Women's Suffrage in 1905–1920 and its representative in its national central committee. She was active as a writer both as a suffragette and as a teacher, and published works about the Swedish language with the linguist and lexicographer Gustaf Cederschiöld.

From 1907 to 1912, Olander was the vice chairman of the committee running the Seminarteacher's society; she was a board member of the Falun public libraries; in 1909–1910 a member of the school council and was appointed by the city council to the board of the Academy for Girls in Falun, which she was in 1912–1918. In 1909, women became eligible to stand for election to municipal councils, and at the 1910 election, Valborg Olander was elected to the Falun city council for the Liberal Party, and alongside Elfrida Larsson, the first female members of the Falun city council. She sat for one term, to 1914.

Valborg Olander was an acquaintance of the author Selma Lagerlöf, with whom she eventually came to develop a love relationship. She is also thought to have affected the work of Selma Lagerlöf in her capacity of literary adviser.

== In popular culture ==
The relationship between Selma Lagerlöf, Valborg Olander and Olander's rival, the writer Sophie Elkan, was portrayed in Selma, a TV series written by Åsa Lantz in 2008, with Helena Bergström as Selma Lagerlöf, Ingela Olsson as Valborg Olander and Alexandra Rapaport as Sophie Elkan.
