= Ingrid Janbell =

Swedish actress, director and lecturer

May Ingrid Janbell is a Swedish actress, director and lecturer.

Janbell was born in Borås, Sweden. She has worked as a professional actress since 1977. Together with Louise Raeder she wrote a play called Matdemonen (The food demon), about anorexia and bulimia, in 1992. Her first film debut was in 1979, in Jackie Söderman's Charlotte Löwensköld. She has had a recurring role as Virena in the Swedish detective film series Hassel.

== Selection of filmography ==
- 2000 – Hassel – Förgörarna (Hassel – the destroyers)
- 1999 – Nya tider (New times; TV)
- 1992 – Hassel – Svarta banken (The black bank; TV)
- 1989 – Hassel – Terrorns finger (The finger of terror; TV)
- 1988 – Träpatronerna (The wooden cartridge; TV)
- 1988 – Nya dagbladet (The new daily paper; TV)
