= Thy Soul Shall Bear Witness! =

1912 novel by Selma Lagerlöf

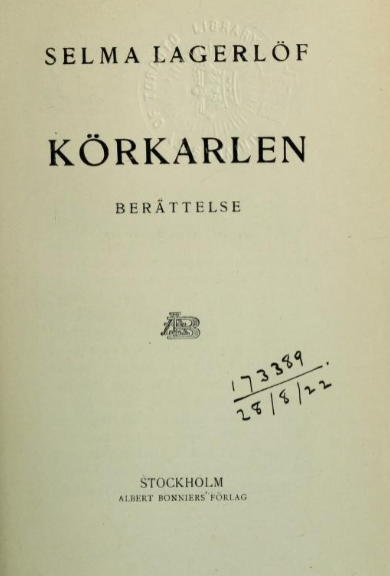
- Title page in original Swedish language Körkarlen (1920 edition)
- Author: Selma Lagerlöf
- Original title: Körkarlen
- Language: Swedish
- Published: 1912
- Publication place: Sweden

Thy Soul Shall Bear Witness! (Swedish: Körkarlen) is a 1912 novel by the Swedish author Selma Lagerlöf. It was translated into English by William Frederick Harvey in 1921. Lagerlöf was commissioned to write it by a Swedish association as a means of public education about tuberculosis ("consumption"). It has been dramatized for the screen twice in Sweden and once in France, under various English titles of The Phantom Carriage, The Phantom Chariot, The Stroke of Midnight, and Thy Soul Shall Bear Witness.

== Plot ==
The novel is set in a small town in Sweden at the beginning of the 20th century. Edith, a young "Slum Sister" (social worker) in the service of the Salvation Army is on her death bed dying of "consumption" (tuberculosis). She requests that before she dies, she would like to again see David Holm, one of her charges. It becomes apparent that the two have a special relationship. A year earlier, he was the first patron of the newly opened social welfare house that Edith had founded. He also had infected her at the time with tuberculosis after she stayed up all night mending his torn and infected coat. Over the next year Edith wanted to help him, but he was a violent alcoholic and always cruelly rejected her. This only increased her resolve and Edith developed a deep love for David. Edith then learned David is married with children, but they had to leave home because David was so violent. Edith persuades David's wife to return home, but they are treated worse than ever by David. This makes Edith feel guilty, as David threatens to deliberately infect his children with TB. On her death bed, Edith now wants to try one last time to put things in order.

Meanwhile, David is sitting in the park with drinking buddies and telling them a horrible story about the coachman of death – as it happens, the last person to die each year is recruited by Death incarnate to travel for the next year picking up the souls of the dead in the Phantom Carriage. David heard this story from his friend George, who died last year on New Year's Eve. After more drinking, David gets into a fight with his companions, is hit in the chest and suffers a hemorrhage (a complication of TB) and falls lifeless to the ground. At the same moment, the clock strikes midnight. David's old friend George then appears in the Phantom Carriage. David now has to replace George and serve for the next year as the driver of Death. When David refuses, George binds him and throws him into the death cart.

Now a ghostly apparition, George takes David to see the people that David loved most and whom he has most harmed. First, they visit the dying Edith. When David learns that Edith loved him, he softens and falls to his knees in front of Edith. Edith can now die in peace, and George commands her soul from her body. David and George then go to a prison in which David's younger brother is incarcerated. The brother had been led astray by David, starting with drinking alcohol and then committing a murder. Now, David's brother is dying of TB. The brother regrets that he has failed to fulfill a promise he once made to a sick child to see the ocean. David vows that he will fulfill his brother's promise, and so David's brother dies in peace. Finally, George and David go to David's wife. She has decided to kill herself and the children, because life with David is no longer tolerable and she sees no way out. David feels love for his children for the first time in his life. David pleads with George to allow his soul to return to his body so that he may stop his wife from killing herself and the children. George agrees to this and to serve another year as driver to the dead. David redeems himself to his wife in a tear-filled reunion. He prays the New Year's prayer that he has learned from George: God, let my soul come to maturity before being harvested.

== Background ==
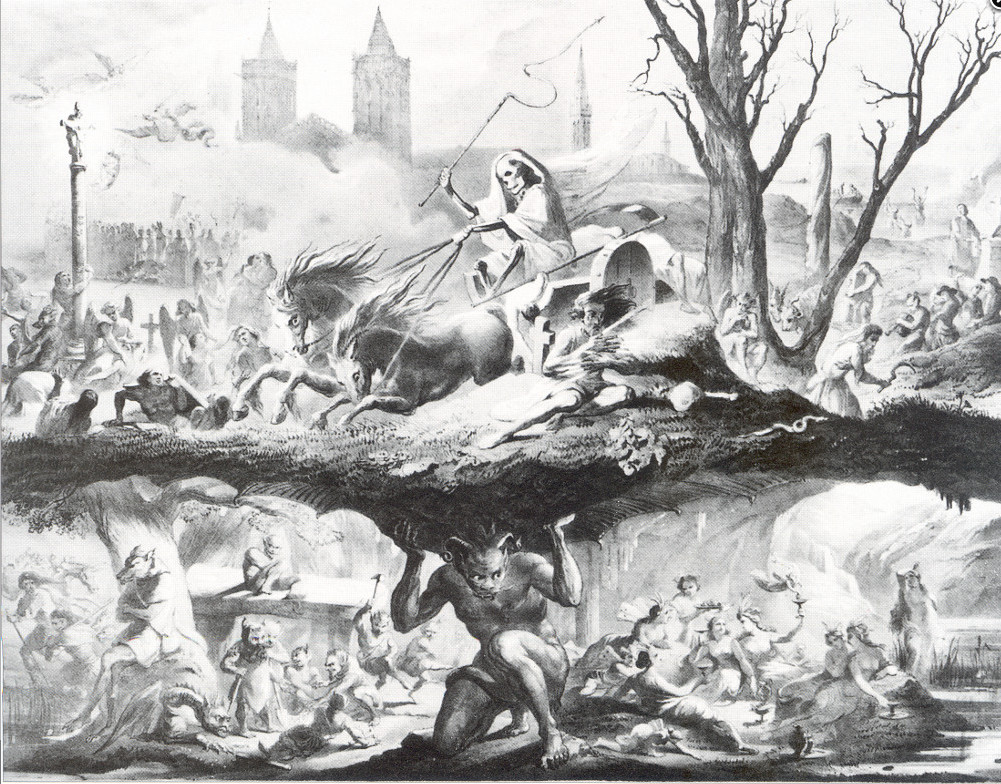
An illustration of Les Merveilles de la nuit de Noël showing the Ankou riding his chariot, 1844. In some European folklore the last dead person of the year in a village becomes the charioteer of death for the next year.

Selma Lagerlöf was commissioned by a Swedish association to write an essay on tuberculosis ("consumption") and its control. Lagerlöf had a personal interest in the disease; her older sister Anna and their young child had it. Before the invention of antibiotics, tuberculosis was widespread and feared, public education was important. Since Lagerlöf could better express herself in a narrative way, rather than a treatise, she proposed to write the novel Körkarlen.

Lagerlöf built into the structure of the novel lessons on how to avoid contracting the disease. She includes scenes of the consequences of coughing in public, hygiene and sterilization of clothing. More so than in her earlier works, she deals with concrete social ills of the day – alcoholism, domestic violence. Her experiences of social deprivation as a young teacher in the southern Swedish town of Landskrona help inform the novel. However far from a novel of social realism, her characters take on mythic qualities, David Holm is a personification of evil.

In contrast to the concrete social ills is the story of a ghostly carriage of death and its rider. In none of the works of Selma Lagerlöf is the role of the supernatural so dominant as in Körkarlen. In a letter to Sophie Elkan, Selma Lagerlöf wrote that in the evening, when she was alone in her room working on the novel, she sometimes had the feeling that only a thin curtain separated her from the other world. This feeling is a basic motif of Körkarlen.

== Screen versions ==
- 1921 – Silent film Körkarlen
- 1939 – La charrette fantôme, a French film directed by Julien Duvivier
- 1958 – Körkarlen
