= Anna Svärd (novel) =

1928 novel by Selma Lagerlöf

Charlotte Löwensköld
- Author: Selma Lagerlöf
- Translator: Velma Swanston Howard
- Language: Swedish
- Publisher: Bonniers
- Publication date: 1928
- Publication place: Sweden
- English publication date: 1931
- Pages: 441

Anna Svärd is a 1928 novel by the Swedish writer Selma Lagerlöf. It is the last installment in Lagerlöf's Ring trilogy, where it follows The Löwensköld Ring and Charlotte Löwensköld.

Anna Svärd was first translated into English by Velma Swanston Howard under the original title, and so published by Doubleday, Doran in 1931 as part of its edition of the trilogy under the title The Ring of the Löwenskölds (LCCN 31-985).

Many lives are interwoven in the book: Karl-Arthur himself, the preacher with his self-defeating ideals of self-denial and sacrifice, the practical valley girl Anna Svärd, who holds on to her own to the very end and does not want to share with anyone in heaven or on earth, Charlotte Schagerström who lives happily with her husband but still cannot forget Karl-Arthur, the obnoxious Thea Sundler, the "baron of jokes" Göran Löwensköld, a cavalier figure, and the entire Löwensköld family in Karlstad and at Hedeby Farm. The story also weaves in many episodes alongside the plot, fairy tales and folk tales, in Lagerlöf's characteristic narrative style.

== Plot ==
in return has agreed to marry mill owner Schagerström and thus disappear from Karl-Arthur's life. But because of Thea, Karl-Arthur travels with the wrong attitude - he expects his mother to apologize, not for them to reconcile together. When he meets his mother, the colonnade finally realizes how selfish and loveless the son is, and it's more than she can handle. She has a stroke, and the colonel throws Karl-Arthur out of the house.

Anna Svärd returns to her home village in Dalarna filled with dreams of being free from her hard life. She thinks that she will now have a good time as a priest's wife, but after the wedding and once in Korskyrka, it turns out that Karl-Arthur has acquired the wretched farm in the village, because he naively strives to live in poverty. Thea is waiting for them and has already decorated the rooms - Anna will live in the kitchen while Karl-Arthur will stay in the chamber, which has been decorated as a gentleman's room.

Karl-Arthur's ability to engage and captivate people with his fine speech has left him, just as Charlotte predicted in the previous book. Every time he is about to speak in the pulpit, he thinks he sees his mother in the congregation, which makes him lose his mind. Anna figures out that it is Thea who is influencing him, but her attempts to keep Thea from the church fail and lead to further friction between the spouses.

In the previous book, Karl-Arthur magnificently saved an orphaned sibling set of ten children from being separated at a children's auction. They now live in the neighboring farm and Anna takes care of them, which initially moves Karl-Arthur. However, he soon tires of all the laughter and noise that disturbs him when he sits in his chamber. Thea manages to find relatives of the children living far away who can take care of them, and they set off. Anna, who has become pregnant, falls into a deep depression of loss. In a spirit of rebellion, she finally invites two male acquaintances to play cards. Karl-Arthur has an outburst of rage and is thrown into his room. He plans to go after Anna as soon as she is alone, but she locks herself away and when he then goes for a walk in the morning, she leaves the house.

During his walk, Karl-Arthur bumps into Charlotte and they talk about their memories of each other. Schagerström happens to see them and suspects that Charlotte does not love him. He then intentionally causes an accident in his sawmill and is close to death, but reconciles with Charlotte and chooses life.

Karl-Arthur decides to become a wandering priest and wanders aimlessly from his home with Thea in tow. Anna, who went to Karlstad and was helped by Karl-Arthur's sister Jaquette to get a gift of three thousand riksdaler from Colonel Ekenstedt, sees them holding a performance in a market, where Thea attracts the audience with her beautiful singing and Karl-Arthur holds a inspirational sermon. When Anna leaves, she runs into a couple of beggars who are dragging around a bunch of children. It turns out to be the ten siblings that were taken from her, and she takes care of them again.

In the third and final part of the book, the action returns to Hedeby, the lordly seat of the Lion Shields. There, Baron Adrian now lives in great bitterness over having only had five daughters. He desperately wants a son. Then his brother Göran, who in his youth abandoned home and became a tramp, comes to visit during a snowstorm and leaves his child with his brother. Adrian is tricked into thinking it's a boy, but it turns out to be a girl. Göran is found the day after death in a ditch.

Adrian wants to send the niece away, but before that Charlotte comes to visit to adopt one of the girls. She immediately falls for Göran's daughter.

During a walk with Charlotte, the baron's wife talks about the curse resting on the Lion Shields, which was cast by Marit in the first book of the trilogy. Here, it is revealed that Thea is the daughter of Malvina Spaak, who loved the former Baron Adrian and returned General Löwensköld's ring to the family tomb. The wife has also witnessed what Karl-Arthur and Thea have turned into after their years as countrymen. When they now appear at markets, Thea can no longer sing cleanly and Karl-Arthur does not preach, but he scolds everything and everyone, furious and embittered by the turn his life has taken. Violent hatred reigns between him and Thea, and people laugh them off.

When the two women return from their walk, they learn that Thea and Karl-Arthur have been to Hedeby and kidnapped Göran's daughter. Adrian and Charlotte take up the hunt, which ends in disaster. The kidnappers' sleigh goes through the ice and the baron drowns as he tries in vain to save the child. Both die. Marit's prediction is thus fulfilled - three Löwenskölders, Göran, Adrian and the child, have met a violent death.

Charlotte takes the almost insane Karl-Arthur in her sleigh back to Hedeby. He expresses his hatred for the humans and her disgust grows. When Thea and their cronies catch up, Karl-Arthur is about to go to them like a puppet, but then he suddenly pleads with Charlotte for help, as she is the only one who can save him from Thea. They break past the land raiders and make it to Hedeby.

Karl-Arthur then travels to Africa as a missionary, and there he finally learns to love the people. The book ends with him returning to Korskyrka to collect contributions for his business, and comes to visit Anna, who has worked up a fortune with the help of the children and the start-up capital. Whether they actually reconcile is left unclear.

== See also ==
- 1928 in literature
- Swedish literature
