= Sophie Elkan =

Swedish writer and translator (1853-1921)

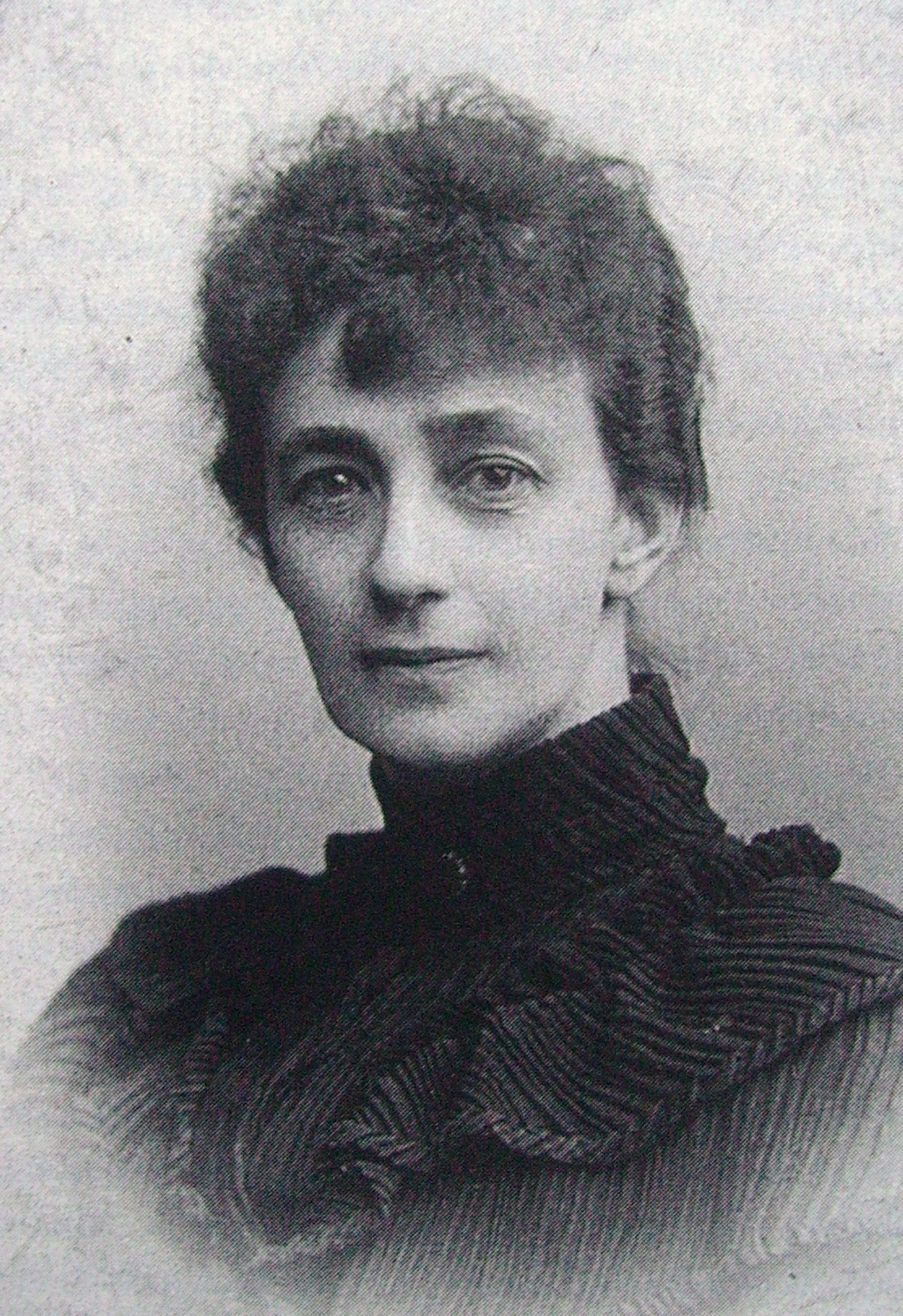
- Sophie Elkan
- Born: 3 January 1853; Gothenburg
- Died: 5 April 1921 (aged 68)
- Occupations: writer, translator

Sophie Elkan (née Salomon; 3 January 1853, Gothenburg – 5 April 1921, Gothenburg) was a Swedish writer and translator.

== Life ==
Sophie Salomon was the daughter of the merchant Alexander Salomon and Henriette Abrahamson. Her parents had migrated to Sweden from Germany. Her elder brother, Otto Salomon was an educator. She was raised in a happy home and affected strongly by her intellectual mother. In 1872 she married her cousin, the music book seller Nathan Elkan (1834-1879), with whom she had a daughter, Kerstin (1877-1879). Her marriage was happy, and the death of both her spouse and daughter in December 1879 with tuberculosis caused a crisis; for the rest of her life, she dressed in black.

As a widow, she began to make translations, publish serials and papers, and debuted as a novelist in 1889. Her first novel, John Hall – en historia från det gamla Göteborg ("John Hall – a story from old Gothenburg"), was an immediate success. As a writer, she made much use of her own life and experiences in her novels.

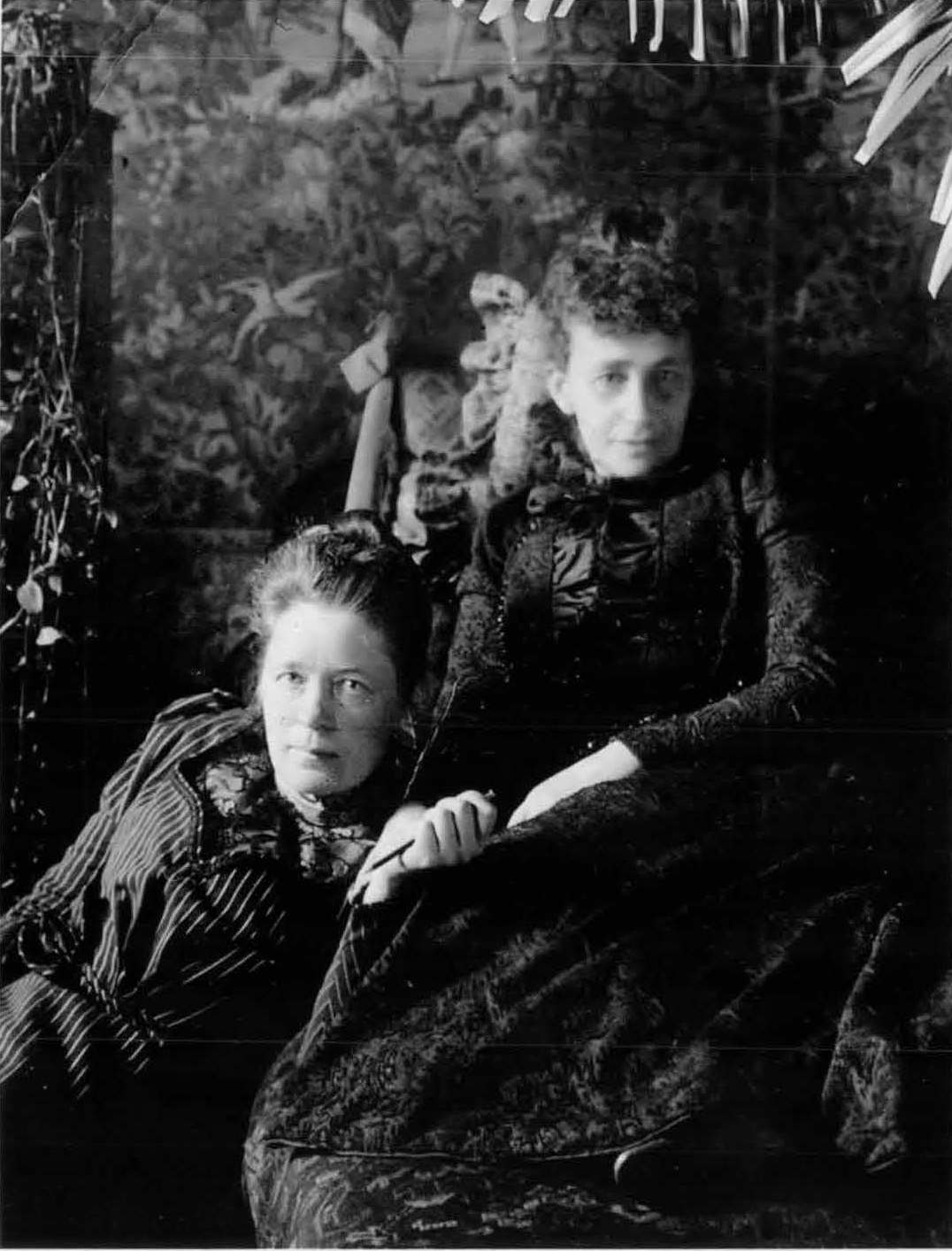
Sophie Elkan & Selma Lagerlöf

As a person, she has been described as egocentric and nervous, but also as hospitable and charming. In 1894, she became acquainted with Selma Lagerlöf, who, as is evident from their correspondence, was in love with her. The two women visited Italy in 1895, and traveled to Egypt, Palestine, Italy, France, Belgium and Holland in 1899. After her death, Lagerlöf inherited her personal possessions, which she used to convert a room in her home Mårbacka into an Elkan museum, known as Elkanrummet (Elkan Room).

== In fiction ==
The relationship between Selma Lagerlöf, Valborg Olander and Sophie Elkan was portrayed in Selma, a TV series written by Åsa Lantz in 2008, with Helena Bergström as Selma Lagerlöf, Ingela Olsson as Valborg Olander and Alexandra Rapaport as Sophie Elkan.

== Works ==
- Dur och moll: skizzer och berättelser. Visby: Gotlands Allehandas tr. 1889.
- Med sordin : Skisser och novelletter. Visby. 1891.
- Rika flickor: berättelse. Stockholm: Fr. Skoglund i distr. 1893.
- Säfve, Kurt & C:o: nutidsberättelse. Stockholm: Skoglund (distr.). 1894.
- Skiftande stämningar: ett novellhäfte. Visby. 1896.
- John Hall: en historia från det gamla Göteborg. Stockholm: Bonnier. 1899.
- Drömmen om österlandet. Nordiskt familjebibliotek, 99-3140236-9; 10. Stockholm: Bonnier. 1901.
- Konungen: en sannsaga. Stockholm: Bonnier. 1904.
- Konungen i landsflykt: en sannsaga. Stockholm: Bonnier. 1906.
- Från östan och västan: en novellbok. Stockholm: Bonnier. 1908.
- Anckarström : en historia från idyllens och revolutionernas tidehvarf.. Stockholm: Bonnier. 1910
- Erdmann, Nils August Bondeson; Ola Hansson; Sophie Elkan; Axel Lundegård; Daniel Fallström. Sveriges national-litteratur, 1500-1900 / utgifvet af Henrik Schück och Ruben G:son Berg, 20. Albert Bonniers, 1912.

== Sources ==
- Heggestad, Eva (1991). Fången och fri: 1880-talets svenska kvinnliga författare om hemmet, yrkeslivet och konstnärskapet. Uppsala: Avd. för litteratursociologi vid Litteraturvetenskapliga institutionen, Univ. Libris 7746142. ISBN 91-85178-19-5
- Sophie Elkan in Nordisk familjebok (second edition, 1907)
- Svenskt författarlexikon: biobibliografisk handbok till Sveriges moderna litteratur. [1, 1900–1940]. Stockholm: Rabén & Sjögren. 1942. sid. 183–184. Libris 113133
