= Charlotte Löwensköld =

1925 novel by Selma Lagerlöf

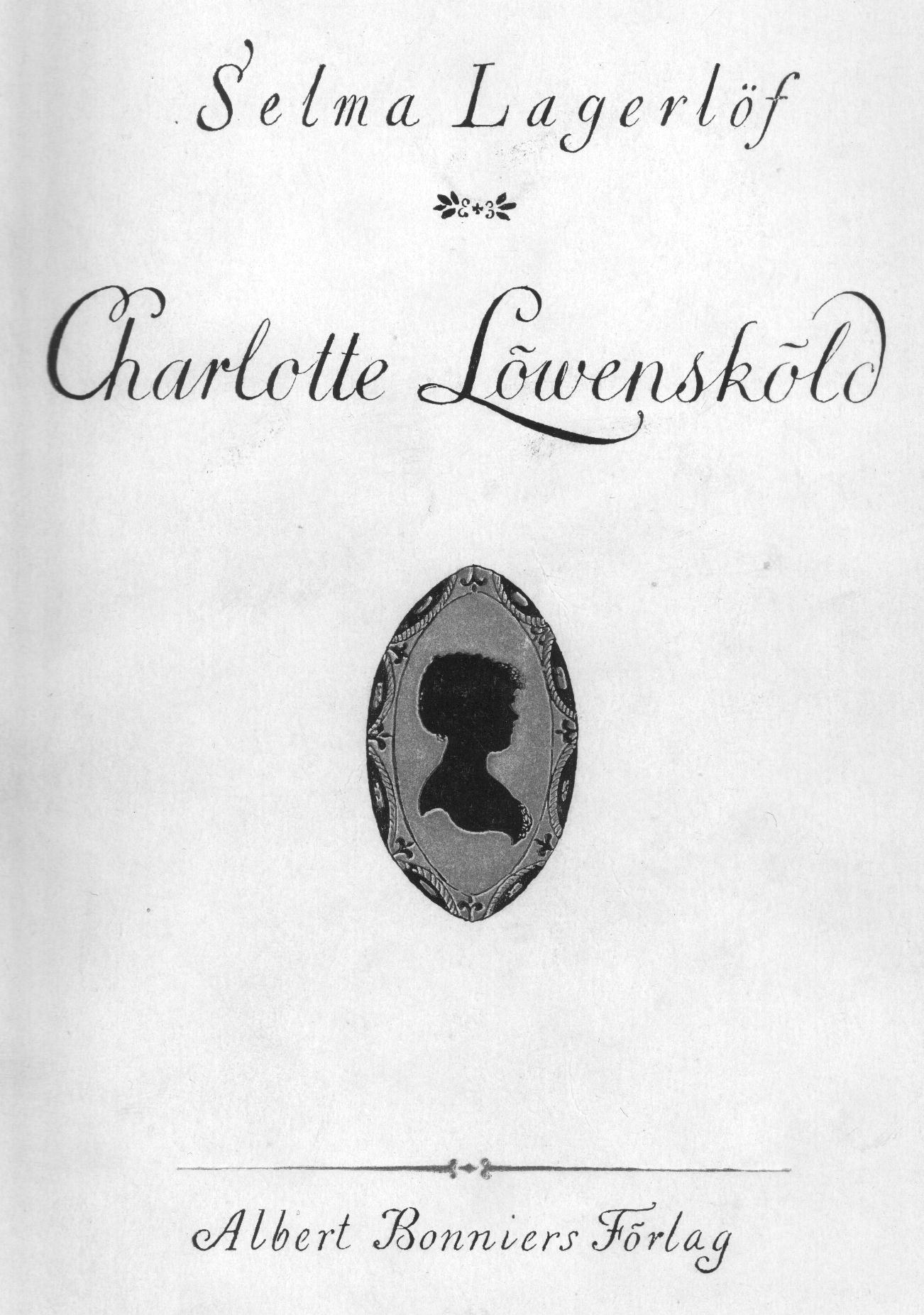
- Author: Selma Lagerlöf
- Translator: Velma Swanston Howard
- Language: Swedish
- Publisher: Bonniers
- Publication date: 1925
- Publication place: Sweden
- English publication date: 1927
- Pages: 381

Charlotte Löwensköld is a 1925 novel by the Swedish writer Selma Lagerlöf. It is the second installment in Lagerlöf's Ring trilogy, or The Ring of the Löwenskölds. Thus it follows The Löwensköld Ring and is followed by Anna Svärd.

Charlotte Löwensköld was first translated into English by Velma Swanston Howard under the original title, and so published by Doubleday, Doran in 1927—prior to the first English-language edition of The Löwensköld Ring.

The novel has been adapted for the screen as a 1930 film, and as a 1979 film starring Ingrid Janbell, both under the original title.

== Plot ==
The novel begins by introducing the colonel Beate Ekenstedt, of the Löwensköld family from Hedeby, later married and living in Karlstad. She is a beautiful, educated woman, but ignores her husband and daughters in favor of her son Karl-Arthur, for whom she has enormous hopes. He is expected to become a great man, but when he studies in Uppsala the fine results do not materialize and he instead becomes deeply religious through his friendship with a pietist, which tears at the rest of the family as his strict views almost ruin his sister's wedding.

A few years later, Karl-Arthur lives as a poor pastor's adjunct with the provost in Korskyrka. He has been engaged for many years to the orphaned but kind-hearted and cheerful Charlotte Löwensköld, who lives on the same farm as the matron's companion. Like Beate, Charlotte dreams of Karl-Arthur becoming the great man they both know he can be, but he himself has no such plans. He has naïve dreams of living in poverty to get closer to God, and plans to get married. When the rich mill owner Schagerström travels past the rectory one day, Charlotte jokes that she would marry him if he proposed.

Schagerström hears about Charlotte's joke and after some thought decides to actually propose to her, but she gives him the basket. He travels his way again deeply impressed by her.

At the same time, the organist's wife, Thea Sundler, is unhappily in love with Karl-Arthur. She is the daughter of Malvina Spaak from the previous book, and as it turns out, she is the one who embodies the deadly curse that rests on the Löwensköld family. With flattery and intriguing revelations, she drives Karl-Arthur and Charlotte apart. Karl-Arthur breaks the engagement and swears that he will marry the first woman he meets on the road, which happens to be the valley girl Anna Svärd.

Thea continues her work and spreads rumors about Charlotte, who, out of love for Karl-Arthur, refuses to defend herself but takes all the blame for the break-up. Schagerström, whose love for Charlotte grows, tries several times to help and set things right but only succeeds in making things worse each time.

The climax is reached when Karl-Arthur breaks with his family when they try to chase Anna Svärd away. Karl-Arthur abandons the family even though his mother falls and is badly injured when she tries to stop him. Charlotte, who loves the colonel like a mother, desperately searches for a way to reconcile the two again, at any cost. The price she has to pay is an agreement with Thea Sundler. Thea is able to persuade Karl-Arthur to travel back to Karlstad and reconcile, but to do so she demands that Charlotte disappear from Karl-Arthur's life - she must marry Schagerström.

Schagerström, who witnessed a large part of the events, and who also sees the colonel as a mother figure, largely understands what is going on, even if he does not have all the details. The wedding is no fun business for him, but he softens when he sees how happy the people at the mill are to have a housewife, and how well Charlotte takes it all. Charlotte also interrupts his attempt to leave on the wedding night and objects to his plan to file for divorce as soon as possible. She doesn't love him, but she knows she can.

The sequel Anna Svärd picks up directly where this book ends, with Karl-Arthur going to Karlstad.

== See also ==
- 1925 in literature
- Swedish literature
