= Tullius Hammargren =

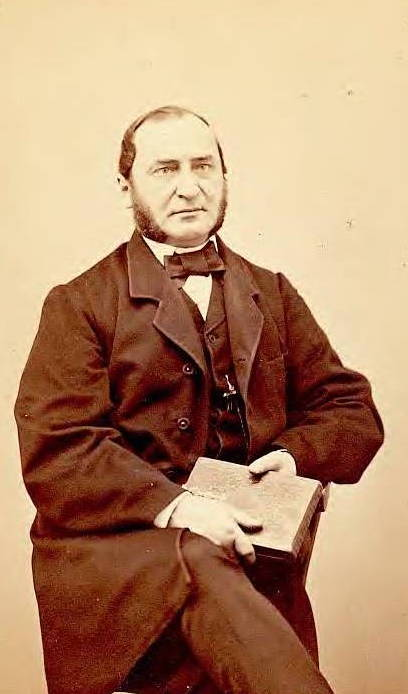
- Born: Erik Tullius Hammargren; 18 October 1814; Karlstad, Sweden
- Died: 14 February 1899 (aged 84); Karlskoga, Sweden
- Occupation(s): Lutheran priest, ornithologist, textbook writer
- Employer: Church of Sweden
- Spouse: Ottiliana Lagerlöf

Erik Tullius Hammargren (18 October 1814 – 14 February 1899) was a Swedish Lutheran priest, ornithologist, and textbook writer.

== Life and work ==
Erik Tullius Hammargren was born in Karlstad in 1814 to vicar Anders Hammargren and Sara Johanna Piscator.

Hammagren became a student in Lund in 1832 and obtained a master's degree in philosophy in 1838. He enrolled in the medical faculty at Uppsala University in 1840.

Hammargren worked as a teacher at a school in Åmål, Dalsland from 1837 to 1852. He served as the vicar of the Karlskoga parish from 1867 to 1899.

In 1875, the celebrated Swedish author and Nobel Prize laureate, Selma Lagerlöf, resided with him, alongside his spouse, Ottiliana Lagerlöf, who happened to be her aunt at the Karlskoga Church Rectory. During that period, Selma Lagerlöf was one of his confirmation students.

Hammargren died in 1899 at the age of 85.

== Works ==
- Jordklotets utvecklingshistoria (1854)
- Väderleks-lärans naturvetenskapliga grunder jemte förklaring öfver de märkvärdigaste företeelser i luftkretsen (1858)
