= Selma Lagerlöf =

Swedish author (1858–1940)

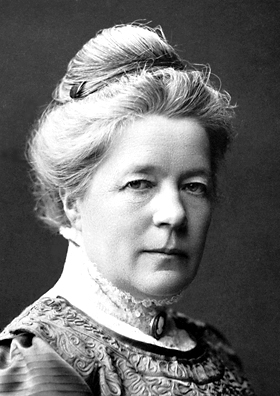
- Lagerlöf in 1909
- Born: Selma Ottilia Lovisa Lagerlöf; 20 November 1858; Mårbacka, Sweden
- Died: 16 March 1940 (aged 81); Mårbacka, Sweden
- Occupation: Writer
- Writing career
- Notable awards: Nobel Prize in Literature; 1909

Selma Ottilia Lovisa Lagerlöf (/ˈlɑːɡərlɜːf, -lɜːv/, US also /-lʌv, -ləv/; Swedish: [ˈsɛ̂lːma ˈlɑ̂ːɡɛˌɭøːv]; 20 November 1858 – 16 March 1940) was a Swedish writer. She published her first novel, Gösta Berling's Saga, at the age of 33. She was the first woman to win the Nobel Prize in Literature, which she was awarded in 1909. In 1914, she was the first woman to be granted a membership of the Swedish Academy.

== Life ==
=== Early years ===
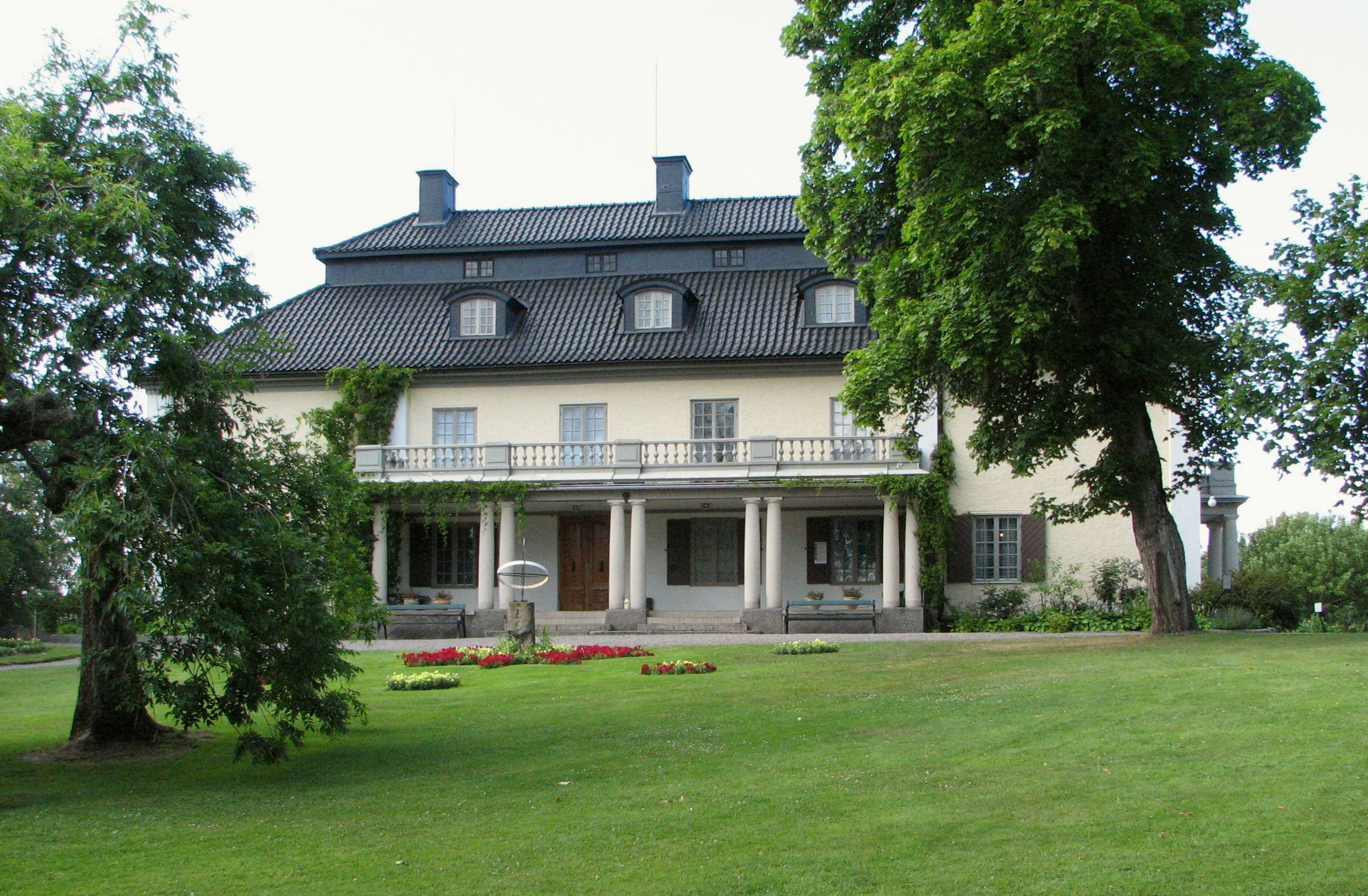
Lagerlöf family home at Mårbacka, Värmland

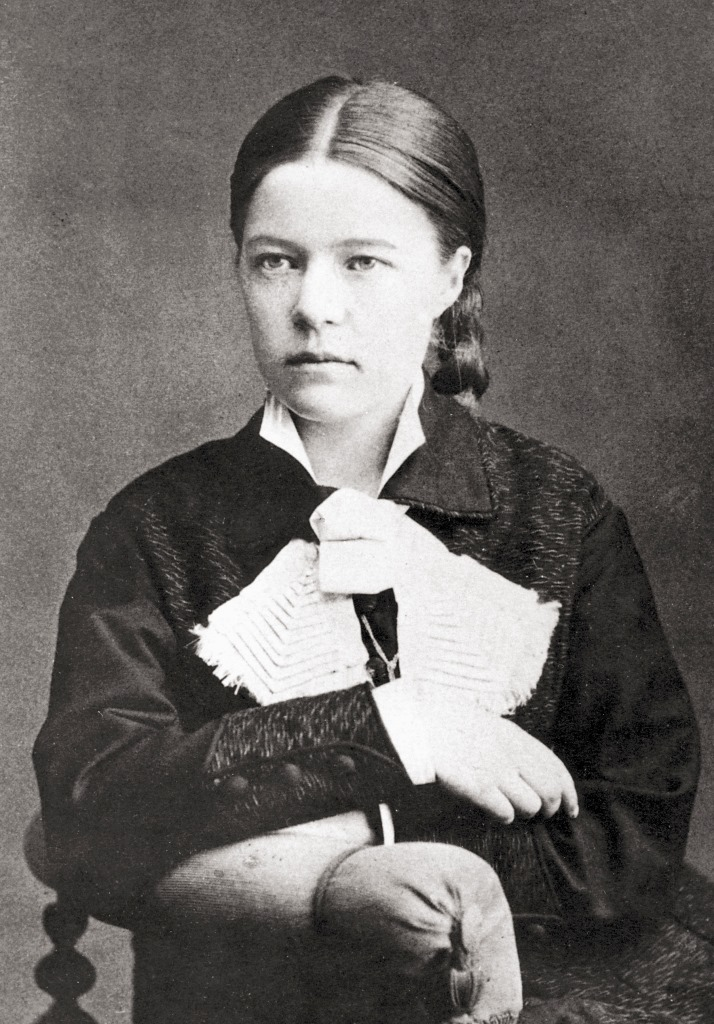
Lagerlöf in 1881

Selma Ottilia Lovisa Lagerlöf was born on 20 November 1858 at Mårbacka, Värmland, Kingdoms of Sweden and Norway. Lagerlöf was the daughter of Erik Gustaf Lagerlöf, a lieutenant in the Royal Värmland Regiment, and Louise Lagerlöf (née Wallroth), whose father was a well-to-do merchant and a foundry owner (brukspatron). Lagerlöf was the couple's fifth child out of six. She was born with a hip injury, which was caused by detachment in the hip joint. At the age of three and a half, a sickness left her lame in both legs, although she later recovered.

She was a quiet, serious child with a deep love of reading. She wrote poetry but did not publish anything until later in life. Her grandmother helped raise her, often telling stories of fairytales and fantasy. Growing up, she was plain and slightly lame, and an account stated that the cross-country wanderings of Margarethe and Elisabet in Gösta Berling's Saga could be the author's compensatory fantasies. She received her schooling at home since the Folkskola compulsory education system was not fully developed yet. She studied English and French. After reading Osceola by Thomas Mayne Reid at the age of seven, she decided she would be a writer when she grew up.

In 1875, Lagerlöf lived in the Karlskoga Church Rectory alongside Erik Tullius Hammargren and his wife, Ottiliana Lagerlöf, who was her aunt, during which time she was one of Hammargren's confirmation students.

The sale of the Lagerlöf family's Mårbacka estate in 1884 had a serious impact on her development. Selma's father is said to have been an alcoholic, something she rarely discussed. Her father did not want Selma to continue her education or be involved with the women's movement. Later in life, she bought back her father's estate with the money she received for her Nobel Prize. Lagerlöf lived there for the rest of her life.

=== Teaching life ===
Lagerlöf studied at the Högre lärarinneseminariet in Stockholm from 1882 to 1885. She worked as a country schoolteacher at a high school for girls in Landskrona from 1885 to 1895. Through her studies at the Royal Women's Superior Training Academy in Stockholm, Lagerlöf reacted against the realism of contemporary Swedish-language writers such as August Strindberg. She began her first novel, Gösta Berling's Saga, while working as a teacher in Landskrona. Her first break as a writer came when she submitted the first chapters to a literary contest in the magazine Idun, and won a publishing contract for the whole book. At first, her writing only received mild reviews from critics. Once a popular critic, Georg Brandes, had given her positive reviews of the Danish translation, her popularity soared. She received financial support from Fredrika Limnell, who wished to enable her to concentrate on her writing.

== Literary career ==
A visit in 1900 to the American Colony in Jerusalem became the inspiration for Lagerlöf's book by that name. The royal family and the Swedish Academy gave her substantial financial support to continue her passion. Jerusalem was also acclaimed by critics, who began comparing her to Homer and Shakespeare, so that she became a popular figure both in Sweden and abroad. By 1895, she gave up her teaching to devote herself to her writing. With the help of proceeds from Gösta Berling's Saga and a scholarship and grant, she made two journeys, which were largely instrumental in providing material for her next novel. With her close friend Sophie Elkan, she traveled to Italy, and also to Palestine and Egypt. In Italy, a legend of a Christ Child figure that had been replaced with a false version inspired Lagerlöf's novel Antikrists mirakler (The Miracles of the Antichrist). Set in Sicily, the novel explores the interplay between Christian and socialist moral systems. However, most of Lagerlöf's stories were set in Värmland.

In 1902, Lagerlöf was asked by the National Teachers' Association to write a geography book for children. She wrote Nils Holgerssons underbara resa genom Sverige (The Wonderful Adventures of Nils), a novel about a boy from the southernmost part of Sweden, who had been shrunk to the size of a thumb and who travelled on the back of a goose across the country. Lagerlöf mixed historical and geographical facts about the provinces of Sweden with the tale of the boy's adventures, detailing how he managed to return home and was restored to his normal size. The novel is one of Lagerlöf's most well-known books, and it has been translated into more than 30 languages.

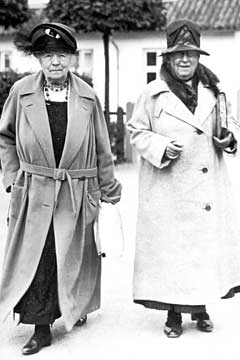
Lagerlöf with her friend and literary assistant Valborg Olander. Elkan was jealous of the relationship.

She moved to Falun in 1897 and met Valborg Olander, who became her literary assistant and friend, but Elkan's jealousy of Olander was a complication in the relationship. Olander, a teacher, was also active in the growing women's suffrage movement in Sweden. Selma Lagerlöf herself was active as a speaker for the National Association for Women's Suffrage, which was beneficial for the organisation because of the great respect which surrounded Lagerlöf, and she spoke at the International Suffrage Congress in Stockholm in June 1911, where she gave the opening address, as well as at the victory party of the Swedish suffrage movement after women suffrage had been granted in May 1919.

Selma Lagerlöf was a friend of the German-Jewish writer Nelly Sachs. Shortly before her death in 1940, Lagerlöf intervened with the Swedish royal family to secure the release of Sachs and Sachs' aged mother from Nazi Germany, on the last flight from Germany to Sweden, and their lifelong asylum in Stockholm.

== Personal life ==
=== Relationships ===
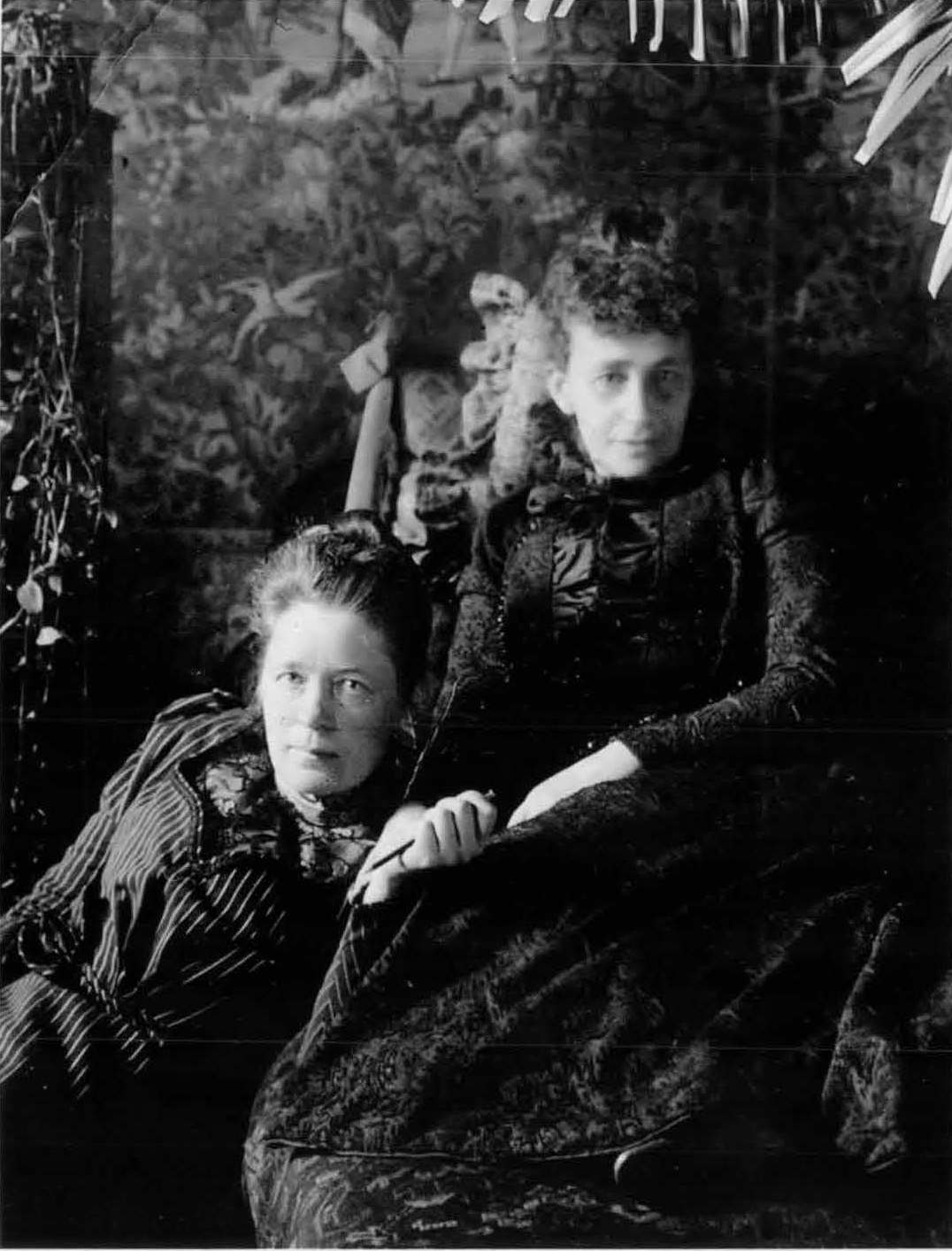
Lagerlöf with the writer Sophie Elkan (right)

In 1894, she met the Swedish writer Sophie Elkan, who became her friend and companion. Over many years, Elkan and Lagerlöf critiqued each other's work. Lagerlöf wrote that Elkan strongly influenced her work and that she often disagreed sharply with the direction Lagerlöf wanted to take in her books. Lagerlöf's letters to Elkan were published in 1993, titled Du lär mig att bli fri (You Teach Me to Be Free).

Beginning in the 1900s, she also had a close relationship with Valborg Olander, who had some influence as a literary adviser, agent, and secretary of sorts as well; their correspondence was published in 2006 as En riktig författarhustru (A Proper Writer's Wife). There appears to have been a strong rivalry between Elkan and Olander. Both relationships were close, emotional, exclusive and described in terms suggestive of love, the boundary between expressions of friendship and love being somewhat vague at the time. Still, it is primarily the surviving correspondence with Olander that contains passages implying decidedly erotic and physical passion, even though Lagerlöf took care to destroy many of the letters she found too risky. Homosexual relations between women were taboo as well as illegal in Sweden at the time, so none of the women involved ever revealed such a relationship publicly.

== Literary adaptations ==
In 1919, Lagerlöf sold all the movie rights to all of her as-yet unpublished works to Swedish Cinema Theatre (Swedish: Svenska Biografteatern), so over the years, many movie versions of her works were made. During the era of Swedish silent cinema, her works were used in film by Victor Sjöström, Mauritz Stiller, and other Swedish film makers. Sjöström's retelling of Lagerlöf's tales about rural Swedish life, in which his camera recorded the detail of traditional village life and the Swedish landscape, provided the basis of some of the most poetic and memorable products of silent cinema. The 1921 film adaptation of Thy Soul Shall Bear Witness! (Körkarlen) was critically acclaimed and influential within cinema. Jerusalem was adapted in 1996 into the internationally acclaimed film of the same name.

== Awards ==
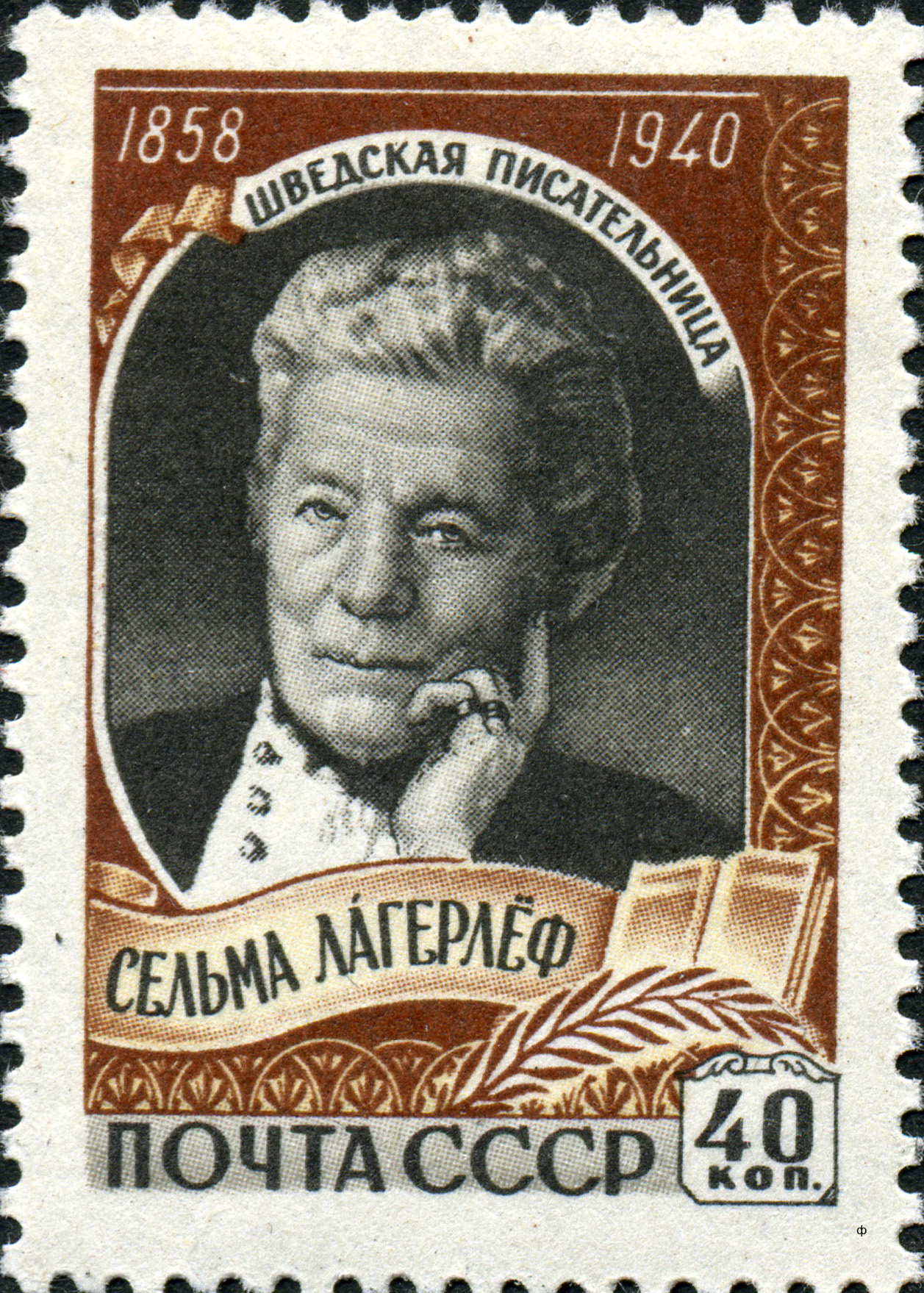
Lagerlöf on a 1959 postage stamp of the Soviet Union

On 10 December 1909, Selma Lagerlöf won the Nobel Prize "in appreciation of the lofty idealism, vivid imagination, and spiritual perception that characterize her writings", but the decision was preceded by harsh internal power struggle within the Swedish Academy, the body that awards the Nobel Prize in Literature. During her acceptance speech, she told a story of her father, as she 'visited him in heaven'. In the story, she asks her father for help with the debt she owes and her father explains the debt is from all the people who supported her throughout her career. In 1904, the academy had awarded her its great gold medal, and in 1914, she also became a member of the academy. For both the academy membership and her Nobel literature prize, she was the first woman to be so honored. She was awarded the Litteris et Artibus in 1909 and the Illis quorum in 1926.

In 1907, she received the honorary degree of doctor of letters (filosofie hedersdoktor) from Uppsala University. In 1928, she received an honorary doctorate from the University of Greifswald's Faculty of Arts. At the start of World War II, she sent her Nobel Prize medal and gold medal from the Swedish Academy to the government of Finland to help raise money to fight the Soviet Union. The Finnish government was so touched that it raised the necessary money by other means and returned her medal to her.

== Legacy ==
In 1983, the Sunne Municipality in Värmland County founded the Selma Lagerlöf Prize, awarded to an author writing in the spirit of Lagerlöf. Recipients receive 100,000 Swedish kronor.

In 1991, she became the first woman to be depicted on a Swedish banknote, when the first 20-kronor note was released.

A flight of steps connecting two streets is named after her in Jerusalem, Israel.

Two hotels are named after her in Östra Ämtervik in Sunne, and her home, Mårbacka, is preserved as a museum.

== Works ==
Original Swedish-language publications are listed primarily.

The popularity of Lagerlöf in the United States was due in part to Velma Swanston Howard, or V. S. Howard (1868–1937, a suffragette and Christian scientist) – who was an early believer in her appeal to Americans and who carefully translated many of her books.

=== Novels ===
- Gösta Berlings saga (1891). Translated as The Story of Gösta Berling (Pauline Bancroft Flach, 1898), Gösta Berling's Saga (V.S. Howard and Lillie Tudeer, 1898), The Story of Gösta Berling (Robert Bly, 1962), The Saga of Gosta Berling (Paul Norlen, 2009)
- Antikrists mirakler (1897). Translated as The Miracles of Antichrist (Selma Ahlström Trotz, 1899) and The Miracles of Antichrist (Pauline Bancroft Flach (1869–1966), 1899)
- En herrgårdssägen (1899) Translated as A Manor House Tale (Peter Graves, 2015)
- Herr Arnes penningar (1903). Translated as Herr Arne's Hoard (Arthur G. Chater, 1923; Philip Brakenridge, 1952) and The Treasure (Arthur G. Chater, 1925) – adapted as the 1919 film Sir Arne's Treasure.
- Nils Holgerssons underbara resa genom Sverige (1906–07; for children). Translated as The Wonderful Adventures of Nils (V.S. Howard, 1907; Richard E. Oldenburg, 1967) and Further Adventures of Nils (V.S. Howard, 1911)
- Liljecronas hem (1911). Translated as Liliecrona's Home (Anna Barwell, 1913)
- Körkarlen (1912). Translated as Thy Soul Shall Bear Witness! (William Frederick Harvey, 1921). Filmed as The Phantom Carriage, The Phantom Chariot, The Stroke of Midnight.
- Kejsarn av Portugallien (1914). Translated as The Emperor of Portugallia (V.S. Howard, 1916)
- Bannlyst (1918). Translated as The Outcast (W. Worster, 1920/22)

=== Series ===
- Jerusalem:
1. Jerusalem: två berättelser. 1, I Dalarne (1901; novel). Translated as Jerusalem (Jessie Bröchner, 1903; V.S. Howard, 1914)
2. Jerusalem: två berättelser. 2, I det heliga landet (1902; novel). Translated as The Holy City: Jerusalem II (V.S. Howard, 1918)
- The Ring trilogy – published in 1931 as The Ring of the Löwenskölds, containing the Martin and Howard translations, LCCN 31-985
1. Löwensköldska ringen (1925; novel). Translated as The General's Ring (Francesca Martin, 1928) and as The Löwensköld Ring (Linda Schenck, 1991)
2. Charlotte Löwensköld (1925; novel). Translated as Charlotte Löwensköld (V.S. Howard)
3. Anna Svärd (1928; novel). Translated as Anna Svärd (V.S. Howard, 1931)

=== Short stories ===
- Osynliga länkar (1894). Translated as Invisible Links (Pauline Bancroft Flach, (1869–1966) 1899)
- Drottningar i Kungahälla (1899). Translated as The Queens of Kungahälla and Other Sketches From a Swedish Homestead (Jessie Bröchner, 1901; C. Field, 1917)
- En herrgårdssägen (1899). Translated as The Tale of a Manor and Other Sketches (C. Field, 1922)
- Kristuslegender (1904). Translated as Christ Legends and Other Stories (V. S. Howard, 1908)
- En saga om en saga och andra sagor (1908). Translated as The Girl from the Marsh Croft (V.S. Howard, 1910) and Girl from the Marsh Croft and Other Stories (edited by Greta Anderson, 1996)
- Astrid och andra berättelser (1914)
- Silvergruvan och andra berättelser (1915)
- Troll och Människor (1915, 1921). Translated as The Changeling (Susanna Stevens, 1992)
- Kavaljersnoveller (1918), with illustrations by Einar Nerman
- Mors porträtt och andra berättelser (1930)
- Höst (1933). Translated as Harvest (Florence and Naboth Hedin, 1935)
- Julberättelser (Christmas Stories) (1938)

=== Non-Fiction ===
- Hem och stat: Föredrag vid rösträttskongressen den 13 juni 1911 (1911). Translated as Home and State: Being an Address Delivered at Stockholm at the Sixth Convention of the International Woman Suffrage Alliance, June 1911 (C. Ursula Holmstedt, 1912)
- Dunungen: Lustspel i fyra akter (1914)* Zachris Topelius utveckling och mognad (1920), biography of Zachris Topelius

=== Memoirs ===
1. Mårbacka (1922). Translated as Marbacka: The Story of a Manor (V.S. Howard, 1924) and Memories of Marbacka (Greta Andersen, 1996) – named for the estate Mårbacka where Lagerlöf was born and raised
2. Ett barns memoarer: Mårbacka (1930). Translated as Memories of My Childhood: Further Years at Mårbacka (V.S. Howard, 1934)
3. Dagbok för Selma Ottilia Lovisa Lagerlöf (1932). Translated as The Diary of Selma Lagerlöf (V.S. Howard, 1936)

=== Plays ===
- Sankta Annas kloster (skådespel, uppfört 1895, men utgivet först 2021) - Saint Anne's Monastery
- Fritiofs saga The Sublunar Society. 2019. Libris ISBN 9789188221957 (operalibretto, skrivet på 1890-talet, men utgivet först 2019) - Fritiof's saga
- Stormyrtossen: Folkskädespel i 4 akter (1913) with Bernt Fredgren
- Gerhart Hauptmann: Vinterballaden (Winterballade: Tragödie: Versdrama in 7 Szenen, 1917, bygger i sin tur på Lagerlöfs Herr Arnes penningar) - translation (The Winter Ballad: A verse drama tragedy in 7 scenes based on Herr Arne's Hoard)
- En Herrgårdssägen: Skådespel i fyra akter (1929), based on 1899 work En herrgårdssägen
- Gösta Berlings saga: Skådespel i fyra akter med prolog och epilog efter romanen med samma namn (1936)
- Dockteaterspel (1959)

=== Speech ===
Tal : textkritisk utgåva / utgiven av Petra Söderlund och Ilaria Tedde; inledning av Brigitte Mral; huvudredaktör: Petra Söderlund... Stockholm: Svenska vitterhetssamfundet (SVS). 2016. Libris 19446370. ISBN 9789172301795 - Speech : text-critical edition / edited by Petra Söderlund and Ilaria Tedde; introduction by Brigitte Mral; editor-in-chief: Petra Söderlund

=== Miscellaneous ===
- Från skilda tider: Efterlämnade skrifter (1943–45)

=== Poetry ===
- Madame de Castro: En ungdomsdikt (1984)

== See also ==
- List of female Nobel laureates

Cultural offices
Preceded by Albert Theodor Gellerstedt	Swedish Academy, Seat No.7; 1914–1940	Succeeded by Hjalmar Gullberg
