= Maj-Britt Nilsson =

Swedish actress

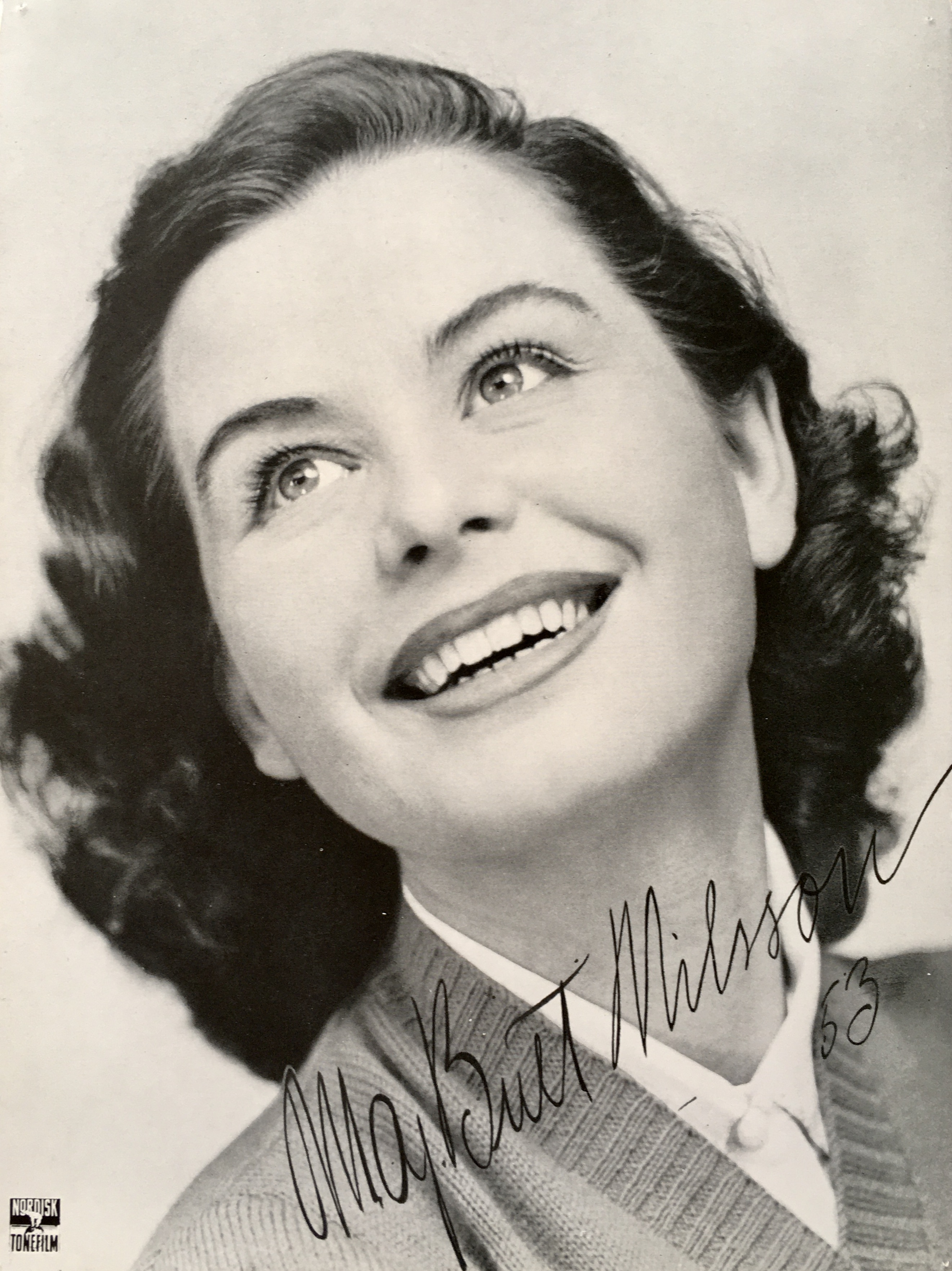
- Born: Maj-Britt Nilsson; 11 December 1924; Stockholm, Sweden
- Died: 19 December 2006 (aged 82); Cannes, France
- Occupation: Actress
- Years active: 1941–1977
- Spouse: Per Gerhard (1951–2006; her death)
- Children: Karl

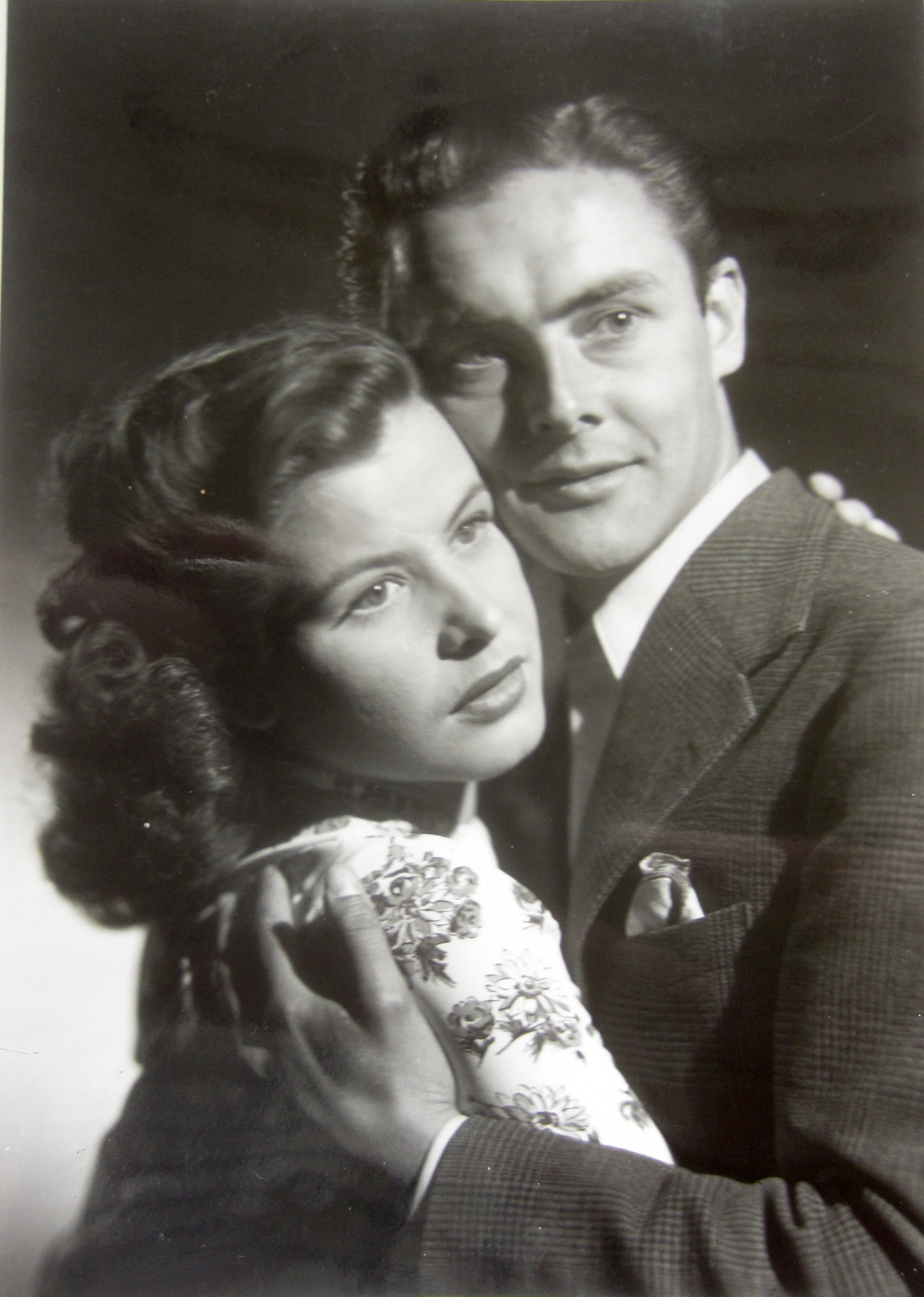
Maj-Britt Nilsson and Lars Nordrum in Resan bort from 1945. Photo by Louis Huch.

Maj-Britt Nilsson (11 December 1924 – 19 December 2006) was a Swedish film actress of the 1940s and 1950s.

== Biography ==
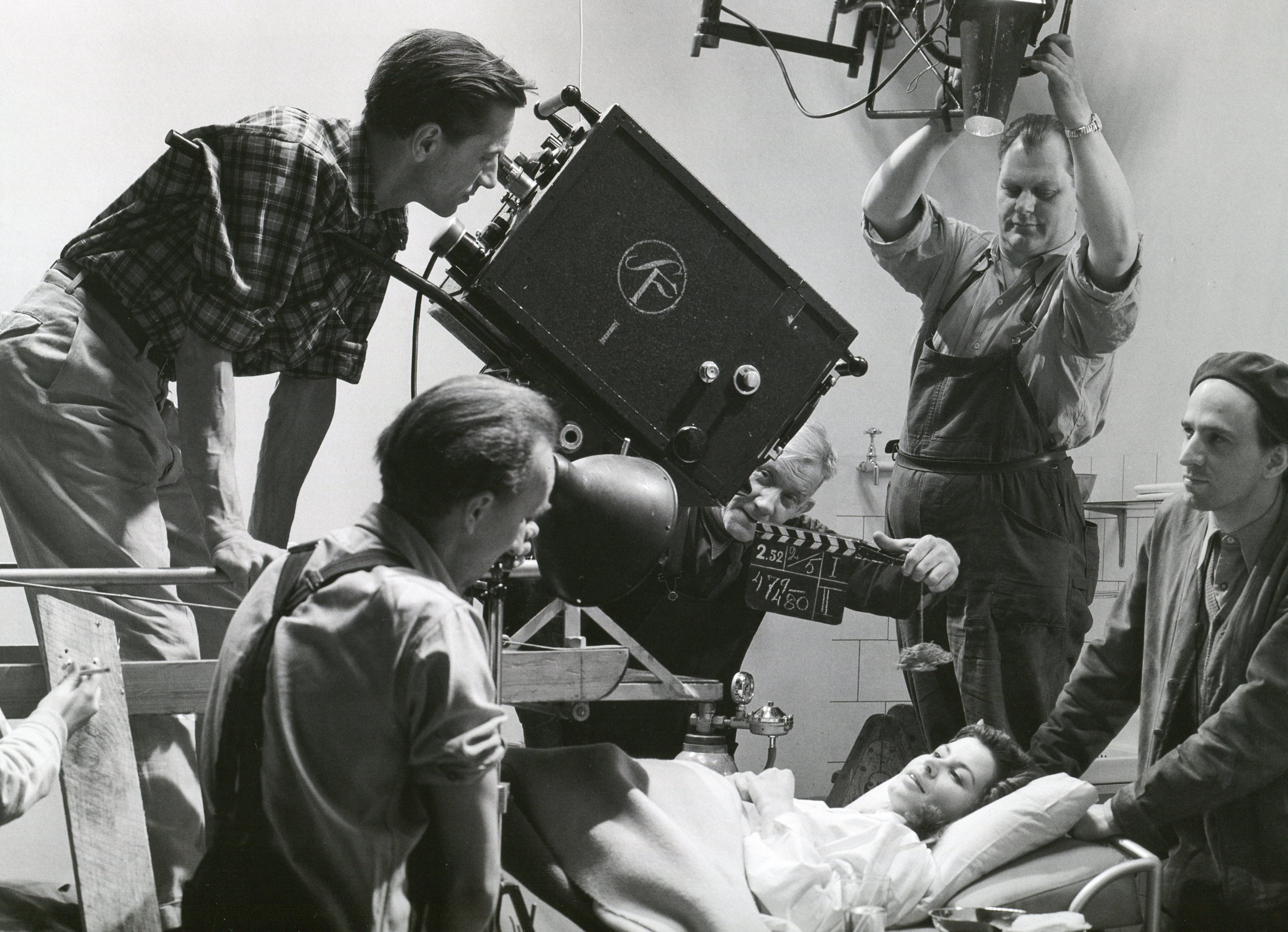
Gunnar Fischer (behind the camera), Nilsson (lying down) and Ingmar Bergman (extreme right) on the set of Secrets of Women, 1952

Nilsson was born in Stockholm, and trained there at the drama school of the Royal Dramatic Theatre. She appeared in three Ingmar Bergman films: Till Glädje (To Joy, 1950), Sommarlek (Summer Interlude or Illicit Interlude, 1951), and Kvinnors Väntan (Secrets of Women or Waiting Women, 1952). She also appeared in the English-language film A Matter of Morals (1961), directed in Sweden by John Cromwell.

Maj-Britt Nilsson died in Cannes, France, aged 82. Her death, which was not widely reported outside Sweden, was confirmed by Jon Asp, executive editor of the online publication Ingmar Bergman Face to Face. No cause was announced.

== Personal life ==
In 1951, she married Per Gerhard, a theater director and son of Karl Gerhard, a prominent Swedish singer, who survived her by five years.

== Filmography ==
- Vårat gäng directed by Gunnar Skoglund (1942)
- The Journey Away by Alf Sjöberg (1945)
- Affairs of a Model by Gustaf Molander (1946)
- Maria by Gösta Folke (1947)
- The Street by Gösta Werner (1949)
- The Girl from the Third Row by Hasse Ekman (1949)
- Sjösalavår by Per Gunvall (1949)
- To Joy by Ingmar Bergman (1950)
- Summer Interlude by Ingmar Bergman (1951)
- For the Sake of My Intemperate Youth by Arne Mattsson (1952)
- Secrets of Women by Ingmar Bergman (1952)
- We Three Debutantes by Hasse Ekman (1953)
- Wild Birds by Alf Sjöberg (1955)
- Swedish Girl by Håkan Bergström and Thomas Engel (1955)
- A Little Nest by Arne Mattsson (1956)
- Egen ingång by Hasse Ekman (1956)
- Was die Schwalbe sang by Géza von Bolváry (German film; 1956)
- The Girl in Tails by Arne Mattsson (1956)
- The Jazz Boy by Hasse Ekman (1958)
- The Forests Sing Forever by Paul May (1959)
- The Inheritance of Bjorndal by Gustav Ucicky (Austrian film; 1960)
- A Matter of Morals (De sista stegen) by John Cromwell (American-Swedish film; 1961)
- Lita på mej, älskling! by Sven Lindberg (1961)
- En enkel melodi by Kjell Grede (1974)
- Bluff Stop by Jonas Cornell (1977)
