= To Joy (film) =

1950 film by Ingmar Bergman

- DVD cover
- Directed by: Ingmar Bergman
- Written by: Ingmar Bergman
- Produced by: Allan Ekelund
- Starring: Maj-Britt Nilsson; Stig Olin; Birger Malmsten
- Edited by: Oscar Rosander
- Release date: 20 February 1950
- Running time: 98 minutes
- Country: Sweden
- Language: Swedish

To Joy (Swedish: Till glädje) is a 1950 Swedish film directed and written by Ingmar Bergman about a young married couple who play together in a Swedish orchestra.

== Plot ==
Stig and Marta are two violinists playing in the orchestra directed by Sönderby. They wed, but Stig's ambition is overwhelming and his ego, oversized. The difficulties the couple encounters in its day-to-day life, as well as Stig's inability to accept the career of a soloist embitter the man. He starts seeing Mikael Bro, an old swinger friend, and his wife Nelly, who form a sulfurous couple.

== Cast ==
- Maj-Britt Nilsson as Marta Olsson
- Stig Olin as Stig Eriksson
- Birger Malmsten as Marcel
- John Ekman as Mikael Bro
- Margit Carlqvist as Nelly Bro
- Victor Sjöström as Sönderby
