= Elisabeth Epp =

Austrian actress

- Born: 26 January 1910; Cologne, German Empire
- Died: 29 October 2000 (aged 90); Vienna, Austria
- Occupation: Actress
- Years active: 1949-1992

Elisabeth Eschbaum (26 January 1910 - 29 October 2000) was a German actress. She appeared in more than twenty films from 1949 to 1992.

== Selected filmography ==
Year	Title	Role	Notes
1976	I Want to Live		
1963	The Model Boy	Mathilde Pacher	
1960	The Inheritance of Bjorndal	Old Kruse	
1959	The Forests Sing Forever	Jungfer Kruse	
1954	Victoria in Dover		
1957	The Unexcused Hour		
