= The Inheritance of Bjorndal =

1960 film

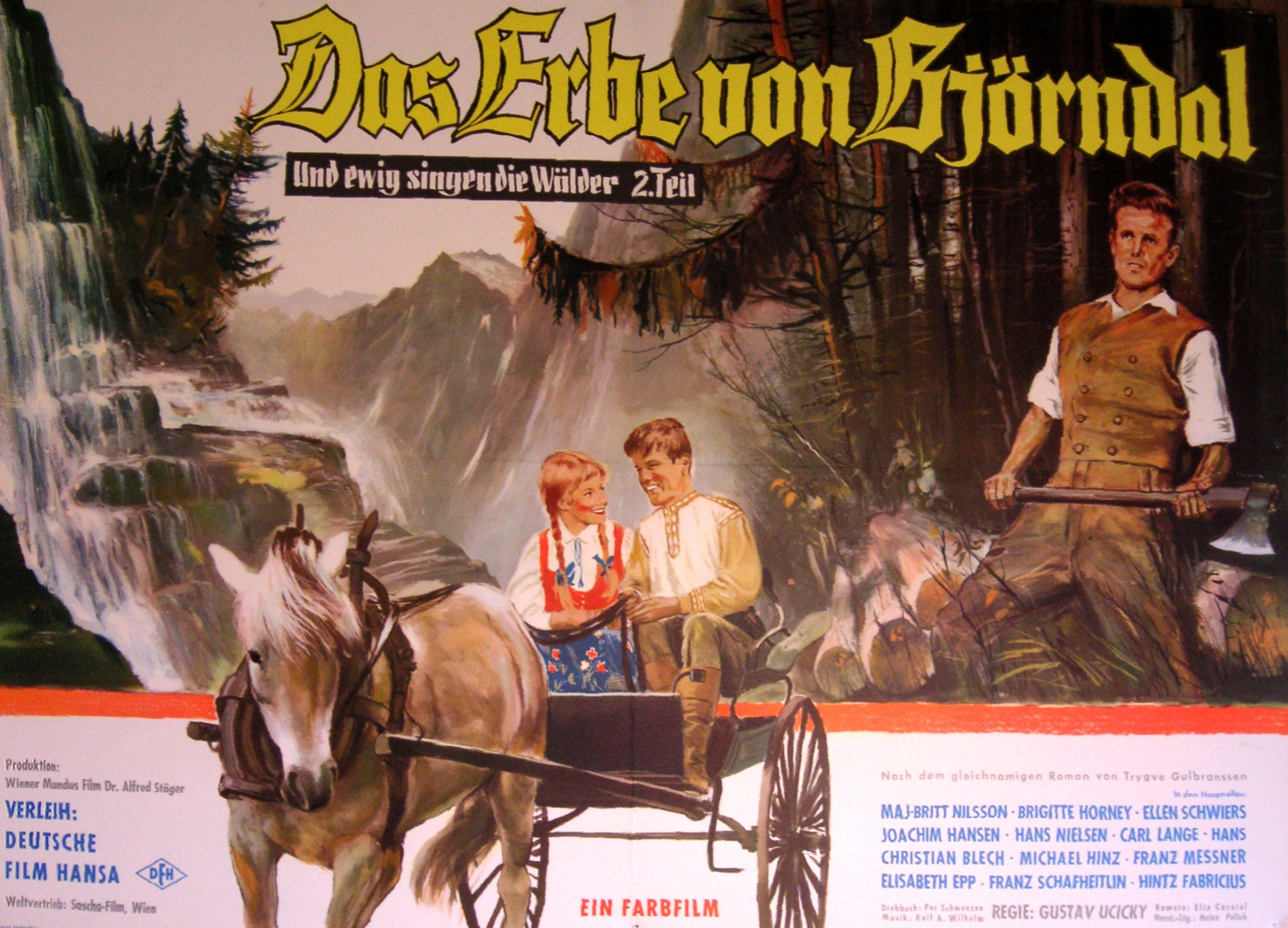
- Theatrical release poster
- Directed by: Gustav Ucicky
- Written by: Trygve Gulbranssen (novel); Per Schwenzen
- Produced by: Heinz Pollak; Alfred Stöger
- Starring: Maj-Britt Nilsson; Brigitte Horney; Ellen Schwiers
- Cinematography: Elio Carniel
- Edited by: Renate Jelinek
- Music by: Rolf A. Wilhelm
- Production companies: Wien-Film; Wiener Mundus-Film
- Distributed by: Deutsche Film Hansa
- Release date: 28 October 1960
- Running time: 96 minutes
- Country: Austria
- Language: German

The Inheritance of Bjorndal (German: Das Erbe von Björndal) is a 1960 Austrian drama film directed by Gustav Ucicky and starring Maj-Britt Nilsson, Brigitte Horney and Ellen Schwiers. It is the sequel to the 1959 film The Forests Sing Forever.

The film's art direction was by Leo Metzenbauer.

== Cast ==
- Maj-Britt Nilsson as Adelheid
- Brigitte Horney as Tante Eleonore
- Ellen Schwiers as Gunvor
- Joachim Hansen as Dag
- Hans Nielsen as Major a.D. Barre
- Carl Lange as Mr. von Gall
- Hans Christian Blech as Aslak, Gunvor's Husband
- Michael Hinz as Adelheid's Son
- Franz Messner as Lorenz
- Elisabeth Epp as Old Kruse
- Gertraud Jesserer as Barbara
- Franz Schafheitlin as Shopkeeper Holder
- Fritz Hinz-Fabricius as Priest Ramer
- Ladislaus Hillinger

== Bibliography ==
- Robert von Dassanowsky. Austrian Cinema: A History. McFarland, 2005.
