= The Journey Away =

1945 film

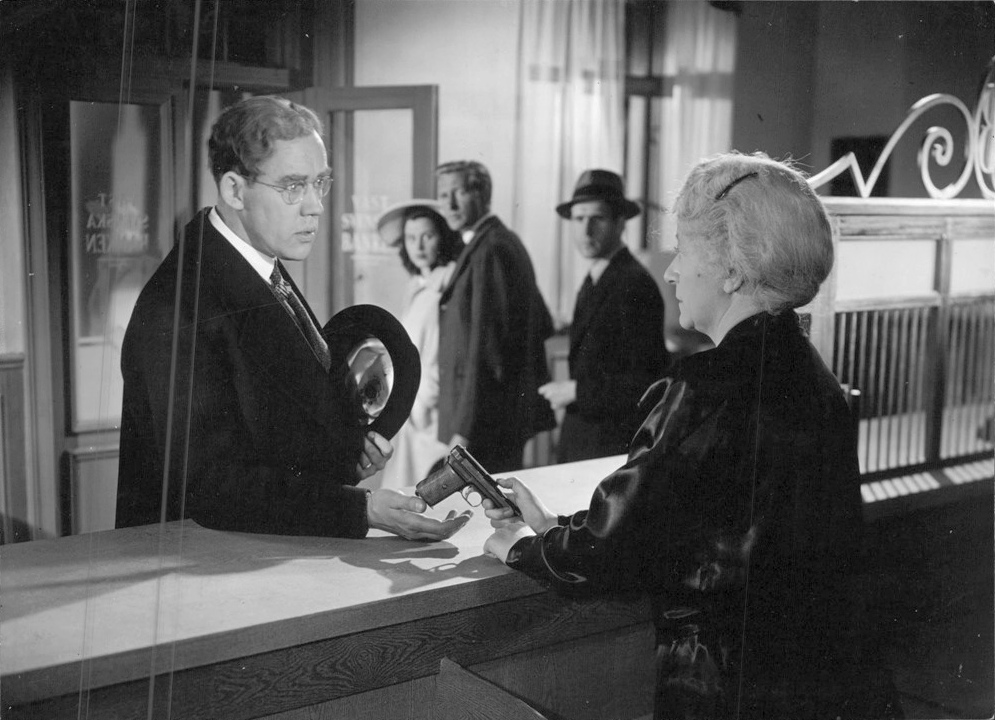
- Still with Holger Löwenadler and Hjördis Petterson
- Directed by: Alf Sjöberg
- Written by: Karl Ragnar Gierow; Alf Sjöberg
- Starring: Gunn Wållgren; Holger Löwenadler; Maj-Britt Nilsson
- Cinematography: Martin Bodin
- Edited by: Oscar Rosander
- Music by: Nils Castegren
- Production company: Svensk Filmindustri
- Distributed by: Svensk Filmindustri
- Release date: 26 December 1945
- Running time: 96 minutes
- Country: Sweden
- Language: Swedish

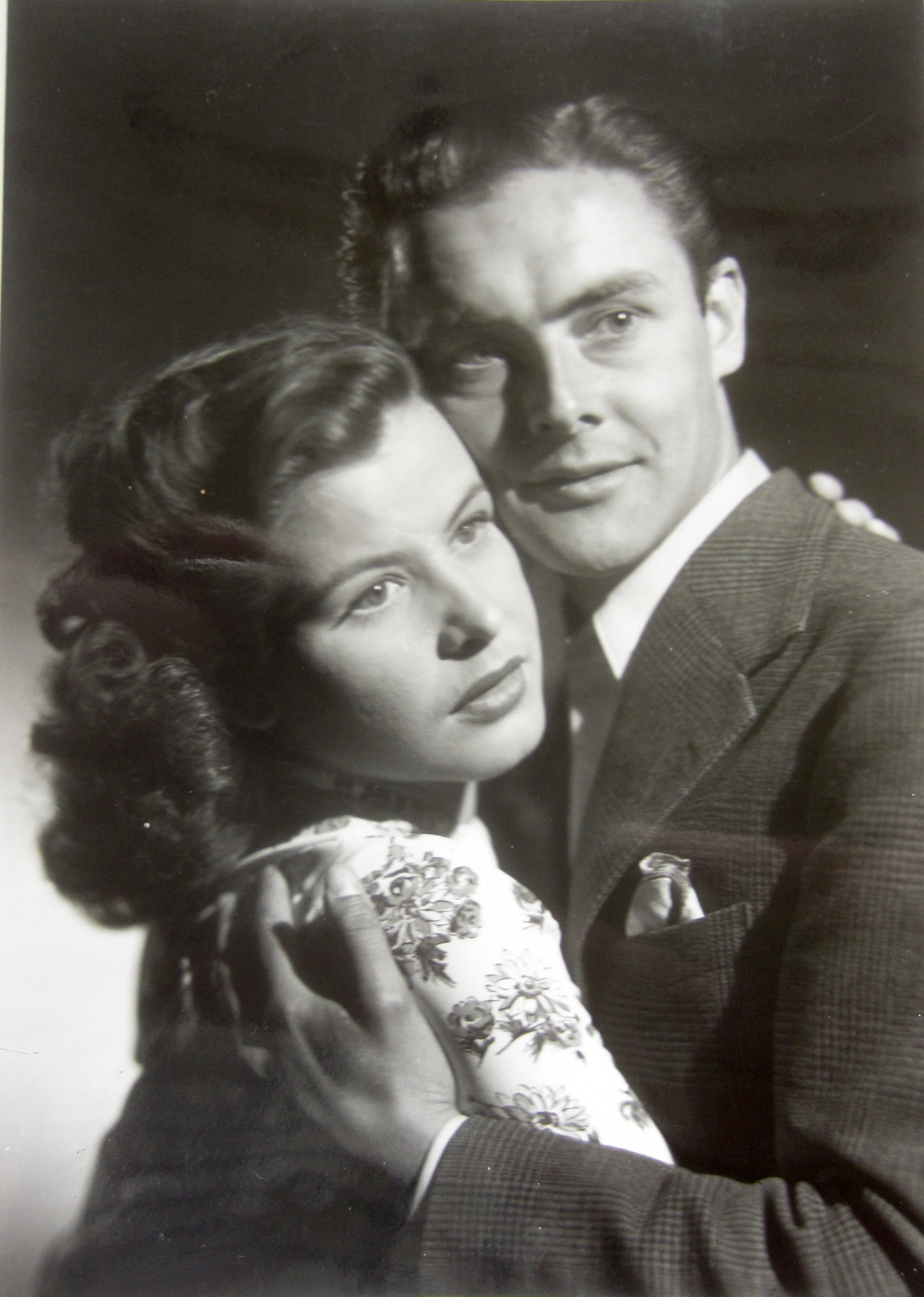
Maj-Britt Nilsson and Lars Nordrum in Resan bort. Photo by Louis Huch.

The Journey Away (Swedish: Resan bort) is a 1945 Swedish drama film directed by Alf Sjöberg and starring Gunn Wållgren, Holger Löwenadler and Maj-Britt Nilsson. It was shot at the Råsunda Studios in Stockholm and on location around Lysekil. The film's sets were designed by the art directors Nils Svenwall and Arne Åkermark.

== Cast ==
- Gunn Wållgren as Ellen Andersson
- Holger Löwenadler as Hjalmar Andersson
- Sture Lagerwall as Bernt
- Maj-Britt Nilsson as Eva
- Lars Nordrum as Ole
- Hjördis Petterson as Miss Wetterdahl
- Åke Claesson as Doctor Löfberg
- Carl Deurell as the Salvation Army officer
- Josua Bengtson as the train passenger
- Astrid Bodin as the woman cashier
- Nils Dahlgren as the bank manager
- Åke Engfeldt as the man in the bar
- David Erikson as a hotel guest
- Mona Geijer-Falkner as the cook
- Gösta Gustafson as the bank accountant
- Agda Helin as a hotel guest
- Jullan Kindahl as the nurse
- Segol Mann as the policeman
- Viveca Serlachius as the maid
- Georg Årlin as a hotel guest

== Bibliography ==
- Qvist, Per Olov & von Bagh, Peter. Guide to the Cinema of Sweden and Finland. Greenwood Publishing Group, 2000.
