= The Forests Sing Forever =

1959 film

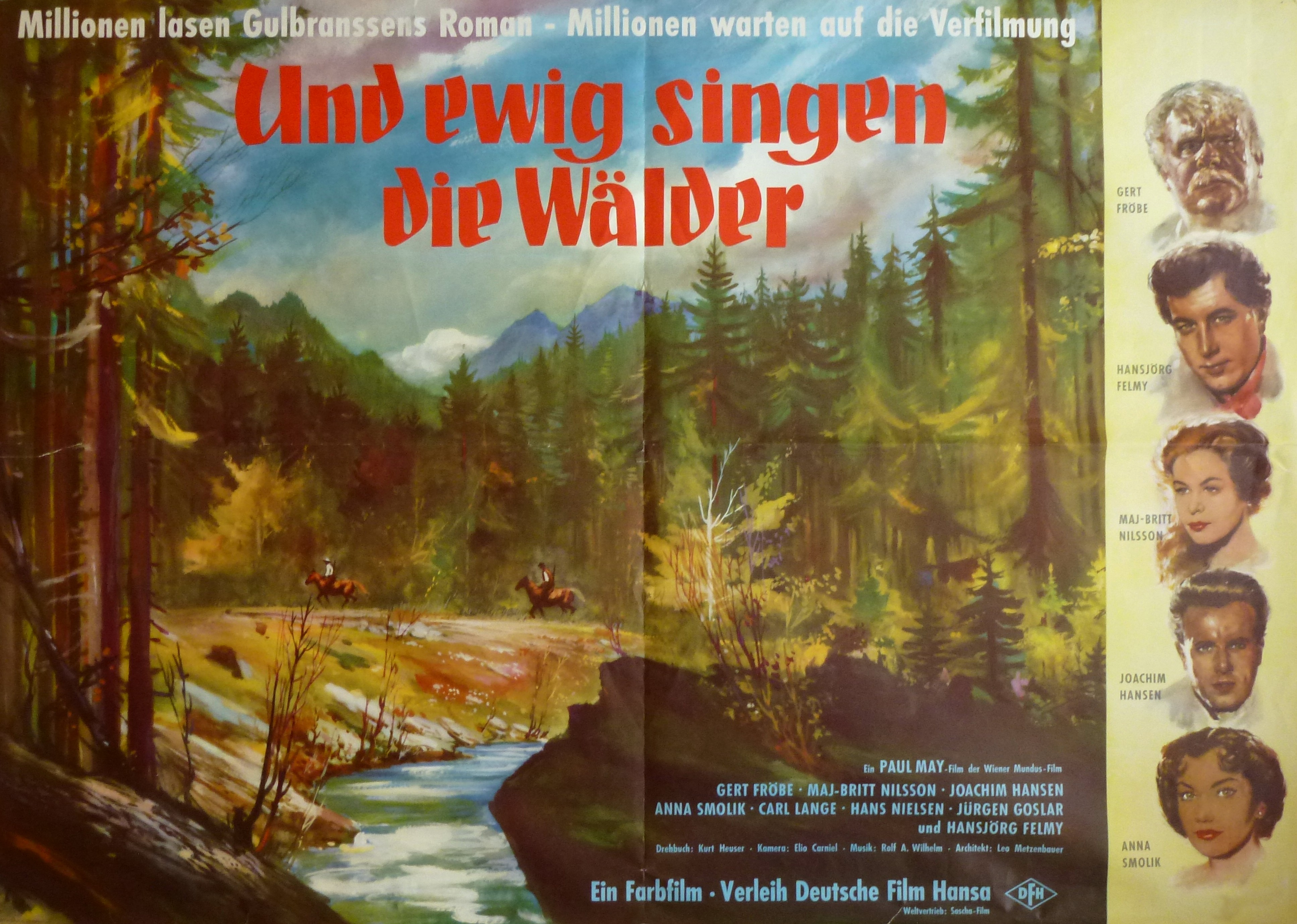
- Theatrical film poster
- German: Und ewig singen die Wälder
- Directed by: Paul May
- Written by: Trygve Gulbranssen (novel); Kurt Heuser
- Produced by: Heinz Pollak; Alfred Stöger
- Starring: Gert Fröbe; Hansjörg Felmy; Joachim Hansen
- Cinematography: Elio Carniel
- Edited by: Renate Jelinek
- Music by: Rolf A. Wilhelm
- Production company: Wiener Mundus-Film
- Distributed by: Deutsche Film Hansa
- Release date: 15 September 1959
- Running time: 105 minutes
- Country: Austria
- Language: German

The Forests Sing Forever (German: Und ewig singen die Wälder) is a 1959 Austrian drama film directed by Paul May and starring Gert Fröbe, Hansjörg Felmy and Joachim Hansen. It was followed by a 1960 sequel The Inheritance of Bjorndal.

The film's sets were designed by the art director Leo Metzenbauer, and it was filmed at the Bjølstad Farm.

== Cast ==
- Gert Fröbe as Dag sen.
- Hansjörg Felmy as Tore
- Joachim Hansen as young Dag
- Carl Lange as Mr. von Gall
- Anna Smolik as Elisabeth von Gall
- Hans Nielsen as Major Barre
- Maj-Britt Nilsson as Adelheid
- Elisabeth Epp as Jungfer Kruse
- Jürgen Goslar as Lt. Margas
- Hanns Ernst Jäger as Der Hoveländer
- Hilde Schreiber as Seine Tochter Borghild
- Fritz Hinz-Fabricius as Pfarrer Ramer
- Franz Schafheitlin as Kaufmann Holder - Schwager des alten Dag
- Peter Schmidberger as Jörn Vielfalt of Björndal
