= Summer Interlude =

1951 film by Ingmar Bergman

- Theatrical release poster
- Directed by: Ingmar Bergman
- Screenplay by: Ingmar Bergman; Herbert Grevenius
- Based on: "Mari" by Ingmar Bergman
- Produced by: Allan Ekelund
- Starring: Maj-Britt Nilsson; Birger Malmsten
- Cinematography: Gunnar Fischer
- Edited by: Oscar Rosander
- Music by: Erik Nordgren
- Distributed by: Svensk Filmindustri
- Release date: 1 October 1951
- Running time: 96 minutes
- Country: Sweden
- Language: Swedish
- Budget: SEK 434,000

Summer Interlude (Swedish: Sommarlek), originally titled Illicit Interlude in the United States, is a 1951 Swedish drama film co-written and directed by Ingmar Bergman. The film opened to highly positive reviews from critics.

== Plot ==
Marie (Nilsson) is a successful but emotionally distant prima ballerina in her late twenties. During a problem-filled dress rehearsal day for a production of the ballet Swan Lake she is unexpectedly sent the diary of her first love, Henrik (Malmsten), a college boy whom she met and fell in love with while visiting her Aunt Elizabeth and Uncle Erland's house on a summer vacation thirteen years ago. With the cancellation of the dress rehearsal until the evening, Marie takes a boat across to the island where she met Henrik and remembers their playful and carefree relationship.

Three days before the end of that summer 13 years prior, when Henrik is to return to college and Marie to the theatre, Henrik is severely injured after diving from a cliff face and dies. Her Uncle Erland, not actually her relation but a friend and admirer of Marie's mother and now similarly smitten with Marie, takes her away for the winter and helps her to "put up a wall" to lessen the pain of losing her lover and effectively closes her off emotionally. While visiting Erland's house she discovers that it was he who sent the diary to her at the theatre; he has had it ever since the day at the hospital when Henrik died from his injuries. She expresses regret and disgust that she ever allowed Erland to touch her, suggesting that he took advantage of her grief and they had an affair following Henrik's death.

Following the evening dress rehearsal, Marie talks with the ballet master, who recognises her single-minded devotion to her dancing and understands her problems, and then to her current lover, a journalist called David, with whom she seems to be in the process of breaking up. Marie decides to let David read Henrik's diary and then open up to him about her past experiences in order to explain her conflicted feelings and emotional coldness. After he has left, she removes her make up and as she does so regains some of her lost youth and innocence, smiling again and pulling faces in the mirror. The film concludes during the successful first performance of the ballet where Marie meets in the wings David, who is now more understanding of Marie's past. She happily kisses him and returns to the stage to finish the ballet.

== Cast ==
- Maj-Britt Nilsson as Marie
- Birger Malmsten as Henrik
- Alf Kjellin as David Nyström
- Annalisa Ericson as Kaj, Ballet Dancer
- Georg Funkquist as Uncle Erland
- Stig Olin as Ballet Master
- Mimi Pollak as Mrs. Calwagen, Henrik's aunt
- Renée Björling as Aunt Elisabeth
- Gunnar Olsson as The Priest

== Production ==
The film was shot between 3 April and 18 June 1950 with Dalarö as a primary location. The animated sequence was made by Rune Andréasson, who would later become well known in Sweden for the comics and cartoons with Bamse.

== Critical response ==
Summer Interlude received positive reviews by critics. A reviewer from Variety under the pen name 'Wing' wrote that the film "represents Swedish film-making at its best," noting the story "is much brighter than [Bergman] usually does," deviating from Bergman's style which was "usually filled with an influence of the hopelessness. He usually has the actors speaking words which hardly would pass any censorship. But here he tells a simple story in a wholesome way," adding that the film "probably will have no censor trouble and may find a big foreign market." The reviewer also praised Gunnar Fischer's cinematography and the performances by Maj-Britt Nilsson, Birger Malmsten, Alf Kjellinin and Mimi Pollak."

Stig Almqvist from Filmjournalen described the filmmaking method as "miraculous", writing that Bergman "belongs to a handful here and there in the world who are now discovering the future articulation of film, and the result can be revolutionary."

In July 1958, Jean-Luc Godard wrote in Cahiers du Cinéma, "There are five or six films in the history of the cinema which one wants to review simply by saying, 'It is the most beautiful of films.' Because there can be no higher praise... I love Summer Interlude." The film ranked 8th on Cahiers du Cinéma's Top 10 Films of the Year List in 1958.

Pauline Kael from The New Yorker wrote:

Bergman found his style in this film, and it is regarded by cinema historians not only as his breakthrough but also as the beginning of 'a new, great epoch in Swedish films.' Many of the themes (whatever one thinks of them) that Bergman later expanded are here: the artists who have lost their identities, the faces that have become masks, the mirrors that reflect death at work. But this movie, with its rapturous yet ruined love affair, also has a lighter side: an elegiac grace and sweetness.

David Parkinson from Radio Times rated the film 4 out of 5 stars, highlighting Maj-Britt Nilsson's performance and the cinematography. He wrote that it "established Ingmar Bergman's international reputation. Although it still deals with the theme of young love that dominated his earliest films, it contains the first inklings of the dramatic intensity and structural complexity that would characterise his more mature work."

Summer Interlude holds a rare 100% rating on Rotten Tomatoes, and an average score of 7.75/10, based on 11 critics.
