= Alfred Stöger =

Austrian film producer

- Born: 21 July 1900; Möllersdorf, Austro-Hungarian Empire
- Died: 12 January 1962 (aged 61); Vienna, Austria
- Occupations: Director, Producer
- Years active: 1935–1961 (film)

Alfred Stöger (21 July 1900 – 12 January 1962) was an Austrian film director and producer.

== Selected filmography ==
=== Producer ===
- Knall and Fall as Imposters (1952)
- On the Green Meadow (1953)
- Sarajevo (1955)
- The Schimeck Family (1957)
- The Forests Sing Forever (1959)
- The Inheritance of Bjorndal (1960)
- Kauf dir einen bunten Luftballon (1961)
- Three Men in a Boat (1961)

=== Director ===
- Another World (1937)
- Mistake of the Heart (1939)
- Dance Into Happiness (1951)
- Goetz von Berlichingen (1955)

== Bibliography ==
- Goble, Alan. The Complete Index to Literary Sources in Film. Walter de Gruyter, 1999.
