= Per Gerhard =

Swedish director and actor

- Born: Per Gerhard Johnson; 23 June 1924; Stockholm, Sweden
- Died: 28 December 2011 (aged 87); France
- Occupations: Theatre director; theatre manager; actor; writer
- Spouse: Maj-Britt Nilsson (m. 1951; died 2006)

Per Gerhard (born Per Gerhard Johnson; 23 June 1924 – 28 December 2011) was a Swedish theatre director, actor and during many years manager of the theater Vasateatern in Stockholm.

Gerhard, who was the son of successful revue writer Karl Gerhard and dancer Valborg Geyron, was director of Vasateatern between 1951 and 1985, and directed many successful plays, such as Spanska Flugan, Min fru går igen and Charleys Tant (Swedish titles for Die spanische Fliege, Blithe Spirit and Charley's Aunt, respectively). He married the actress Maj-Britt Nilsson in 1951, who appears in three Ingmar Bergman movies. She died in 2006.

He published his memoires, För öppen ridå ("In front of an open curtain" – an idiom about doing something publicly), in 1990, and a biography about his dad, Karl Gerhard – med kvickheten som vapen ("Karl Gerhard – with wits as a weapon"), in 2007.
