= Karl Gerhard =

Swedish theater director, revue writer and actor

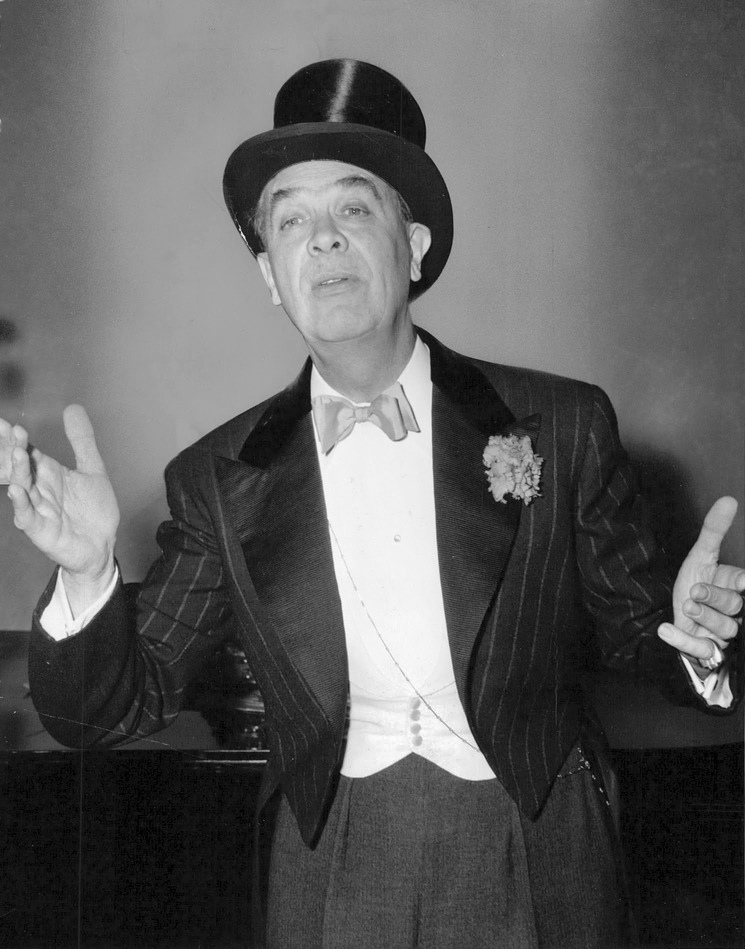
- Gerhard in 1951
- Born: Karl Emil Georg Johnson; 14 April 1891; Stockholm, Sweden
- Died: 24 April 1964 (aged 73); Saltsjöbaden, Sweden
- Occupations: Theater director, revue writer and actor
- Spouses: Mary Johnson (m. 1913; div. 1920) Valborg Geyron (m. 1922; div. 1930) Brita Werner (m. 1930; div. 1936)
- Children: Maj-Catrine (1914–1964); Per Gerhard (1924–2011); Fatima Svendsen (1944–)

Karl Emil Georg Gerhard (born Johnson; 14 April 1891 – 22 April 1964) was a Swedish actor, singer-songwriter, political satirist, and theatre director. A major figure and pioneer of Swedish entertainment, he was known for his witty, scholarly, and politically engaged couplets, often using mythological and historical references to criticize contemporary society, including Swedish government policies and the threat of Nazism during World War II.

== Biography ==
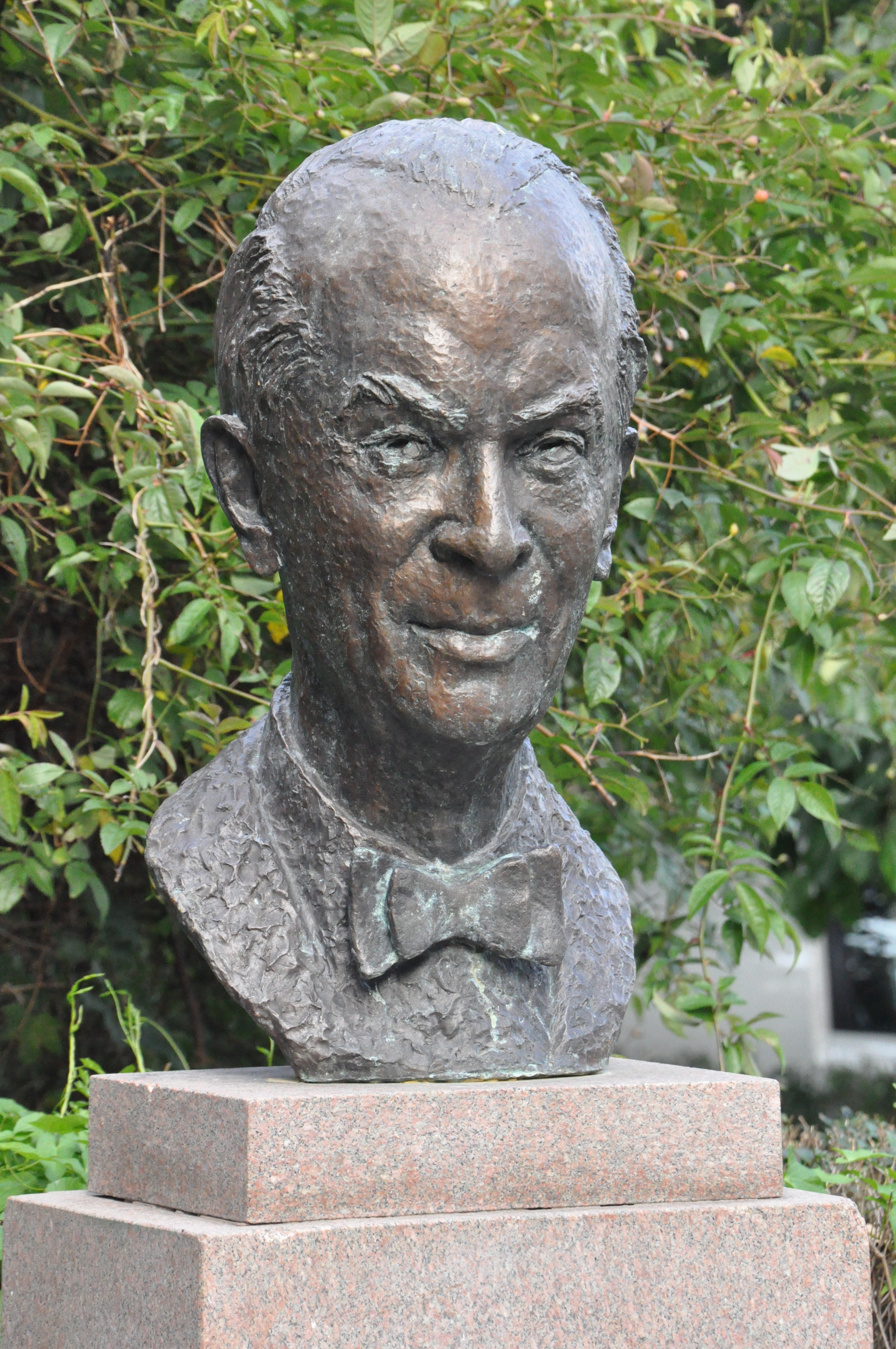
Bust of Karl Gerhard, Lorensberg Theatre, Gothenburg

Karl Emil Georg Johnson was born in Hedvig Eleonora parish in Stockholm, Sweden. He was the son of Frans Emil Jonsson (1861–1917) and Jenny Augusta Jonsdotter (1863–1906). In 1916, he appeared as an actor under the direction of Hjalmar Selander at the Nya Teatern in Gothenburg. In 1919, he debuted as a couplet singer at the cabaret Fenixpalatset in Stockholm as successor to Ernst Rolf (1891–1932). For many years, he was an actor in various traveling theater companies.

Through most of his career, he wrote songs and couplets as well as a large number of sketches, dialogues and monologues for performance on the stages of Stockholm and Gothenburg. Many of Karl Gerhard's plays and songs were politically to the left, and during the 1930s and World War II, they contained clear anti-fascist statements. He composed and sang a number of couplet text that sharply criticized the Swedish government's apathy towards Nazi Germany, among these Den ökända hästen från Troja (The Infamous Horse of Troy).

He together with the Wallenberg family and the Swedish government arranged a deal to export critical metal alloys to the Soviet Union during the war. The Soviets needed the alloys for their air force. The Wallenbergs tried to get Raoul Wallenberg released from Soviet incarceration while Karl Gerhart supported Soviet during the war. Wallenberg was not released by Soviet, he was reportedly killed by the Russians.

Gerhart was married three times: to actresses Mary Johnson (1913 to 1920), Valborg Geyron (1922 to 1930) and Brita Werner (1930 to 1936). He was the father of actor Per Gerhard (1924–2011).

== Selected filmography ==
- Mästerkatten i stövlar (1918)
- Say It with Music (1929)
- Prov utan värde (1930)
- Lucky Devils (1932)
- Äktenskapsleken (1935) (also script)
- We Three Debutantes (1953)
- The Jazz Boy (1958)
