= Walloon immigration to Sweden =

Diaspora of Walloons in Sweden

The history of Walloon immigration to Sweden begins with industrialists Guillaume de Bèche (Willem de Besche; 1573–1629) and Louis De Geer (1587–1652), known as "the father of the Swedish steel industry". Five to ten thousand Walloons emigrated to Sweden, mainly working in the steel industry. During the 1920s, trade unions presented them to Swedish workers as mythical models.

== History ==
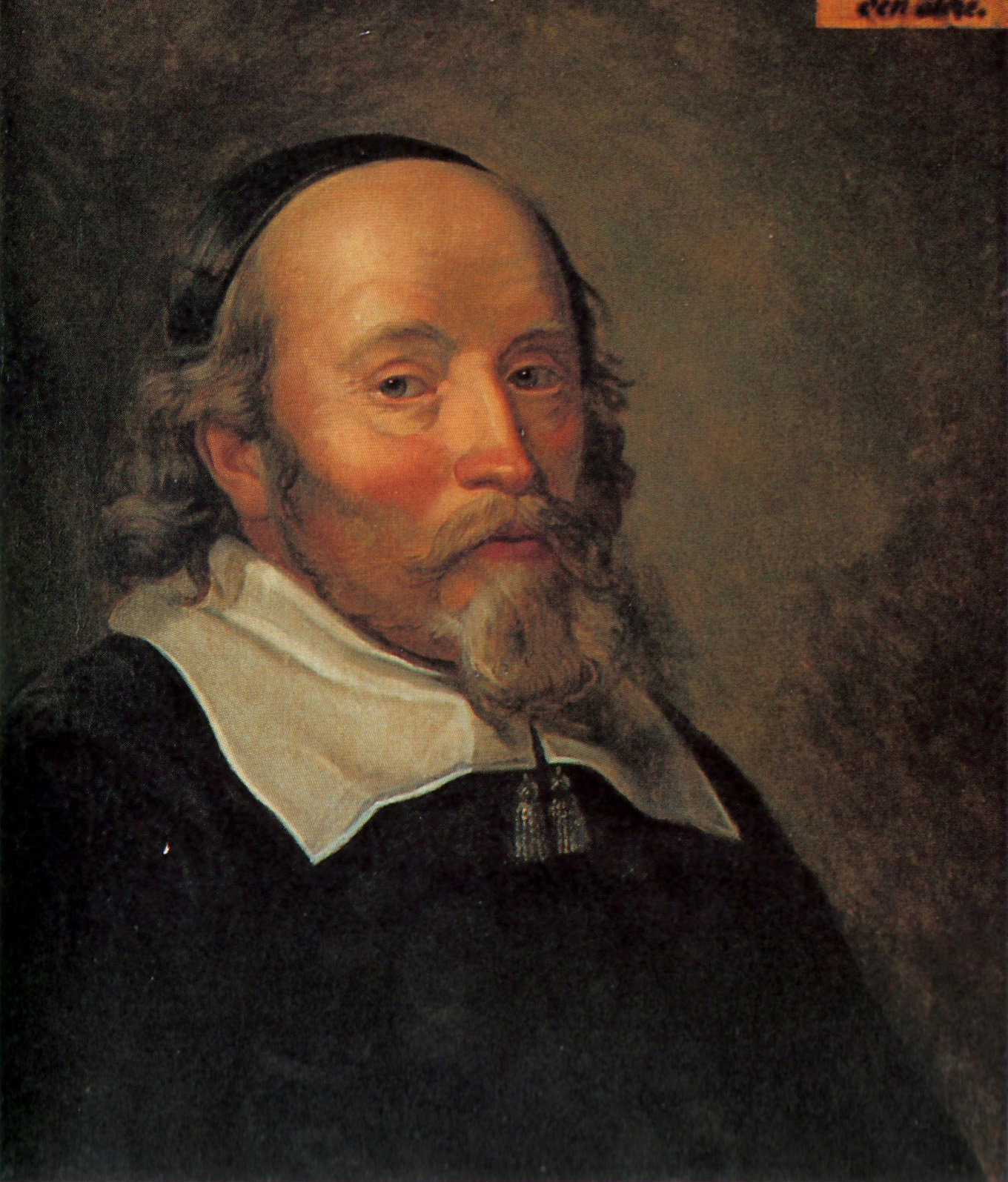
Louis De Geer by David Beck

During the 16th century, forging techniques were improved in the area around Liège (see Walloon forging), which had developed into the capital of European steel production. The Walloons' reputation for steel production became widespread, and was also noted in Sweden. Encouraged by Gustav II Adolf, many Walloons began to emigrate to Sweden during the late 16th and early 17th centuries. They came from two main areas located around the cities of Sedan and Liège. At first, most of the Walloons settled in Godegård, Finspång and Norrköping, where the Walloon entrepreneur Louis De Geer was able to lease land. Although it was traditionally explained, and it is often assumed, that the Walloons and De Geer fled from their homeland due to religious persecution, nowadays it has been established that the Walloons fled from economic pressures due to widespread unemployment.

In Sweden, De Geer met Willem de Besche, with whom he had already had contacts, and who managed the Finspång ironworks until 1618. De Besche, who was also from Liège, had been active in Sweden since 1595, and had participated in the modernization of the Swedish royal ironworks and, especially, in arms production. He is noted for having introduced new ironwork techniques in Sweden, but was not an independent entrepreneur as De Geer, being rather an employee of the king. De Besche was the first to recruit Walloons to Sweden. He settled in Nykoping in 1597, and thanks to his enlisting of Walloons, a Walloon community was established in Södermanland during the years after his arrival. After acting as De Besche's guarantor in 1618 when he leased the Finspång manufacturing plant, from the beginning of the 1620s De Geer completely took over the business of the mill in Finspång. Recruitment took place in such a way that agents were sent out to the smaller mills to recruit the desired professional directly on the spot. But just as often, unemployed Walloons came to the larger towns to seek employment in Sweden at the recruitment offices established there. De Besche was initially responsible for recruiting workforce via De Geer. Since the 1620s, it became the sole responsibility of De Geer, who dispatched his agents from his offices in Liège, Namur, Chimay and Verviers. They would then go about picking the qualified personnel from among the unemployed Walloons.

It appears that the cooperation between De Geer and De Besche ceased in the early 17th century, with the latter later working on his own iron mill in Forsmark, Uppland.

The emigration of the Walloons raised serious concerns with King Philip IV of Spain (to whom Belgium belonged during the early 17th century). In 1624, subject to severe penalty, he forbade Wallonia's blacksmiths to enlist in Sweden and "introduce the art of blacksmithing there, to much damage and harm to Us and Our country, as well as to great self harm to themselves". However, this did not significantly affect migration and the ban was circumvented in many different ways, through the use of disguises and sneak routes.

At the end of the 1620s, Louis De Geer got engaged in Sweden's iron industry in the Östergötland, rich in ore. He contracted out the Finspång and Dannemora plants in De Besche's name, becoming their owner in 1641 and 1643, respectively. In the years 1643–1650 the immigration of Walloons to Sweden reached its climax. De Geer expanded the industry of Finspång to a degree that had never been seen in Sweden before. Despite De Geer receiving a promise from Gustav II Adolf that other mill owners would not be allowed to use Walloons as labor, the Walloons began to take employment at other mills in Central Sweden. Along with the blacksmiths, other professional groups also came.

From 1620, between 5,000 and 10,000 Walloons emigrated to Sweden for economic and religious reasons. The Swedes were amazed by their technical know-how, which helped them make great progress in the steel industry. Between 1620 and 1650, Swedish steel exports trebled, reaching 17,500 tons a year, in particular for the English navy. The Walloons’ lifestyle was also ahead of Sweden's, particularly with regard to hygiene. They remained separate from the Swedish population for a long time, jealously keeping their technical secrets until the end of the 18th century. The Walloons caused a revolution in the Swedish metal industry, laying the foundation "for the fact that the Swedish metallurgical industry today enjoys world-wide reputation."

== Legacy and recognition ==
Walloon immigrants were behind Swedish metallurgy from the 17th century onwards and the Walloon language remained spoken in some areas until at least 1769, while some terms relating to blacksmithing survived well into the 19th century. The impact of Walloon immigration in Sweden was lasting, coming to be embodied in the myth of the Walloon trade-union hero, which corresponds neither to the historic reality of the 17th and 18th centuries nor to the reality of the 1920s in Sweden. The idealized Walloon did not represent a foreign at all, but rather was perceived as genuinely Swedish. Starting from the early 20th century, being of Walloon descent has become almost "as good as being noble". Walloon ancestry also became a way to explain tanned skin or dark hair found in Swedes. The Walloons are seen as the first modern Swedes, and are a "sought-after object of identification". The societies built by the Walloons can be considered a precursor of Swedish welfare system.

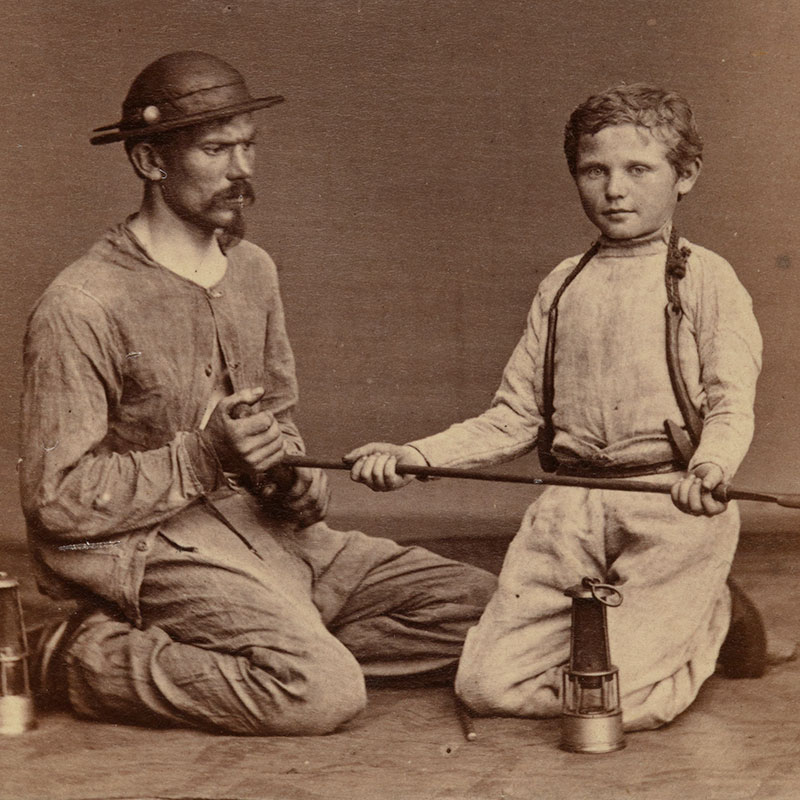
Walloon man and child at Walloon forge in Sweden

Around 1920, at a time when the Walloon identity was fading, the newspaper of the Swedish metalworkers union gave birth to the myth of the Walloon worker, who was both strong and endowed with a deep class consciousness transposed into the past. This newspaper, Metallarbetaren, printed these surprising lines (June 3, 1922):

Walloons are stronger than the Flemings (the Dutch-speaking inhabitants of Belgium), thinner, more nervous, healthier, and they live longer. Their skill and their professionalism are superior to those of the Flemish. They exceed the French in tenacity and enthusiasm - qualities which favoured their immigration in Sweden. But their passionate rashness makes them look like the French people.

Thus was invented the myth of the Walloon capable of trade-union action, in particular by strike, presented as a model to the Swedes. Anders Florén and Math Isacson, in De fer et de feu, l’émigration wallonne vers la Suède (2003), write: "there doubtless existed, in these difficult times of crisis, a strong need for models, and Walloons offered an ideal embodiment of the values which the labor union of the metallurgists intended to promote."

== Modern descendants ==
Many of today's Swedish families are descended from the Walloons. Although many Walloon surnames disappeared, being dropped for Swedish patronymics and Swedish surnames, a few have survived to the present day and are still used. These include: Anjou, de Besche, Birath, Boivie or Befwe, Bouveng, Couchois or Cochois, De Geer, Drougge, Galon, Garneji, Gauffin, Gävert, Gefvert or Giifvert, Gille or Gillet, Gilljam, Hybinette, Laurin, Lemon or Lemoine, Pira, Pousette and Sporrong.

The number of Walloon descendants in Sweden has been estimated at around 100,000 in the past, which today is believed to be an underestimate. Anders Herou, chairman of the Society of Walloon Descendants (Swedish: Sällskapet Vallonättlingar), does not believe that the number exceeds one million, but amounts to a few hundred thousand.

== Gallery ==
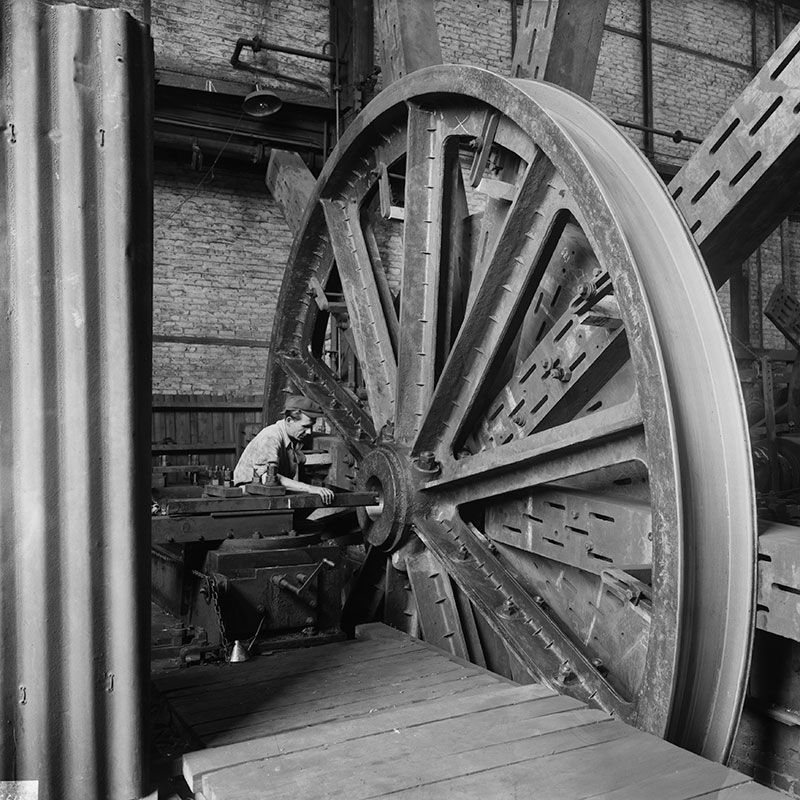
Walloon forge in Sweden

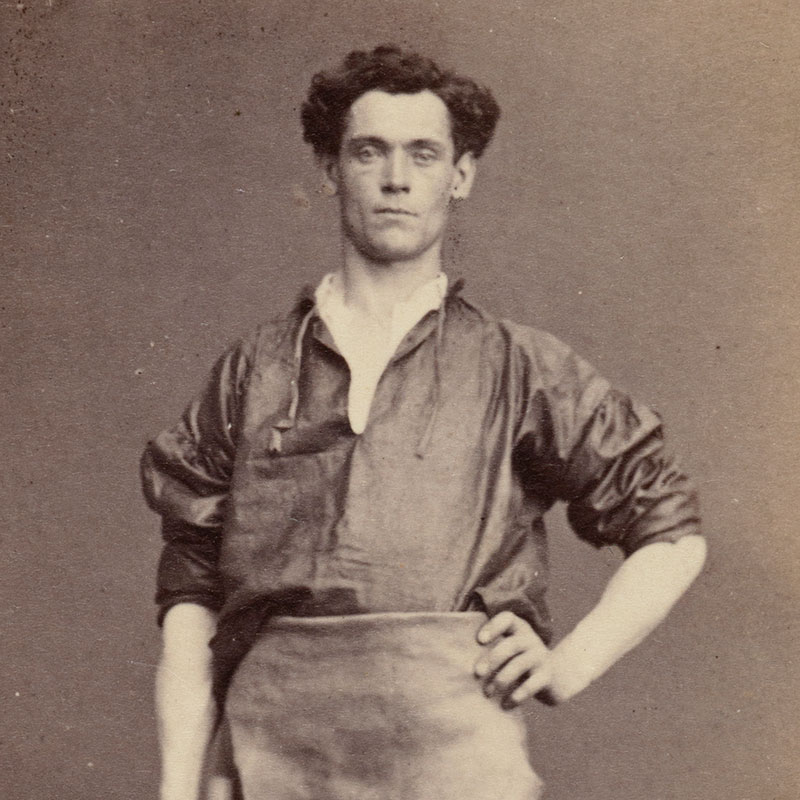
Young Swedish Walloon man

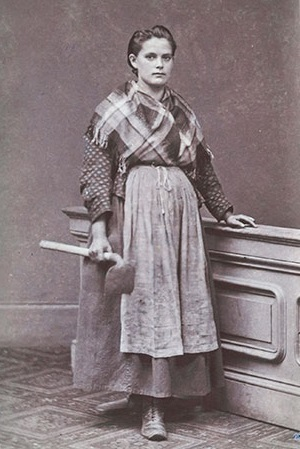
Swedish Walloon woman

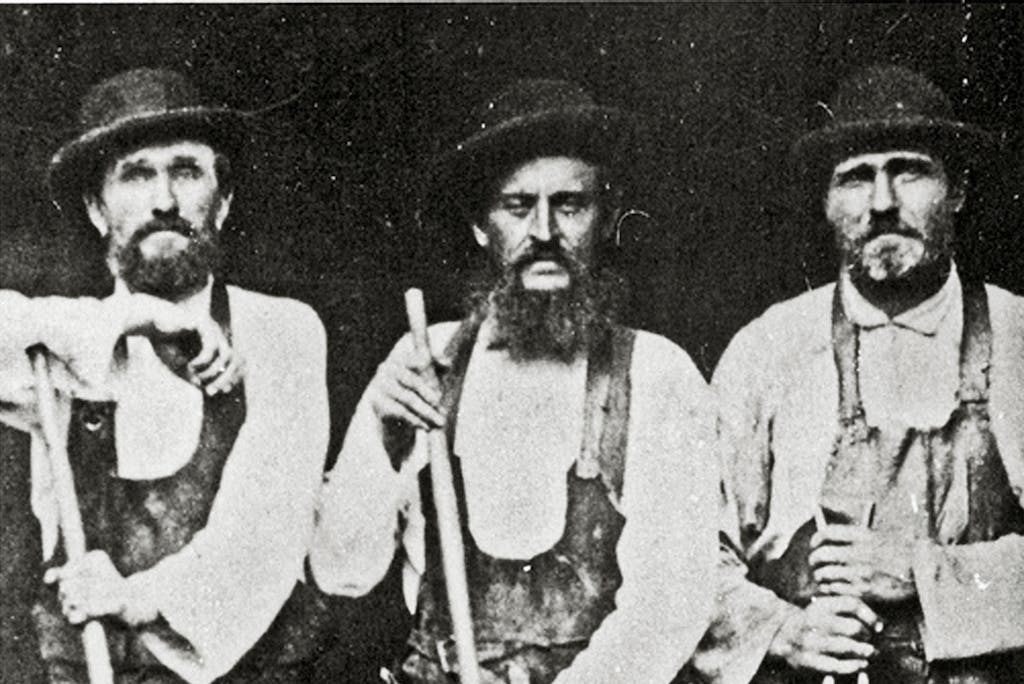
Walloon hammersmiths at Lövsta bruk in the early 1870s

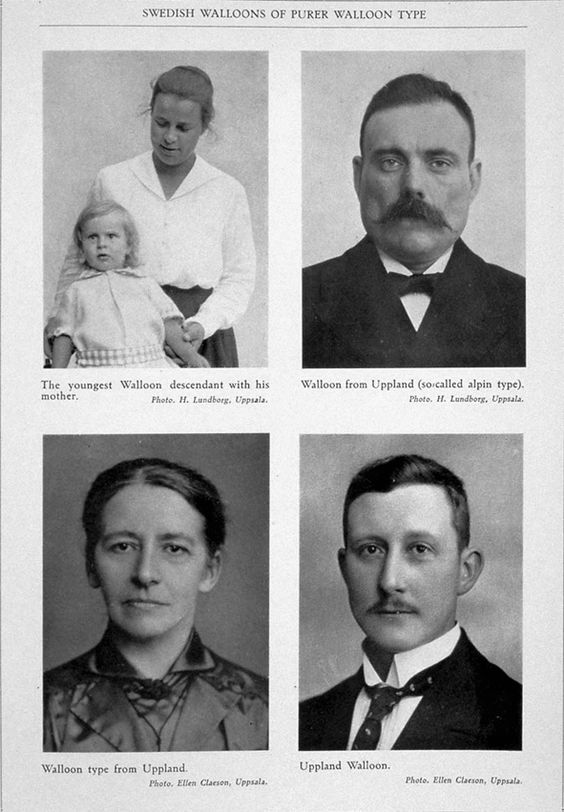
Walloons from Sweden from the 1921 The Swedish Nation in Word and Picture

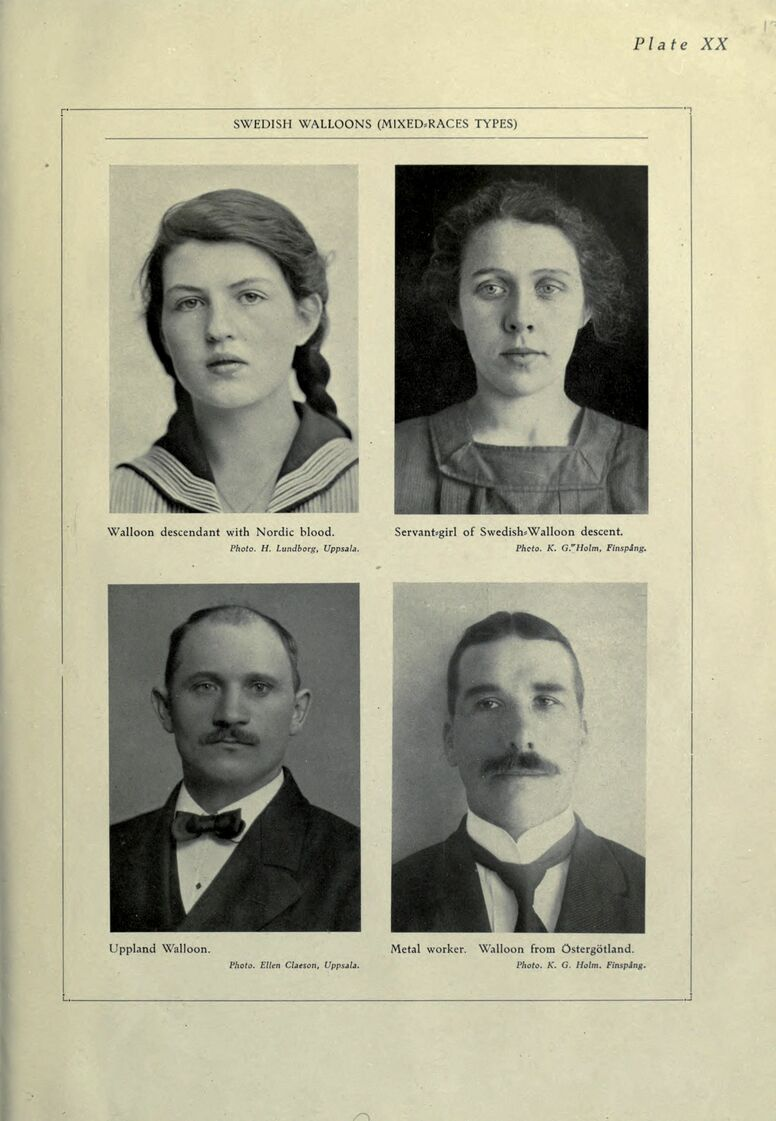
Mixed Swedish-Walloons from the 1921 The Swedish Nation in Word and Picture

== Notable people ==
The following is a list of notable Swedes of Walloon descent:

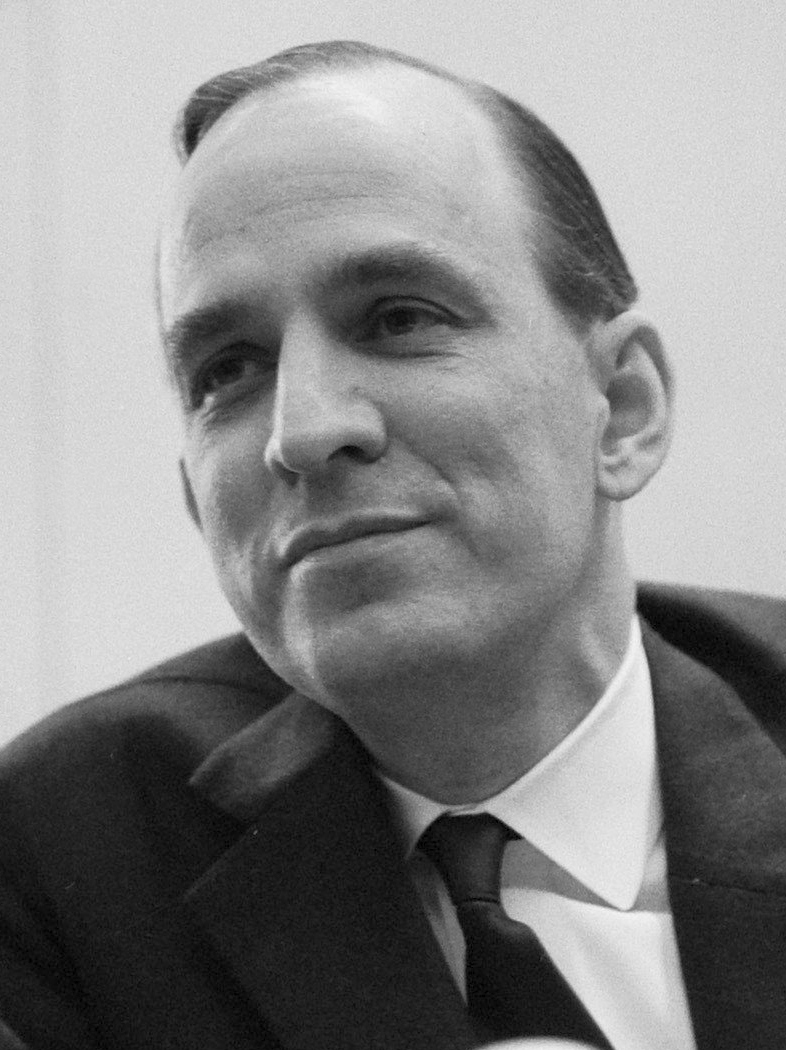
Ingmar Bergman

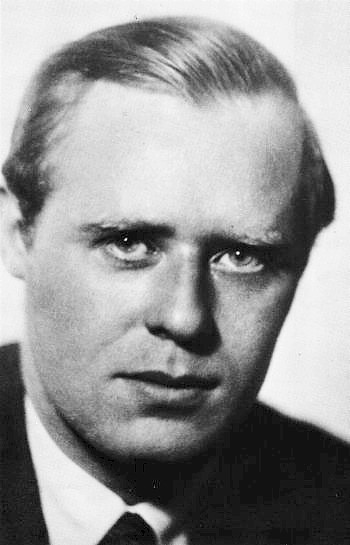
Gunnar de Frumerie

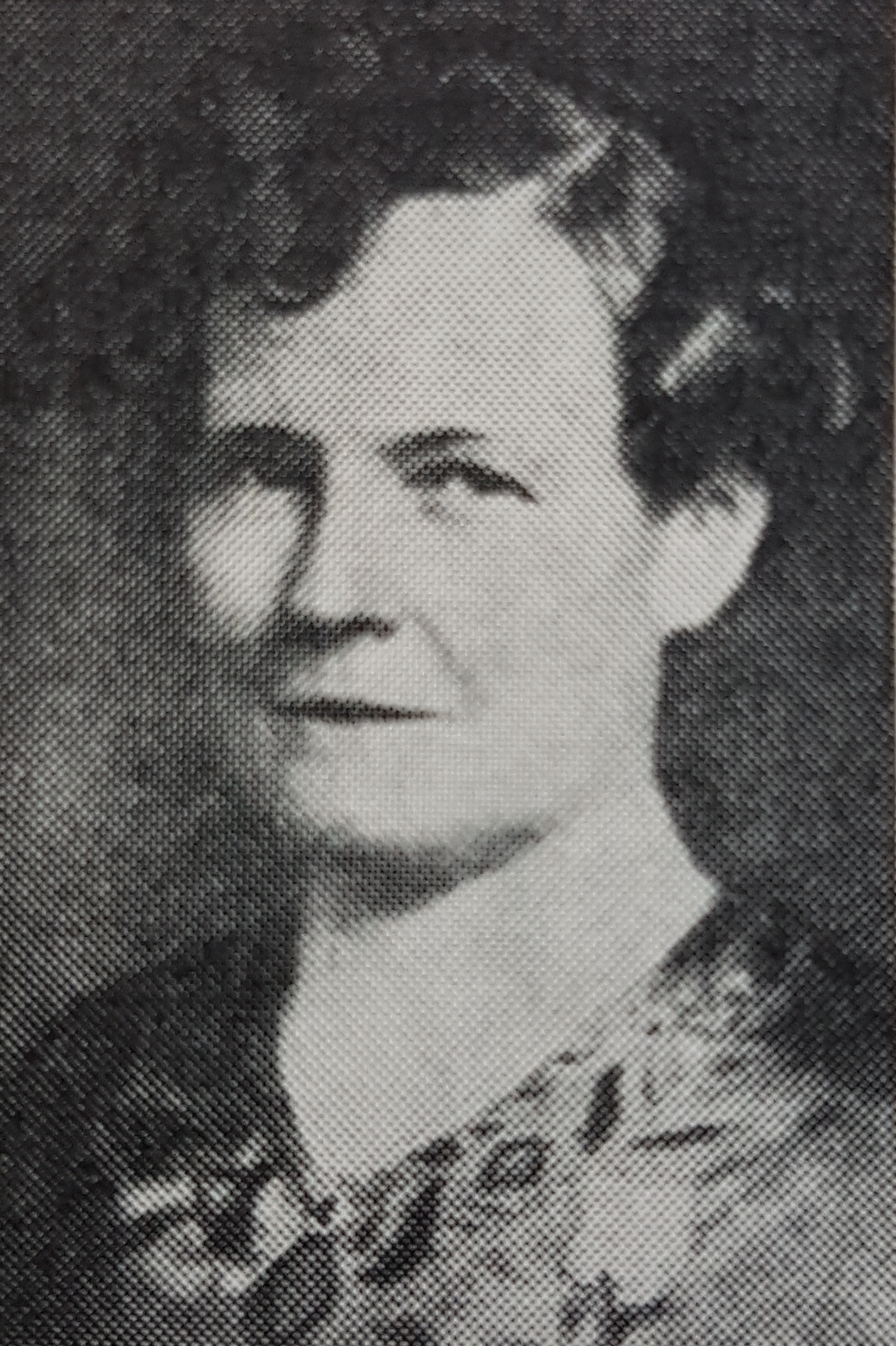
Ida Matton

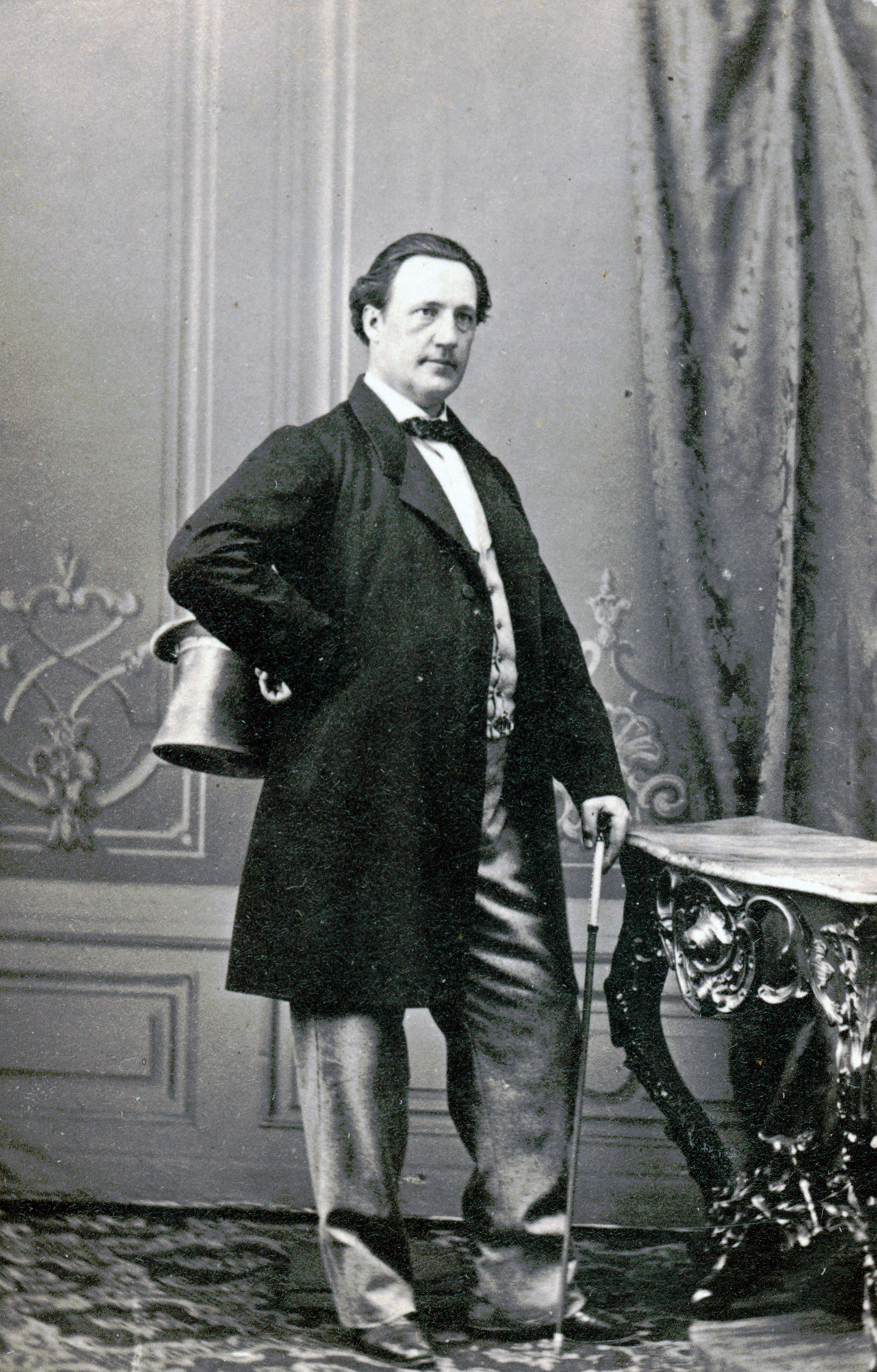
Mauritz Pousette

Anders de Wahl

- Henry Allard, politician (1911–1996)
- Lars Anton Anjou, bishop, church historian, politician (1803–1884)
- Alice Babs, singer and actress (1924–2014)
- Emil Befwe, architect (1860–1939)
- Daniel Bergman, film director (born 1962)
- Ingmar Bergman, filmmaker (1918–2007) (Note: Bergman's mother was partly of Walloon descent)
- Gustaf Boivie, sport shooter (1864–1951)
- Hedvig Boivie, musician and musicologist (1864–1923)
- Margareta Bergström-Kärde, opera singer (1919–2006)
- Björn Borg, tennis player (born 1956)
- Johan Anton Bovin, jurist (1823–1894)
- Karl Emil Bovin, physician (1868–1962)
- Knut Adolf Bovin, gardener (1853–1926)
- Willem Boy (Guillaume Boyen), painter, sculptor, architect (1520–1592)
- Ida Drougge, politician (born 1990)
- Hans Fleming, architect (1545–1623)
- Agnes de Frumerie, artist (1869–1937)
- David Frumerie, painter (1641–1677)
- Gunnar de Frumerie, composer and pianist (1908–1987)
- Gustaf de Frumerie, architect (1872–1947)
- Mauritz Frumerie, engraver (1775–1853)
- Axel Gauffin, art historian (1877–1964)
- Gerhard Louis De Geer, politician, prime minister of Sweden (1854–1935)
- Louis Gerhard De Geer, politician, first prime minister of Sweden (1818–1896)
- Charles De Geer, industrialist and entomologist (1720–1778)
- Charlotta Aurora De Geer, salonist and courtier (1779–1834)
- Gustaf Gilljam, schoolman and politician, Minister for Education (1832–1908)
- Peter Englund, author and historian (born 1957)
- Adam Gilljam, professional bandy player (born 1990)
- Hélène Goudin, politician (born 1956)
- Dag Hammarskjöld, economist (1905–1961)
- Hjalmar Hammarskjöld, politician, scholar, prime minister of Sweden (1862–1953)
- Josef Herou, operatic baritone (1884–1960)
- Viktor Herou, politician (1889–1970)
- Samuel Hybbinette, physician (1876–1939)
- Victor Hybbinette, industrialist and metallurgist (1867–1939)
- Benjamin Ingrosso, singer (born 1997)
- Peter Jihde, television host and sports reporter (born 1971)
- Karl Kilbom, politician (1885–1961)
- Zara Larsson, singer (born 1997)
- Rebecka Le Moine, politician (born 1990)
- Benna Lemon-Brundin, opera singer (1912–1995)
- Gurli Lemon-Bernhard, opera and operetta singer (1916–2011)
- Olof Lemon, opera singer (1866–1934)
- Stefan Löfven, politician, prime minister of Sweden (born 1957)
- Ulf Lundell, singer and songwriter (born 1949)
- Olof Lundh, sports journalist (born 1966)
- Ida Matton, sculptor (1863–1940)
- Lennart Nilsson, photographer (1922–2017)
- Anne Sofie von Otter, mezzo-soprano (born 1955)
- Mikael Persbrandt, actor (born 1963)
- Leif G. W. Persson, criminologist and novelist (born 1945)
- Nils Personne, Swedish Air Force officer (1918–2013)
- Åke Pousette, physician and professor (born 1949)
- Harald Pousette, diplomat (1886–1975)
- Ingemar Pousette, mining engineer (1926–2000)
- Madeleine Pousette, journalist (born 1943)
- Mauritz Pousette, actor (1824–1883)
- Tage Pousette, diplomat (1921–2012)
- Tomas Pousette, economist (born 1950)
- Alex Schulman, author, journalist and radio personality (born 1976)
- Ulf Stark, author and screenwriter (1944–2017)
- Nina Stemme, dramatic soprano (born 1963)
- Anders de Wahl, actor (1869–1956)
- Oscar de Wahl, composer and arranger (1832–1873)
- Pernilla Wahlgren, singer (born 1967)

== Sources ==
- Stanislas Bormans, "Les Wallons en Suède", Bulletin de l'Institut archéologique liégeois, vol. XXI, 1888, pp. 127–135 (online)
- Luc Courtois and Jean Pirotte (eds.), De fer et de feu, l’émigration wallonne vers la Suède, Fondation wallonne, Louvain, 2003.
- L. Courtois and C. Sappia (eds.), De Fer et de feu. L'émigration wallonne vers la Suède. Histoire et mémoire (XVIIe-XXIe siècles). Exhibition in the Walloon Parliament, Namur, 19-29 Feb. 2008 (Publications de la Fondation Wallonne P.-M. et J.-F. Humblet. Série Études et documents, vol. V), Louvain-la-Neuve, 2008.
- E.M. Braekman, Le protestantisme belge au XVIIème siècle, Collection Terres Protestantes, Éditions La Cause, Carrières-sous-Poissy, 2001.
