= Frumerie =

Swedish family

Frumerie is a Swedish family. The family descends from Martin Frumerie, who came to Sweden with Louis de Geer in 1635. The family originates in southern Belgium, in the province of Hainaut.

Martin's name was also spelled as Framerie, de Framerie, de la Framerie, Delaframerie and Fremery. He signed a contract with Louis de Geer on 19 July 1635, to become the school teacher and reformed preacher of Finspång forge. Since he signed the contract as Frumerie, this is considered the correct form of the name by the Swedish branch of the family. They sailed to Sweden from Leiden. Martin's son David Frumerie (1641–1677) was a painter and gilder working at Drottningholm Palace. One of David's brothers, Josua Frumerie (1637–1712), was the father of Caleb Frumerie (1670–1738), colonel and chief of the Kalmar Regiment who followed Charles XII to Bender and Poltava before being knighted as de Frumerie in 1718.

The brother of David and Josua Frumerie, Jean (Johan) Frumerie (1634–89), was bailiff in Nora fögderi (Örebro county) from 1668 to 1676. In 1681 he became mayor of Nora. He represented Nora at the Riksdag. By 1675 he owned most of Vedevågs forge in Linde (Ör). He married Sara Pemer, and two sons of theirs reached adulthood and had families, Per Frumerie (1662–1713) and Johan (1663–1709).

Per became a district attorney in Örebro County. Per was the grandfather of a younger Per Frumerie (1717–1777), two sons of whom reaching adulthood and raising families, half brothers Adolf Fredrik (1749–1803) and Carl Gustaf (1774–1859). Two great-grandsons of Adolf Fredrik emigrated to the US in the 1870s/1880s, starting American branches, one of which came to live in Canada. Carl Gustaf fathered sea captain Gustaf de Frumerie (1849–1936), whose wife was sculptor Agnes de Frumerie.

The grandfather born in 1717 and the grandson dying in 1936 is a timespan of 219 years (and four days). So far, this is the longest known such span of three generations in Sweden. It could be compared to the better known case of the 10th US President John Tyler, who was born on March 29, 1790, and whose last living grandson Harrison Ruffin Tyler passed on May 25, 2025 – 235 years, 1 month and 29 days.

Johan (1663–1709, see above) was mountain bailiff in Nora bergslag. He was the father of Johan Frumerie (died 1756), secretary of the Admiralty in Karlskrona. Johan was the grandfather of engraver and lithographer Mauritz Frumerie.

The latter Johan's brother, lieutenant Per Frumerie (1697–1767) was the great-grandfather of architect Gustaf de Frumerie. Gustaf was the father of, among others, pianist and piano educator Ragnhild Maria de Frumerie (1907–1988), composer and pianist Gunnar de Frumerie, and cellist Carin de Frumerie-Luthander.

The name Frumerie was also adopted by the children of a niece of Gustaf's father, among whom was opera singer and painter Ossian Frumerie.

== Prominent members of the family ==
- David Frumerie (1641–1677), painter
- Mauritz Frumerie (1775–1853), engraver and lithographer
- Agnes de Frumerie, née Kjellberg (1869–1937), sculptor
- Gustaf de Frumerie (1872–1947), architect
- Gunnar de Frumerie (1908–1987), composer and pianist

== Prominent people related to the family ==
- Anne Sofie von Otter (born 1955), mezzo-soprano
- Nina Stemme (born 1963), dramatic soprano
