= Bovin =

Bovin is a surname. In Russia, it is given to males, while its feminine counterpart is Bovina. Bovin is also an unrelated Swedish surname of Walloon origin that has several variants. The surname may refer to

- Alexander Bovin (1930–2004), Soviet and Russian journalist, political scientist and diplomat
- Birthe Bovin (1906–1980), Danish painter
- Doug Bovin (born 1944), American politician
- Elena Bovina (born 1983), Russian tennis player
- Johan Anton Bovin (1823–1894), jurist and member of the Swedish parliament
- Karl Bovin (1907–1985), Danish painter, husband of Birthe
- Karl Emil Bovin (1868–1962), Swedish physician
- Knut Adolf Bovin (1853–1926), landscape architect, landscape gardener, publicist and writer
- Oleg Bovin (born 1946), Russian water polo player
