= Bouveng =

Bouveng is a Swedish surname, a form of Walloon Bovin. Notable people with the surname include:

- David Bouveng (born 1973), Australian rugby league player
- Helena Bouveng (born 1962), Swedish politician
- Josefin Bouveng (born 2001), Swedish ice hockey player
- Victor Bouveng (born 1996), Swedish racing driver

== See also ==
- Bovin
- Bouvin
- Bowin (surname)
- Boväng
