= Laci Boldemann =

Swedish composer

- Born: April 24, 1921
- Died: August 18, 1969 (aged 48)
- Occupation: composer

Laci Boldemann (24 April 1921 – 18 August 1969) was a Swedish composer of German and Finnish descent.

== Life and career ==
Boldemann was born in Helsinki. He studied at the Royal Academy of Music in London from 1937 to 1939, both conducting (with Henry Wood) and piano, where he continued his studies in Stockholm at the outbreak of war in 1939 with Gunnar de Frumerie.

In 1941 his citizenship forced Boldemann to join the German army and fight in the Soviet Union, Poland and Italy; he was later imprisoned in the US and returned to Sweden via France and Germany. After returning to Sweden in 1947, he joined the Swedish Composers’ Society and served as Secretary and Treasurer (1963—1969). He was also on the board of the Swedish Performing Rights Society and the Joint Council of Artists and Writers. He died in Munich.

The stimulation of literature played an important part in Boldemann's work. Music drama, art songs and fun songs for children, as well as vocal works with an orchestral accompaniment, were genres in which he composed.

His instrumental work is characterised by both lyrical freshness and percussive propulsion, in a traditional rather than avant garde style.

== Compositions ==
=== Orchestral music ===
- Symphony (1959–61)
- La Danza, Symphonic overture (1949)
- Sinfonietta for strings (1954)

=== Concert works ===
- Piano Concerto (1956)
- Violin Concerto (1959)

=== Chamber music ===
- String Quartet (1957)

=== Instrumental ===
- Little suite on nursery rhymes for piano (1961)
- Small ironic pieces for piano op. 19 (1942–45)

=== Vocal ===
- Lieder der Vergänglichkeit, cantata for baritone and strings (1951)
- Four epitaphs for soprano and strings (1952)
- Notturno for soprano and orchestra (1958)

=== Songs ===
- 50 songs, including the nursery rhymes Mice in moonlight (1961)

=== Works for the stage ===
- Opera Svart är vitt(Black is white-said the emperor), 1965

=== Recording ===
- Laci Boldemann, Swedish Society Discofil, 1988. (Stockholm Philharmonic Orchestra, Dag Achatz(fp.), Solveig Faringer(sop.), Naohiro Totsuka(cond.) )
