= Bladåker Church =

Coordinates: 60°00′00″N 18°15′27″E

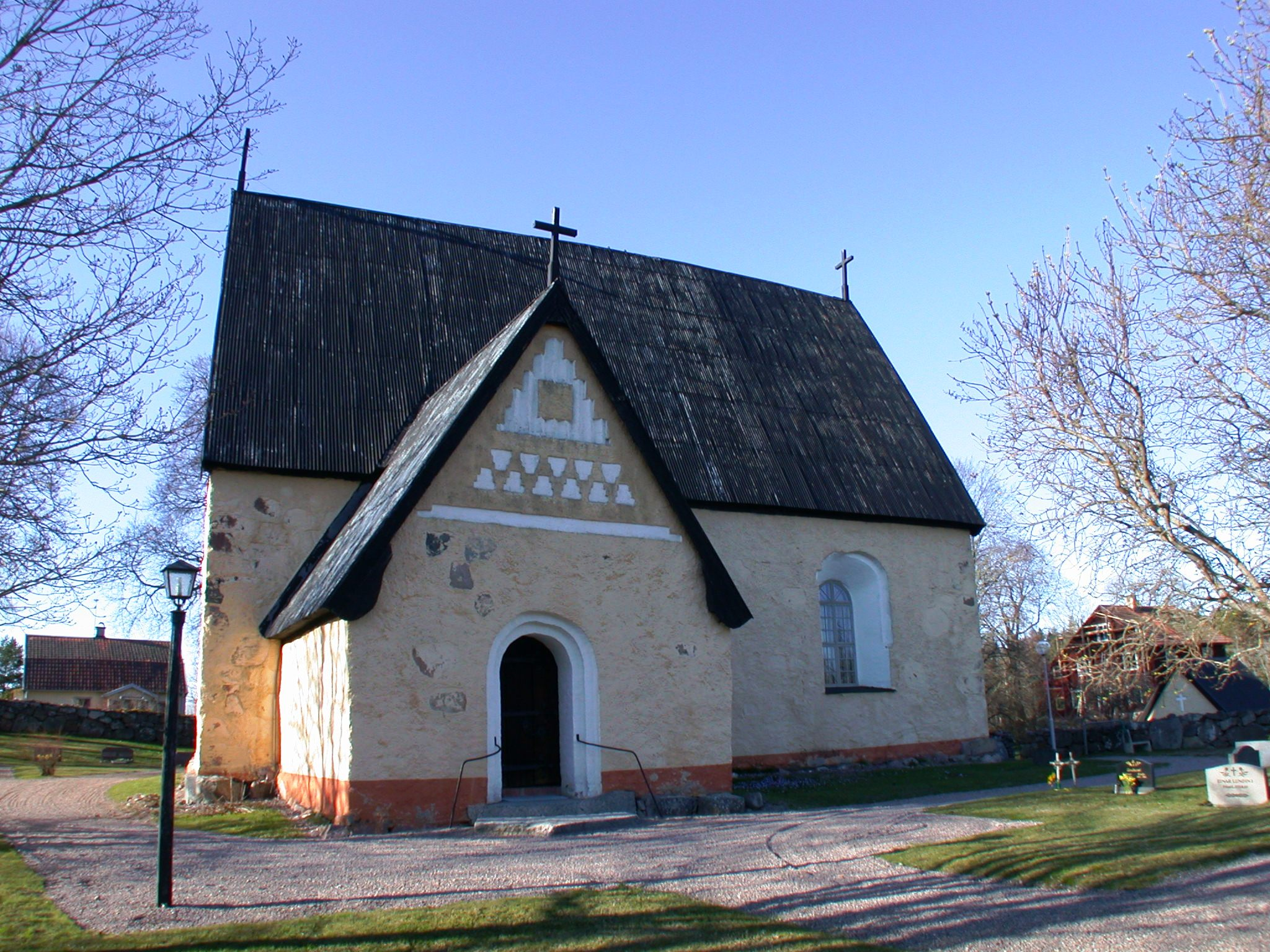
Bladåker Church, external view

Bladåker Church (Swedish: Bladåkers kyrka) is a Lutheran church in the Archdiocese of Uppsala in Uppsala County, Sweden.

== History and architecture ==
The first written record of a church on this site dates from 1316. The presently visible church, however, dates from the late 15th or early 16th century, with the exception of the sacristy (13th century) which is the only remains of the earlier, probably otherwise wooden, church. The church is constructed of fieldstone, with brick having been used for details and decorations in the façade. The external bell tower, made of wood, was erected in 1748. Inside, the church is decorated with frescos, dating from 1623. These were painted over during the 18th century but have since been restored. Among the church furnishings, a late medieval sculpture of the Holy Virgin and a number of wooden funeral coat of arms from the local nobility can be mentioned. The altarpiece is especially noteworthy as it was painted by Anna Maria Ehrenstrahl and donated by her to the church.

The church lies in a small hamlet, containing several well-preserved historical farmhouses and the former church school.
