= Johan Anton Bovin =

Swedish jurist and politician (1823–1894)

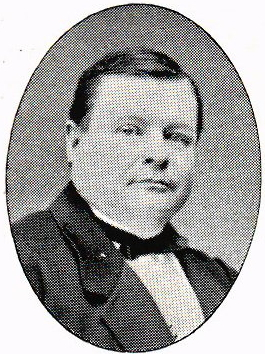
Johan Anton Bovin

Johan Anton Bovin (26 March 1823 – 11 June 1894) was a Swedish jurist and member of the Riksdag of the Estates.

Bovin was born on 26 March 1823 in Bladåker, Uppsala County, Sweden, to Johan Jakob Bovin and Kristina Gustafva Forsberg. He was mayor of the town of Sala from 1859 and district chief of Hedemora domsaga (Hedemora domsaga) from 1871 to 1889. He was a member of the Riksdag of the Estates representing the bourgeoisie class for the city of Sala in 1862–1863 and for the city of Sala, the city of Hedemora and the city of Eskilstuna in 1865–1866. After the estates were abolished and a parliamentary system adopted, he was a member of the Andra kammaren from 1867 to 1872, and was elected to the Arboga och Sala district. He was also chairman of the municipal council and county councilor.

== Sources ==
- Förteckning å vällofliga Borgareståndets ledamöter vid lagtima riksdagen i Stockholm år 1865, borgarståndets protokoll 21/10 1865
- Johan Anton Bovin i Albin Hildebrand, Svenskt porträttgalleri (1913), volym XXVI. Register
