= Mauritz Frumerie =

Swedish medal engraver and lithographer

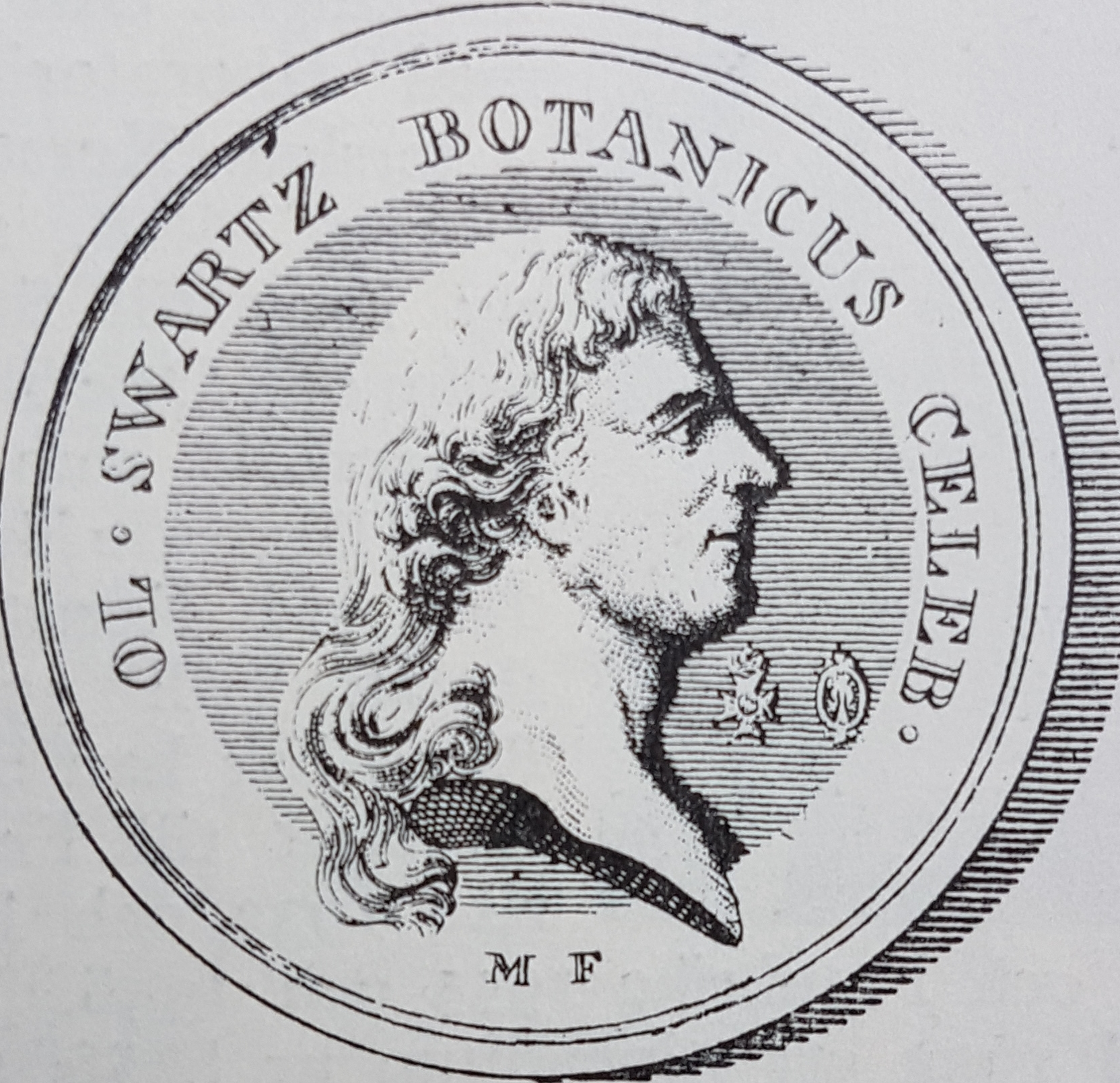
Olof Swartz, sketch drawn by Frumerie, 1824

Mauritz Frumerie (18 May 1775 – 7 March 1853) was a Swedish medal engraver and lithographer.

== Biography ==
Frumerie was born on 18 May 1775 in Karlskrona. He was the son of the inspector at the Admiralty College Klas Elias Frumerie and Margareta Sofia Stierngranat. Mauritz Frumerie was a grandson of Johan Frumerie (died 1756), secretary of the Admiralty in Karlskrona. From 1804 he was married to Katarina Magni.

Frumerie was a student and assistant to Carl Enhörning and from 1791 took part in the teaching at the Royal Swedish Academy of Fine Arts in Stockholm. He worked independently from 1806 and in 1808 was hired by the Academy of Sciences, being appointed as an agré at the Academy of Fine Arts the same year. As part of his work for the Academy of Sciences he made medals of its members until 1846 when he stopped this activity.

Among Frumerie's works are medals on the coronation of Charles XIII (1809), the jubelfesten in 1818, the jubilee parties of the Academy of Fine Arts and the Academy of Sciences in 1839, and of Fredrik Henrik af Chapman. Frumerie also worked as a portrait lithographer. Frumerie is represented at, among others, Uppsala University Library.

== Gallery ==
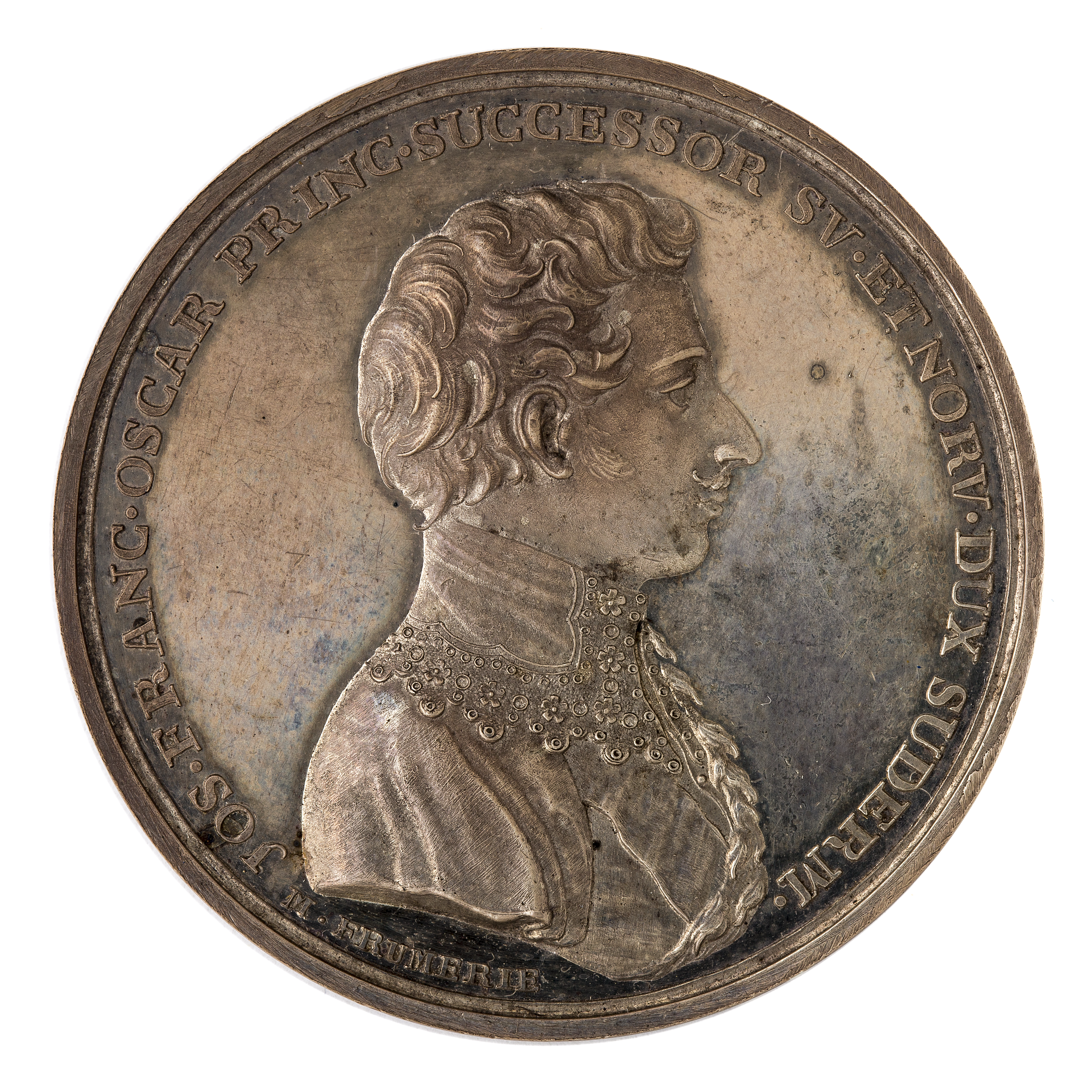
Front of medal depicting Oscar I in profile, 1818

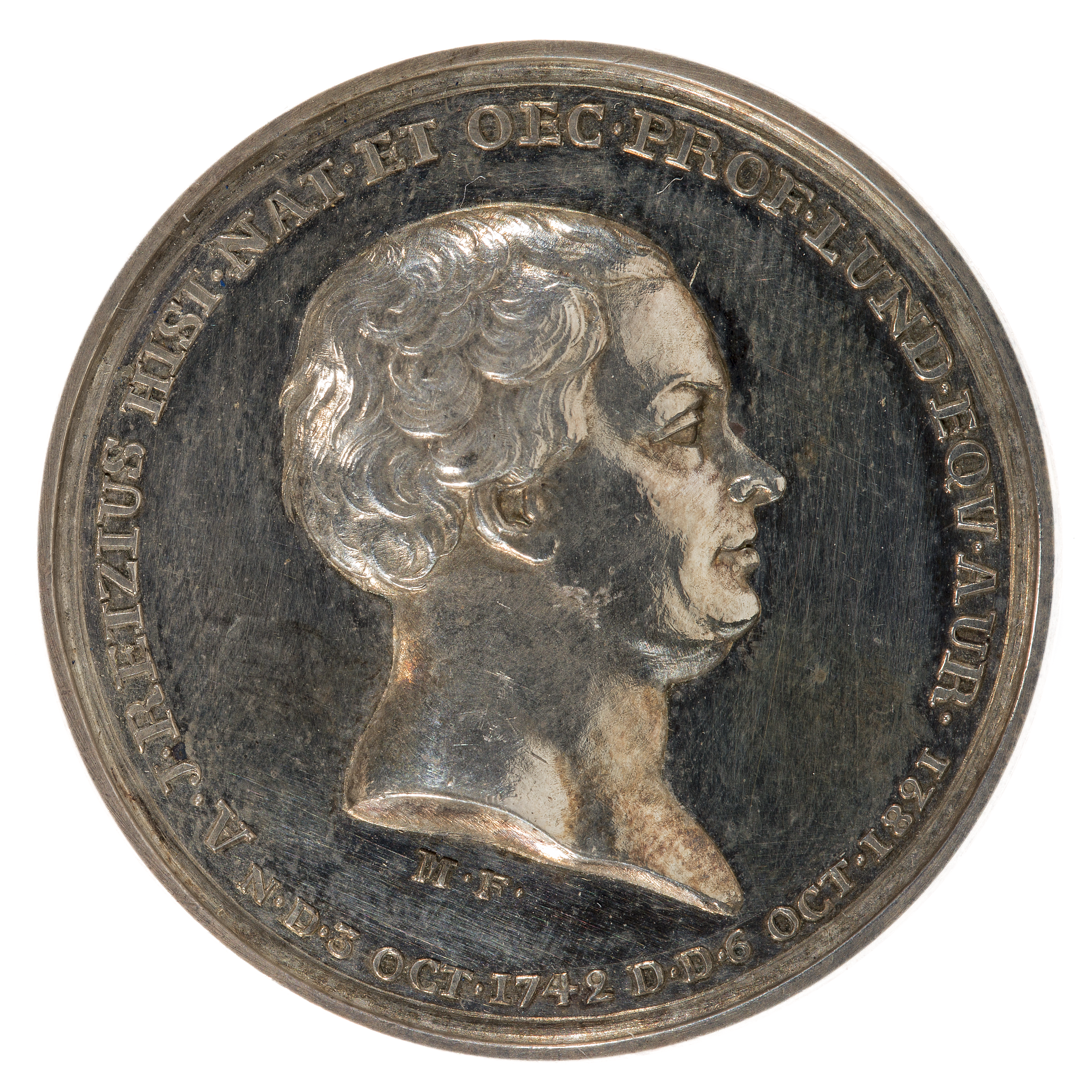
Medal with Anders Johan Retzius in profile, 1842

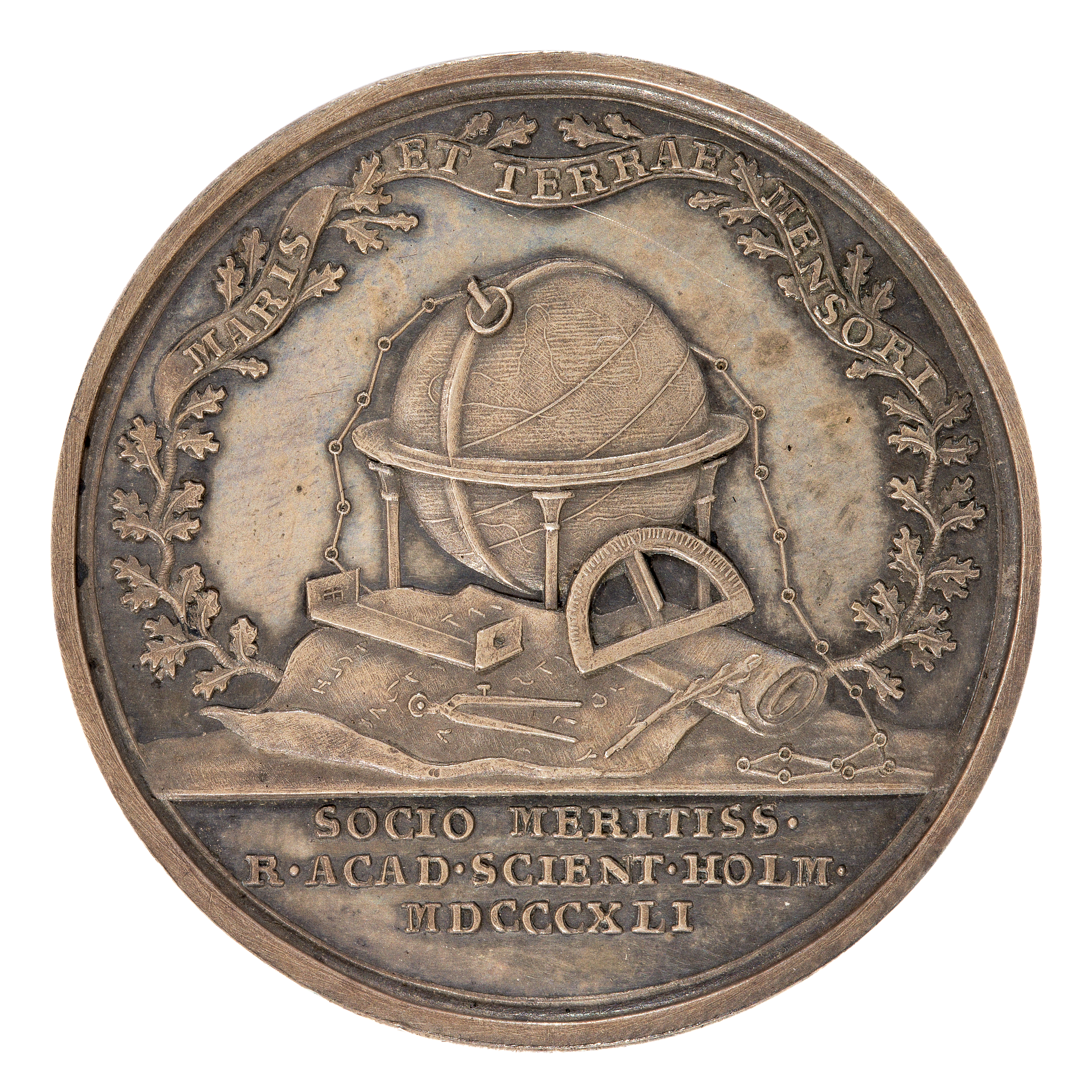
Back of medal with image of scientific instruments and globe with wreath of oak leaves, 1841

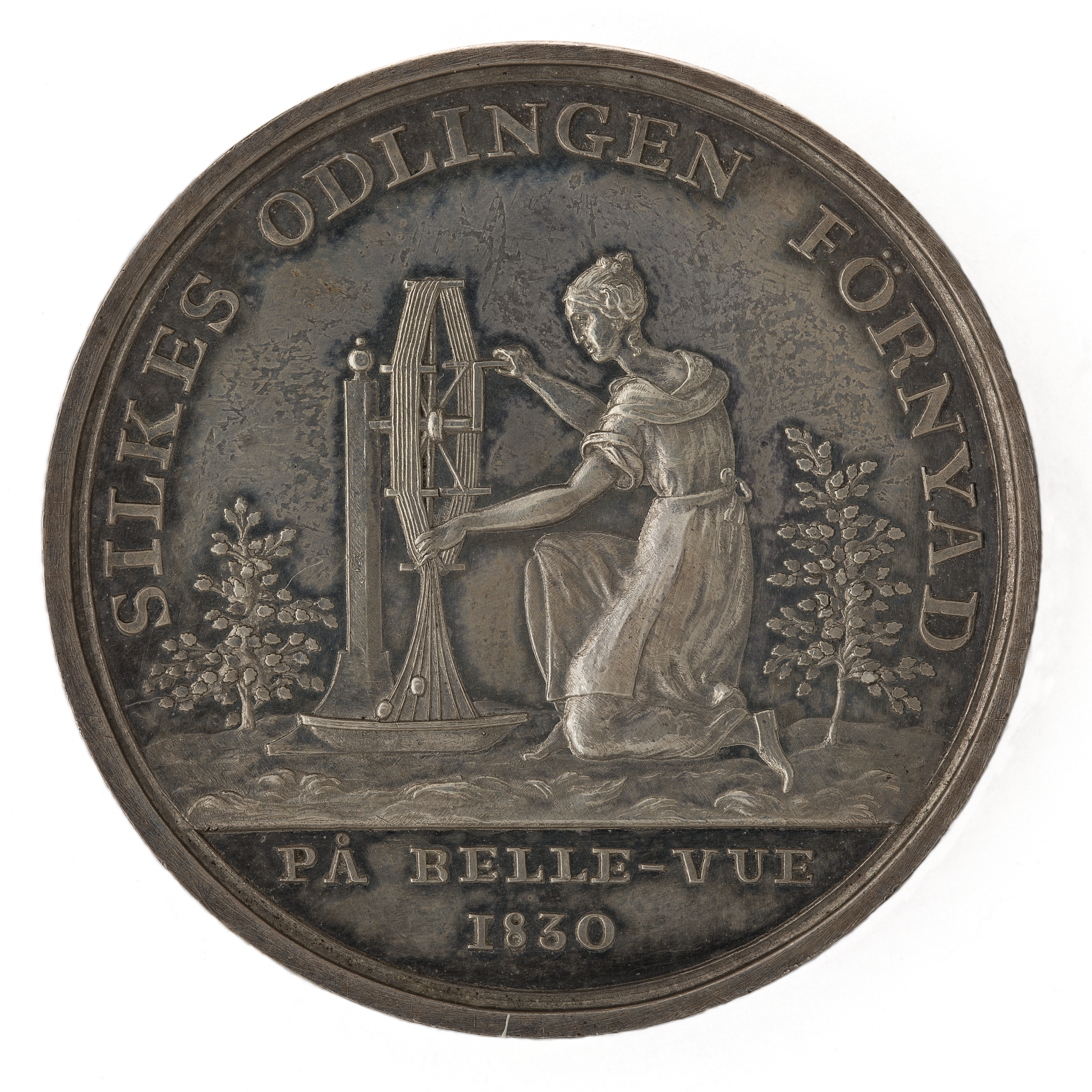
Back of medal, struck on the occasion of the renewal of the silk farm at Bellevue in 1830, 1830

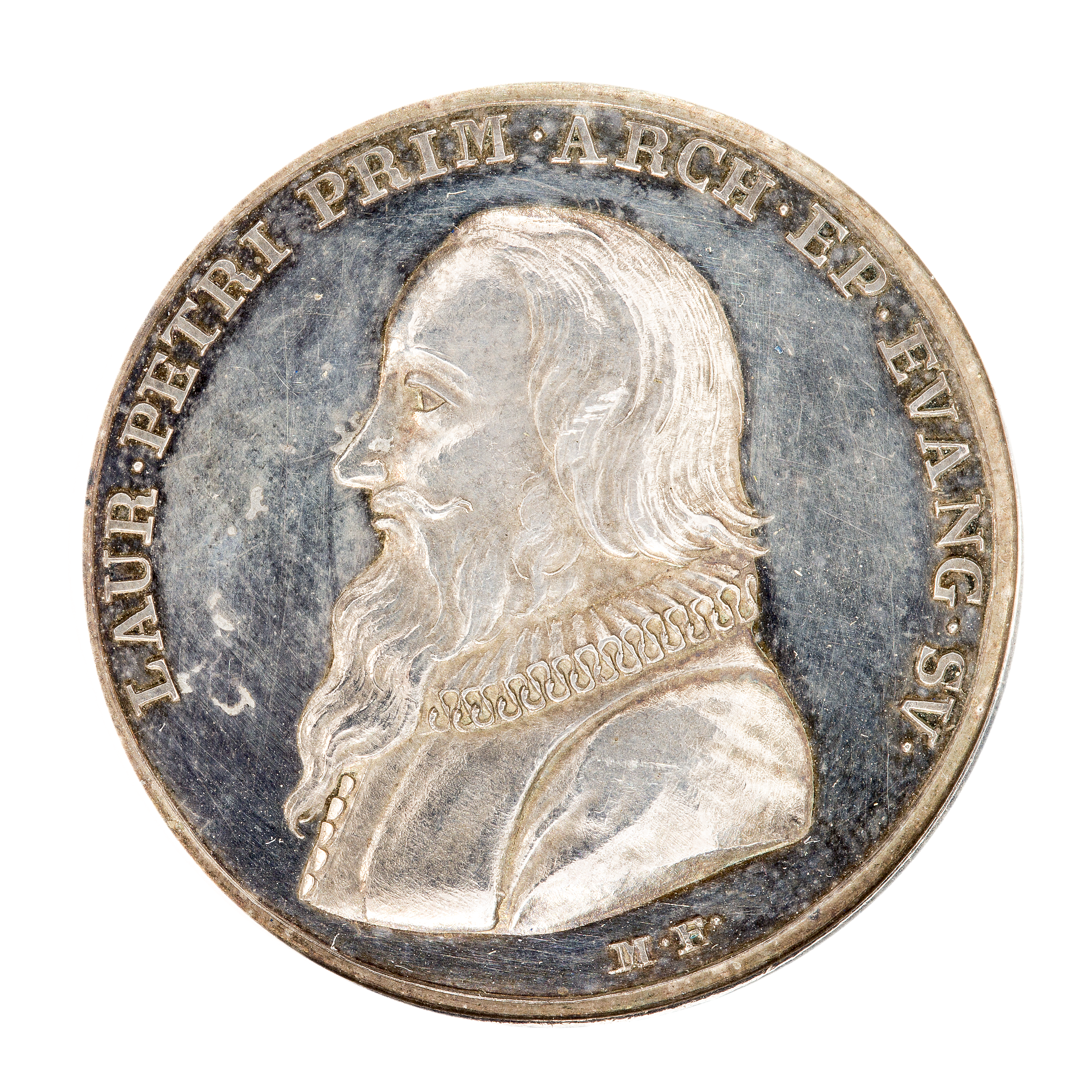
Front of medal depicting Laurentius Petri in profile, 1842

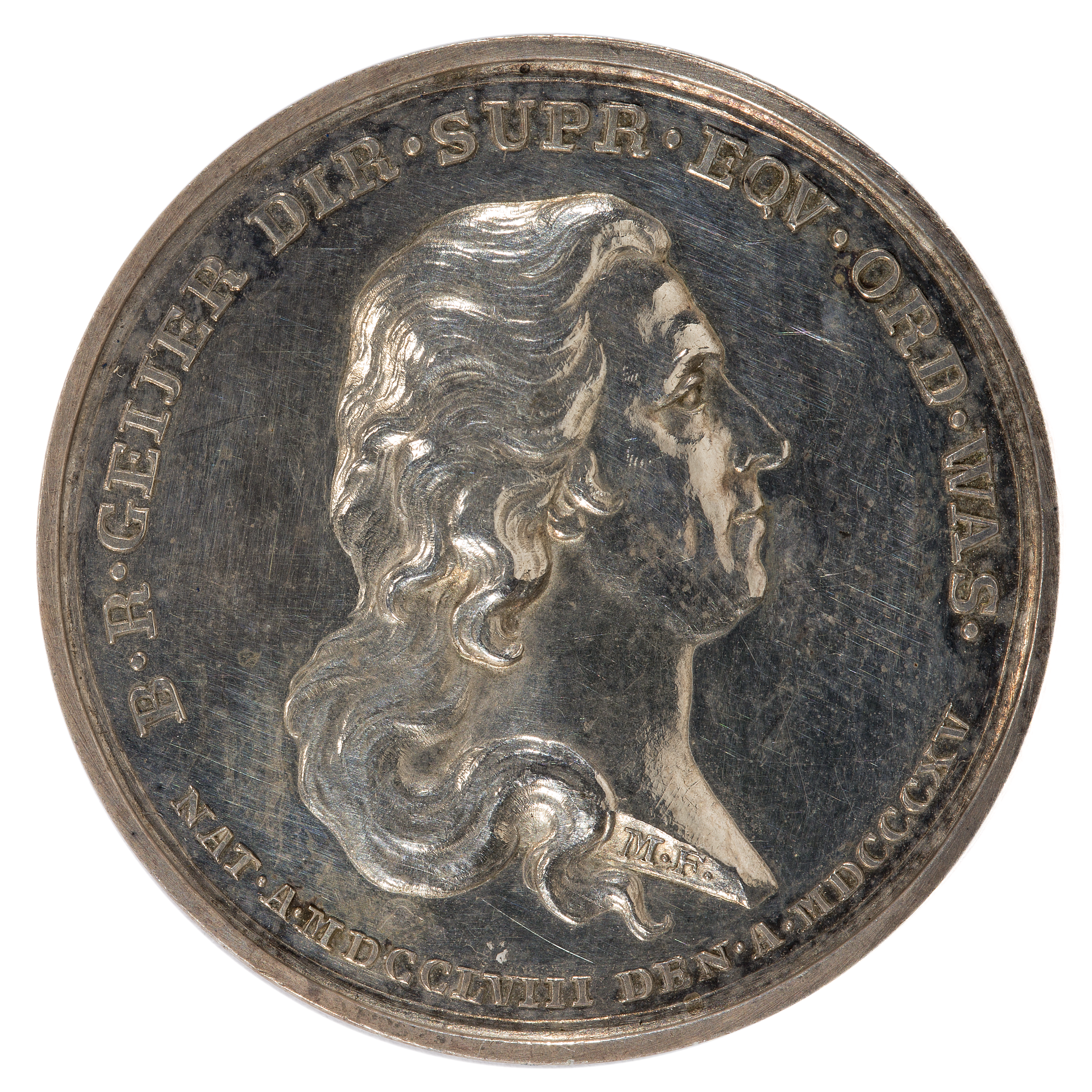
Medal with Bengt Reinhold Geijer in profile, 1840

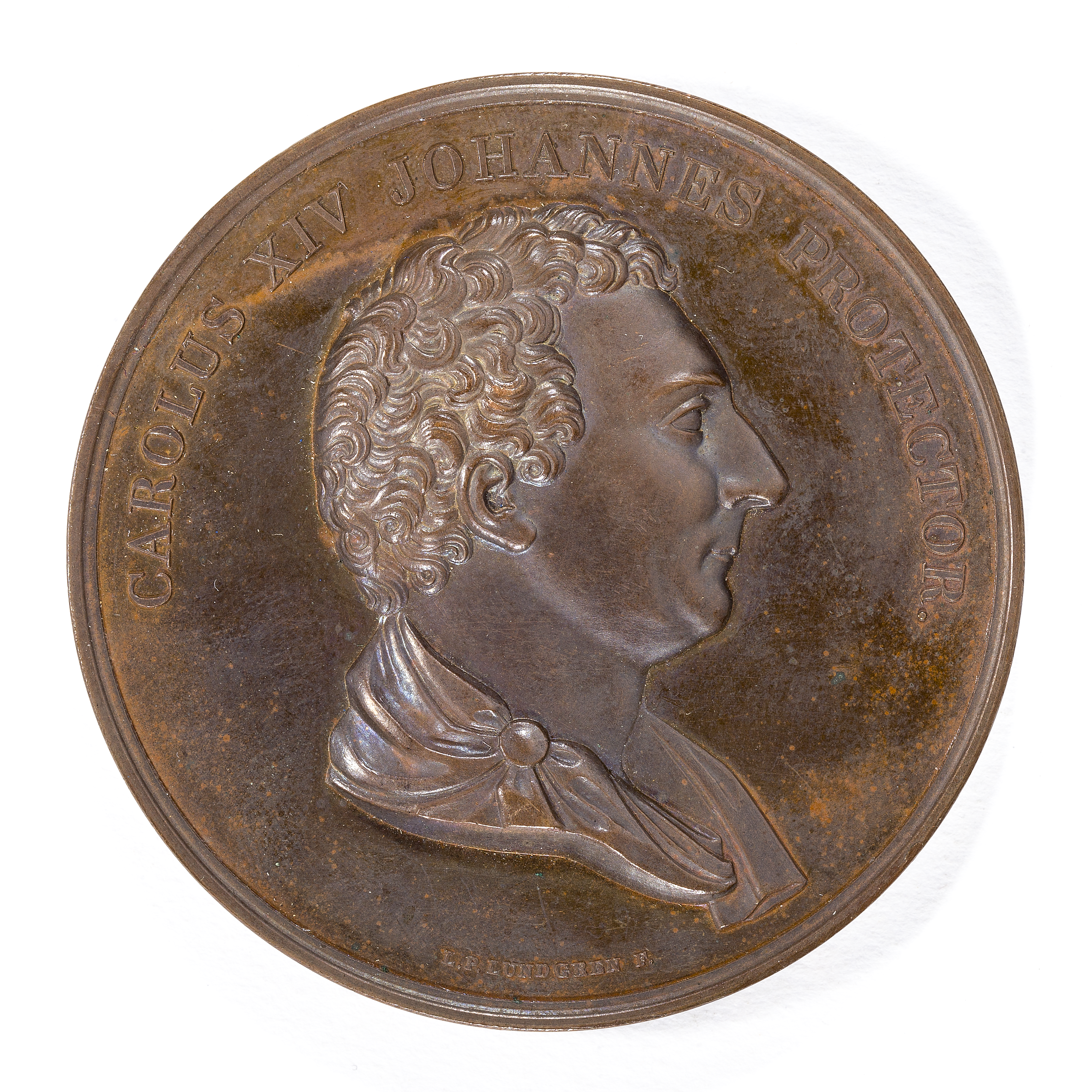
Front of medal depicting Karl Johan in profile, 1839

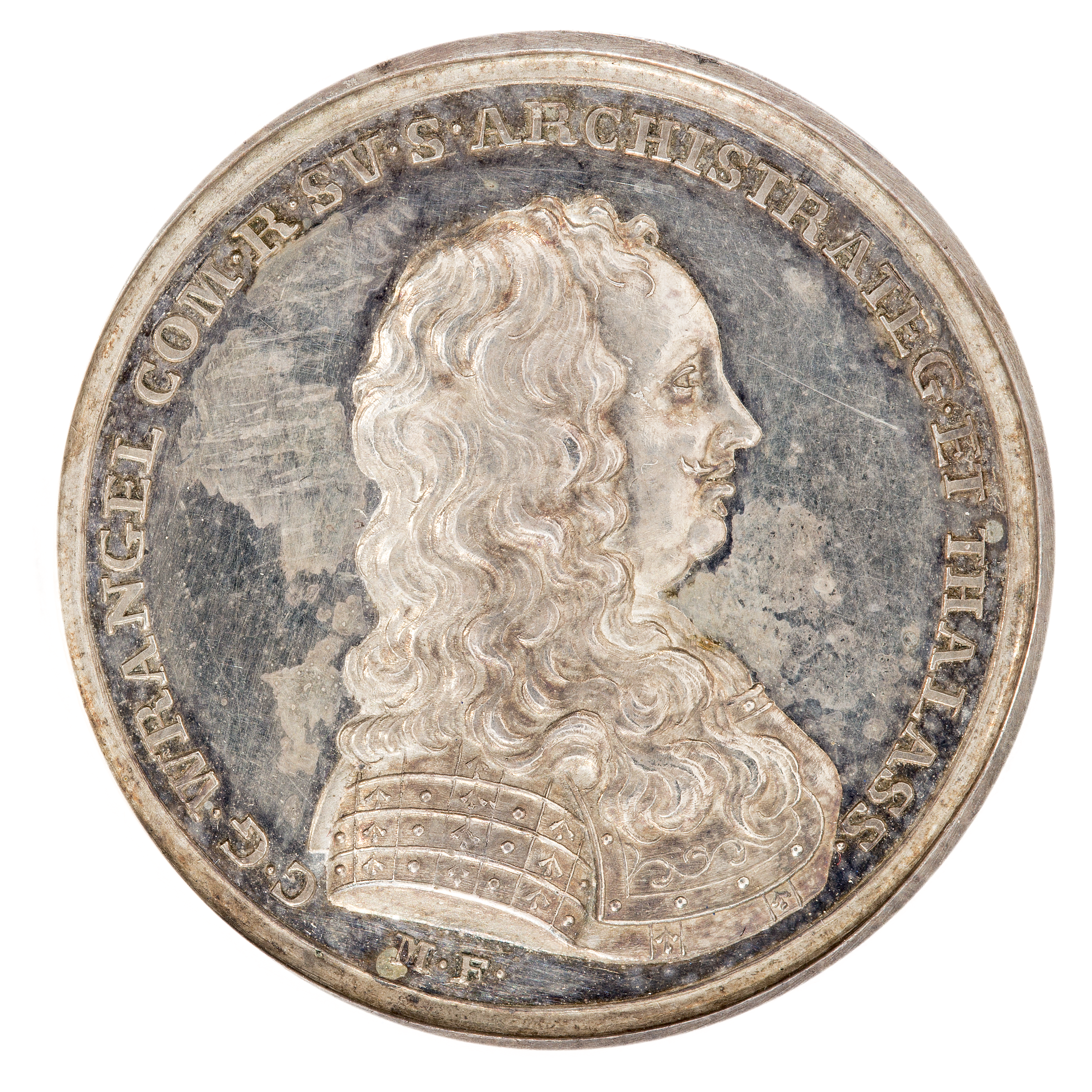
Front of medal depicting Carl Gustaf Wrangel in profile, 1841
