= Agnes de Frumerie =

Swedish artist

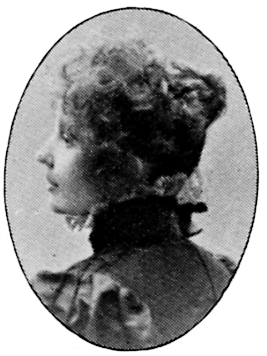
- Born: 20 November 1869; Skövde, Sweden
- Died: 2 April 1937 (aged 67); Stockholm, Sweden
- Known for: Sculpture, ceramics

Agnes Eleonora Augusta Emilia de Frumerie (20 November 1869 – 2 April 1937) was a Swedish artist who spent much of her career in France.

She was born Agnes Eleonora Augusta Emilia Kjellberg in Skövde and studied at the Royal Swedish Academy of Fine Arts in Stockholm from 1886 to 1890. She lived in Paris from 1892 to 1923, where she studied with Rodin. She produced mainly smaller sculptures and ceramics. She married Gustaf de Frumerie, a captain in the Swedish army and later a doctor, in Paris. During the 1890s, she became part of the avant-garde group of artists in Paris, including August Strindberg whose image she captured in a sculpture. She also worked in collaboration with Edmond Lachenal.

De Frumerie died in Stockholm at the age of 67.

Her work is included in the collections of the Nationalmuseum in Stockholm and the Västergötlands museum in Skara.

== Selected work ==
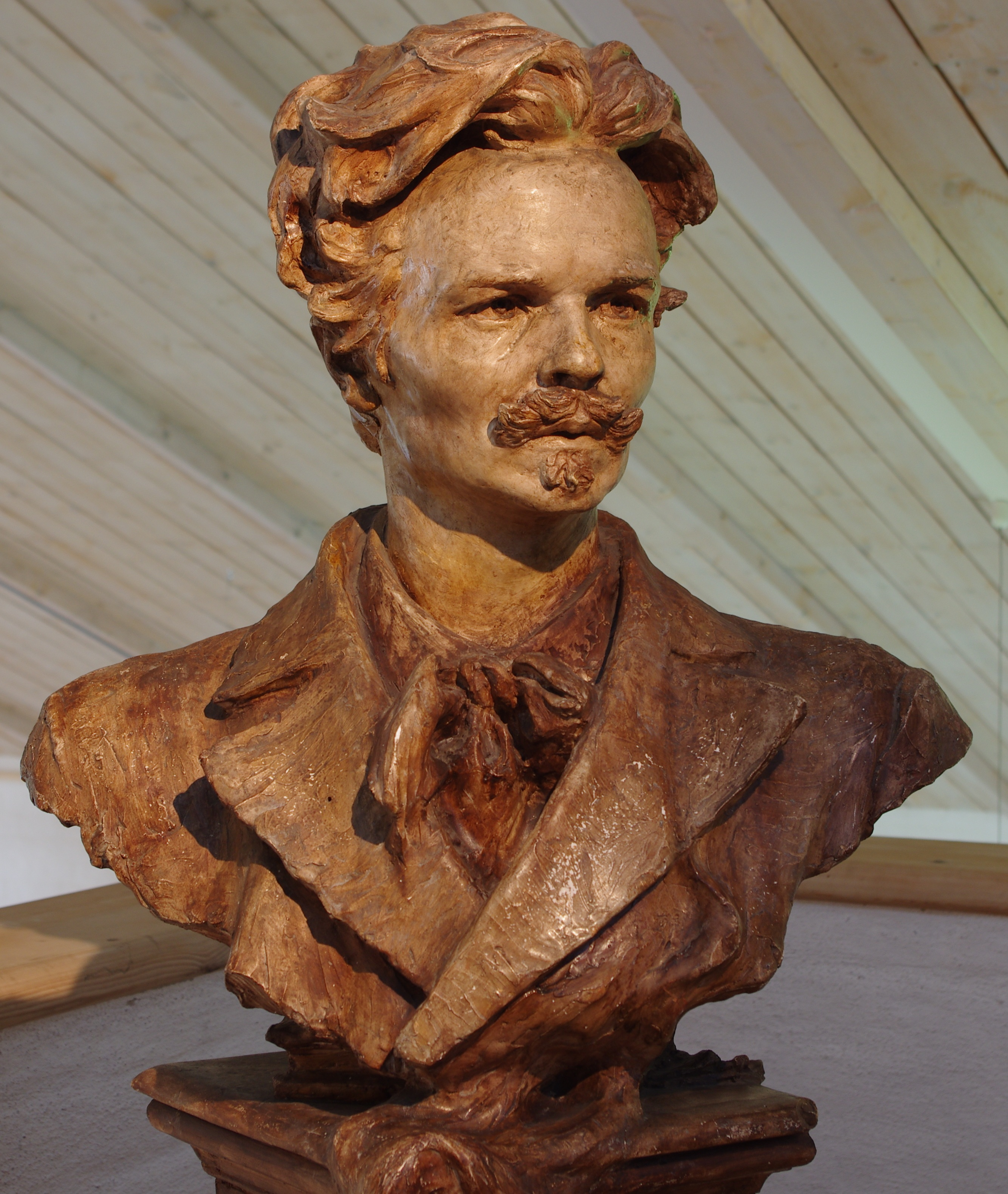
August Strindberg, sculpture 1895

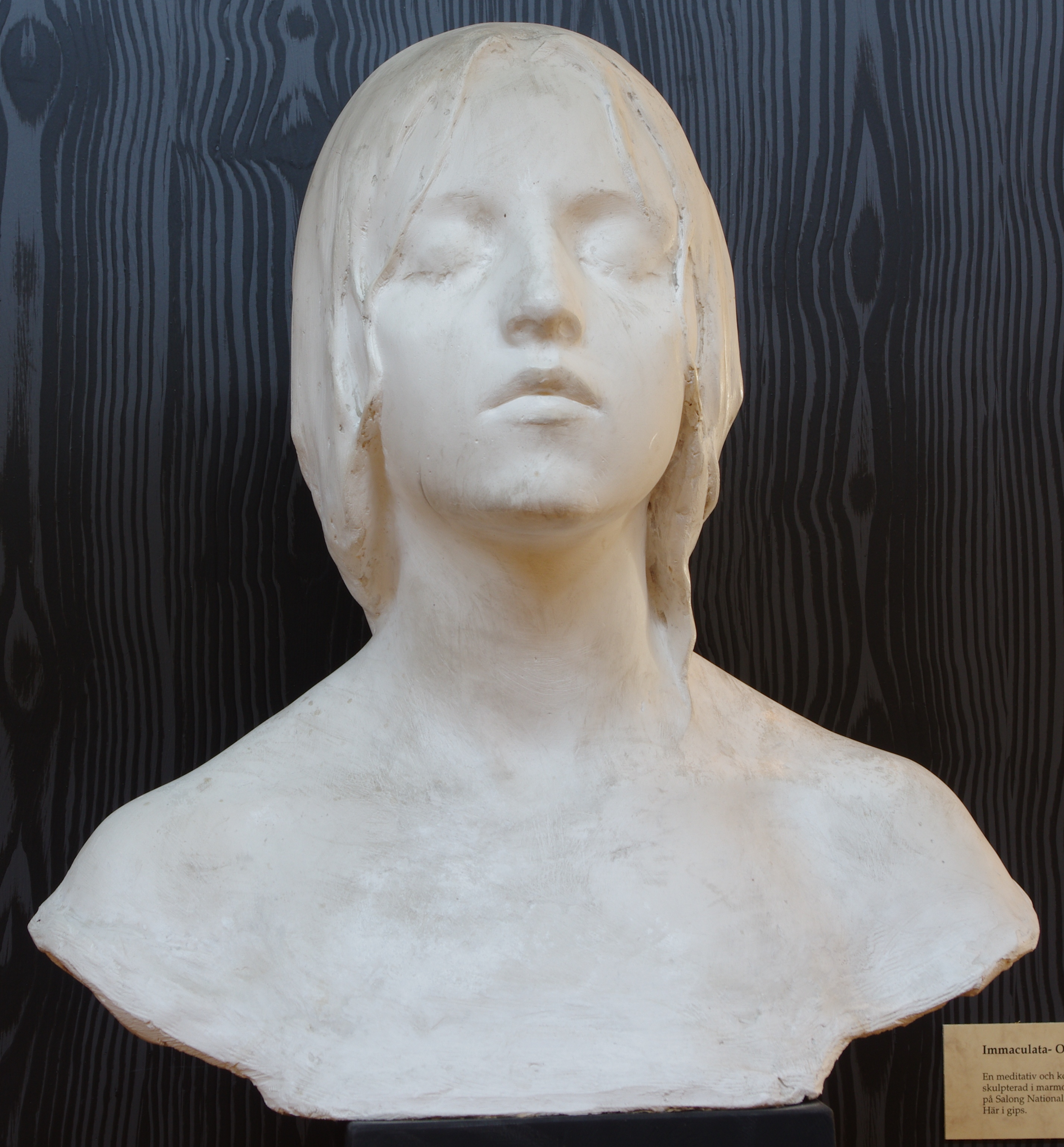
Immaculata, sculpture 1897

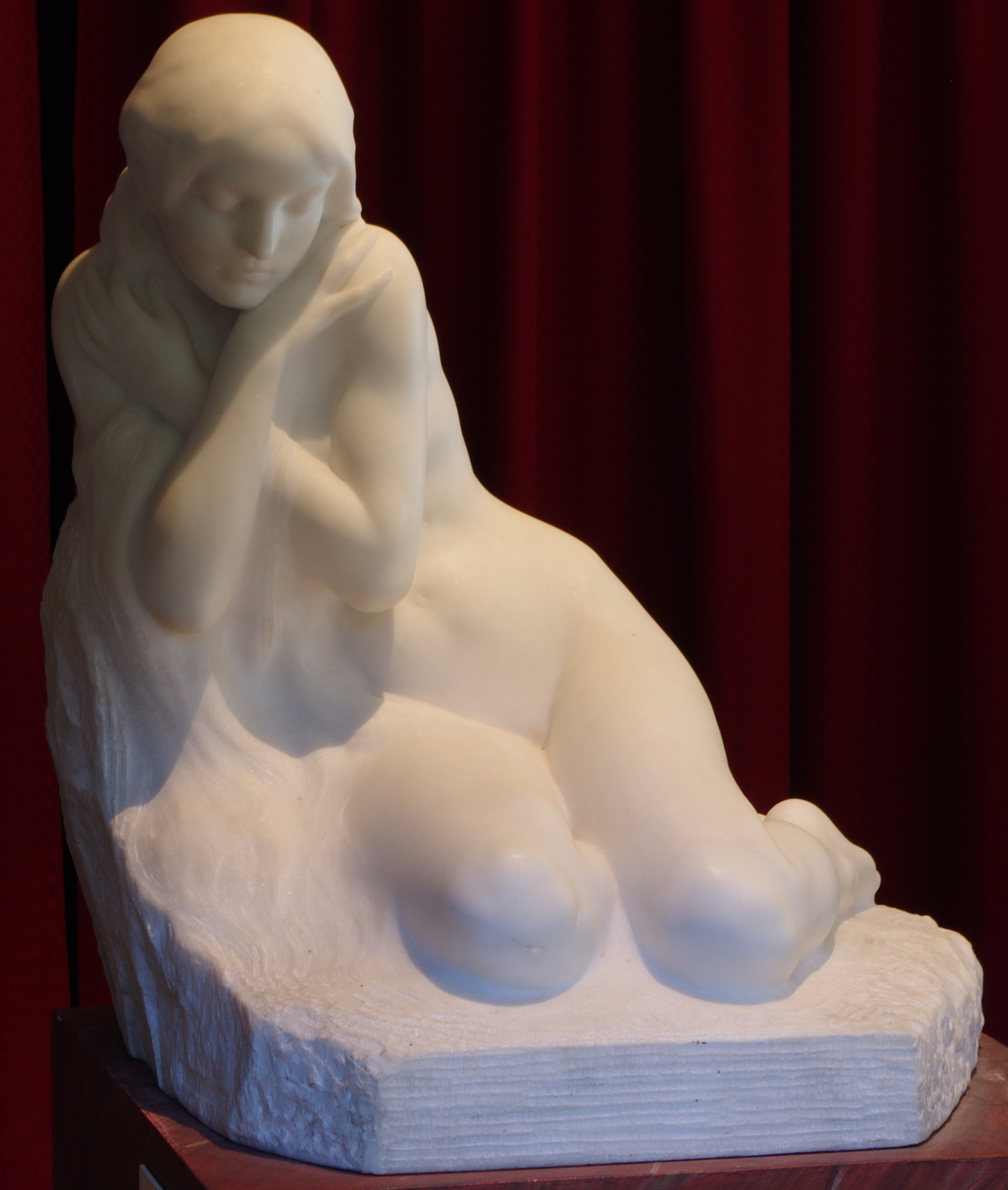
Jag fryser, sculpture 1921
