= David Frumerie =

Swedish painter (1641–1677)

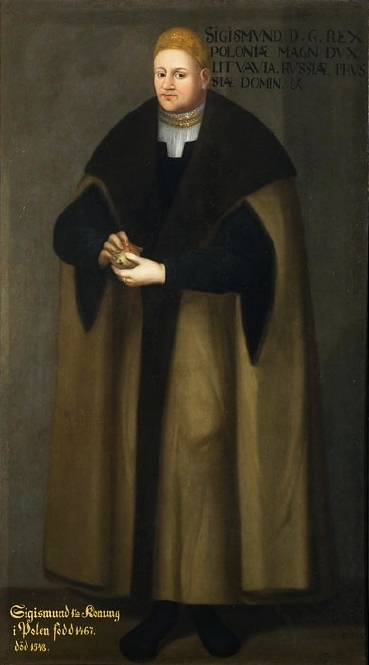
Portrait of Sigismund I the Old, 1667

David Frumerie (1641–1677) was a Swedish painter.

Frumerie was born in 1641. He was the son of Martin Frumerie, the ancestor of the Swedish family of Walloon origin Frumerie. At the request of Louis De Geer, Martin moved to Sweden in 1635, sailing out from Leiden. Frumerie was married to Barbro Eriksdotter Löök. He was the cousin of Caleb Frumerie, who was later knighted Caleb de Frumerie. As was active as a painter, carrying out a number of decorative and gilding works at the then newly built Drottningholm Castle from 1666 until his death. A portrait of Gustav I of Sweden by Frumerie is at the Gripsholm, and about ten paintings by this artist are at Nationalmuseum.

== Gallery ==
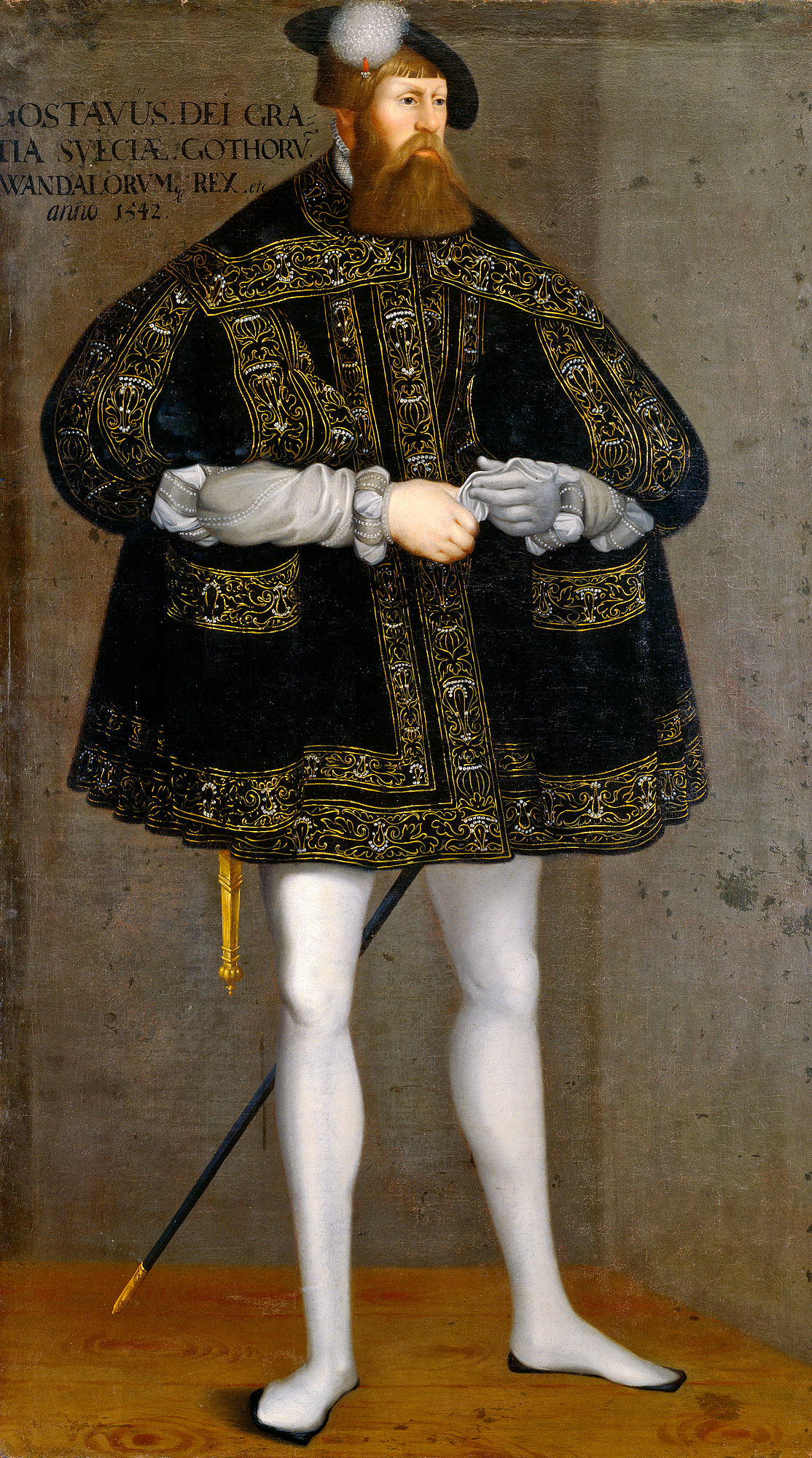

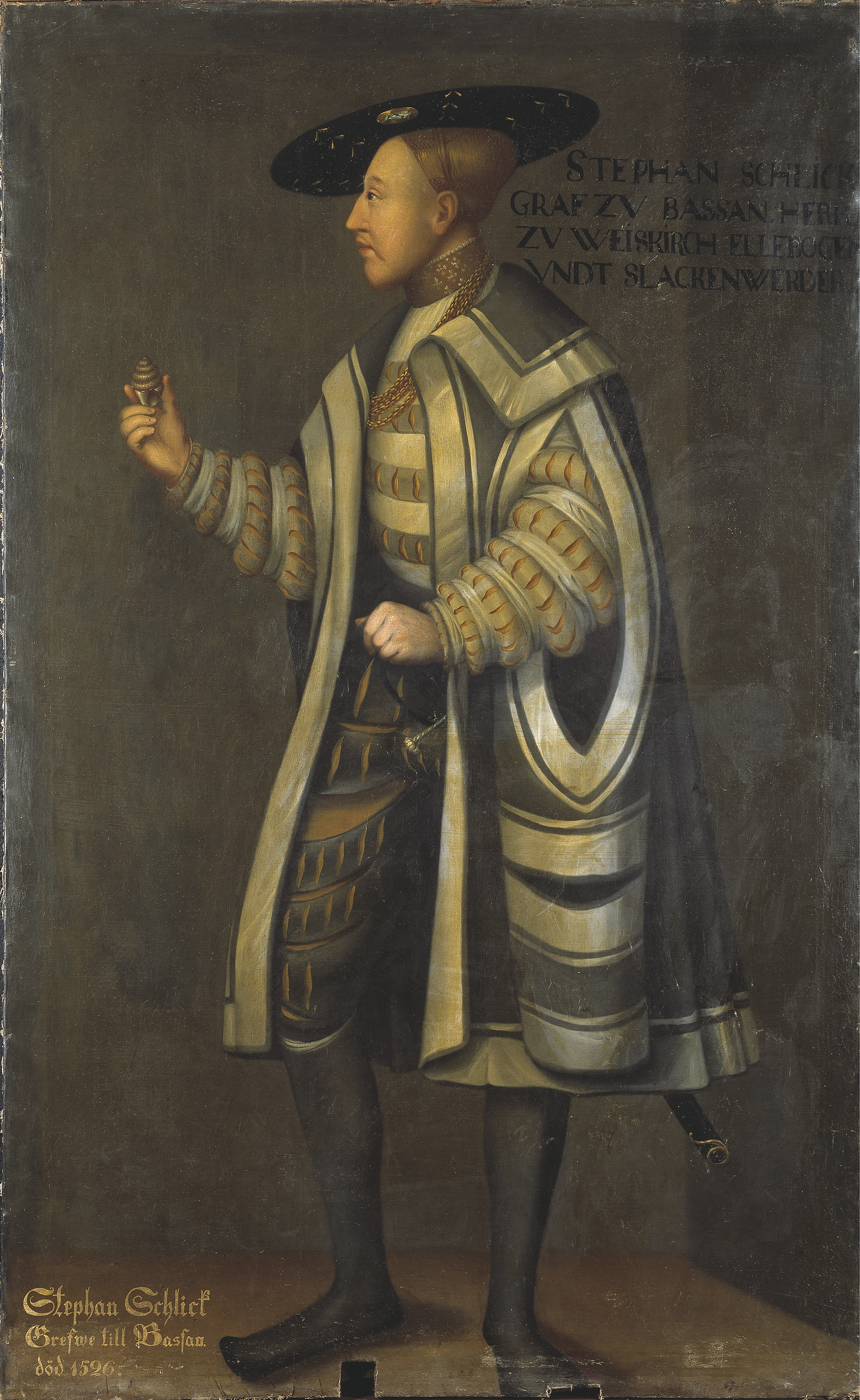

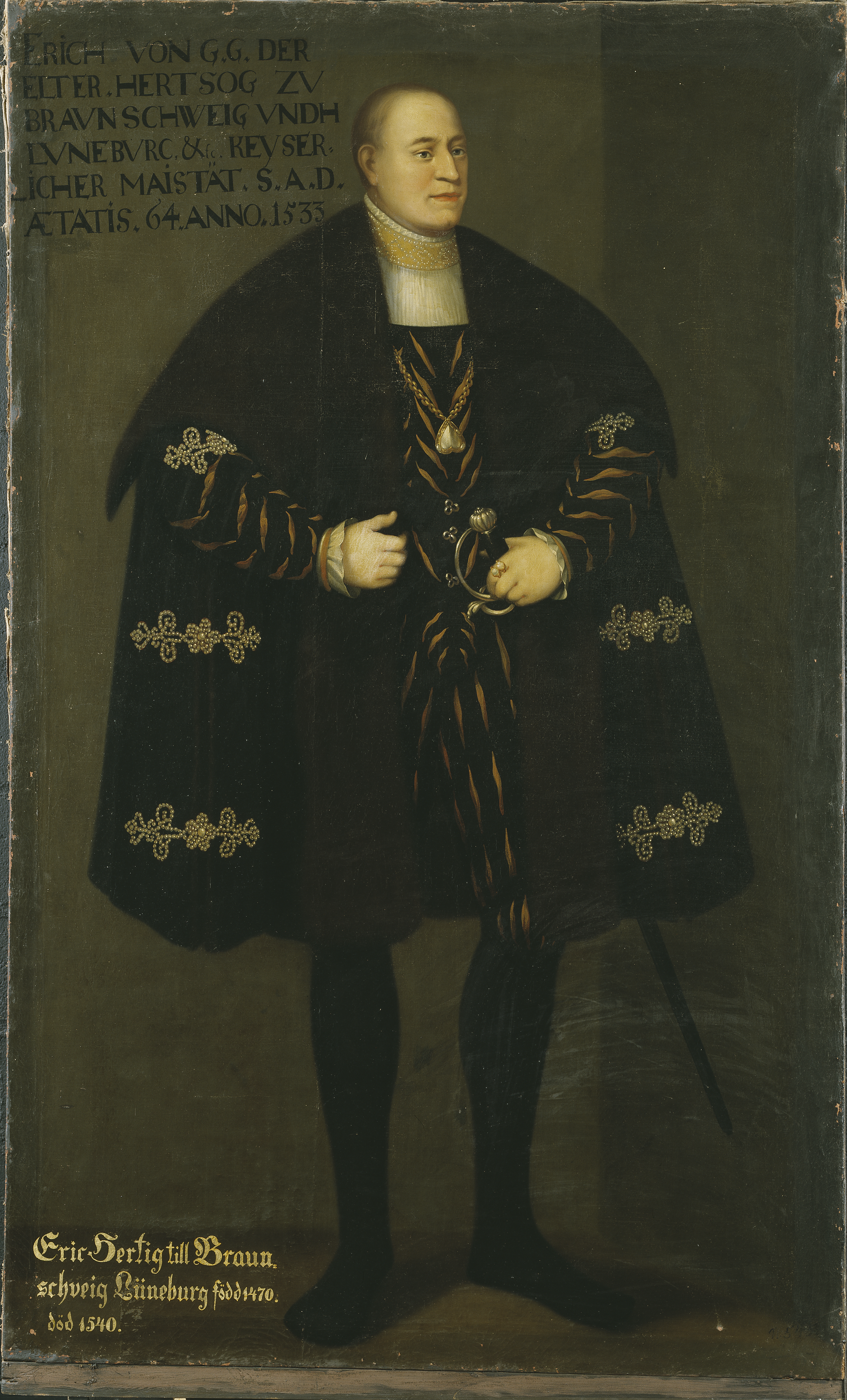
