= Gunnar de Frumerie =

Swedish composer and pianist

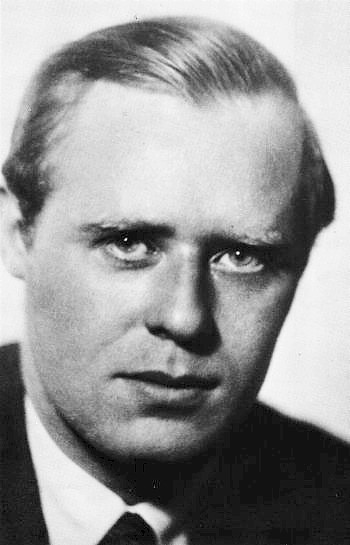
De Frumerie in the 1930s.

Per Gunnar Fredrik de Frumerie (20 July 1908 – 9 September 1987) was a Swedish composer and pianist. He was the son of architect Gustaf de Frumerie and Maria Helleday.

De Frumerie was born in Nacka, Stockholm County in 1908. After studying piano in Stockholm and Vienna, he studied under Alfred Cortot in Paris. He then studied at the Royal College of Music, Stockholm from 1923 to 1928. Frumerie later taught the piano at the same college, from 1945 to 1974.

His compositions covered a wide area, from grand opera to piano miniatures, but he is best remembered for his piano works. His works possess a Brahmsian complexity mixed with an impressionistic elegance. His music has been compared to that of such composers as Lars-Erik Larsson or Wilhelm Peterson-Berger.

Although not noted for his theatre work, he did write an opera, Singoalla (1940). He wrote many songs, often to words by Pär Lagerkvist. The cello concerto (1984) has an interesting history. It was adapted from his second cello sonata. He then adapted it into a trombone concerto, and was his last completed work. It was specifically written for the Swedish trombone virtuoso Christian Lindberg.

His pupils included Laci Boldemann.

The Swedish mezzo-soprano Anne Sofie von Otter is related to Frumerie, as she is descended from the Frumerie family. They were both members of the Royal Swedish Academy of Music. The soprano Nina Stemme is also a Frumerie relative.

De Frumerie died in Täby, Stockholm County in 1987.

== Selected compositions ==
- Duo for oboe and viola (1928)
- Piano Trio No.1, Op.7
- Variations and Fugue for Piano and Orchestra Op.11 (1932)
- Pastoral Suite, Op.13 (1933)
- Violin Concerto, Op.19 (1936, rev. 1975-6)
- Piano Quartet No.1 in C minor, Op.23
- Symphonic Variations, Op.25 (1940–41)
- Piano Trio No.2, Op.45
- Singoalla (1940)
- Cello Sonata No.2 (1949)
- Circulus Quintus, twenty-four pieces in all keys for piano, Op. 62 (1965)
- Divertimento for clarinet (or viola) and cello, Op.63 (1966)
- Piano Sonata No.1, Op. 64
- Piano Sonata No.2, Op. 65
- Tio variationer över en svensk folkvisa (Ten Variations on a Swedish Folk Song) for viola and guitar, Op.69b (1977)
- Musica per nove, Nonet, Op.75
- Dante, Op.76 (1977, for voice and orchestra)
- Cello Concerto, Op.81 (1984)
- Trombone Concerto, Op.81 (1987; posthumous)
- Sonata for trombone and piano, Op.81b (posthumous)
- Organ Overture, Aria and Fugue
- St. John's Eve: Ballet in two acts and four pictures (Released 1983)
