= Karl Emil Bovin =

Swedish physician

Karl Emil Bovin (19 August 1868 – 8 August 1962) was a Swedish physician.

Bovin was born on 19 August 1868 in Stockholm, Sweden, to Carl Jacob and Emma Elonora, née Petterson. He studied at Karolinska Institute, and later in Austria, Germany, France, England, Denmark, Finland, and Norway. He became a Bachelor of Medical Sciences at Karolinska Institute in 1891, a licentiate in medicine (Medicine licentiat) in 1897 and a Doctor of Medicine in 1906. He was an assistant professor at the Serafimerlasarettet and the Allmänna BB from 1896 to 1899, assistant professor and assistant surgeon at Sabbatsberg Hospital between 1899 and 1901, and an associate professor of obstetrics and gynecology at Karolinska Institute from 1906 until 1917. In 1911 he became a teacher at the midwifery school in Stockholm and from 1924 to 1933 he was professor and head teacher there, as well as chief physician and director at Södra barnbördshuset.

Bovin was also chairman of the Swedish Medical Association from 1928 to 1932, of the Swedish Medical Society from 1932 to 1933 and a member of the National Swedish Board of Health between 1930 and 1935. He is buried at Norra begravningsplatsen in Stockholm.

He married Alma Karolina Wanselin on 17 November 1900.

== Sources ==
- Svensk uppslagsbok, Malmö, 1939
- Bovin, Karl Emil in Vem är det, 1943
