= Knut Adolf Bovin =

Swedish gardener and writer

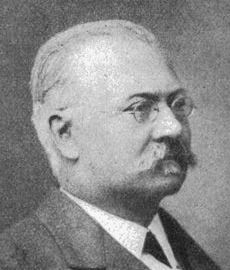
Knut Adolf Bovin, c. 1900

Knut Adolf Bovin (15 October 1853 – 8 August 1926) was a Swedish gardener, publicist and writer, active in Stockholm.

Bovin was a teacher at the Royal Swedish Academy of Agriculture and Forestry and the Svenska trädgårdsföreningen in Stockholm, and worked as a landscape architect and landscape gardener from 1885 until 1890. From 1890 he worked as a commercial gardener focusing on perennial plants. In 1895, Bovin began publishing the garden magazine Viola, which is still published and has been widely distributed. He was the initiator of the Gartnerfonden (1897), a support fund for gardeners, and the Swedish Trade Gardeners' Association (1902). He also worked actively for the formation of an association for fruit growers, the Swedish Pomological Society, and became one of its founders (1900).

He was married to Anna Jansson. The couple had a child, daughter Karin, born in 1888.
