= Gustaf de Frumerie =

Swedish architect

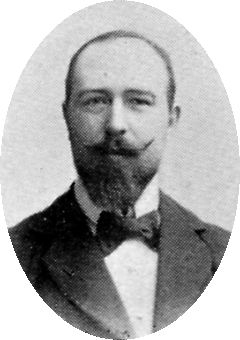
- Gustaf de Frumerie
- Born: 10 April 1872; Västerviks församling, Västervik Municipality, Sweden
- Died: 21 December 1947 (aged 75); Nacka församling, Nacka Municipality, Sweden
- Occupation: Architect

Gustaf de Frumerie (10 April 1872 – 21 December 1947) was a Swedish architect.

== Career ==
Gustaf de Frumerie graduated in 1890 and received his education as an architect at the Royal Institute of Technology in Stockholm in 1895. He was employed as an architect at the Stockholm Gas Plant (1904–1906) and at the Stockholm Electricity Plant (1906–1937).

As an architect at the gas and electricity plants, Gustaf de Frumerie worked under fellow Swedish architect Ferdinand Boberg, who was hired by the city to design the new large technical facilities for gas and electricity production, which were built around the turn of the 20th century. Gustaf de Frumerie became known thanks to the building of some large office and industrial facilities for Stockholm's gas, electricity and waterworks, where the chief architect was Boberg, whom he later succeeded in this capacity.

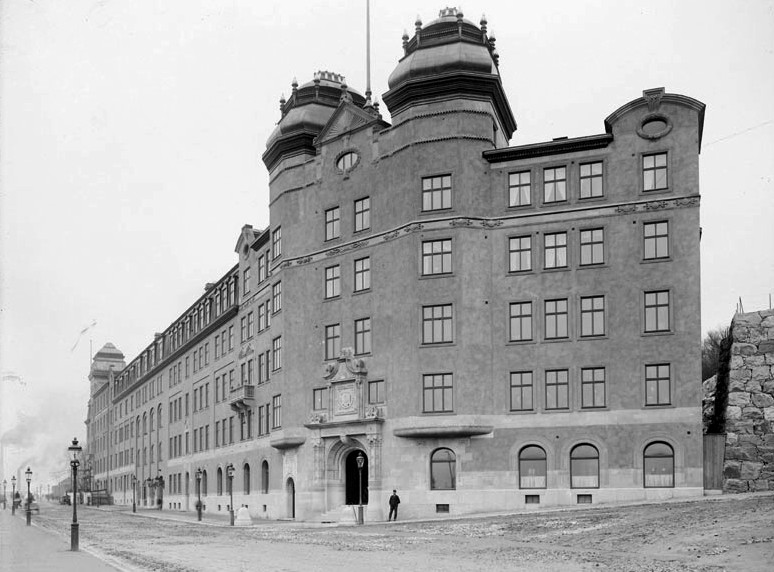
Stockholms gasverk 1914

Among his works is the building for Stockholm's water pipeline and Stockholm's gasworks on Torsgatan (Stockholm), which he designed together with Boberg. The building was inaugurated in 1906. Today, Stockholm Water has its premises there.

In the years 1910 to 1920, de Frumerie was responsible for the expansion of Värtaverket in Stockholm and in 1929 for the extension of Kronobergsstationen on Kronobergsgatan (Stockholm). In 1913, he was the architect of Lillsjöstationen in Ulvsunda, whose facades he designed in a brick architecture with national romantic elements. In 1926 he designed Högalidsstationen on Krukmakargatan (now demolished). The facility is characterized by powerful building volumes and design with classicist form elements.

He was the architect of the Untraverket at Dalälven in northern Uppland, which was inaugurated in 1918 and was the first hydropower plant to supply electricity to Stockholm. Gustaf de Frumerie also designed poles for arc lamps at Norrbro and Norrmalmstorg. Norrmalmstorg's golden Art Nouveau-inspired luminaires on high poles were erected in 1911 and taken down in connection with a rebuilding in 1967 for right-hand traffic. In 1994, they were put back into place. They were, in fact, copies made after Frumerie's preserved drawings, as the original luminaires were lost. In the 1920s, he developed the prototype into a lamppost with a curved upper part.

Together with Kristian Sundstrand, he ran the architectural firm Frumerie och Sundstrand in 1907–1916. The two architects designed together, among others, Marieborgsskolan in Vastervik (1913), Nordstjernans mineralvattenfabrik in Stockholm (1910–11), and buildings on Eriksbergsgatan (1912–13) and Kungsgatan (1914).

== Gallery ==
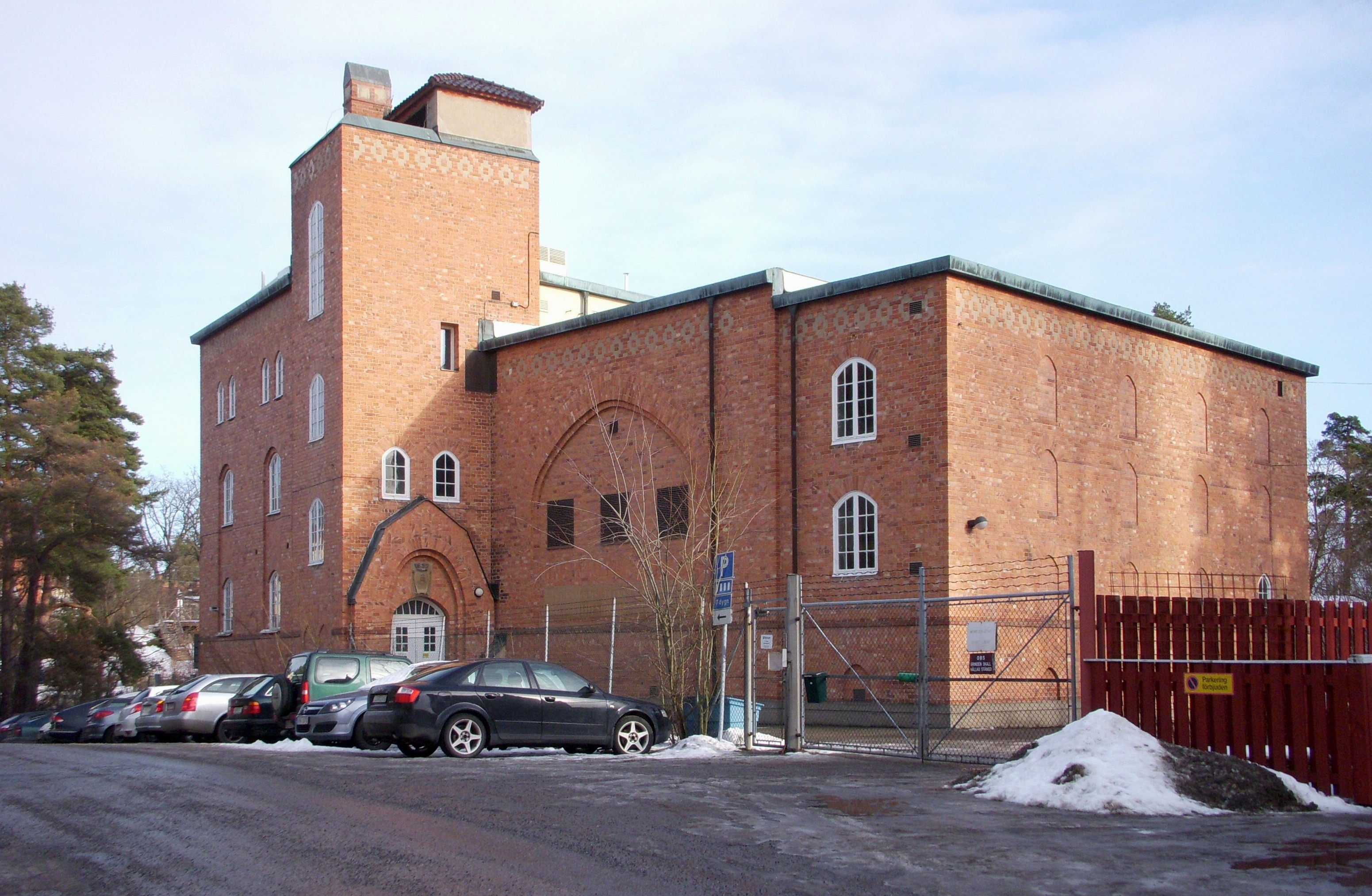
Lillsjöstationen, Ulvsunda, Stockholm (1913)

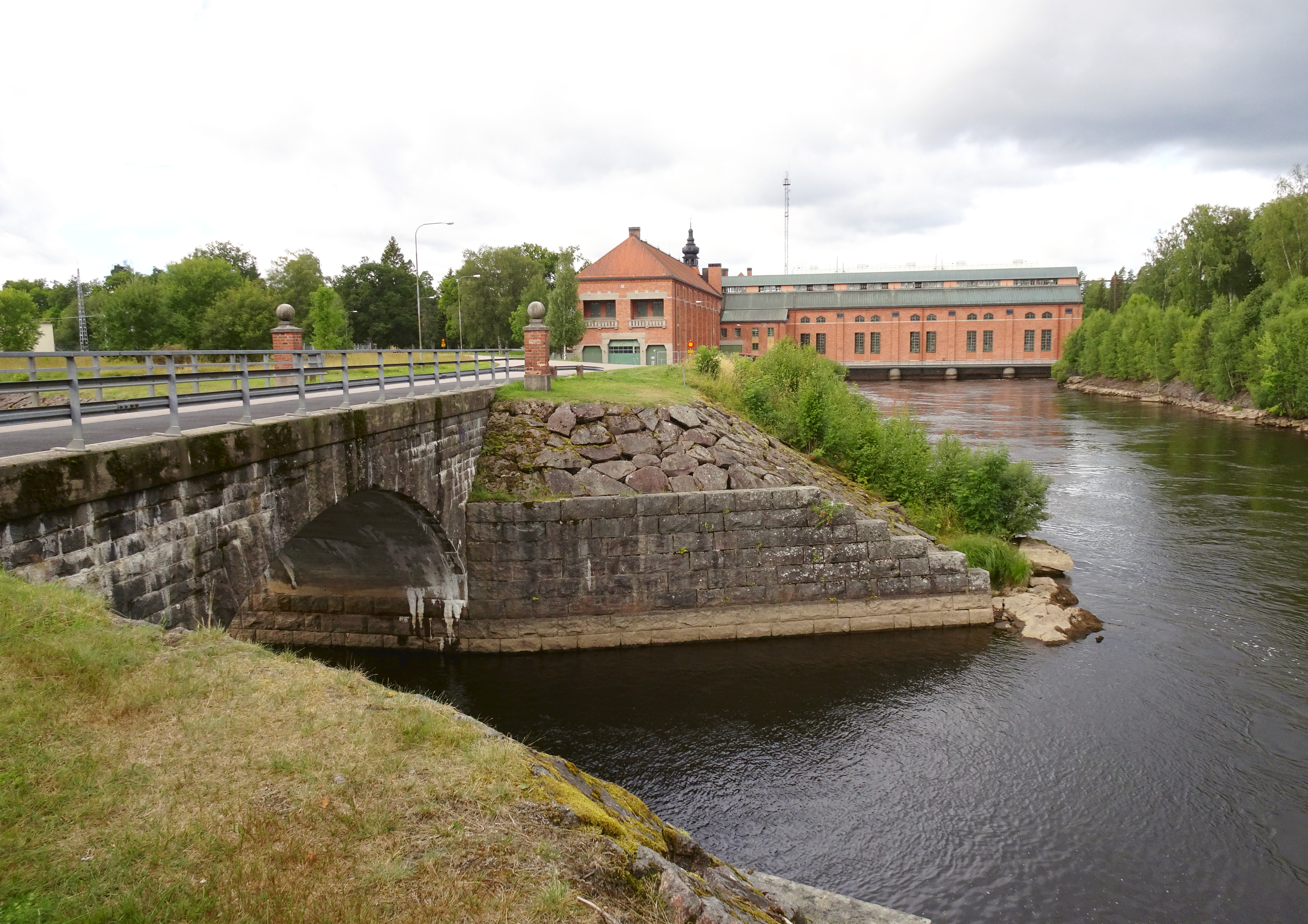
Untra kraftverk (1911–18)

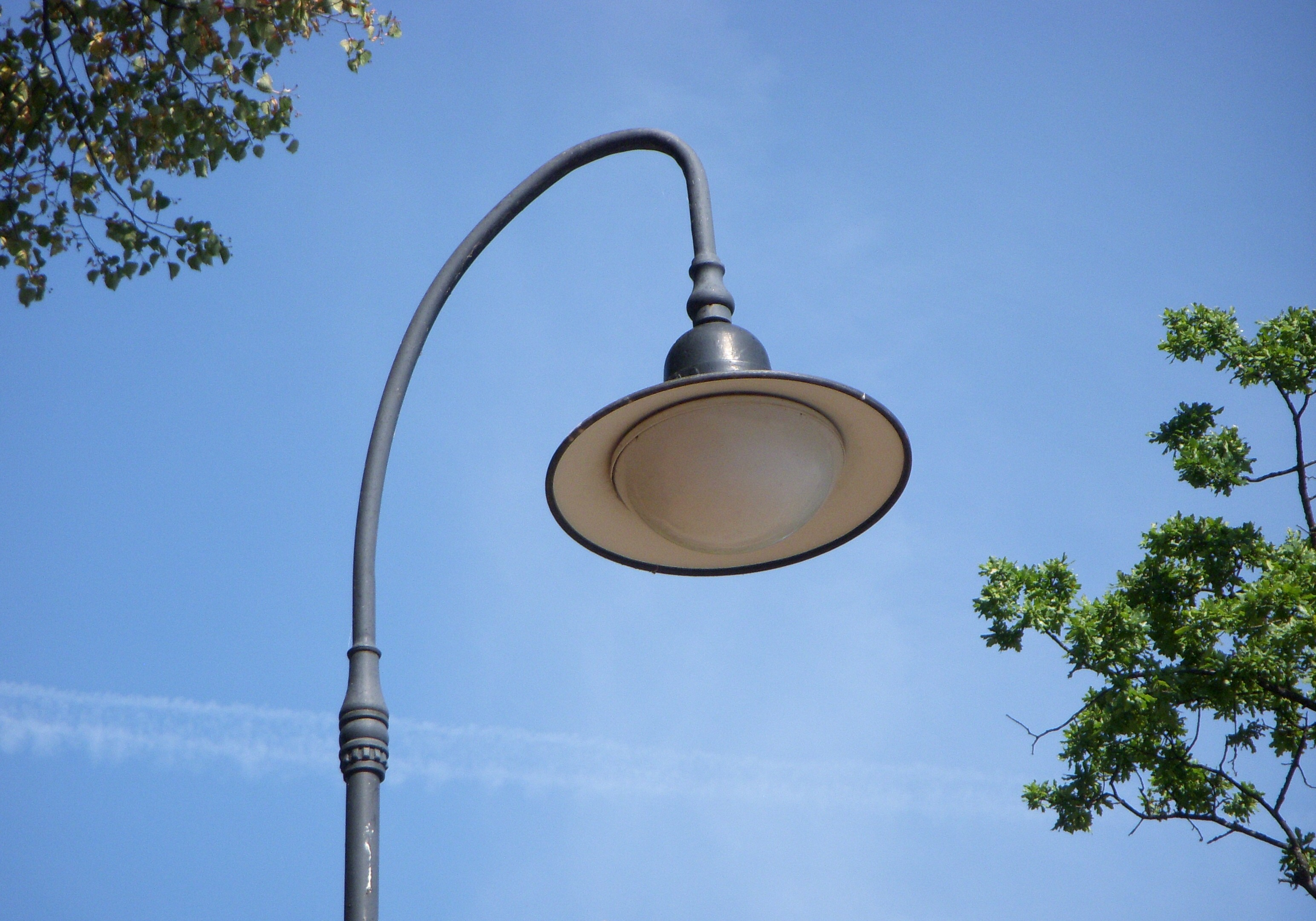
Electric street lamp (1920)

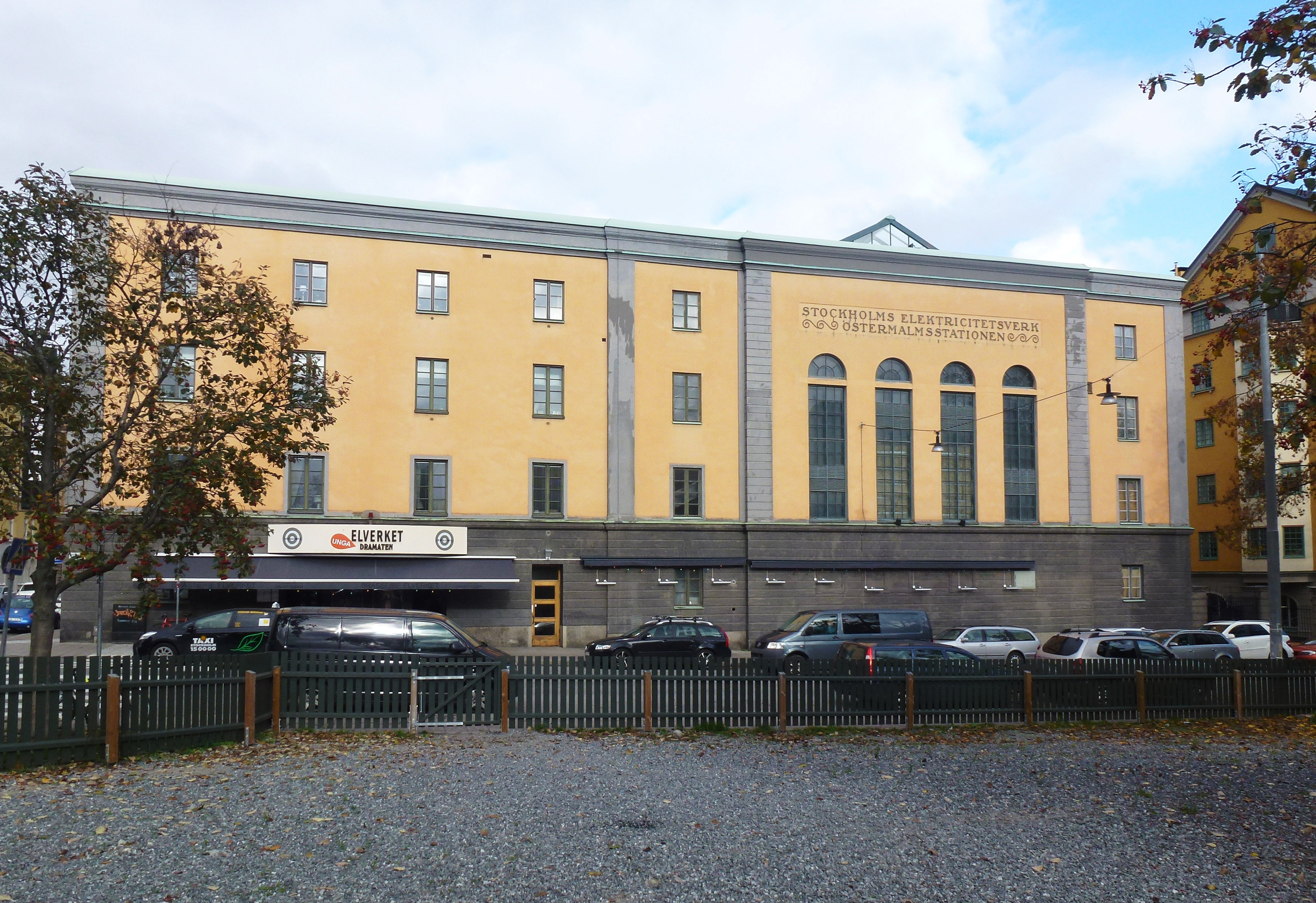
Östermalmsstationen, Stockholm (1923–25)

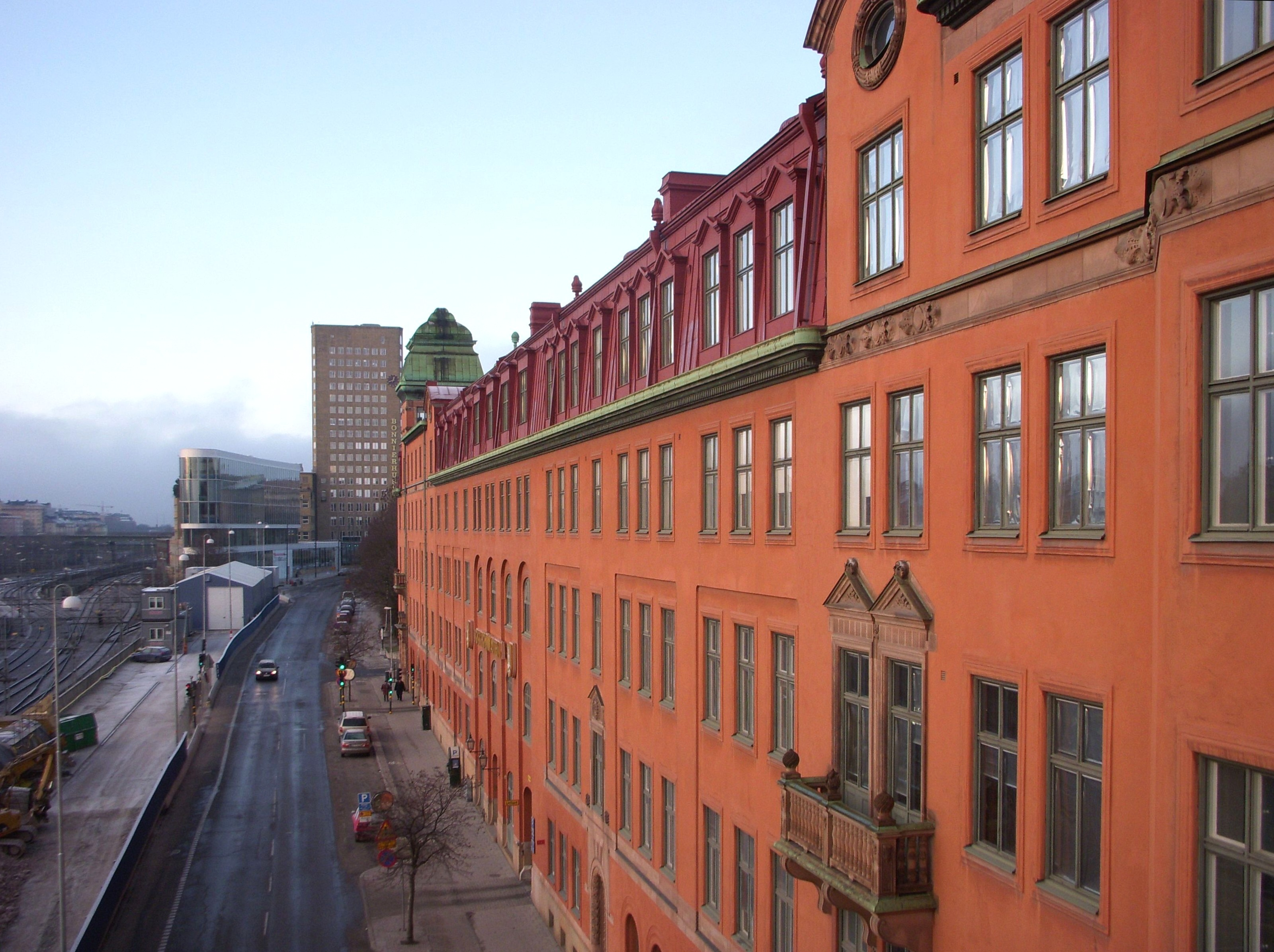
Stockholms gasverk, now Stockholm Vatten (together with F. Boberg, 1906)

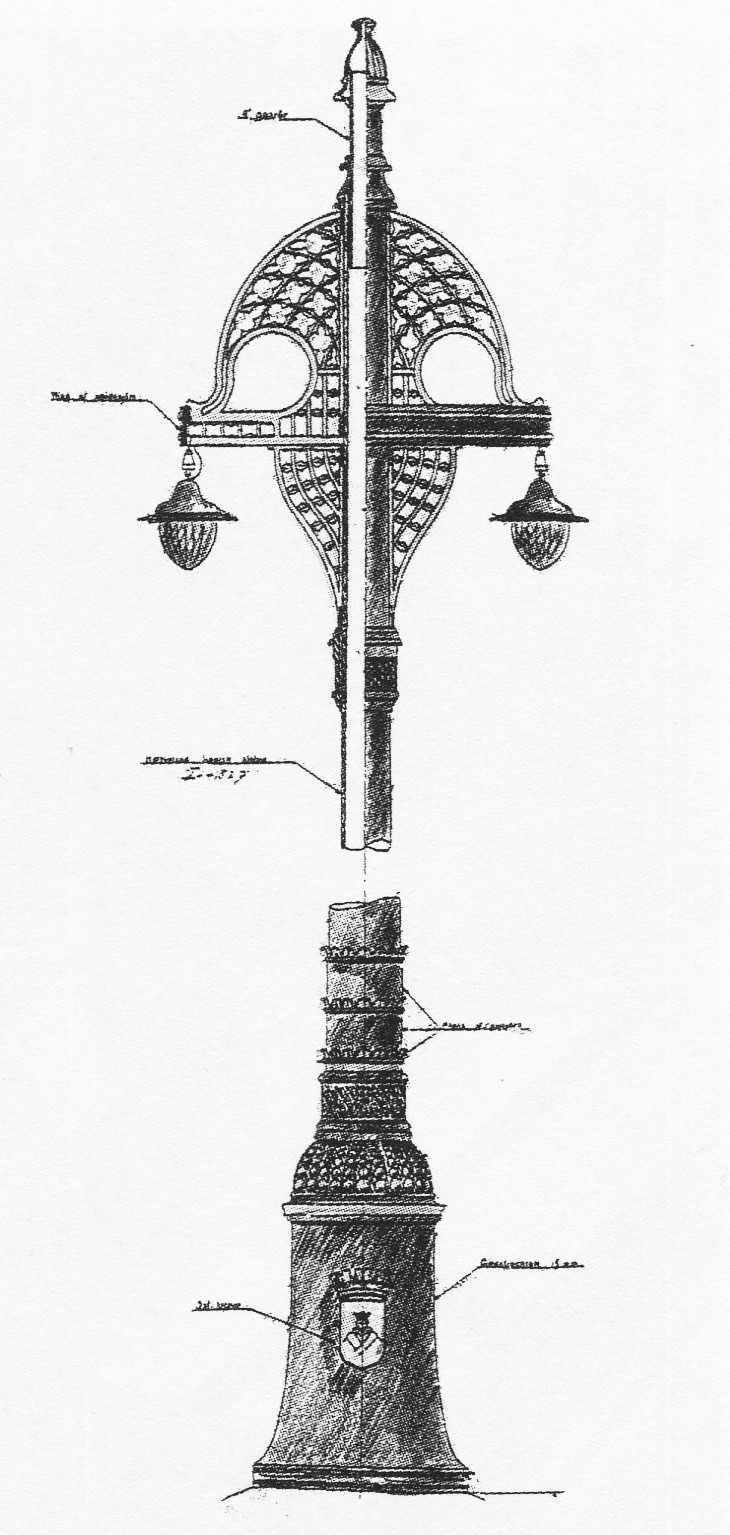
Drawing for Norrmalmstorg's lighting poles, 1911

== Sources ==
- Björn Hallerdt (redaktör) (1992). Stockholms tekniska historia, del V. Ljus kraft värma. Stockholm monographs. ISBN 91-7031-035-1
- Stahre, Nils-Gustaf; Fogelström, Per Anders (1986). Stockholms gatunamn: innerstaden. Monographs published by the City of Stockholm. Stockholm: Liber/Allmänna förlaget. ISBN 91-38-90777-1
- Andersson, Henrik O.; Bedoire, Fredric (1977) [1973]. Stockholms byggnader: en bok om arkitektur och stadsbild i Stockholm (3). Stockholm: Prisma. ISBN 91-518-1125-1
