= Åke =

Swedish masculine given name

- Pronunciation: Swedish: [ˈǒːkɛ]
- Gender: Male
- Language: medieval Germanic, Sweden
- Name day: May 8 (Sweden)

Origin
- Meaning: from ano, "ancestor"

Other names
- See also: Åge, Aage

Åke is a masculine Swedish given name, possibly derived from the medieval Germanic name Anicho, derived from ano meaning "ancestor". In Sweden, May 8 is the Name day for Åke. There are variant spellings, including the Danish/Norwegian Åge or Aage. Åke is uncommon as a surname. People with the name Åke include:

- Åke Åkerström (1902–1991), Swedish archaeologist and classical scholar
- Åke Andersson (1906–1982), Swedish footballer
- Åke Andersson (1917–1983), Swedish footballer
- Åke Andersson (1918–1982), Swedish ice hockey player, footballer, bandy player, and coach
- Åke Andersson (1925–2005), Swedish long-distance runner
- Åke Andersson (born 1936), Swedish speedway rider
- Åke Backström (1919–2005), Finnish diplomat
- Åke Bergman (1896–1941), Swedish swimmer
- Åke Bergqvist (1900–1975), Swedish Olympic sailor
- Åke Berntsson (1934–2016), Swedish rower
- Åke Bonnier (born 1957), Swedish Bishop
- Åke Borg (1901–1973), Swedish swimmer
- Åke Call (born 1942), Swedish sports shooter
- Åke Carlsson (1936–2007), Swedish wrestler
- Åke Claesson (1889–1967), Swedish actor
- Åke Dahlqvist (1901–1991), Swedish cinematographer
- Åke Edwardson (born 1953), Swedish author of detective fiction, and a professor at Gothenburg University
- Åke Ekman (1912–1965), Finnish speed skater
- Åke Gerhard Ekstrand (1846–1933), Swedish chemist and public servant
- Åke Eliaeson (1923–2015), Swedish tennis player
- Åke Ericson (born 1962), Swedish photojournalist and documentary photographer
- Åke Ericson (1913–1986), Swedish ice hockey player
- Åke Falck (1925–1974), Swedish film director
- Åke Fiskerstrand (born 1948), Norwegian rower
- Åke Fjästad (1887–1956), Swedish footballer
- Åke Fridell (1919–1985), Swedish film actor
- Åke Gartz (1888–1974), Finnish politician
- Åke Gerhard (1921–2009), Swedish songwriter
- Åke Green (born 1941), Swedish Pentecostal Christian pastor
- Åke Grönberg (1914–1969), Swedish actor
- Åke Grönhagen (1885–1974), Swedish pentathlete and fencer
- Åke Grönlund, Swedish table tennis player
- Åke Gustafsson (1908–1988), Swedish botanist and geneticist
- Åke Häger (1897–1968), Swedish Olympic gymnast
- Åke Hallgren (1918–2005), Swedish triple jumper
- Åke Hallman (1912–1973), Swedish footballer
- Åke Hammarskjöld (1893–1937), Swedish lawyer and diplomat
- Åke Hansson (1903–1981), Swedish footballer
- Åke Hansson (1927–2015), Swedish footballer
- Åke Hedberg (1929–1971), Swedish weightlifter
- Åke Hedvall (1910–1969), Swedish discus thrower
- Åke Hellman (1915–2017), Finnish centenarian, art professor and painter
- Åke Hodell (1919–2000), Swedish fighter pilot, poet, author, text-sound composer, and artist
- Åke Hök (1889–1963), Swedish Army officer and horse rider
- Åke Holmberg (1907–1991), Swedish writer and translator
- Åke Hultberg (born 1949), Swedish equestrian
- Åke Jansson (1916–1998), Swedish long-distance runner
- Åke Jensen (1912–1993), Swedish actor and singer
- Åke Jönsson (1925–1998), Swedish footballer
- Åke Jonsson (1919–2007), Swedish diplomat
- Åke Jonsson (born 1942), Swedish motocross racer
- Åke Johansson (1928–2014), Swedish footballer
- Åke Julin (1919–2008), Swedish water polo player
- Åke Karlsson (1911–1958), Finnish boxer
- Åke Kastlund (1916–1999), Swedish prelate
- Åke Kromnow (1914–1986), Swedish archivist
- Åke Larsson (1931–2017), Swedish footballer
- Åke Lassas (1924–2009), Swedish ice hockey player
- Åke Lindblom (1919–1992), Swedish sports shooter
- Åke Lindemalm (1910–2004), Swedish Navy officer
- Åke Lindman (formerly Åke Järvinen) (1928–2009), Finnish director and actor
- Åke Lindström (1928–2002), Swedish actor and film director
- Åke Lundeberg (1888–1939), Swedish sport shooter
- Åke Lundqvist (1936–2021), Swedish actor
- Åke Mangård (1917–1998), Swedish Air Force major general
- Åke Nauman (1908–1995), Swedish Olympic water polo player
- Åke Nilsson (1927–1991), Swedish alpine skier
- Åke Nilsson (1937–2005), Swedish sprint canoeist
- Åke Nilsson (born 1945), Swedish javelin thrower
- Åke Nilsson (born 1982), Swedish golfer
- Åke Nordin (1936–2013), Swedish entrepreneur
- Åke Öberg (born 1937), Swedish professor
- Åke Ödmark (1916–1994), Swedish high jumper
- Åke Ohberg (1905–1975), Swedish actor and film director
- Åke Ohlmarks (1911–1984), Swedish author, translator, and scholar
- Åke Olivestedt (1924–1998), Swedish cyclist
- Åke Olsson (1934–2009), Swedish chess player
- Åke Olsson, Swedish footballer
- Åke Ortmark (1929–2018), Swedish journalist, author and radio and television presenter
- Åke Parmerud (born 1953), Swedish electroacoustic music composer
- Åke Persson (1932–1975), Swedish jazz trombonist
- Åke Pettersson (1926–2000), Finnish footballer
- Åke Pettersson, Swedish footballer
- Åke Pleijel (1913–1989), Swedish mathematician
- Åke Pousette (born 1949), Swedish andrologist
- Åke Rakell (1935–2012), Swedish table tennis player
- Åke Rusck (1912–1977), Swedish businessman
- Åke Rydberg (born 1938), Swedish ice hockey player and footballer
- Åke Sagrén (1935–2022), Swedish Army officer
- Åke Samuelsson (1913–1995), Swedish footballer
- Åke Sandgren (born 1955), Swedish-Danish film director and screenwriter
- Åke Sandin (born 1944), Swedish sprint canoer
- Åke Sellström (born 1948), Swedish academic and arms specialist
- Åke Senning (1915–2000), Swedish cardiac surgeon
- Åke Seyffarth (1919–1998), Swedish speed skater
- Åke W. Sjöberg (1924–2014), Swedish Assyriologist
- Åke Sjölin (1910–1999), Swedish diplomat
- Åke Skyttevall (born 1956), Swedish basketball player
- Åke Söderblom (1910–1965), Swedish actor, screenwriter, and songwriter
- Åke Söderlund (1925–2002), Swedish racewalking athlete
- Åke Stenborg (1926–2010), Swedish chess player
- Åke Stenqvist (1914–2006), Swedish sprinter and long jumper
- Åke V. Ström (1909–1994), Swedish theologian
- Åke Strömmer (1936–2005), Swedish sports journalist, radio presenter, and television host
- Åke Sundborg (1921–2007), Swedish geomorphologist and hydrologist
- Åke Svenson (born 1953), Swedish middle-distance runner
- Åke Thelning (1892–1979), Swedish Olympic horse rider
- Åke Henriksson Tott (1598–1640), Swedish soldier and politician
- Åke Uddén (1903–1987), Swedish violist, composer, conductor, and music educator
- Åke Wallenquist (1904–1994), Swedish astronomer
- Åke Wärnström (1925–2018), Swedish boxer
- Åke Wihtol (1924–2002), Finnish lawyer and politician
- Karl-Åke Asph (born 1939), Swedish Olympic cross country skier
- Bengt-Åke Gustafsson (born 1958), retired Swedish ice hockey player, now head coach of the Swedish national ice hockey team
- Lars-Åke Lagrell (1940–2020), Swedish sports personality; President of the Swedish Football Association
- Sven-Åke Lundbäck (born 1948), Swedish Olympic cross-country skier
