= Åge =

Åge is a Norwegian masculine given name. Variants include the Danish/Norwegian Aage and the Swedish Åke. People with the name Åge include:

- Åge Aleksandersen (born 1949), Norwegian singer, songwriter and guitarist
- Åge Austheim (born 1983), Norwegian politician
- Åge Danielsen (born 1942), Norwegian civil servant
- Åge Ellingsen (born 1962), Norwegian ice hockey player
- Åge Bernhard Grutle (born 1952), Norwegian diplomat and royal servant
- Åge Hadler (born 1944), Norwegian orienteering competitor
- Åge Hareide (1953–2025), Norwegian football player and coach
- Åge Hovengen (1927–2018), Norwegian politician for the Labour Party
- Åge Konradsen (born 1954), Norwegian politician for the Conservative Party
- Åge Korsvold (born 1946), Norwegian businessperson and CEO of Kistefos
- Åge Lundström (1890–1975), Swedish Air Force general and horse rider
- Åge Maridal (born 1965), Norwegian footballer
- Åge Nigardsøy (1954–2008), Norwegian organizational leader and disability rights activist
- Åge Sten Nilsen (born 1969) Norwegian hard rock singer
- Åge Nordkild (1951–2015), Norwegian politician
- Åge Ramberg (1921–1991), Norwegian politician for the Christian Democratic Party
- Åge Rønning (1925–1991), Norwegian writer and journalist
- Åge Samuelsen (1915–1987), Norwegian Christian preacher and singer/artist
- Åge Sørensen (1937–2022), Norwegian footballer
- Åge Spydevold (1925–1982), Norwegian footballer
- Åge Starheim (born 1946), Norwegian politician for the Progress Party
- Åge Steen (born 1960), Norwegian football manager
- Åge Storhaug (1938–2012), Norwegian gymnast
- Åge Vedel Tåning (1890–1958), Danish ichthyologist
- Åge Tovan (born 1947), Norwegian politician for the Labour Party
- Hans Åge Yndestad (born 1980), Norwegian footballer
- Jan Åge Fjørtoft (born 1967), former Norwegian footballer
- Jon Åge Tyldum (born 1968), former Norwegian biathlete
- Per-Åge Skrøder (born 1978), Norwegian ice hockey player
- Rolf Åge Berg (born 1957), Norwegian ski jumper
- Tor Åge Bringsværd (1939–2025), author, playwright, editor and translator
