= Age =

Age or AGE may refer to:

== Time and its effects ==
- Age, the amount of time an individual has been alive or an object has existed
  - East Asian age reckoning, an Asian system of marking age starting at 1
- Ageing or aging, the process of becoming older
  - Senescence, the gradual deterioration of biological function with age
  - Human development (biology)
- Periodization, the process of categorizing the past into discrete named blocks of time
  - Ages of Man, the stages of human existence on the Earth according to Greek mythology and its subsequent Roman interpretation
  - Prehistoric age

== Arts, entertainment, and media ==
=== Periodicals ===
- Age (journal), a scientific journal on ageing, now named GeroScience
- The Age, a newspaper in Melbourne, Australia
- The Age, a nineteenth-century American newspaper edited by Melville Fuller
- The New York Age, African-American newspaper from 1887 to 1960

=== Other media ===
- Ages, worlds in the Myst video game series
- "Age" (song), by Jim and Ingrid Croce

== Businesses and organizations ==
- âge, a Japanese media company
- Agricultural & General Engineers or AGE, a group of engineering companies
- Alternativa Galega de Esquerda or AGE, the Galician Left Alternative, a political party in Spain
- American Aging Association or AGE, an organization for aging studies
- Associated Gas and Electric, a defunct American power company from New York

== Languages ==
- East Angal language (ISO-639: age)
- Esimbi language or Age, a language of the Cameroons

== People ==
- Åge, a given name
- Aage, a given name
- Agenore Incrocci, an Italian screenwriter

== Places ==
- Wangerooge Airfield, in Lower Saxony, Germany (IATA airport code AGE)

== Science and technology ==
=== Biology and medicine ===
- Age (genus), a genus of moth
- Arterial gas embolism or AGE, a blood vessel blockage caused by gas bubbles
- Advanced glycation end-products or AGEs, proteins or lipids that become glycated as a result of exposure to sugars

=== Other sciences ===
- Age (geology)
- Age (model theory), an aspect of mathematical model theory
- Applied general equilibrium or AGE, a model in mathematical economics

== Other uses ==
- Agé, a god of the Fon people of Africa

== See also ==
- AG (disambiguation)
- Ages (disambiguation)
- Age of Aquarius (disambiguation)
- Ageism, discrimination against individuals or groups on the basis of their age
- Aging (disambiguation)
- AIG (disambiguation)
- Golden age (disambiguation)
- New Age (disambiguation)
