= Aage =

Danish masculine given name

Aage is a Danish masculine given name and a less common spelling of the Norwegian given name Åge. Variants include the Swedish name Åke. People with the name Aage include:

== First name ==
- Count Aage of Rosenborg (1887–1940), Danish prince and officer of the French Foreign Legion
- Aage Bendixen (1887–1973), Danish actor
- Aage Berntsen (1885–1952), Danish Olympic fencer, doctor writer and artist
- Aage Bertelsen (1873–1945), Danish painter
- Aage Birch (1926–2017), Danish sailor
- Aage Bohr (1922–2009), Danish nuclear physicist and Nobel laureate, son of Niels Bohr
- Aage Borchgrevink (born 1969), Norwegian writer and literary critic
- Aage Brix (1894–1963), American soccer player
- Aage Dons (1903–1993), Danish writer
- Aage Emborg (1883–1953), Danish composer
- Aage Eriksen (1917–1998), Norwegian wrestler and Olympic medallist in Greco-Roman wrestling
- Aage Fønss (1887–1976), Danish opera singer and actor
- Aage Fahrenholtz (1901–1990), Danish boxer
- Aage Foss (1885–1952), Danish film actor
- Aage Frandsen (1890–1968), Danish gymnast
- Aage Friis (1870–1949), Danish historian and professor
- Aage Giødesen (1863–1939), Danish painter
- Aage Grundstad (1923–2012), Norwegian accordion player
- Aage Høy-Petersen (1898–1967), Danish sailor
- Aage Hansen (1935–2023), Norwegian speedway rider
- Aage Haugland (1944–2000), Danish operatic bass
- Aage Heimann (1900–1956), Danish field hockey player
- Aage Hermann (1888–1949), Danish author and journalist
- Aage Hertel (1873–1944), Danish actor
- Aage Ingerslev (1933–2003), Danish chess player
- Aage Jørgensen (gymnast) (1900–1972), Danish gymnast
- Aage Jørgensen (1903–1967), Danish footballer
- Aage Jepsen Sparre (1460–1540), Danish priest, archbishop of Lund 1523–1532
- Aage Jensen (1915–1995), Danish coxswain
- Aage Rou Jensen (1924–2009), Danish footballer
- Aage Kirkegaard (1914–1992), Danish field hockey player
- Aage Kjelstrup, Norwegian racing cyclist
- Aage Krarup Nielsen (1891–1972), travel writer
- Aage Kvalbein (born 1947), Norwegian cellist and a professor in cello at the Norwegian Academy of Music
- Aage Langeland-Mathiesen (1868–1933), Danish architect
- Aage Larsen (1923–2016), Danish rower
- Aage Leidersdorff (1910–1970), Danish Olympic fencer
- Aage Lundvald (1908–1983), Danish illustrator, cartoonist, and composer
- Aage Møller (1932–2022), American professor of cognition and neuroscience
- Aage Møst (1923–2011), Norwegian journalist and sports official
- Aage Madsen (1883–1937), Danish tennis player
- Aage Marius Hansen (1890–1980), Danish gymnast
- Aage Meyer (1904–1979), Danish wrestler
- Aage Myhrvold (1918–1987), Norwegian cyclist
- Aage Neutzsky-Wulff (1891–1967), Danish writer and poet
- Aage Nielsen-Edwin (1898–1985), Danish sculptor
- Aage Oxenvad (1884–1944), Danish clarinettist
- Aage Poulsen (1919–1998), Danish long-distance runner
- Aage Rasmussen (1889–1983), Danish photographer and track and field athlete
- Aage Redal (1891–1950), Danish stage and film actor
- Aage Rou Jensen (1924–2009), Danish international footballer
- Aage Roussel (1901–1972), Danish archaeologist and historian
- Aage Rubæk-Nielsen (1913–1990), Danish equestrian
- Aage Rundberget (born 1947), Norwegian judge and civil servant
- Aage B. Sørensen (1941–2001), Danish sociologist
- Aage Samuelsen (1915–1987), Norwegian evangelist, singer and composer
- Aage Schavland (1806–1876), Norwegian priest and Member of Parliament
- Aage Skavlan (1847–1920), Norwegian historian
- Aage Steen (1900–1982), Norwegian boxer
- Aage Stentoft (1914–1990), Danish composer, film score composer and theatre director
- Aage Storstein (1900–1983), Norwegian artist
- Aage Tanggaard (born 1957), Danish jazz drummer and record producer
- Aage Teigen (1944–2014), Norwegian jazz musician and economist
- Aage Thaarup (1906–1987), Danish milliner
- Aage Thor Falkanger (born 1965), Norwegian judge and legal scholar
- Aage Thor Falkanger Sr. (1902–1981), Norwegian judge
- Aage Thordal-Christensen (born 1965), Danish dancer, choreographer, and ballet director
- Aage Torgensen (1900–1932), Danish wrestler
- Aage Vestøl (1922–2008), Norwegian chess player
- Aage Walther (1897–1961), Danish gymnast
- Aage William Søgaard (1933–2010), Norwegian trade unionist and politician
- Aage Winther-Jørgensen (1900–1967), Danish actor

== Middle name ==
- Bjørn Aage Ibsen (1915–2007), Danish anesthetist and founder of intensive-care medicine
- Carl Aage Hilbert (1899–1953), Danish Prefect of the Faroe Islands 1936–1945
- Jens Aage Als-Nielsen (born 1937), Danish physicist
- Kai Aage Bruun (1899–1971), Danish music writer, critic and composer
- Kaj Aage Gunnar Strand (1907–2000), Danish astronomer who worked in Denmark and the U.S.A.
- Karl Aage Hansen (1921–1990), Danish football player
- Karl Aage Præst (1922–2011), Danish football player
- Karl Aage Rasmussen (born 1947), Danish composer, writer and organizer
- Knud Aage Nielsen, (born 1937), Danish badminton player
- Nils Aage Jegstad (born 1950), Norwegian politician for the Conservative Party
- Per Aage Brandt (1944–2021), Danish writer, poet, and linguist
- Svend Aage Castella (1890–1938), Danish amateur football (soccer) player
- Svend Aage Jensby (born 1940), Danish politician representing the Liberal Party
- Svend Aage Madsen (born 1939), Danish novelist
- Svend Aage Rask (1935–2020), Danish footballer
- Tom Aage Aarnes (born 1977), Norwegian ski jumper

== See also ==
- Aage Badho (English translation – March Ahead), 1947 Hindi-language Movie directed by Yeshwant Pithkar
- Aage Kadam (English translation – Forward March), 1943 Hindi-language black-and-white Movie directed by N R Acharya
- Aage Ki Soch, 1988 Hindi language movie directed by Dada Kondke
- Aage Kya, 2021 Indian interactive quiz show
