= Åke Pettersson =

Åke Pettersson can refer to:

- Åke Pettersson (Finnish footballer)
- Åke Pettersson (Swedish footballer)
