= Aake =

Aake is a given name. Notable people with the name include:

- Aake Kalliala (born 1950), Finnish actor
- Aake Anker Ording (1899–1979), Norwegian civil servant and politician

== See also ==
- Aage
- Aake (film), Indian film
