= Kai Aage Bruun =

Danish composer and writer

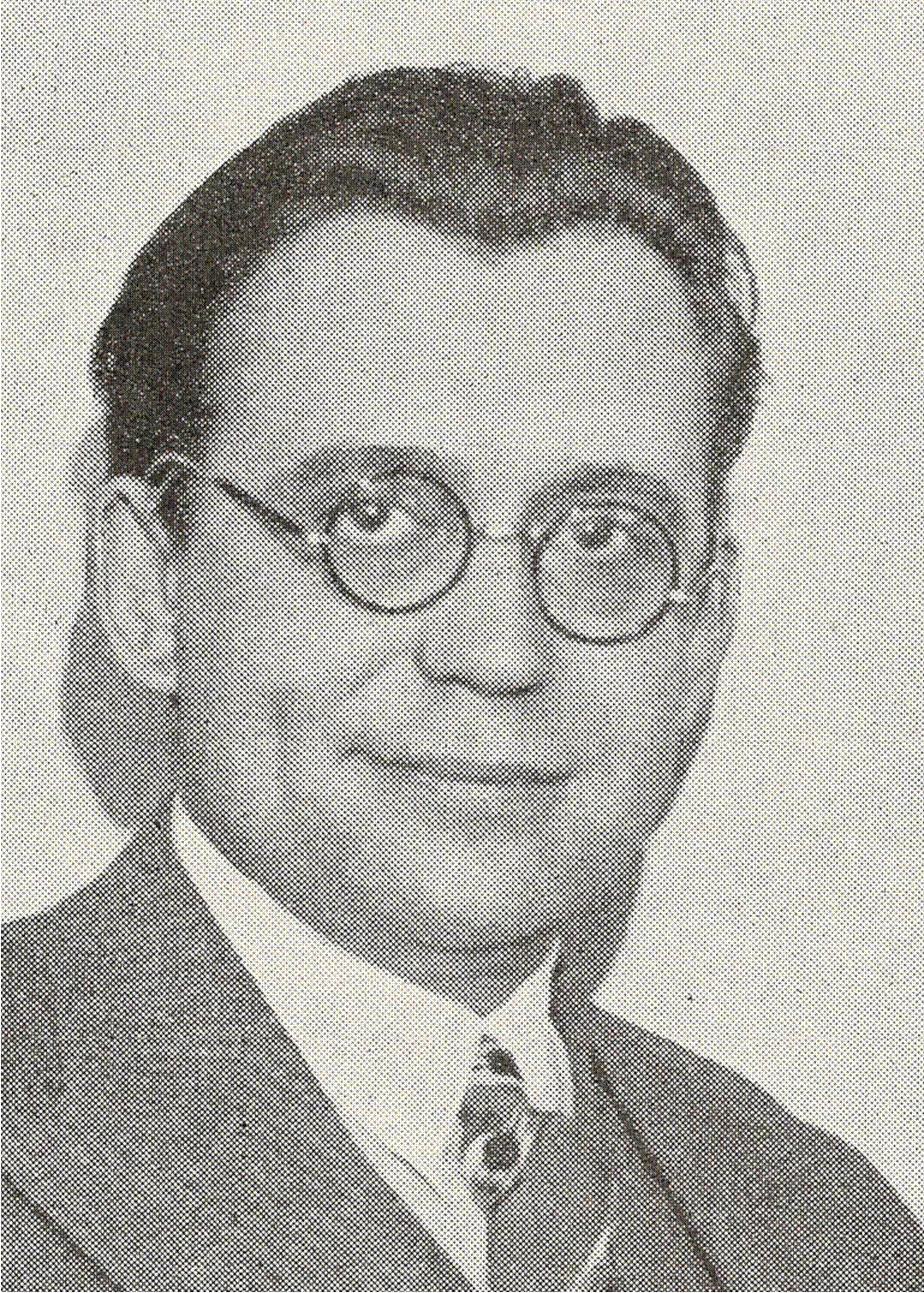

Kai Aage Bruun (23 January 1899 – 11 May 1971) was a Danish music writer, critic and composer.

Bruun grew up in a musical home. His father was cellist in The Royal Chapel and was educated by The Royal Danish Academy of Music. His mother was the sister of composers Roger Henrichsen and Edgar Henrichsen and Kai Aage was thus cousin to jazz pianist Børge Roger-Henrichsen. Bruun began to play cello at the age of just 6, and in 1917 studied music in Leipzig. He was also involved in the practical music scene: in 1925 as co-founder of Student Musikforeningen where he directed a couple of years, 1926-1927 as conductor of the Student Sangforeningen and later, 1930-1931 as conductor of the Academic Orchestra. In addition, he worked as a music critic and assistant to Music History Museum.

In 1927 he had, however, been employed by DR, Denmark's national broadcasting station as the program secretary, and thus began a 30-year association with a medium where his abilities as a music facilitator came to full expression through numerous lectures and broadcasts. In 1949, he was deputy head of its music department and he worked a dozen years as a music consultant.

In 1969 published his principal Danish music history but he had previously written other musical works. Notably The Life and Works (1928),Three Composers (about Haydn, Kuhlau, Carl Nielsen - 1932), Basic Concepts of Music (1942), Music Dictionary (1943), Chamber music from Haydn to the young Beethoven (1960) and Chamber Music from Beethoven to Schubert (1962) in addition to numerous articles in magazines and newspapers.

As a composer, his work was limited to a number of choir and romantic pieces as well as some analysis of chamber music from the 18th century.
