= Spydevold =

Spydevold is a surname. Notable people with the surname include:

- Åge Spydevold (1925–1982), Norwegian footballer
- Bjørn Spydevold (1918–2002), Norwegian footballer
- Thor Spydevold (1944–2024), Norwegian footballer
