= Nordkild =

Nordkild is a surname. Notable people with the surname include:

- Åge Nordkild (1951–2015), Norwegian politician
- Ivar Nordkild (born 1941), Norwegian biathlete
