= Patina =

Change of object's surface through age and exposure

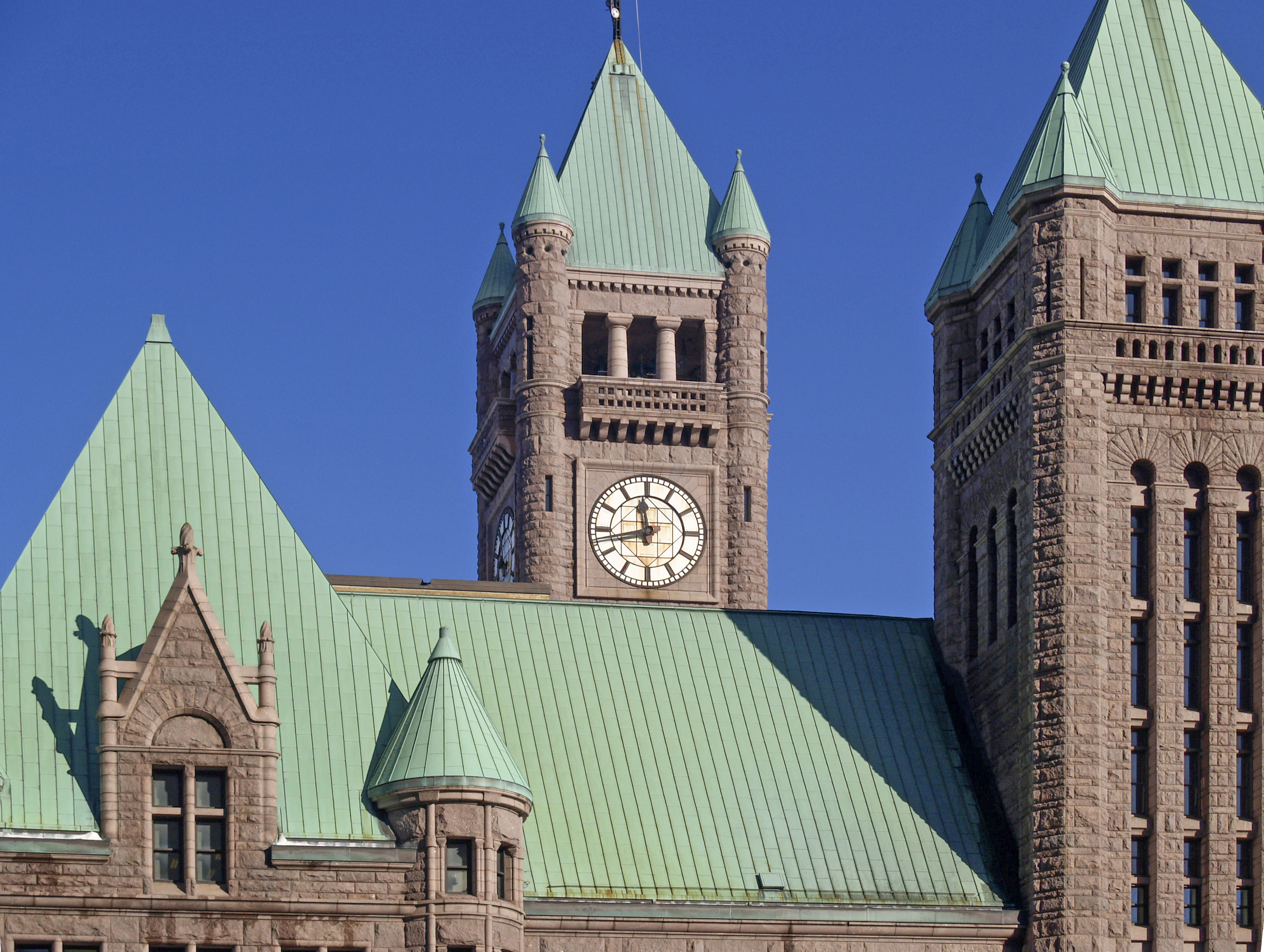
Copper roof on the Minneapolis City Hall, coated with patina

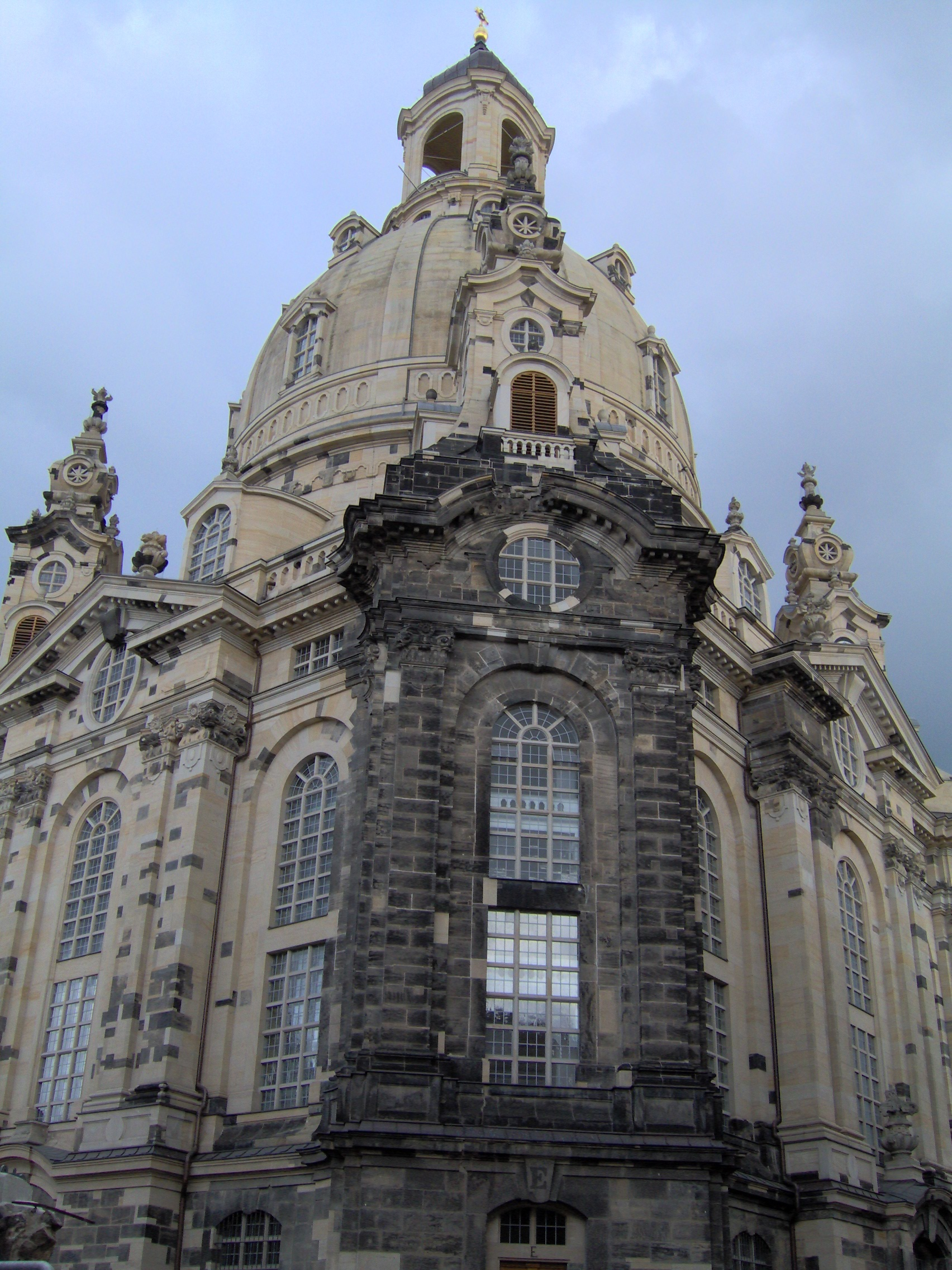
The Dresden Frauenkirche. The church was destroyed during the bombing of Dresden in 1945 and rebuilt from 1993 to 2005 with new material; the stones with the black patina are the parts that survived the firebombing from the original 18th-century church.

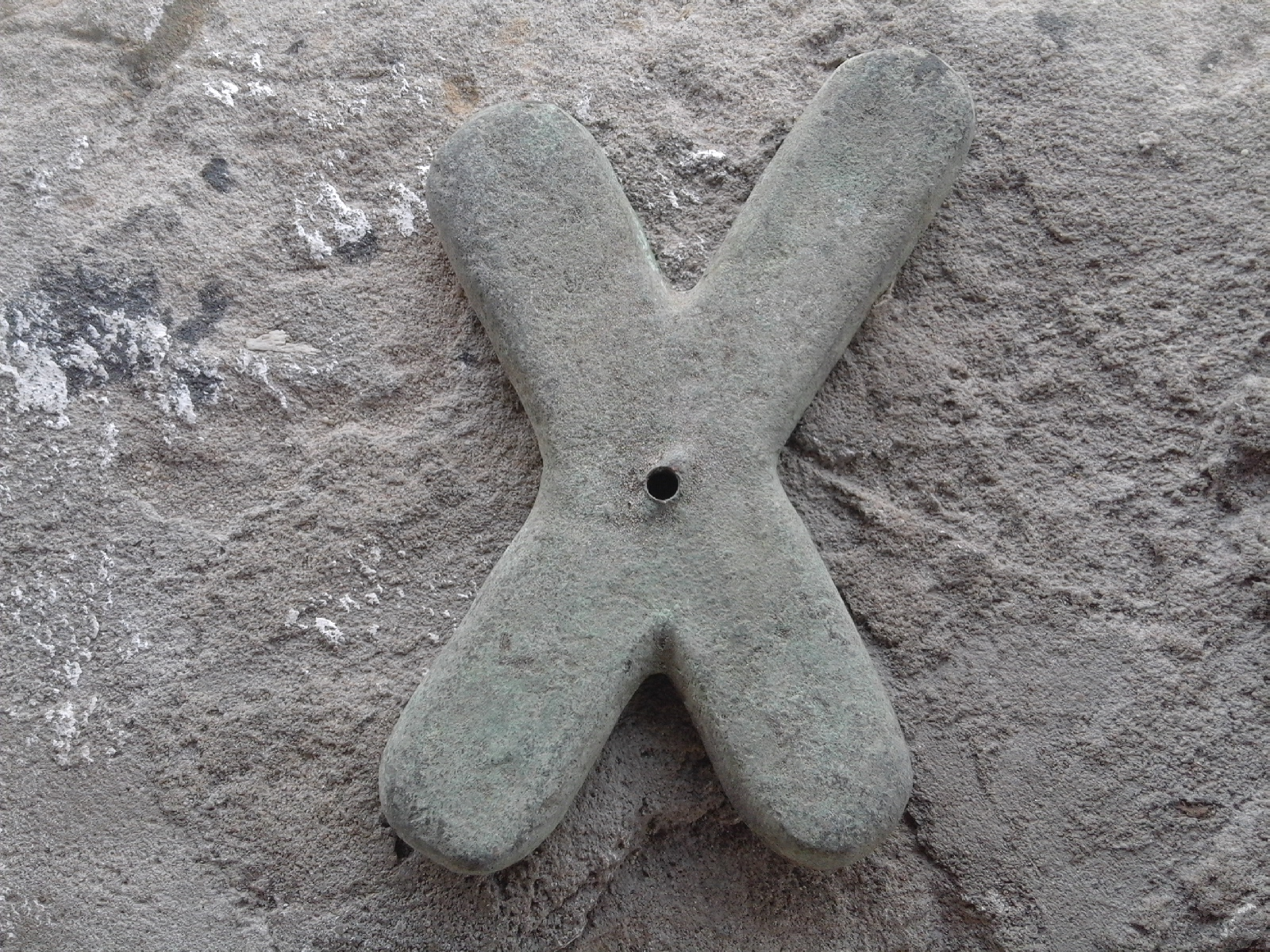
Pre-colonial copper coin formerly used in the Copper Belt (Democratic Republic of the Congo and Zambia). The external layer has been weathered by moisture and rain, leading to the oxidation of copper.

Patina (/pəˈtiːnə/ pə-TEE-nə, or /ˈpætɪnə/ PAT-ih-nə) is a thin layer that variously forms on the surface of copper, brass, bronze, and similar metals and alloys (tarnish produced by oxidation or other chemical processes), or certain stones and wooden furniture (sheen produced by age, wear, and polishing), or any similar acquired change of a surface through age and exposure.

Additionally, the term is used to describe the aging of high-quality leather. The patinas on leather goods are unique to the type of leather, frequency of use, and exposure.

Patinas can provide a protective covering to materials that would otherwise be damaged by corrosion or weathering. They may also be aesthetically appealing.

== Usage ==
On metal, patina is a coating of various chemical compounds such as oxides, carbonates, sulfides, or sulfates formed on the surface during exposure to atmospheric elements (oxygen, rain, acid rain, carbon dioxide, sulfur-bearing compounds). Patina also refers to accumulated changes in surface texture and color that result from normal use of an object such as a coin or a piece of furniture over time.

Archaeologists also use the term patina to refer to a corticated layer that develops over time that is due to a range of complex factors on flint tools and ancient stone monuments. This has led stone tool analysts in recent times to generally prefer the term cortification as a better term to describe the process than patination.

In geology and geomorphology, the term patina is used to refer to discolored film or thin outer layer produced either on or within the surface of a rock or other material by either the development of a weathering rind within the surface of a rock, the formation of desert varnish on the surface of a rock, or combination of both. It also refers to development as the result of weathering of a case-hardened layer, called cortex by geologists, within the surface of either a flint or chert nodule.

== Etymology ==
The word patina comes from the Italian patina (shallow layer of deposit on a surface), derived from the Latin patĭna (pan, shallow dish). Figuratively, patina can refer to any fading, darkening, or other signs of age, which are felt to be natural or unavoidable (or both).

The chemical process by which a patina forms or is deliberately induced is called patination, and a work of art coated by a patina is said to be patinated.

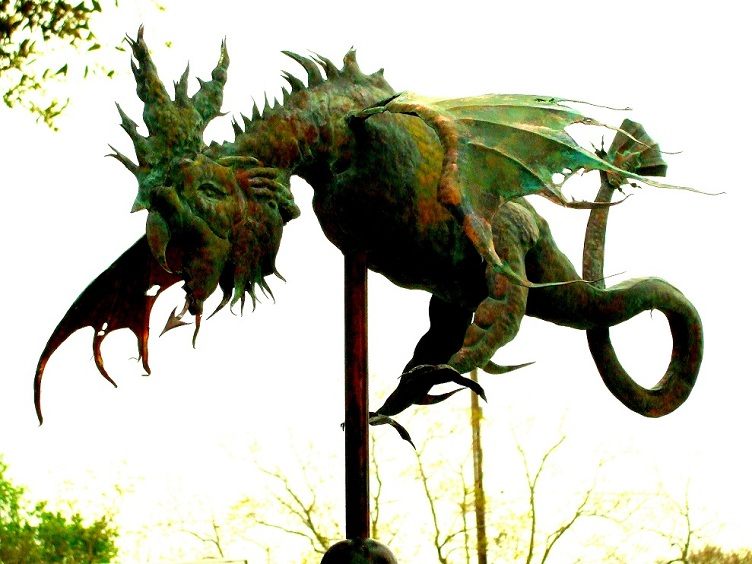
Copper weather vane with verdigris patina

== Acquired patina ==
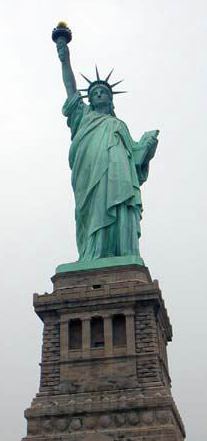
The Statue of Liberty gets its famous green color from the natural patina formed on its copper surface.

The green patina that forms naturally on copper and bronze, sometimes called verdigris, usually consists of varying mixtures of copper chlorides, sulfides, sulfates, and carbonates, depending upon environmental conditions such as sulfur-containing acid rain. In clean air rural environments, the patina is created by the slow chemical reaction of copper with carbon dioxide and water, producing a basic copper carbonate. In industrial and urban air environments containing sulfurous acid rain from coal-fired power plants or industrial processes, the final patina is primarily composed of sulphide or sulphate compounds.

A patina layer takes many years to develop under natural weathering. Buildings in damp coastal or marine environments will develop patina layers faster than ones in dry inland areas.

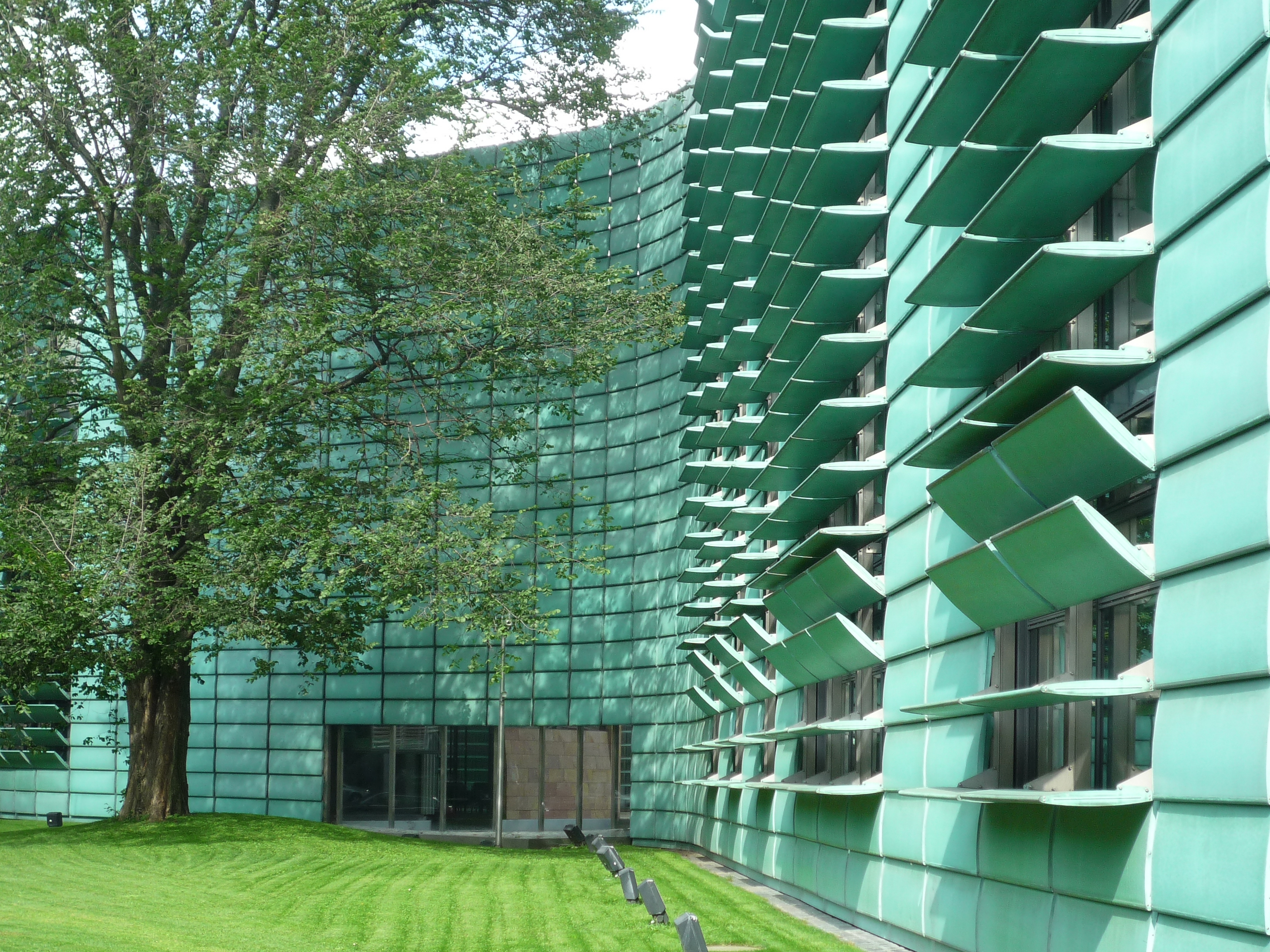
Natural copper patina at the Nordic Embassies (Berlin)

Façade cladding (copper cladding; copper wall cladding) with alloys of copper, like brass or bronze, will weather differently from "pure" copper cladding. Even a lasting gold colour is possible with copper-alloy cladding, for example Bristol Beacon in Bristol, or the Novotel at Paddington Central, London.

Antique and well-used firearms will often develop a layer of rust on the action, barrel, or other steel parts after the original finish has worn. On this subject gunsmith Mark Novak says "... This is what everybody calls patina, I call it a nice thick coat of rust..." The removal of such rust is often necessary for a firearm conservation to prevent further decay of the firearm.

== Applied patina ==
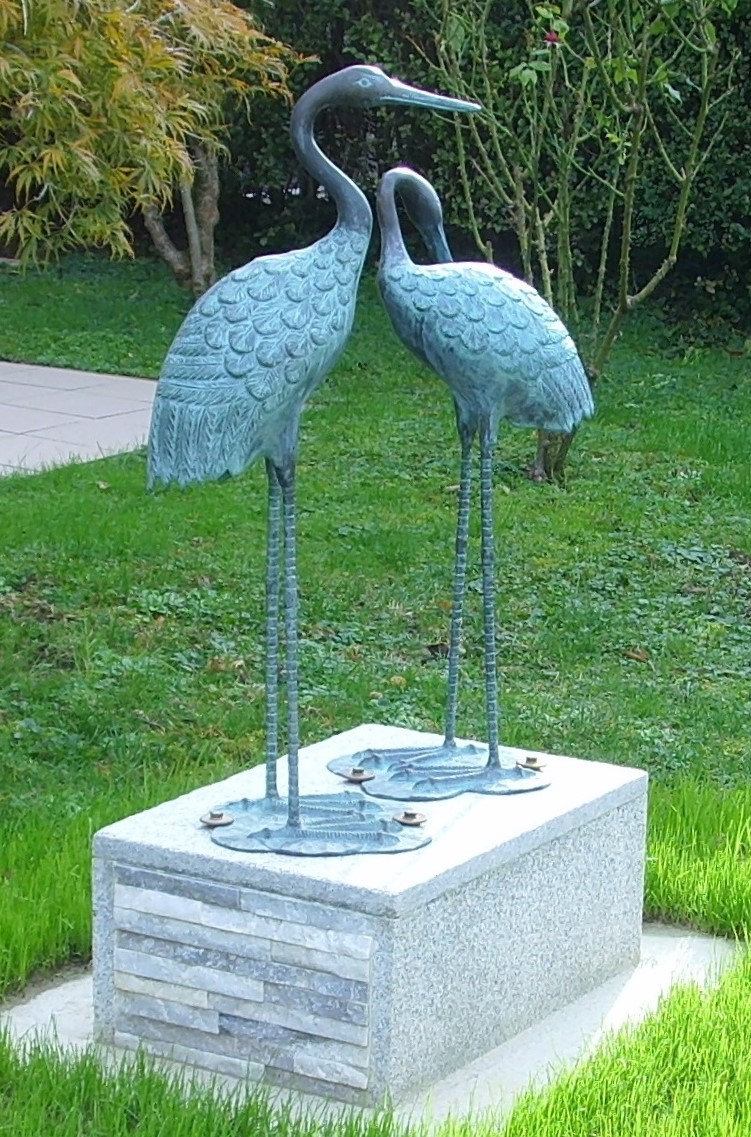
The statue of cranes got its turquoise color from the applied patina on its bronze surface.

Artists and metalworkers often deliberately add patinas as a part of the original design and decoration of art and furniture, or to simulate antiquity in newly made objects. The process is often called distressing.

A wide range of chemicals, both household and commercial, can give a variety of patinas. They are often used by artists as surface embellishments either for color, texture, or both. Patination composition varies with the reacted elements and these will determine the color of the patina. For copper alloys, such as bronze, exposure to chlorides leads to green, while sulfur compounds (such as "liver of sulfur") tend to brown. The basic palette for patinas on copper alloys includes chemicals like ammonium sulfide (blue-black), liver of sulfur (brown-black), cupric nitrate (blue-green), and ferric nitrate (yellow-brown). For artworks, patination is often deliberately accelerated by applying chemicals with heat. Colors range from matte sandstone yellow to deep blues, greens, whites, reds, and various blacks. Some patina colors are achieved by the mixing of colors from the reaction with the metal surface with pigments added to the chemicals. Sometimes the surface is enhanced by waxing, oiling, or other types of lacquers or clear-coats. More simply, the French sculptor Auguste Rodin used to instruct assistants at his studio to urinate over bronzes stored in the outside yard. A patina can be produced on copper by the application of vinegar (acetic acid). This patina is water-soluble and will not last on the outside of a building like a "true" patina. It is usually used as pigment.

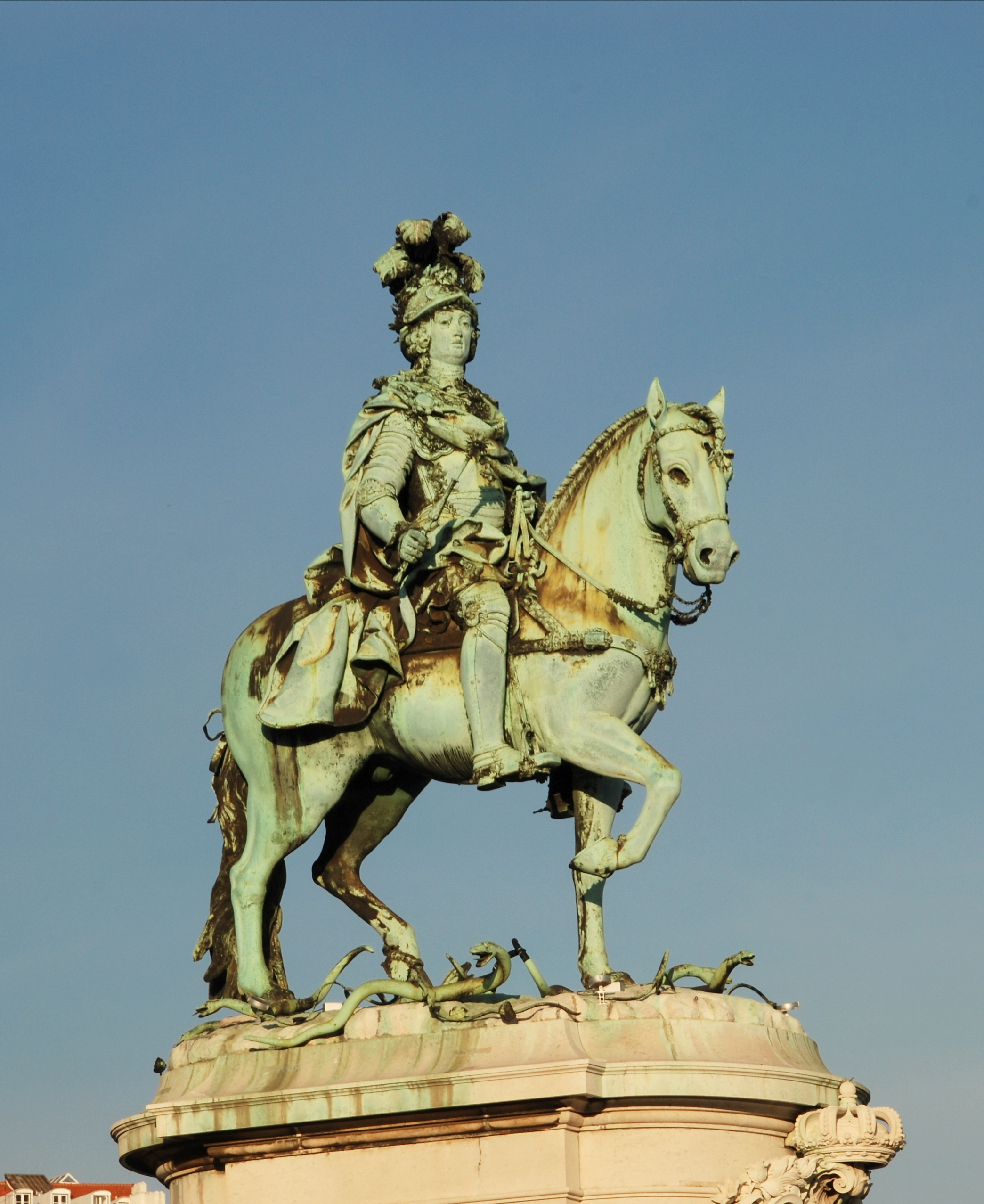
The admiralty brass statue of Joseph I of Portugal in Commerce Square, Lisbon, with a surface layer of green patina caused by advanced oxidation (2011)

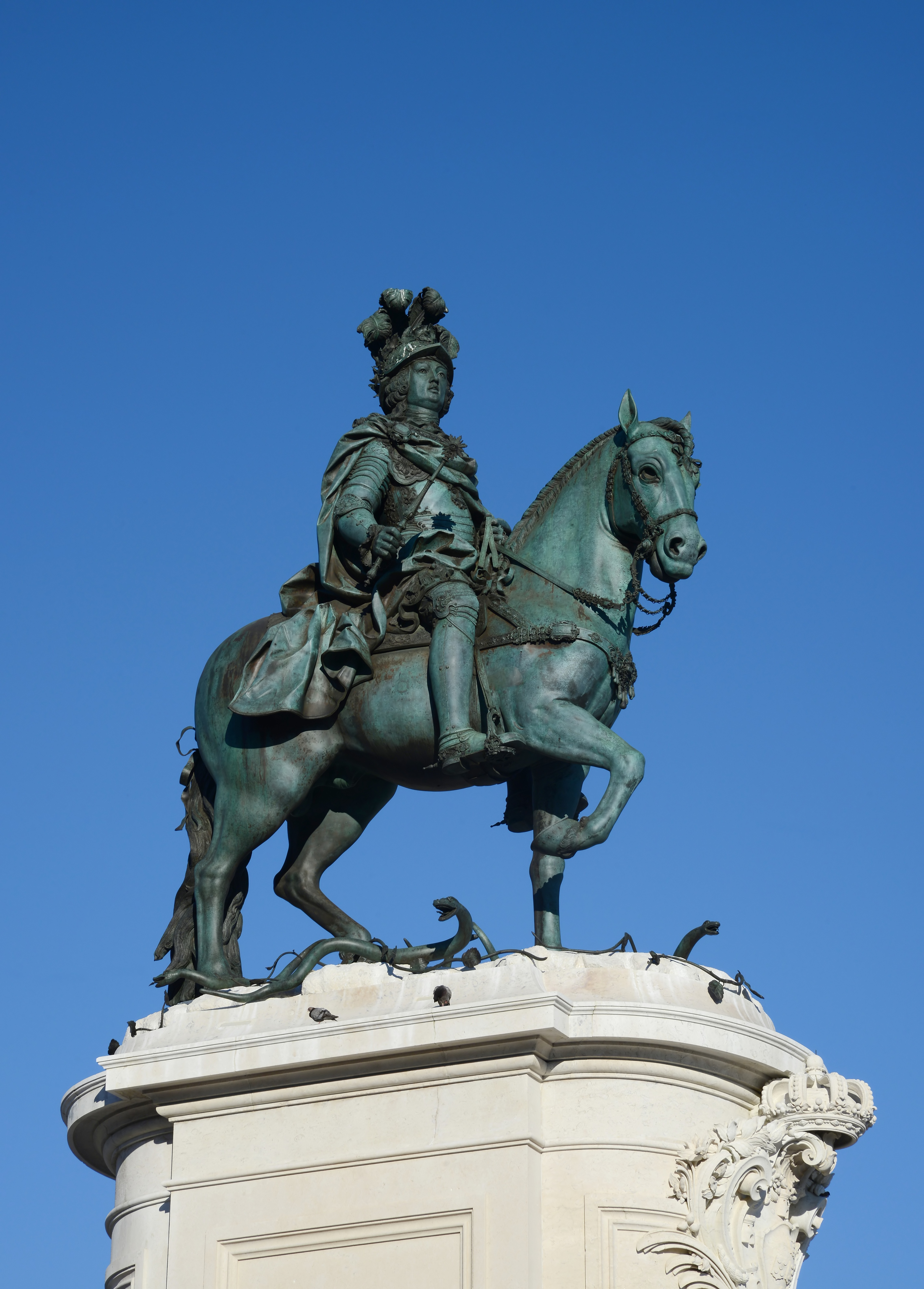
The same statue in 2015, after removal of the patina (2012–13), showing the original 1775 finish. The dark color of the statue made English sailors call the square that houses it "Black Horse Square".

Patina is also found on slip rings and commutators. This type of patina is formed by corrosion, what elements the air might hold, residue from the wear of the carbon brush, and moisture; thus, the patina needs special conditions to work as intended.

Patinas can also be found in woks or other metal baking dishes. The process of applying patinas to cookware is known as seasoning. The patina on a wok is a dark coating of oils that have been polymerized onto it to prevent food from sticking. Scrubbing or using lye soap on a wok or other dishware will damage the patina by either physically or chemically removing the polymerized layers (not to be confused with the surface layer of regular oil), allowing rust to form on the now-exposed bare metal. Modern, less caustic, dish-soaps do not interact with the polymerized coatings, and therefore do not damage cookware patinas, though every effective soap will strip the protective surface-layer oils.

Knife collectors that own carbon steel blades sometimes force a patina onto the blade to help protect it and give it a more personalized look. This can be done using various chemicals and substances such as muriatic acid, apple cider vinegar, or mustard. It can also be done by sticking the blade into any acidic vegetable or fruit such as an orange or an apple.

== Repatination ==
In the case of antiques, a range of views are held on the value of patination and its replacement if damaged, known as repatination.

Preserving a piece's look and character is important and removal or reduction may dramatically reduce its value. If patination has flaked off, repatination may be recommended. Appraiser Reyne Haines notes that a repatinated metal piece will be worth more than one with major imperfections in the patina, but less than a piece still with its original finish.

== See also ==
- Chemical coloring of metals
- Craquelure
- Crazing
- Wabi-sabi
