= AIG (disambiguation) =

AIG is American International Group, an American multinational finance and insurance corporation; the firm's stock symbol on the New York Stock Exchange is also "AIG".

AIG or AiG may also refer to:

- Asian Indoor Games, one predecessor of the Asian Indoor and Martial Arts Games, a pancontinental multi-sport event
- Answers in Genesis, a nonprofit promoting Young Earth creationism
- AIG/Lincoln, original name when established of White Star Real Estate, an international real estate company based in the US
- A.I.G. or Allah Is God, a pop duo
- AIG Financial Products, subsidiary of American Insurer AIG
- AIG Tower, former name of AIA Central, a skyscraper in Hong Kong
- AIG Travel Guard, a North American Travel insurance provider
- And-inverter graph, a concept in computer theory
- Antiguan and Barbudan Creole, a language identified by the ISO 639 code "aig"
- Aigburth railway station in Liverpool, England—via the National Rail Code aka Station Code AIG

== See also ==
- AIG American General, a subsidiary of AIG
- Age (disambiguation)
- TATA AIG, an Indian general insurance company and joint venture
