= Wear and tear =

Naturally occurring physical damage from normal wear and aging

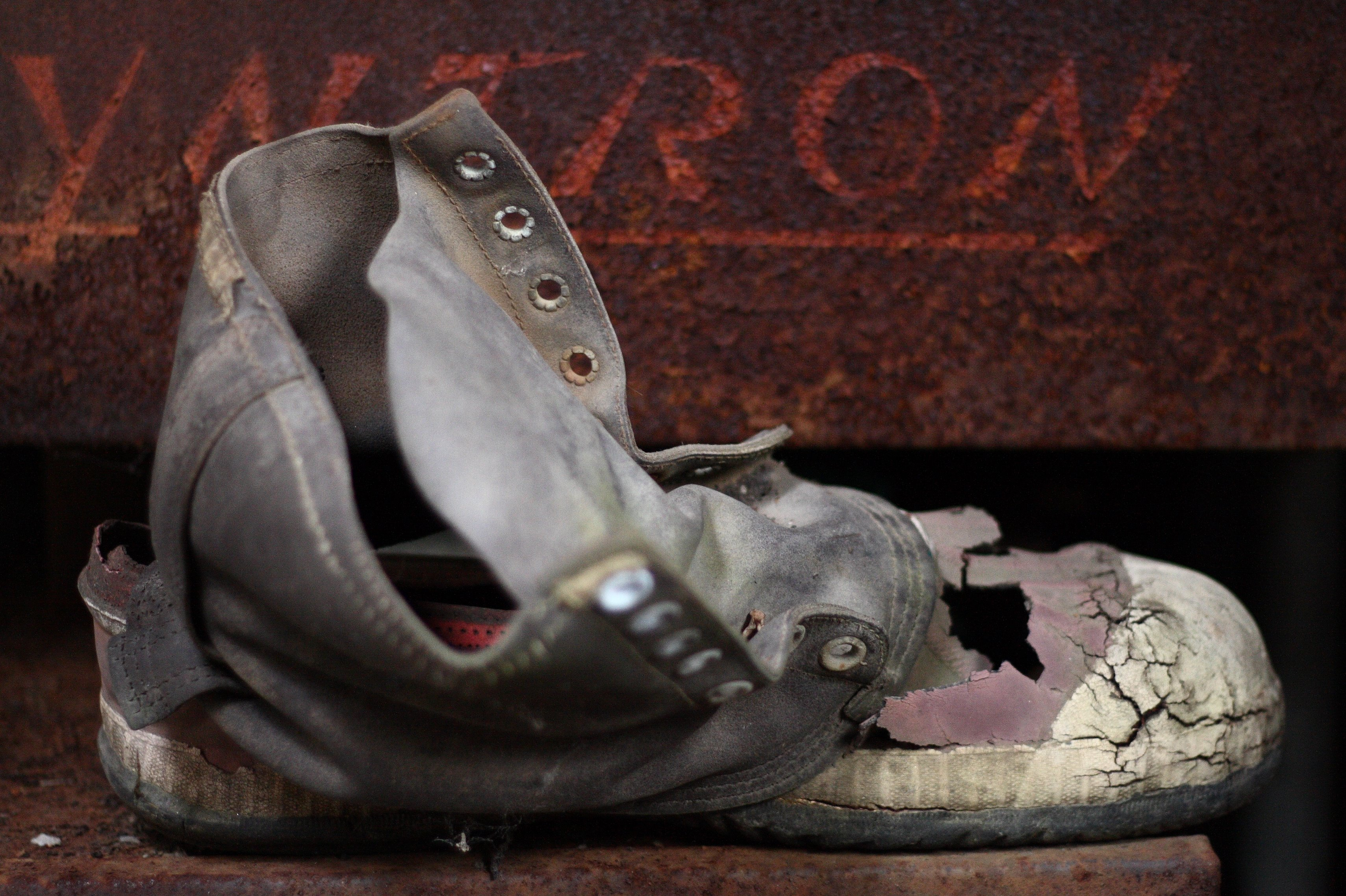
This neglected boot was ruined by a combination of wear and tear and extraordinary exposure to weather.

Wear and tear is damage that naturally and inevitably occurs as a result of normal wear or aging. It is used in a legal context for such areas as warranty contracts from manufacturers, which usually stipulate that damage from wear and tear will not be covered.

Wear and tear is a form of depreciation, which is assumed to occur even when an item is used competently and with care and proper maintenance. For example, repeated impacts may cause stress to a hammer's head. This stress is impossible to prevent in the normal use of the tool for its designed task, and any attempt to avert it impedes its functionality. At the same time, it is expected that the normal use of a hammer will not break it beyond repair during a reasonable life cycle.

If an object's restoration is impossible, it is regarded as consumable. Parts that are designed to wear inside a machine—e.g., bearings and O-rings—are intended to be replaced with new ones; consumables like paper, cardboard, fabrics, and product packaging are designed with a service life commensurate with their intended use. For example, grocery stores may issue customers a paper or plastic sack to carry out groceries, but it is intended that the sack will have a short lifespan before wear and tear would cause it to fail.

Durable goods (e.g., automobiles, heavy machinery, mainframe computers, musical instruments, handguns, water heaters, furnaces) are designed with wear parts that are maintained generally by replacement of parts. One way to determine if a good is durable or not is whether a service technician or repairman would typically attempt repairs on it. A specialist may need to be consulted, such as an auto mechanic, a computer technician, a luthier, a gunsmith, or a plumber. An automobile's engine may be repairable with a simple adjustment or replacement of a single and inexpensive broken part. Similarly, an electric water heater element that fails from years of wear and tear may be replaced rather than the entire water heater.

Whereas an automobile needs consumable fuel and lubricants to operate, components such as tires, seats, and paint are subject to wear and tear and typically are not covered under any warranty when subjected to normal use.

Wear and tear in relation to carpet can be applied to the general area for everyday use, however worn areas around desks and high traffic areas should be considered damage.

== See also ==
- Distressing
- Longevity
- Service life
- Siamese twins (linguistics)
