= White Gardens =

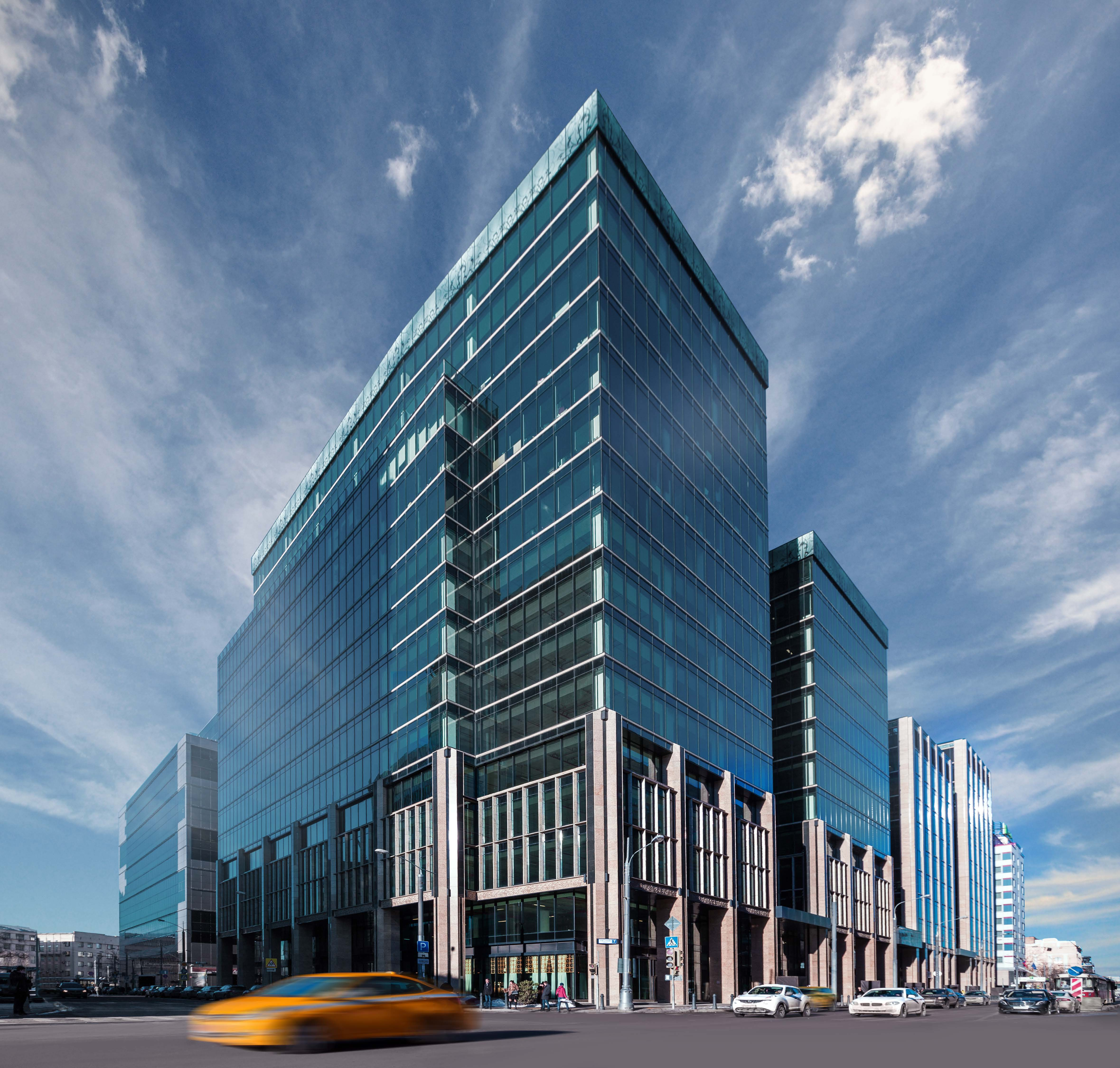
- Interactive map of the White Gardens area

General information
- Status: Completed
- Type: Office
- Location: 7 & 9 Lesnaya Street, Moscow 125047
- Coordinates: 55°46′45″N 37°35′19″E
- Completed: 2013
- Cost: US$750-800 million
- Owner: Millhouse Capital

Technical details
- Floor count: Building A: 16 floors; Building B: 12 floors

Design and construction
- Architecture firm: APA Wojciechowski
- Developer: Coalco Development, AIG/Lincoln
- Awards: Commercial Real Estate Moscow Awards 2014 in the category "Best Class-A Business Center"

Other information
- Parking: 960

White Gardens Office Center is a Class A office center (see Office Grading) located next door to White Square Office Center and nearby the Belorusskaya Metro Station in Moscow, Russia. White Gardens consists of two office buildings, comprising a total of approximately 63,000 square meters (approx. 678,000 square feet) of net rentable area, ground floor restaurants and amenities, and five levels of underground parking. Its defining features include private terraces for select office floors and an arcade between its two buildings. White Gardens is the second phase of the White District development, and is expected to be completed in 2013. The first phase of White District, White Square Office Center, was completed in 2009.

== Building specifications ==
White Gardens Office Center consists of two buildings - one with 16 storeys and one with 12 storeys - comprising a total of approximately 60,000 square meters (approx. 646,000 square feet) of net rentable office area, and approximately 3,000 square meters (approx. 32,000 square feet) of net rentable retail area. In addition, it offers five levels of underground parking, providing roughly 960 parking spaces, and a parking ratio of approximately 1 space per 68 square meters of office space.

== Development & management ==
White Gardens Office Center is being co-developed by AIG/Lincoln, Coalco, TPG Capital, and VTB Capital.

White Gardens Office Center was designed by APA Wojciechowski Architects.

The office center will be managed by AIG/Lincoln, which, in addition to having developed over 2,500,000 square meters of property (approx. 26,910,000 square feet), also manages over 1,480,000 square meters (approx. 15,931,000 square feet) of office, industrial, retail, residential, and entertainment property across Central and Eastern Europe.

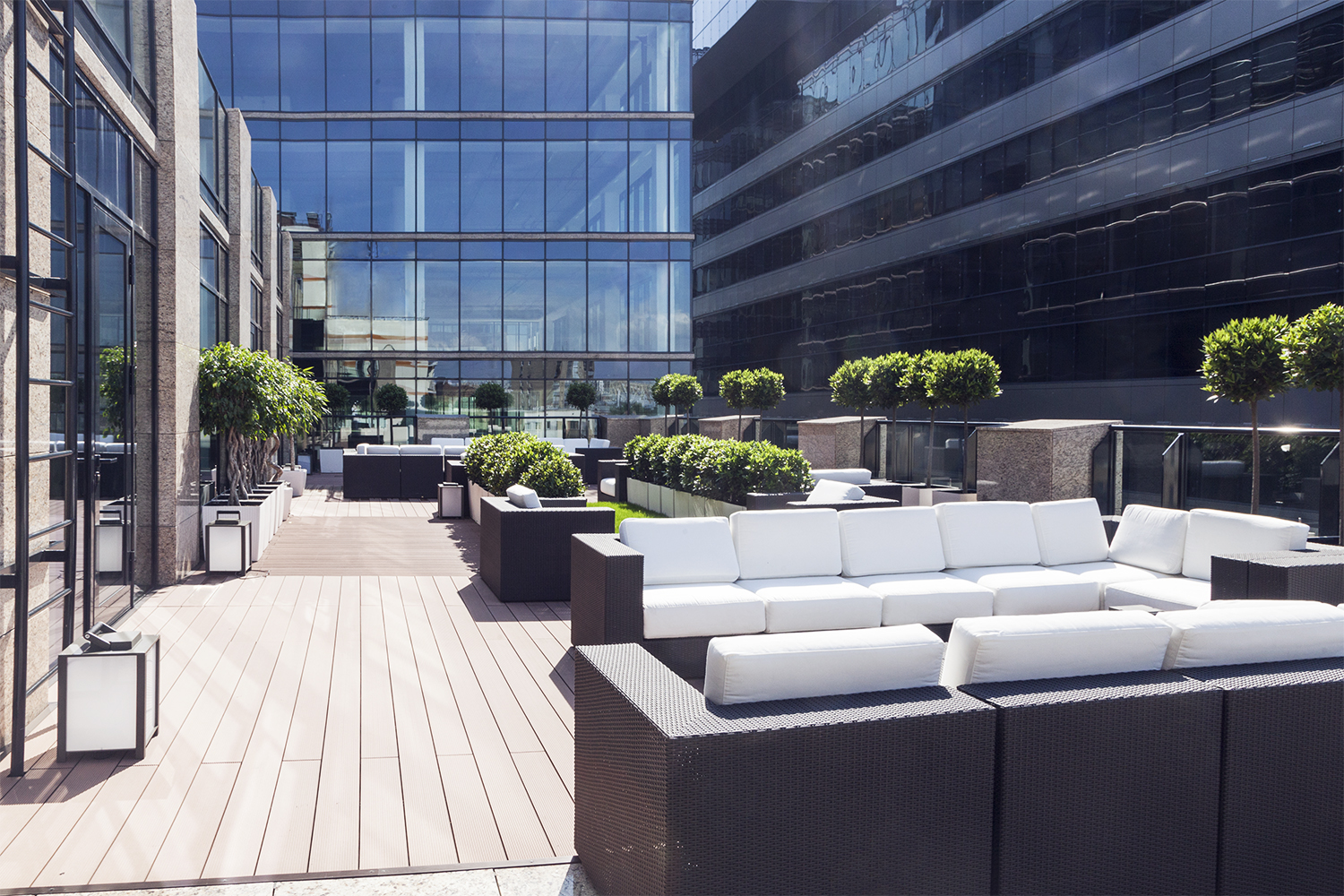
Terraces of the "White Gardens"

== Location & access ==
White Gardens is located near Tverskaya Street and the Belorussky Rail Terminal.

It will have two street addresses: Building A will be located at Lesnaya Street 7, while Building B will be located at Lesnaya Street 9.

The office center is located a block away from one of the Circle Line exits from the Belorusskaya Metro Station, which is also linked to the Green Line.

White Gardens is a short walk from the Belorussky Rail Terminal, which provides direct access to Sheremetyevo International Airport via the Aeroexpress train service. Meanwhile, the Green Line provides quick access from White Gardens to the Paveletskaya Metro station, which in turn has a direct Aeroexpress train link to Domodedovo International Airport, Russia's largest airport.
