= White Square =

Coordinates: 55.7783°N 37.5869°E

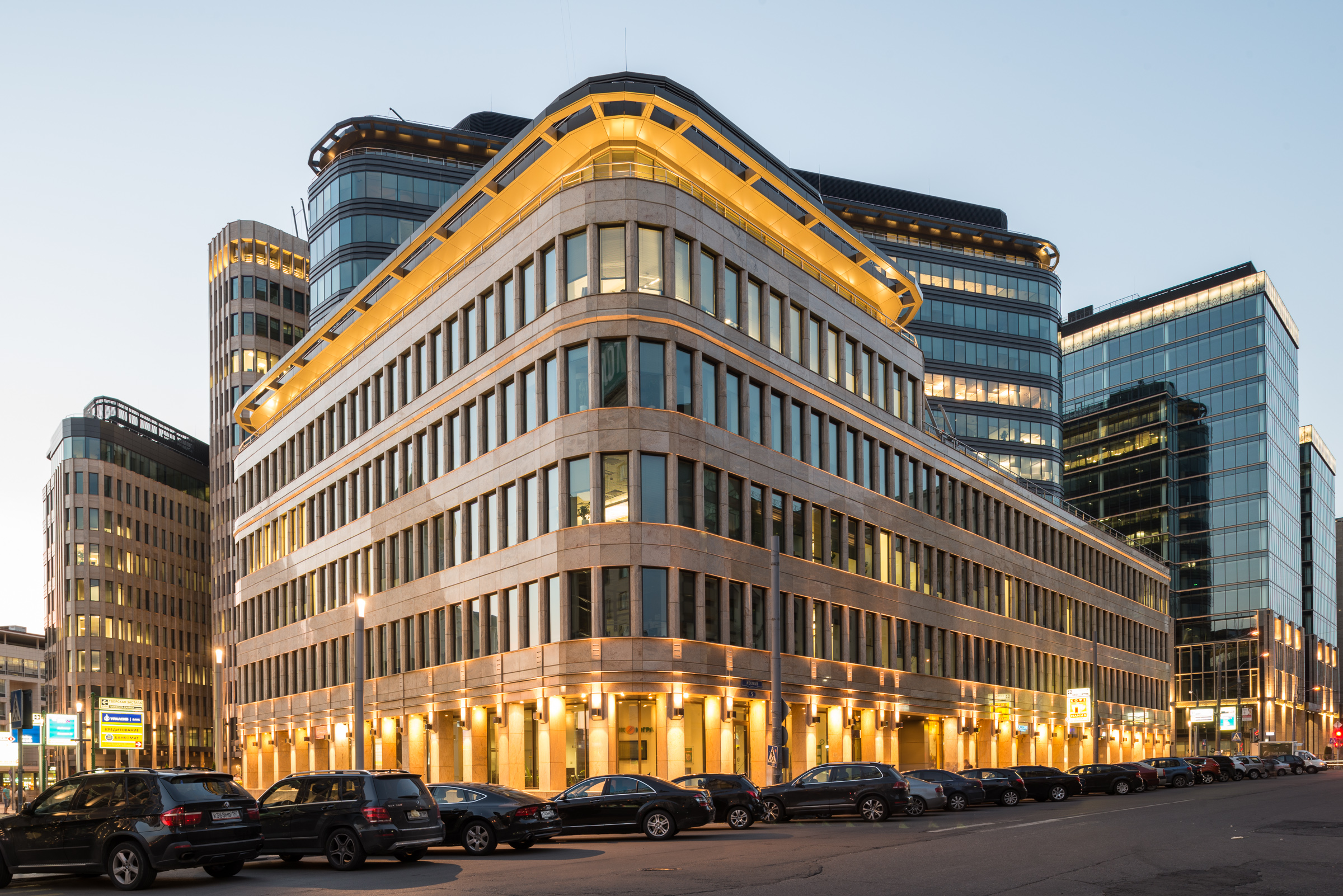
Business Center "White Square"

White Square Office Center is a Class A office center (see Office Grading) located next to the Belorusskaya Metro Station in Moscow, Russia. It is known not only as a business center that houses such multinational companies as Deloitte, McKinsey & Company, WorldQuant and PricewaterhouseCoopers, but also as a community landmark, largely due to its fountain (which, during the winter holiday season, is covered with a giant Christmas tree), piazza, mix of cafes and restaurants, community-focused events, and its view of the adjacent Nikolai Chudotvorets Church.

== Building Specifications ==
White Square Office Center consists of three buildings - two with 15 storeys and one with 6 storeys - comprising a total of approximately 76,000 square meters of net rentable office area, approximately 3,800 square meters (approx. 41,000 square feet) of net rentable retail area, and roughly 802 parking spaces on 3 levels of underground parking.

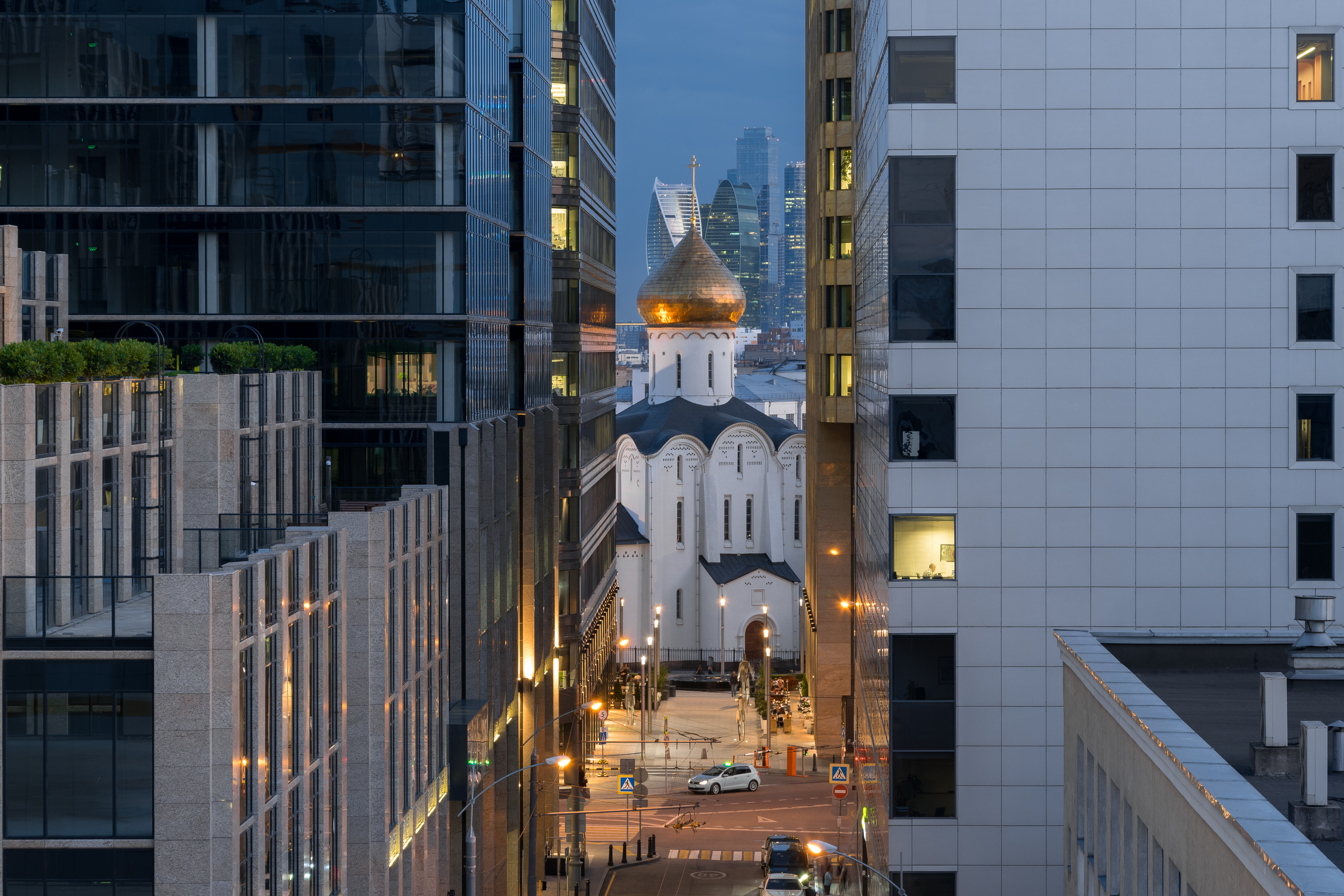
View through 3rd Lesnoy Lane

== Development & Management ==
White Square Office Center was co-developed by AIG/Lincoln and Coalco, as the first phase of the White District development. Its construction was completed in 2009, while the second, final phase of White District, the adjacent White Gardens Office Center, was completed in 2013.

White Square Office Center was designed by APA Wojciechowski Architects and ABD Architects.

In 2013 the office centre was acquired by O1 Properties, the deal was named the largest involving single asset throughout the history of Russian commercial real estate market.

== Occupiers ==
Notable multinational office occupiers of the office center include: BNP Paribas, Deloitte, McKinsey & Company, WorldQuant or PricewaterhouseCoopers. Meanwhile, the office center's street level houses, amongst others, such well-known cafes and restaurants as: Coffeemania, The Hudson Bar, Le Pain Quotidien, Starbucks, Osteria della Piazza Bianca and Torro Grill. In addition, the street level offers amenities such as banks, a dry cleaner, a L'Occitane en Provence cosmetics shop and Pandora store.

== Awards ==
White Square won the Commercial Real Estate Moscow "Development of the Year" award in 2010, the same year it earned its co-developers - AIG/Lincoln and Coalco - "Developer of the Year" awards.

White Square also won the "City for All" award in 2010 from the Moscow government in recognition of having the best handicapped access among the city's office centers and commercial properties.

In 2013 the office centre won The Moscow Times Awards in Best office centre category.

== Community Events ==
White Square regularly hosts community-focused events and attractions, which in the past have included: a flower market to celebrate 1 September, or "Knowledge Day"; an ice labyrinth; concerts; art and photography exhibitions; and an Easter light projection show on the walls of Nikolai Chudotvorets Church, which helped raise funds for children's charity organizations.

In 2014 a "White City" sculpture composition by well-known Russian artist Georgy Frangylian was opened on the territory of the office centre. Seven stainless steel figures of men and women representing typical Muscovites are standing in the pedestrian alleys.

There is also The White Square Journal - local Moscow magazine with a special emphasis on Russian establishment, entertainment, politics, business and economics of the White District, Moscow International Business Center and Rublyovka.

== Location & Access ==
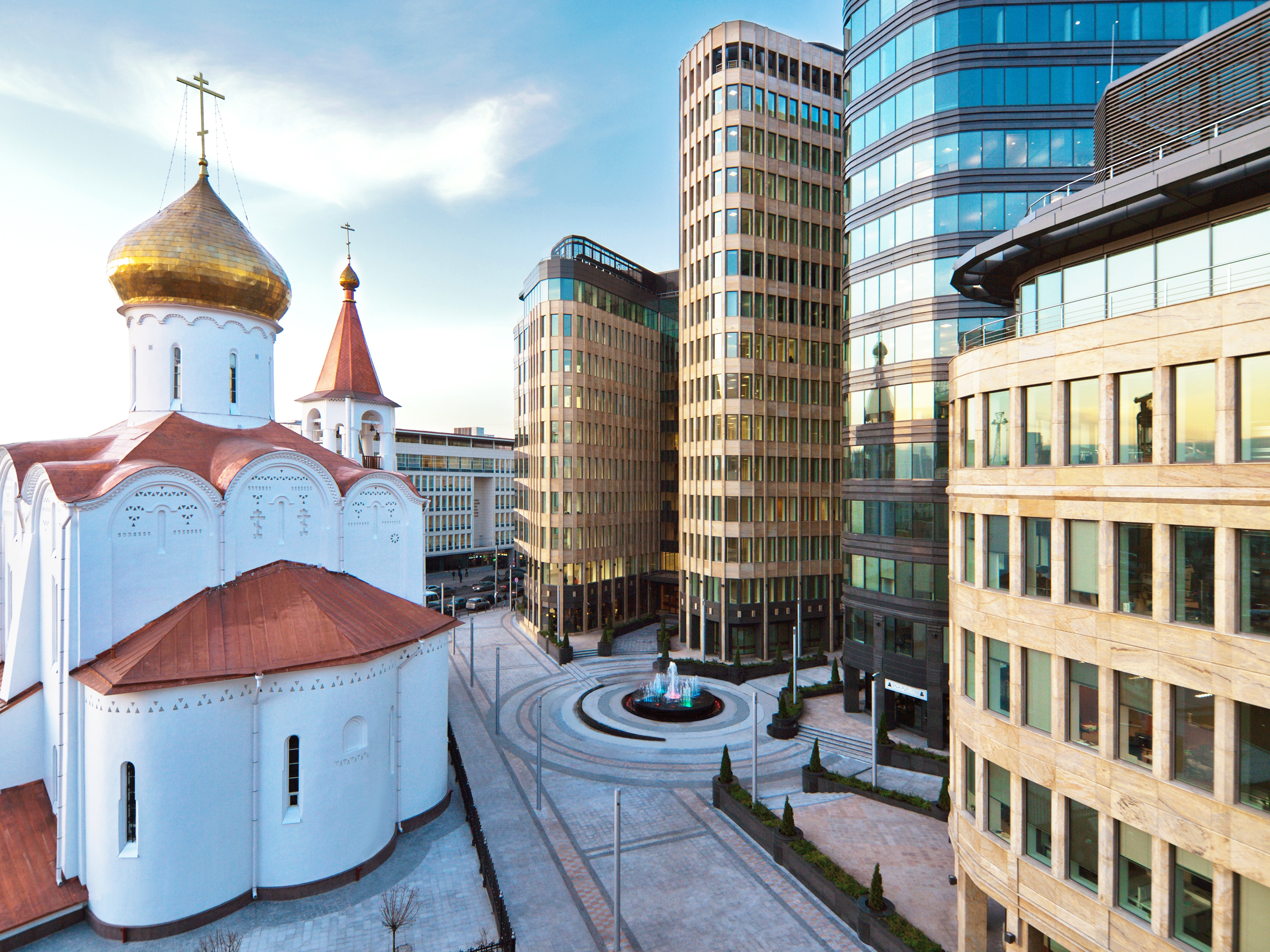
"White Square" and Church of Saint Nicholas

White Square is located near Tverskaya Street and the Belorussky Rail Terminal.

It has two street addresses: Building A is located at Butyrsky Val Street 10, while Buildings B and C are located at Lesnaya Street 5.

The office center is located directly opposite one of the Circle Line exits from the Belorusskaya Metro Station, which is also linked to the Green Line.

White Square is a short walk from the Belorussky Rail Terminal, which provides direct access to Sheremetyevo International Airport via the Aeroexpress train service. Meanwhile, the Green Line provides quick access from White Square to the Paveletskaya Metro station, which in turn has a direct Aeroexpress train link to Domodedovo International Airport, Russia's largest airport.
