= Ageing (disambiguation) =

Aging is the effect of time on a person.

Aging or ageing may also refer to:

== Biology ==
- Senescence, the biological effect of time on an organism
  - Aging in cats
  - Aging in dogs

== Demography ==
- Population ageing, a shift in the distribution of a population towards older ages

== Chemistry and materials science ==
- Polymer degradation, a change of polymer properties due to environmental factors
- Precipitation hardening, a heat treatment of materials
- Ostwald ripening, precipitate or deposit aging in chemistry
- Ageing (textiles), after treatment of textiles

== Food preparation ==
- Aging (food), the leaving of a product to improve its flavor
  - Aging of wine, the effect of time on wine
  - Barrel aging, a method of maturing wine, spirits, etc.
  - Beef aging, a process of preparing beef for consumption
  - Cheese ripening, a process in cheesemaking

== Computers ==
- Aging (file system), a tendency towards data fragmentation in file systems
- Aging (scheduling), an operating system technique for resource allocation
- Software aging, the tendency of software to exhibit problems as time passes by

== Other uses ==
- Aging (artwork), a process by which an artwork is made to appear old
- Aging (journal), a medical journal

== See also ==
- Age (disambiguation)
