= Ages =

Ages may refer to:

- Advanced glycation end-products, known as AGEs
- Ages, Kentucky, census-designated place, United States
- Ages (album) by German electronic musician Edgar Froese
- The geologic time scale, a system of chronological measurement that relates stratigraphy to time
- Arnold Ages (1935-2020), Canadian scholar, writer, and journalist
- Österreichische Agentur für Gesundheit und Ernährungssicherheit GmbH (AGES) the Austrian Agency for Health and Food Safety

== See also ==
- Age (disambiguation)
