= Dunging =

Textile processing method

Dunging was a process used in textile manufacturing to finish printed textiles, particularly those printed with aluminium or iron mordants. It was a process of exposing mordanted products into a solution of cow dung and hot water. Dunging was used to fix mordants as well as remove unfixed mordants and thickening agents from the fabric.

A mordant is a chemical that fixes a dye on a material by reacting with the dye to generate an insoluble compound.

== Etymology ==
The treatment got its name from the cow dung that was the primary ingredient used in the formulation. Later, the process was substituted by certain chemical substances such as molybdic acid, arsenic, or phosphoric acid or soluble salts of tungstic acid.

== Objective ==
Dunging is followed by printing and the ageing process. Dunging removes the thickening agents used in printing and also aids in the detachment of mordants that are only lightly adhered. Additionally, it completes the mordant's fixation on the material and makes it ready and compatible with the dye.

== See also ==
- Ageing (textiles)
