= Åge Austheim =

Norwegian politician

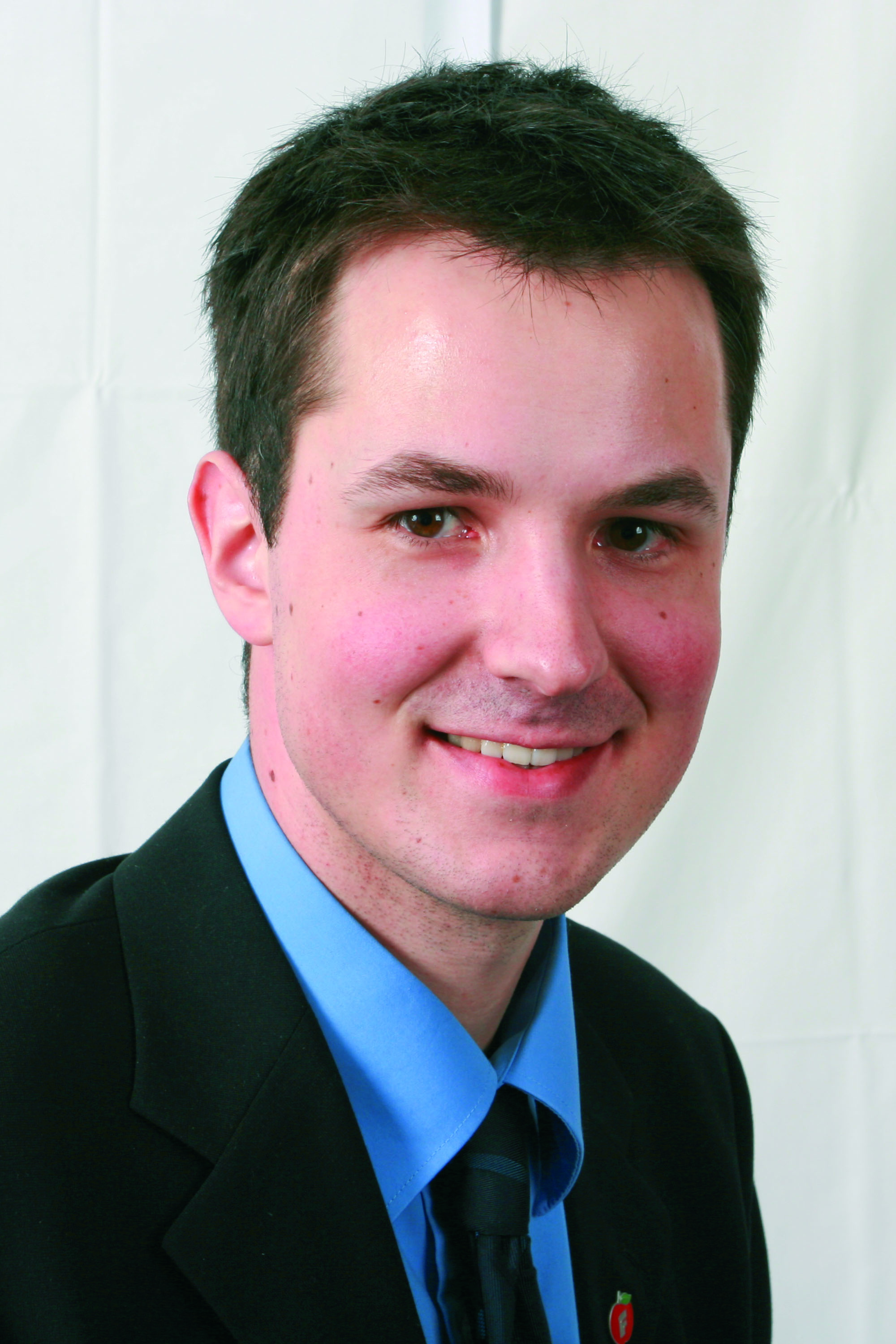
- Portrait of Åge Austheim
- Born: November 20, 1983 (age 42)
- Occupation: Deputy representative to the Parliament of Norway from Nordland
- Years active: 2005-2017

Åge Austheim (born 20 November 1983) is a Norwegian politician for the Progress Party.

He served as a deputy representative to the Parliament of Norway from Nordland during the terms 2005–2009, 2009–2013 and 2013–2017. In total he met during 60 days of parliamentary session. Outside of politics he is a physician in Kristiansund Municipality.
