= Agé =

Agé (or Age) is a god in the mythology of the Fon people of Africa. He is the son of Mawu-Lisa. Agé is the patron god of hunters, the wilderness, and the animals within it. He is the fourth-born son of Mawu-Lisa. When she divided up the realms of the universe among her children, she gave Agé command of the game animals and birds and put him in charge of uninhabited land.
