= Edgar Henrichsen =

Danish musician (1879–1955)

Edgar Henrichsen (19 January 1879 - 24 August 1955) was a Danish composer and organist. He was the brother of Roger Henrichsen, and was a student of Gustav Helsted and Alexandre Guilmant.
