= Åke Ericson (ice hockey) =

Swedish ice hockey player

Personal information
- Nationality: Swedish
- Born: 16 May 1913 Stockholm, Sweden
- Died: 16 November 1986 (aged 73) Stockholm, Sweden

Sport
- Sport: Ice hockey

Åke Esbjörn Ericson (16 May 1913 – 16 November 1986) was a Swedish ice hockey player. He competed in the men's tournaments at the 1936 Winter Olympics and the 1948 Winter Olympics.
