= Åke Larsson =

Swedish footballer (1931–2017)

Personal information
- Full name: Åke Larsson
- Date of birth: 7 September 1931
- Place of birth: Sweden
- Date of death: 23 April 2017 (aged 85)
- Position: Defender

Senior career*
Years	Team	Apps	(Gls)
1952–1959	Malmö FF	111	(2)
- * Club domestic league appearances and goals

Åke Larsson (7 September 1931 – 23 April 2017) was a Swedish footballer who played as a defender. Larsson died on 23 April 2017, at the age of 85.
