= Roger Henrichsen =

Danish composer and pianist

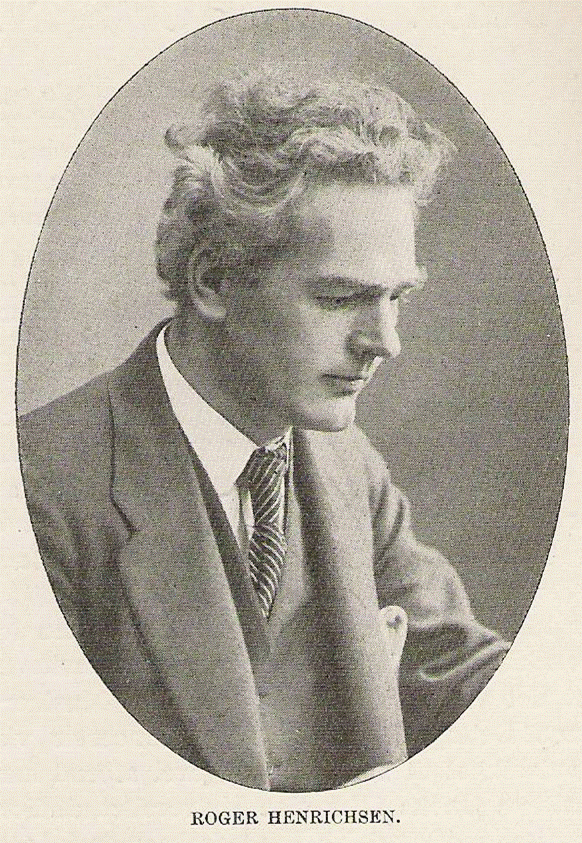
Roger Henrichsen.

Roger Henrichsen (12 February 1876 – 12 January 1926) was a Danish composer and pianist. He was born and died in Copenhagen, and was the brother of Edgar Henrichsen. He was a student of Louis Glass. His works include symphony, chamber music, piano pieces, choral works, and songs.
