= Aage Møller =

American medical professor (1932–2022)

Aage R. Møller
- Born: 16 April 1932; Denmark
- Died: 19 August 2022 (aged 90)
- Title: Founders Professor

Academic background
- Education: Karolinska Institute

Academic work
- Institutions: University of Texas at Dallas

Aage R. Møller (16 April 1932 – 19 August 2022) was a Danish-born American professor of cognition and neuroscience. He was the Founders Professor and Distinguished Lecturer at the University of Texas at Dallas School of Behavioral and Brain Sciences. The Aage and Margareta Møller Distinguished Professorship at The University of Texas at Dallas is named after him.

Møller's research was focused on neuroplasticity, intraoperative neurophysiology and teaching topics such as the biology of pain and fear, anxiety and other emotions. Some of his research dealt with auditory neurophysiology, neuroplasticity, and tinnitus. He wrote over 210 peer-reviewed journal articles, 112 chapters in professional books, 11 books, and edited nine others. In 1977 he founded the international journal, Hearing Research, Elsevier Science Publishers, and remained the journal's Editor‑in‑Chief for 27 years.

Møller was a fellow of the Acoustical Society of America and the American Neurotology Society. In 2006, he was honored by a special issue of the journal Hearing Research.

Møller died on 19 August 2022, at the age of 90.

== Early life and education ==
Møller was born in Finderup, Denmark on April 16, 1932, and grew up in rural Denmark. After being drafted for military service in the Danish Army, servicing radar equipment, he moved to Sweden where he attended the Karolinska Institute earning the degree of Doctor of Medicine. In 1965, he passed the certification exam required for teaching at a university in Sweden. After his doctoral dissertation, he got the position as Docent (assistant professor) at the Karolinska Institute where he taught and did research in auditory neuroscience, studying the function of a nipple pattern on insect eyes and human chromosomes. From 1972 to 1978, he had a position of Research Physician at the Swedish Medical Research Council.

Møller had fellowships at the Research Laboratory of Electronics Massachusetts Institute of Technology Cambridge, and The Johns Hopkins University Department Biomedical Engineering Baltimore.

== Career and research ==
In the 1960s, when Møller came from Denmark to the Royal Institute of Technology (KTH) as a technician, he began his own research related to the function of the middle ear and he developed a model of the transmission properties of the middle ear and the acoustic middle ear reflexes. In 1961, Møller designed a sound stimulating system for animal research.

In 1963, Møller moved to the Department of Physiology II at the Karolinska Institute doing auditory neurophysiological studies supported by private grants and grants from the Swedish Medical Research Council. At the Karolinska Institut, he studied the dynamic properties of a neural system. He conducted some of the first studies of the neural coding of complex (speech-like) sounds in the cochlear nucleus and showed that neural processing in the auditory nervous system is far more complex than earlier believed. He used different kinds of speech-like sounds as stimuli including pseudorandom noise in connection with Winer kernel. He also showed that the frequency selectivity of the cochlea depends on the intensity of the sounds that reached the ear and on how fast the frequency (or spectrum) of a sound change.

Møller studied how exposure to loud noise may become a health hazard and he gave several presentations about "Noise as a health hazard" at national and international conferences such as at the Congress "Science in the Americas" Mexico city in 1973. Møller became involved in legal regulations of noise exposure, and 1975 he served as a Witness for a US Department of Labor's Hearing on Noise Standards, Washington, DC. From 1972 to 1978, he was the Director of Research on Acoustic Communication in Insects, International Center of Insect Physiology and Ecology, Nairobi, Kenya, where he studied the sounds of the tsetse flies as a possible communication that could be interfered with for the purpose of controlling tsetse flies which are a pest in Africa.

While at the Karolinska Institut in the late 1960s, Møller worked with Carl Gustaf Bernhard and William Miller who earlier had found that some night insects had a peculiar pattern of protuberances on the corneas, and Møller found that this pattern on the surface of night moths corneas functions as a very efficient antireflection coating of the insect eyes. This work was done using models of the insect eyes made from beeswax and the reflection from the model with the protuberances were compared with the reflection after the protuberance were removed. The reflection of the model with 3 cm protuberance were measured with electromagnetic (radar) waves in the 3-cm wavelength range.

In the early 1970s, Møller worked with Torbjörn Casperson and Lore Zech at the Medical Cell Research and Genetics Department at the Karolinska Institute in Stockholm on the identification of human chromosomes. Casperson and Zech had earlier developed a new way of staining the chromosomes using a quinacrine mustard stain that made chromosomes fluorescence with a band pattern that they believed was unique for each of the 24 different types of human chromosomes. Møller created a computer algorithm that, for the first time, made it possible to automatically distinguish between individual chromosomes, which also proved that the band-pattern on the quinacrine mustard stained chromosome was unique for each of the 24 human chromosome pairs.

Møller joined the University of Pittsburgh School of Medicine in 1978, first as a research professor at the Department of Otolaryngology and later as a tenured full professor of neurological surgery at the Department of Neurological Surgery, where he did research in the area of neurosurgery and intraoperative neurophysiology. He developed methods for reducing the risks of neurological deficits after neurosurgical operations using electrophysiological recording during neurosurgical operations.

Working with the neurosurgeon Peter Jannetta in the 1980s, Møller used electrophysiologic recordings from brain structures that were exposed during neurosurgical operations to study the pathophysiology of a disorder known as hemifacial spasm. Møller found evidence that the spasm was created by the facial motor nucleus probably through the process of activation of neuroplasticity and not by the pathologies of the facial nerve where it was in contact with a blood vessel. These studies also improved the outcome of operations for hemifacial spasm.

In the late 1970s and early 1980s, Møller was one of the founders of a new subspecialty of neurological surgery and orthopedic surgery that is now known as Intraoperative neurophysiological monitoring (IONM). The purpose of this subspecialty is to reduce the risk of postoperative deficits from inadvertent damage to structures in the brain and the spinal cord by using electrophysiological techniques to detect changes in functions that occurs during surgical manipulations in the removal of brain tumors and other surgical operations. Together with another neurosurgeon, Laligam Sekhar, Møller introduced the use of intraoperative neurophysiological monitoring (IONM) in surgical operations for large skull base tumors reducing the risks of postoperative deficits and other improvements of the outcome of surgical treatment of large brain tumors, including preservation of the function of the facial nerve in operations for tumors on the balance nerve. Before the use of IONM techniques, surgical removal of large acoustic tumors almost inevitably led to a paralysis of the mimic muscles of the face of the side of the tumor.

Møller joined The University of Texas at Dallas School of Human Development in 1997. There he was elected to the Margaret MF Jonsson Endowed Chair. In Dallas, Møller working with Janet Kern, found that some persons with autism spectrum disorder seemed to use their non-classical sensory pathways in the brain to a greater extent than persons who did not have autism. Working with Pamela Rollins, he found signs that children seem to use the non-classical auditory pathways more than adults. In other studies, Møller, together with M. Yokata and Møller, M.B found signs that the non-classical ascending auditory pathways are involved in creating the symptoms of tinnitus. In 2011, he became a distinguished lecturer in the School of Behavioral and Brain Sciences at the University of Texas at Dallas and was elected to the Founders Endowed Chair.

== Awards and honors ==
- 1970 - Fellow of the Acoustical Society of America
- 1989 - Corresponding (Honorary) Member, Die Physikalisch-Medicinische Societat, Germany
- 1990 - Senior Fellow of the American Neurotology Society
- 1990 - Honorary Member, Italian Society of Audiology, Italy
- 2006 - Honored by a Special issue of the journal Hearing Research
- 2011 - House of Representative Recognition, Pete Sessions
- 2012 - Gifford K. Johnson Community Leadership Award
- 2012 - Named Distinguished Lecturer in Cognition and Neuroscience, at the School of Behavioral and Brain Sciences

== Books ==
- Auditory Physiology (1983)
- Evoked Potentials in Intraoperative Monitoring (1988)
- Neural Plasticity and Disorders of the Nervous System (2006)
- A New Epidemic: Harm in Health Care. – How to make rational decisions about Medical and Surgical Treatment (2007)
- The Malleable Brain: Benefits and Harm from Plasticity of the Brain (2009)
- Intraoperative Neurophysiologic Monitoring, 3rd Edition (2010)
- Hearing: Anatomy, physiology, and Disorders of The Auditory System, 3rd Edition (2012)
- Sensory Systems, 2nd Edition (2014)
- Pain: Its Anatomy, Physiology and Treatment, 3rd Edition (2018)
- Neuroplasticity and its Dark Sides: Disorders of the Nervous System, 2nd Edition (2018)
- Neurobiology of Fear, Anxiety and Other Emotions (2019)
