= Åke Ericson =

Swedish photojournalist

Åke Ericson (born 29 November 1962) is a Swedish photojournalist and documentary photographer.

== Life and work ==
Born in Västerås, Sweden. He had his first picture published when he 14 years old and started working as a photographer at the age of 16. After 12 years at various local newspapers in Sweden, he worked at Scandinavia's largest newspaper, Aftonbladet, where he worked for 10 years.

Since 2000 he has been working as a freelance photojournalist. He has been working and travelling in many countries such as Russia, The Balkans, the Czech Republic, France, Slovakia and especially in the Kosovo region. He is affiliated with Redux Pictures in New York and his photography has been published in CNN, Newsweek, Paris Match, Le Figaro, Stern, Le Observatour and Le Monde.

Beginning in 2009 Ericson photographed Romani people in Czech Republic, Hungary, Serbia, Kosovo, Romania and Slovakia for his book Non Grata (2018). Non Grata is Latin for "not welcome".

== Publications ==
- Kosovo in Progress. Bearded Lady, 2011. ISBN 9789186623104.
- Non Grata. London: Gost, 2018. ISBN 978-1-910401-18-7.
- Beyond Afghanistan: the Struggle of the Refugees. Dokument, 2019. With essays by Thord Eriksson and Gabriella Ahlström. ISBN 9789188369345.

== Solo exhibitions ==
- Loxha, Kosovo After the War, Kulturhuset in Stockholm, Sweden 2002; Art Gallery in Hishult, Sweden 2002
- North Korea, Gallery Kontrast Stockholm, Sweden 2006; Arbetets museum Norrköping, Sweden 2007
- Kosovo in Progress, New Art Gallery Pristina, Kosovo 2010; Hasselblad Center Gothenburg, Sweden 2010; Umeå Museum Sweden 2011; Multeum Strängnäs, Sweden 2011

== Awards ==
- Picture Of The Year International - General News Reporting, Second Place 2008
- Issue Reporting Story - Award of Excellence 2008
- Photojournalist Of The Year in Sweden 2008
- Photo Essay of the year in Sweden
- Picture Of The Year International - Finalist, Best Photography Book Award 2012
