= Åke Pousette =

Swedish physician and professor

- Born: Åke Hans Lennart Pousette; 10 May 1949 (age 77); Stockholm, Sweden
- Education: Karolinska Institute
- Occupations: Professor, physician
- Spouse: Ulla Carlegrim (since 1975)

Åke Hans Lennart Pousette (born 10 May 1949) is a Swedish physician and professor.

== Biography ==
Pousette was born on 10 May 1949 in Stockholm. He defended his thesis at Karolinska Institute in 1976. His dissertation was Studies on the control of androgen responsiveness in rat. He was professor of andrology at Karolinska Institute in Stockholm from 2000 to 2010.

He has been married to Ulla Carlegrim Pousette (born 1949) since 1975.
