= Jens Aage Als-Nielsen =

Danish physicist (born 1937)

Jens Aage Als-Nielsen (born 21 January 1937) is a Danish physicist.

He took the dr.philos. degree in 1965, was employed at Risø National Laboratory from 1961 to 1995 and was a professor at the University of Copenhagen from 1995 to 2007. He was a co-creator of the European Synchrotron Radiation Facility.

Als-Nielsen received the Hewlett-Packard Award in 1985 and the Velux Foundation honorary award in 2011. He was a fellow of the Norwegian Academy of Science and Letters from 1996.
