= Åke Andersson (footballer, born 1906) =

Swedish footballer (1906–1982)

Personal information
- Full name: Åke Andersson
- Date of birth: 18 August 1906
- Date of death: 19 March 1982 (aged 75)
- Position: Forward

Senior career*
Years	Team	Apps	(Gls)
–1924	Tunafors SK		
1924–1927	IFK Eskilstuna		
1927	Djurgårdens IF	8	(2)
1928–1938	IFK Eskilstuna		

International career
1930	Sweden	1	(1)
- * Club domestic league appearances and goals

Åke Andersson (18 August 1906 – 19 March 1982) was a Swedish footballer. He made one appearance for Sweden and eight Allsvenskan appearances for Djurgårdens IF.
