= Aage Kadam =

- Directed by: N R Acharya
- Starring: Motilal
- Music by: Madhavlal Damodar Master
- Distributed by: Acharya Art
- Release date: 1943
- Country: India
- Language: Hindi

Aage Kadam (English translation – Forward March) is 1943 Hindi-language black-and-white film directed by N. R. Acharya and starring Motilal, Anjali Devi, Mubarak, Padma, Rajkumari Shukai and Amritlal.
