= Åke Olsson =

Swedish footballer

Personal information
- Date of birth: 19 April 1926
- Date of death: 13 March 2009 (aged 82)

Senior career*
Years	Team	Apps	(Gls)
- IFK Trollhättan
- IFK Malmö
1953–1957	Djurgården	63	(0)
- * Club domestic league appearances and goals

Åke Olsson (1926 – 2009) was a Swedish footballer. Olsson was part of the Djurgården Swedish champions' team of 1954-55. Olsson made 63 Allsvenskan appearances for Djurgården and scored 1 goals. His brother, Hasse Olsson, also played in the Allsvenskan for GAIS.

== Honours ==
=== Club ===
Djurgårdens IF

- Allsvenskan: 1954–55
