= Åke Kromnow =

Swedish archivist, historian and civil servant

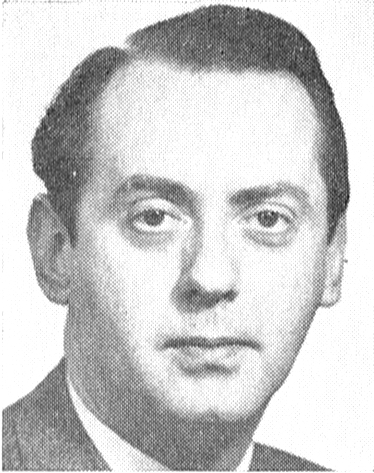
- Born: Ernst Åke Kromnow; 2 May 1914; Stockholm, Sweden
- Died: 27 April 1986 (aged 71); Stockholm, Sweden
- Occupations: Archivist, historian, intelligence officer
- Years active: 1939–1979
- Known for: National Archivist of Sweden
- Spouse: Birgitta Lager (m. 1970)

Ernst Åke Kromnow (2 May 1914 – 27 April 1986) was a Swedish archivist, historian and civil servant. He was National Archivist and head of the National Archives of Sweden from 1965 to 1979.

== Early life ==
Kromnow was born on 2 May 1914 in Stockholm, Sweden, the son of director Axel Kromnow and his wife Emma (née Norman). He was secretary in the Swedish National Union of Students from 1937 to 1939 and he received a Bachelor of Arts degree the same year.

== Career ==
In 1939, Kromnow became an employee of the National Archives of Sweden. He received a Licentiate of Philosophy degree three years later and became first assistant in 1945. During World War II, Kromnow was part of the Swedish intelligence agency C-byrån. In January 1946 he and the future National Librarian Uno Willers reported the head of C-byrån, Carl Petersén, to the Supreme Commander, General Helge Jung due to irregularities committed by Petersén and the agency during the war. Petersén was dismissed from his post the same year. Kromnow became temporary archivist in 1948 and was the leader of the Swedish archives delegation to Berlin the same year. He became archivist in 1950 and had public research assignments in England the same year. Two years later he was appointed deputy director and head of the Ministry for Foreign Affairs' archive. Kromnow was chairman of the Industry and Commerce Archives Council (Näringslivets arkivråd) from 1955 to 1970 (honorary chairman) and had public research assignments in the Soviet Union in 1958. He was also an archive consultant in the Swedish industry and expert in the 1960 Publicity Commission. Kromnow was a member of the Utility Board for Universities and University Colleges from 1961 to 1965 and chairman of the Personal History Society (Personhistoriska samfundet) from 1964 to 1971 (honorary member). In 1965 he left his position at the Ministry for Foreign Affairs and was appointed National Archivist and head of the National Archives of Sweden, a position he held until 1979.

Kromnow was chairman or board member of a number of boards, committees and foundations. He was chairman of the Diplomatarium Committee of the Royal Swedish Academy of Letters, History and Antiquities 1965–1976, National Heraldry Board (Statens heraldiska nämnd) and Swedish Archive Society (Svenska arkivsamfundet) from 1965 to 1979, Svenskt biografiskt lexikon 1965–1977, Sweden's Press Archive (Sveriges pressarkiv) 1966–1975 and the 1967 Data Archiving Committee. He was board member of the Delegation for Military History Research (Delegationen för militärhistorisk forskning) 1966–1982, Archive of the Swedish labour movement (Arbetarrörelsens arkiv) 1966–1982, Swedish Emigrant Institute in Växjö 1966–1979, Board of the Nordic Museum 1967–1984 (vice chairman in 1970), Skansen 1967–1984. Kromnow was chairman of Dialect and Place Name Archives (Dialekt- och ortnamnsarkiven) as well as Swedish Folk Music Archive (Svenskt visarkiv) 1970–1977, Swedish Music History Archive (Svenskt musikhistoriskt arkiv) 1971–1981 and vice chairman of the Swedish Historical Society 1973–1975. He was a member of the Executive Committee of the International Council on Archives 1973–1978 and the National Humanist Research Council (Statens humanistiska forskningsråd) 1975–1977. Kromnow was chairman of the State Archives Board (Statens arkivstyrelse) 1977–1979, Association of Swedish Cultural History (Föreningen för svensk kulturhistoria) 1977–1984 and vice chairman of the government agency National Art Museums (Statens konstmuseer) from 1979. He was also expert in the Ministry of Education 1979–1984 and special investigator for place names activities in 1980.

== Personal life ==
In 1970 he married Birgitta Lager (1920–1999).

== Death ==
Kromnow died on 27 April 1986 and was buried at Skogskyrkogården in Stockholm.

== Awards and decorations ==
- (Sweden) Knight of the Order of the Polar Star
- (Denmark) Commander of the Order of the Dannebrog
- Grand Decoration of Honour in Gold for Services to the Republic of Austria

== Honours ==
- Member of the Royal Society for Publication of Manuscripts on Scandinavian History (1962)
- Member of the Royal Swedish Academy of Letters, History and Antiquities (1971)
- Member of the Royal Gustavus Adolphus Academy (1975)
- Honorary Doctors of Stockholm University (1969)
- Corresponding member of the Indian Historical Records Commissission (1969)

== Selected biography ==
- Kromnov, Åke (1939). Övermasmästareämbetet under 1700-talet (1751-1805): dess organisation och verksamhet samt betydelse för den svenska tackjärnstillverkningen (in Swedish). Stockholm. SELIBR 411203.
- Kromnov, Åke (1947). ÖHur man ordnar ett industriarkiv: handledning utarbetad på uppdrag av Sveriges industriförbund (in Swedish). Stockholm. SELIBR 9994.
- Boëthius, Bertil; Kromnow, Åke (1947). Jernkontorets historia: minnesskrift. D. 1, Grundläggningstiden (in Swedish). Stockholm. SELIBR 393698.
- Kromnov, Åke (1951). Kabinettets för utrikes brevväxlingen hemliga räkenskaper i riksarkivet (in Swedish). Stockholm. SELIBR 2751939.
- Boëthius, Bertil; Kromnow, Åke (1968). Jernkontorets historia: minnesskrift. D. 2. 1, L' ancien régime (in Swedish). Stockholm. SELIBR 393699.
- Boëthius, Bertil; Kromnow, Åke (1968). Jernkontorets historia: minnesskrift. D. 2. 2, Den ekonomiska liberalismens genombrottstid (in Swedish). Stockholm. SELIBR 393700.

Government offices
Preceded by Ingvar Andersson	National Archivist of Sweden; 1965–1979	Succeeded by Sven Lundkvist
