= Åke Jönsson =

Swedish footballer

Personal information
- Date of birth: 26 June 1925
- Date of death: 18 December 1998 (aged 73)
- Position: Midfielder

Senior career*
Years	Team	Apps	(Gls)
1943–1958	Helsingborgs IF		

International career
1951–1957	Sweden	11	(1)
- * Club domestic league appearances and goals

Åke Jönsson (26 June 1925 – 18 December 1998) was a Swedish footballer who played as a midfielder. He made eleven appearances for the Sweden national team from 1951 to 1957. He was also part of Sweden's squad for the football tournament at the 1952 Summer Olympics, but he did not play in any matches.
