= Åke Bergman =

Swedish swimmer

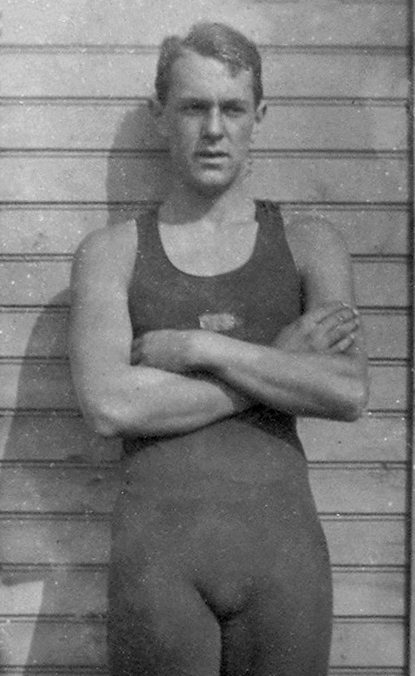

Personal information
- Born: 26 May 1896 Malmö, Sweden
- Died: 27 February 1941 (aged 44) Malmö, Sweden

Sport
- Sport: Swimming
- Strokes: Backstroke
- Club: Malmö SS

Åke Herman Gottfrid Bergman (26 May 1896 – 27 February 1941) was a Swedish swimmer. He competed at the 1912 Summer Olympics in the 100 m backstroke event, but failed to reach the final.

Bergman lived with his parents Anders and Berta near a public bath, where he started training in swimming. He later also played water polo but lost vision in one eye after an injury during a competition. He was a hatter by profession, as his father owned a hat factory and had a daughter, Karin.
