= Åge Steen =

Norwegian football player and manager (born 1960)

Personal information
- Date of birth: 11 February 1960 (age 66)
- Position: Left-back

Senior career*
Years	Team	Apps	(Gls)
- Kongsvinger

Managerial career
- 1996–1997: Kongsvinger
- 1999–2000: Haugesund
- 2000–2004: Norway (women)
- * Club domestic league appearances and goals

Åge Steen (born 11 February 1960) is a Norwegian football manager and former player.

== Career ==
A left-back, Steen spent his playing career in Kongsvinger IL from 1982 through 1983 and 1986 through 1988, as well as lesser teams Grue IL and Kjellmyra IL.

Steen also managed Kongsvinger from 1996 through 1997, later FK Haugesund from 1999 to 2000. He was the head coach of the Norway women's national team from 2000 to 2004, including at the 2003 FIFA Women's World Cup.
