= Åge Maridal =

Norwegian footballer (1965–2023)

Personal information
- Full name: Åge Roar Maridal
- Date of birth: 11 April 1965
- Place of birth: Brattvåg, Norway
- Date of death: 19 July 2023 (aged 58)
- Place of death: Ålesund, Norway
- Position: Midfielder

Senior career*
Years	Team	Apps	(Gls)
1981–1985	Brattvåg		
1986	Hødd		
1987–1989	Start	29	(4)
1990	Namsos		
1991	Fyllingen	6	(0)
1992–1983	Brattvåg		
1994–1996	Stordal		
- * Club domestic league appearances and goals

Åge Roar Maridal (11 April 1965 – 19 July 2023) was a Norwegian football midfielder.

Maridal began his career at his local side Brattvåg, where he made his first-team debut at age 16, before moving on to second-tier team Hødd in 1986. Praised as Sunnmøre's best player of 1986, he was picked up by first-tier team Start the following year. Following a stint at Namsos, he returned to the first tier in 1991 with Fyllingen. While at Fyllingen, he came on as a substitute in the team's match against Atlético Madrid in the European Cup Winners' Cup. He later spent two years back in Brattvåg before moving on to Stordal in the lower leagues.

In June 1996, Maridal was in a car accident that left him paralyzed from the waist down. He later openly admitted that he was driving under the influence at the time of the accident, and subsequently participated in several public service campaigns to warn about the dangers of drink-driving. Despite being in a wheelchair, he worked as a youth coach for his former club Stordal.

Åge Maridal died on 19 July 2023, at the age of 58.
