= Aage B. Sørensen =

Danish-American sociologist (1941–2001)

- Born: 13 May 1941; Silkeborg, Denmark
- Died: 18 April 2001 (aged 59); Boston, Massachusetts
- Education: Johns Hopkins University
- Scientific career
- Fields: Sociological theory, mathematical sociology
- Workplaces: University of Wisconsin, Harvard University
- Thesis: The Occupational Mobility Process: An Analysis of Occupational Careers (1972)
- Doctoral advisor: James Samuel Coleman
- Doctoral students: Trond Petersen

Aage Bottger Sørensen was born on May 13, 1941, in Silkeborg, Denmark, and died on April 18, 2001, in Boston, Massachusetts, United States.

In 1967, Sørensen was the first recipient of a master's degree in Sociology from the University of Copenhagen. He went on to Johns Hopkins University in Baltimore where he earned a Ph.D. in Social Relations in 1971. From 1971 to 1984, Professor Sørensen taught at the University of Wisconsin, serving as department chair in Sociology from 1979 to 1982. He was appointed to the faculty at Harvard University in 1984. As chair of the Sociology Department from 1984 until 1992, he led a substantial renewal of its faculty and programs. From 1994 until his injury, he was chair of Harvard's Joint Doctoral Program in Organizational Behavior.

Sorensen's main contribution involved theories of how social and economic inequality reflects the unequal distribution of opportunities and social resources. His work offered a sociological alternative to some economic theories that see inequality as a result of differences in training and education. Instead, he argued that the benefits of education and training depended on whether jobs were available on a freely competitive basis or whether access to them was restricted in various ways. Persistent inequalities, he argued, occur when individuals and groups are able to limit access to jobs, education and other opportunities.

Sorensen died in Boston, having been in poor health since February 2000, when he was injured in a fall on ice near his home. He was survived by his wife Annemette, director of the Henry A. Murray Research Center at the Radcliffe Institute for Advanced Study, his son, Jesper, and three grandchildren, Nikolaj, Benjamin, and Chloe.
