= Åge Nordkild =

Norwegian politician (1951–2015)

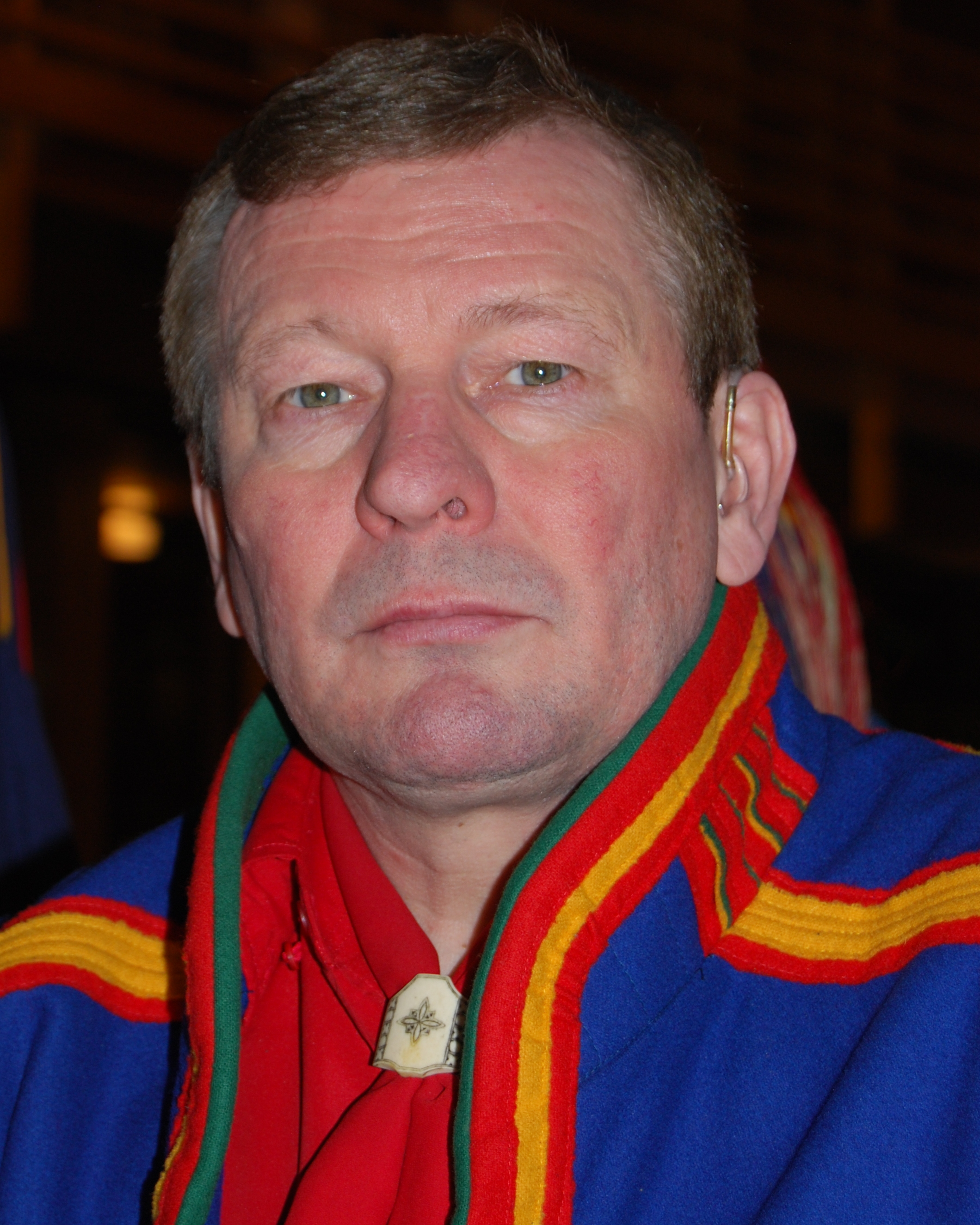
- Nordkild in February 2008
- Born: 19 September 1951; Narvik, Norway
- Died: 28 December 2015 (aged 64)
- Occupation: Politician

Åge Nordkild (19 September 1951 – 28 December 2015) was a Norwegian Sami politician.

== Early life and career ==
Åge Nordkild was born in Narvik. He represented the Norwegian Sami Association and held several positions in the Sami Parliament from 2001 to 2005 and 2009 to 2013.

== Death ==
Nordkild died in 2015 at the age of 64.
