= Åke Pettersson (Finnish footballer) =

Finnish footballer (1926-2000)

Personal information
- Date of birth: 20 March 1926
- Date of death: 21 November 2000 (aged 74)
- Position: Midfielder

International career
Years	Team	Apps	(Gls)
1947–1956	Finland	3	(0)

Åke Pettersson (20 March 1926 – 21 November 2000) was a Finnish footballer. He played in three matches for the Finland national football team from 1947 to 1956. He was also part of Finland's squad for the 1952 Summer Olympics, but he did not play in any matches.
