= Åke Pettersson (Swedish footballer) =

Swedish footballer

Senior career*
Years	Team	Apps	(Gls)
- Djurgården
- * Club domestic league appearances and goals

Åke Pettersson is a Swedish retired footballer. Pettersson made 15 Allsvenskan appearances for Djurgården and scored 3 goals.
