= Ageing (textiles) =

After treatment of printed and dyed goods

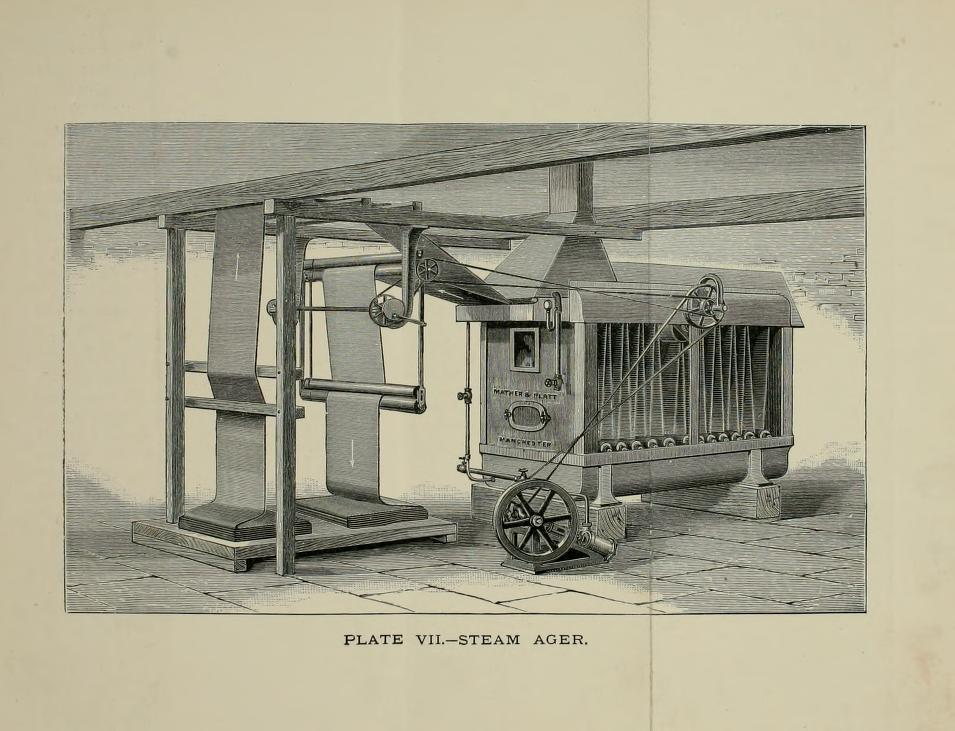
Steam Ager

Ageing (also called aging, stoving, and hanging) is a kind of after treatment process for certain printed textile materials in which the goods are exposed to warm and moist atmosphere. Steaming is an evolved way to obtain the intended results. The objectives of the ageing process include the developing and fixing of the mordants and colors.

The process is carried out using a variety of machines, including "loop agers." Fabric hangs and runs over guide rollers as it is exposed to steam at a certain temperature and for a specific amount of time.

== History ==
Initially, colours were fixed through the action of sunlight, air, and dew, which evolved into ageing rooms and, more recently, rapid-aging systems (in the form of steam-cabinets).

Stoving was the early name used to describe the process of ageing in wooden or brick chambers heated by a furnace beneath. In stoving, temperature or heating was the consideration, while it ignored moisture application. When block printed material (one of the earliest forms of printing textiles) containing iron or aluminium mordants was thought to require merely heat to adhere to fabric, it was used. Those chambers were named "stoves." Stoving was first used to dry and age printed items, taking into account things like dye smearing and marking. Later, when it was found that steam and cold air without heat gave better results, stoving rooms were turned into ageing rooms.

=== D. Koechlin ===
D. Koechlin was the first to emphasize the critical nature of carefully regulating the humidity level in ageing rooms.

=== Process improvements ===
The machine which reduced the ageing time from days to hours was introduced by Thom and Walter Crum. John Thom developed the first system that provided for the methodical introduction of moisture into the oxidation chamber.

== Purpose ==
While the term "ageing" is more commonly associated with printed items, the process also implies the dyeing of Aniline black. It is a treatment for printed materials that is done afterward to achieve better fixation and make them last longer.

The primary objectives of ageing include the development and fixation of mordants and colors. The following are some other areas where ageing has an effect.

- Development of iron and aluminum mordants, aging improves the bleeding and spreading of color on non-printed areas.
- Helps in oxidation promotion in the case of application of Catechu brown, Aniline black, and manganese bronze.

== Process ==
The treatment takes place in a chamber supplied with saturated steam at atmospheric pressure. The required conditions are created in an ager machine fitted with controls that maintain a specified temperature on the fabric for a fixed time frame. With continual feeding, an ager can hold and release the cloth. A variety of ageing machines are used for this purpose. The names of the ageing machines include loop ager, festoon ager, cottage steamer, star steamer, and tower ager. Some machines are used for batch processing, while others are used for continuous processing; a loop ager is a continuous type of machine.

In some cases, loop ager is also employed in polyester dyeing.

=== Acid ageing ===
When acid vapours (from volatile acids) are used to conduct the action, this is referred to as acid ageing.

== See also ==
- James Thomson (calico printer)
- Dunging
