= Åge Spydevold =

Norwegian footballer (1925-1982)

Personal information
- Date of birth: 22 August 1925
- Date of death: 9 March 1982 (aged 56)

International career
Years	Team	Apps	(Gls)
1951–1959	Norway	4	(0)

Åge Spydevold (22 August 1925 – 9 March 1982) was a Norwegian footballer. He played in four matches for the Norway national football team from 1951 to 1959.
