= White Star Real Estate =

International real estate company based in the United States

- Industry: Real estate
- Founded: 1997
- Headquarters: United States
- Area served: Europe
- Services: Real estate development & management
- Website: Official website

White Star Real Estate, is an international real estate company whose core businesses include acquisition and development of properties, and provision of asset and property management services. The company has been present in the Central and Eastern European region since 1997, completing more than 2.5 million square meters in over 50 development projects and currently managing more than 130 buildings. These properties include a large portfolio of landmark office buildings, as well as several warehouse, retail, leisure and residential developments.

== History ==
Initially established in 1997 as AIG/Lincoln, a strategic partnership between AIG Global Real Estate Investment Corporation and Lincoln Property Company of Dallas, Texas.

The company was formed to acquire, develop and manage real estate properties internationally, with an initial focus on the then emerging markets of Central & Eastern Europe, establishing offices in the Czech Republic; former East Germany; Hungary; Poland; Romania; Bulgaria; Russia; Slovakia; and later in Italy; and Spain.

In 2015, the management of AIG/Lincoln organized a buy-out and rebranded the company as White Star Real Estate. The name is a reference to the company's Texas origins.

== Operations ==
White Star Real Estate is currently active in the Czech Republic; Hungary; Poland; Romania; and Slovakia with local teams staffing major offices in Warsaw; Budapest; Prague; and Bucharest.

As of 2023, the company has several real estate developments in progress, adding to its past track record of over 50 development projects, totaling over 2.5 million square meters (approx. 27 million sq. ft.). These cover a wide range of property categories, including offices, industrial facilities, retail centers, and multifamily residential projects. The company has also delivered several build-to-suit projects for specific tenants.

In addition to its development activities, White Star Real Estate also provides real estate asset and property management services, for properties it has developed, and as well as other properties acquired by its real estate investment clients. The company currently manages over 130 buildings of office, industrial, retail, residential, property across Central & Eastern Europe.
