= Pousette =

- Country: Sweden
- Origin: Wallonia, Belgium

Pousette is a Swedish family name of Walloon origin.

Pousette is one of Sweden's largest Walloon families and the name was originally written Poncet. The family has a strong connection to the forges in northern Uppland, where the family members worked mainly during the first century after arriving in Sweden in the 1620s. Ancestors of the family are the brothers Gottfrid and Martin Pousette who signed contracts in Liège in eastern Belgium in 1627 and from 1629 worked at Lövsta forge. Gottfrid Pousette worked at Forsmark forge 1640–1649 and was a few years later at Gimo forge while Martin Pousette worked at Österby forge and at the forge in Nora before he was active at the forge in Hillebola from 1644 until 1651.

In the Swedish family calendars of 1963 and 1974, the Gävle branch of the family is said to have originated from the wholesaler and shipowner Johan Fredrik Pousette (1816–1880).

== Genealogy of prominent members ==
  - Gottfrid Pousette (lived at least between 1595 and 1651), smelter, Gimo forge
    - Frans Pousette (ca 1615–1691), smelter, Österby forge
      - Gottfrid Pousette (ca 1645–1731), smelter, Österby forge
        - Gottfrid Pousette (1685–1731), hammersmith, Österby forge
          - Jakob Pousette (1719–1768), bookkeeper, Österby forge
            - Henrik Pousette (1753–1821), smelter, Österby forge
              - Johan Jakob Pousette (1796–1839), blacksmith, Österby forge
                - Charlotta Pousette (1836–1921)
                  - Alma Matilda Hübinette (1861–1899), married to John Morén, church musician, composer
    - Noak Pousette (ca 1622–1703), smelter, miller, Österby forge
      - Noak Pousette (1669–1749), smelter, Skebo forge
        - Johan Pousette (1712–1790), smelter, Skebo forge
          - Johan Pousette (1753–1829), smelter, Skebo forge
            - Johan Raphael Pousette (1775–1844), foreman, Edsbro blast furnace
              - Johan Pousette (1802–1881), driver, veterinarian
                - August Ferdinand Pousette (1830–1881), hammermaker, smelter
                  - Johan Peter Pousette (1852–1932), smelter in Brattfors
                    - Karl Hjalmar Pousette (1880–1950), ironworker
                      - Rune Pousette (1917–2008), first bureau secretary of the Royal Railway Board then director of the bureau at SJ
                        - Åke Pousette (born 1949), professor
                  - Karolina Pousette (1862–1941), married Wilhelm Zakarias Wilhelmsson, ironworker
                    - Sigurd Pousette (1892–1946), correspondent
                      - Ingemar Pousette (1926–2000), engineer, CEO
              - Per Magnus Pousette (1805–1888), park ranger, Edsbro
                - Karl Johan Pousette (1829–1897), park ranger, Edsbro
                  - Magnus Fridolf Pousette (1864–1935), park ranger, Edsbro
                    - Karl Vilhelm Pousette (1889–1980), sawmill worker, machinist, Edsbro
                      - Dan Wilhelm Pousette (1915–1984)
                        - Tomas Pousette (born 1950), economist
  - Martin Pousette (ca 1610–1651), smelter, Hillebola forge
    - Mårten Pousette (1646–1702), Älvkarleö forge
      - Mårten Pousette (1675–1745), master hammersmith, Älvkarleö forge
        - Johan Pousette (1718–1760), blacksmith, Älvkarleö forge
          - Mårten Pousette (1752–1797), blacksmith, Älvkarleö forge
            - Lars Pousette (1781–1837), master hammersmith, Älvkarleö forge
              - Lars Gustav Pousette (born 1809), blast furnace worker, foreman, Gysinge forge
                - Lars Fredrik Pousette (1832–1902), master hammersmith, Gysinge forge
                  - Karl Fredrik Pousette (1859–1910), carpenter, Gysinge forge then Stockholm
                    - Gerda Kristina Pousette (1892–1983), married to Simon Svensson, engineer and architect, they had children who took on the name Pousette
              - Johan Fredrik Pousette (1816–1880), wholesaler, shipowner in Gävle, started the Gävle branch
                - Fredrik Pousette (1851–1905), captain, landowner
                  - Harald Pousette (1886–1975), diplomat, married Cecilia Cedercrantz, daughter of Conrad Cedercrantz and Elisabeth Sjöcrona
                    - Tage Pousette (1921–2012), diplomat

=== Unplaced branches ===
- Karl Anders Pousette (1792–1873), jeweler, goldsmith, of "unknown mother"
  - Mauritz Pousette (1824–1883), actor, married Charlotte Pousette (née Nordgren) and then to Johanna Vilhelmina Hagelin
    - Mauritz Ingemar Pousette (1881–1952), engineer
      - Carl-Gustaf Pousette (1912–1966), engineer
        - Madeleine Pousette, journalist
- Anna Pousette, married with Anders Lundström, churchwarden in Adolf Fredrik, Stockholm
  - Anna de Wahl (1844–1889), actress, married to Oscar de Wahl, composer, conductor, arranger
    - Anders de Wahl (1869–1956), actor
