= Granbery =

Granbery is a surname. Notable people with the surname include:

- Henrietta Augusta Granbery (1829–1927), American painter
- John Cowper Granbery (1829–1907), American clergyman
- Virginia Granbery (1831–1921), American painter, sister of Henrietta

== See also ==
- Granberg
- Granberry
