= Grandberry =

Grandberry is a surname. Notable people with the name include:

- Ken Grandberry (1952–2022), American football running back
- Omari Grandberry (born 1984), stage name Omarion, American R&B singer, songwriter, actor and dancer

== See also ==
- Grandberry Crossroads, Alabama, United States, unincorporated community in Henry County
- Grandberry Park, Minami, Japan; location of Minami-machida Grandberry Park Station
- Granberry, surname
- Granbery, surname
