= Mauritz Pousette =

Swedish actor

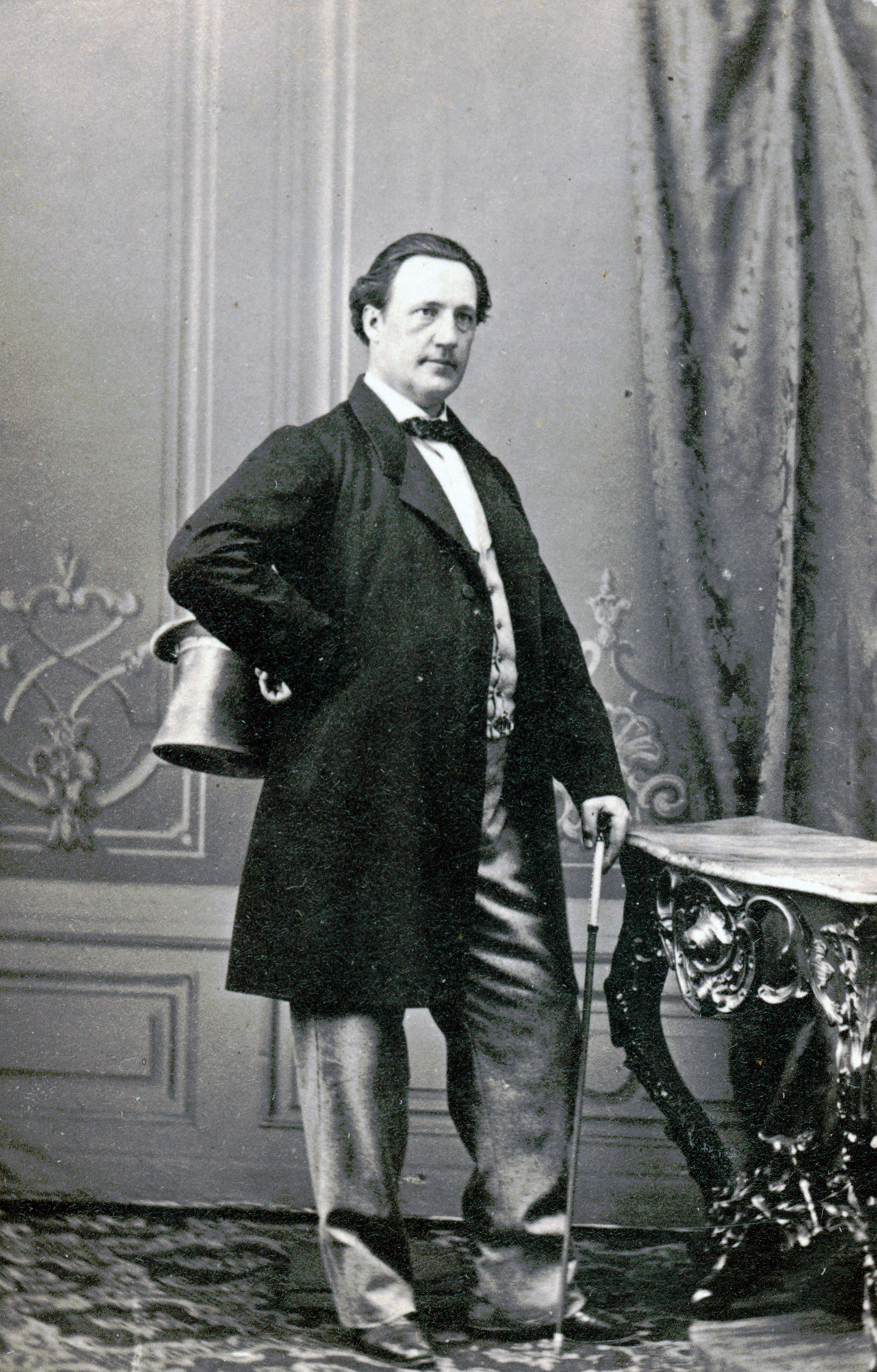
- Mauritz Pousette in 1863
- Born: Charlotte Nordgren; 1 July 1824; Stockholm, Sweden
- Died: 27 February 1883 (aged 58)
- Occupation: Actor
- Years active: 1851–1876
- Spouse(s): Charlotte Pousette; Johanna Vilhelmina “Mina” Hagelin

Mauritz Pousette (1 July 1824 – 27 February 1883) was a Swedish actor.

== Biography ==
Mauritz Constantin Pousette was the son of the jeweler Carl Anders Pousette (1792–1873) and Carolina Sophia Sundberg (1794–1859).

Pousette was hired by court secretaries Berggren, P. Deland and Stjernström. He had his own company together with Oscar Andersson and Wilhelm Åhman 1863–1867 in the countryside and at Humlegårdsteatern in Stockholm. He was involved with the Mindre teatern in Stockholm and the New Theater in Gothenburg 1867–1874 and at the New Theater in Stockholm 1874–1883. Among the roles he played are Carl IX in Bartholomeinatten, Ingomar in Skogens son, Posa in Don Carlos, Narcisse Rameau, Erasmus Montanus, Carl II in Don Cesar de Bazano and Gaston in Klädeshandlaren och hans måg.

He was first married to the actress Charlotte Pousette (1832–1877) and then to the actress Johanna Vilhelmina “Mina” Hagelin (1849–1929). He had a daughter Cecilia Constance Amalia Sofia Pousette (1863–1928), who became a teacher, and a son Mauritz Ingemar Pousette (1881–1952), who became an engineer.

He died on 27 February 1883 in Hedvig Eleonora Parish in Stockholm.

== Theater ==
=== Roles (incomplete) ===
Year	Role	Production	Theater
1875	Byggmästare Jacobsen	En fallit Bjørnstjerne Bjørnson	Swedish Theater
1875	Gil Perez	Farinelli eller Kungen och sångaren Jules-Henri Vernoy de Saint-Georges, Auguste Pittaud de Forges och Adolphe de Leuven	Swedish Theater
1875		Tadelskolan; Richard Brinsley Sheridan	Swedish Theater
1875	Peder Stolpe	Siri Brahe och Johan Gyllenstierna; Gustav III	Swedish Theater
1876	Axel Oxenstierna	Drottning Christina; Jeanette Stjernström	Swedish Theater
1876	Gustav II Adolf	Regina von Emmeritz; Zacharias Topelius och August Söderman	Swedish Theater
1876	Informatorn	Amors genistreck Henrik Hertz	Swedish Theater
1876	Amtmannen	De nygifta Bjørnstjerne Bjørnson	Swedish Theater
1876		I Sverige 1676; Louise Stjernström	Swedish Theater
1877	Kapten Örn	De oförsonlige Ernst Lundquist	Swedish Theater
1877	Doktor Tholosan	Många vänner, lite vänskap Victorien Sardou	Swedish Theater
