= Granberg =

Granberg is a surname. Notable people with the surname include:

- Carolina Granberg (1818–1884), Swedish ballerina
- Devlin Granberg (born 1995), American baseball player
- Emanuel Granberg (1754–1797), Finnish painter
- Fredde Granberg (born 1970), Swedish actor, playwright and director
- Jeanette Granberg (1825–1857), Swedish writer and playwright
- Joonas Granberg (born 1986), Finnish professional golfer
- Kurt M. Granberg (born 1953), American politician
- Lars U. Granberg (born 1965), Swedish politician
- Louise Granberg (1812–1907), Swedish playwright and theatre director
- Petter Granberg (born 1992), Swedish professional ice hockey player
- Ulf Granberg (1945–2026), Swedish comics creator and editor
