= Granberry =

Granberry is a surname. Notable people with the surname include:

- C. Read Granberry (1899–1962), American teacher and civil servant
- Darryl Dwayne Granberry Jr. (born 1997), American YouTuber and rapper known as "DDG"
- Edwin Granberry (1897–1988), American writer, novelist, and translator
- George Caldwell Granberry, American politician, postmaster, and teacher
- George W. Granberry (1848–1927), American newspaper publisher, physician, and state legislator
- Julian Granberry, American anthropologist, linguist, ghost writer and writer

== See also ==
- Granbery
- Grandberry (disambiguation)
