= Charlotte Pousette =

Swedish actress

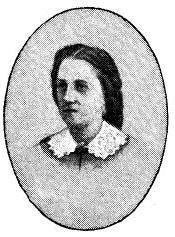
- Born: Charlotte Nordgren; 23 January 1832; Stockholm, Sweden
- Died: 28 April 1877 (aged 45)
- Occupation: Actress
- Years active: 1851–1876
- Spouse: Mauritz Pousette

Charlotte Pousette (née Nordgren; 23 January 1832 – 28 April 1877) was a Swedish stage actress. She was a star attraction of Swedish theatre in the 1850s and 1860s and enjoyed widespread fame.

Charlotte Pousette was a student of the Royal Dramatic Training Academy. She was engaged at the theatre company of Edvard Stjernström in 1852–63. As such, she was active at the Mindre teatern in Stockholm (1854–63), and performed in Finland (where the Stjernström company had theatre monopoly in 1850–53); on 15 September 1859, she performed a main role in the inauguration of the Stora Teatern in Gothenburg. She was a member of the theatre company of Wilhelm Åhman and her spouse Mauritz Pousette in 1863–74 (and a such engaged at the Stora Teatern in Gothenburg in 1869–74), and finally at the Swedish Theatre in Stockholm in 1874–77.

In 1887, was described in retrospect:

"Her ability, always well tuned, often shining, shifted in different phases; in the historical play (marquise Pompadour in "Narcisse Rameau", Elisabeth of Valois in "Don Carlos"), in the romantic play (Parthenia in "Ingomar eller skogens son", Helena in "Konungens läkare"), in the work of Shakspeare (the wetnurse in "Romeo and Juliet", Karin in "Så tuktas en argbigga"), in the work of Molière (Toinette i "Den inbillade sjuke" and Dorine in "Tartuffe"), in the work of Bellman (the Hostess in "Gröna lund" and Ulla Winblad i "Johan Fredman"), in the burgher drama (Fru Mohrin in "Familjen Mohrin"), in the operetta (Regina in "De löjliga mötena" and Maria in "Den ondes besegrare"), in vaudeville (Armantine in "Hofvet i Biberack"), in the new French comedy by Scribe, Augier and Sardou (duchess de Langeais in "Kärlek och vänskap", mrs Lecoutellier in "Notarien Guérin" and marquise d’Auberive in "Moderna vinglare" as well as Seraphine in the play of that name, among others. In the latest mentioned role, which was given at the Mindre teatern in 1869, her art was on the point of its culmination; the masterful relief, which she gave the terrifying image of piousness and indulgence, given of the Second Empire by the writer of Seraphine, was lively admired by the critics of that time."
