= Anna de Wahl =

Swedish actress and singer

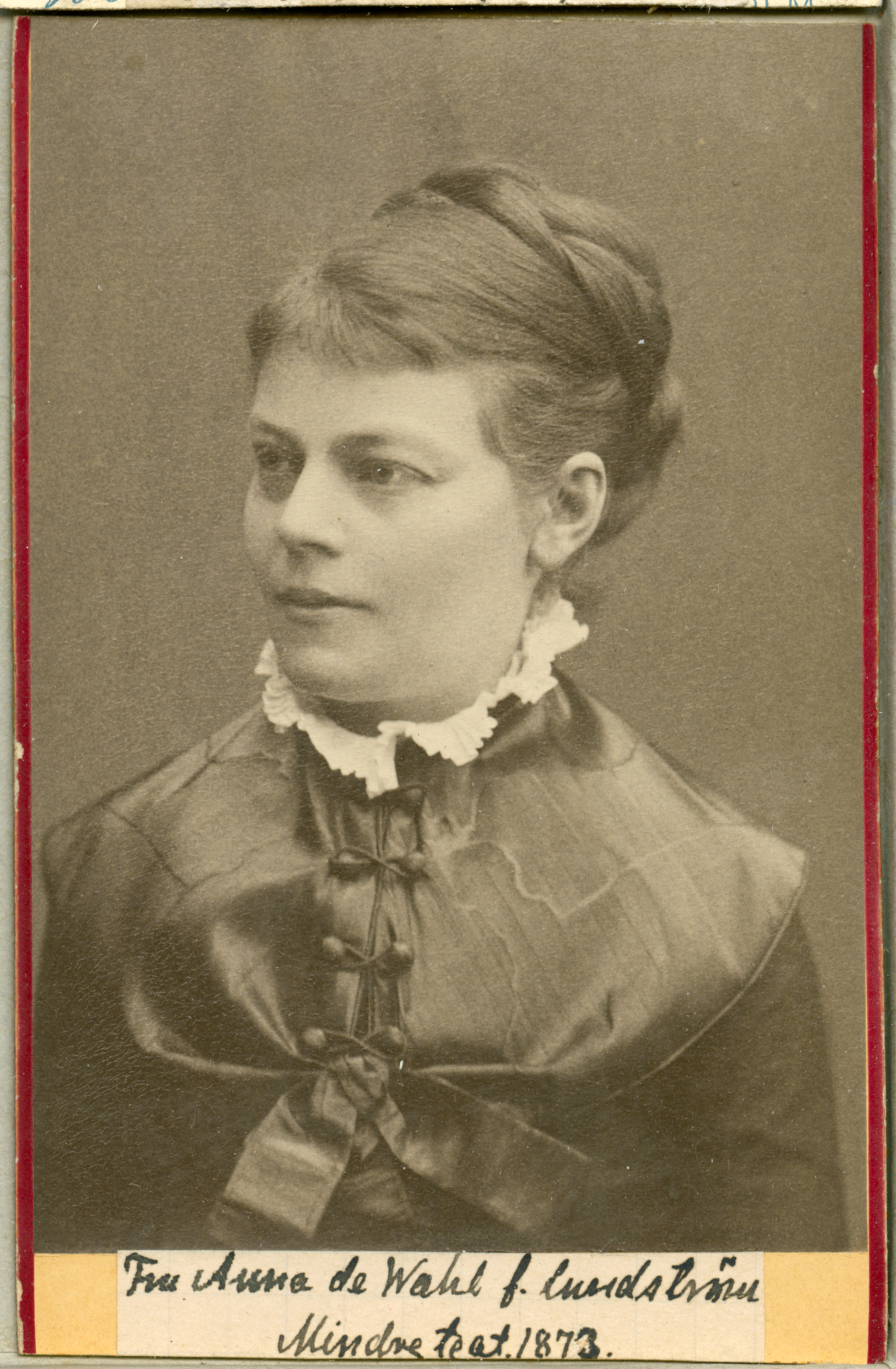
- Anna de Wahl in 1873
- Born: Anna Lundström; 25 May 1844; Roslagen, Uppland, Sweden
- Died: 18 May 1889 (aged 44)
- Burial place: Adolf Fredrik Church, Stockholm, Sweden
- Occupations: Actress, singer
- Years active: 1851–1876
- Spouse: Oscar de Wahl (1867-1873)
- Children: Anders de Wahl

Anna de Wahl, née Lundström (25 May 1844 – 18 May 1889) was a Swedish actress and singer.

== Biography ==
She was born in Roslagen, in the Swedish Uppland. De Wahl was born out of wedlock to the sea captain and lighthouse keeper of Singö Ebbe Jansson and Anna Ersdotter Frimodig, and grew up as a foster daughter with her uncle Anders Ersson Lundström, church caretaker at Adolf Fredrik Church in Stockholm.

When she was eleven years old she came to Selinderska student theater where she remained until 1866. After that she was involved, from 1866 to 1872, at Södra teatern and played the years 1872-1884 alternately at Mindre, Södra and Nya teatern in Stockholm and at Nya Theatern in Gothenburg. The following year she performed at the Swedish Theatre in Helsinki and from 1886 to 1887 she was at the Vasateatern in Stockholm.

In 1867 she married music director Oscar de Wahl. They had a son together, actor Anders de Wahl.

== Gallery ==
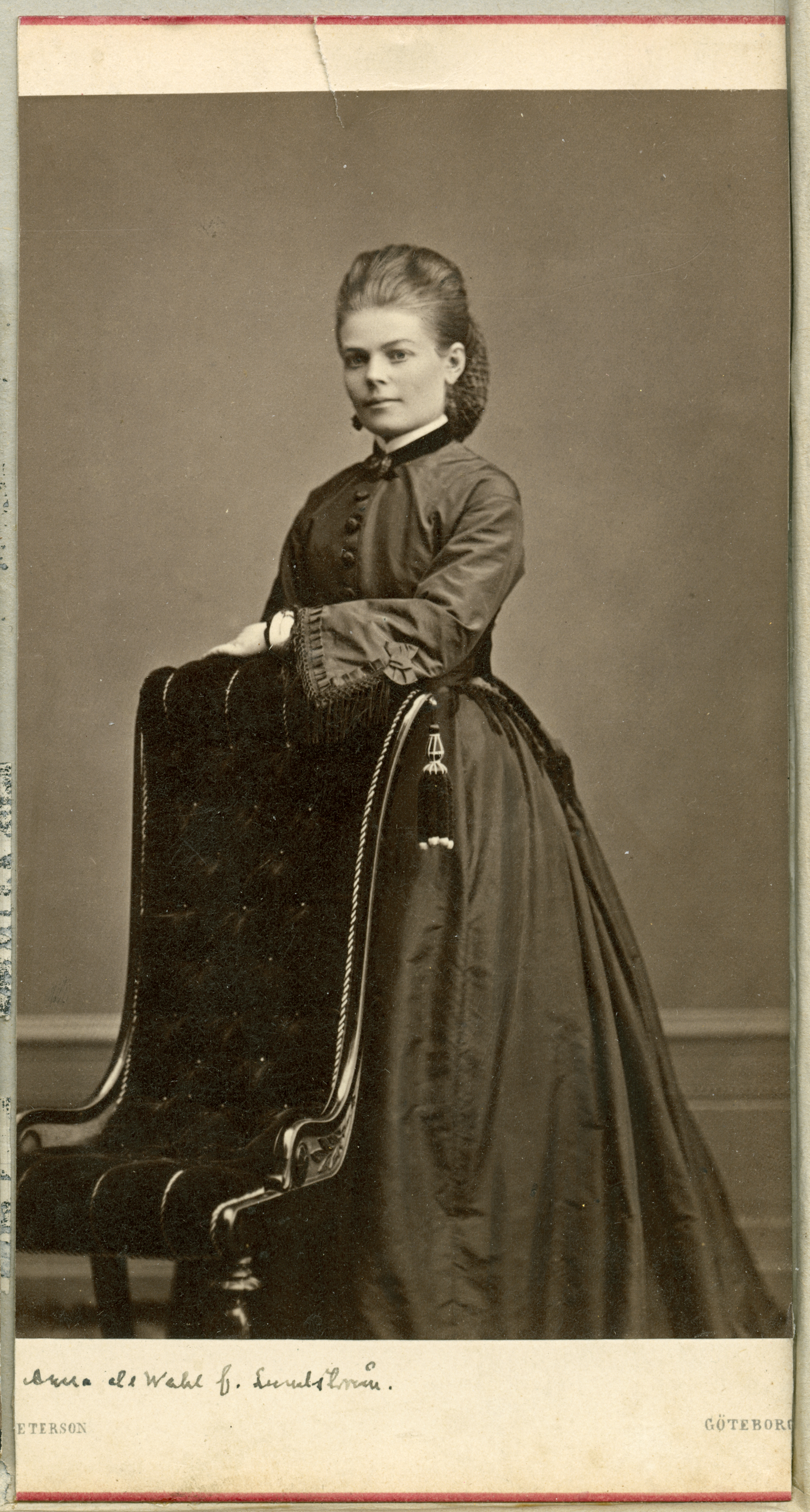
Portrait from around 1860.

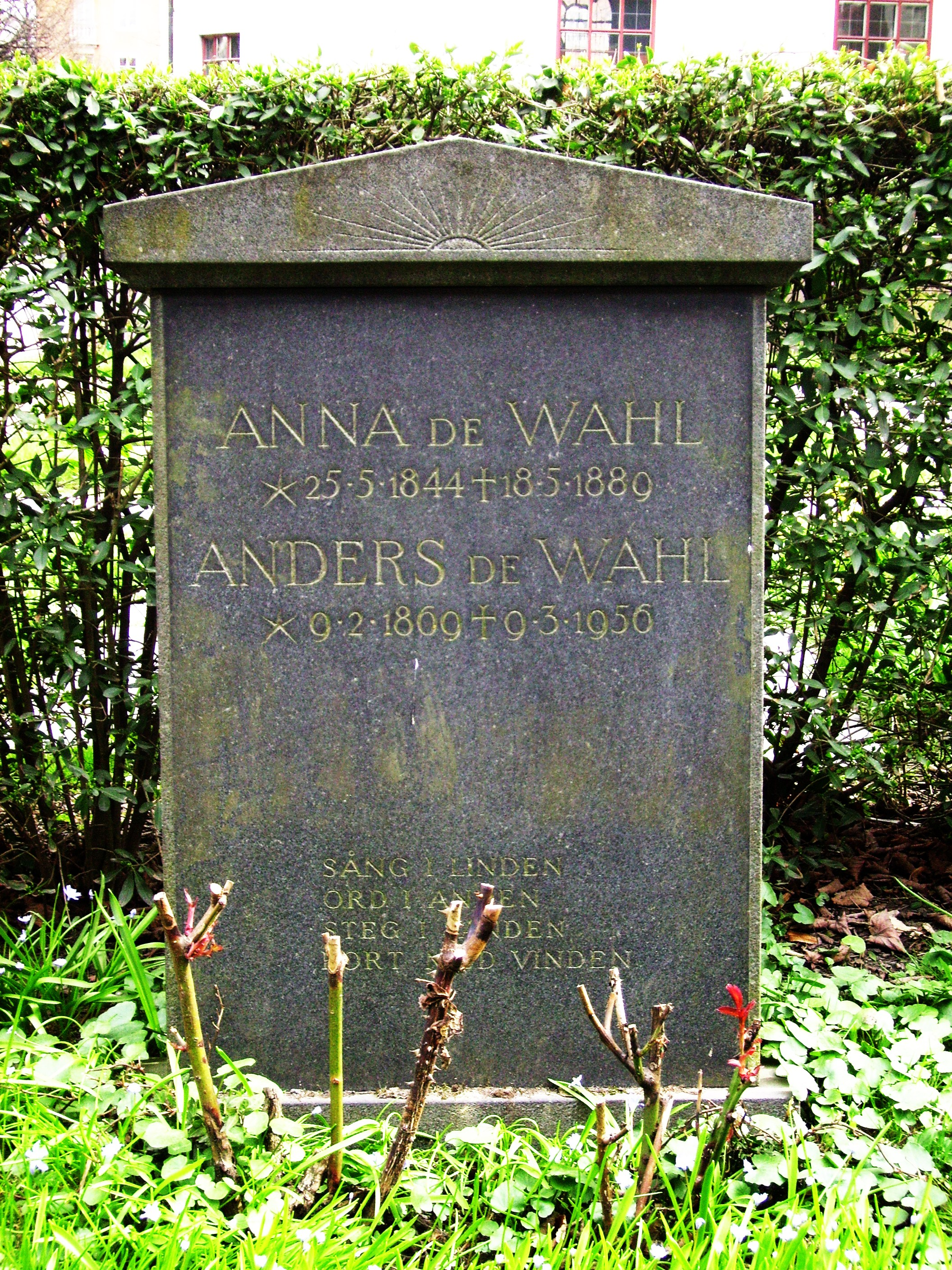
de Wahl's grave at Adolf Fredrik Church in Stockholm
