= The Flying Dutchman (1925 film) =

1925 film

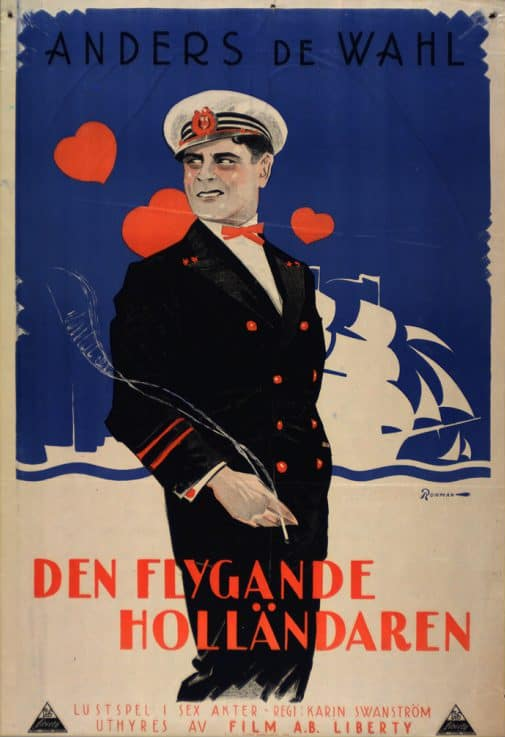
- Directed by: Karin Swanström
- Written by: Hjalmar Bergman
- Starring: Anders de Wahl; Werner Fuetterer; Torsten Hillberg
- Cinematography: Ragnar Westfelt
- Production company: Skandinavisk Film
- Distributed by: Film AB Liberty
- Release date: 12 September 1925
- Running time: 82 minutes
- Country: Sweden
- Languages: Silent; Swedish intertitles

The Flying Dutchman (Swedish: Flygande holländaren) is a 1925 Swedish silent drama film directed by Karin Swanström and starring Anders de Wahl, Werner Fuetterer and Torsten Hillberg.

== Cast ==
- Anders de Wahl as Pelle Frisk
- Werner Fuetterer as Sven
- Torsten Hillberg as Georg
- Margareta Wendel as Beatrice
- Sture Baude as Svensen
- Edit Rolf as Karin
- Edvin Adolphson as Cousin John
- Karin Swanström as Mother Tine
- Emmy Albiin as Grandma

== Bibliography ==
- Gustafsson, Tommy. Masculinity in the Golden Age of Swedish Cinema: A Cultural Analysis of 1920s Films. McFarland, 2014.
- Qvist, Per Olov & von Bagh, Peter. Guide to the Cinema of Sweden and Finland. Greenwood Publishing Group, 2000.
- Wredlund, Bertil. Långfilm i Sverige: 1920-1929. Proprius, 1987.
