= Annie Cooper Boyd =

American painter

- Born: Annie Burnham Cooper; 1864; Sag Harbor, New York
- Died: 1941 (aged 76–77)
- Known for: Painting
- Spouse: William John Boyd (m. 1895)

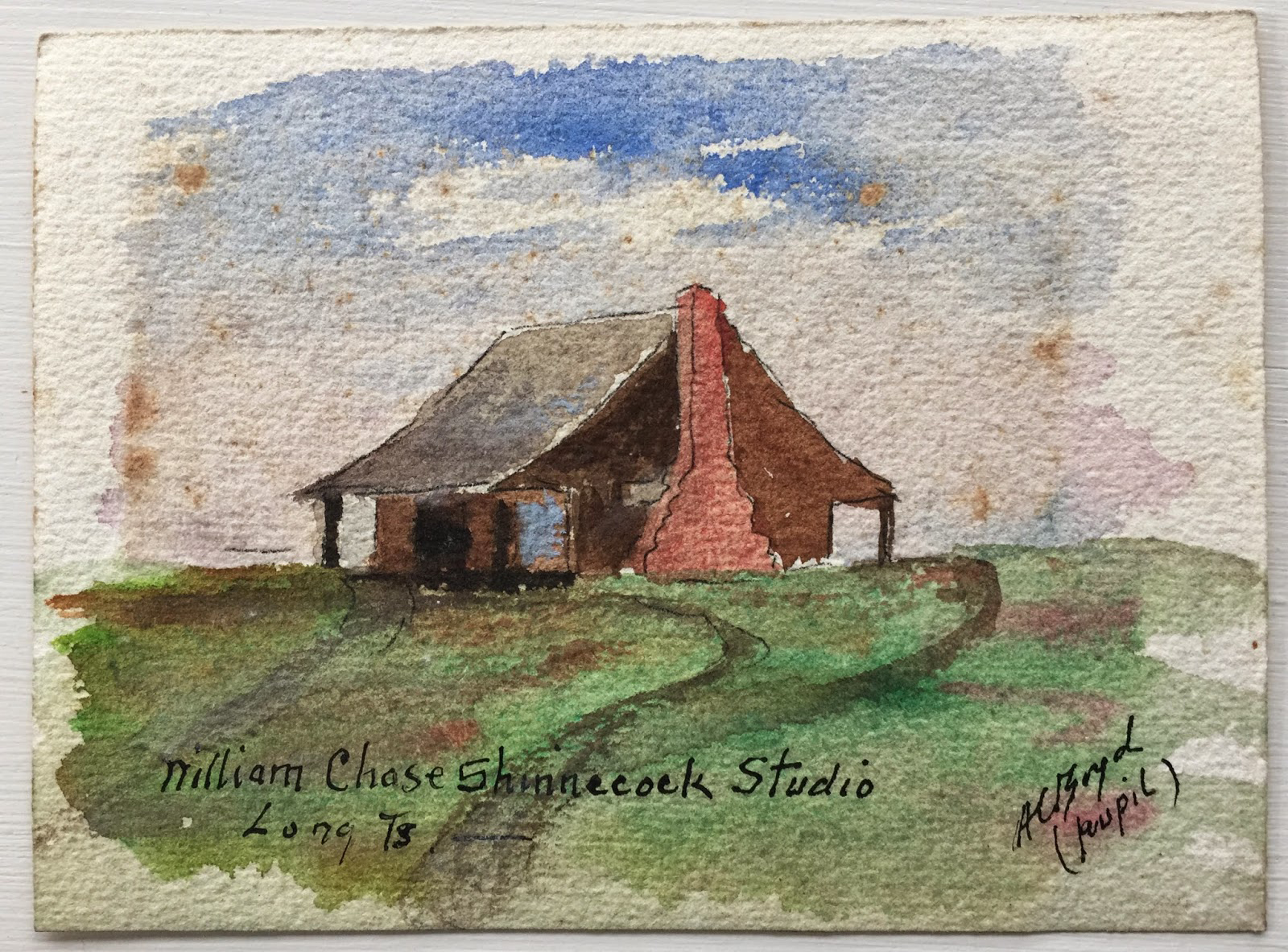
William Chase Shinnecock Studio by Annie Cooper Boyd

Annie Cooper Boyd (1864–1941) was an American feminist, watercolorist and diarist.

== Biography ==
Boyd was born Annie Burnham Cooper in Sag Harbor, New York, the daughter of William Cooper, a prosperous boatbuilder; she was the youngest of eleven children. At the age of 16 she began keeping a diary, which she continued writing well into adulthood. Her father died in 1894, and a year later she married William John Boyd, with whom she moved to Brooklyn; they kept the cottage which her father had willed her in Sag Harbor and used it as a summer home. Their son William was born in 1898, and their daughter Nancy followed three years later. She took lessons from the sisters Henrietta and Virginia Granbery in New York City, and they later visited her in Sag Harbor. She also spent time at the Shinnecock Hills Summer School of Art run by William Merritt Chase, where her teacher was most likely Charles Elmer Langley. Eventually she and her husband returned full-time to live in the cottage in Sag Harbor, where she opened and operated the Herald House Tea Room.

Many of Boyd's paintings are currently held by the Sag Harbor Historical Museum, which is headquartered in her former cottage; the building itself is decorated throughout with paintings as well. Excerpts from her diary, and paintings, have been published as Anchor to Windward: the Diaries and Paintings of Annie Cooper Boyd: written (1880–1935).
