= J. J. Pickle Research Campus =

Campus in Austin, Texas, United States

Coordinates: 30.3866°N 97.7269°W

J.J. Pickle Research Campus

The J. J. Pickle Research Campus (PRC) in Austin, Texas, United States is owned and operated by the University of Texas at Austin. It sits on 475 acres (1.9 km^{2}) in northwest Austin, approximately 9 miles (14 km) north of the main UT campus and just south of the Domain.

== History ==
The original site was only 402 acres (1.6 km^{2}) and only extended as far west as the railroad. It was originally a magnesium plant during World War II and was owned by the United States government. Following the conclusion of the war, the site was declared surplus, and UT engineering professors C. Read Granberry and J. Neils Thompson sought to lease and eventually purchase the site for the University. The lease agreement was reached in 1946, and certain research projects began to be moved to the new campus.

In 1949, with the help of then-Congressman Lyndon B. Johnson, the University purchased the site, then named the Off-Campus Research Center (OCRC), from the federal government. In 1953, it became the Balcones Research Center, so named for the Balcones Escarpment that runs through that part of the city.

Over the years, the University continued to develop the campus, whose tenants made significant contributions to research in the areas of defense, nuclear physics, and space flight. It received a clear title to the property in 1971, and in 1974 purchased another tract of land west of the railroad, bringing the site to its current area.

The University again renamed the campus in 1994, this time for former Congressman and UT alumnus J. J. Pickle. When he was Austin's congressional representative, Pickle was instrumental in bringing major research efforts to the campus. Pickle died in 2005 from prostate cancer and lymphoma, according to his family.

== Campus ==
The Pickle Research Campus is not a full college campus: there are no dormitories, and most classes held there are for working professional programs (such as the Executive Masters program). Other than normal campus operations and a cafeteria / conference center, it is strictly a research facility.

Due to the sensitive nature of some of the research being done at the PRC, it is also a closed campus. On a normal weekday, access to the campus is restricted to University students, faculty, and staff with parking permits, as well as expected guests. After hours or on weekends, access is restricted to approved personnel only. A shuttle runs between the two campuses on weekdays. Many students and some faculty/staff, especially those living in north Austin, opt to park at PRC and ride the shuttle due to the limited parking on the main campus.

Today, the campus houses approximately 100 buildings. Many of the campus's original 29 buildings, most of which were built in the early 1940s, are still in use today. The vast majority of the campus is contained on the original site. Additionally, part of the west tract between Loop 1 and US 183 has been leased to retailers such as Office Depot.

In 2003, the UT System Board of Regents and Simon Property Group reached a $130 million lease agreement under which Simon would build a shopping mall on 46 acres (186,000 m^{2}) of unused PRC land along Loop 1 and across from another Simon Property Group venture - the Domain. Construction on the Arbor Walk began in 2005, with its first retail stores opening in October 2006.

Despite all this, a significant amount of the campus remains undeveloped. While there are roads throughout the campus, many of them border empty plots of land. UT administrators have announced plans to eventually develop the PRC into a full-fledged campus, but they are only preliminary. Visitors will also observe numerous bluebonnets, the Texas state flower, at the PRC. They are visible outside the campus from Burnet Road, but can be found in various places throughout the site.

== Research departments ==
- Applied Research Laboratories - One of the first and largest departments to be located at the PRC.
- Bureau of Economic Geology - The oldest research unit at UT and the Texas state geological survey.
- Texas Advanced Computing Center - Operates the Frontera supercomputer, which ranks 21st in the world (and two others in the top 500).
- Nuclear Engineering Teaching Lab - Operates a fully functional nuclear reactor.
- Center for Aeromechanics Research - Houses a hypersonic Mach 5 wind tunnel.
- Electrical Engineering Research Laboratory (EERL) - Performs research in all forms of electromagnetic wave engineering. This includes radar, wireless communications, SATCOMS, and modeling ICs.
- Microelectronics and Computer Technology Corporation (MCC) - Technology research consortium consisting of 20 hi-tech companies. Currently designated as the West Pickle Research Campus (WPR)
- Center for Electromechanics (CEM) - Research center focusing on electromagnetics, electromechanics, energy storage, and high performance energy conversion
- Center for Energy and Environmental Resources (CEER) - CEER is located in the Electromechanics and Energy Building
- Center for Water and the Environment (CWE) - Carries out advanced research, education, design and planning in water resources and environmental management in Texas, across the United States, and internationally.
- Microelectronics Research Center (MRC) - Houses UT's research in nanoelectronics (CMOS and post-CMOS), optoelectronics, and organic semiconductors. The MRC is home to a state-of-the-art 15,000 sq ft (1,400 m^{2}) cleanroom for device fabrication and is a member of the NSF's National Nanotechnology Infrastructure Network (NNIN).
- Texas Archeological Research Laboratory (TARL) - a nationally recognized archeological research facility and the largest archeological repository in the state.
- Ferguson Structural Engineering Laboratory (FSEL) - Large-scale testing of structural elements including bridge piers, prestressed girders, and composite decks. The FSEL is one of the first research departments introduced to the PRC.

== Bus connections ==
The campus is served via Capital Metro as well, through a stop known as UT Research Campus.

The buses that serve this stop are:

- #466 Kramer
- #803 Burnet/S. Lamar
