= Suzukakedai Station =

Railway station in Machida, Tokyo, Japan

Suzukakedai Station すずかけ台駅

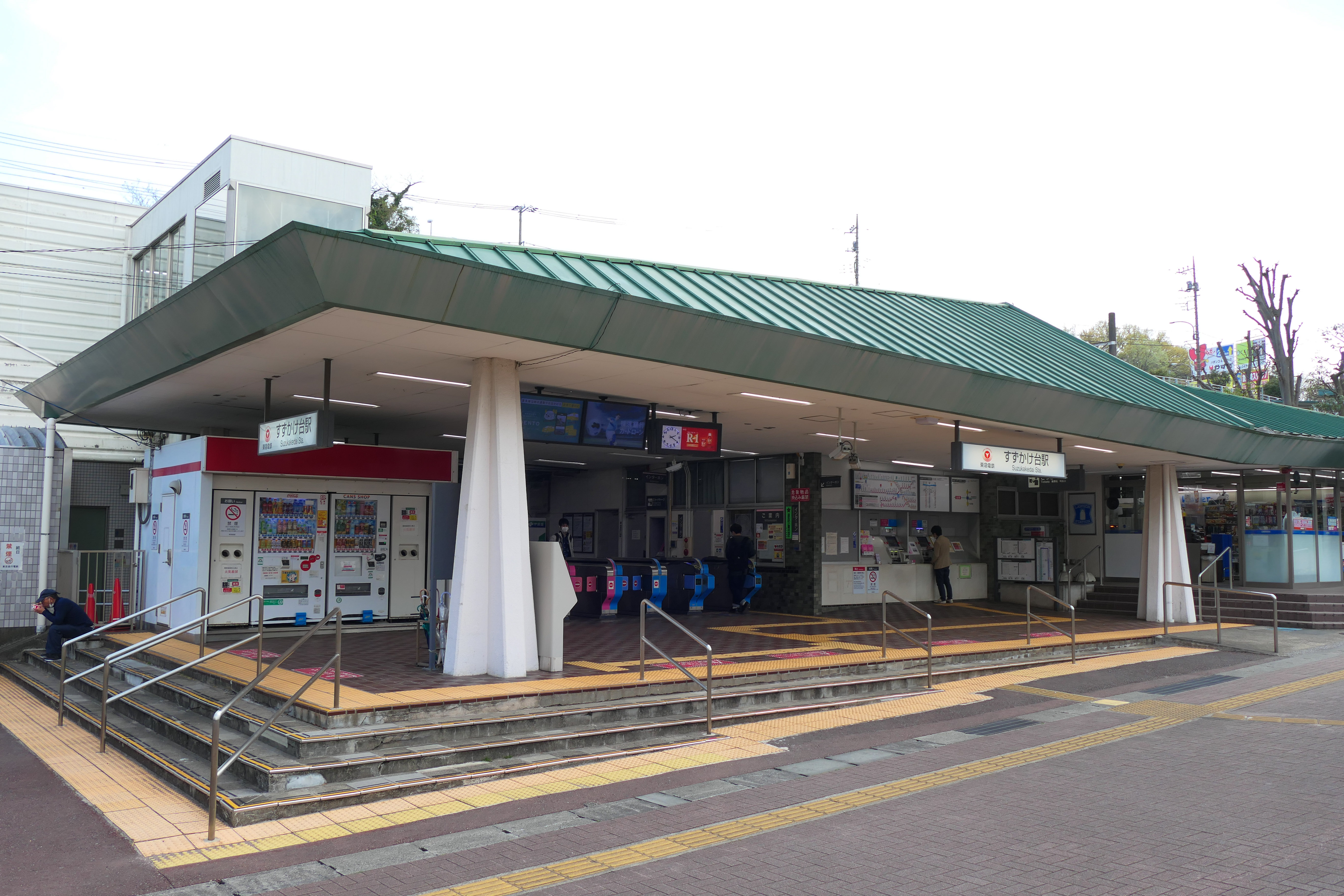
- Suzukakedai Station, April 2021

General information
- Location: 3-1 Minami-tsukushino, Machida City, Tokyo 194-0002; Japan
- Coordinates: 35°31′1″N 139°28′53.3″E
- Operator: Tōkyū Railways
- Line: Den-en-toshi Line
- Distance: 28.0 km (17.4 mi) from Shibuya
- Platforms: 2 side platforms
- Tracks: 2
- Connections: Bus stop

Construction
- Structure type: At grade

Other information
- Station code: DT24
- Website: Official website

History
- Opened: 1 April 1972; 54 years ago

Passengers
- FY 2019: 11,623

Services
Preceding station	Tōkyū Railways	Following station
Minami-machida Grandberry Park towards Chūō-rinkan	Den-en-toshi Line Semi-Express Local	Tsukushino towards Shibuya
Location
- Location within Tokyo Location within Kanagawa Prefecture Location within Japan

Suzukakedai Station (すずかけ台駅, Suzukakedai-eki) is a passenger railway station located in the city of Machida, Tokyo, Japan, operated by Tokyu Corporation.

== Lines ==
Suzukakedai Station is served by the Tōkyū Den-en-toshi Line from Shibuya in Tokyo to Chūō-rinkan, with through services via the Tokyo Metro Hanzōmon Line to and from the Tobu Skytree Line and further onto the Tobu Isesaki and Nikko lines. Located between Tsukushino and Minami-machida Grandberry Park, it is 28.0 km from the terminus of the line at Shibuya.

Only "Local" and "Semi-express" services stop at this station.

== Station layout ==
The station has two opposed ground-level side platforms serving two tracks, connected by an underground passage.

=== Platforms ===
1	Tōkyū Den-en-toshi Line	for Chūō-rinkan
2	Tōkyū Den-en-toshi Line	for Futako-tamagawa and Shibuya; Tokyo Metro Hanzomon Line for Oshiage; Tobu Skytree Line for Tōbu-Dōbutsu-Kōen, Kuki and Minami-kurihashi

== History ==
Suzukakedai Station opened on 1 April 1972.

== Passenger statistics ==
In fiscal 2019, the station was used by an average of 11,623 passengers daily.

The passenger figures for previous years are as shown below.

Fiscal year	Daily average
2005	11,808
2010	11,543
2015	11,437

== Surrounding area ==
- Tokyo Institute of Technology Suzukakedai campus
- Machida Tsukushino Junior High School
- National Route 246

== See also ==
- List of railway stations in Japan
