= Snoopy Museum Tokyo =

Museum in Machida, Tokyo, Japan

- スヌーピーミュージアム
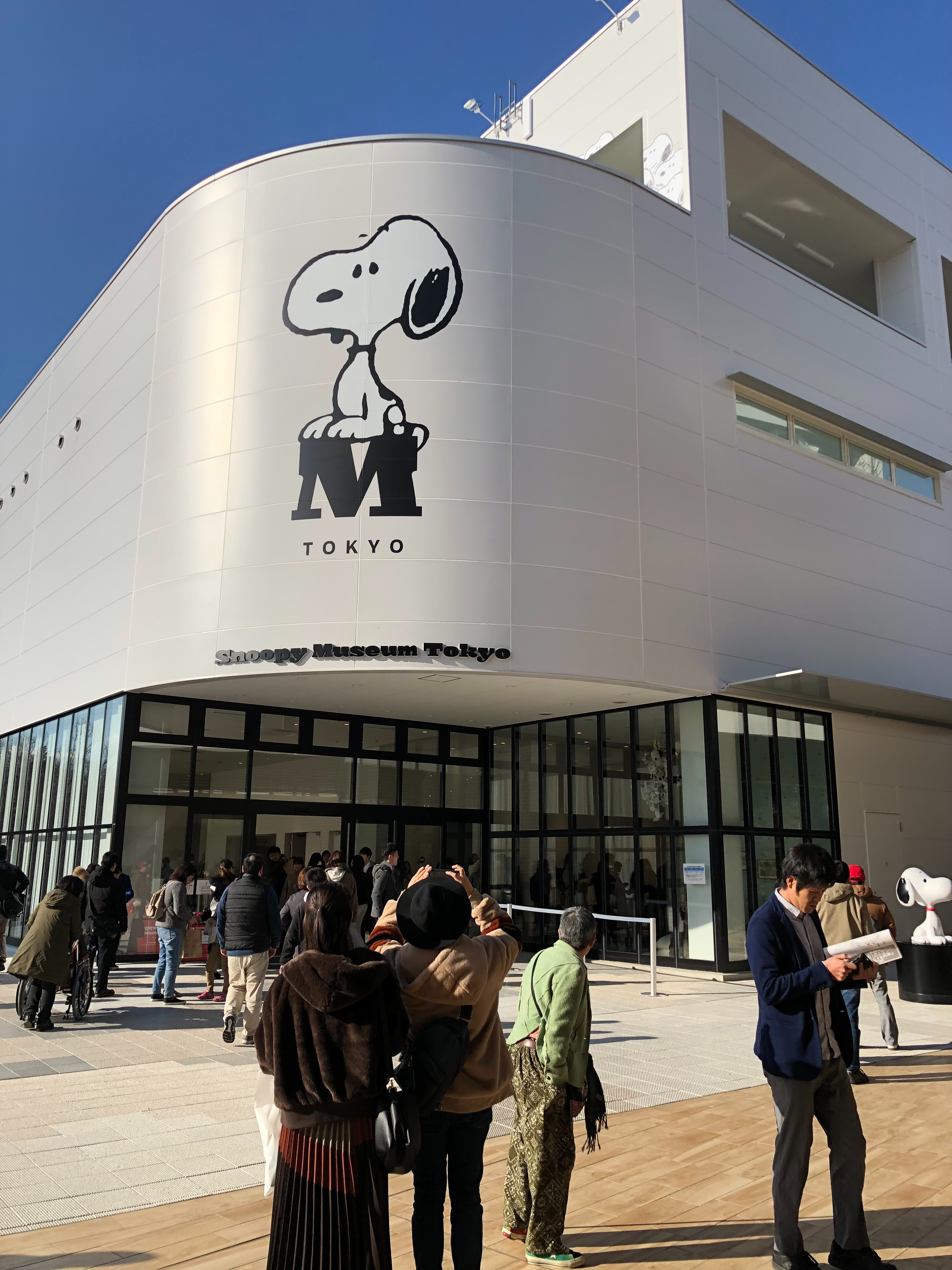
- Established: 23 April 2016 (first time); 14 December 2019 (second time)
- Dissolved: 24 September 2018 (first time)
- Location: Machida, Tokyo, Japan
- Coordinates: 35.5096247°N 139.4697332°E
- Type: Museum
- Owner: Sony Music Entertainment Japan
- Website: Official website

Snoopy Museum Tokyo (スヌーピーミュージアム, Sunūpī Myūjiamu) is a museum in Machida, Tokyo, based on Snoopy and characters from the Peanuts comic strip franchise by Charles M. Schulz.

The museum is owned and operated by Sony Creative Products Inc. (SCP), a wholly owned subsidiary of Sony Music Entertainment Japan that serves as the primary local licensing agent for the Peanuts brand in Japan.

== History ==
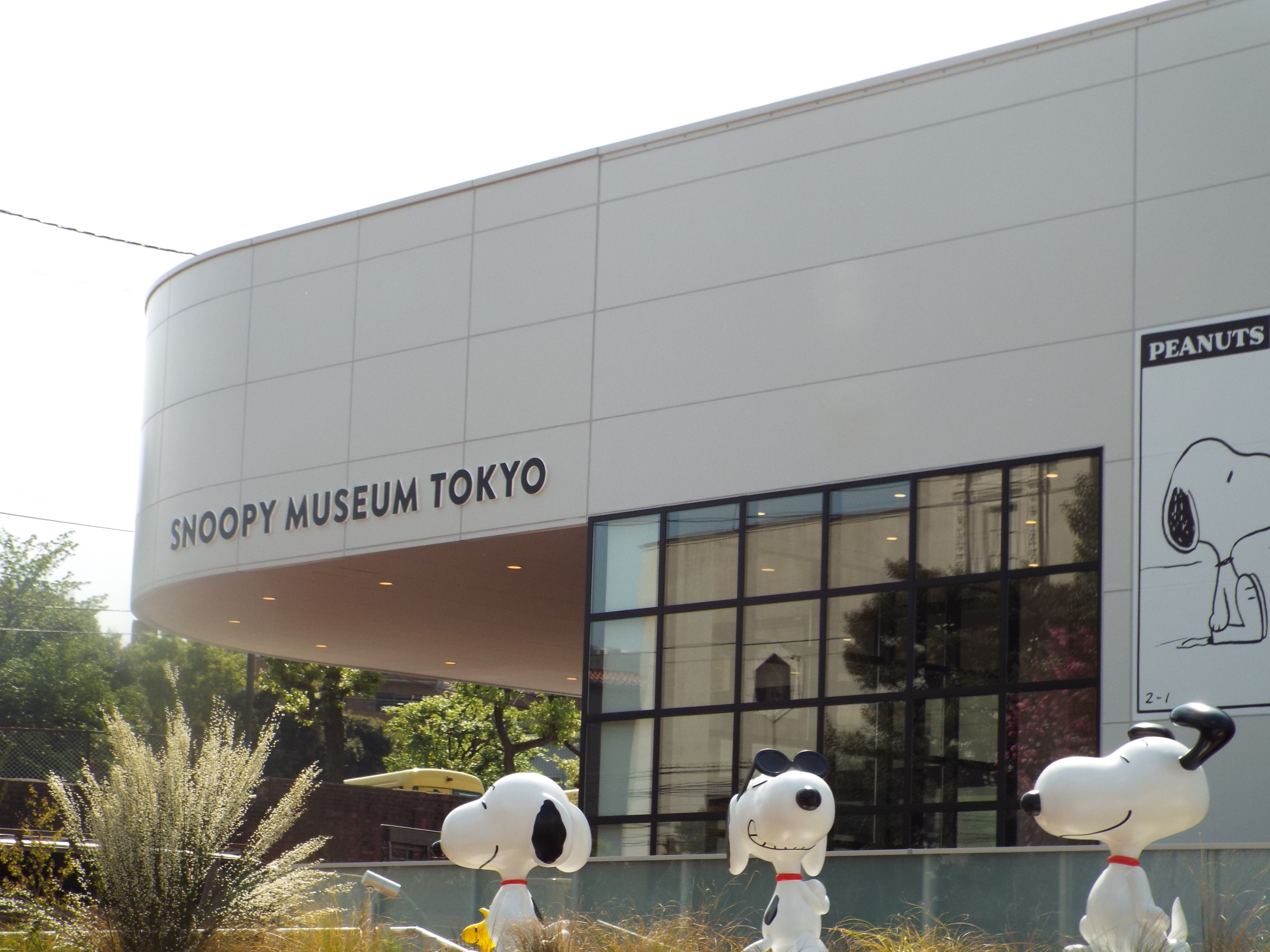
Old museum in Roppongi

The original Snoopy Museum Tokyo opened in Roppongi on 23 April 2016, and attracted almost a million visitors for the next two years. It closed in 2018, the year which also marked the 50th anniversary of Peanuts being first introduced in Japan, after its final exhibition (21 April to 24 September 2018).

The current incarnation of the museum opened at the Minami-machida Grandberry Park in Machida on 14 December 2019, as an official satellite of the Charles M. Schulz Museum and Research Center in Santa Rosa, California. It reopened in February 2024 after renovations.

== Facilities ==
The museum features a gift shop called Brown's Store and the Peanuts Café.

== Transportation ==
The museum is accessible within walking distance of Minami-machida Grandberry Park Station along the Tokyu Railway Den-en-toshi Line. The fastest time to Shibuya Station is 35 minutes on the Express Trains, and the fastest time to Yokohama Station is 40 minutes.

== Publications ==
The museum has published a number of books about its special exhibitions:

- Laugh and Smile (2022)
- Woodstock: The Best and Small Friend (2022)
- Food in Peanuts (2023)
- Lucy is Here (2023)
- Traveling Peanuts (2024)
- Holiday (2024)
- School Life of the Peanuts Gang (2025)

== See also ==
- List of museums in Tokyo
