= Minami-machida Grandberry Park Station =

Railway station in Machida, Tokyo, Japan

Minami-machida Grandberry Park Station 南町田グランベリーパーク駅

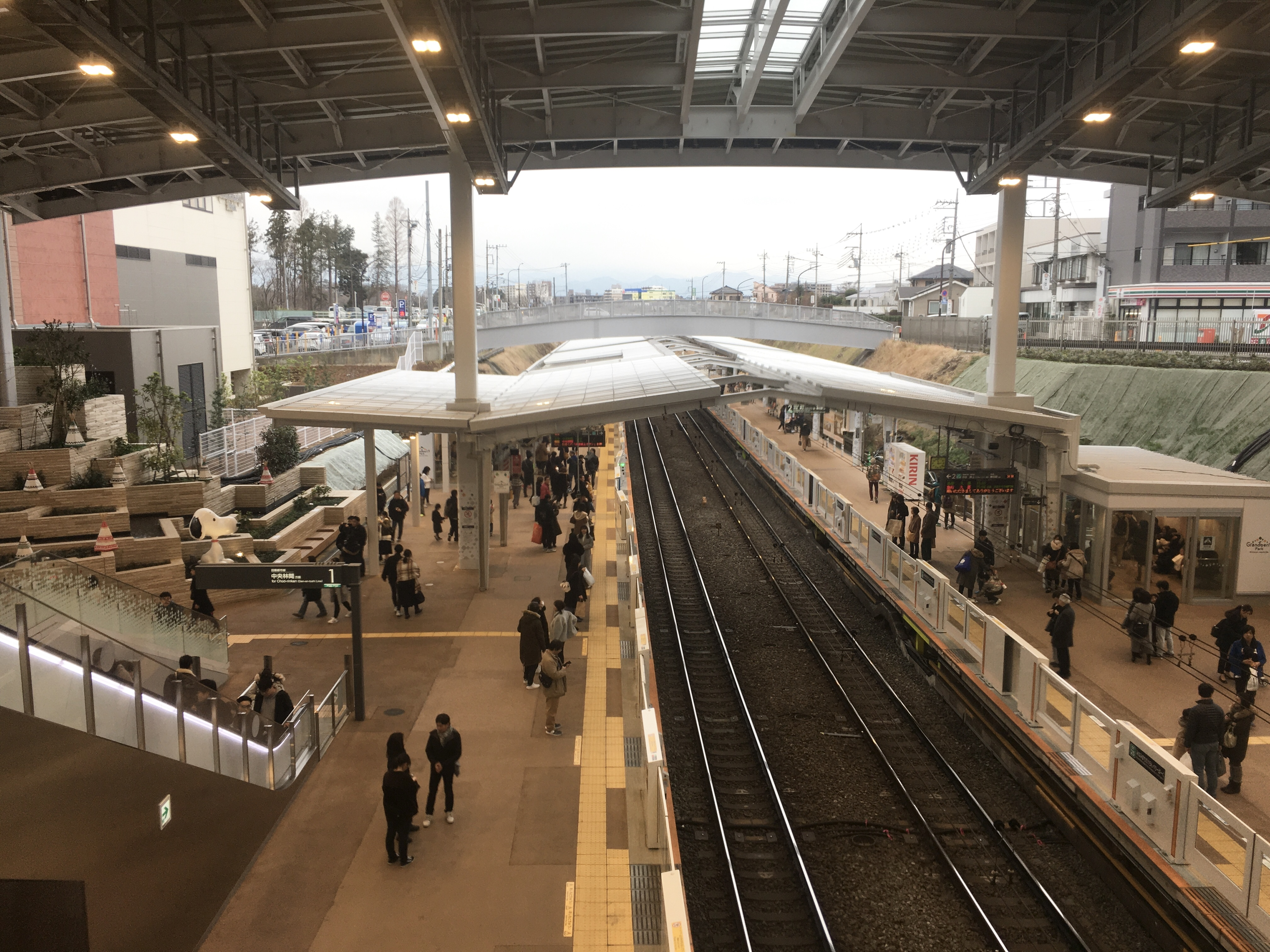

General information
- Location: 3-3-2 Tsuruma, Machida City, Tokyo 194-0004; Japan
- Coordinates: 35.5114°N 139.4708°E
- Operator: Tōkyū Railways
- Line: Den-en-toshi Line
- Distance: 29.2 km (18.1 mi) from Shibuya
- Platforms: 2 side platforms
- Tracks: 2
- Connections: Bus stop

Construction
- Structure type: At grade

Other information
- Station code: DT25
- Website: Official website

History
- Opened: 15 October 1976; 49 years ago
- Former names: Minami-machida Station

Passengers
- FY 2019: 40,084

Services
Preceding station	Tōkyū Railways	Following station
Chūō-rinkan Terminus	Den-en-toshi Line Express	Nagatsuta towards Shibuya
Tsukimino towards Chūō-rinkan	Den-en-toshi Line Semi-Express Local	Suzukakedai towards Shibuya
Location
- Location within Tokyo Location within Kanagawa Prefecture Location within Japan

Minami-machida Grandberry Park Station (南町田グランベリーパーク駅, Minami-Machida Guranberī Pāku-eki) is a passenger railway station located in the city of Machida, Tokyo, Japan, operated by the private railway operator Tokyu Corporation.

== Lines ==
Minami-machida Grandberry Park Station is served by the Tōkyū Den-en-toshi Line from Shibuya in Tokyo to Chūō-rinkan, with through services via the Tokyo Metro Hanzōmon Line to and from the Tobu Skytree Line and further onto the Tobu Isesaki and Nikko lines. Located between Suzukakedai and Tsukushino, it is 29.2 km from the terminus of the line Shibuya.

Before, express trains did not stop on weekdays; however, starting from October 2019, the station changed name to "Minami-machida Grandberry Park" and express trains now stop at this station every day.

== Station layout ==
The station is above-ground and has two opposed side platforms serving two tracks, connected by footbridges. The south exit leads to the Grandberry Park.

=== Platforms ===
1	■ Tokyu Den-en-toshi Line	for Chūō-rinkan
2	■ Tokyu Den-en-toshi Line	for Futako-tamagawa and Shibuya; Tokyo Metro Hanzōmon Line for Oshiage; Tobu Skytree Line for Tōbu-Dōbutsu-Kōen; Tobu Isesaki Line for Kuki; Tōbu Nikkō Line for Minami-kurihashi

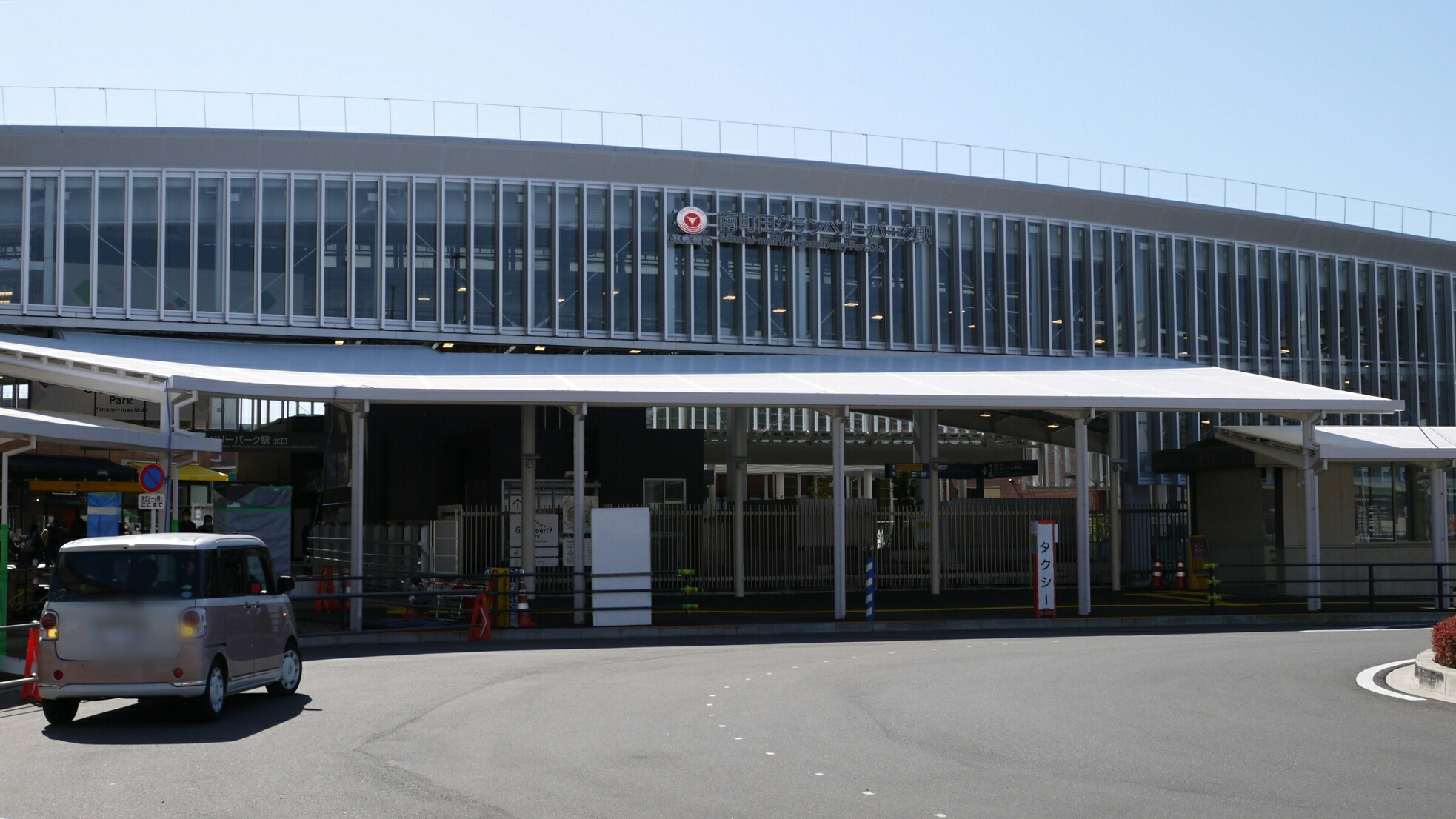
North exit, February 2020

== History ==
Minami-Machida Station opened on 15 October 1976.

On 1 October 2019, the station was renamed to Minami-machida Grandberry Park Station (南町田グランベリーパーク駅, Minami-machida guranberī pāku-eki), and all Express services began stopping here, whereas previously weekday Express services skipped this station.

== Passenger statistics ==
In fiscal 2019, the station was used by an average of 40,084 passengers daily.

The passenger figures for previous years are as shown below.

Fiscal year	Daily average
2005	27,970
2010	31,562
2015	34,030

== Surrounding area ==
- Grandberry Park shopping mall (formerly "Grandberry Mall shopping mall")
- Snoopy Museum Tokyo
- Tokyo Jogakkan College
- Naval Support Facility Kamiseya
- National Route 16
- National Route 246
