= The Mill (1921 film) =

1921 film

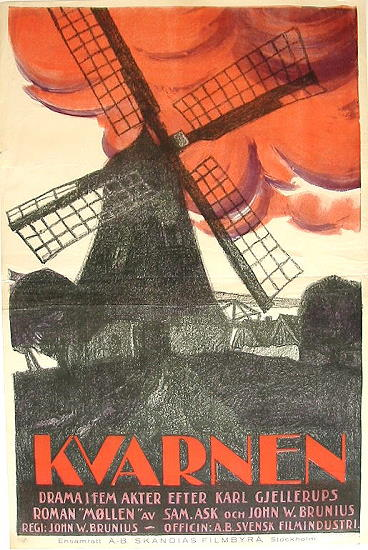
- Directed by: John W. Brunius
- Written by: Karl Gjellerup (novel); Sam Ask; John W. Brunius
- Starring: Anders de Wahl; Emmy Albiin; Gösta Cederlund
- Cinematography: Hugo Edlund
- Production company: Svensk Filmindustri
- Distributed by: Svensk Filmindustri
- Release date: 17 January 1921
- Running time: 108 minutes
- Country: Sweden
- Languages: Silent; Swedish intertitles

The Mill (Swedish: Kvarnen) is a 1921 Swedish silent drama film directed by John W. Brunius and starring Anders de Wahl, Emmy Albiin and Gösta Cederlund. It is based on the 1896 novel Møllen by the 1917 Nobel Prize in Literature winning Danish author Karl Gjellerup. The film's sets were designed by the art director Gustaf Hallén.

== Cast ==
- Anders de Wahl as Jacob Clausen
- Emmy Albiin as Kristina
- Bengt Lindström as Hans
- Clara Kjellblad as Lise
- Ellen Dall as Anne
- Gösta Cederlund as Farm-hand
- Nils Lundell as Lise's Brother
- Gösta Hillberg as Forest Warden

== Bibliography ==
- Hjort, Mette & Lindqvist, Ursula. A Companion to Nordic Cinema. John Wiley & Sons, 2016.
- Sadoul, Georges. Dictionary of Film Makers. University of California Press, 1972.
