= What Do Men Know? =

1933 film

- Directed by: Edvin Adolphson
- Written by: Edvin Adolphson; Hanns H. Fischer; Gösta Stevens; Hertha von Gebhardt
- Produced by: Stellan Claësson
- Starring: Anders de Wahl; Birgit Tengroth; Håkan Westergren
- Cinematography: Julius Jaenzon
- Edited by: Rolf Husberg
- Music by: Sonja Sahlberg; Jules Sylvain
- Production company: Svensk Filmindustri
- Distributed by: Svensk Filmindustri
- Release date: 26 December 1933
- Running time: 97 minutes
- Country: Sweden
- Language: Swedish

What Do Men Know? (Swedish: Vad veta väl männen) is a 1933 Swedish drama film directed by Edvin Adolphson and starring Anders de Wahl, Birgit Tengroth and Håkan Westergren. It was shot at the Råsunda Studios in Stockholm. The film's sets were designed by the art director Arne Åkermark. It is a remake of the German film What Men Know released earlier in the same year.

== Synopsis ==
A travelling salesman has a brief relationship with the daughter of a second hand bookseller. He leaves before either of them learns that she is pregnant.

== Cast ==
- Anders de Wahl as Hjalmar Björklund
- Birgit Tengroth as Margit Björklund
- Håkan Westergren as Gösta Bergman
- Tore Svennberg as Uncle Björnbom
- Margit Manstad as Annie Kron
- Harry Roeck Hansen as Fritz Hellberg
- Nils Wahlbom as Blomkvist
- Constance Gibson as Mrs. Blomkvist
- Marianne Löfgren as Gertrud Blomkvist
- Gull Natorp as Mrs. Holm
- Hilda Borgström as Hedvig
- Emmy Albiin as Old Woman
- Wiktor Andersson as Barker
- Helga Brofeldt as Sales woman
- Martha Colliander as Alma Wickel
- Emil Fjellström as Postman
- Erik Forslund as Waiter
- Knut Frankman as Clerk
- Anna-Lisa Fröberg as Mrs. Möller
- Wictor Hagman as Shop assistant
- Richard Lund as Director Abraham
- Anna Olin as Saleswoman
- Hjalmar Peters as Mr. Norén
- Albert Ståhl as Mr. Möller
- Ruth Weijden as Saleswoman

== Bibliography ==
- Qvist, Per Olov & von Bagh, Peter. Guide to the Cinema of Sweden and Finland. Greenwood Publishing Group, 2000.
