= Tsukushino Station =

Railway station in Machida, Tokyo, Japan

Coordinates: 35°31′39.4″N 139°29′6.4″E

Tsukushino Station つくし野駅

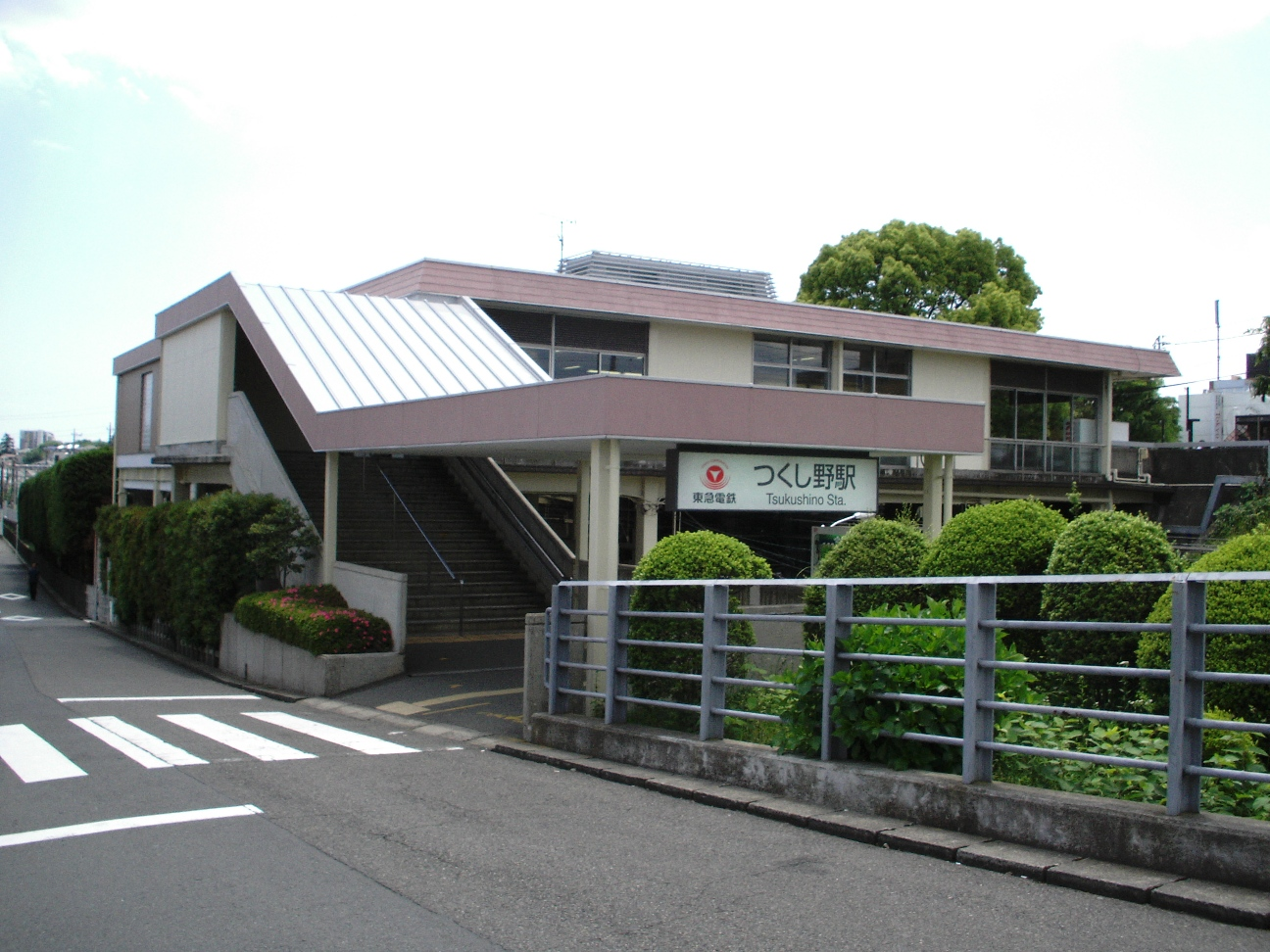
- East entrance, May 2007

General information
- Location: 4-1 Tsukushino, Machida City, Tokyo 194-0001; Japan
- Operator: Tōkyū Railways
- Line: Den-en-toshi Line
- Distance: 26.8 km (16.7 mi) from Shibuya
- Platforms: 2 side platforms
- Tracks: 2
- Connections: Bus stop

Construction
- Structure type: At grade

Other information
- Station code: DT23
- Website: Official website

History
- Opened: 1 April 1968; 58 years ago

Passengers
- FY 2019: 11,544

Services
Preceding station	Tōkyū Railways	Following station
Suzukakedai towards Chūō-rinkan	Den-en-toshi Line Semi-Express Local	Nagatsuta towards Shibuya
Location
- Location within Tokyo Location within Kanagawa Prefecture Location within Japan

Tsukushino Station (つくし野駅, Tsukushino-eki) is a passenger railway station located in the city of Machida, Tokyo, Japan, operated by the private railway operator Tokyu Corporation.

== Lines ==
Tsukushino Station is served by the Tōkyū Den-en-toshi Line from Shibuya in Tokyo to Chūō-rinkan, with through services via the Tokyo Metro Hanzōmon Line to and from the Tobu Isesaki Line. Located between Nagatsuta and Suzukakedai, it is 26.8 km from the terminus of the line at Shibuya.

Only "Local" and "Semi-express" services stop at this station.

== Station layout ==
The station has two opposed side platforms serving two tracks, with an elevated station building located above and perpendicular to the platforms.

=== Platforms ===
1	Tōkyū Den-en-toshi Line	for Chūō-rinkan
2	Tōkyū Den-en-toshi Line	for Futako-tamagawa and Shibuya; Tokyo Metro Hanzomon Line for Oshiage; Tobu Skytree Line for Tōbu-Dōbutsu-Kōen, Kuki and Minami-kurihashi

== History ==
Tsukushino Station opened on 1 April 1968.

== Passenger statistics ==
In fiscal 2019, the station was used by an average of 11,544 passengers daily.

The passenger figures for previous years are as shown below.

Fiscal year	Daily average
2005	12,983
2010	12,271
2015	12,136

== Surrounding area ==
- Machida Tsukushino Elementary School

== See also ==
- List of railway stations in Japan
