= Edvard Stjernström =

Swedish stage actor and theater director

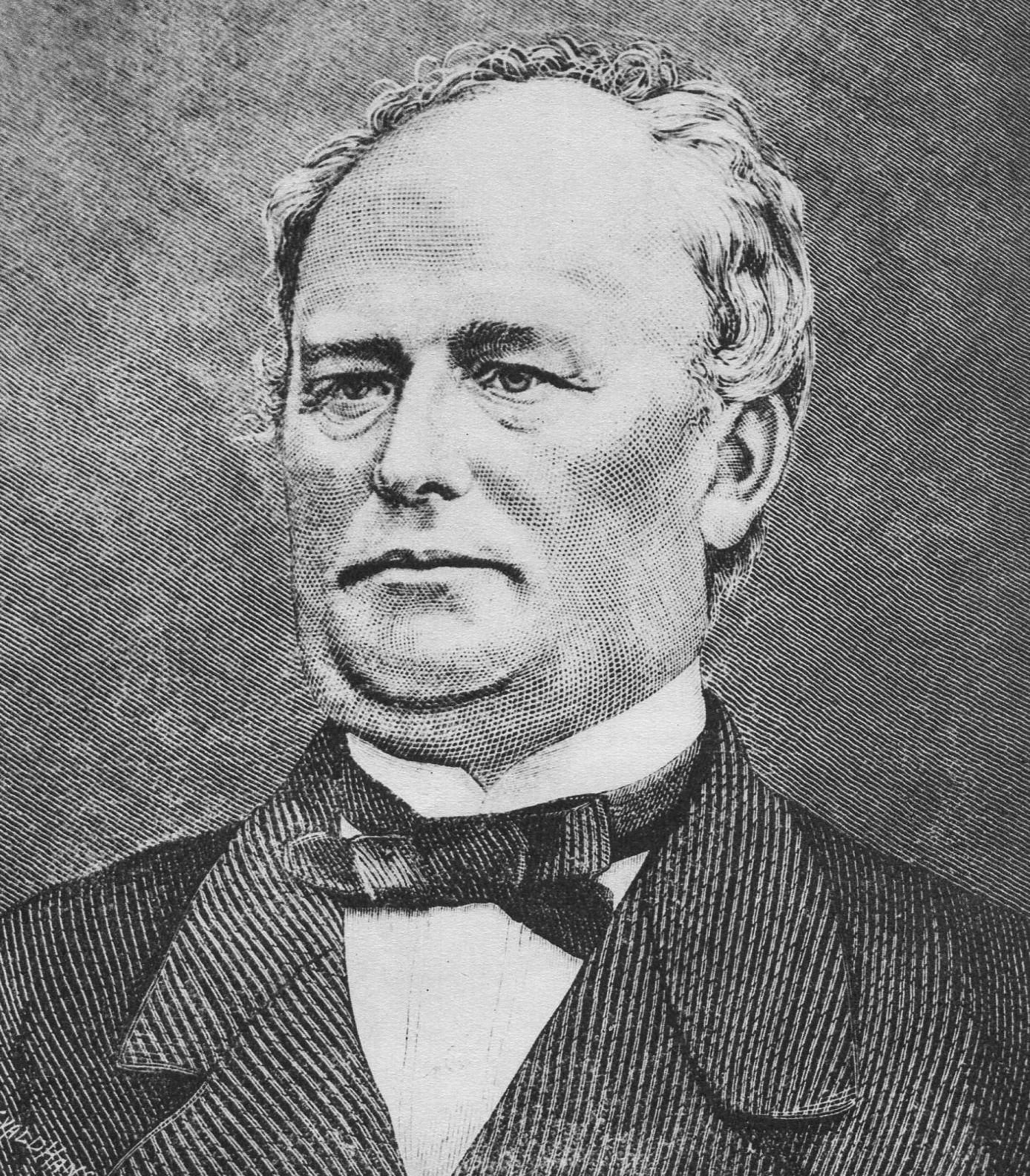
- Born: 11 October 1816; City of Stockholm
- Died: 10 February 1877 (aged 60); Jakob and Johannes parish
- Resting place: Sankt Johannes kyrkogård
- Occupation: Actor, theater manager
- Spouse(s): Jeanette Granberg, Louise Granberg

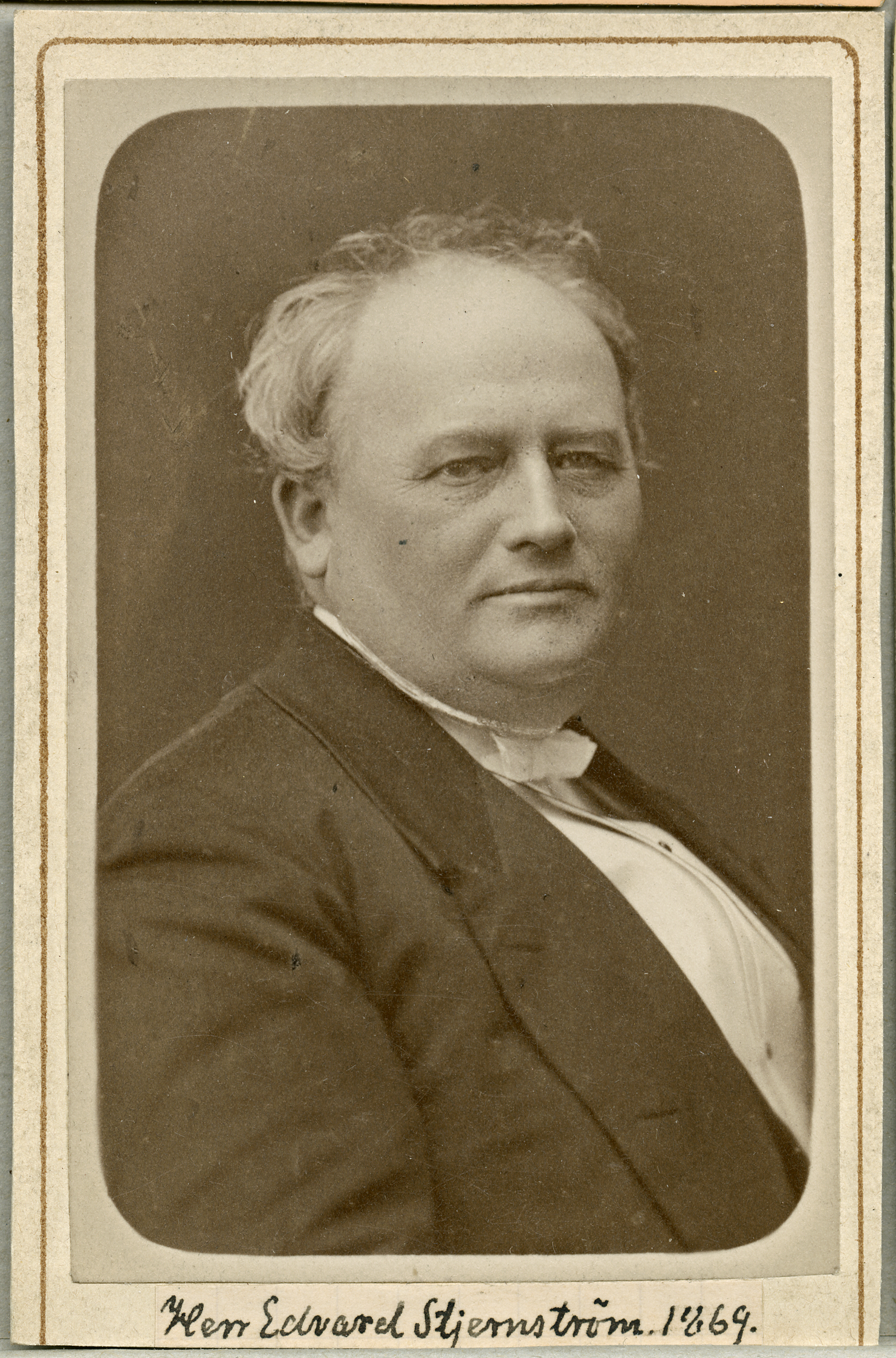
Edvard Stjernström

Carl Edvard Stjernström (11 October 1816 – 10 February 1877) was a Swedish stage actor and theater director.

In 1833, he was accepted as a student at the Royal Dramatic Theatre. From 1842 to 1850, he was employed at Nya Teatern. He was the director of the Stjernström theater Company from 1850 to 1854, director of the Mindre Teatern in Stockholm from 1854 to 1863, and the founder and manager of the Nya Teatern from 1875 to 1877. He played a significant role in 19th-century theatre in both Sweden, where his theater company was regarded to be one of the most prestigious, as well as in Finland, where his theater company was given theatre monopoly to perform from 1850 to 1853.

In 1846, he was married to the actress Sophia Wilhelmina Lamby (1804–1851); in 1854 to the playwright Jeanette Granberg (1825–1857); and in 1861 to her sister Louise Granberg (1812–1907).

== Other sources ==
- Georg Nordensvan (1918). Svensk teater och svenska skådespelare från Gustav III till våra dagar, Andra bandet, 1842-1918.. Stockholm: Albert Bonniers Boktryckeri. ISBN 91-85605-09-3
