= Jeanette Granberg =

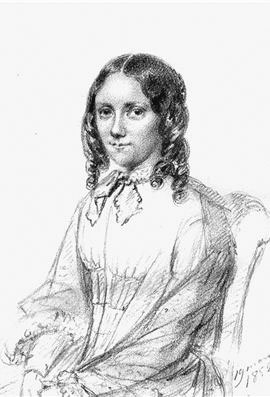
Jeanette Stjernström by Maria Röhl.

Johanna "Jeanette" Charlotta Granberg (19 October 1825 – 2 April 1857), also known by her married name Stjernström and by the pseudonym of Georges Malméen, was a Swedish writer, a playwright, a feminist and a translator, who wrote plays for mainly the theatre Mindre teatern in Stockholm in the mid-19th century. She was praised as a great dramatic by her contemporaries.

== Biography ==
Jeanette was born child of the writer and actor Per Adolf Granberg. She was the sister of playwright and theatre director Louise Granberg. From 1849 and forward, she was active as a translator and a writer of plays for the theatre. She debuted with the play Filantropen in 1847 and several of her plays were performed in the 1850-51 season.

Among her more known plays were Läsarepresten, a play in four acts, Fyra dagar af konung Gustaf III:s lefnad, a historical play in four acts, and Tidningsskrifvaren, a play in five acts, all of which were performed in the Royal Dramatic Theatre in Stockholm. She did not only write alone, but also together with her sister, Louise Granberg. Both siblings used male pseudonyms, Jeanette wrote under the name Georges Malméen. She made great successes with her plays in 1855 and 1857. In Läsareprästen(The vicar), she criticized religious fanaticism in her story about a priest who takes power in a community before the monarch and the people drive him out and reform the society, and in Hos oss eller en motbild till Onkel Toms stuga (At our place or a likeness to Uncle Tom's cabin), she treats the subject of poverty and charity. She was well known to be the author of her plays, but her name was not usually on the posting for the play, as this was considered to be unsuitable for her gender.

== Personal life ==
In 1854, she married the actor Edvard Stjernström, founder of the Swedish Theatre (Stockholm). She died three years after. After her death, her husband married her sister, Louise Granberg who continued as a playwright and eventually became director of the Swedish Theatre. Jeanette Granberg was considered a great dramatic talent and expected to become one of the greatest within her profession, and her death before the age of 32 was seen as a great loss for her profession.

== See also ==
- Alfhild Agrell

== Other sources ==
- Alf Henrikson: Fram till Nybroplan (in Swedish)
- Anteckningar om svenska qvinnor (in Swedish)
- Nordisk familjebok / Uggleupplagan. 26. Slöke - Stockholm (in Swedish)

== Related reading ==
- Österberg, Carin et al (1990) Svenska kvinnor: föregångare, nyskapare (Lund: Signum) (ISBN 91-87896-03-6) (in Swedish)
- Lars Löfgren (2003) Svensk teater (Stockholm: Natur & Kultur) ISBN 91-27-09672-6
- Georg Nordensvan: Svensk teater och svenska skådespelare från Gustav III till våra dagar. Andra bandet 1842-1918 (Stockholm: Albert Bonniers Förlag)
