= Tomas Pousette =

Swedish economist

Dan Tomas Pousette (born 9 September 1950) is a Swedish economist.

== Biography ==
He was born in St. Matthew's Parish in Stockholm on 9 September 1950. Pousette joined the government mortgage institution SBAB in 2003 and was its chief economist from 2007 to 2012, after which he started Pousette Ekonomianalys AB. He is the author of a number of publications.

He has been married to Lisa Pousette (born 1951) since 1976.

== Selected bibliography ==
- Pousette, Tomas (1982) (in English). Technology, pricing and investment in telecommunications. Working paper - Industrial Institute for Economic and Social Research, 0280-1914; 71. Stockholm. Libris 805129
- Jagrén, Lars; Pousette Thomas (1982). Industrins sårbarhet och flexibilitet. Småtryck från IUI, 0443–0409; 130. Stockholm: Industriens utredningsinstitut. Libris 634280
- Jagrén, Lars; Pousette Thomas (1982). Industriföretagets sårbarhet. Forskningsrapport / Industriens utredningsinstitut, 0347-7746; 15. Stockholm: Industriens utredningsinst. Libris 7622635. ISBN 91-7204-156-0
- Pousette, Tomas (1983) (in English). Monopoly and allocative efficiency with stochastic demand. Working paper - Industrial Institute for Economic and Social Research, 0280-1914; 84. Stockholm: IUI. Libris 2448797
- Pousette, Thomas (1983). Datakommunikation i företag. Forskningsrapport / Industriens utredningsinstitut, 0347-7746; 24. Stockholm: Industriens utredningsinst. Libris 7622654. ISBN 91-7204-193-5
- Pousette, Thomas (1986). Hur påverkas industrin av ökade elpriser?. Working paper - Industrial Institute for Economic and Social Research, 0280-1914; 168. Stockholm: IUI. Libris 2060316
- Pousette, Thomas (1986). Efterfrågan på telefontjänster och telefoner: en ekonometrisk studie; Teletjänster - priser och investeringar. Stockholm. Libris 728088
- Jagrén, Lars; Pousette Thomas (1986). Flexibilitet i företag: en studie av arbetsmarknadskonflikten 1985. Stockholm: Industriens utredningsinstitut (IUI). Libris 7622680. ISBN 91-7204-262-1
- Pousette, Tomas (1987) (in English). Services in industry: an international comparison. Working paper - Industrial Institute for Economic and Social Research, 0280-1914; 176. Stockholm: IUI. Libris 688927
- Pousette, Thomas; Nelson Edberg Monica, Olshov Anders (2001). Specialstudie: Mälardalen och Sydvästkusten. Stockholm: Ekonomiska sekretariatet, Nordea. Libris 9141912
- Pousette Thomas, ed (2002). Regional rockad: november 2002. Stockholm: Markets, Nordea. Libris 10441336
- Pousette, Thomas (1976). Efterfrågan på telefontjänster och telefoner: en ekonometrisk studie. Forskningsrapport / Industriens utredningsinstitut, 0347-7746; 6. Stockholm: Industriens utredningsinst. Libris 394244. ISBN 91-7204-064-5
- Pousette, Thomas (1978). Teletjänster - priser och investeringar: en samhällsekonomisk studie. Stockholm: Industriens utredningsinstitut. Libris 7622605. ISBN 91-7204-089-0
