= Louise Granberg =

Swedish playwright, translator and theatre director

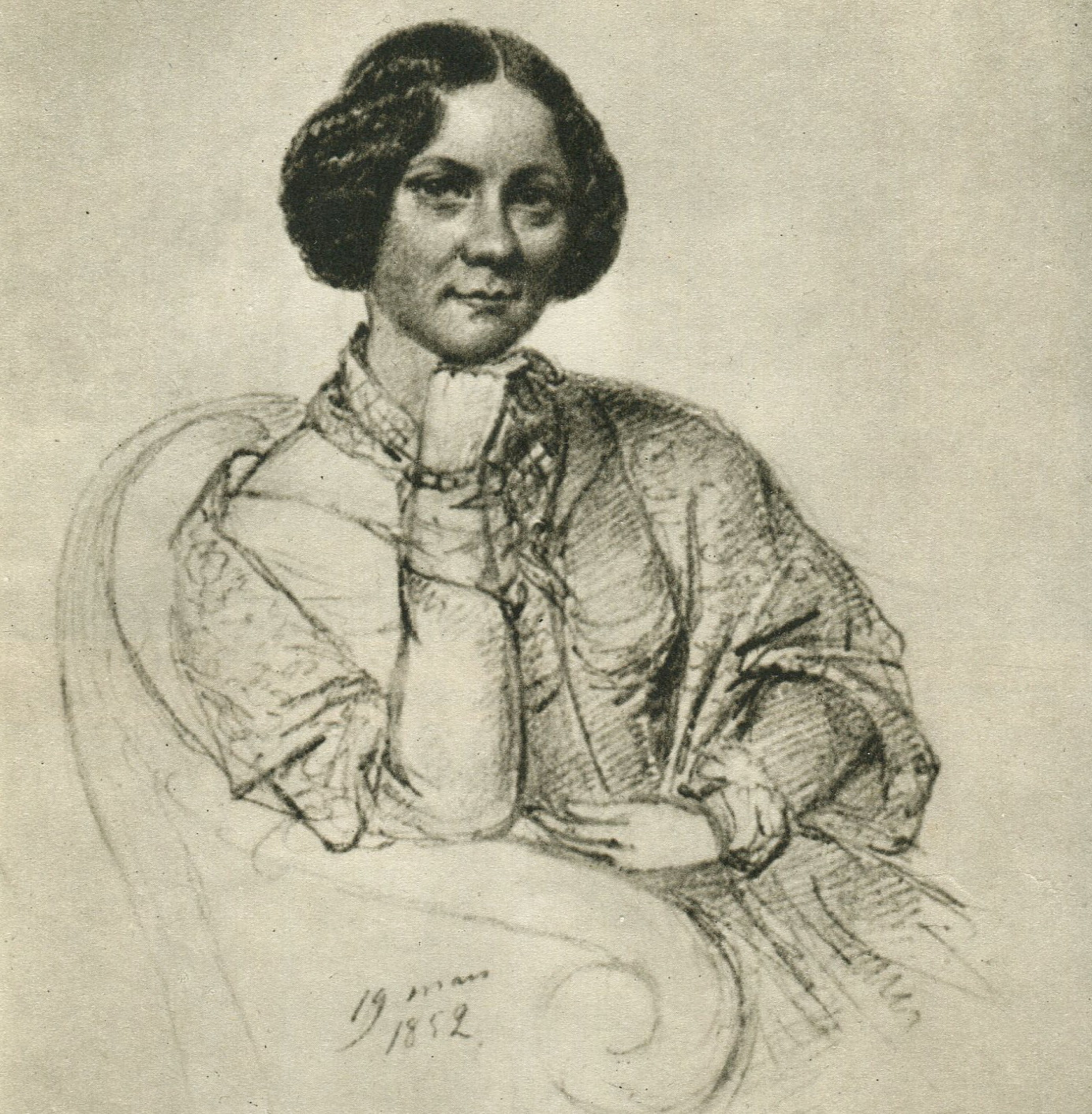
Louise Granberg 1852

Louise Elisabeth Granberg (29 October 1812 – 28 December 1907) was a Swedish playwright, translator and theatre director.

Granberg was born in Stockholm, the daughter of the actor and writer Per Adolf Granberg and Jeanetta Vilhelmina Hedmansson. She was the sister of the playwright Jeanette Granberg (1825–1857). From 1849 forward, she translated and wrote plays, sometimes jointly with her sister, under used the pseudonym Carl Blink.

During the season 1860–61, her play Johan Fredman was staged at Mindre teatern in Stockholm. Tvänne ringar was first performed at the Mindre teatern in 1861 and Familjen Mohrin premiered at the Nya theatre in 1876.

In 1861, she married Edvard Stjernström, founder of the Swedish Theatre (Stockholm) and the widower of her sister. From 1877 to 1880, she was the "very able" director of the theatre.

Louise Granberg died in Stockholm in 1907. She was then 95 years old.

== Other sources ==
- Österberg, Carin et al., Svenska kvinnor: föregångare, nyskapare. Lund: Signum 1990. (ISBN 91-87896-03-6)
- Henrikson, Alf: Fram till Nybroplan
- Nordensvan, Georg: Svensk teater och svenska skådespelare
