= Henrietta Augusta Granbery =

American painter

Henrietta Augusta Granbery (1829–1927) was an American painter.

Granbery and her younger sister, Virginia, were natives of Norfolk, Virginia, but their family moved north when they were young, settling in New York City. Their uncle was the painter George Granbery. They studied painting in New York City while they taught in Brooklyn; Henrietta was an alumna of West's Seminary, where she was later an instructor. She painted mainly landscapes and still lifes, exhibiting annually at the National Academy of Design from 1861 until 1890. She also showed work at the Pennsylvania Academy of the Fine Arts and at the Centennial Exposition in Philadelphia. The sisters, who lived together in Manhattan, continued to teach painting privately; among their pupils was Annie Cooper Boyd.

Granbery's watercolor Peonies in an Oriental Vase from 1891 was included in the inaugural exhibition of the National Museum of Women in the Arts, American Women Artists 1830–1930, in 1987.
