= Oscar de Wahl =

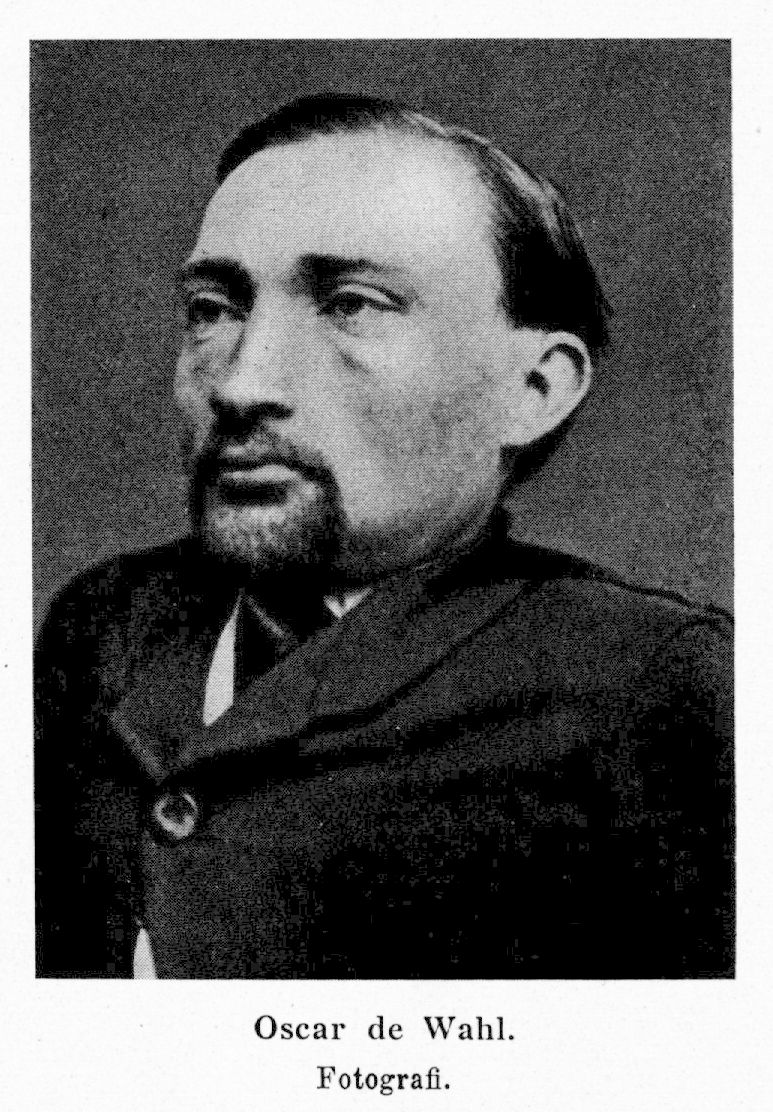
Oscar de Wahl

Oscar de Wahl (7 August 1832 – 29 April 1873) was a Swedish composer and arranger.

== Biography ==
De Wahl was born on 7 August 1832 in Skoklosters socken in the Swedish Uppland. Oscar de Wahl's father Johan de Wahl was a clockmaker, organist and schoolteacher in Skokloster and has been pointed out as the role model for the clockmaker who travels to Stockholm in August Strindberg's poem Stadsresan. De Wahl studied at the Royal Swedish Academy of Music and graduated as music director in 1854. Until 1858 he worked in Stockholm as a piano teacher, and then he was engaged as orchestra leader at the Södra Teatern in Stockholm. In the autumn of 1871 he moved to the Minor Theater, and was active there until his death. He has composed music for several cuplés and arranged the music for various plays.

He died in Stockholm on 29 April 1873.

== Personal life ==
Oscar de Wahl married actress Anna Lundström in 1867, and was the father of actor Anders de Wahl.
