= C. Read Granberry =

Collier Read Granberry was the first Parliamentarian of the Texas House of Representatives. He was born in 1899 in Austin, Texas where he spent the majority of his life as a teacher and civil servant. Granberry served as Parliamentarian of the Texas House of Representatives for nineteen sessions from 1915 to 1962. Along with these responsibilities, Granberry was also a professor of electrical engineering at The University of Texas at Austin from 1926 to 1962. He was married in 1935 to Ruth McMillan with whom he had a son, Larry. Collier Read Granberry died in 1962 and is buried at the Texas State Cemetery.

== Early life and education ==
Collier Read Granberry was born June 29, 1899, and was the son of Marcus Collier Granberry and Jennie Roberta Reed Granberry. Read attended Austin High School and worked as an aid in the Texas Legislature beginning at the age of ten. In 1914, at the request of John Kirby of Houston, Read Granberry was appointed by Lieutenant Governor William P. Hobby to be the Private Secretary to the Speaker of the Texas House of Representatives. In 1915, Speaker John William Woods appointed sixteen-year-old Granberry as the Parliamentarian of the Texas House of Representatives. Granberry's position was viewed as a position of great honor and his position as Private Secretary to the Speaker was considered in the state as a position of some power.

He was president of his high school class and graduated from Austin High School in 1918. He immediately began taking classes for military training for the U.S. Navy at The University of Texas. With the culmination of World War I, Granberry enrolled full-time at the University of Texas in the school of Engineering. He was very active in student organizations as he was a member of the Silver Spurs Service Organization and he served as President of the Student Association. Granberry graduated from the University of Texas in 1924 with a bachelor's degree in electrical engineering.

== Teaching and professional life ==
C. Read Granberry continued to serve as the Parliamentarian of the Texas House of Representatives after graduation. In 1925, using his engineering background, Granberry authored the states first automobile headlight inspection law which basically required all cars in the state of Texas to have functioning headlights. Granberry also worked as an editor for the Texas Legislative Manual.

In 1926 Granberry started work as an instructor in the Engineering School at the University of Texas and eventually became a full professor in 1938. Granberry served in many administrative positions at the university ranging from editor of major university journals to working on the Intercollegiate Athletic Council of Texas. Granberry also worked to secure land for the engineering department that is now the J. J. Pickle Research Campus of the University of Texas. Granberry was also the Assistant to Chancellor Warren of the University of Texas.

== Personal life and Late career ==
Read Granberry married Ruth McMillan on June 29, 1935, at St. David's Episcopal Church in Austin, Texas. Read and Ruth Granberry had one son, Larry Granberry. Read Granberry was a member of the Mason group and was very active in St. David's Episcopal Church in Austin. He was recognized many times by the church for his service and leadership. Granberry continued to teach electrical engineering classes at the University of Texas and also continued to serve in his position as Parliamentarian to the Texas House of Representatives until he died August 21, 1962.
