= Virginia Granbery =

American painter

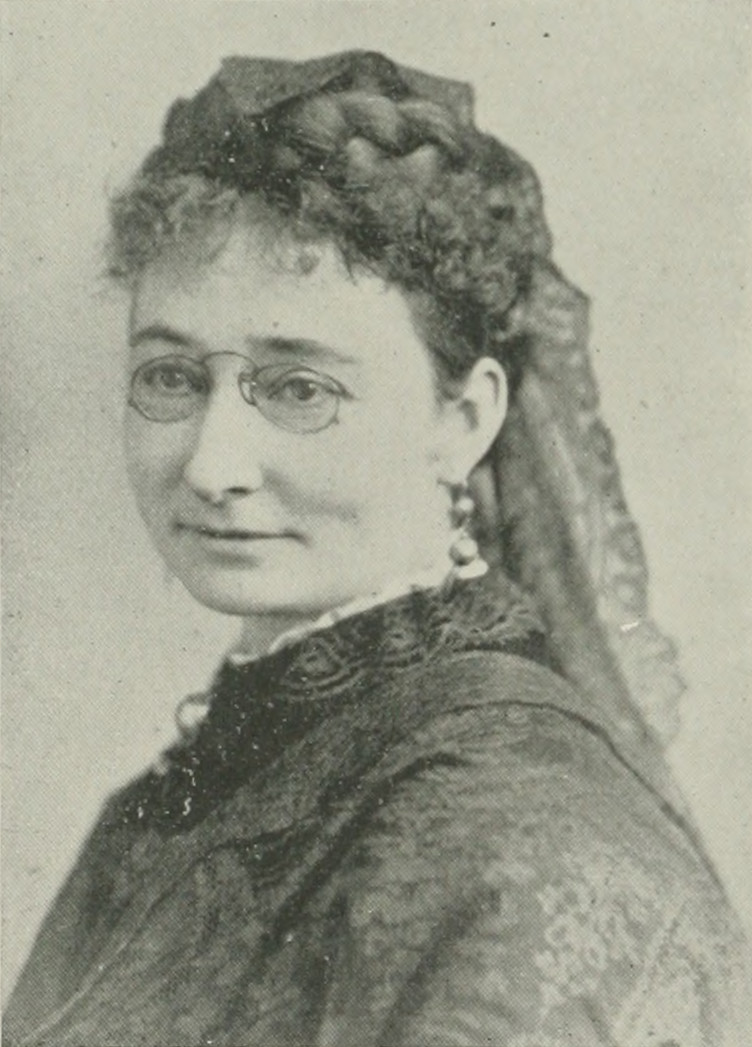
- Born: 1831
- Died: 1921 (aged 89–90)
- Education: Packer Collegiate Institute; Cooper Union; National Academy of Design
- Occupation: painter

Virginia Granbery (1831–1921) was an American painter.

Granbery and her elder sister, Henrietta, were natives of Norfolk, Virginia, but their family moved north when they were young, settling in New York City. Their uncle was the painter George Granbery. They studied painting in New York City while they taught in Brooklyn; Virginia studied at the Packer Collegiate Institute. She later had lessons at the Cooper Union with Albert Fitch Bellows and at the National Academy of Design. The sisters lived together in Manhattan, and continued to teach painting privately; among their pupils was Annie Cooper Boyd.

Virginia Granbery was especially known for her fruit paintings, the majority of which have been lost; in her day, more of hers were reproduced by Louis Prang as lithographs than were those of any other artist. She also painted portraits, landscapes, and animals. She taught at the Packer Institute for some time, where the art department more than doubled under her direction, and may have left New York City after 1890.

She exhibited work at the National Academy of Design from 1859 to 1890; the Pennsylvania Academy of the Fine Arts from 1860 to 1889; and the Brooklyn Art Association from 1861 to 1886, and with her sister showed work at the Centennial Exposition in Philadelphia in 1876.
