= Anders de Wahl =

Swedish actor

- Born: 9 February 1869; Stockholm, Sweden
- Died: 9 March 1956 (aged 87); Stockholm, Sweden
- Occupation: actor
- Years active: 1890–1953

Anders de Wahl (9 March 1869 – 9 March 1956) was a Swedish actor.

== Biography ==
He was the son of the music director Oscar de Wahl (1832–1873) and opera singer Anna Lundström de Wahl (1844–1889). de Wahl was a student at the Royal Dramatic Theatre in 1889–91, employed by the August Lindberg Theater Company 1891–92, at the Albert Ranft Theater Company 1892–1907 and at the Royal Dramatic Theatre 1907–19. He was mostly an actor of the stage but appeared in several roles in films between 1920 and 1946.

== Selected filmography ==
- Erotikon (1920)
- The Mill (1921)
- Kalle Utter (1925)
- The Flying Dutchman (1925)
- What Do Men Know? (1933)
- Med folket för fosterlandet (1938)
- Hans Majestät får vänta (1945)
- Eviga länkar (1946)

== Other sources ==
- Wennerholm, Eric (1974) Anders de Wahl : människan bakom maskerna (Stockholm: Albert Bonniers) ISBN 9100393940
