= Barabbas (disambiguation) =

Barabbas was a biblical figure.

Barabbas may also refer to:

- Barabbas (1953 film), a Swedish film directed by Alf Sjöberg
- Barabbas (1961 film), an American film directed by Richard Fleischer
- Barabbas (2012 film), an Italian film directed by Roger Young
- Barabbas (novel), a 1950 novel by Pär Lagerkvist
- Barabbas (play), a 1928 play by Belgian dramatist Michel de Ghelderode
- Barabbas, A Dream of the Word's Tragedy, an 1893 novel by English writer Marie Corelli

== See also ==
- Barabas (disambiguation)
- Barrabas (disambiguation)
- Bar-Abba (disambiguation)
- Barabba, South Australia
