= Barabbas (2012 film) =

2012 US-Italian television movie by Roger Young

- Based on: Barabbas by Pär Lagerkvist
- Screenplay by: Salvatore Basile; Nicola Lusuardi; Francesco Scardamaglia
- Directed by: Roger Young
- Starring: Billy Zane; Hristo Shopov; Filippo Nigro; Cristiana Capotondi; Anna Valle
- Theme music composer: Paolo Vivaldi; Filippo Rizzello; Federico Scardamaglia; Francesco Scardamaglia
- Original language: English

Production
- Producer: Paola Pannicelli
- Cinematography: Vincenzo Carpineta
- Editor: Alessandro Lucidi
- Running time: 200 minutes
- Production company: Compagnia Leone Cinematografica

Original release
- Release: December 28, 2012

Barabbas (Italian: Barabba) is a 2012 American-Italian television movie directed by Roger Young.

== Cast ==
- Billy Zane as Barabbas
- Cristiana Capotondi as Ester
- Filippo Nigro as Pontius Pilate
- Anna Valle as Claudia Procula
- Tommaso Ramenghi as Dan
- Matteo Branciamore as Judas
- Hristo Shopov as Kedar
- Marco Foschi as Jesus
- Paolo Seganti as Valerius Flaccus
- Franco Castellano as Peter
- Giampiero Judica as Jezer
- Valentina Carnelutti as Mary

== See also ==
- Barabbas (1953)
- Barabbas (1961)
- List of Easter films
