= Barrabas =

Barrabas or Barrabás are the Spanish and Portuguese name for Barabbas, the prisoner who, according to the New Testament, was chosen by the crowd in Jerusalem, over Jesus of Nazareth, to be pardoned and released by Roman governor Pontius Pilate at the Passover feast.

It may also refer to:

- Barrabás, a Spanish music group
  - Barrabás (album), 1977 album by the band
- Barrabas (film), 1920 French silent crime thriller
- Barrabás (magazine), Spanish satirical magazine
- Barrabas (wrestler), Puerto Rican WWC wrestler
- Barrabas, racehorse that won the Prix Ganay in 1930
- Barrabas, 1986 comic title by Slave Labor Graphics
- Gabriel Jaime Gómez Jaramillo (born 1959), known as Barrabás, Colombian football player

== See also ==
- Barabas (disambiguation)
- Barabbas (disambiguation)
- Barnabas (disambiguation)
