= The Dolorous Passion of Our Lord Jesus Christ =

Book by Anne Catherine Emmerich

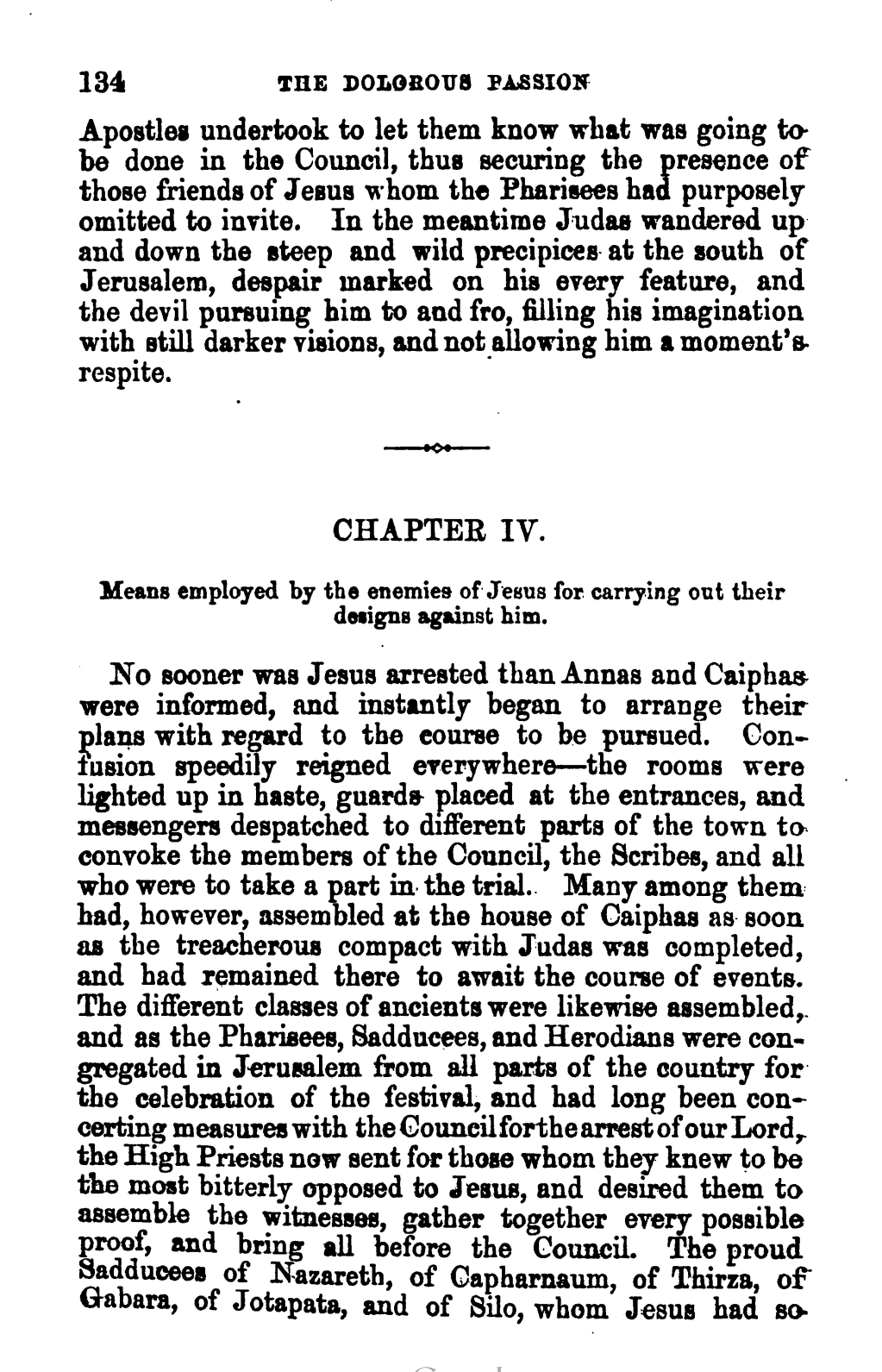
- Excerpt from the book
- Author: Anne Catherine Emmerich
- Genre: Christian literature, Visionary literature
- Publication date: 1833
- Publication place: Germany

The Dolorous Passion of Our Lord Jesus Christ According to the Meditations of Anne Catherine Emmerich, often shortened to The Dolorous Passion of Our Lord Jesus Christ, is a book published in 1833, based on the visions of Anne Catherine Emmerich, a German Roman Catholic mystic and stigmatic. The visions she experienced on the Passion of Jesus were recorded and compiled by Clemens Brentano, a German romantic poet and writer, who compiled them for the book.

The Dolorous Passion quickly became a popular book following its publication, and it has been translated into many languages. The book has been praised for its vivid descriptions of the Passion, and it has been used by many people to deepen their understanding of the meaning of Christ's sacrifice.

The book was a major source for the 2004 film The Passion of the Christ by Mel Gibson.

== Background ==
In 1812, Emmerich was bedridden with a debilitating illness. During this time, she began to have visions of the Passion of Jesus. She described these visions in great detail to her assistant, Clemens Brentano, who later wrote them down.

Clemens Brentano established acquaintance with Anne Catherine Emmerich in 1818 and diligently positioned himself at the bedside of the stigmatist, meticulously transcribing her dictations until 1824. Following Emmerich's death, Brentano meticulously curated an index comprising her extensive corpus of visionary experiences and divine revelations, which subsequently formed the basis for the publication of The Dolorous Passion of Our Lord Jesus Christ in 1833.

== Summary ==
Based on the visions of Anne Catherine Emmerich, The Dolorous Passion of Our Lord Jesus Christ presents a detailed and chronological depiction of the events surrounding the suffering, death, and resurrection of Jesus, as interpreted through Emmerich’s mystical experiences.

Prelude to the Passion:

The narrative opens with events leading up to the Passion, including the raising of Lazarus, which in Emmerich's account intensifies opposition from the Sanhedrin. Other episodes include the anointing of Jesus at Bethany by Mary of Bethany and His Triumphal Entry into Jerusalem, followed by His public teachings and the cleansing of the Temple—actions portrayed as contributing to the growing hostility of religious authorities.

Holy Thursday:

Emmerich describes the preparation for the Passover in the Cenacle, the Last Supper—where Jesus is said to institute the Holy Eucharist using a chalice of ancient origin—and the washing of the disciples’ feet. Judas Iscariot's departure after receiving communion is depicted as the beginning of his betrayal.

Gethsemane and Arrest:

In the Garden of Gethsemane, Jesus undergoes intense spiritual anguish, described in vivid terms including sweating blood. Despite His distress, His closest followers fall asleep. He is arrested following Judas's identifying kiss. Emmerich emphasizes Jesus's divine authority in this moment and includes the detail of Peter drawing a sword to defend Him.

Trials:

Jesus is brought before a sequence of authorities: Annas, Caiaphas, the Sanhedrin, and the Roman governor Pontius Pilate. According to Emmerich, Pilate is hesitant, especially after a dream warning received by his wife. Nonetheless, Jesus is sent to Herod Antipas, mocked, and then returned to Pilate. Under pressure from the crowd and religious leaders, Pilate offers the release of either Jesus or Barabbas, and ultimately consents to the crowd's demand.

Scourging and Condemnation:

The narrative describes a brutal scourging and the mocking of Jesus by soldiers, including a crown of thorns, a reed for a scepter, and a scarlet robe. Pilate presents Him to the crowd as "Ecce Homo" ("Behold the man"), but they continue to call for crucifixion. Pilate symbolically washes his hands and hands Jesus over for execution.

The Way of the Cross:

Jesus carries His cross through Jerusalem toward Golgotha, falling several times. Key moments include encounters with His mother Mary, Simon of Cyrene assisting with the cross, and Veronica wiping His face, said to have received an image of His features on her veil.

Crucifixion and Death:

At Golgotha, Jesus is crucified between two others. Emmerich's account includes details such as His Seven Last Words, the repentance of the so-called “good thief,” and the presence of Mary and John at the cross. His death is described as being marked by supernatural signs—darkness, an earthquake, and the tearing of the Temple veil. A Roman soldier pierces His side, from which blood and water are said to flow.

Burial and Holy Saturday:

Jesus’s body is taken down and mourned, especially by Mary, mother of Jesus. It is then prepared for burial by Joseph of Arimathea and Nicodemus and placed in a new tomb, which is sealed and guarded. Emmerich recounts that on Holy Saturday, Jesus's soul descends to the realm of the dead to liberate righteous souls from earlier times.

Resurrection and Aftermath:

According to the visions, Jesus rises from the dead on Sunday morning. An angel is said to roll away the stone, causing fear among the guards. Jesus appears first to His mother, then to Mary Magdalene—who is told not to touch Him ("Noli me tangere")—and later to other women. Peter and John find the tomb empty. Emmerich concludes with accounts of the authorities’ attempts to cover up the event and the growing faith among Jesus’s followers.

== Impact ==
One particular vision revealed by Brentano played a crucial role in the later identification of the purported House of the Virgin Mary in Ephesus by Abbé Julien Gouyet, a French priest, in 1881.

The book played a significant role as a primary source of inspiration for the 2004 film The Passion of the Christ, directed by Mel Gibson. The depth of Emmerich's descriptions provided a crucial foundation for the cinematic portrayal of Jesus Christ's passion, contributing to the emotional intensity and realism that became characteristic of Gibson's critically acclaimed film.
