= Eduard Kuznetsov =

Eduard Kuznetsov may refer to:

- Eduard Kuznetsov (dissident) (1939–2024), Soviet dissident, human rights activist
- Eduard Kuznetsov (politician) (born 1967), Russian politician
- Eduard Kuznetsov (pilot) (1928–2007), Soviet test pilot, Hero of the Soviet Union
