= Amman Citadel Inscription =

Ammonite inscription

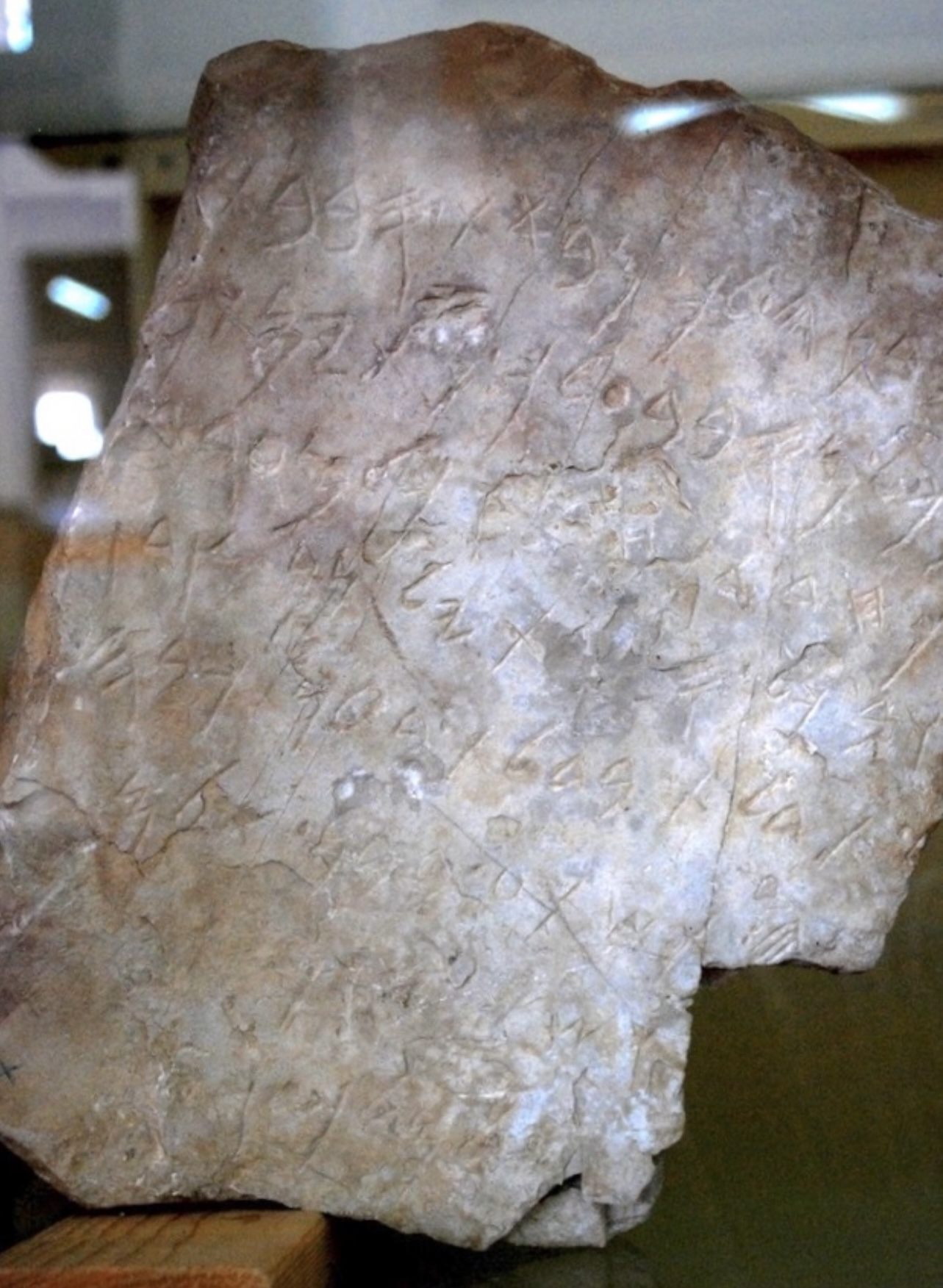
- Material: Limestone
- Writing: Ammonite language
- Created: late 9th century BCE
- Discovered: 1961
- Present location: Jordan Archaeological Museum
- Identification: J 9000

The Amman Citadel Inscription is the oldest known inscription in the so-called Ammonite language. It was discovered in 1961 in the Amman Citadel, and first published in full in 1968 by Siegfried Horn. At the time of its discovery it was the third longest Semitic stone inscription ever found in the Southern Levant, after the Mesha Stele and the Siloam inscription. The inscription is known as KAI 307. As of 1969, the inscription was on display at the Jordan Archaeological Museum.

== Description ==
The inscription is carved into a white limestone block of approximately 26 × 19 cm (10" × 7½") in size, with parts of the inscription lost. Most letters are clearly visible, and the stone has few traces of erosion and was therefore probably not exposed to the elements.

The inscription contains eight lines. The left and right sides of the inscription are missing parts, and the bottom line does not seem to include the end of the inscription. The top line is thought to be the beginning of the inscription since there is space above it.

In the eight lines, 93 letters are shown, which are interpreted to be spread between about 33 words. The size and shape of individual letters vary considerably, suggesting that the inscription comes from a novice scribe. Numerous letters have unusual shapes, for example the ḥēt has only two cross beams, compared to the usual three (𐤇), similar to the Mesha stele. The ṭēt is only a crossbar in a circle (instead of the usual 𐤈), and the ʿayin is already slightly open upwards (𐡏 instead of 𐤏), which occurs in Phoenician inscriptions only from the 5th century.

It is understood to be a building inscription, although due to the fragmented nature of the inscription, the translation remains uncertain. The reconstruction by William Fulco assumes that the inscription concerns the Ammonite chief deity Milcom, restoring a single missing letter to form the name.

== Text ==
Inscription of Tel Siran
Inscription	Original (Phoenician alphabet)	Hebrew alphabet transliteration	Latin alphabet transliteration	English translation (Fulco 1978)
Line 1	[...]𐤋𐤊𐤌.𐤁𐤍𐤄.𐤋𐤊.𐤌𐤁𐤀𐤕.𐤎𐤁𐤁𐤕[𐤌...]	[...] מ]לכם . בנה . לך . מבאת . סבבת...]	[...m]lkm.bnh.lk.mb’t.sbbt[...]	[...Mi]lkom, he has constructed for you the precinct entrances[...]
Line 2	[...]𐤊𐤊𐤋.𐤌𐤎𐤁𐤁.𐤏𐤋𐤊.𐤌𐤕𐤉𐤌𐤕𐤍[...]	[...] ככל . מסבב . עלך . מת ימתן [...]	[...]kkl.msbb.‘lk.mtymtn[...]	[...]that all who threaten you shall surely die[...]
Line 3	[...]𐤊𐤇𐤃.𐤀𐤊𐤇𐤃𐤌.𐤅𐤊𐤋.𐤌𐤏𐤓𐤁[...]	[...]כחד . אכחדם . וכל . מערב [...]	[...]kḥd.’kḥdm.wkl.m‘rb[...]	[...]I shall surely destroy them, and all who enter[...]
Line 4	[𐤌]𐤅𐤁𐤊𐤋.𐤎𐤃𐤓𐤕.𐤉𐤋𐤍𐤍.𐤑𐤃𐤒	ובכל . סדרת . ילנן . צדק[ם...]	wbkl.sdrt.ylnn.ṣdq[m...]	[...]and amidst all its columns the just shall reside[...]
Line 5	[...]𐤋.𐤕𐤃𐤋𐤕.𐤁𐤈𐤍.𐤊𐤓𐤄[...]	[...] ל . תדלת . בטן כרה[...]	[...]l.tdlt.bṭn.krh[...]	[...] there will hang from its doors an ornament[...]
Line 6	[...]𐤄.𐤕𐤔𐤕𐤏.𐤁𐤁𐤍.𐤀𐤋𐤌[...]	[...]ה תשתע . בבן . אלם[...]	[...]h.tšt‘.bbn.’lm[...]	[...]ill be offered within its portico[...]
Line 7	[...]𐤅𐤔𐤋𐤅𐤄.𐤅𐤍[...]	[...]ושלוה ונ[...]	[...]wšlwh.wn[...]	[...]and safety[...]
Line 8	[...𐤋𐤌]𐤔𐤋𐤌.𐤋𐤄.𐤅𐤔[...]	[... לם]שלם לה וש[...]	[...]šlm.lh.wš[lm...]	[...]peace to you and pe[ace...]

== Bibliography ==
- Aufrecht, Walter E. (1989). A Corpus of Ammonite Inscriptions. Ancient Near Eastern Texts & Studies Vol. 4. Lewiston, NY: Edwin Mellen and others. ISBN 0889460892. OCLC 17440634.
- Cross, Frank Moore (1969). "Epigraphic Notes on the ‘Ammān Citadel Inscription". BASOR 193, pp. 13–19.
- Fulco, William J. (1978). "The ‘Ammān Citadel Inscription: A New Collation". BASOR 230, pp. 39–43.
- Horn, Siegfried (1969). "The Ammān Citadel Inscription". BASOR 193, pp. 2–13.
- Shea, William H. (1981). "The Amman Citadel Inscription Again". Palestine Exploration Quarterly. 113 (2): 105–110. doi:10.1080/00310328.1981.11910756.

== Websites ==
- The Amman Citadel Inscription at kchancon.com
