= Barbash =

Barbash is a surname. Notable people with the surname include:

- Eddie Barbash, American saxophonist and member of the band Stay Human
- Ilisa Barbash, American visual anthropologist
- Samantha Barbash, American entrepreneur and adult entertainment host
- Tom Barbash (born 1950), American writer, educator, and critic
- Uri Barbash (born 1946), Israeli film director

== See also ==
- Barabas (disambiguation)
- Barabash (disambiguation), surname
- Barabash (rural locality), a selo in Russia
