= The Passion of the Christ =

2004 film by Mel Gibson

- Theatrical release poster
- Directed by: Mel Gibson
- Screenplay by: Benedict Fitzgerald; Mel Gibson
- Based on: Canonical Gospels; The Dolorous Passion of Our Lord Jesus Christ by Anne Catherine Emmerich
- Produced by: Bruce Davey; Mel Gibson; Stephen McEveety
- Starring: Jim Caviezel; Monica Bellucci; Maia Morgenstern; Sergio Rubini
- Cinematography: Caleb Deschanel
- Edited by: John Wright; Steve Mirkovich
- Music by: John Debney
- Production company: Icon Productions
- Distributed by: Newmarket Films
- Release date: February 25, 2004 (United States)
- Running time: 127 minutes
- Country: United States
- Languages: Aramaic; Hebrew; Latin
- Budget: $30 million
- Box office: $622.3 million

The Passion of the Christ is a 2004 American epic biblical drama film co-produced and directed by Mel Gibson from a screenplay he wrote with Benedict Fitzgerald. It is the first installment of The Passion of the Christ film series. The film stars Jim Caviezel as Jesus, Maia Morgenstern as his mother Mary, and Monica Bellucci as Mary Magdalene. It depicts the arrest, trial and crucifixion of Jesus, largely according to the canonical gospels as well as additional accounts such as the purported mystical visions by Anne Catherine Emmerich and the Friday of Sorrows.

The film primarily covers the final twelve hours before Jesus Christ's death, known as "the Passion". It begins with the Agony in the Garden of Olives (i.e., Gethsemane), continues with the betrayal of Judas Iscariot, the Flagellation of Christ, the suffering of Mary as prophesied by Simeon, the crucifixion and death of Jesus, and ends with a brief depiction of his resurrection. The narrative is interspersed with moments in Jesus's life, such as the Last Supper and the Sermon on the Mount, and moments of Jesus' early life. The film was mostly shot in Italy. The dialogue is entirely in reconstructed Aramaic, Hebrew, and Latin. Although Gibson was initially against it, the film is subtitled.

The Passion of the Christ was released theatrically by Newmarket Films on February 25, 2004. Critical reception was polarized; some critics called the film a religious and holy experience, praising the performances, Mel Gibson’s direction, production values, and John Debney's score, others criticized its graphic depiction of violence, arguing that the brutality was excessive, while some found it antisemitic, prompting widespread debate and controversy.

The film grossed $622.3 million worldwide against a $30 million budget, and became the fifth highest-grossing film of 2004 internationally at the end of its theatrical run. It is the highest-grossing Christian film of all time (inflation unadjusted), as well as the highest-grossing independent film of all time and the fifth highest-grossing biographical film. It was the highest-grossing R-rated film in the US, at $370.8 million, a record which remained unbroken for 20 years. It received multiple awards and nominations including three nominations at the 77th Academy Awards in 2005, for Best Makeup, Best Cinematography, and Best Original Score.

Two sequels, The Resurrection of the Christ: Part One and Part Two, are due to be released in 2027 and 2028, with a new cast.

== Plot ==
On the night of Passover, Jesus prays in Gethsemane, asking for his father to protect him as his followers Peter, James and John fall asleep. After Jesus rebukes Satan for tempting him to escape his fate, another of his followers, Judas Iscariot, having been bribed by Caiaphas and the Pharisees with thirty pieces of silver, leads temple guards to the garden and betrays Jesus' identity. The guards arrest Jesus and beat him on the way to the Sanhedrin. John informs Jesus' mother, Mary, and Mary Magdalene of the arrest, and they reunite with Peter, who has followed Jesus and his captors.

Caiaphas tries Jesus, where false accusations are made against him, while Pharisees who secretly support Jesus and object to the trial are expelled from the court. Jesus claims he is the divine Son of Man, causing Caiaphas to angrily condemn him to death for blasphemy. As Jesus is brutally beaten, Peter is confronted by the mob and he denies being a follower of Jesus; remembering Jesus precisely predicted this, he weeps bitterly. Guilt-ridden, Judas attempts to return the money to have Jesus freed, but is refused by the priests. Haunted by demons in the form of children, Judas hangs himself outside Jerusalem.

Jesus is brought to be condemned to death by Pontius Pilate, the Roman governor of Judea. At the urging of his wife, Claudia, Pilate questions Jesus and finds no fault in him, transferring him to the court of Herod Antipas since Jesus is from Antipas' domain of Galilee. When Antipas deems Jesus harmless and returns him, Pilate offers the crowd the choice of freeing Jesus or the convicted murderer Barabbas. When the crowd demands Barabbas be freed and Jesus crucified, Pilate attempts to appease the crowd by ordering Jesus flogged, and he is brutally scourged by the Roman guards. Using cloths provided by Claudia, Mother Mary and Mary Magdalene clean up his blood, where Mary Magdalene reminisces on Jesus saving her from a stoning.

The guards hurl insults at Jesus and place a crown of thorns on his head. Pilate presents him to the crowd and Caiaphas, who all again demand that he be crucified. Unwilling to instigate unrest, Pilate orders Jesus' crucifixion, claiming no responsibility. Jesus carries a heavy wooden cross on the road to Golgotha with two thieves, Dismas and Gesmas, following behind. Along the way, he is harassed by the guards and rampant mob, is momentarily comforted by his mother and replenished by a woman who wipes his bloodied face with her veil. An unwilling Simon of Cyrene is pressed with helping Jesus carry the cross to Golgotha, where Jesus is crucified with Mary, Magdalene, John, and others witnessing.

Jesus prays to God to forgive his tormentors who mock him for not being able to come down from the cross, and he also provides salvation to Dismas, crucified beside him, for the latter’s faith and repentance, and comforts his own mother. Finally succumbing to his wounds, Jesus surrenders his spirit and dies. A single droplet of rain falls, triggering an earthquake which damages the Second Temple and rips the veil covering the Holy of Holies, to the horror of Caiaphas and the Pharisees. The guards seek to expedite the thieves' deaths by breaking their legs and, upon seeing Jesus dead, order tribune Cassius to spear his side to be sure. As Satan screams in defeat in a distorted hellscape, Jesus' body is taken down from the cross and entombed; on the third day, he rises from the dead and exits the tomb.

== Cast ==
- Jim Caviezel as Jesus
  - Andrea Refuto as Young Jesus
- Maia Morgenstern as Mary, mother of Jesus
- Christo Jivkov as John
- Francesco De Vito as Peter
- Monica Bellucci as Mary Magdalene
- Mattia Sbragia as Caiaphas
- Toni Bertorelli as Annas
- Luca Lionello as Judas Iscariot
- Hristo Naumov Shopov as Pontius Pilate
- Claudia Gerini as Claudia Procles
- Fabio Sartor as Abenader
- Giacinto Ferro as Joseph of Arimathea
- Olek Mincer as Nicodemus
- Sheila Mokhtari as Woman in audience
- Sergio Rubini as Dismas
- Roberto Bestazoni as Malchus
- Francesco Cabras as Gestas
- Giovanni Capalbo as Cassius
- Rosalinda Celentano as Satan
- Emilio De Marchi as Scornful Roman
- Lello Giulivo as Brutish Roman
- Abel Jafry as 2nd Temple officer
- Jarreth Merz as Simon of Cyrene
- Matt Patresi as Janus
- Roberto Visconti as Scornful Roman
- Luca De Dominicis as Herod Ántipas
- Chokri Ben Zagden as James
- Sabrina Impacciatore as Seraphia
- Pietro Sarubbi as Barabbas
- Ted Rusoff as Chief Elder
- Giuseppe Loconsole and Dario D'Ambrosi as Roman Soldiers who flog Jesus

== Themes ==
In The Passion: Photography from the Movie "The Passion of the Christ", director Mel Gibson says, "This is a movie about love, hope, faith and forgiveness. Jesus died for all mankind, suffered for all of us. It's time to get back to that basic message. The world has gone nuts. We could all use a little more love, faith, hope and forgiveness."

Scholars and critics have interpreted The Passion of the Christ as mainly concerned with suffering, sacrifice, redemption, and the theological significance of the crucifixion. Film critic Roger Ebert described suffering as central to the film, noting that its title invokes the older meaning of "passion" as suffering and pain, while Christian theology connects Christ's suffering with his love for humanity and willingness to die for human sin. The Passion narrative is also presented within the broader themes of death and resurrection. Biblical scholar Adele Reinhartz notes that the Passion occupies a central position in both the canonical Gospels and films about Jesus, arguing that Jesus' death and subsequent resurrection give theological meaning to his life and messianic identity. The film explores Jesus humanity and divinity through his physical suffering, emotional vulnerability and spiritual identity as the Son of God. Film critic Peter Chattaway discussed the film's use of flashbacks and personal memories to portray Jesus as a human figure while retaining the religious significance of his divine mission. Other themes also identified in the film are the conflict between good and evil, mercy, and maternal love and grief.

== Source material ==
=== Biblical canon ===
According to Mel Gibson, the primary source material for The Passion of the Christ is the four canonical Gospel narratives of Christ's passion. The film includes a trial of Jesus at Herod's court, which is only found in the Gospel of Luke. The film also draws from other parts of the New Testament. One line spoken by Jesus in the film, "I make all things new", is found in the Book of Revelation, Chapter 21, verse 5.

The film also refers to the Old Testament. The film begins with an epigraph from the Fourth Song of the Suffering Servant from Isaiah. In the opening scene set in the Garden of Gethsemane, Jesus crushes a serpent's head in direct visual allusion to Genesis 3:15. Throughout the film, Jesus quotes from the Psalms, beyond the instances recorded in the New Testament.

=== Traditional iconography and stories ===
Many of the depictions in the film deliberately mirror traditional representations of the Passion in art. For example, the 14 Stations of the Cross are central to the depiction of the Via Dolorosa in The Passion of the Christ. All the stations are portrayed except for the eighth station (Jesus meets the women of Jerusalem, a deleted scene on the DVD) and the fourteenth station (Jesus is laid in the tomb). Gibson was inspired by the representation of Jesus on the Shroud of Turin.

At the suggestion of actress Maia Morgenstern, the Passover Seder is quoted early in the film. Mary asks "Why is this night different from other nights?", and Mary Magdalene replies with the traditional response: "Because once we were slaves, and we are slaves no longer." The conflation of Mary Magdalene with the adulteress saved from stoning by Jesus has some precedent in Catholic tradition, and according to the director was done for dramatic reasons. The names of some characters in the film are traditional and extra-Scriptural, such as the thieves crucified alongside the Christ, Dismas and Gesmas (also Gestas).

The film also took some inspiration from visions from Catholic visionaries such as Mary of Jesus of Ágreda and Anne Catherine Emmerich. The Dolorous Passion of Our Lord Jesus Christ, a book by Clemens Brentano that details the visions of Anne Catherine Emmerich, was particularly inspiring to Gibson because it provided vivid descriptions of the crucifixion, as well as additional roles played by Mary, Jesus' mother. The depiction of Veronica wiping the face of Jesus is from a Catholic tradition and relates to a relic known as the Veil of Veronica. The film slightly showed the veil bearing the image of the face of Jesus. Its origin lies in the sixth Station of the Cross, in which Saint Veronica wipes Jesus's face with her veil after he encounters her along the Via Dolorosa to Calvary.

== Production ==
=== Script and language ===
Gibson originally announced that he would use two old languages without subtitles as he believed "the image will overcome the language barrier". Because the story of the Passion is so well known, Gibson felt the need to avoid vernacular languages in order to surprise audiences: "I think it's almost counterproductive to say some of these things in a modern language. It makes you want to stand up and shout out the next line, like when you hear 'To be or not to be' and you instinctively say to yourself, 'That is the question.'" The script was written in English by Gibson and Benedict Fitzgerald, then translated by William Fulco, S.J., a professor at Loyola Marymount University, into Latin and reconstructed Aramaic. Fulco sometimes incorporated deliberate errors in pronunciations and word endings when the characters were speaking a language unfamiliar to them, and some of the crude language used by the Roman soldiers was not translated in the subtitles.

In February 2008, it was reported that screenwriter Benedict Fitzgerald was suing Gibson, along with Vicki Christianson, Icon Productions, Icon Distribution, Marquis Films, and Airborne Productions, for defrauding him of millions of dollars, as well as incorrectly taking co-writing credit for the screenplay of the film. In May 2009, Gibson agreed to an undisclosed settlement with Fitzgerald. Details of the settlement, agreed at Los Angeles County Superior Court, were not released. Gibson's representatives did not comment on the settlement.

=== Filming ===
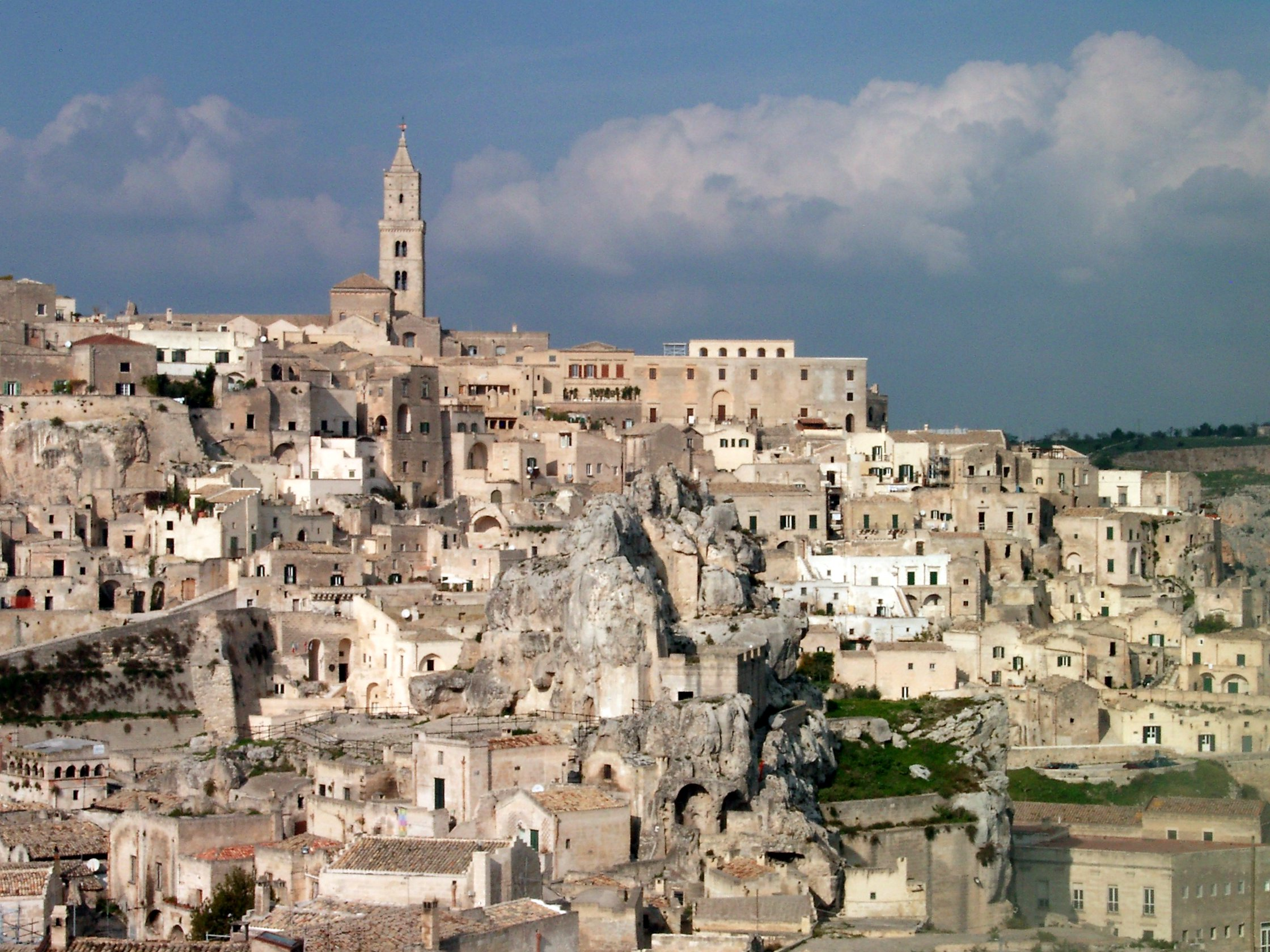
Matera, Italy

The film was produced independently and shot in Italy at Cinecittà Studios in Rome, and on location in the city of Matera and the ghost town of Craco, both in the Basilicata region. The estimated US$30 million production cost, plus an additional estimated $15 million in marketing costs, were fully borne by Gibson and his company Icon Productions. According to the DVD special feature, Martin Scorsese had recently finished his film Gangs of New York, from which Gibson and his production designers constructed part of their set. This saved Gibson much time and money.

Gibson consulted several theological advisers during filming, including Fr. Jonathan Morris, and a local priest, Philip J. Ryan, who visited the set daily to provide counsel, Confession, and Holy Communion to Jim Caviezel. Masses were celebrated for cast and crew in several locations. There were other priests involved with the filming, including Abbé Michel Debourges from the Institute of Christ the King, Stephen Somerville, and Jean-Marie Charles-Roux, all of whom were asked by Mel Gibson to daily celebrate the Traditional Latin Mass. During filming, key set production assistant Jan Michelini was struck by lightning on two occasions several months apart, and was nicknamed "Lightning Boy". On the second occasion, Caviezel also was struck.

=== Music ===
Three albums were released with Gibson's co-operation: (1) the soundtrack of John Debney's original orchestral score conducted by Nick Ingman; (2) The Passion of the Christ: Songs, by producers Mark Joseph and Tim Cook, with original compositions by various artists, and (3) Songs Inspired by The Passion of the Christ. The first two albums each received a 2005 Dove award, and the soundtrack received an Academy Award nomination of Best Original Music Score. The music score frequently makes use of the wailing woman technique. A preliminary score was composed and recorded by Lisa Gerrard and Patrick Cassidy, but was incomplete at film's release. Jack Lenz was the primary musical researcher and one of the composers; several clips of his compositions have been posted online.

=== Title change ===
Although Mel Gibson wanted to call his film The Passion, on October 16, 2003, his spokesman announced that the title used in the United States would be The Passion of Christ because Miramax Films had already registered the title The Passion with the MPAA for the 1987 novel by Jeanette Winterson. Later, the title was changed again to The Passion of the Christ for all markets.

=== Distribution and marketing ===
Gibson began production on his film without securing outside funding or distribution. In 2002, he explained why he could not get backing from the Hollywood studios: "This is a film about something that nobody wants to touch, shot in two dead languages." Gibson and his company Icon Productions provided the film's sole backing, spending about $30 million on production costs and an estimated $15 million on marketing. After early accusations of antisemitism, it became difficult for Gibson to find an American distribution company. 20th Century Fox initially had a first-look deal with Icon but decided to pass on the film in response to public protests; Fox did however release the film on domestic home media as well as in Latin America and Asia-Pacific. In order to avoid the spectacle of other studios turning down the film and to avoid subjecting the distributor to the same intense public criticism he had received, Gibson decided to distribute the film in the United States himself, with the aid of independent distributor Newmarket Films. Gibson handled the distribution and marketing on his own, whilst Newmarket assisted with shipping prints of the film and collecting the revenue from theaters.

Gibson departed from the usual film marketing formula. He employed a small-scale television advertising campaign with no press junkets. Similar to marketing campaigns for earlier biblical films like The King of Kings, The Passion of the Christ was heavily promoted by many church groups, both within their organizations and to the public. Typical licensed merchandise like posters, T-shirts, coffee mugs and jewelry was sold through retailers and websites. The United Methodist Church stated that many of its members, like other Christians, felt that the film was a good way to evangelize non-believers. As a result, many congregations planned to be at the theaters, and some set up tables to answer questions and share prayers. Rev. John Tanner, pastor of Cove United Methodist Church in Hampton Cove, Alabama, said: "They feel the film presents a unique opportunity to share Christianity in a way today's public can identify with." The Seventh-day Adventist Church also expressed a similar endorsement of the picture. More than a dozen Catholic bishops and cardinals issued statements praising the film.

=== Evangelical support ===
The Passion of the Christ received enthusiastic support from the American evangelical community. Before the film's release, Gibson contacted evangelical leaders seeking their support and feedback. With their help, Gibson organized and attended a series of pre-release screenings for evangelical audiences and discussed the making of the film and his personal faith. In June 2003 he screened the film for 800 pastors attending a leadership conference at New Life Church, pastored by Ted Haggard, then president of the National Association of Evangelicals. Gibson gave similar showings at Joel Osteen's Lakewood Church, Greg Laurie's Harvest Christian Fellowship, and to 3,600 pastors at a conference at Rick Warren's Saddleback Church in Lake Forest.

From mid-2003 to the film's release in February 2004, portions or rough cuts of the film were shown to over eighty audiences, including many evangelical audiences. The film received public endorsements from evangelical leaders including Rick Warren, Billy Graham, Robert Schuller, Darrell Bock, Christianity Today editor David Neff, Pat Robertson, Lee Strobel, Jerry Falwell, Max Lucado, Tim LaHaye and Chuck Colson.

== Release ==
=== Box office and theatrical run ===
The Passion of the Christ opened in the United States on February 25, 2004 (Ash Wednesday, the beginning of Lent). It earned $83.8 million from 4,793 screens at 3,043 theaters in its opening weekend and a total of $125.2 million since its Wednesday opening, ranking it fourth overall in domestic opening weekend earnings for 2004 as well as the biggest weekend debut for a February release (until Fifty Shades of Grey was released). The film tied with The Lord of the Rings: The Return of the King's record for having the highest five-day Wednesday opening. Moreover, The Passion of the Christ scored the second biggest opening weekend for any R-rated movie, behind The Matrix Reloaded. It went on to earn $370.8 million overall in the United States, and remained the highest grossing R-rated film in the domestic market (U.S. & Canada) for 20 years, before the record went to Deadpool & Wolverine in 2024 with a domestic gross of $636.7 million. The film sold an estimated 59.6 million tickets in the US in its initial theatrical run.

In the Philippines, a majority-Catholic country, the film was released on March 31, 2004, rated PG-13 by the Movie and Television Review and Classification Board (MTRCB) and endorsed by the Catholic Bishops Conference of the Philippines (CBCP). In Malaysia, government censors initially banned it completely, but after Christian leaders protested, the restriction was lifted, but only for Christian audiences, allowing them to view the film in specially designated theaters. In Israel, the film was not banned. However, it never received theatrical distribution because no Israeli distributor would market it.

Despite the many controversies and refusals by some governments to allow the film to be viewed in wide release, The Passion of the Christ earned $612 million worldwide. The film was also a relative success in certain countries with large Muslim populations, such as in Egypt, where it ranked 20th overall in its box office numbers for 2004. In addition, it witnessed immense popularity in countries like Jordan, Lebanon, Qatar, Syria, and the United Arab Emirates where political parallels with the Israeli–Palestinian conflict resonated with audiences. However, it was banned in Bahrain, Kuwait and Saudi Arabia for religious reasons, particularly for depicting Jesus contrary to Islamic teachings. The film was the highest grossing non-English-language film of all time until 2017, when it was surpassed by Wolf Warrior 2.

The film returned to theaters from September 10-17, 2026 ahead of the anticipated 2027 release of the sequel. The re-release has been remastered in 4K quality with Dolby Atmos sound. The release was handled by Fathom Events and Lionsgate.

=== The Passion Recut ===
The theatrical poster for The Passion Recut, which depicts Jesus without facial lacerations.

The Passion Recut, a re-edited version, was released in theaters on March 11, 2005, with five minutes of the most explicit violence deleted, in hopes of attracting more viewers by making the film approachable to consumers who found the original cut too gruesome. President of Newmarket Films Bob Berney stated, "I knew a lot of people that wanted to see it but couldn't go...They were just too nervous or squeamish." Gibson explained his reasoning for this re-edited version:

After the initial run in movie theaters, I received numerous letters from people all across the country. Many told me they wanted to share the experience with loved ones but were concerned that the harsher images of the film would be too intense for them to bear. In light of this I decided to re-edit The Passion of the Christ.

Gibson anticipated that the film would be rated PG-13 after he edited it to bring it closer to that rating. The Motion Picture Association of America (MPAA) still deemed The Passion Recut too violent for the PG-13 rating, but because Newmarket is not an MPAA signatory and hence does not have to comply with MPAA guidelines, they decided to release the film as unrated. On the Passion Recut's rating and appeal to wider audiences, Berney explained:

The goal was to try and reach toward a PG-13 level, but the MPAA felt it still was an R due to the overall intensity of the film, so we are going out unrated and perhaps it's ultimately somewhere in between. The end result is a shift in tone and balance that makes the film more accessible to a wider audience, particularly those that had concerns about some of the extreme moments in the original version.

The film's re-release was an "experiment" for Newmarket and Icon, since the companies hoped for a four-week showing that would extended through Easter Sunday (March 27). Had the experiment succeeded, Newmarket and Icon would have released the film every year around Easter. However, the shortened film showed for three weeks in 960 theaters for a box office total of $567,692, minuscule compared to the $612,054,428 of The Passion. The BBFC classified the recut with a 15 rating, lower than the original cut's 18 rating.

==== Differences ====
During the scourging scene, the cat o' nine tails striking Jesus's flesh that resulted in blood squirting and his flesh being dislodged was omitted. In the crucifixion scene, the Roman soldiers nailing Jesus with blood spurting is cut, and the soldier strenuously dislocating Jesus's shoulder is trimmed; instead, the reaction shots of Mary and Jesus are shown. Incidentally, the scene in which the cross is flipped over and suspended in air was also deleted, due to viewers not understanding what they saw.

On this edit's overall effect, Gibson further added, "I have toned down some of the more brutal scenes without removing them or compromising the impact of the film. By softening some of its more wrenching aspects, I hope to make the film and its message of love available to a wider audience".

=== Home media ===
On August 31, 2004, the film was released on VHS and DVD in North America by 20th Century Fox Home Entertainment, which initially passed on theatrical distribution. As with the original theatrical release, the film's release on home video formats proved to be very popular. Early estimates indicated that over 2.4 million copies of the film were sold by 3:00 p.m., with a total of 4.1 million copies on its first day of sale. The film was available on DVD with English and Spanish subtitles and on VHS tape with English subtitles. The film was released on Blu-ray in North America as a two-disc Definitive Edition set on February 17, 2009. It was also released on Blu-ray in Australia a week before Easter.

Although the original DVD release sold well, it contained no bonus features other than a trailer, which provoked speculation about how many buyers would wait for a special edition to be released. On January 30, 2007, a two-disc Definitive Edition was released in the North American markets, and March 26 of that year elsewhere. It contains several documentaries, soundtrack commentaries, deleted scenes, outtakes, the 2005 unrated version, and the original 2004 theatrical version.

The British version of the two-disc DVD contains two additional deleted scenes. In the first, Jesus meets the women of Jerusalem (at the eighth station of the cross) and falls to the ground as the women wail around him, and Simon of Cyrene attempts to hold up the cross and help up Jesus simultaneously. Afterwards, while both are holding up the cross, Jesus says to the women weeping for him, "Do not weep for me, but for yourselves and for your children". In the second, Pilate washes his hands, turns to Caiaphas, and says: "Look you to it" (i.e., the Pharisees wish to have Jesus crucified). Pilate then turns to Abanader and says: "Do as they wish". The scene next shows Pilate calling to his servant, who is carrying a wooden board on which Pilate writes, "Jesus of Nazareth, the King of the Jews", in Latin and Hebrew. He then holds the board above his head in full view of Caiaphas, who after reading it challenges Pilate on its content. Pilate replies angrily to Caiaphas in non-subtitled Hebrew. The disc contains only two deleted scenes in total. No other scenes from the movie are shown on disc 2.

On February 7, 2017, 20th Century Fox re-released the film on Blu-ray and DVD featuring the theatrical version and the edited version (The Passion Recut), where the graphic violence is reduced. The theatrical version features English and Spanish dubs.

=== Television broadcast ===
On April 17, 2011 (Palm Sunday), Trinity Broadcasting Network (TBN) presented the film at 7:30 p.m. ET/PT, in the United States with multiple showings scheduled. The network had continued to air the film throughout the year, and particularly around Easter.

On March 29, 2013 (Good Friday), as a part of their special Holy Week programming, TV5 in the Philippines presented the Filipino-dubbed version of the film at 2:00 p.m. (PST, UTC+8). Its total broadcast ran for two hours, but excluding the advertisements, it would only run for approximately one hour instead of its full run time of two hours and six minutes. It ended at 4:00 p.m. It has been rated SPG by the Movie and Television Review and Classification Board (MTRCB) for themes, language and violence with some scenes censored for television. TV5 is the first broadcast network outside of the United States and dubbed the Vernacular Hebrew and Latin language to Filipino (through translating its supplied English subtitles).

== Reception ==
Review aggregator Rotten Tomatoes reports an approval rating of 50% based on 278 critical reviews. The website's critical consensus reads: "Director Mel Gibson's zeal is unmistakable, but The Passion of the Christ will leave many viewers emotionally drained rather than spiritually uplifted." On Metacritic, the film has a weighted average of 47 out of 100, based on 44 critics, indicating "mixed or average reviews". Audiences polled by CinemaScore gave the film a rare "A+" grade.

In a positive review for Time, its critic Richard Corliss called The Passion of the Christ "a serious, handsome, excruciating film that radiates total commitment". New York Press film critic Armond White praised Gibson's direction, comparing him to Carl Theodor Dreyer in how he transformed art into spirituality. White also noted that it was odd to see Gibson offer audiences "an intellectual challenge" with the film. Roger Ebert from the Chicago Sun-Times gave the movie four out of four stars, calling it "the most violent film I have ever seen" as well as reflecting on how it struck him, a former altar boy: "What Gibson has provided for me, for the first time in my life, is a visceral idea of what the Passion consisted of. That his film is superficial in terms of the surrounding message—that we get only a few passing references to the teachings of Jesus—is, I suppose, not the point. This is not a sermon or a homily, but a visualization of the central event in the Christian religion. Take it or leave it."

In a negative review for Slate, David Edelstein called The Passion of the Christ "a two-hour-and-six-minute snuff movie". Jami Bernard of the New York Daily News felt it was "the most virulently anti-Semitic movie made since the German propaganda films of World War II". In the Dallas Observer, Robert Wilonsky wrote that he found the film "too turgid to awe the nonbelievers, too zealous to inspire and often too silly to take seriously, with its demonic hallucinations that look like escapees from a David Lynch film; I swear I couldn't find the devil carrying around a hairy-backed midget anywhere in the text I read".

The June 2006 issue of Entertainment Weekly named The Passion of the Christ the most controversial film of all time, followed by Stanley Kubrick's A Clockwork Orange (1971). In 2010, Time listed it as one of the most "ridiculously violent" films of all time.

=== Disputed papal endorsement ===
On December 5, 2003, Passion of the Christ co-producer Stephen McEveety gave a rough cut of the film to Archbishop Stanisław Dziwisz, the pope's secretary. Pope John Paul II watched the film in his private apartment with Archbishop Dziwisz that night, and later met with McEveety and Jan Michelini, an Italian and the movie's assistant director. On December 17, Wall Street Journal columnist Peggy Noonan reported John Paul II had said "It is as it was", citing McEveety, who said he heard it from Dziwisz. Noonan had emailed Joaquín Navarro-Valls, the head of the Vatican's press office, for confirmation before writing her column, surprised that the "famously close-mouthed" Navarro-Valls had approved the use of the "It is as it was" quote, and his emailed response stated he had no other comment at that time. National Catholic Reporter journalist John L. Allen Jr. published a similar account on the same day, quoting an unnamed senior Vatican official. Reuters and the Associated Press independently confirmed the story, citing Vatican sources.

A dispute emerged a few days later, when an anonymous Vatican official told Catholic News Service "There was no declaration, no judgment from the pope." But Allen defended his earlier reporting, saying that his official source was adamant about the veracity of the original story. Columnist Frank Rich for The New York Times wrote that the statement was "being exploited by the Gibson camp", and that when he asked Michelini about the meeting, Michelini said Dziwisz had reported the pope's words as "It is as it was", and said the pope also called the film "incredibile", an Italian word Michelini translated as "amazing". The following day, Archbishop Dziwisz told CNS, "The Holy Father told no one his opinion of this film." This denial resulted in a round of commentators who accused the film producers of fabricating a papal quote to market their movie.

According to Rod Dreher in the Dallas Morning News, McEveety was sent an email from papal spokesman Navarro-Valls that supported the Noonan account, and suggested "It is as it was" could be used as the leitmotif in discussions on the film and said to "Repeat the words again and again and again." Dreher emailed Navarro-Valls a copy of the email McEveety had received, and Navarro-Valls emailed Dreher back and said, "I can categorically deny its authenticity." Dreher opined that either Mel Gibson's camp had created "a lollapalooza of a lie", or the Vatican was making reputable journalists and filmmakers look like "sleazebags or dupes" and he explained:

Interestingly, Ms. Noonan reported in her Dec. 17 column that when she asked the spokesman if the pope had said anything more than "It is as it was," he e-mailed her to say he didn't know of any further comments. She sent me a copy of that e-mail, which came from the same Vatican email address as the one to me and to Mr. McEveety.

Noonan noted that she and Dreher had discovered the emails were sent by "an email server in the Vatican's domain" from a Vatican computer with the same IP address. The Los Angeles Times reported that, when it asked after the story first broke if the "It is as it was" quote was reliable, Navarro-Valls had responded "I think you can consider that quote as accurate." Allen noted that while Dziwisz stated that Pope John Paul II made no declaration about this movie, other Vatican officials were "continuing to insist" the pope did say it, and other sources claimed they had heard Dziwisz say the pope said it on other occasions, and Allen called the situation "kind of a mess". A representative from Gibson's Icon Productions expressed surprise at Dziwisz's statements after the correspondence and conversations between film representatives and the pope's official spokesperson, Navarro-Valls, and stated "there is no reason to believe that the pope's support of the film 'isn't as it was.'"

After speaking to Dziwisz, Navarro-Valls confirmed John Paul II had seen The Passion of the Christ, and released the following official statement:

The film is a cinematographic transposition of the historical event of the Passion of Jesus Christ according to the accounts of the Gospel. It is a common practice of the Holy Father not to express public opinions on artistic works, opinions that are always open to different evaluations of aesthetic character.

In a follow-up column in The Wall Street Journal, Noonan addressed the question of why the issues being raised were not just "a tempest in a teapot" and she explained:

The truth matters. What a pope says matters. And what this pontiff says about this film matters. The Passion, which is to open on Feb. 25, has been the focus of an intense critical onslaught since last summer. The film has been fiercely denounced as anti-Semitic, and accused of perpetuating stereotypes that will fan hatred against Jews. John Paul II has a long personal and professional history of opposing anti-Semitism, of working against it, and of calling for dialogue, respect and reconciliation between all religions. His comments here would have great importance.

=== Allegations of antisemitism ===
Before the film was released, there were prominent criticisms of perceived antisemitic content in the film. It was for that reason that 20th Century Fox decided to pass on the film, informing New York Assemblyman Dov Hikind that a protest outside the News Corporation Building made them decide against distributing the film. Hikind warned other companies that "they should not distribute this film. This is unhealthy for Jews all over the world."

A joint committee of the Secretariat for Ecumenical and Inter-religious Affairs of the United States Conference of Catholic Bishops and the Department of Inter-religious Affairs of the Anti-Defamation League obtained a version of the script before it was released in theaters. They released a statement, calling it

one of the most troublesome texts, relative to anti-Semitic potential, that any of us had seen in 25 years. It must be emphasized that the main storyline presented Jesus as having been relentlessly pursued by an evil cabal of Jews, headed by the high priest Caiaphas, who finally blackmailed a weak-kneed Pilate into putting Jesus to death. This is precisely the storyline that fueled centuries of anti-Semitism within Christian societies. This is also a storyline rejected by the Roman Catholic Church at Vatican II in its document Nostra aetate, and by nearly all mainline Protestant churches in parallel documents. ... Unless this basic storyline has been altered by Mr. Gibson, a fringe Catholic who is building his own church in the Los Angeles area and who apparently accepts neither the teachings of Vatican II nor modern biblical scholarship, The Passion of the Christ retains a real potential for undermining the repudiation of classical Christian anti-Semitism by the churches in the last 40 years.

The ADL itself also released a statement about the yet-to-be-released film:

For filmmakers to do justice to the biblical accounts of the passion, they must complement their artistic vision with sound scholarship, which includes knowledge of how the passion accounts have been used historically to disparage and attack Jews and Judaism. Absent such scholarly and theological understanding, productions such as The Passion could likely falsify history and fuel the animus of those who hate Jews.

Rabbi Daniel Lapin, the head of the Toward Tradition organization, criticized this statement, and said of Abraham Foxman, the head of the ADL, "what he is saying is that the only way to escape the wrath of Foxman is to repudiate your faith".

In The Nation, reviewer Katha Pollitt wrote: "Gibson has violated just about every precept of the United States Conference of Catholic Bishops own 1988 'Criteria' for the portrayal of Jews in dramatizations of the Passion (no bloodthirsty Jews, no rabble, no use of Scripture that reinforces negative stereotypes of Jews.) [...] The priests have big noses and gnarly faces, lumpish bodies, yellow teeth; Herod Antipas and his court are a bizarre collection of oily-haired, epicene perverts. The 'good Jews' look like Italian movie stars (Magdalene actually is an Italian movie star, Monica Bellucci); Jesus's mother, who would have been around 50 and appeared 70, could pass for a ripe 35." Jesuit priest Fr. William Fulco, S.J. of Loyola Marymount University—and the film's translator for Hebrew dialogue—specifically disagreed with that assessment, and disagreed with concerns that the film accused the Jewish community of deicide.

In The Guardian, Jewish biblical scholar and expert on the historical Jesus, Géza Vermes wrote a highly critical review of the movie: he stated that the movie is "horribly gory, historically wrong - and it will inspire judeophobia". According to Vermes, "the real problem is not with his attitudes or avowed intentions, but with the lack of appropriate steps taken to prevent visual images from inspiring judeophobia. Caiaphas and his priestly colleagues often struggle not to smile when they see the defeat of Christ. In the film they allow their policemen to beat him up in open court without protest. In the Gospels itself they are depicted as doing things according to the book and reject the witnesses who testify against Jesus. This does not seem to be so in the film. These are dangerous opportunities for inspiring vengeful sentiments".

One specific scene in the film perceived as an example of antisemitism was in the dialogue of Caiaphas, when he states "His blood [is] on us and on our children!" (Mt 27:25), a quote historically interpreted by some as a curse taken upon by the Jewish people. Certain Jewish groups asked this be removed from the film. However, only the subtitles were removed; the original dialogue remains in the Hebrew soundtrack. When asked about this scene, Gibson said: "I wanted it in. My brother said I was wimping out if I didn't include it. But, man, if I included that in there, they'd be coming after me at my house. They'd come to kill me." In an interview with the Detroit Free Press, when asked about the scene, he said, "It's one little passage, and I believe it, but I don't and never have believed it refers to Jews, and implicates them in any sort of curse. It's directed at all of us, all men who were there, and all that came after. His blood is on us, and that's what Jesus wanted. But I finally had to admit that one of the reasons I felt strongly about keeping it, aside from the fact it's true, is that I didn't want to let someone else dictate what could or couldn't be said."

The allegations of antisemitism were satirized in the South Park episode "The Passion of the Jew", which focuses on the reactions of the protagonists to the film. In the episode, Eric Cartman leads a neo-Nazi rally whilst dressed as Adolf Hitler, Kyle Broflovski has nightmares about the excessive violence and complains about the Jews' apparent responsibility for the death of Jesus, and Stan Marsh and Kenny McCormick go to Mel Gibson to get a refund.

Allegations of the film's antisemitism were intensified after Mel Gibson's 2006 arrest for driving under the influence in Malibu, California, where during the arrest, he made antisemitic remarks against the arresting officer. He was recorded saying to the officer, "Fucking Jews. ... the Jews are responsible for all the wars in the world. Are you a Jew?"

=== Reactions to allegations of antisemitism ===
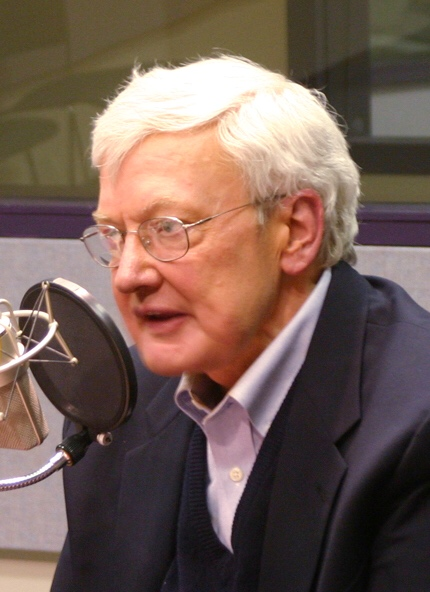
Roger Ebert gave The Passion of the Christ a positive review and defended it against allegations of anti-semitism.

Film critic Roger Ebert, who awarded The Passion of the Christ four out of four stars in his review for the Chicago Sun-Times, denied allegations that the film was anti-semitic. Ebert described the film as "a powerful and important film, helmed by a man with a sincere heart and a warrior's sense of justice. It is a story filled with searing images and ultimately a message of redemption and hope." Ebert said, "It also might just be the greatest cinematic version of the greatest story ever told."

Conservative columnist Cal Thomas also disagreed with allegations of antisemitism and wrote in Townhall: "To those in the Jewish community who worry that the film might contain anti-Semitic elements, or encourage people to persecute Jews, fear not. The film does not indict Jews for the death of Jesus."

Bob Smithouser of Focus on the Family's Plugged In also believed that the film was trying to convey the evils and sins of humanity rather than specifically targeting Jews, stating: "The anthropomorphic portrayal of Satan as a player in these events brilliantly pulls the proceedings into the supernatural realm—a fact that should have quelled the much-publicized cries of anti-Semitism since it shows a diabolical force at work beyond any political and religious agendas of the Jews and Romans."

Moreover, senior officer at the Vatican Cardinal Darío Castrillón Hoyos, who had seen the film, addressed the matter so:

Anti-Semitism, like all forms of racism, distorts the truth in order to put a whole race of people in a bad light. This film does nothing of the sort. It draws out from the historical objectivity of the Gospel narratives sentiments of forgiveness, mercy, and reconciliation. It captures the subtleties and the horror of sin, as well as the gentle power of love and forgiveness, without making or insinuating blanket condemnations against one group. This film expressed the exact opposite, that learning from the example of Christ, there should never be any more violence against any other human being.

Asked by Bill O'Reilly if his movie would "upset Jews", Gibson responded, "It's not meant to. I think it's meant to just tell the truth. I want to be as truthful as possible." In an interview for The Globe and Mail, he added: "If anyone has distorted Gospel passages to rationalize cruelty towards Jews or anyone, it's in defiance of repeated Papal condemnation. The Papacy has condemned racism in any form... Jesus died for the sins of all times, and I'll be the first on the line for culpability."

=== Criticism of excessive violence ===
A.O. Scott in The New York Times wrote "The Passion of the Christ is so relentlessly focused on the savagery of Jesus' final hours that this film seems to arise less from love than from wrath, and to succeed more in assaulting the spirit than in uplifting it." David Edelstein, Slate's film critic, dubbed the film "a two-hour-and-six-minute snuff movie—The Jesus Chainsaw Massacre—that thinks it's an act of faith", and further criticized Gibson for focusing on the brutality of Jesus' execution, instead of his religious teachings.

In 2008, writer Michael Gurnow in American Atheists stated much the same, labeling the work a mainstream snuff film. Critic Armond White, in his review of the film for Africana.com, offered another perspective on the violence in the film. He wrote, "Surely Gibson knows (better than anyone in Hollywood is willing to admit) that violence sells. It's problematic that this time, Gibson has made a film that asks for a sensitive, serious, personal response to violence rather than his usual glorifying of vengeance."

During Diane Sawyer's interview of him, Gibson said:

I wanted it to be shocking; and I wanted it to be extreme...So that they see the enormity of that sacrifice; to see that someone could endure that and still come back with love and forgiveness, even through extreme pain and suffering and ridicule. The actual crucifixion was more violent than what was shown on the film, but I thought no one would get anything out of it.

=== Accolades ===
Award	Category	Recipient(s)	Result	Ref(s)
National Board of Review	Freedom of Expression Award	The Passion of the Christ	Won	(tie)
People’s Choice Awards	Favorite Motion Picture — Drama	The Passion of the Christ	Won	
American Society of Cinematographers	Outstanding Achievement in Cinematography in Theatrical Releases	Caleb Deschanel	Nominated	
Satellite Awards	Best Director	Mel Gibson	Won	
International Horror Guild Award	Best Movie	The Passion of the Christ	Nominated	
Ethnic Multicultural Media Academy	Best Film Actress	Maia Morgenstern (as Mary, Mother of Jesus)	Won	
MTV Movie Awards	Best Male Performance	Jim Caviezel	Nominated	
Hollywood Film Awards	Cinematographer of the Year	Caleb Deschanel	Won	
Hollywood Film Awards	Producer of the Year	Mel Gibson	Won	
Golden Reel Awards	Best Sound Editing in a Feature Film — Music	Michael T. Ryan	Won	
Hollywood Film Festival	Hollywood Producer of the Year	Mel Gibson	Won	
GMA Dove Awards	Instrumental Album of the Year (Original Motion Picture Soundtrack)	John Debney / soundtrack team	Won	
Irish Film and Television Awards	Jameson People's Choice Award for Best International Film	The Passion of the Christ	Nominated	
Golden Eagle Awards	Best Foreign Language Film	The Passion of the Christ	Won	
Ischia Film Festival	Best Feature Film	Mel Gibson	Won	
Golden Trailer Awards	Best Music	The Passion of the Christ	Nominated	
Capri Hollywood International Film Festival	Best Picture	The Passion of the Christ	Won	
Capri Hollywood International Film Festival	Best Actress	Claudia Gerini	Won	
Broadcast Film Critics Association Awards	Best Popular Movie	The Passion of the Christ	Nominated	
Movieguide Awards	John Templeton Foundation Epiphany Prize (Most Inspirational Movie)	The Passion of the Christ	Won	
Movieguide Awards	Grace Prize for Acting in a Movie	Jim Caviezel (as Jesus Christ)	Won	
International Film Music Critics Association Awards	Best Original Score for a Drama Film	John Debney	Nominated	
ASCAP Film and Television Music Awards	Top Box Office Films (Henry Mancini Award recognition)	John Debney (composer)	Won	
Academy Awards	Best Cinematography	Caleb Deschanel	Nominated	
Academy Awards	Best Makeup	Keith Vanderlaan & Christien Tinsley	Nominated	
Academy Awards	Best Original Score	John Debney	Nominated	
Cinema Writers Circle Awards	Best Foreign Film (Mejor Película Extranjera)	The Passion of the Christ	Won	
Nastro d'Argento	Best Supporting Actress	Monica Bellucci	Nominated	

== Sequels ==
In June 2016, writer Randall Wallace stated that he and Gibson had begun work on a sequel to The Passion of the Christ which will focus on the Resurrection and the events surrounding it. In 2018, Caviezel said that Gibson had sent him the third draft of the screenplay. In 2020, Caviezel said that it would be titled The Passion of the Christ: Resurrection and predicted, "It's going to be the biggest film in world history." In July 2023, Gibson stated that the sequel was "coming soon", and that he was working on two versions of the script, saying, "one of them is a very structured and very strong script, and kind of more what one should expect, and the other is like an acid trip." In September 2024, Gibson had reportedly begun scouting various locations with a production team in Europe.

In January 2025, during an appearance on The Joe Rogan Experience, Gibson announced the film's title as The Resurrection of the Christ. When Rogan asked if he would be recasting the lead character, Gibson confirmed that Caviezel would reprise the role, and added that the use of CGI and various special effects would be used to allow the actor to appear the same age. The title would be confirmed in May, with Lionsgate co-producing and distributing the film. Caviezel will ultimately be recast with Jaakko Ohtonen due to budget concerns over digital de-ageing, with the film having an all-new cast. In August 2025, Lionsgate officially announced that two sequels were in development, with Part One scheduled to release on Good Friday 2027 (March 26), and Part Two on Ascension Day 2027 (May 6). However, Lionsgate later changed the release schedule. Part One is now set to premiere on May 6, 2027, while Part Two has been moved to May 25, 2028. Both dates coincide with Ascension Day observances.

== See also ==
- Depiction of Jesus
