= The Dwarf (Lagerkvist novel) =

1944 novel by Pär Lagerkvist

First English-language edition (publ. L.B. Fischer)

The Dwarf (Swedish: Dvärgen) is a 1944 novel by Pär Lagerkvist. It is considered his most important and artistically innovative novel. It was translated into English by Alexandra Dick in 1945.

The main setting is a fictionalized version of Milan. The character Bernardo of the novel is a fictionalized version of Leonardo da Vinci, who served as a court artist and military architect in Milan from 1482 to 1499. The novel depicts the Italian Renaissance through the eyes of a misanthropic assassin.

== Plot ==
The main character is a dwarf, 66 centimetres (26 in) tall, at the court of an Italian City-state in the Renaissance. The exact time and location are unclear, but the presence of the character named Bernardo, who is unmistakably modeled on Leonardo da Vinci, suggests that the story takes place in a fictional version of Milan around the time of Leonardo's stay at the court of the Duke of Milan, Ludovico Sforza, from 1482 to 1499. There is a reference to Santa Croce being in the immediate surroundings, but this is possibly mixed up with the Basilica di Santa Croce di Firenze, so the story could actually be set in Florence. At the same time, Lagerkvist includes Bernardo/Leonardo's creation of The Last Supper and Mona Lisa in the plot, which were done in Milan and Florence, respectively. Further, the prince that inspired Niccolò Machiavelli to write The Prince has been assumed to be Cesare Borgia, who also employed Leonardo da Vinci as a military architect, a role he (as Bernardo) plays alongside his painting work in The Dwarf. In this way aspects of all these historical places and people are mixed into the background of the novel.

The dwarf is the narrator, obviously obsessed with writing down his experiences in a form of diary. Everything in the novel is described from his viewpoint, mostly in retrospect, ranging from a few hours or minutes to several weeks or months after the actual events.

The dwarf is a profound misanthrope and generally embodies all things evil. He hates almost every person at the court except for the prince (who is the ruler of the city-state, rather king than prince), or rather aspects of him. He loves war, brutality and fixed positions. While almost all other characters of the novel develop during the chain of events, the dwarf does not change. He is still exactly the same character from the first to the last page. He is deeply religious, but his take on Christianity includes the belief in a non-forgiving God. He is impressed with Bernardo's science but soon repelled by its relentless search for truth.

When the dwarf is ordered to assassinate a number of enemies of the prince using poisoned wine, he takes this opportunity to assassinate one of the prince's rivals, simply because the dwarf dislikes the rival and the rival is having an affair with the prince's wife.

The novel ends with the dwarf being strapped in chains at the bottom of the royal castle, never to be released again. He is seemingly convicted for flogging the prince's wife to death in anger over her sins. However he takes this sentence lightly, since, as he says, "soon the prince will need his dwarf again".

== Interpretations ==
The Dwarf has been interpreted in several ways, but is generally believed to be Lagerkvist's attempt at creating a genuinely evil character illustrating the evil sides of man. The image of a dwarf may have been chosen to compare a person without empathy (such as the psychopathic and misanthropic Dwarf of the novel) to an "emotional dwarf".

At some points in the novel, especially towards the end, it appears that the dwarf could be the embodiment of the dark sides of the prince himself, and not a real, separate person.

In a broader sense, The Dwarf is a parable outlining major evils of humanity, as told by the dwarf, an outsider and completely evil himself. Each character demonstrates various vices and foibles: The prince, devious, murderous, and hypocritical, The princess is self-centered, adulterous, naive, and foolishly religious. Bernardo (a Da Vinci type), a sycophant who shows the dark side of science, diverting his art and skill for killing. The prince's daughter and her lover are also naive and foolish. Don Ricardo is insouciant, treacherous, a deceiver, glutton, and lover of the princess. The mercenary soldier-captain Boccarossa is also an example of a common human weaknesses, doing evil for money. This is chronicled by the Dwarf, who is amoral and joyless (He is disgusted by Don Ricardo's joie de vivre and has a "Hitlerian" set of values regarding food and sex). All of this is set so we can see clearly our own propensity to vice and foibles.
