= Pär Lagerkvist =

Swedish writer (1891-1974)

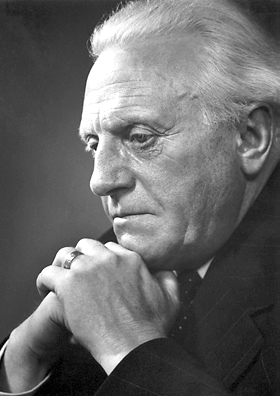
- Lagerkvist in 1951
- Born: 23 May 1891; Växjö, Sweden
- Died: 11 July 1974 (aged 83); Stockholm, Sweden
- Occupations: poet, playwright, novelist, essayist, short story writer
- Writing career
- Notable awards: Nobel Prize in Literature; 1951

Pär Fabian Lagerkvist (23 May 1891 – 11 July 1974) was a Swedish author who received the 1951 Nobel Prize in Literature.

Lagerkvist wrote poetry, plays, novels, short stories, and essays of considerable expressive power and influence from his early 20s to his late 70s. One of his central themes was the fundamental question of good and evil, which he examined through such figures as Barabbas, the man who was freed instead of Jesus, and Ahasuerus, the Wandering Jew. As a moralist, he used religious motifs and figures from the Christian tradition without following the doctrines of a church.

== Biography and works ==
Lagerkvist was born in Växjö (Småland). He received a traditional religious education – he would later say, with little exaggeration, that he "had had the good fortune to grow up in a home where the only books known were the Bible and the Book of Hymns". In his teens he broke away from Christian beliefs, but, unlike many other writers and thinkers in his generation, he did not become vehemently critical of religious beliefs as such. Though he was politically a socialist for most of his life, he never indulged in the idea that "religion is the opium of the people". Much of his writing is informed by a lifelong interest in man and his symbols and gods, and in the position of Man (both as individual and mankind) in a world where the Divine is no longer present, no longer speaking.

In his early years Lagerkvist supported modernist and aesthetically radical views, as shown by his manifesto Ordkonst och bildkonst (Word Art and Picture Art, 1913) and the play Den Svåra Stunden ("The Difficult Hour").

One of the author's earliest works is Ångest (Anguish, 1916), a violent and disillusioned collection of poems. His anguish was derived from his fear of death, the World War, and personal crisis. He tried to explore how a person can find a meaningful life in a world where a war can kill millions for very little reason. "Anguish, anguish is my heritage / the wound of my throat / the cry of my heart in the world." ("Anguish", 1916.) "Love is nothing. Anguish is everything / the anguish of living." ("Love is nothing", 1916.) This pessimism, however, slowly faded, as testified by his subsequent works, Det eviga leendet (The Eternal Smile, 1920), the autobiographical novel Gäst hos verkligheten (Guest of Reality, 1925) and the prose monologue Det besegrade livet (The defeated Life, 1927), in which the faith in man is predominant. From The Eternal Smile on, his style largely abandoned the expressionist pathos and brusque effects of his early works and there was a strong striving for simplicity, classical precision and clean telling, sometimes appearing close to naivism. The content, however, was never truly naive. A Swedish critic remarked that "Lagerkvist and John the Evangelist are two masters at expressing profound things with a highly restricted choice of words".

Ten years after Ångest, Lagerkvist married for the second time, a union which was to provide a pillar of safety in his life until the death of his wife forty years later. Hjärtats sånger (Songs of the Heart) (1926) appeared at this time, bearing witness to his pride and love for his consort. This collection is much less desperate in its tone than Ångest, and established him as one of the foremost Swedish poets of his generation.

His prose novella Bödeln ("The Hangman", 1933), later adapted for the stage (The Hangman, 1933; play, 1934), shows his growing concern with the totalitarianism and brutality that began to sweep across Europe in the years prior to World War II. Nazism was one of the main targets of the work and Der Stürmer responded with a very dismissive review. Criticism against Fascism is also present in the play Mannen utan själ (The Man Without a Soul, 1936). During the Second World War, he was a member of the anti-Nazi organization Tisdagsklubbe and was on the Gestapo's death lists in the face of a possible German invasion of Sweden.

In September 1940 Lagerkvist was elected a member of the Swedish Academy, succeeding Verner von Heidenstam on chair 8 in December the same year.

Lagerkvist's 1944 novel Dvärgen (The Dwarf), a searching, ironic tale about evil, was the first to bring him positive international attention outside of the Nordic countries. The work was followed in 1949 by the unusual, lyrical play Låt människan leva (Let Man Live).

Barabbas (1950), which was immediately hailed as a literary masterpiece (by fellow Nobel laureate André Gide, among others) is probably Lagerkvist's most famous work. The novel is based on a Biblical story. Jesus of Nazareth was sentenced to die by the Roman authorities immediately before the Jewish Passover, when it was customary for the Romans to release someone convicted of a capital offense. When the Roman procurator Pontius Pilate offers to free either Jesus or Barabbas (a convicted thief and murderer), a Jerusalem mob demands the release of Barabbas, who later watches Jesus as he bears the cross to Golgotha, witnesses the crucifixion, and then spends the rest of his life trying to understand why he was chosen to live rather than Jesus. A movie based upon the novel was filmed in 1961, with Anthony Quinn playing the title role.

In 1951 Pär Lagerkvist was awarded the Nobel Prize in Literature "for the artistic vigour and true independence of mind with which he endeavours in his poetry to find answers to the eternal questions confronting mankind.". He had first been proposed for the prize in 1947. Following the publication of Barabbas, Lagerkvist had been one of the favourites to be awarded the Nobel Prize in Literature in 1950. In 1951 the Nobel committee for literature received nine nominations for Lagerkvist, including nominations from the French authors and previous laureates André Gide and Roger Martin du Gard, and the Swedish Academy decided to award him the prize.

Lagerkvist died in Stockholm in 1974 at the age of 83; his wife had died in 1967.

== Works ==
=== Short Story Collections ===
- Människor (People) (1912)
- Två sagor om livet (2 Tales of Life) (1913)
- Järn och människor (Iron and People) (1915)
- Det eviga leendet (The Eternal Smile) (1920) - 3 stories
- Onda sagor (Wicked Tales) (1924)
- Kämpande ande (Fighting Spirit) (1930)
- I den tiden (In the Terms) (1935)
- Bröllopsfesten och andra berättelser (The Marriage Feast and Other Stories) (1955 - Chatto & Windus) - 19 stories : 18 stories translated by Alan Blair, and 1 story translated by Carl Eric Lindin. [It is not clear that there was a Swedish version of this particular book.]

=== Novels ===
- Gäst hos verkligheten (Guest of Reality) (1925)
- Den svåra resan (The Difficult Journey) (written c. 1926, published 1985)
- Själarnas maskerad (The Masquerade of Souls) (1930)
- Bödeln (The Executioner) (1933)
- Dvärgen (The Dwarf) (1944)
- Barabbas (1950, filmed in 1953, 1961, and 2012)
- Sibyllan (The Sibyl) (1956)
- Ahasverus död (The Death of Ahasuerus) (1960)
- Pilgrim på havet (Pilgrim on the Sea) (1962)
- Det heliga landet (The Holy Land) (1964)
- Mariamne (1967)

Prose and poetry

- Ordkonst och bildkonst (1913)
- Motiv (1914)
- Ångest (1916)
- Kaos (1919)
- Den lyckliges väg (1921)
- Hjärtats sånger (1926)
- Det besegrade livet (1927)
- Vid lägereld (1932)
- Den knutna näven ("The Clenched Fist", 1934)
- Genius (1937)
- Den befriade människan (1939)
- Sång och strid (1940)
- Hemmet och stjärnan (1942)
- Aftonland ("Evening Land", 1953)
- Antecknat (diaries and notes, 1977)

Theatre

- Sista mänskan, play ("The Last Man", 1917)
- Den svåra stunden, three one-act plays ("The Difficult Hour", 1918)
- Teater (1918)
- Himlens hemlighet, play ("The Secret of Heaven", 1919)
- Den osynlige, play ("The Invisible One", 1923)
- Han som fick leva om sitt liv, play ("The Man Who Lived his Life Over", 1928)
- Konungen, play ("The King", 1932)
- Bödeln, play ("The Hangman", 1933)
- Mannen utan själ, play ("The Man Without a Soul", 1936)
- Seger i mörkret, play ("Victory in the Dark", 1939)
- Midsommardröm i fattighuset, play ("Midsummer's Dream in the Workhouse", 1941)
- De vises sten, play ("The Philosopher's Stone", 1947)
- Låt människan leva, play ("Let Man Live", 1950)

== English translations ==
- "Literary Art and Pictorial Art" [Ordkonst och bildkonst], Rainbow Press, 1991, ISBN 0-9518535-0-3.
- "The Dwarf" [Dvärgen], Chatto & Windus, 1953; Hill and Wang, 1958, ISBN 0-374-52135-2.
- "Barabbas", Vintage, 1989, ISBN 0-679-72544-X.
- "The Sibyl" [Sibyllan], Vintage, 1963, ISBN 0-394-70240-9.
- "The Death of Ahasuerus" [Ahasverus död], Vintage, 1982, ISBN 0-394-70820-2.
- "Evening Land" [Aftonland], translated by W. H. Auden and Leif Sjöberg; Wayne State University Press, 1975; Souvenir Press, London, 1977, ISBN 0814315429.
- "Herod and Mariamne" [Mariamne], translated by Naomi Walford, Chatto & Windus Ltd, 1968, Alfred A. Knopf Inc, New York, 1968

Cultural offices
Preceded by Verner von Heidenstam	Swedish Academy, Seat No.8; 1940–1974	Succeeded by Östen Sjöstrand
