= Bar-Abba =

Bar-Abba or bar Abba ((Aramaic: בר-אבא, Bar-abbâ, "son of the father")) may refer to:

- Yeshua bar Abba, or Barabbas
- Abba bar Abba
- Tanhuma bar Abba
- Ḥiyya bar Abba
- Samuel bar Abba
