= Barabash =

Barabash is a surname. Notable people with the surname include:

- Alexey Barabash (born 1977), Russian actor
- Ekaterina Barabash (born 1961), France-based Russo-Ukrainian journalist
- Tatyana Barabash (1950–2001), Soviet/Russian speed skater
- Yakiv Barabash (died 1658), Zaporozhian Cossack ataman

== See also ==
- Barabas (disambiguation)
- Barabash (rural locality), a rural locality (a selo) in Russia
- Barbash (disambiguation), surname
