= Barabash (rural locality) =

Barabash Барабаш
- Village
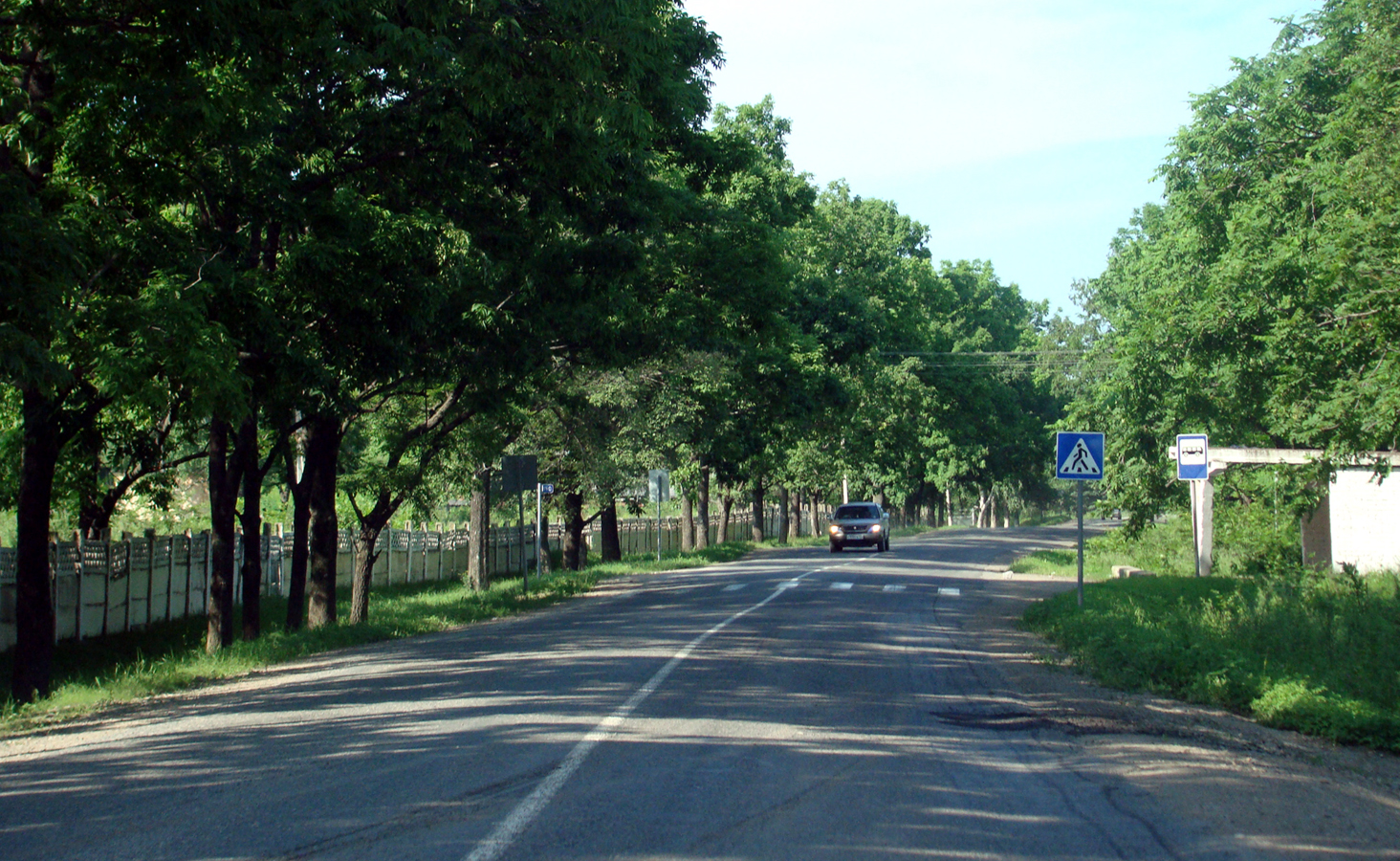
- A street in Barabash

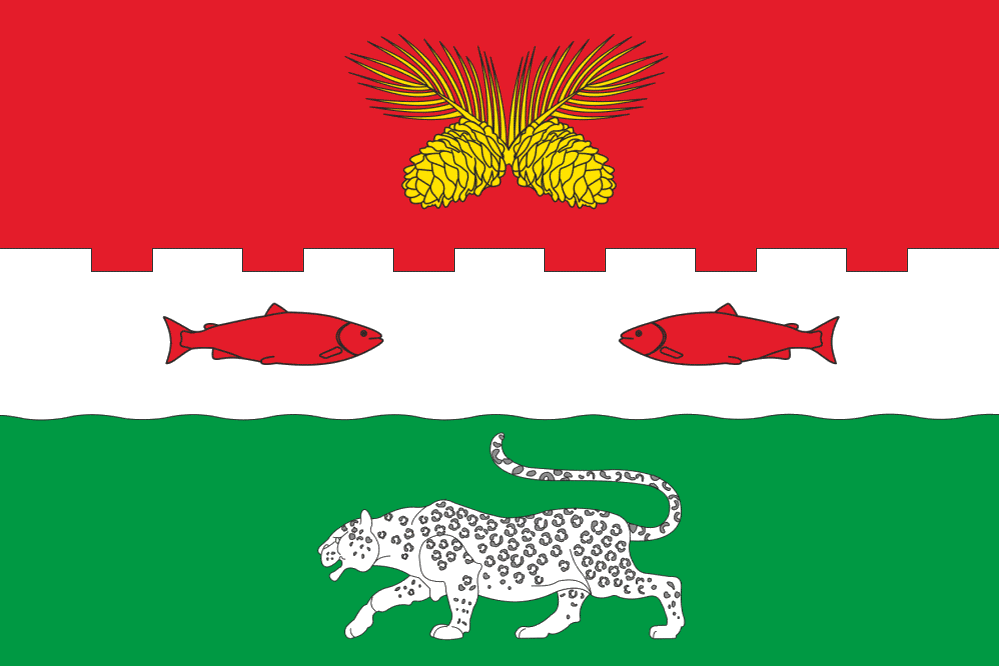
- Flag
- Interactive map of Barabash
- Location of Barabash Barabash (Primorsky Krai)
- Coordinates: 43°11′30″N 131°29′20″E
- Country: Russia
- Federal subject: Primorsky Krai
- Administrative district: Khasansky District
- Founded: 1884
- Elevation: 34 m (112 ft)

Population (2010 Census)
  - Total: 5,691
  - Estimate (2021): 2,269 (−60.1%)
- Time zone: UTC+10 (MSK+7)
- Postal code: 692723
- OKTMO ID: 05648402101

Barabash (Russian: Барабаш) is a rural locality (village), the administrative center of the Barabashsky Rural Settlement, part of the Khasansky District in Primorsky Krai in Russia.

== History ==
Barabash was founded in 1884 and was named after infantry general and senator Yakov Barabash, then-chairman of a commission on the delineation of the Russo-Chinese border. In 1937, Barabashky District was created with its center in the village, but on 7 May 1947 was replaced by Khasansky District when the district center moved to Khasan.

From 1955 until 2012, Barabash was the location of the headquarters of the 17th Guards Rifle Division and its successor formations.

== Demographics ==
Historical population
| Year | Pop. | ±% |
|---|---|---|
| 1939 | 3,161 | — |
| 2002 | 3,691 | +16.8% |
| 2010 | 5,691 | +54.2% |

According to the Russian Census of 2010, Barabash had 5,691 inhabitants, including 3,983 men (70%) and 1,708 women (30%). According to the Russian Census of 2002, it had 3,691 inhabitants, including 2,023 men (54.8%) and 1,668 women (45.2%).

== Notable people ==
- Viktor Suvorov (born 1947), writer and Soviet GRU defector
- Oleg Belokonev (born 1965), Belarusian general and military leader

== See also ==
- Barabas (disambiguation)
- Barabash (disambiguation), surname
- Barbash (disambiguation), surname
