= Eduard Kuznetsov (politician) =

Russian politician

- Эдуард Кузнецов

Deputy of the 8th State Duma
- Incumbent
- Assumed office 19 September 2021

Personal details
- Born: 6 August 1967 (age 59) Barabash, Primorsky Krai, Russian Soviet Federative Socialist Republic, USSR
- Party: United Russia
- Education: Sverdlovsk Higher Military-Political Tank Artillery School

Eduard Kuznetsov (Russian: Эдуард Анатольевич Кузнецов; born 6 August 1967) is a Russian political figure and a deputy of the 8th State Duma.

== Career ==
Kuznetsov was born in Barabash. In 1988, he graduated from the Sverdlovsk Higher Military-Political Tank Artillery School. From 1994 to 2001, he worked in various commercial organizations and later continued his career at the state authorities of the Krasnodar Krai. Soon he became a member of the Russian Union of Industrialists and Entrepreneurs. From 2017 to 2021, he was the deputy of the Legislative Assembly of Krasnodar Krai. Since September 2021, he has served as deputy of the 8th State Duma.

== Sanctions ==
In December 2022 the EU sanctioned Eduard Kuznetsov in relation to the 2022 Russian invasion of Ukraine.
