= William Fulco =

American Jesuit scholar (1936–2021)

Father William Fulco SJ

Personal life
- Born: William James Fulco; February 24, 1936 Los Angeles, California, U.S.
- Died: November 29, 2021 (aged 85) Los Gatos, California, U.S.

Religious life
- Religion: Catholic Church
- Order: Society of Jesus

Academic background
- Education: Santa Clara University; Gonzaga University; Yale University

William James Fulco SJ (February 24, 1936 – November 29, 2021) was an American Jesuit priest and National Endowment for the Humanities Professor of Ancient Mediterranean Studies at Loyola Marymount University in Los Angeles, California.

Fulco was born in Los Angeles. He entered the Society of Jesus in August 1954 and was ordained a priest in June 1966. He spent most of his career in education.

Fulco died on November 29, 2021.

== Early life and education ==
Fulco was born to Dr. Herman J. Fulco and Clelia Marie DeFeo Fulco in the Leimert Park area of Los Angeles. He had a brother, Dr. Armand Fulco, and sister, Yvonne Henriks. He graduated from Loyola High School. He later joined the Society of Jesus in 1954 and was ordained in 1966. Fulco earned his B.A. and Licentiate of Sacred Theology from Jesuit School of Theology, Berkeley, California (now Santa Clara University) and his M.A. at Gonzaga University. Fulco finished his Ph.D. in Near Eastern languages and literatures from Yale University.

Father William Fulco was fluent in nine languages including English, Spanish, Greek, Latin, Aramaic, Arabic, Hebrew, German.

== Loyola Marymount University ==
Fuclo began teaching at Loyola Marymount University (LMU) in Los Angeles in August 1998. He founded the school's Classics and Archaeology department within the Bellarmine College of Liberal Arts. He was awarded the National Endowment for the Humanities Chair of Ancient Mediterranean Studies.

During his teaching career, he taught courses on topics including Greek and Latin for medicine, archaeology and the Bible, and Mediterranean studies.

Fuclo was also active in the Sigma Phi Epsilon fraternity on LMU's campus. He was the faculty advisor from 2002 to 2019, and was awarded by the national organization with the 2011 SigEp Citation, Volunteer of the Year, and Distinguished Alumnus awards.

Father William Fulco retired from teaching in 2019.

== Collaboration in the film The Passion of the Christ ==
He was hired to translate the dialogues for the film The Passion of the Christ (2004), by Mel Gibson, into a hypothetical reconstructed form of Aramaic, the Aramaic that Jesus spoke, making him one of the few professional historical linguists specializing in the production (or more precisely translation) of texts in unattested or poorly attested languages known to have existed, with a focus on the needs of the movie industry. Fulco does not reconstruct grammars (open generative structures) of poorly attested or unattested language forms known to have existed. Rather, he reconstructs finite texts in these language forms, and the reconstruction is limited to the necessities of the production of such texts. His reconstructed Aramaic used in the film incorporated elements of the Biblical Aramaic of the Book of Daniel, fourth-century Syriac, and Hebrew. Fulco has also worked on such films as The Nativity Story and Constantine.

== Personal life ==
Fulco was public about his alcoholism from 1968 to 1985. He was able to become sober via a Washington, D.C., program. Fulco later helped others via community alcohol addiction groups. During the late 1980s, Fulco recalled the alcohol groups nearly turned into AIDS support groups as the AIDS epidemic tore through the United States and the groups became a place to mourn loved ones and find community. He recalls it was one of the most profound times in his life and "these people had learned how to live in a way I hadn't. I had to learn from them."

Fulco died November 29, 2021, at Sacred Heart Jesuit Center in Los Gatos from pulmonary fibrosis at the age of 85.
