= Barabbas (1961 film) =

1961 film by Richard Fleischer

- Theatrical release poster by Frank McCarthy
- Directed by: Richard Fleischer
- Screenplay by: Christopher Fry (Note: The screenplay includes uncredited contributions from Nigel Balchin, Diego Fabbri, Ivo Perilli and Salvatore Quasimodo.)
- Based on: Barabbas (1950 novel) by Pär Lagerkvist
- Produced by: Dino De Laurentiis
- Starring: Anthony Quinn; Silvana Mangano; Arthur Kennedy; Katy Jurado; Harry Andrews; Vittorio Gassman; Jack Palance; Ernest Borgnine
- Cinematography: Aldo Tonti
- Edited by: Raymond Poulton
- Music by: Mario Nascimbene
- Production company: Dino de Laurentiis Cinematografica
- Distributed by: Dino de Laurentiis Cinematografica (Italy); Columbia Pictures (U.S.)
- Release dates: December 23, 1961 (Italy); October 10, 1962 (U.S.)
- Running time: 137 minutes
- Countries: Italy; United States
- Language: English
- Box office: $2.9 million (US/Canada)

Barabbas (Italian: Barabba) is a 1961 religious epic film directed by Richard Fleischer and produced by Dino De Laurentiis, expanding on the life of Barabbas, from the Christian Passion narrative in the Gospel of Mark and other gospels. It stars Anthony Quinn, Silvana Mangano, Katy Jurado, Arthur Kennedy, Harry Andrews, Ernest Borgnine, Vittorio Gassman, and Jack Palance. The screenplay is based on Swedish author Pär Lagerkvist's 1950 novel.

The film was shot in Verona and Rome. It included many highly acclaimed scenes, including a battle of gladiators in a Cinecittà film studio mock-up of the Colosseum, and a crucifixion shot during an actual total solar eclipse. It was released in Italy on December 23, 1961, and in the United States by Columbia Pictures on October 10, 1962. In Italy, the film was nominated for three Nastro d'Argento Awards (Best Cinematography, Best Production Design, and Best Costume Design).

A previous film version of the novel, in Swedish, had been made in 1953.

== Plot ==
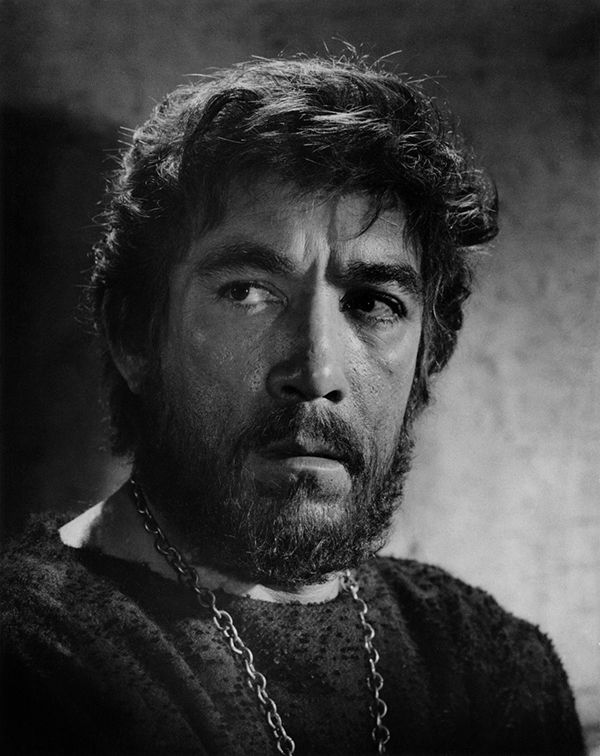
Anthony Quinn as Barabbas in a publicity photograph for the film

Pontius Pilate offers to release either Jesus of Nazareth or Barabbas, in keeping with the Passover custom. The crowd gathered for the pardoning chooses Barabbas, and Jesus is condemned to crucifixion, while Barabbas is set free. Returning to his friends, Barabbas asks for his lover, Rachel. His friends inform him that Rachel has become a follower of Christ. Rachel soon returns, but she is not happy to see Barabbas, and they tussle physically.

Barabbas witnesses the crucifixion of Jesus. As Jesus dies, the sky turns black, and Barabbas is shaken. He watches Christ's body sealed in the tomb. On the third morning, Barabbas finds the tomb open. Rachel tells him that Christ has risen, but Barabbas says it is an illusion or his followers have stolen the body. He visits the apostles; they do not know where he is, but also believe he is risen.

Rachel preaches in Jerusalem about Jesus Christ himself and is stoned to death at the insistence of the priests. Barabbas, guilt-ridden, returns to his criminal ways and tries to rob a caravan transporting several of the priests. When the robbery goes bad, Barabbas does not try to flee, and he is captured by Roman soldiers. The law forbids Pilate from executing someone who has previously been pardoned, so he sentences Barabbas to lifelong slavery in the sulfur mines of Sicily.

Barabbas survives this hellish existence for the next twenty years. He is chained to Sahak, a Christian sailor who was sent to the mines for allowing slaves to escape. Sahak at first hates Barabbas for being pardoned instead of "the Master", but the two men eventually become friends. Over time, Sahak becomes too weak to work. As the guards are about to kill him, the mine is destroyed in an earthquake, with Sahak and Barabbas the only survivors. Julia, the superstitious wife of the local prefect, considers them blessed. The prefect is due to leave for Rome, having been appointed to the Senate. Julia insists that Barabbas and Sahak accompany him for good luck.

Once in Rome, the men are trained to become gladiators by Torvald, the top gladiator in Rome. After a gladiatorial event, Sahak is overheard sharing his faith with other gladiators, and is condemned to death for treason, in this case practicing a non state sanctioned religion. When a squad deliberately miss throwing their spears, Torvald executes Sahak. The next day, Torvald and Barabbas battle in the arena. Barabbas wins, killing Torvald and impressing Emperor Nero, who sets him free. Barabbas takes Sahak's corpse to the catacombs, where the local Christians are worshiping. They give him a proper burial.

Barabbas becomes lost in the catacombs. When he eventually emerges, Rome is on fire. Barabbas is told that the Christians started the fire. Believing that the end of the world has come (as Rachel and Sahak had taught), Barabbas sets fire to more buildings. He is confronted by Roman soldiers and tells them that he is a follower of Christ. He is imprisoned with several other Christians, among them the apostle Peter. Peter admonishes Barabbas for committing arson, informing him that Christians would not do such a thing. Afterwards, the Christians are executed by mass crucifixion in the persecutions that follow the fire. Having finally placed his faith in Christ, Barabbas is crucified with the others, though his last words are, "Darkness... I give myself up into your keeping... It is Barabbas".

== Cast ==
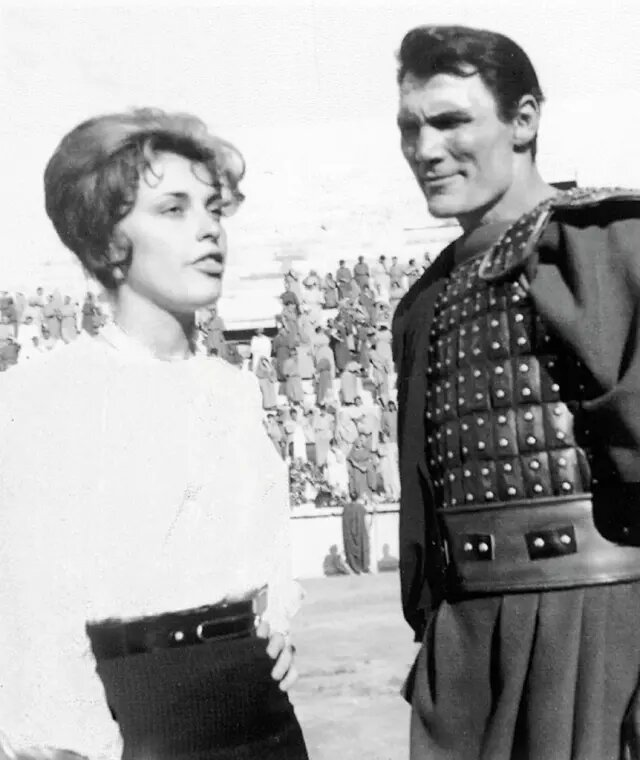
Sharon Tate and Jack Palance behind the scenes of the film

- Anthony Quinn as Barabbas
- Arthur Kennedy as Pontius Pilate
- Jack Palance as Torvald
- Silvana Mangano as Rachel
- Harry Andrews as Peter
- Ernest Borgnine as Lucius
- Katy Jurado as Sara
- Vittorio Gassman as Sahak
- Norman Wooland as Rufio
- Valentina Cortese as Julia
- Arnoldo Foà as Joseph of Arimathea
- Michael Gwynn as Lazarus
- Laurence Payne as Disciple
- Douglas Fowley as Vasasio
- Guido Celano as Scorpio
- Enrico Glori as Pleading Man
- Carlo Giustini as Officer
- Gianni di Benedetto as Officer
- Robert Hall as Commander of Gladiators
- Rina Braido as Tavern Reveler
- Tullio Tomadoni as Blind Man
- Joe Robinson as Gladiator
- Frederich Ledebur as Officer
- Spartaco Nale as Overseer
- Maria Zanoli as Beggar Woman
- Vladimiro Picciafuochi as Guard

Uncredited

- Roy Mangano as Jesus Christ
- Paola Pitagora as Mary Magdalene
- Rina Franchetti as Mary of Clopas
- Piero Pastore as Nicodemus
- Vera Drudi as Salome
- Nino Segurini as Apostle John
- Jacopo Tecchi as Apostle Thomas
- Ivan Triesault as Emperor Nero
- Walter Maslow as Disciple
- Sharon Tate as Patrician
- Joan Young as Prisoner

== Production ==
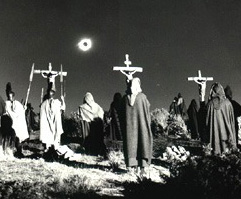
The scene where the solar eclipse of February 15, 1961, was used to recreate the crucifixion darkness

Before major casting began, Yul Brynner was actively considered for the title role of Barabbas, yet never got the part. His previous Biblical film roles were Rameses II in The Ten Commandments and Solomon in Solomon and Sheba.

The music score by Mario Nascimbene, which was conducted by Franco Ferrara, the noted conductor and lecturer on conducting at several famous international academies, was noted for its unusual, stark experimental component – the composer referred to his work, which included the introduction of electronic sounds achieved by the manipulation of tape speeds, as "new sounds". The main theme was based on the "Kyrie" from "Orbis Factor: Missa XI" which is a part of the Roman Catholic Ordinary. The depiction of the crucifixion was filmed on 15 February 1961 during an actual total eclipse of the sun.

=== Differences from the book ===
In Pär Lagerkvist's original novel, Barabbas' later crime that sends him into slavery is left vague. He is sent to the copper mines of Cyprus, rather than Sicily as in the film. Sahak (Vittorio Gassman) and Barabbas (Anthony Quinn) are freed from the mines by an overseer friendly to Christians, rather than it being destroyed by an earthquake. There are no gladiatorial scenes anywhere in the book, as Barabbas is made a field slave and then a house slave to his Roman owner.

== Reception ==
Barabbas received positive reviews; it currently holds an 89% approval rating on Rotten Tomatoes, based on 9 reviews with an average rating of 6.8/10.

=== Awards and nominations ===
- Nominee Best Color Cinematography - Italian National Syndicate of Film Journalists (Aldo Tonti)
- Nominee Best Costume Design - Italian National Syndicate of Film Journalists (Maria De Matteis)
- Nominee Best Production Design - Italian National Syndicate of Film Journalists (Mario Chiari)
- Selected Top Foreign Films of the Year - National Board of Review

== See also ==
- 1961 in film
- List of Italian films of 1961
- List of Easter films
- List of films featuring eclipses
