= Barabas (disambiguation) =

Barabas, an alternative spelling of Barabbas, may refer to:

== People ==
- Andrei Barabaș (1937–2005), Romanian middle-distance runner
- A. P. Barabas, British surgeon, a namesake of the Sack–Barabas syndrome
- Béla Barabás (1855–1934), Hungarian politician
- Enikő Barabás (born 1986), Romanian rower
- Lőrinc Barabás (born 1983), Hungarian jazz musician
- Miklós Barabás (1810–1898), Hungarian painter
- Pál Barabás (1902–1945), Hungarian writer
- Pavol Barabáš (born 1959), Slovak film director
- Sari Barabas (1914–2012), Hungarian operatic soprano
- Tom Barabas (1934–2020), American-Hungarian pianist/keyboardist

== Fictional characters ==
- Karabas Barabas, a villain in the Russian children's story The Golden Key, or the Adventures of Buratino
- Barabas (character) the lead character of the Christopher Marlowe play The Jew of Malta

== Places ==
- Barabás, a village in Hungary

== Music ==
- "Barabas", a song from Hooverphonic

== See also ==
- Barabash
- Barabbas (disambiguation)
- Barrabas (disambiguation)
