= Barabbas (novel) =

1950 novel by Pär Lagerkvist

- First edition
- Author: Pär Lagerkvist
- Translator: Alan Blair
- Language: Swedish
- Genre: Historical novel
- Publisher: Albert Bonniers förlag
- Publication date: 1950
- Publication place: Sweden
- Media type: Print (Hardback & Paperback)
- Pages: 144
- ISBN: 0-7011-0879-7

Barabbas is a 1950 novel by Pär Lagerkvist. It tells a version of the life of Barabbas, the man whom the Bible relates was released instead of Jesus. The novel is built on antithesis: Jesus dies first among the three crucified – Barabbas dies last. Jesus dies among several of his friends – Barabbas dies alone. Jesus talks to God – Barabbas talks to the darkness. The novel starts with Jesus' crucifixion and ends with Barabbas' crucifixion in Rome.

== Plot ==
Jesus is crucified on Mount Golgotha. To the side of the crowd stands Barabbas. A violent man, a brigand, and a rebel, he cannot muster much respect for the resignation of the Man who died in his place. He is skeptical about the Holiness of Jesus, but he is also fascinated by His sacrifice. He seeks out different followers of Jesus in trying to understand Him, but finds that their exalted views of Jesus do not match his down-to-earth observation of Him. More important, since Barabbas has never been the recipient of love (the cornerstone of the Christian faith), he finds that he is unable to understand love and, hence, unable to understand the Christian faith. He says that he "wants to believe," but for Barabbas, understanding is a prerequisite for belief, so he is unable to.

Enslaved, shackled to another man named Sahak, and condemned to work in the notoriously life-shortening and infernal copper mines of Ancient Rome, Barabbas has an extraordinary crisis of faith, the exact nature of which is elucidated in the final portion of the novel. Barabbas's ultimate loyalties lie with the opaque, remorseless void that fed and surrounded his former life, manifested in the darkness of the night of his execution, which he surrenders himself to with his final breath.

== Reception ==
Barabbas was an immediate and huge sales success in Sweden and was quickly translated to at least ten languages. The French critic Marcel Brion wrote in Le Monde on 7 December 1950: “The unprecedented human value and universal importance of this book cannot possibly be doubted”. A few months later, another critic in the same publication also praised the novel, saying "We are rarely brought face-to-face with a work of such depth and brilliance as this”. The novel provoked a discussion among Swedish critics about religious matters, such as belief, doubt and the question of suffering in Christianity. Some critics discussed it in the light of the existential wounds caused by World War II.

== Film and theatrical adaptations ==
- A Swedish film made in 1953 by Alf Sjöberg was entered in the Cannes Film Festival.
- The novel was turned into a film by Richard Fleischer in 1961, starring Anthony Quinn.
- A 2012 American-Italian television movie was directed by Roger Young.

== Web ==
- Nobel Award Ceremony speech
