= Barabbas (1953 film) =

1953 film

- Film poster
- Directed by: Alf Sjöberg
- Written by: Pär Lagerkvist; Alf Sjöberg
- Produced by: Rune Waldekranz
- Starring: Ulf Palme
- Cinematography: Sven Nykvist; Göran Strindberg
- Edited by: Eric Nordemar
- Distributed by: Sandrews
- Release date: 5 May 1953
- Running time: 119 minutes
- Country: Sweden
- Language: Swedish

Barabbas is a 1953 Swedish drama film directed by Alf Sjöberg. It is based on the 1950 novel Barabbas by Pär Lagerkvist about the biblical character who was released instead of Jesus. The film was entered in the 1953 Cannes Film Festival. It was one of the biggest Swedish productions of its time. In 1961 an American adaptation of the same novel was released, starring Anthony Quinn in the lead role.

== Cast ==
- Ulf Palme as Barabbas
- Georg Årlin as Lazarus
- Hugo Björne as Leper at Death Valley
- Eva Dahlbeck as The Mother
- Sture Ericson as Father of hare-lipped
- Sven-Eric Gamble as Christian in slave caves at Rome
- Åke Grönberg as Armful watchman at Rome
- Erik Hell as Man at Jerusalem
- Anders Henrikson as Roman procurator on Cyprus
- Barbro Hiort af Ornäs as Maria of Magdala
- Jarl Kulle as Leper at Death Valley
- Torsten Lilliecrona as Supervisor at copper mine on Cyprus
- Peter Lindgren as Soldier which assaulted gang
- Yvonne Lombard as Prostitute
- Holger Löwenadler as Thief
- Stig Olin as Member of Barabbas' gang
- Per Oscarsson as Boy
- Gösta Prüzelius as Member of Barabbas' gang
- Sif Ruud as Fat Woman
- Gunnar Sjöberg as Supervisor at copper mine on Cyprus
- Erik Strandmark as Petrus

== Production ==
After a year of preparation, shooting started in the spring of 1952 in Israel and Rome, and then moved to Sweden for interior scenes during the summer. As the assigned cinematographer Göran Strindberg became ill early during production, the still up-and-coming Sven Nykvist, later star cinematographer for Ingmar Bergman, had to replace him for the exterior shots. Additional filming occurred during the autumn and into December.
