= Barabbas =

Figure mentioned in the New Testament

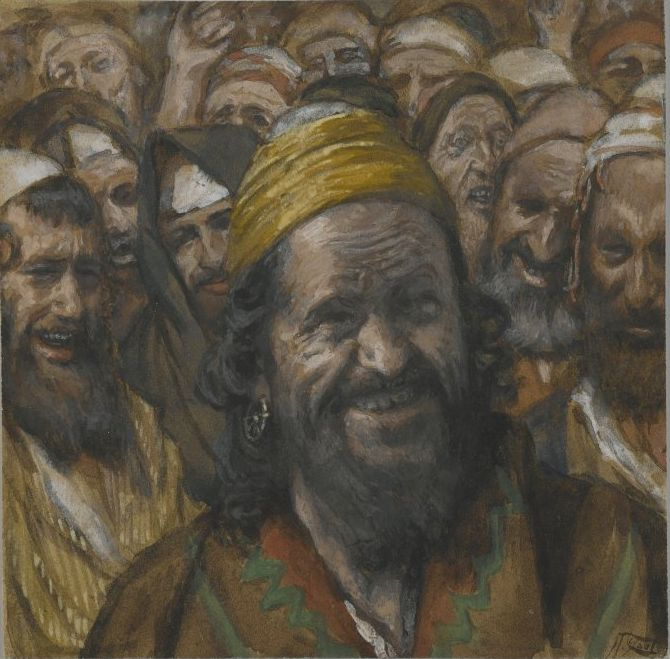
- Portrait by James Tissot, c. 1886–1894
- Occupation: Bandit
- Known for: Pardoned by Pontius Pilate instead of Jesus

According to the New Testament, Barabbas (Note: /bəˈræbəs/; Biblical Greek: Bαραββᾶς, romanized: Barabbās) or Jesus Barabbas (fl. 1st cent.) was a Jewish bandit who was imprisoned by the Roman occupation in Jerusalem, only to be chosen over Jesus of Nazareth by a crowd of Judean citizens and Passover pilgrims to be pardoned by Roman governor Pontius Pilate at the Passover feast.

== Biblical account ==
According to all four canonical gospels, there was a prevailing Passover custom in Jerusalem that allowed Pontius Pilate, the praefectus or governor of Judea, to commute one prisoner's death sentence by popular acclaim. In one such instance, the "crowd" (ὄχλος : óchlos), "the Jews" and "the multitude" in some sources, are offered the choice to have either Barabbas or Jesus released from Roman custody. According to the Synoptic Gospels of Matthew, Mark, and Luke, and the account in John, the crowd chooses Barabbas to be released and Jesus of Nazareth to be crucified. Pilate reluctantly yields to the insistence of the crowd. One passage, found in the Gospel of Matthew, has the crowd saying (of Jesus), "Let his blood be upon us and upon our children."

Matthew refers to Barabbas only as a "notorious prisoner". Mark and Luke further refer to Barabbas as one involved in a στάσις (stásis, a riot), probably "one of the numerous insurrections against the Roman power" who had committed murder. Robert Eisenman states that John 18:40 refers to Barabbas as a λῃστής (lēistēs, "bandit"), "the word Josephus always employs when talking about Revolutionaries". (Note: Contemporaries combining insurrection and murder in this way were sicarii, members of a militant Jewish movement that sought to overthrow the Roman occupiers of their land by force (Eisenman 177–84, et passim).)

Three gospels state that there was a custom that at Passover the Roman governor would release a prisoner of the crowd's choice. Later copies of Luke contain a corresponding verse, although this is not present in the earliest manuscripts, and may be a later gloss to bring Luke into conformity.

The custom of releasing prisoners in Jerusalem at Passover is known to theologians as the Paschal Pardon, but this custom, whether at Passover or any other time, is not recorded in any historical document other than the gospels, leading some to question its historicity and make further claims that such a custom was a theological narrative of the Gospel writers. Geza Vermes states that Mishnah texts do not show an established Roman custom, but Jewish hopes or a general release which was later dramatized.

== Name ==
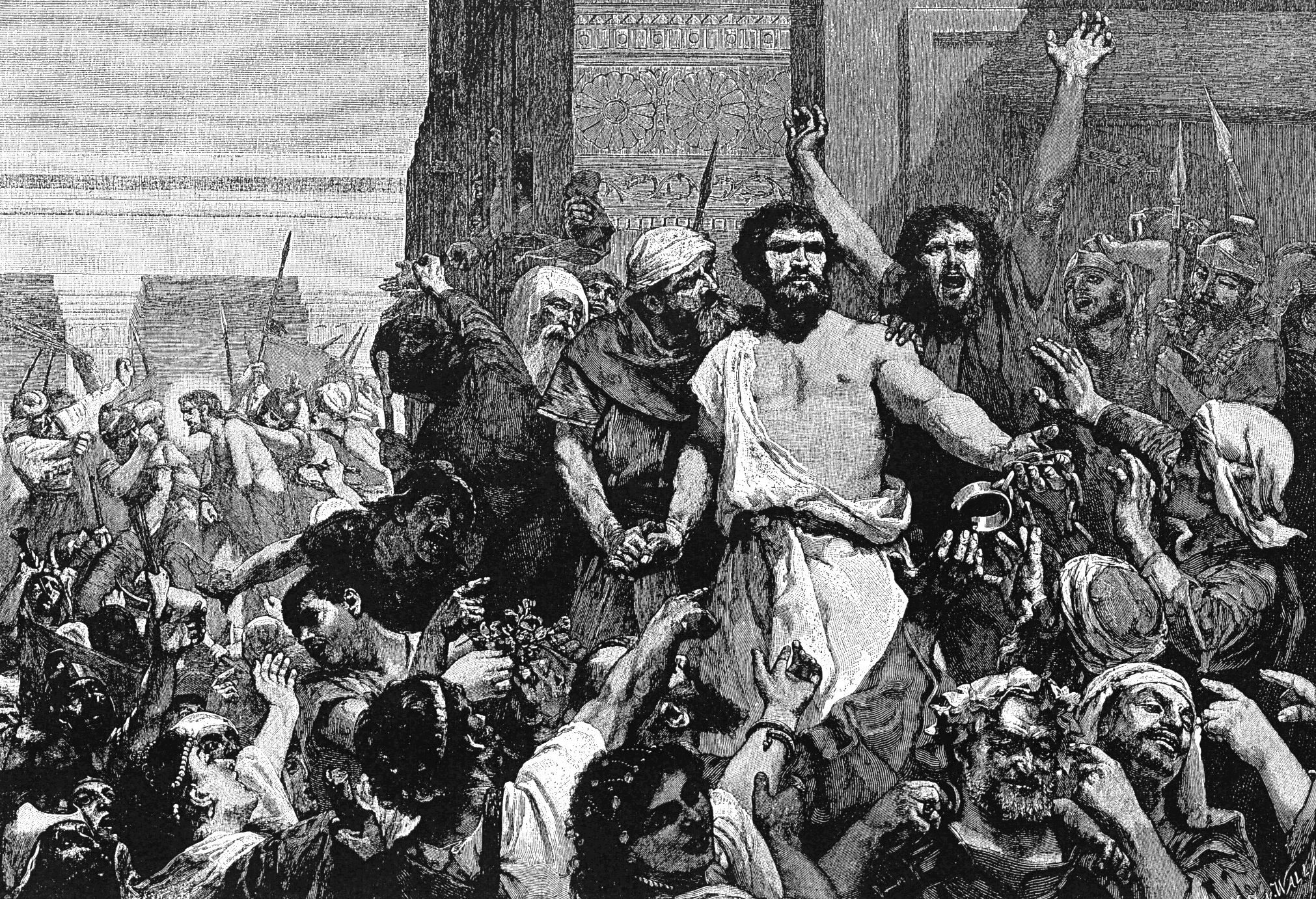
Barabbas, according to a representation in The Bible and Its Story Taught by One Thousand Picture Lessons, from 1910

There exist several versions of this figure's name in gospel manuscripts, most commonly simply Biblical Greek: Bαραββᾶς, romanized: Barabbās without a first name. However the variations (Biblical Greek: Ἰησοῦς Bαῤῥαββᾶν, romanized: Iēsoûs Bar-rhabbân, Biblical Greek: Ἰησοῦς Bαραββᾶς, romanized: Iēsoûs Barabbâs, Biblical Greek: Ἰησοῦς Bαῤῥαββᾶς, romanized: Iēsoûs Bar-rhabbâs) found in different manuscripts of the Matthew 27:16–17 give this figure the first name "Jesus", making his full name "Jesus Barabbas" or "Jesus Bar-rhabban", and giving him the same first, given name as Jesus. (Note: This version of the name in Greek can be found the Codex Koridethi, some minuscules of Family 1 manuscripts, and in Minuscule 700 – translations of this version name also exist in Syriac and Armenian sources, such as the Codex Syrus Sinaiticus, the Harklean version, and in the Bible used by the Armenian Apostolic Church. The Codex Koridethi spells the name Biblical Greek: Ἰησοῦς Bαῤῥαββᾶν, romanized: Iēsoûs Bar-rhabbân with an emphazied gap between the two Rhos.)

The Codex Koridethi seems to emphasise Bar-rhabban as composed of two elements in line with a patronymic Aramaic name. These versions, featuring the first name "Jesus" are considered original by a number of modern scholars.

Origen seems to refer to this passage of Matthew in claiming that it must be a corruption, as no sinful man ever bore the name "Jesus" and argues for its exclusion from the text. He however does not account for the high priest Jason (Biblical Greek: Ἰάσων, romanized: Iásōn) from 2 Maccabees 4:13, whose name seems to transliterate the same Aramaic name into Greek, as well as other bearers of the name Jesus mentioned by Josephus. It is possible that scribes when copying the passage, driven by a reasoning similar to that of Origen, removed this first name "Jesus" from the text to avoid dishonor to the name of the Jesus whom they considered the Messiah.

=== Etymology ===
Of the two larger categories in which transmitted versions of this name fall Biblical Greek: Bαῤῥαββᾶν, romanized: Bar-rhabbân, seems to represent Jewish Palestinian Aramaic: בּר רַבָּן, romanized: Bar Rabbān, lit. 'Son of our Rabbi/Master', while Biblical Greek: Bαραββᾶς, romanized: Barabbâs appears to derive ultimately from Jewish Palestinian Aramaic: בּר אַבָּא, romanized: Bar ʾAbbā lit. 'Son of ʾAbbā/[the] father, a patronymic Aramaic name. However, ʾAbbā has been found as a personal name in a 1st-century burial at Giv'at ha-Mivtar. Additionally it appears fairly often as a personal name in the Gemara section of the Talmud, a Jewish text dating from AD 200–400.

== Historicity ==
Scholars such as Craig A. Evans and N. T. Wright accept the historicity of the Passover pardon narrative, quoting evidence of such pardons from Livy's Books from the Foundation of the City, Josephus's Antiquities of the Jews, Papyrus Florence, Pliny the Younger's Epistles and the Mishnah.

The similarities of the name (Biblical Greek: Ἰησοῦς Bαραββᾶς, romanized: Iēsoûs Barabbâs) in some manuscripts and the name of Jesus have led some modern scholars to argue that the counter-intuitive similarity of the two men's names is evidence of its historicity. They doubt a Christian writer would invent a similar name for a criminal, practically equating Christ with a criminal, if he were inventing the story for a polemical or theological purpose.

Contrarian positions include Max Dimont, who argues against the believability of the Barabbas story by noting that the alleged custom of privilegium Paschale, "the privilege of Passover", where a criminal is set free, is only found in the Gospels. For Dimont, Barabbas' narrative lacks credibility from both the Roman and Jewish standpoint. Raymond E. Brown contends that the Gospel narratives about Barabbas cannot be considered historical, but that it is probable that a prisoner referred to as Barabbas (bar abba, "son of the father") was freed around the period Jesus was crucified, and this gave birth to the story.

Bart D. Ehrman notes the story is not in Pontius Pilate's character to release an insurrectionist for the Jews, as well as commenting that the name Barabbas "son of the father" is interestingly similar to Jesus' role as the Son of God.

E. P. Sanders argued the writers took a kernel of historical reality of a prisoner being released to celebrate a holiday, and transformed it into dramatic trial scenes and "choice of two criminals". Jennifer K. Breanson reasons the episode is a literary creation, which encodes ritual symbolism with the transformation of Leviticus 16 into a passion drama.

A minority of scholars, including Benjamin Urrutia, Stevan Davies, Hyam Maccoby, and Horace Abram Rigg, have contended that Barabbas and Jesus were the same historical figure. Luca di Basi critiqued the "identity thesis" of Davis, Maccoby and others, which presents Jesus originally as a political agitator, with later pro-Roman editors making deliberate contrasts to distance Christianity from Jewish militancy.

== Antisemitism ==
The story of Barabbas has played a role in historical antisemitism, because it has historically been used to lay the blame for the crucifixion of Jesus on the Jews, and thereby to justify antisemitism – an interpretation known as Jewish deicide. Pope Benedict XVI, in his 2011 book Jesus of Nazareth, dismisses this reading, since the Greek word ὄχλος (óchlos) in Mark 15:6–15 means "crowd", rather than "Jewish people".

John Dominic Crossan of the Jesus Seminar, described the passion parable as being written long after the 66-70 AD Jewish-Roman war, seeing it as "prophecy historicized" rather than "history remembered". For Crossan, the authors used this scene to show the generation of Jews at Jerusalem chose a path of violence and physical messianism symbolized by Barabbas, and reaped their own destruction by rejecting the teachings of the spiritual Jesus. He also noted a steady exoneration of Rome of any fault, with the placing of full responsibility on the Jews.

== In literature ==
Samuel Crossman's English hymn "My Song Is Love Unknown" (published 1684) contains this verse alluding anonymously to Barabbas as "a murderer"

They rise, and needs will have
my dear Lord made away;
a murderer they save,
the Prince of Life they slay.
Yet cheerful He
to suffering goes,
that He His foes
from thence might free.

Barabbas is the main character in the novel Barabbas (1950) by Pär Lagerkvist.

== See also ==
- Biblical criticism
- Historicity of Jesus
- Textual criticism
