= Julien Gouyet =

19th-century French Catholic priest

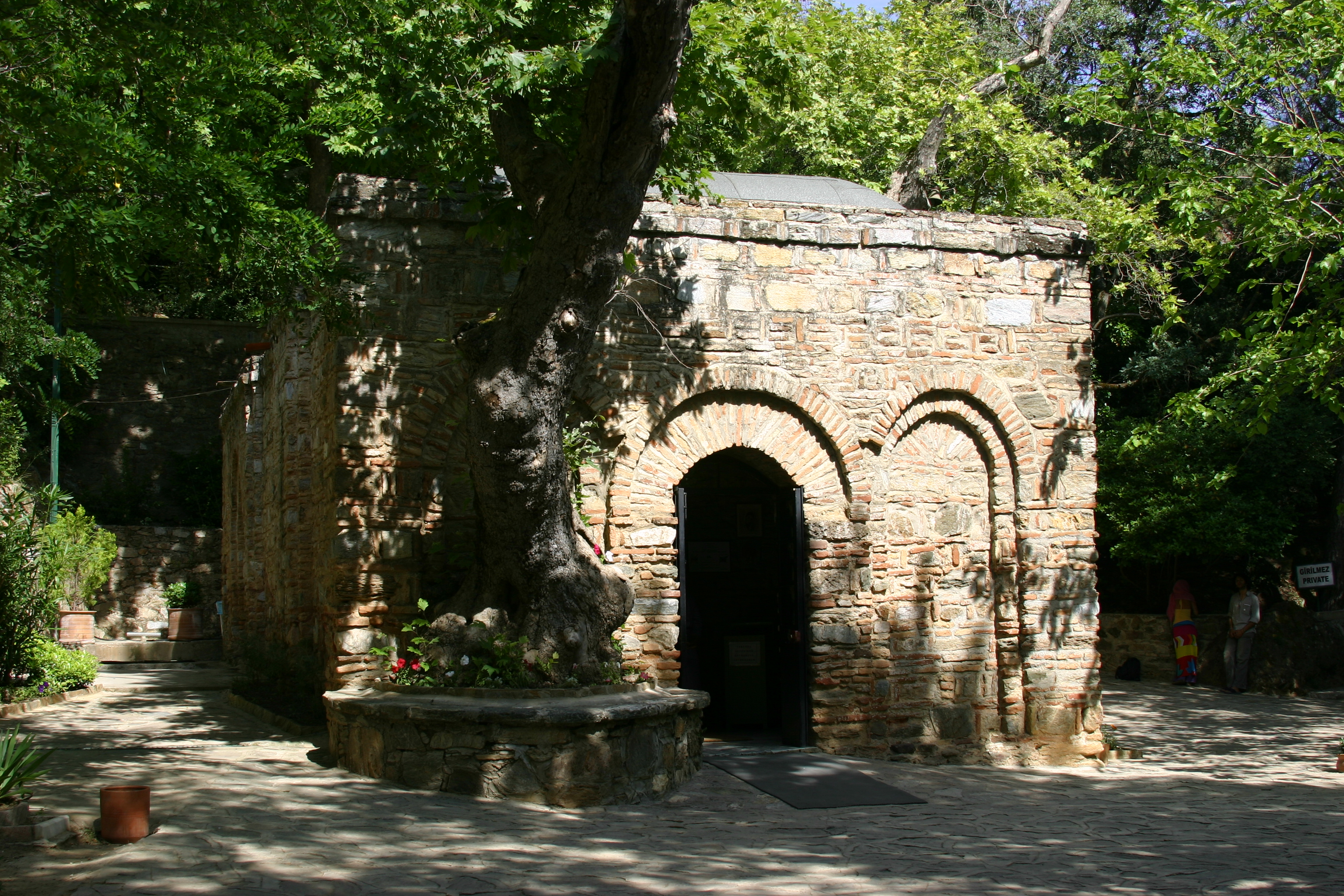
House of the Virgin Mary

Julien Gouyet (1828 – 4 April 1899) was a French Catholic priest from Paris, credited with discovering the location of the House of the Virgin Mary near Ephesus in Turkey. Some accounts mistakenly state that Gouyet was a member of the Vincentian (Lazarist) Order.

In 1881, led by the visions of Jesus of the Blessed Anne Catherine Emmerich (Klemens Brentano, 1852), Gouyet discovered a house near Ephesus in Turkey, said to be the House of the Virgin Mary. Pope Leo XIII visited in 1896, and in 1951 Pope Pius XII declared it a Holy Place. Pope John XXIII made the declaration permanent, and popes Paul VI (1967), John Paul II (1979) and Benedict XVI (2006) all visited the shrine.

Gouyet wrote a book about his discoveries titled Découverte dans la montagne d'Ephèse de la maison où la très Sainte Vierge est morte et fouilles à faire pour découvrir aussi le tombeau d'ou elle s'est élévée au ciel (Paris: Bray et Retaux, 1898; Discovery in the Mountains of Ephesus of the House where the Most Holy Virgin died, and Excavations to be undertaken to also uncover the Tomb from which she Ascended to Heaven). A different edition of this work also appeared in 1898, under the title Découverte de la maison de la T.S. Vierge dans la montagne d'Éphèse, fouilles à faire pour découvrire son tombeau, qui y est caché (Paris: Oeuvre de Saint-Paul, 1898; Discovery of the House of the Most Holy Virgin in the Mountains of Ephesus; Excavations to be undertaken to uncover her Tomb, which lies hidden there).

== See also ==
- Marie de Mandat-Grancey
