= Anne Catherine Emmerich =

Beatified German Augustinian canoness and mystic (1774–1824)

Blessed Anne Catherine Emmerich CRV
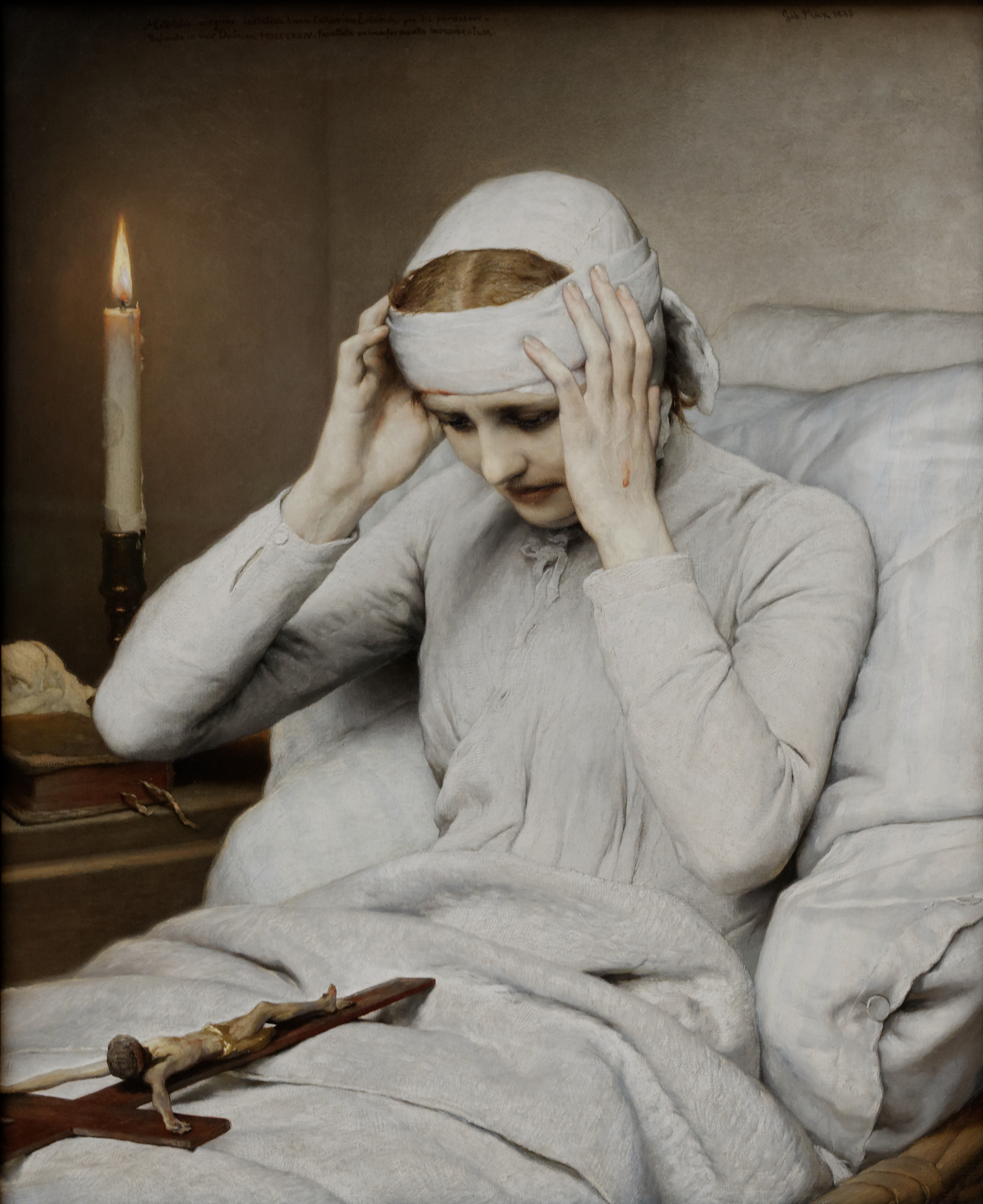
- Catherine Emmerich with a crucifix as depicted by Gabriel von Max (1885)

Christian Virgin and Penitent; Marian Visionary and Stigmatist
- Born: 8 September 1774; Flamschen, Coesfeld, Prince-Bishopric of Münster, Holy Roman Empire
- Died: 9 February 1824 (aged 49); Dülmen, Kingdom of Prussia, German Confederation
- Venerated in: Catholic Church
- Beatified: 3 October 2004, Basilica of Saint Peter, Vatican City by Pope John Paul II
- Feast: 9 February
- Attributes: Bedridden with bandaged head and holding a crucifix

Anne Catherine Emmerich, CRV (also Anna Katharina Emmerick; 8 September 1774 – 9 February 1824) was a Catholic Augustinian canoness of the Congregation of Windesheim. During her lifetime, she was a mystic, Marian visionary and stigmatist.

Emmerich was born in Flamschen, an impoverished farming community at Coesfeld, in the Diocese of Münster, Westphalia, Germany, and died in Dülmen (aged 49), where she had lived, bedridden, as a nun. Emmerich purportedly experienced visions of the life and Passion of Jesus Christ, revealed to her by the Blessed Virgin Mary during religious ecstasy.

During her bedridden years, a number of well-known contemporaries visited her. The poet Clemens Maria Brentano interviewed her at length and wrote several pages, based on his notes of her description of the visions. The authenticity of Brentano's writings has been questioned, and critics have characterized the books as "conscious elaborations by a poet". Writing in L'Osservatore Romano, Jose Saraiva Martins declared the writings attributed to her the "artistic fantasy of Brentano".

Pope John Paul II beatified Emmerich on 3 October 2004, highlighting her notable virtues and deep Catholic piety. The purported “House of the Virgin Mary” in Ephesus is piously associated with her name.

== Early life ==
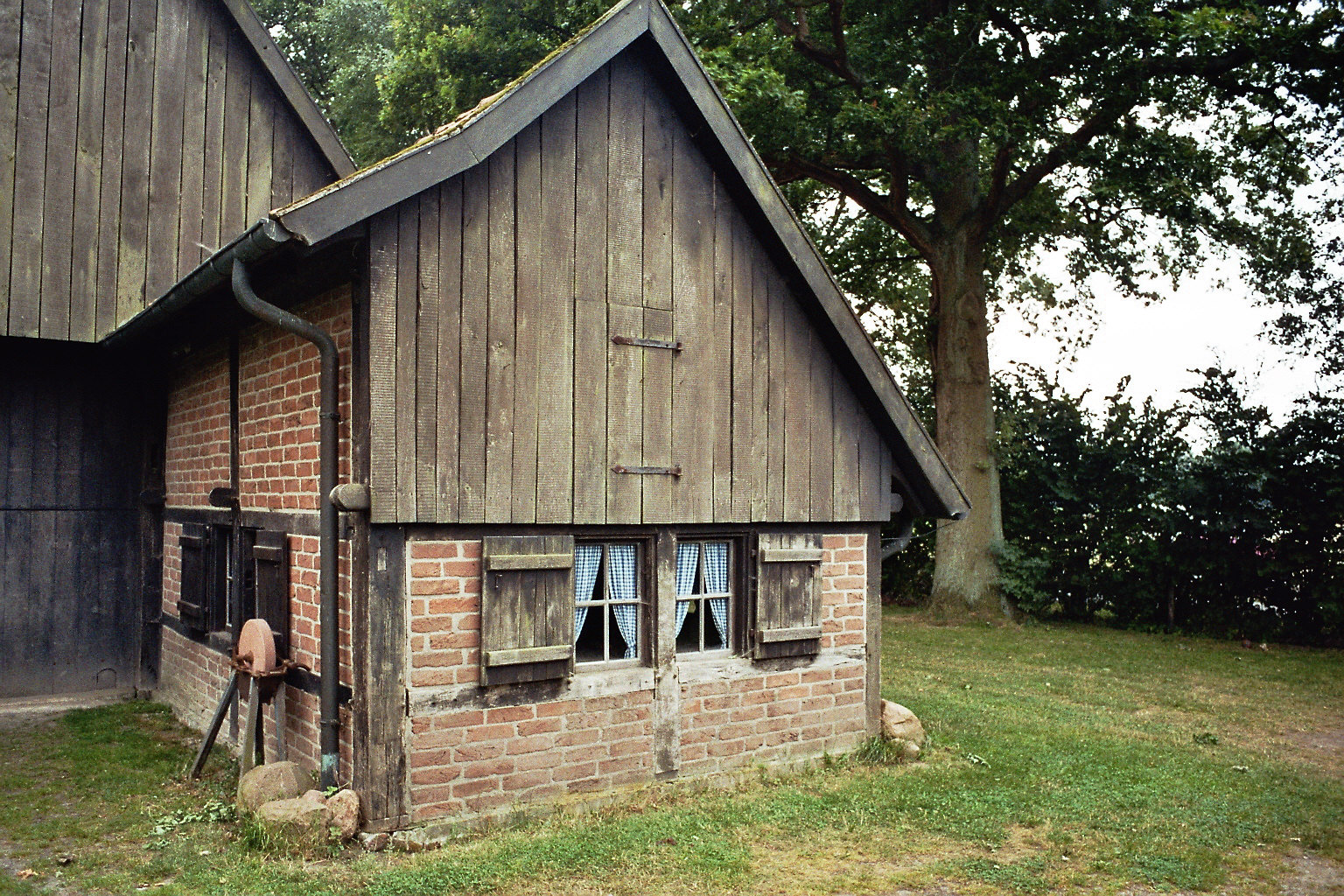
The preserved birth house of Anne Catherine Emmerich in Coesfeld-Flamschen.

Emmerich was born into a family of impoverished farmers and had nine brothers and sisters. The family's surname was derived from an ancestral town. From an early age, she helped with the house and farm work. Her schooling was rather brief, but all those who knew her noticed that she felt drawn to prayer from an early age. At twelve, she started to work at a large farm in the vicinity for three years and later learned to be a seamstress and worked as such for several years.

She applied for admission to various convents, but she was rejected because she could not afford a dowry. Eventually, the Order of Saint Clare in Münster agreed to accept her, provided she would learn to play the musical organ. She went to the organist Söntgen in Coesfeld to study music and learn to play the organ, but the poverty of the Söntgen family prompted her to sacrifice her small savings in an effort to help them. Later, one of the Söntgen daughters entered the convent with her.

== Religious life ==
In 1802, Emmerich (aged 28) and her friend Klara Söntgen were finally permitted to join the Augustinian nuns at the convent of Agnetenberg in Dülmen. The following year, Emmerich took her religious vows. In the convent, she became known for her strict observance of the order's rule; but, from the beginning to 1811, she was often quite ill and suffered great pain. At times, her zeal and strict adherence to the convent's rules disturbed some of the more tepid sisters, who were also puzzled by her weak health and religious ecstasies.

When the King of Westphalia, Jérôme Bonaparte suppressed the convent in 1812, all the nuns were forced to leave. She sought and found refuge in the house of a widow.

== Imposition of the Stigmata ==
In early 1813, marks of the stigmata were reported on Emmerich's body. The parish priest called in two doctors to examine her. When word of the phenomenon spread three months later, he notified the vicar general. With the news causing considerable talk in the town, the ecclesiastical authorities conducted a lengthy investigation. Many doctors wished to examine the case, and although efforts were made to discourage the curious, there were also visitors whose rank or status gained them entry. During this time, the poet and romanticist Clemens Brentano first visited Emmerich.

At the end of 1818, the periodic bleeding of Emmerich's hands and feet had stopped, and the wounds had closed. While many in the community viewed the stigmata as real, others claimed that Emmerich was an impostor and that she conspired with others to perpetrate her fraud. In August 1819, the civil authorities intervened and moved Emmerich to a different house, where she was kept under observation for three weeks. The members of the commission could find no evidence of fraud, yet her stigmata continued. The commission members thus became divided in their opinions.

The cross on her breastbone had the unusual shape of a "Y", similar to a cross in the local church of Coesfeld. The English priest Herbert Thurston surmised that "the subjective impressions of the stigmatic exercise a preponderating influence upon the manifestations which appear exteriorly" and suggested that this phenomenon is described in the works of the Augustinian Catholic priest, John of Ruusbroec. However, this supposition is purely conjectural.

== Purported apparitions ==
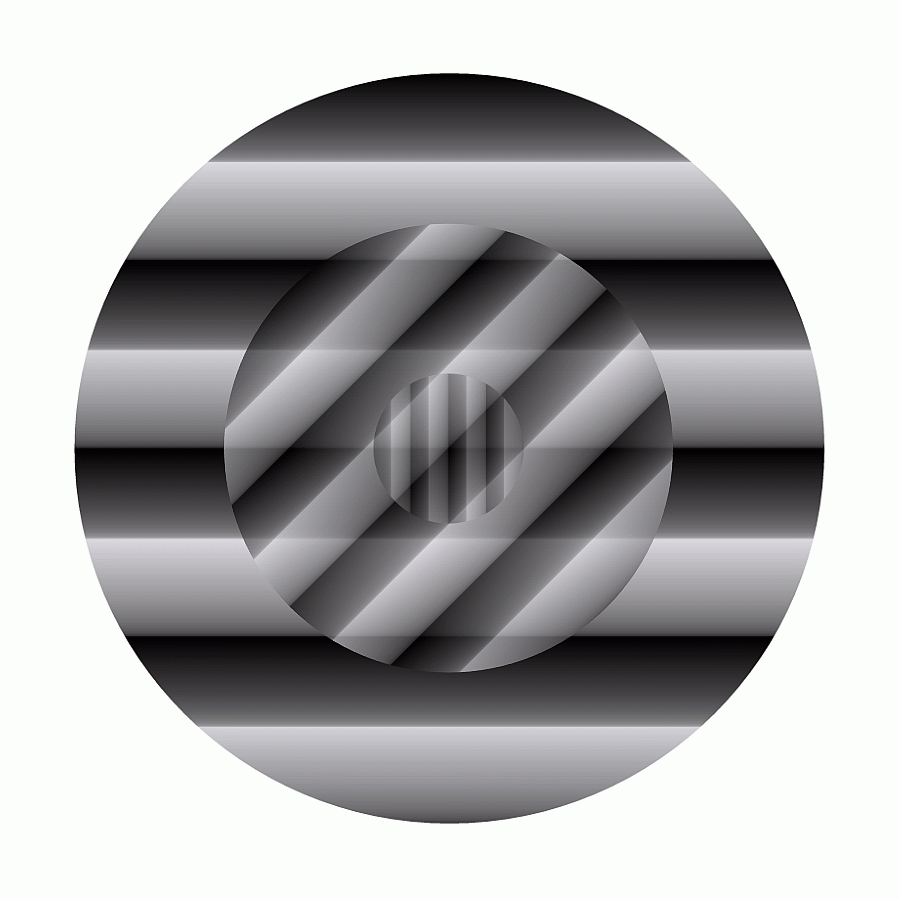
A nuclear image of the Blessed Trinity following the descriptions of Emmerich. The lines define different spectrums of light, unknown to color.

As a young child, Emmerich claimed to have visions in which she talked with Jesus and saw the Souls in Purgatory.

She further described the essence of the Holy Trinity in the form of three concentric, interpenetrating full spheres. The largest but dimmest of the spheres represented the Father core, the medium sphere the Son core, and the smallest and brightest sphere the Holy Spirit core. Each sphere of omnipresent God is extended toward infinity beyond God's core placed in heaven.

Brentano's writings also suggest that during an illness in Emmerich's childhood, she was visited by the Child Jesus, who told her of plants she should ingest in order to heal, including Morning Glory flower juice, which is known to contain ergine.

A number of figures who were influential in the renewal movement of the Church early in the 19th century came to visit Emmerich, among them Clemens August von Droste zu Vischering, the future Archbishop of Cologne; Johann Michael Sailer, the Bishop of Ratisbon, since 1803 the sole surviving Elector Spiritual of the Holy Roman Empire; Bernhard Overberg and authors Luise Hensel and Friedrich Stolberg. The former vicar—general of the Archdiocese, Clemens von Droste stated that Emmerich "a special friend of God" in a letter he wrote to Stolberg.

=== According to Clemens Maria Brentano ===
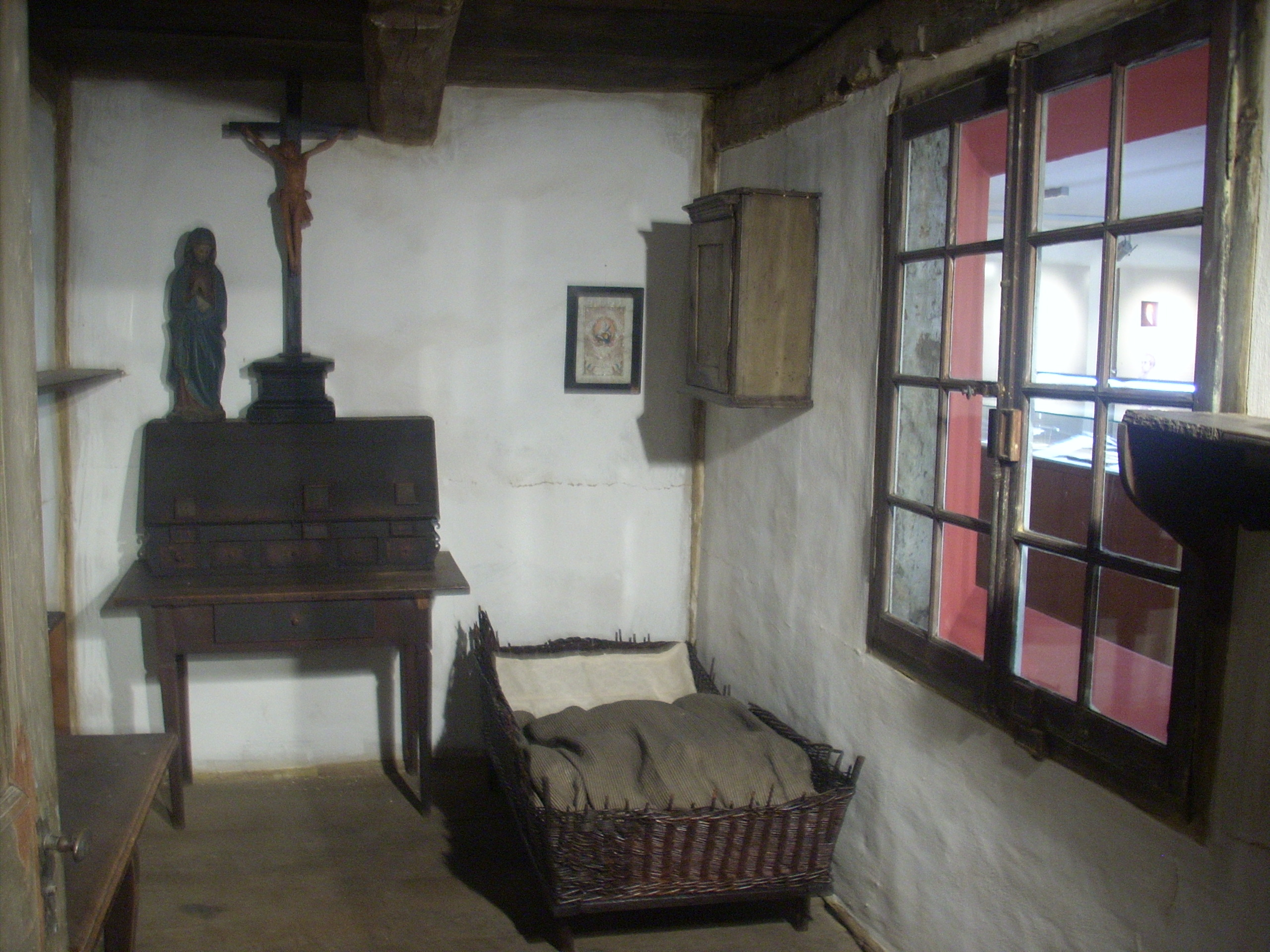
The reconstruction of Emmerich's room with the original furniture, at the Holy Cross church in Dülmen, Germany

At the time of Emmerich's second examination in 1819, Brentano visited her. He claimed that she told him he was sent to help her fulfill God's command, to express in writing the revelations she had received. Brentano became one of Emmerich's many supporters, believing her to be a "chosen Bride of Christ".

Professor Andrew Weeks claims that Brentano's own personal complexes were a factor in substituting Emmerich as a maternal figure in his own life.

From 1819 until Emmerich's death in 1824, Brentano filled many notebooks with accounts of her visions, including scenes from the New Testament and the life of the Virgin Mary. Because Emmerich only spoke the Westphalian dialect, Brentano could not transcribe her words directly, and often could not even take notes in her presence. So he would quickly write notes in standard German when he returned to his own apartment, based on what he remembered of the conversations he had with Emmerich. Brentano edited the notes later, years after the death of Emmerich.

About ten years after Emmerich had recounted her visions, Brentano completed editing his records for publication. In 1833, he published his first volume, The Dolorous Passion of Our Lord Jesus Christ According to the Meditations of Anne Catherine Emmerich. Brentano then prepared The Life of the Blessed Virgin Mary from the Visions of Anna Catherine Emmerich for publication, but he died in 1842. The book was published posthumously in 1852 in Munich.

Catholic priest Karl Schmoger edited Brentano's manuscripts, and from 1858 to 1860, he published the three volumes of The Life of Our Lord. In 1881, a large illustrated edition was published. Schmoger also penned a biography of Anne Catherine Emmerich in two volumes from 1867 to 1870. It has since been republished in English language editions.

The Vatican does not endorse the authenticity of the books written by Brentano. However, it has declared the general message of these books as "an outstanding proclamation of the gospel in service to salvation". Other critics have been less sympathetic, characterizing his books as the "conscious elaborations of an overwrought romantic poet".

Some argue that these writings indicate racist beliefs and contain a "clear antisemitic strain throughout." For example, Noah's son Ham is portrayed as the progenitor of "the black, idolatrous, stupid nations" of the world. Also, in the "Dolorous Passion", it is implied that "Jews [...] strangled Christian children and used their blood for all sorts of suspicious and diabolical practices".

=== Claims of forgery ===
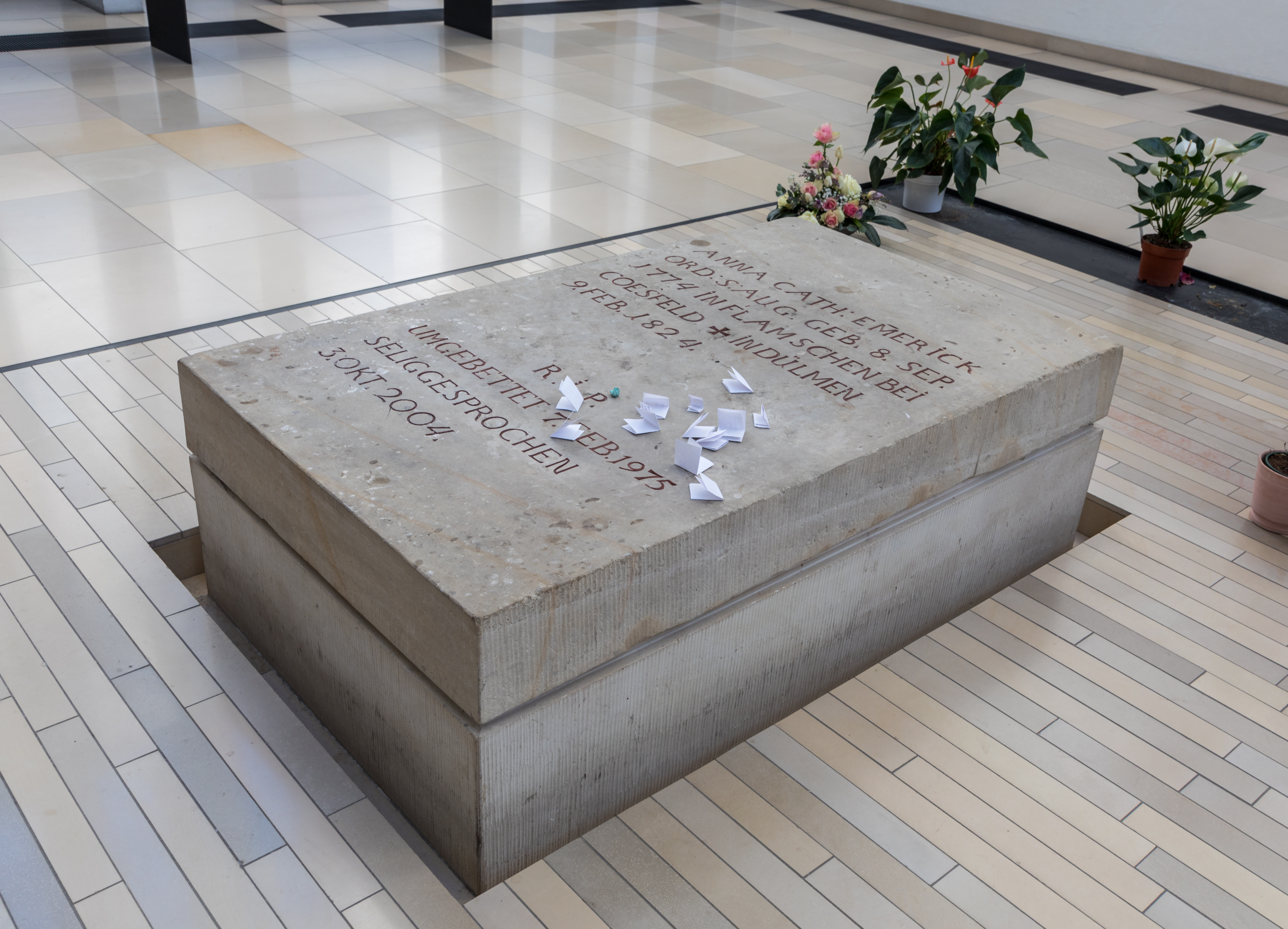
The tomb of Anne Catherine at the Church of the Most Holy Cross in Dülmen, Germany.

When the case for Emmerich's beatification was submitted to the Vatican in 1892, a number of experts in Germany began to compare and analyze Brentano's original notes from his personal library with the books he had written. The analysis revealed various apocryphal biblical sources, maps, and travel guides among his papers. These could have been used to exaggerate or embellish some of Emmerich's narrations.

In 1923, the German Catholic priest Winfried Hümpfner, who had compared Brentano's original notes to the published books, wrote in his theological thesis that Brentano had fabricated much of the material he had attributed to Emmerich. By 1928, the experts had come to the conclusion that only a small portion of Brentano's books could be safely attributed to Emmerich.

At the time of Emmerich's beatification in 2004, the Vatican's position on the authenticity of the Brentano books was elucidated by priest Peter Gumpel, who was involved in the study of the issues for the Congregation for the Causes of the Saints: "It is absolutely not certain that she ever wrote this. There is a serious problem of authenticity." According to Gumpel, the writings attributed to Emmerich were "absolutely discarded" by the Vatican as part of her beatification process. Jose Saraiva Martins, who at the time of the beatification of Emmerich was the prefect of the Congregation for the Causes of Saints declared the writings attributed to her the "artistic fantasy of Brentano" and stated that they played no role in her beatification.

== Death and burial ==
Emmerich began to grow weaker during the summer of 1823. She died on 9 February 1824 in Dülmen and was buried in the graveyard outside the town, with a large number of people attending her funeral. Her grave was reopened twice in the weeks following the funeral, due to a false rumor that her body had been desecrated and stolen, but the coffin and the body were found to be intact.

In February 1975, Emmerich's mortal remains were permanently moved to the Church of the Holy Cross in Dülmen. Due to the cult of piety established after her death, most especially amongst Traditionalist Catholics, slips of paper with thanksgiving or personal intentions are collected at her tombstone and burned annually on Easter Sunday.

== The House of the Virgin Mary ==
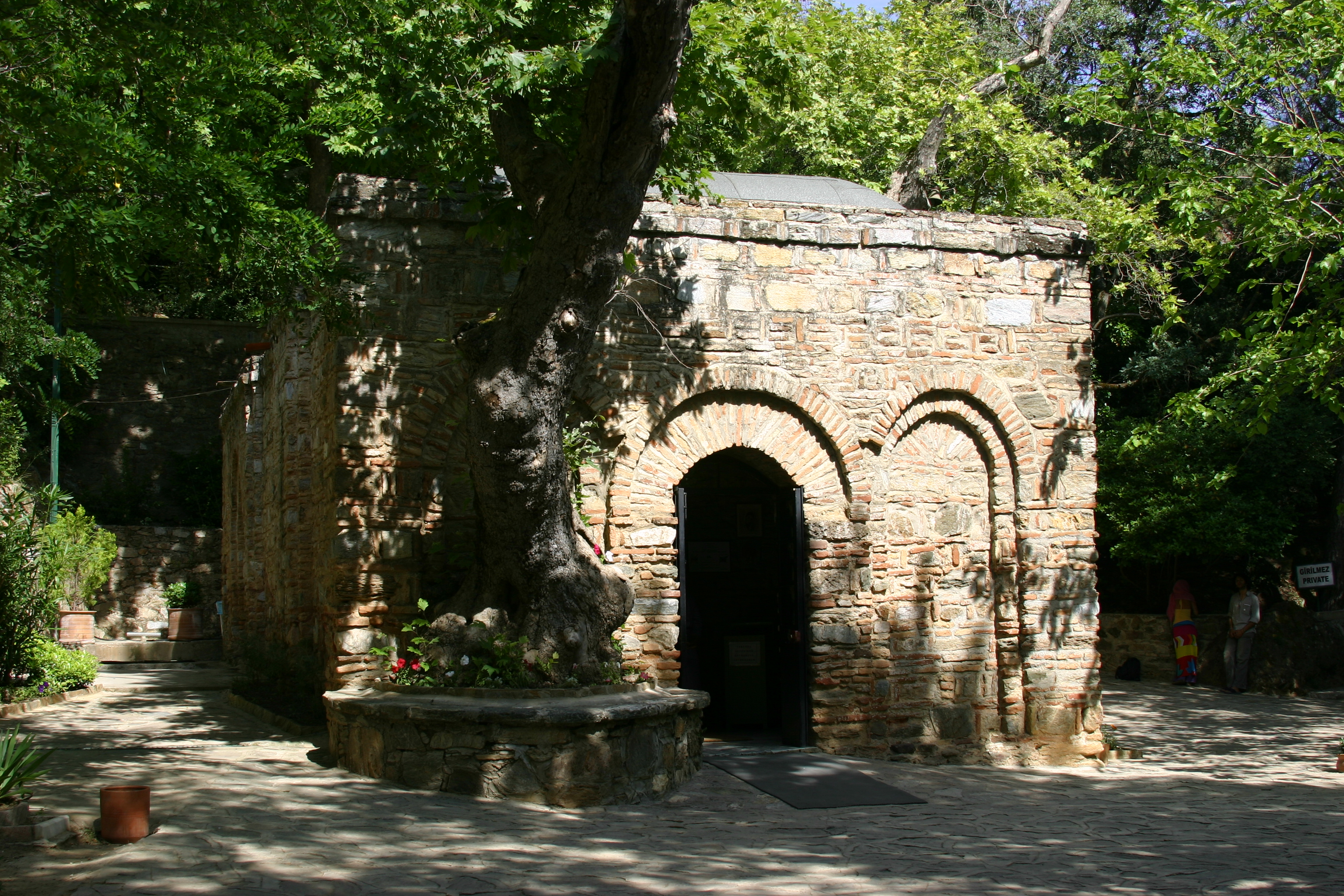
House of the Virgin Mary, now a chapel in Ephesus, Turkey

Neither Brentano nor Emmerich had ever been to Ephesus, and indeed the city had not yet been excavated; but visions contained in The Life of The Blessed Virgin Mary were used during the discovery of the House of the Virgin Mary, the Blessed Virgin's supposed home before her Assumption, located on a hill near Ephesus, as described in the book Mary's House.

Emmerich described Mary's house:

The Blessed Virgin's dwelling was not in Ephesus itself, but from three to four hours distant. It stood on a height upon which several Christians from Judea, among them some of the holy women related to her, had taken up their abode. Between this height and Ephesus glided, with many a crooked curve, a little river. The height sloped obliquely toward Ephesus

In 1881, a French Catholic priest, Julien Gouyet, used Emmerich's book to search for the house in Ephesus and found it based on the descriptions. He was not taken seriously at first, but Sister Marie de Mandat-Grancey persisted until two other priests followed the same path and confirmed the finding.

== Pontifical approbations ==
Pope Leo XIII visited the shrine in 1896. Pope Pius X granted a plenary indulgence to the pilgrimage to the shrine in 1914 and sent his blessing to "the valiant searchers for the tomb of the Most Blessed Virgin." Pope Pius XII initially declared the house a "Holy Place" (1951). As former Apostolic Nuncio to Turkey, Cardinal Angelo Roncalli visited the shrine (1935), and later as Pope John XXIII made the Pian declaration permanent. (Note: Pope Benedict XVI clarified that Pope John XXIII did not visit as Pontiff.) Pope Paul VI (1967), Pope John Paul II (1979) and Pope Benedict XVI (2006) visited the house and current shrine.

== Beatification ==
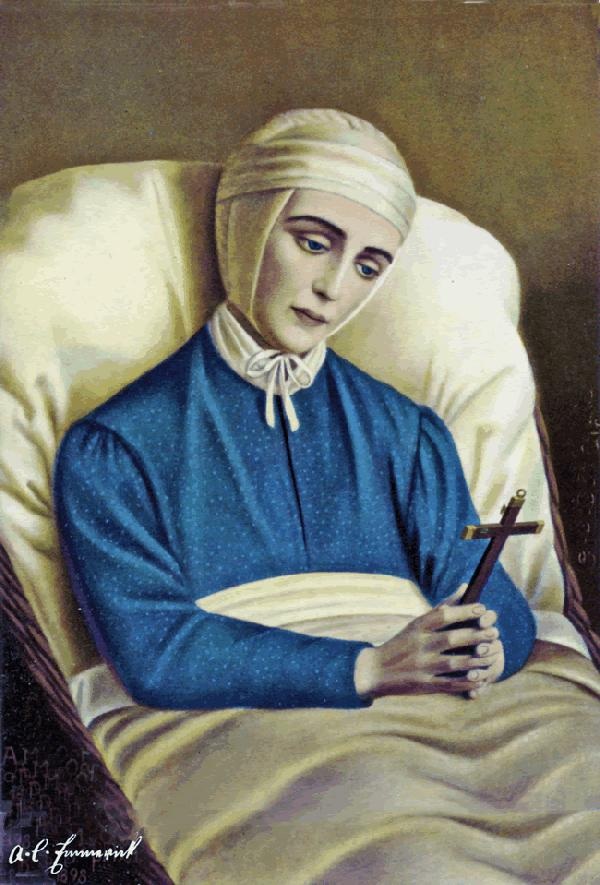
An artistic depiction of Emmerich from 1895.

Pope John Paul II on 3 October 2004 declared the following:

Her example opened the hearts of poor and rich alike, of simple and cultured persons, whom she instructed in loving dedication to Jesus Christ. —Homily, Sunday, 3 October 2004.

The process of Emmerich's beatification was started in 1892 by the Bishop of Münster, and her cause was officially opened by the Vatican on 12 June 1899. The process of evaluating the spiritual writings began on 22 April 1901. In 1928, however, the Vatican suspended the process when it was suspected that Clemens Brentano had fabricated some of the material that appeared in the books he wrote and which he had attributed to Emmerich.

In 1973, the Congregation for the Causes of the Saints allowed the case for her beatification to be re-opened, provided it only focused on the issue of her life, without any reference to the possibly doctored material produced by Clemens Brentano.

In July 2003, the Congregation for the Causes of the Saints promulgated a decree for a miracle attributed to her, and that paved the way for her beatification.

On 3 October 2004, Anne Catherine Emmerich was beatified by Pope John Paul II. However, the books produced by Brentano were set aside, and her cause adjudicated solely on the basis of her own personal sanctity and virtue. Peter Gumpel, who was involved in the analysis of the matter at the Vatican, told Catholic News Service:

Since it was impossible to distinguish what derives from Sister Emmerich and what is embroidery or additions, we could not take these writings as a criterion [in the decision on beatification]. Therefore, they were simply discarded completely from all the work for the cause.

== In film ==
In 2003, Hollywood actor and director Mel Gibson used Brentano's book The Dolorous Passion as a key source for his 2004 film The Passion of the Christ. Gibson stated that Scripture and "accepted visions" were the only sources he drew on, and a careful reading of Brentano's book shows the film's high level of dependence on it.

In 2007, the German director Dominik Graf made the movie The Pledge as a dramatization of the encounters between Emmerich (portrayed by actress Tanja Schleiff) and Clemens Brentano, based on a novel by Kai Meyer.

== Bibliography ==
=== Original publications in the German language ===
- Emmerich, Anna Catherine. The Dolorous Passion of Our Lord Jesus Christ (1833) - Edited by Clemens Brentano, who recorded Emmerich's visions and narrations.
- Emmerich, Anna Catherine. The Life of the Blessed Virgin Mary (1852) - Edited by Clemens Brentano, who recorded Emmerich's visions and narrations. Posthumous release for Clemens Brentano.
- Emmerich, Anna Catherine. The Life of Our Lord and Savior Jesus Christ (1858–1860) - Edited and compiled by Carl E. Schmöger, based on Emmerich's visions and narrations recorded by Clemens Brentano.
- Schmöger, K. E. The Life of the Blessed Anna Katharina Emmerich Vol.I (1867) - Edited and written by Carl E. Schmöger, based on Emmerich's life and visions recorded by Clemens Brentano.
- Schmöger, K. E. The Life of the Blessed Anna Katharina Emmerich Vol.II (1870) - Edited and written by Carl E. Schmöger, based on Emmerich's life and visions recorded by Clemens Brentano.

=== English editions of Emmerich's visions ===
- Emmerich, Anna Catherine. The Nativity of our Lord Jesus Christ, Burns & Oates, 1899.
- Emmerich, Anna Catherine. Pray the Rosary with Blessed Anne Catherine Emmerich. Edited by Scott L. Smith Jr., Holy Water Books, 2022.
- Emmerich, Anna Catherine. The Lowly Life and Bitter Passion of Our Lord Jesus Christ and His Blessed Mother, Sentinel, 1915 [third volume only].
- Emmerich, Anna Catherine. The Dolorous Passion of Our Lord Jesus Christ. Charlotte, NC: TAN Books, 2009. ISBN 978-0-89555-210-5
- Emmerich, Anna Catherine. The Life of the Blessed Virgin Mary: From the Visions of Anna Catherine Emmerich: Charlotte, NC: TAN Books, 2009. ISBN 978-0-89555-048-4
- Emmerich, Anna Catherine. Life of Jesus Christ and Biblical Revelations. Charlotte, NC: TAN Books, 2008. ISBN 978-0-89555-791-9
- Emmerich, Anna Catherine. The Bitter Passion and the Life of Mary: From the Visions of Anna Catherine Emmerich: As Recorded in the Journals of Clemens Brentano. Fresno, California: Academy Library Guild, 1954.

=== Literature ===
- Corcoran, Rev. Mgr. "Anne Katherina Emmerich," The American Catholic Quarterly Review, Vol. X, 1885.
- Frederickson, Paula. ed. On the Passion of the Christ. Los Angeles: University of California Press, 2006.
- Kathleen Corley and Robert Webb. ed. Jesus and Mel Gibson's Passion of the Christ. The Film, the Gospel and the Claims of History. London: Continuum, 2004. ISBN 0-8264-7781-X
- Ram, Helen. The Life of Anne Catharine Emmerich, Burns and Oates, 1874.
- Schmoger, Karl. Life of Anna Katherina Emmerich. Rockford, Illinois: Tan Books and Publications, 1974. ISBN 0-89555-061-X (set); ISBN 0-89555-059-8 (volume 1); ISBN 0-89555-060-1 (volume 2)
- Wegener, Thomas. Life of Sister Anna Katherina Emmerich: New York: Benziger Brothers: 1898.

== See also ==
- Alexandrina of Balazar
- Faustina Kowalska
- Maria Domenica Lazzeri
- Maria Valtorta
- Marie Rose Ferron
- Marthe Robin
