= 7th-century Byzantine domes =

The period of Iconoclasm, roughly corresponding to the 7th to 9th centuries, is poorly documented but can be considered a transitional period. The "cross-domed basilica" type, churches with a cross-shaped nave and short cross arms, does not appear to have existed before the 7th century and is associated with the 7th to the 9th centuries.

== The Balkans ==
The cathedral of Sofia has an unsettled date of construction, ranging from the last years of Justinian to the middle of the 7th century, as the Balkans were lost to the Slavs and Bulgars. It combines a barrel-vaulted cruciform basilica plan with a crossing dome hidden externally by the drum. It resembles some Romanesque churches of later centuries, although the type would not be popular in later Byzantine architecture. Other proposed dates range from the second half of the 5th century to the second half of the 9th century.

== Turkey ==
Destruction by earthquakes or invaders in the seventh to ninth centuries seems to have encouraged the development of masonry domes and vaulting experimentation over basilicas in Anatolia. The Sivrihisar Kizil Kilise has a dome over an octagonal drum with windows on a square platform and was built around 600, before the battles in the region in the 640s. The domed Church of Mary in Ephesus may have been built in the late sixth or first half of the seventh century with reused bricks. The smaller Church of the Dormition of the Monastery of Hyacinth in Nicaea had a dome supported on four narrow arches and dated prior to 727. The lobed dome of the Church of St. Clement at Ancyra was supported by pendentives that also included squinch-like arches, a possible indication of unfamiliarity with pendentives by the builders. The upper portion of the Church of St. Nicholas at Myra was destroyed, but it had a dome on pendentives over the nave that might have been built between 602 and 655, although it has been attributed to the late eighth or early ninth centuries. The dome over the Dormition church in Nicaea was damaged by an earthquake in 1063 and had to be rebuilt.

A small church within the Episcopal Palace in Side has been dated to the 5th and 6th centuries, but a monogram in the templon architrave and stylistic details indicate it was built in the second half of the 7th century and is an example of a transitional or prototype cross-in-square church. Its 3.24 meter dome is 0.10 meters wider than the dome of an archaic cross-in-square church at the site dated to the 7th and 8th centuries.

== Italy ==
The Church of Santa Maria di Gallana in Agro di Oria was built sometime between 668 and the 9th century.

The Daphne baths in Syracuse, Sicily, had a dome built with ceramic vaulting tubes that has been tentatively dated to the 7th century.

== See also ==
- List of Roman domes
- History of architecture
