= House of the Virgin Mary =

Abrahamic shrine near Selçuk, Turkey

- Meryemana Evi
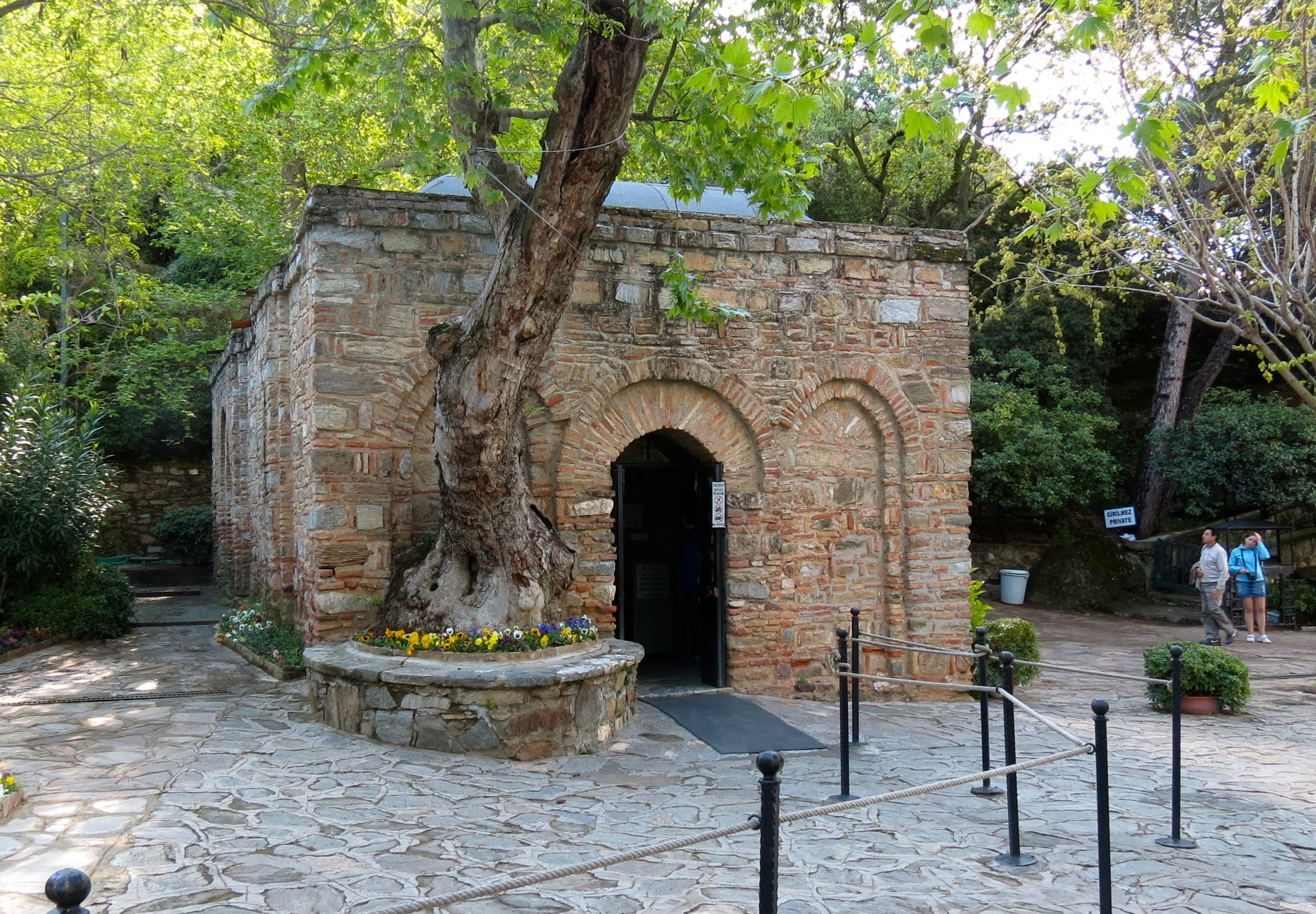
- The exterior view of the restored house, now serving as a chapel.

- Location within Turkey Location within Europe
- 37°54′42″N 27°20′03″E
- Location: Selçuk, İzmir Province, Turkey
- Region: Selçuk

Site notes
- Website: Ephesos Archaeological Site

The House of the Virgin Mary (Turkish: Meryemana Evi or Meryem Ana Evi, "Mother Mary's House") is a Catholic shrine located on Mt. Koressos (Turkish: Bülbüldağı, "Mount Nightingale") in the vicinity of Ephesus, 7 kilometres (4.3 mi) from Selçuk in Turkey.

The house was discovered in the 19th century by following the descriptions in the reported visions of Blessed Anne Catherine Emmerich (1774–1824), a Roman Catholic nun and visionary, which were published as a book by Clemens Brentano after her death. While the Catholic Church has never pronounced in favour or against the authenticity of the house, the site has nevertheless received a steady flow of pilgrimage since its discovery. Anne Catherine Emmerich was beatified by Pope John Paul II on October 3, 2004.

Christian and Muslim pilgrims visit the house based on the belief that Mary, the mother of Jesus, was taken to this stone house by Saint John and lived there for the remainder of her earthly life.

During the drafting of the Second Vatican Council document Nostra Aetate, Maronite Catholic Archbishop Pietro Sfair highlighted the House of Mary and Marian devotion as a matter of shared interest between Christians and Muslims.

Archbishop P. Sfair of the Maronite Rite (Rome) considered the reference which the declaration De non christianis made to the Muslims' adoration of the one and remunerating God as insufficient. Mention should also be made of Mohammed's affirmation of the virginal conception and birth of Christ through Mary, the most exalted among women. The Archbishop recalled the respect with which the earliest Muslims treated the Christians and the Christian beliefs. He insisted that the declaration should give greater consideration to that which the Muslims believed, to the truths which they proposed for belief, than to their less essential cultural factors.

The shrine has merited several papal Apostolic Blessings and visits from several popes including Paul VI, John Paul II, and Benedict XVI.

== Description of the site ==
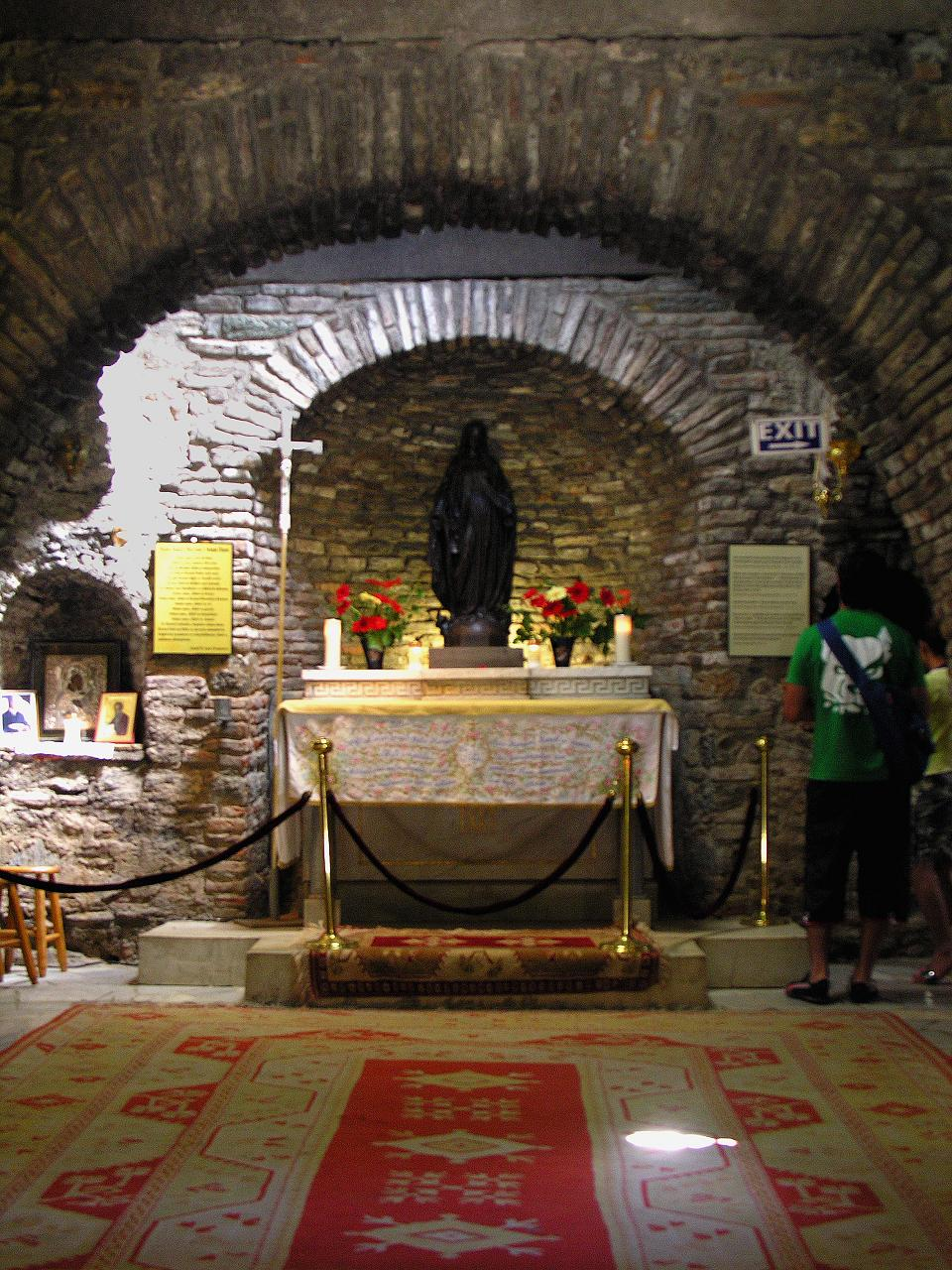
The Interior of the house.

On the way to the shrine, visitors pass a key hole-shaped baptismal pool, larger than the one located at the basilica in Ephesus. It is thought that an early community of Christians may have lived or were baptized here in seclusion in order to escape the nearby Romans.

The shrine itself is not extensively large, but may rather be described as a modest chapel. The preserved stones and construction date back into the Apostolic Age, as consistent with other preserved buildings from that time, but with minor additions such as garden landscapes and devotional additions outside the shrine. Upon entrance to the chapel, a pilgrim is met by one single large room where an altar along with a large statue of the Blessed Virgin Mary is prominently displayed in the center.

On the right side, a smaller room lies – traditionally associated with the actual room where the Virgin Mary is believed to have slept. Marian tradition holds that some form of running water used to flow like a canal in the smaller room where the Virgin Mary slept and rested, leading to the present drinking fountain outside the building structure.

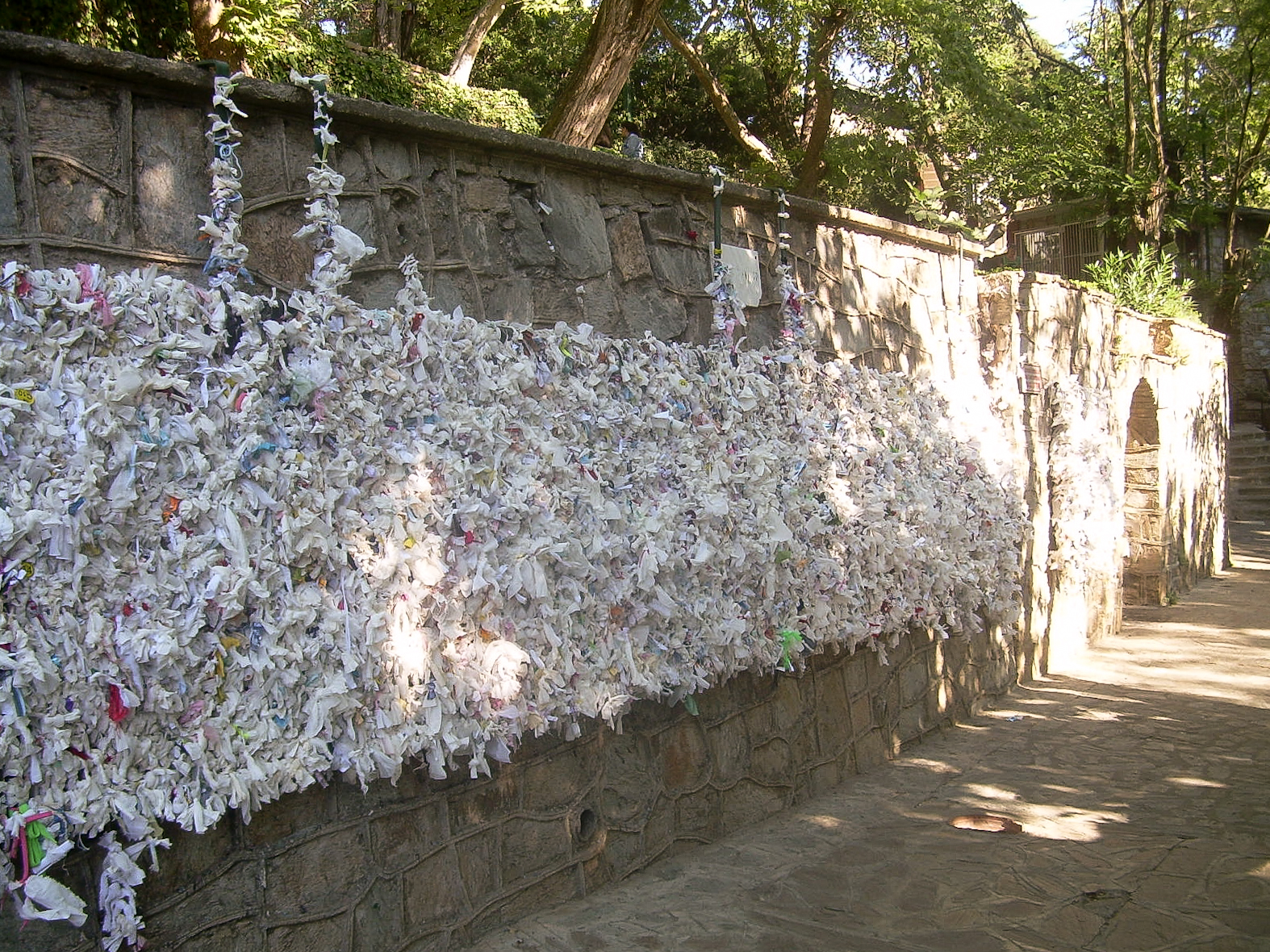
Meryemana, the wishing wall

== Wishing Wall ==
Outside the shrine is a particular "wishing wall" which pilgrims have used by tying their personal intentions on paper or fabric. Various types of florals and fruits are grown nearby, and additional lighting has been installed within the vicinity of the shrine for further monitoring of the site. A water fountain or well is also located nearby, believed by some pilgrims to have miraculous powers of healing or fertility.

== Description in Germany ==
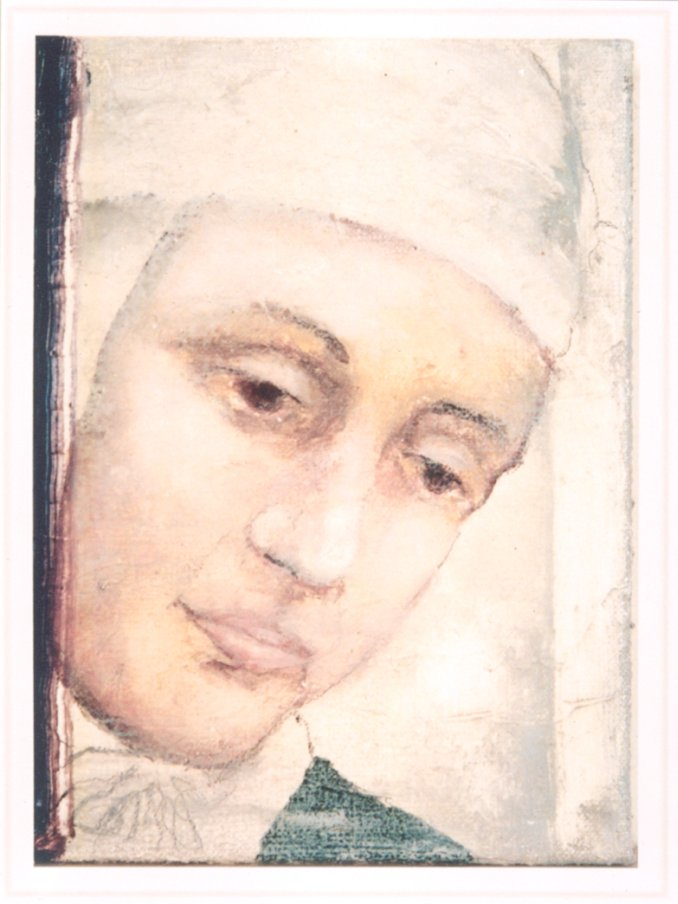
An 18th-century drawing of Anne Catherine Emmerich

At the beginning of the 19th century, Anne Catherine Emmerich, a bedridden Augustinian nun in Germany, reported a series of visions in which she recounted the last days of the life of Jesus, and details of the life of Mary, his mother. Emmerich was ill for a long period of time in the farming community of Dülmen but was known in Germany as a mystic and was visited by a number of notable figures.

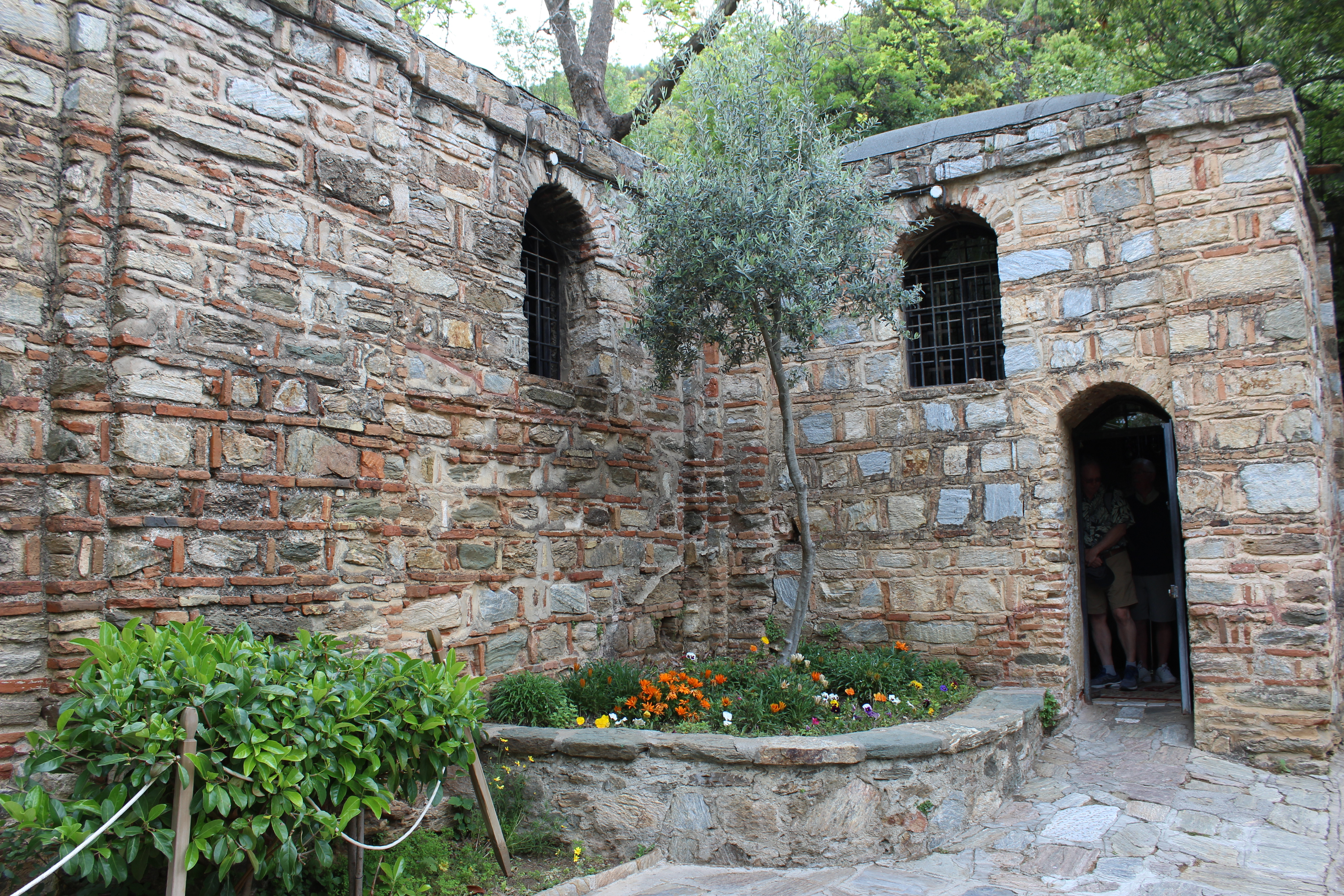
Another angle of the house's exterior.

One of Emmerich's accounts was a description of the house the Apostle John had built in Ephesus for Mary, the mother of Jesus, where she had lived to the end of her life. Emmerich provided a number of details about the location of the house, and the topography of the surrounding area:

Mary did not live in Ephesus itself, but in the country near it. ... Mary's dwelling was on a hill to the left of the road from Jerusalem, some three and half hours from Ephesus. This hill slopes steeply towards Ephesus; the city, as one approaches it from the south east seems to lie on rising ground.... Narrow paths lead southwards to a hill near the top of which is an uneven plateau, some half hour's journey.

One of Emmerich's visitors was the author Clemens Brentano who after a first visit stayed in Dülmen for five years to see Emmerich every day and transcribe the visions she reported. After Emmerich's death, Brentano published a book based on his transcriptions of her reported visions in 1852 in Munich, Germany. A second book was published based on his notes after his own death. When the case for Emmerich's beatification was submitted to the Vatican in 1892, a number of experts in Germany began to compare and analyze Brentano's original notes from his personal library with the books he had written. The analysis revealed various apocryphal biblical sources, maps and travel guides among his papers, which could have been used to enhance Emmerich's narrations.

== Discovery in Turkey ==
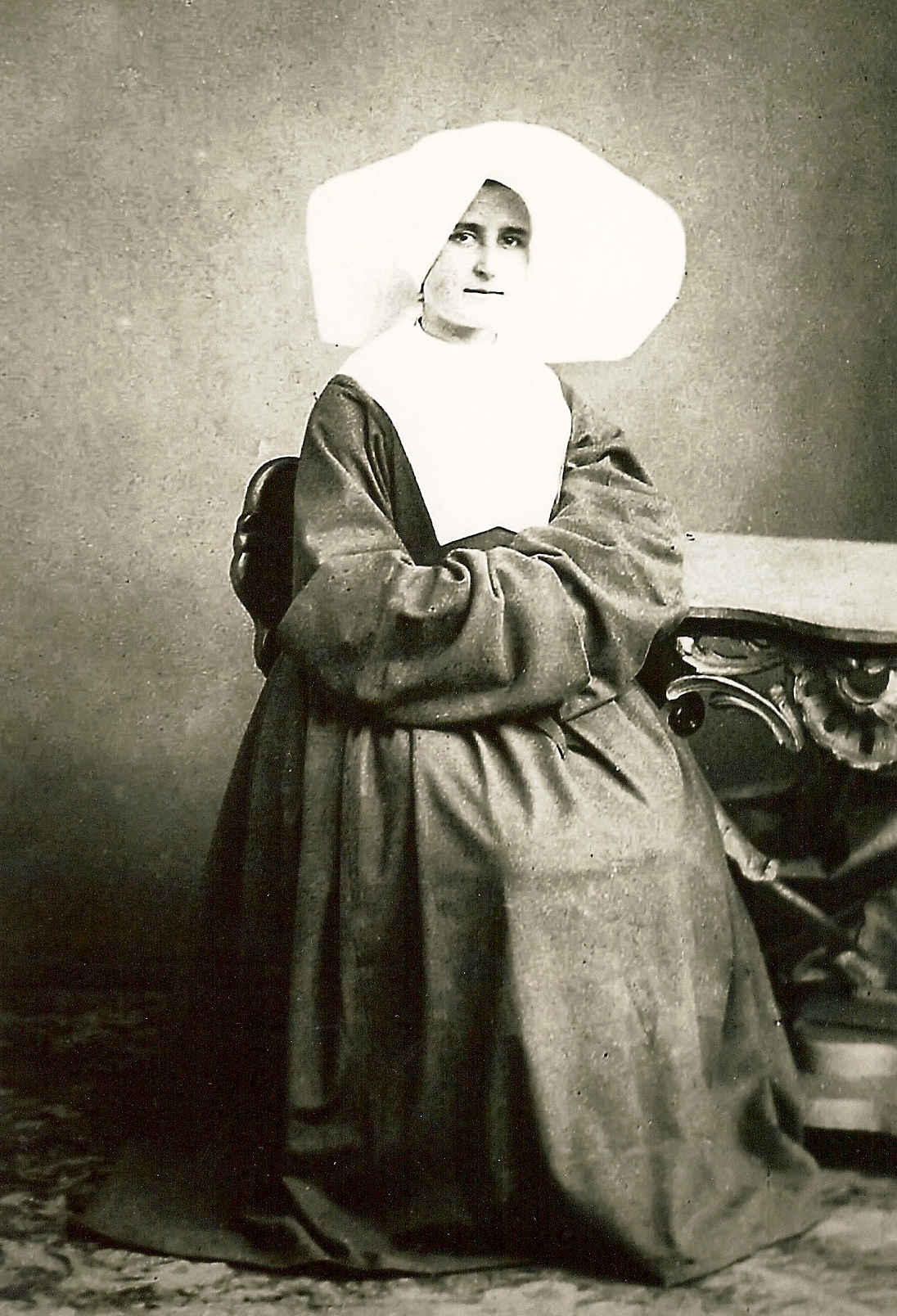
Sister Marie de Mandat-Grancey

On October 18, 1881, relying on the descriptions in the book by Brentano based on his conversations with Emmerich, a French priest, the Abbé Julien Gouyet discovered a small stone building on a mountain overlooking the Aegean Sea and the ruins of ancient Ephesus in Turkey. He believed it was the house described by Emmerich and where the Virgin Mary had lived the final years of her life.

Abbé Gouyet's discovery was not taken seriously by most people, but ten years later, urged by Sister Marie de Mandat-Grancey, DC, two Lazarist missionaries, Father Poulin and Father Jung, from Smyrna rediscovered the building on July 29, 1891, using the same source for a guide. They learned that the four-walled, roofless ruin had been venerated for a long time by members of the mountain village of Şirince, 17 km (11 mi) distant, who were descended from the early Christians of Ephesus. The house is called Panaya Kapulu ("Doorway to the Virgin"). Every year pilgrims made a pilgrimage to the site on August 15, the date on which most of the Christian world celebrated Mary's Dormition/Assumption.

Sister Marie de Mandat-Grancey was named Foundress of Mary's House by the Catholic Church and was responsible for acquiring, restoring and preserving Mary's House and surrounding areas of the mountain from 1891 until her death in 1915. The discovery revived and strengthened a Christian tradition dating from the 12th century, 'the tradition of Ephesus', which has competed with the older 'Jerusalem tradition' about the place of the Dormition of the Mother of God. Due to the actions of Pope Leo XIII in 1896 and Pope John XXIII in 1961, the Catholic Church first removed plenary indulgences from the Church of the Dormition in Jerusalem and then bestowed them for all time to pilgrims to Mary's House in Ephesus.

== Archaeology ==
The restored portion of the structure has been distinguished from the original remains of the structure by a line painted in red. Some have expressed doubt about the site, as the tradition of Mary's association with Ephesus "arose only in the twelfth century." Supporters base their belief on the presence of the 5th century Church of Mary.

== Gospel and patristic authors ==
Saint Epiphanius of Salamis in the fourth century was the first author in mentioning the traditional faith of the Assumption of Mary in body and soul to Heaven, and coming from Ephesus.

Like many other patristic authors, he based this assumption on John 19,18-30, with Jesus on the Cross asking to the Apostle and Evangelist to take care of the Saint Mother of God into his home. "However, the evidence that St. Mary actually stayed there is not very strong, and there are much better indications that her permanent house was in Jerusalem."

== Position of the Roman Catholic Church ==
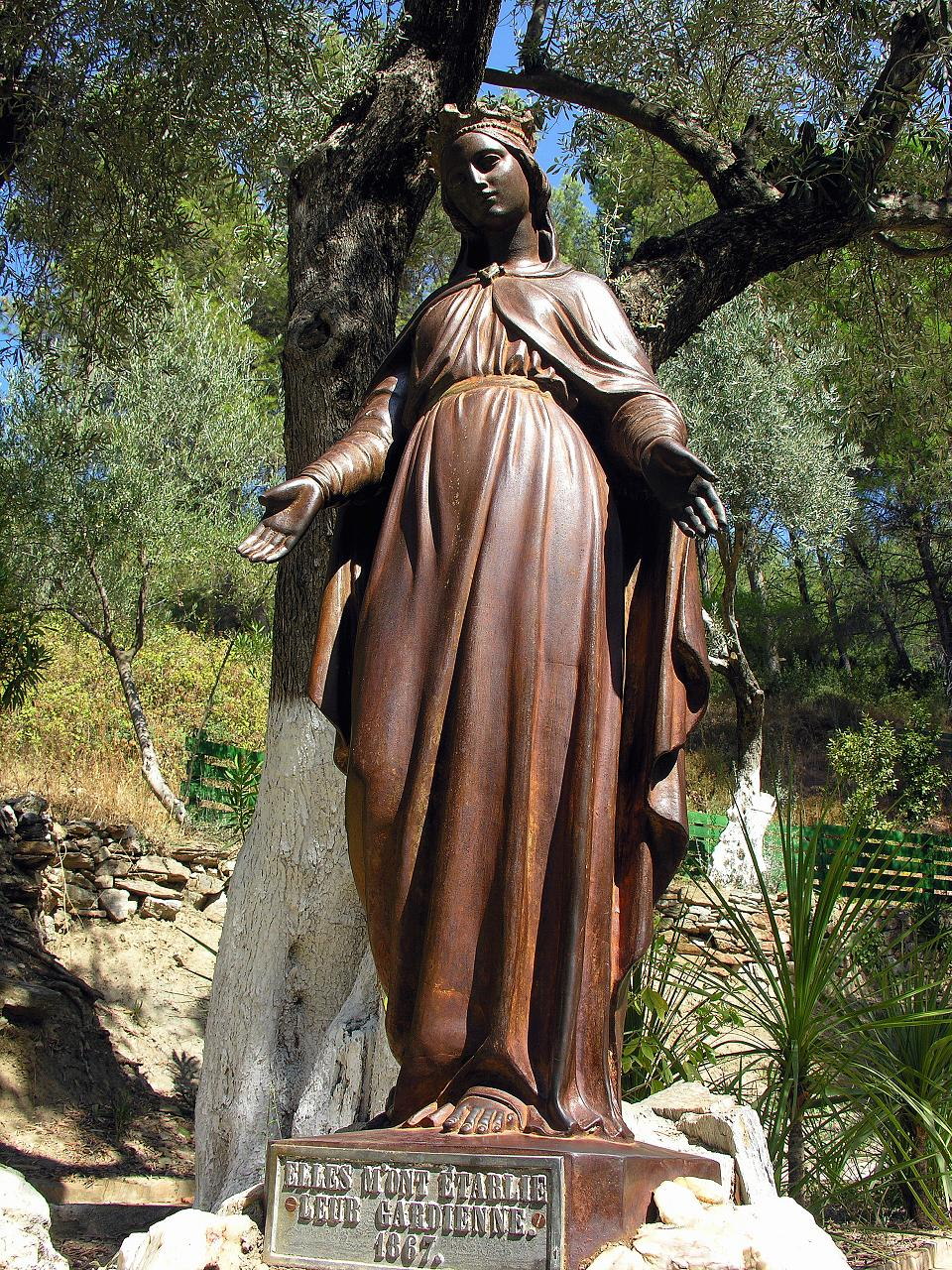
Statue of the Blessed Virgin Mary in her house exterior.

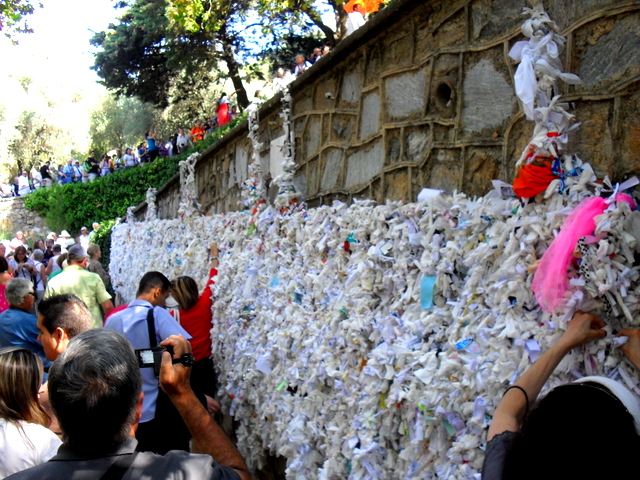
Wishes papers in House of Virgin Mary

The Roman Catholic Church has never pronounced on the authenticity of the house, for lack of scientifically acceptable evidence. It has, however, from the blessing of the first pilgrimage by Pope Leo XIII in 1896, taken a positive attitude towards the site. Pope Pius XII, in 1951, following the definition of the dogma of the Assumption in 1950, elevated the house to the status of a Holy Place, a privilege later made permanent by Pope John XXIII. The site is visited and venerated by Muslims as well as Christians. A liturgical ceremony is held here every year on August 15 to commemorate the Assumption of Mary.

=== Papal visits ===
Pope Paul VI visited the shrine on July 26, 1967, and Pope John Paul II on November 30, 1979. Pope Benedict XVI visited this shrine on November 29, 2006, during his four-day pastoral trip to Turkey.

== Restoration and maintenance of the site in modern times ==
The American Society of Ephesus (George B.Quatman Foundation), a non-profit, private foundation and 501(c)(3) corporation, in continuous existence since 1955, is actively engaged in restoring and maintaining ancient Christian sites in or near Ephesus, Turkey, including the House of Mary.

== Replicas around the world ==
There are replicas of the House of the Virgin Mary in (a) Jamaica, Vermont, USA, (b) Eindhoven, the Netherlands, (c) Buenos Aires, Argentina, (d) Natividade, Rio de Janeiro, Brazil, and (e) Medjugorje, Bosnia-Hertzegovina.

== See also ==
- Church of Mary
- Mary in Islam
- Mary's Tomb
- Loreto shrine

== Bibliography ==
- Mary's House by Donald Carroll (April 20, 2000) Veritas, ISBN 0-9538188-0-2
- Our Lady of Ephesus by Bernard F. Deutsch (February 22, 2024) Angelico Press, ISBN 979-8892800037. This Angelico Press edition is a reprint of the work originally published in 1965 by The Bruce Publishing Company.
