= Flamschen =

Coordinates: 51°55′21″N 7°08′50″E

Flamschen Flamske
- Farming community
- Interactive map of Flamschen
- Country: Germany
- State: North Rhine-Westphalia
- Region: Münster
- District: Coesfeld

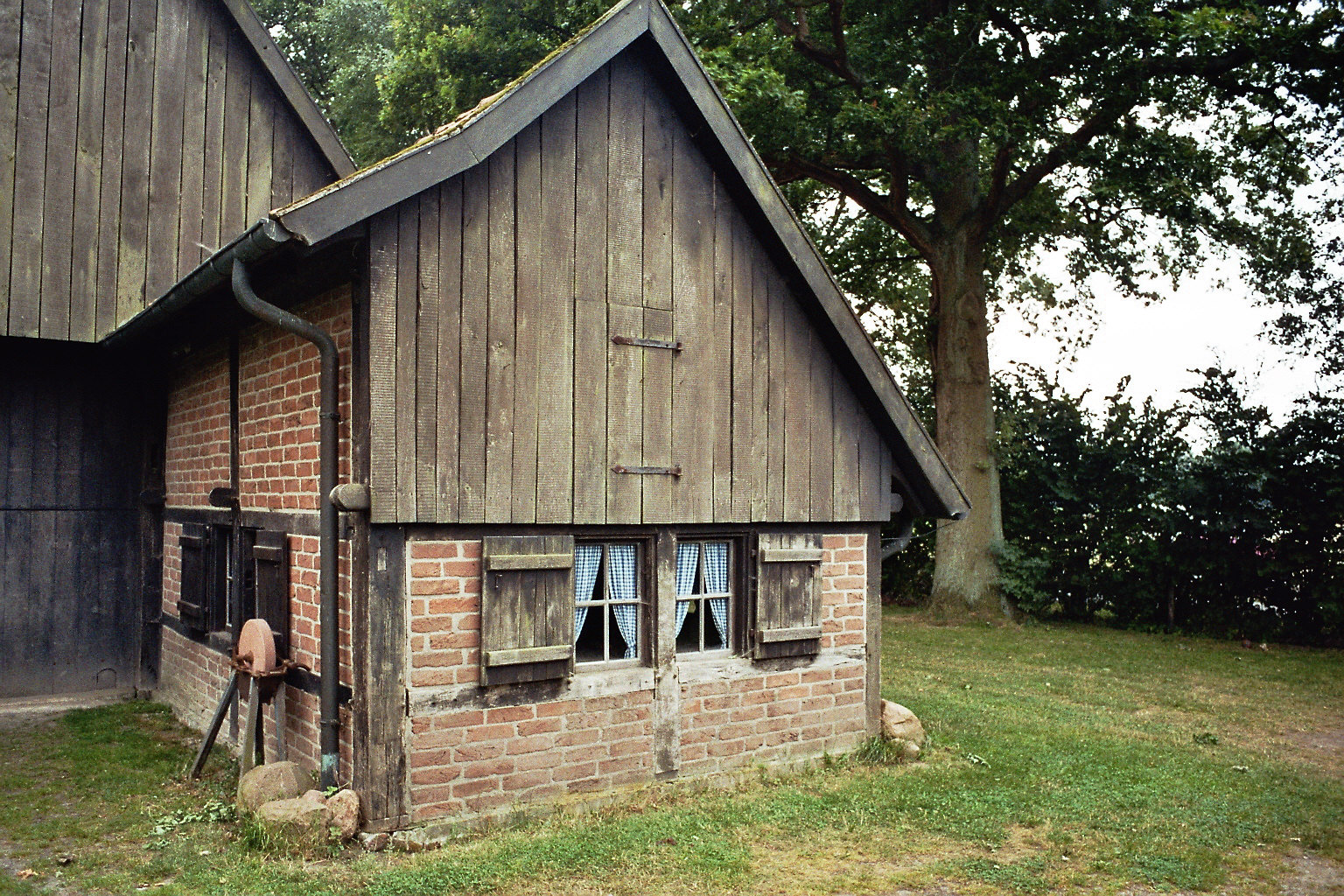
Anne Catherine Emmerich's birthplace in Flamschen

Flamschen (also Flamske) is a farming community in Coesfeld (Koesfeld), in Münsterland, Westphalia, Germany.

Flamschen is noted as the birthplace of Anne Catherine Emmerich.
