= Church of Mary =

Ancient church ruins in Turkey

Coordinates: 37°56′41.78″N 27°20′21.13″E

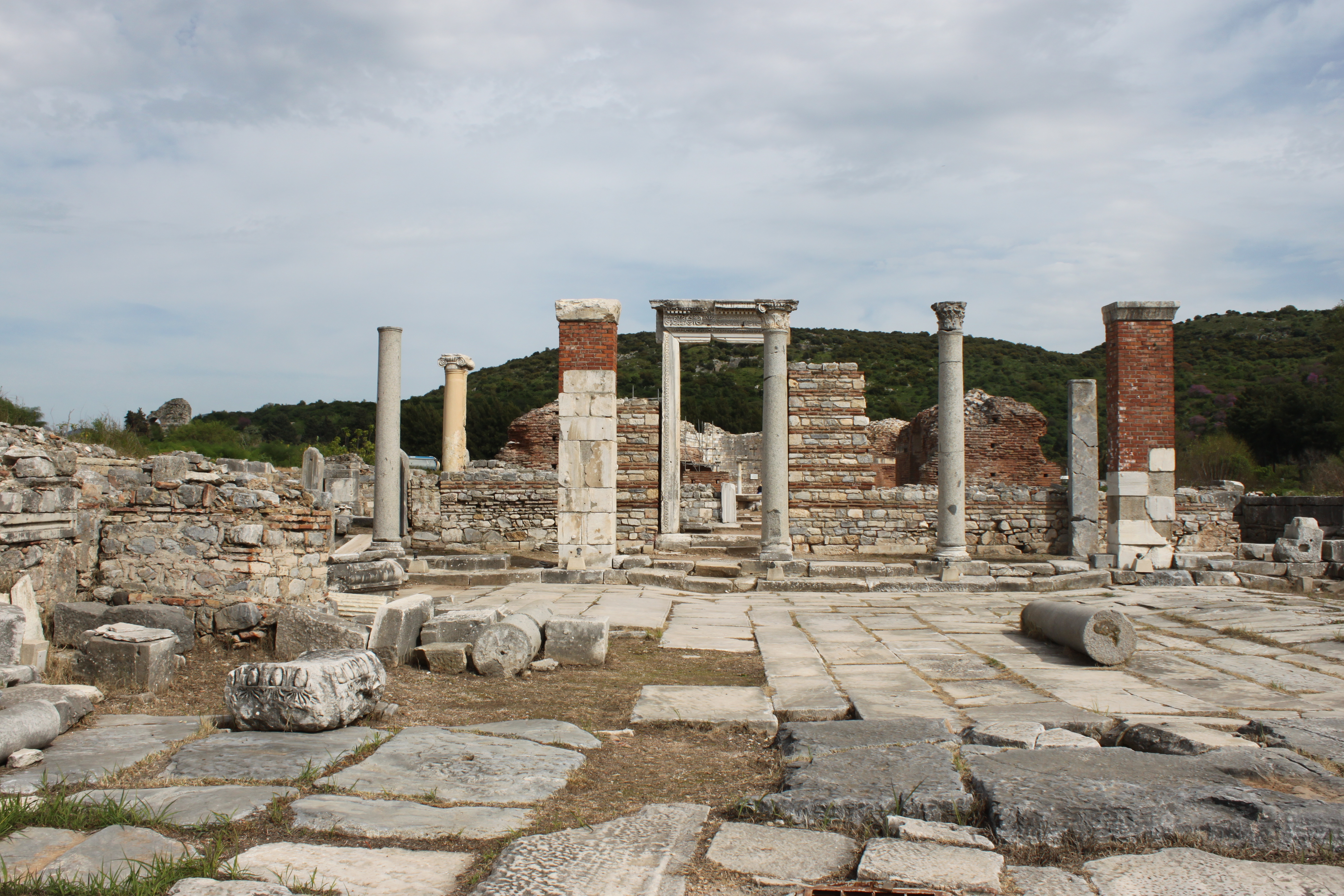
The Church of Mary in Ephesus

The Church of Mary (Turkish: Meryem Kilisesi) was an ancient Christian cathedral dedicated to the Theotokos ("Mother of God", i.e., the Virgin Mary), located in Ephesus (near present-day Selçuk in Turkey). It is also known as the Church of the Councils because several councils of importance to the history of Early Christianity (the First, Second and Third Council of Ephesus) are assumed to have been held within, although only the first one is accepted by Chalcedonian Christians. The church is located in the south stoa of the Olympieion (Temple of Hadrian Olympios) next to the harbor of Ephesus.

== History ==
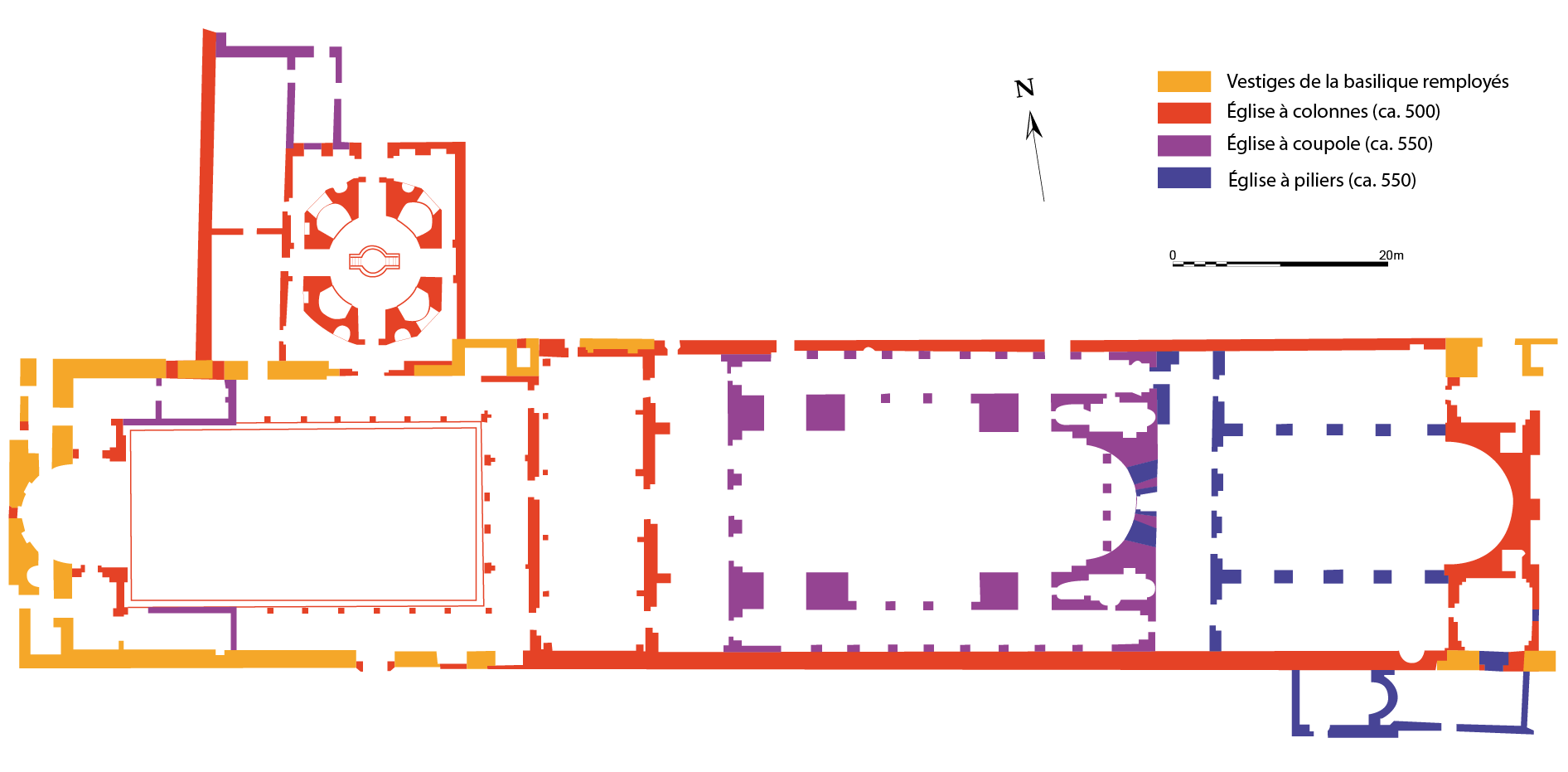
Building phases for the Church of Mary

The church dates to the early 5th century, a time when the city of Ephesus achieved prominence as the site of the First Council of Ephesus (the third Ecumenical Council) in 431. The building may have been constructed specifically for that third Ecumenical Council (called in November 430, opened in June 431), during which the title of Theotokos for the Mother of God was declared orthodox. The latest archaeological evidence suggests that the structure was built on the ruins of an earlier Roman basilica-like building abandoned around the 3rd century, known as the "Hall of the Muses". One tradition regards the Church of Mary (or its predecessor in Ephesus) as the earliest known Christian church dedicated to the Virgin Mary. Around 500, the Ephesians expanded this church into a monumental cathedral, whose apse and pillars partially still stand today on the site. It served as the seat of the Bishop of Ephesus throughout Late Antiquity.

An inscription in the Church of Mary indicates there was an even more-ancient synagogue in Ephesus.

== See also ==
- Metropolis of Ephesus
- Seven churches of Asia
- House of the Virgin Mary, also in Ephesus, believed to be the place where Virgin Mary lived until the Dormition
- Roman Catholic Marian churches
- Ancient Roman and Byzantine domes

== Resources ==
- Stefan Karweise, The Church of Mary and the Temple of Hadrian Olympios. Helmut Koester, ed., Ephesos: Metropolis of Asia (Harvard University Press, 1995), 311–20.
- Dr. Nikolaos Karydis, The Development of the Church of St Mary at Ephesos from Late Antiquity to the Dark Ages, From Kent University Repository.
