= Marie de Mandat-Grancey =

Servant of God Marie de Mandat-Grancey, D.C.
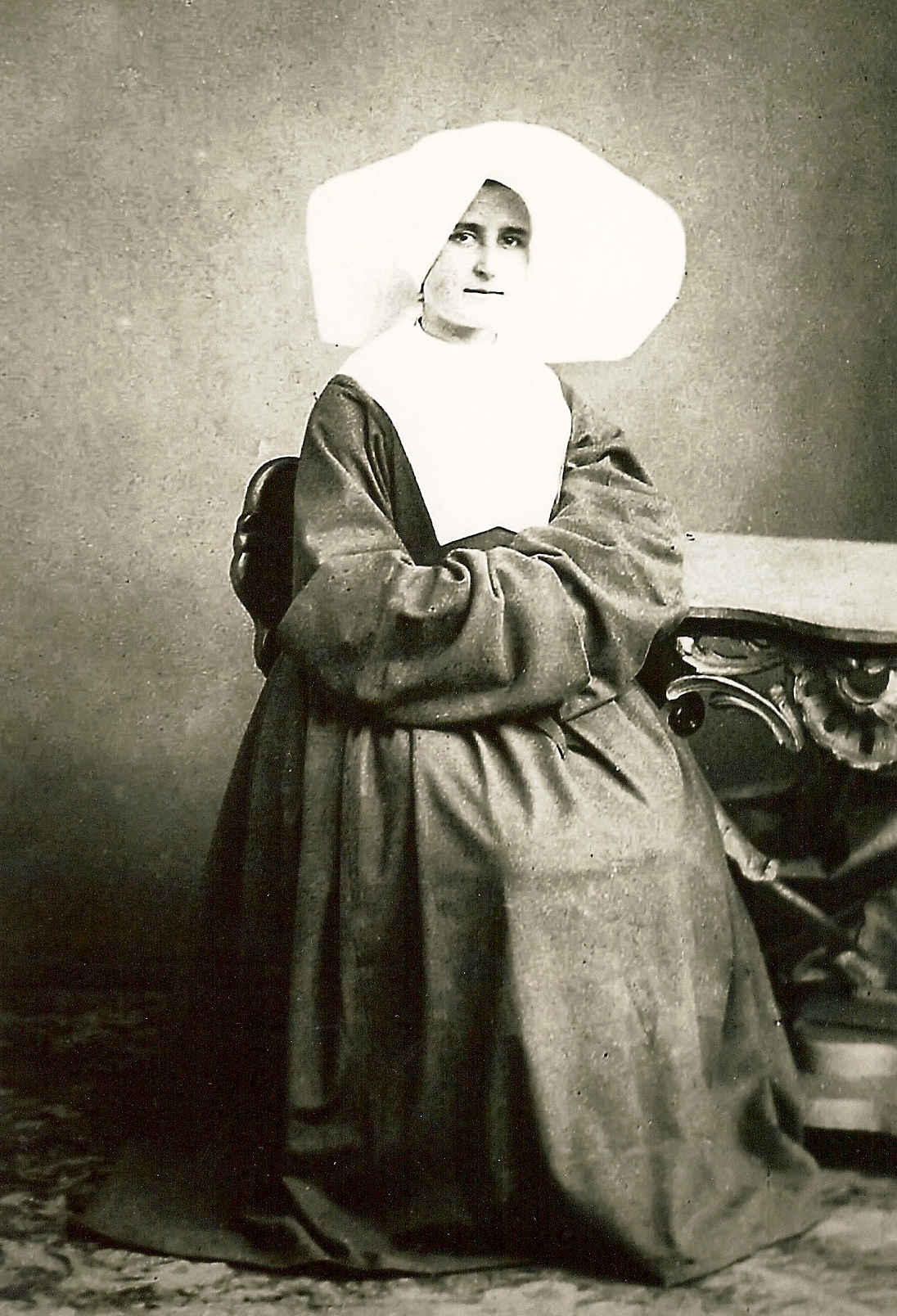
- Sister Marie de Mandat-Grancey

Vowed Member
- Born: Adèle-Louise-Marie de Mandat-Grancey; 13 September 1837; Grancey-le-Château, Côte-d’Or, France
- Died: 31 May 1915 (aged 77); İzmir, Turkey
- Venerated in: Roman Catholic Church

Marie de Mandat-Grancey, Daughters of Charity, (September 13, 1837 – May 31, 1915) was a Roman Catholic religious sister, best known for her involvement in the discovery of the House of the Virgin Mary in Ephesus, Turkey.

== Biography ==
Sister Marie de Mandat-Grancey, DC. was born of a distinguished family at the family estate - Chateau de Grancey (Bourgogne) in France, in 1837. Her family included two popes and several saints. In 1858 she became a sister when she joined the Daughters of Charity of St. Vincent De Paul in the parish of St. Sulpice, Paris. On September 27, 1862, she made her Religious Profession. After years of nursing in France, she was assigned to the Mission to Turkey in 1886, serving in the French Naval Hospital at Smyrna. In 1890 she became the Superior of the Community and of the Hospital.

== Mary's Home ==
While in Smyrna (now İzmir), she became the central figure of an effort by Vincentian priests and archeologists to locate and identify a house (July 29, 1891) said to be originally occupied by Mary, the Mother of Jesus and St. John, the Beloved Disciple in the first century. She was part of a group of five who found the house in July 1891; she used her family's money to buy the house and the surrounding area.

Besides being a pious and devout Religious, Sister Marie was also gifted with a profound practical sensibility. She at once secured the purchase of the house and its property (November 15, 1892), despite many obstacles. The noteworthiness of the Domus Mariae (Meryem Ana Evi) is located in the fact that it is a precious shrine for both Muslims and Christians alike. Pope Paul VI visited the House on July 26, 1976 and Pope John Paul II came there to celebrate Mass, as a public pilgrim November 30, 1979. On November 29, 2006, Pope Benedict XVI visited the house and celebrated Mass. Sister Marie lived a heroic life of Christian charity and devout dedication to the dignity of Mary, the Mother of Jesus. Sister Marie died in 1915 in the midst of the First world War. Her cause for canonization is currently being considered.

== Bibliography ==
- The Life of Sr. Marie de Mandat-Grancey & Mary's House in Ephesus by Carl G. Schulte 2011, Saint Benedict Press ISBN 0-89555-870-X

== See also ==
1. Sr. Marie De Mandat-Grancey Foundation (P.O.Box 275 Cold Spring Harbor, NY 11724 USA)
