= Classmates (1952 film) =

1952 film

- Directed by: Schamyl Bauman
- Written by: Schamyl Bauman; Sölve Cederstrand
- Produced by: Arthur Spjuth
- Starring: Sickan Carlsson; Olof Winnerstrand; Stig Olin
- Cinematography: Rune Ericson
- Edited by: Lennart Wallén
- Music by: Thore Ehrling
- Production company: Bauman-Produktion
- Distributed by: Sandrew-Bauman
- Release date: 15 December 1952
- Running time: 106 minutes
- Country: Sweden
- Language: Swedish

Classmates (Swedish: Klasskamrater) is a 1952 Swedish comedy film directed by Schamyl Bauman and starring Sickan Carlsson, Olof Winnerstrand and Stig Olin. It was shot at the Centrumateljéerna Studios in Stockholm. The film's sets were designed by the art director Arthur Spjuth.

== Cast ==
- Sickan Carlsson as Anna-Greta Wallin
- Olof Winnerstrand as Carl-Otto Johansson, principal
- Stig Olin as Stig Andersson
- Karl-Arne Holmsten as Anders Björk
- Hjördis Petterson as Wilma Pettersson
- Pia Skoglund as Barbro Larsson
- Jan Molander as Sixten Törnqvist
- Rune Carlsten as Mauritz Stolpe
- John Botvid as Gustafsson
- Amy Jelf as Maj-Britt, student
- Tommy Nilson as Drinking student
- Hilma Barcklind as Lärarinna
- Sickan Castegren as Lärarinna
- Karin Hilke as Stig's hostess
- Sven Holmberg as Journalist
- Maritta Marke as Anna-Greta's hostess
- Aurore Palmgren as Angry disturbed old lady
- Hanny Schedin as Hulda
- Curt 'Minimal' Åström as Pressfotograf

== Bibliography ==
- Per Olov Qvist & Peter von Bagh, Guide to the Cinema of Sweden and Finland. Greenwood Publishing Group, 2000.
