= The Ghost Reporter =

1941 film

- Directed by: Schamyl Bauman
- Written by: Hasse Ekman
- Starring: Åke Söderblom; Thor Modéen; Annalisa Ericson
- Cinematography: Hilmer Ekdahl
- Edited by: Rolf Husberg
- Music by: Thore Ehrling; Ivan Söderberg
- Production company: Sandrews
- Distributed by: Sandrew-Baumanfilm
- Release date: 9 August 1941
- Running time: 91 minutes
- Country: Sweden
- Language: Swedish

The Ghost Reporter (Swedish: Spokreportern) is a 1941 Swedish comedy film directed by Schamyl Bauman and starring Åke Söderblom, Thor Modéen and Annalisa Ericson. It was shot at the Centrumateljéerna Studios in Stockholm. The film's sets were designed by the art director Arthur Spjuth.

The film tells the story of Augustus Blomkvist, who sells his sausage business, buys a newspaper and starts working there as a reporter under false name.

== Cast ==
- Åke Söderblom as Lasse Nylund
- Thor Modéen as Augustus Blomkvist / Emil Blomkvist
- Annalisa Ericson as Karin Blomkvist
- Erik Berglund as Tobias Holmgren
- Eric Abrahamsson as John Wester
- John Botvid as Nylund
- Torsten Winge as Diplomat
- Hilding Gavle as Amanuelo Fernando
- Viran Rydkvist as Ida Karlsson
- Emil Fjellström as Hesa Fredrik
- Bror Bügler as Snutfagra Svensson
- Wiktor Andersson as Kofots-Lasse
- Mimi Pollak as Ballet Teacher
- Gideon Wahlberg as Night Editor
- Erik A. Petschler as Diplomat
- Bror Abelli as Dr. Ahlman
- Folke Algotsson as Engineer
- Gunnar Björnstrand as Sausage Factory Engineer
- Artur Cederborgh as Editor Jonsson
- Elly Christiansson as Waitress
- Åke Claesson as Opera Director Fridell
- Julia Cæsar as Alfhild the Housekeeper
- Carl Ericson as Handyman
- Arthur Fischer as Editor Palmgren
- Axel Högel as Foreman
- Greta Liming as Ballet Girl
- Arne Lindblad as Manne Bergström
- Aurore Palmgren as Mrs. Nylund
- Hilmer Peters as Photographer
- Bellan Roos as Woman Cook
- Gunnel Wadner as Ballet Girl
- Bojan Westin as Ballet Girl
- Carl-Gunnar Wingård as Gentleman Waiting Outside
- Georg Årlin as Editor

== Bibliography ==
- Per Olov Qvist & Peter von Bagh, Guide to the Cinema of Sweden and Finland. Greenwood Publishing Group, 2000.
