= Olof Winnerstrand =

Swedish actor

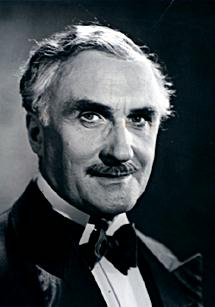
- Winnerstrand, ca 1940.
- Born: Carl Olof Magnus Winnerstrand; 26 August 1875; Stockholm, Sweden-Norway
- Died: 16 July 1956 (aged 80); Stockholm, Sweden
- Occupation: Actor
- Years active: 1901–1955
- Spouse: Frida Winnerstrand (m. 1906–1943)

Carl Olof Magnus Winnerstrand (26 August 1875 – 16 July 1956) was a Swedish stage and film actor.

== Biography ==
Born in a bourgeois home in Stockholm, Winnerstrand was a son of the well-known Stockholm goldsmith and jeweller C.A. Winnerstrand, and started out in his father's footsteps, learning the trade. His parents opposed his acting dreams and, being loyal to a promise to his father, he took over the family business when his father died in 1899, and worked a couple of years as goldsmith. However, his longing for the stage increased and he was encouraged by great Swedish actor Emil Hillberg in pursuing in acting, after he had witnessed Winnerstrand's striking talent and by offering a place in his theatre company. Now, this time with the blessing of his mother, he sold the family company and joined Hillberg's theatre troupe.

Olof Winnerstrand made his professional debut in 1901 at Helsingborg City Theatre and then toured with the Hillberg Company in 1901-02 and then with the famous Selander Company 1902–04, where he met his future wife, Frida Kumlin. They married in 1906 and for decades were one of Swedish theatre's most popular and beloved theatre couples, often working together on stage, and in film and radio.

In 1906 he was contracted by the notorious theatre manager Albert Ranft to play at Vasateatern (Vasa Theatre), the theatre stage above all in Sweden with a tradition of playing farces and comedies. Here Winnerstrand rose to star fame in the late 1900s as a top comedy actor, for years performing leading parts in numerous farces and comedies popular of those days by Oscar Wilde, George Bernard Shaw, Georges Feydeau and Georges Berr (in many of the original Swedish stagings of the plays); such as his Mr Ernest in Oscar Wilde's The Importance of Being Earnest, Mr Valentine in Shaw's You Never Can Tell, in Franz Arnold's & Ernst Bach's The Spanish Fly (Die Spanische Fliege; Spanska flugan) and as Vicomte Goring in Wilde's An Ideal Husband.

By 1919 Winnerstrand had made a name for himself as a comedy actor and was asked by the then manager of the national stage, Tor Hedberg, to come and perform at the Royal Dramatic Theatre (Dramaten). Just seeking a change at the time, Winnerstrand came to remain at the national stage until his retirement in 1949; he performed in altogether 119 parts between 1919 and 1949, here also showing himself as a strong and versatile actor in drama plays and in character parts. He is considered as one of Sweden's very finest stage and film actors of the early 20th century.

Successful and critically acclaimed parts at Dramaten include his Bo Swedenhielm in Hjalmar Bergman's Swedenhielms (1925), Argan in Molière's The Imaginary Invalid (1927), Pisthetairos in The Birds by Aristophanes (1928), Sir Basil Winterton in Edward Childs Carpenter's The Bachelor Father (1930), Alfred Jingle in Dickens' The Pickwick Club (1931), Chlestakov in Nikolai Gogol's The Inspector General (1932), the King of Babylon in Marc Connelly's The Green Pastures (1932), Måns Sommar in Strindberg's Mäster Olof (1933), Fabrikör Åvik in Birger Sjöbergs Kvartetten som sprängdes (The Quartet That Broke Up) (1935), Nat Miller in Eugene O'Neill's Ah, Wilderness! (1935–36), Richard Greatham in Noël Coward's Hay Fever (1937), Frank Haines in Dodie Smith's Call It A Day (1937), Titus Jaywood in Mark Reed's Yes, My Darling Daughter (1938), Charles Randolph in Dodie Smith's Dear Octopus (1939), Don Pedro in Shakespeare's Much Ado About Nothing (1940), Fritz Kelemen in Rose Franken's Claudia (1942), Lindgren in Karl Ragnar Gierow's Av hjärtans lust (1945), Hartman in Jean Anouilh's The Wild Bird (1948) and Charley in Arthur Miller's Death of a Salesman (1949).

On film he later in life presented several strong supporting parts, for example in early Ingmar Bergman films Torment 1944 (script by Bergman), Woman Without a Face 1947 (script by Bergman), Music in Darkness 1948 and A Lesson in Love 1955. He also appeared in strong parts in film director Hasse Ekman's Kungliga patrasket 1945 and Medan porten var stängd 1946, and in several film comedies opposite Sickan Carlsson (between 1945 and 1955), directed by Schamyl Bauman.

== Selected filmography ==
- Dance on Roses (1954)
- A Lesson in Love (1954)
- The Girl from Backafall (1953)
- Classmates (1952)
- My Friend Oscar (1951)
- My Sister and I (1950)
- Fiancée for Hire (1950)
- Teacher's First Born (1950)
- The Saucepan Journey (1950)
- The Kiss on the Cruise (1950)
- The Quartet That Split Up (1950)
- Playing Truant (1949)
- Love Wins Out (1949)
- Music in Darkness (1948)
- A Swedish Tiger (1948)
- I Love You Karlsson (1947)
- While the Door Was Locked (1946)
- Affairs of a Model (1946)
- Desire (1946)
- Det glada kalaset (1946)
- Kungliga patrasket (The Royal Rabble) (1945)
- The Rose of Tistelön (1945)
- Torment (1944)
- The Emperor of Portugallia (1944)
- The Invisible Wall (1944)
- I Am Fire and Air (1944)
- The Bjorck Family (1940)
- Emilie Högquist (1939)
- Blixt och dunder (Summer Lightning) (1938)
- Russian Flu (1937)
- John Ericsson, Victor of Hampton Roads (1937)
- Adventure (1936)
- The Family Secret (1936)
- Modern Wives (1932)
- Getting Married (1926)

== Stage work ==
- Complete list of Olof Winnerstrand's parts at the Royal Dramatic Theatre (Dramaten)
