= Robinson in Roslagen =

1948 film

- Directed by: Schamyl Bauman
- Written by: Albert Engström (novels); Schamyl Bauman; Erik Lundegård
- Produced by: Arthur Spjuth
- Starring: Adolf Jahr; Ludde Gentzel; Gull Natorp
- Cinematography: Rune Ericson
- Edited by: Lennart Wallén
- Music by: Charles Redland
- Production company: Bauman-Produktion
- Distributed by: Sandrew-Baumanfilm
- Release date: 25 September 1948
- Running time: 83 minutes
- Country: Sweden
- Language: Swedish

Robinson in Roslagen (Swedish: Robinson i Roslagen) is a 1948 Swedish comedy film co-written and directed by Schamyl Bauman and starring Adolf Jahr, Ludde Gentzel and Gull Natorp. It was shot at the Centrumateljéerna Studios in Stockholm and on location at Grisslehamn. The film's sets were designed by the art director Arthur Spjuth.

== Cast ==
- Adolf Jahr as Alfred
- Ludde Gentzel as Mandus
- Gull Natorp as Katrina
- Sigbrit Molin as Rosa
- Olof Bergström as Gunnar
- Carl Hagman as Tegel
- Margit Andelius as Esmeralda's sister
- Albin Erlandzon as Fisherman
- Claes Esphagen as Constable's deputy
- Siegfried Fischer as Norman
- Åke Fridell as Constable
- Mona Geijer-Falkner as Fishing woman
- Viktor Haak as Fisherman at pier
- Nils Hallberg as Jonne
- Gottfrid Holde as Customs officer
- Siv Larsson as Miss Larsson
- Birger Lensander as Customs officer
- Wilma Malmlöf as Esmeralda
- Georg Skarstedt as Holmberg
- Carl Ström as Sheriff
- Alf Östlund as Customs officer

== Bibliography ==
- Per Olov Qvist & Peter von Bagh. Guide to the Cinema of Sweden and Finland. Greenwood Publishing Group, 2000.
