= Kihlberg =

Kihlberg is a surname. Notable people with the surname include:

- Magnus Kihlberg, Swedish footballer
- Nils Kihlberg (1915–1965), Swedish actor
