= Playing Truant =

1949 film

- Directed by: Schamyl Bauman
- Written by: István Békeffy (play); Adorján Stella (play); Sölve Cederstrand
- Produced by: Arthur Spjuth
- Starring: Sickan Carlsson; Gunnar Björnstrand; Olof Winnerstrand
- Cinematography: Hilding Bladh
- Edited by: Lennart Wallén
- Music by: Kai Gullmar; Sune Waldimir
- Production company: Bauman-Produktion
- Distributed by: Sandrew-Baumanfilm
- Release date: 15 August 1949
- Running time: 111 minutes
- Country: Sweden
- Language: Swedish

Playing Truant (Swedish: Skolka skolan) is a 1949 Swedish comedy film directed by Schamyl Bauman and starring Sickan Carlsson, Gunnar Björnstrand and Olof Winnerstrand. It was shot at the Centrumateljéerna Studios in Stockholm and on location in the city. The film's sets were designed by the art director Arthur Spjuth.

== Cast ==
- Sickan Carlsson as Margareta Carlson-Kronberg
- Gunnar Björnstrand as Bertil Kronberg
- Olof Winnerstrand as Paulus Bomvall
- Viveca Serlachius as Gertrud 'Truttan' Karlberg
- Dagmar Ebbesen as Hilda
- Gösta Cederlund as Oskar Carlsson
- Gull Natorp as Mrs. Agda Carlsson
- Anne-Margrethe Björlin as Helene Berglöf
- Naima Wifstrand as Dehlin
- Jan Molander as Hjalmar Hammarlund
- Mimi Pollak as Märta Hoffman
- Maud Söderlund as Alice
- Edvin Adolphson as Man in the Restaurant
- Harriet Andersson as School Girl in Stockholm
- Wiktor Andersson as Wardrobist
- Olga Appellöf as Teacher in Dream
- Ingrid Björk as Karla
- John Botvid as Restaurant Guest
- Kerstin 'Kicki' Bratt as School Girl in Enköping
- Lena Brogren as School Girl in Stockholm
- Erland Colliander as Teacher
- Eivor Engelbrektsson as Gymnastics Teacher
- Sven-Eric Gamble as Man Delivering Flowers
- Sten Hedlund as Teacher
- Douglas Håge as Bum
- Ivar Kåge as Andrén
- Signe Lundberg-Settergren asTeacher
- Nils Ohlin as Train Passenger
- Gunvor Pontén as School Girl in Enköping
- Sif Ruud as Miss Hoffman's Friend in Uppsala
- Öllegård Wellton as School Girl in Enköping
- Torsten Winge as Berglöf

== Bibliography ==
- Per Olov Qvist & Peter von Bagh, Guide to the Cinema of Sweden and Finland. Greenwood Publishing Group, 2000.
