= My Passionate Longing =

1956 film

- German poster
- Directed by: Bengt Logardt
- Written by: Ingrid Beije (novel); Bengt Logardt
- Starring: Margit Carlqvist; Alf Kjellin; Karl-Arne Holmsten
- Cinematography: Jan Lindeström
- Edited by: Wic Kjellin
- Music by: Harry Arnold
- Production company: Europa Film
- Distributed by: Europa Film
- Release date: 19 November 1956
- Running time: 102 minutes
- Country: Sweden
- Language: Swedish

My Passionate Longing (Swedish: Het är min längtan) is a 1956 Swedish drama film directed by Bengt Logardt and starring Margit Carlqvist, Alf Kjellin and Karl-Arne Holmsten. It was shot at the Sundbyberg Studios of Europa Film in Stockholm. The film's sets were designed by the art director Arne Åkermark.

== Cast ==
- Margit Carlqvist as Nina
- Alf Kjellin as Mikael
- Bengt Logardt as Hans
- Karl-Arne Holmsten as Erik
- Ulla Sjöblom as Iris
- Naima Wifstrand as Lisa
- Catrin Westerlund as Solveig
- Birgit Rosengren as Hotel-Keeper
- Åke Claesson as Nina's Father
- Linnéa Hillberg as Nina's Mother
- Ulla-Bella Fridh as Maj-Britt
- Marianne Aminoff as Mrs. Grönberg
- Inga Sarri as Pregnant girl
- Henrik Schildt as Chief Physician
- Mats Bahr as Björn Lilja
- Lily Berglund as Singer
- Tor Bergner as Self
- Fritiof Billquist as Professor
- Eric Gustafson as Malmö Doctor
- Birgitta Hellerstedt as Consuless
- Willy Koblanck as Abortionist
- Gösta Krantz as Chauffeur
- Hanny Schedin as Aunt Valborg
- Lasse Swärd as Radiologist

== Bibliography ==
- Qvist, Per Olov & von Bagh, Peter. Guide to the Cinema of Sweden and Finland. Greenwood Publishing Group, 2000.
