= A Real Man (film) =

1940 Swedish comedy film

- Directed by: Schamyl Bauman
- Written by: Hasse Ekman; Bengt Idestam-Almquist; Adolf Jahr
- Produced by: Schamyl Bauman
- Starring: Adolf Jahr; Birgit Tengroth; Sigurd Wallén
- Cinematography: Hilmer Ekdahl; Hilding Bladh
- Edited by: Rolf Husberg
- Music by: Eskil Eckert-Lundin
- Production company: Sandrew-Bauman
- Distributed by: Sandrew-Baumanfilm
- Release date: 24 August 1940
- Running time: 106 minutes
- Country: Sweden
- Language: Swedish

A Real Man (Swedish: Karl för sin hatt) is a 1940 Swedish comedy film directed by Schamyl Bauman and starring Adolf Jahr, Birgit Tengroth and Sigurd Wallén. It was shot at the Centrumateljéerna Studios in Stockholm. The film's sets were designed by the art director Arthur Spjuth.

It was nominated for Best Foreign Film at the 1941 Venice Film Festival but did not win.

== Cast ==
- Adolf Jahr as Ola Hansson
- Birgit Tengroth as Gun Bergström
- Sigurd Wallén as Algot Bergström
- Gull Natorp as Mrs. Betty Bergström
- Emil Fjellström as Uncle Stor-Ola Hansson
- Stig Järrel as Jimmy
- Vera Valdor as Tilda
- Gösta Cederlund as Head of the Department
- Anna-Greta Adolphson as Dinner Guest
- Ann-Margret Bergendahl as Gun's Friend
- Margareta Bergfeldt a s Ulla
- Betty Bjurström as Bergström's Maid
- Gunnar Björnstrand as Clerk
- Gösta Bodin as Clerk
- Ingrid Borthen as Ann Marie
- John Botvid as Recording Clerk
- Gudrun Brost as Monica
- Ernst Brunman as Civil Servant
- Åke Engfeldt as Krister
- Ziri-Gun Eriksson as Sonja
- Gustaf Färingborg as Kurt
- Helga Hallén as Gun's Friend
- Torsten Hillberg as Clerk
- Inga Hodell as Miss Dahl
- Nils Hultgren as Civil Servant
- Åke Johansson as Ville
- Barbro Kollberg as Barbro
- Aurore Palmgren as Hulda
- Willy Peters as Nils
- Gun Robertson as Dinner Guest
- Greta Tegnér as Maid
- Olov Wigren as Clerk
- Signe Wirff as Lady Partner at Table

== Bibliography ==
- Per Olov Qvist & Peter von Bagh. Guide to the Cinema of Sweden and Finland. Greenwood Publishing Group, 2000.
