= Flickorna i Småland =

Song
- Language: Swedish
- Written: 1912
- Genre: Schlager
- Composer: Fridolf Lundberg
- Lyricist: Karl "Kalle i Dalen" Williams

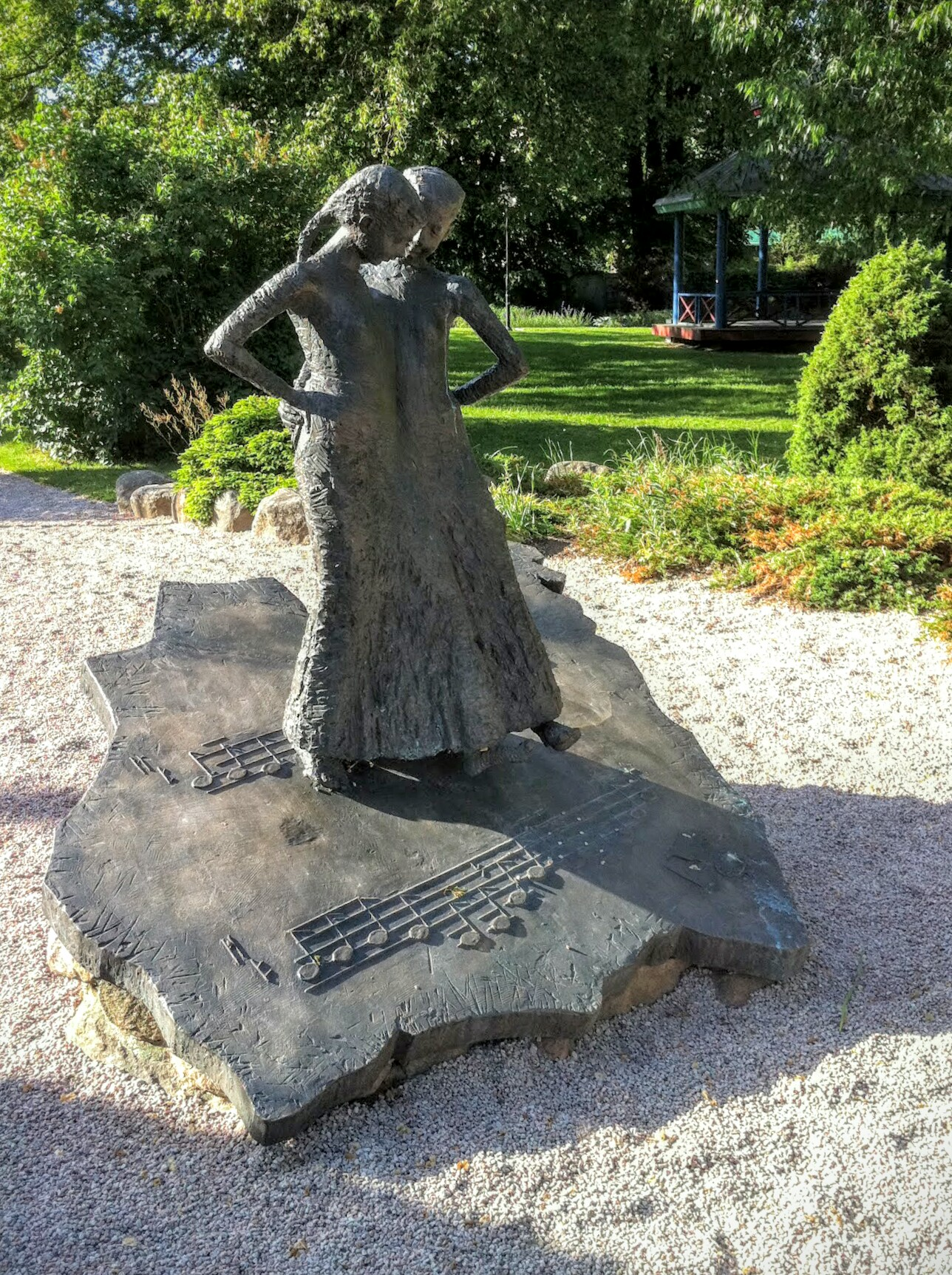
The statue in Ljungby was erected in 1992 to "commemorate Karl Williams' famous creation 'Flickorna i Småland'".

"Flickorna i Småland" (Swedish pronunciation: [ˈflɪ̂kːʊɳa iː ˈsmǒːland]; English: "The Girls in Småland") is a Swedish song written in 1912 by Karl Williams (known as Kalle i Dalen) and composed by Fridolf Lundberg. It became a long lived schlager. According to the Swedish Tourist Association's 1968 yearbook, Karl Williams got his inspiration to the song a sunday, mid-year through 1912, on his way from Hamneda to a party in Torpa. While repairing his flat bicycle tire he got to see three beautiful girls around some nearby heather hills.

"Flickorna i Småland" has been recorded several times. One of the earliest versions is by Eric Engström, who made an acoustic recording, without microphone, at Hotel Continental in Stockholm on November 15, 1919. In 1945 the song was sung by Sickan Carlsson in the eponymous movie The Girls in Smaland.

When the American vocal group The Delta Rhythm Boys toured around Sweden they picked up the song, which they first recorded in 1951. Their version became so successful that its melody is still mainly associated with them.

Eddie Meduza released a version of it in 2002.

Lalla Hansson made his own version of the song with modified lyrics called "Det är killarna från Södermannagatan 61" (English: "It is the guys from Södermanna Street 61").

The hosts Lena Philipsson and Charlotte Perrelli sung it during the live-broadcast Melodifestivalen 2003 in Jönköping as an intermission act. The song was again sung during Melodifestivalen 2016 by Gina Dirawi and Charlotte Perrelli.
