= The Girls in Smaland (film) =

1945 film

- Directed by: Schamyl Bauman
- Written by: Karl Gunnarson (novel); Rune Waldekranz; Schamyl Bauman; Ragnar Arvedson
- Produced by: Ragnar Arvedson
- Starring: Sickan Carlsson; Åke Grönberg; Sigge Fürst
- Cinematography: Hilmer Ekdahl
- Edited by: Lennart Wallén
- Music by: Gunnar Johansson
- Production company: Bauman-Produktion
- Distributed by: Sandrew-Baumanfilm
- Release date: 28 November 1945
- Running time: 101 minutes
- Country: Sweden
- Language: Swedish

The Girls in Smaland (Swedish: Flickorna i Småland) is a 1945 Swedish romantic drama film directed by Schamyl Bauman and starring Sickan Carlsson, Åke Grönberg and Sigge Fürst. It was shot at the Centrumateljéerna Studios in Stockholm. The film's sets were designed by the art director Arthur Spjuth. It takes its title from the popular 1912 song of the same title.

== Synopsis ==
Gunnar takes a train to Vimmerby to look for work. The area is famous for beautiful woman, but he lands a job as a farmhand on the mean-spirited male farmer Jönsson's property. When he grows tired of this he finds a new job with a female farm owner Christina Larsson, but she is nothing like he expected.

== Cast ==
- Sickan Carlsson as Christina Larsson
- Åke Grönberg as Gunnar
- Sigge Fürst as Algotsson
- Ruth Kasdan as Tattar-Emma
- Douglas Håge as Jönsson
- Carl Reinholdz as Alfred Forsman
- Rut Holm as Hanna
- Ingrid Östergren as Märtha
- John Elfström as Laban
- Carin Swensson as Ottilia
- Ninni Löfberg as Ester
- Olga Appellöf as Woman
- Kolbjörn Knudsen as Måns
- Nils Hallberg as Gypsy
- Artur Rolén as Photographer
- Viktor Haak as Daniel ve Korsgrinna
- Gösta Prüzelius as Agronomist
- Stig Johanson as Man
- Siegfried Fischer as Potential horse buyer
- Mona Geijer-Falkner as Old woman at the market
- John Hilke as Employment agency clerk
- Birger Lensander as Farm hand kicked out by Jönsson
- Aurore Palmgren as Grandmother
- Andrew Walter as Accordion player
- Tom Walter as Train driver
- Inga-Lill Åhström as Waitress

== Bibliography ==
- Per Olov Qvist & Peter von Bagh. Guide to the Cinema of Sweden and Finland. Greenwood Publishing Group, 2000.
