= The Family Secret (1936 film) =

1936 film

- Directed by: Gustaf Molander
- Written by: Gösta Stevens
- Based on: The Secret of Polichinelle by Pierre Wolff
- Starring: Olof Winnerstrand; Karin Swanström; Erik 'Bullen' Berglund
- Cinematography: Åke Dahlqvist
- Edited by: Oscar Rosander
- Music by: Eric Bengtson
- Production company: Svensk Filmindustri
- Distributed by: Svensk Filmindustri
- Release date: 26 December 1936
- Running time: 89 minutes
- Country: Sweden
- Language: Swedish

The Family Secret (Swedish: Familjens hemlighet) is a 1936 Swedish comedy film directed by Gustaf Molander and starring Olof Winnerstrand, Karin Swanström and Erik 'Bullen' Berglund. It is based on the 1903 French play The Secret of Polichinelle by Pierre Wolff, and a French adaptation was also produced the same year. The film premiered in Gothenburg in December 1936.

The film's sets were designed by the art director Arne Åkermark.

== Synopsis ==
A middle-class family, planning an arranged marriage for their adult son with a wealthy heiress, are shocked to discover that not only is he already engaged, but his fiancée has already borne them a grandson who is three-year-old now.

== Cast ==
- Olof Winnerstrand as Arvid Ekman
- Karin Swanström as Lillie Ekman
- Erik 'Bullen' Berglund as John Hessler
- Birgit Tengroth as Margit Berg
- Kotti Chave as Arne Ekman
- Hjördis Petterson as Ellen Winkler
- Gösta Bernhard as Olle
- Wiktor Andersson as Orderly
- Ingrid Borthen as Marianne Winkler, Ellen's daughter
- John Botvid as First mate
- Greta Ericson as Gullan, Margit's friend at work
- Jullan Jonsson as Emma, Hessler's housemaid
- Ka Nerell as Greta, child nurse
- Ruth Weijden as Maria, Ekman's housemaid

== Bibliography ==
- Per Olov Qvist & Peter von Bagh, Guide to the Cinema of Sweden and Finland. Greenwood Publishing Group, 2000.
