= No Way Back (1947 film) =

1947 film

- Directed by: Edvin Adolphson
- Written by: Edvin Adolphson; Ragnar af Geijerstam
- Based on: Drift by Hans Severinsen
- Produced by: Carl Nelson
- Starring: Edvin Adolphson; Anita Björk; Gaby Stenberg
- Cinematography: Hilding Bladh
- Edited by: Lennart Wallén
- Music by: Sune Waldimir
- Production company: Monark Film
- Distributed by: Sandrew-Baumanfilm
- Release date: 18 August 1947
- Running time: 98 minutes
- Country: Sweden
- Language: Swedish

No Way Back (Swedish: Ingen väg tillbaka) is a 1947 Swedish drama film directed by and starring Edvin Adolphson and also featuring Anita Björk, Olof Bergström and Gaby Stenberg. It was shot at the Centrumateljéerna Studios in Stockholm. The film's sets were designed by the art director Arthur Spjuth.

== Synopsis ==
Hugo Henriksen, a widowed businessman in wartime occupied Copenhagen is about to be granted a directorship and is persuaded by his daughter Evelyn to go out and celebrate. During an air raid a series of events lead to him accidentally killing a prostitute who had accosted him. He is witness leaving the vicinity by Preben, a young man who hopes to marry Evelyn. Henriksen leaves the city to avoid the hue and cry, and briefly enjoys some days of happiness with a woman Inger who he meets. However, he abruptly leaves her and returns to Copenhagen.

He discovers Preben is mixed up with the anti-German resistance movement. He eventually also sacrifices himself in the cause, as he is already a doomed man.

== Cast ==
- Edvin Adolphson as Hugo Henriksen
- Anita Björk as Evelyn
- Olof Bergström as Preben
- Gaby Stenberg as Inger
- Naemi Briese as Rosa
- Arnold Sjöstrand as Rasmussen
- Hugo Björne as Jespeersen
- Julie Bernby as Prostitute
- Nancy Dalunde as Prostitute
- Carl Hagman as Beer café host
- Aurore Palmgren as Mrs. Jörgensen
- Willy Peters as Benito

== Bibliography ==
- Qvist, Per Olov & von Bagh, Peter. Guide to the Cinema of Sweden and Finland. Greenwood Publishing Group, 2000.
