= One Fiancée at a Time =

1952 film

- Directed by: Schamyl Bauman
- Written by: Gösta Stevens
- Produced by: Arthur Spjuth
- Starring: Sickan Carlsson; Karl-Arne Holmsten; Edvin Adolphson
- Cinematography: Hilding Bladh
- Edited by: Lennart Wallén
- Music by: Ulf Peder Olrog
- Production company: Bauman-Produktion
- Distributed by: Sandrew-Baumanfilm
- Release date: 5 May 1952
- Running time: 104 minutes
- Country: Sweden
- Language: Swedish

One Fiancée at a Time (Swedish: En fästman i taget) is a 1952 Swedish comedy film directed by Schamyl Bauman and starring Sickan Carlsson, Karl-Arne Holmsten and Edvin Adolphson. It was shot at the Centrumateljéerna Studios in Stockholm. The film's sets were designed by the art director Arthur Spjuth.

== Synopsis ==
Lillian is engaged to the engineer Arne, but feels he is quite neglectful of her. In order to stir his interest she flirts with several other men.

== Cast ==
- Sickan Carlsson as Lillian 'Lillan' Carlberg
- Karl-Arne Holmsten as Arne Stockman
- Edvin Adolphson as Henning Werner
- Gunnar Björnstrand as Valentin Fredriksson-Frisk
- Stig Järrel as Adolf Lundkvist
- Stig Olin as Jerker Nordin
- Gull Natorp as Fru Stockman
- Arne Källerud as Överkonstapel i Falun
- Inger Juel as Clary
- John Botvid as Skomakare
- Carl-Gunnar Wingård as Johansson
- Olle Björklund as Radioröst
- Gustaf Färingborg as Statspolis
- Stig Johanson as Bilreparatör
- Holger Kax as Polis
- Birger Sahlberg as Olsson
- Arne Sandberg as Hotellvaktmästare
- Bengt Sundmark as Polis
- Birger Åsander as Bilchaufför

== Bibliography ==
- Per Olov Qvist & Peter von Bagh, Guide to the Cinema of Sweden and Finland. Greenwood Publishing Group, 2000.
