= My Sister and I (1950 film) =

1950 film

- Directed by: Schamyl Bauman
- Written by: Ralph Benatzky (operetta); Sölve Cederstrand; Georges Berr (play); Louis Verneuil(play)
- Produced by: S.A.G. Swenson
- Starring: Sickan Carlsson; Gunnar Björnstrand; Elof Ahrle
- Cinematography: Hilding Bladh; Hilmer Ekdahl
- Edited by: Lennart Wallén
- Music by: Ralph Benatzky
- Production company: Wivefilm
- Distributed by: Wivefilm
- Release date: 26 January 1950
- Running time: 106 minutes
- Country: Sweden
- Language: Swedish

My Sister and I (Swedish: Min syster och jag) is a 1950 Swedish comedy film directed by Schamyl Bauman and starring Sickan Carlsson, Gunnar Björnstrand and Elof Ahrle. It was shot at the Centrumateljéerna Studios in Stockholm. The film's sets were designed by Arthur Spjuth.

== Cast ==
- Sickan Carlsson as Katarina Hassel / Birgitta Hassel
- Gunnar Björnstrand as Architect Gunnar Stenwall
- Elof Ahrle as Julius Jöhs
- Nils Ericsson as Baron Pontus von Goosen
- Olof Winnerstrand as Baron Baltzar von Goosen
- Carin Swensson as Maria, Housemaid
- Cécile Ossbahr as Irene Jöhs
- Per Grundén as Baron Göran von Kullenberg
- Marianne Gyllenhammar as Liselotte Renning
- Anna-Lisa Baude as Selma Jöhs
- Axel Högel as Jönsson, Servant
- Bellan Roos as Cook at Colibri
- Birger Sahlberg as Karlsson
- Håkan von Eichwald as Pianist at Colibri
- Gunnel Wadner as Waiter
- Chris Wahlström as Birgit, Disher at Colibri

== Bibliography ==
- Per Olov Qvist & Peter von Bagh, Guide to the Cinema of Sweden and Finland. Greenwood Publishing Group, 2000.
