= The Three of Us (1940 film) =

1939 film

The Two of Us
- Directed by: Schamyl Bauman
- Written by: Hilding Östlund (novel); Bengt Idestam-Almquist; Gösta Stevens
- Produced by: Lorens Marmstedt
- Starring: Sture Lagerwall; Signe Hasso; Stig Järrel
- Cinematography: Hilmer Ekdahl
- Edited by: Rolf Husberg
- Music by: Olle Lindholm
- Production company: Bauman-Produktion
- Distributed by: Sandrew-Baumanfilm
- Release date: 19 October 1940
- Running time: 97 minutes
- Country: Sweden
- Language: Swedish

The Three of Us (Swedish: Vi tre) is a 1940 Swedish drama film directed by Schamyl Bauman and starring Sture Lagerwall, Signe Hasso and Stig Järrel. It was shot at the Centrumateljéerna Studios in Stockholm and on location around the city including the Central Station. The film's sets were designed by the art director Arthur Spjuth. It is a sequel to the 1939 film The Two of Us.

== Synopsis ==
Rising architect Sture Ahrengren is so obsessed with his work that he neglects his wife Kristina and young son.

== Cast ==
- Sture Lagerwall as Sture Ahrengren, arkitekt
- Signe Hasso as Kristina, hans hustru
- Olle Bauman as Olle, deras son
- Georg Løkkeberg as Arne Rank, arkitekt
- Stig Järrel as Baltsar Ekberg, ingenjör
- Ilse-Nore Tromm as Helena, hans hustru
- Gösta Cederlund as Professor Hagstam
- Carl Barcklind as Dr Frodde
- Sven Bergvall as Mr. Brown
- Astrid Bodin as Mrs. Blomgren
- Gösta Bodin as Andersson, Restaurant Manager
- Ingrid Borthen as Shop Assistant
- Elsa Ebbesen as Frodde's Maid
- John Ericsson as Mr. Hardwick
- Emil Fjellström as Hooligan
- Hartwig Fock as Drum Major
- Agda Helin as Mrs. Andersson
- Torsten Hillberg as Odelgren
- Nils Hultgren as Head Waiter Öqvist
- Axel Högel as Man from Gas Factory
- Stig Johanson as Waiter
- Signe Lundberg-Settergren as Maid Stina
- Bellan Roos as Lisa
- Ragnar Widestedt as Doctor
- Arne Lindblad as Man at Tourist Information

== Bibliography ==
- Qvist, Per Olov & von Bagh, Peter. Guide to the Cinema of Sweden and Finland. Greenwood Publishing Group, 2000.
