= Teacher's First Born =

1950 film

- Directed by: Schamyl Bauman
- Written by: Schamyl Bauman; Sölve Cederstrand
- Produced by: Arthur Spjuth
- Starring: Sickan Carlsson; Edvin Adolphson; Viveca Serlachius
- Cinematography: Hilding Bladh
- Edited by: Lennart Wallén
- Music by: Håkan von Eichwald
- Production company: Produktion S. Bauman AB
- Distributed by: Sandrew-Baumanfilm
- Release date: 26 July 1950
- Running time: 102 minutes
- Country: Sweden
- Language: Swedish

Teacher's First Born (Swedish: Frokens forsta barn) is a 1950 Swedish comedy film directed by Schamyl Bauman and starring Sickan Carlsson, Edvin Adolphson and Viveca Serlachius. It was shot at the Centrumateljéerna Studios in Stockholm. The film's sets were designed by the art director Bibi Lindström.

== Synopsis ==
An author is planning a book about single mothers, but his publisher is not convinced he knows enough about the subject and places an advertisement for single mothers to assist. The former journalist Sonja Broberg is very short of money and needs the job but is childless, so she borrows a boy from a children's home to support the masquerade.

== Cast ==
- Sickan Carlsson as Sonja Broberg, journalist
- Edvin Adolphson as Johannes Porshammar
- Olof Winnerstrand as Albert Wahlstrand
- Dagmar Ebbesen as Viktoria
- Viveca Serlachius as Birgit Björk
- Sven Lindberg as Willgot Mosch
- Douglas Håge as Gustafsson
- Nils Kihlberg as Göran Hallman
- Gösta Cederlund as Adolf Mosch
- Gull Natorp as Betty Mosch
- Christer Borg as Lukas
- Harriet Andersson as Hallman's bride
- Frithiof Bjärne as Police
- Astrid Bodin as Augusta
- John Botvid as Mr. Gran
- Carl-Axel Elfving as 'Nysis', photographer
- Mona Geijer-Falkner as Sales woman
- Axel Högel as Karlsson, groom
- Stig Johanson as Bus driver
- Magnus Kesster as Police
- Wilma Malmlöf as Cleaning-woman
- Sten Sture Modéen as Young man
- Bellan Roos as Willgott's hostess
- Alf Östlund as Postman

== Bibliography ==
- Qvist, Per Olov & von Bagh, Peter. Guide to the Cinema of Sweden and Finland. Greenwood Publishing Group, 2000.
- Segrave, Kerry & Martin, Linda. The Continental Actress: European Film Stars of the Postwar Era—biographies, Criticism, Filmographies, Bibliographies. McFarland, 1990.
