= The White Cat (film) =

1950 film

- Directed by: Hasse Ekman
- Written by: Walter Ljungquist (novel); Hasse Ekman
- Produced by: Hasse Ekman
- Starring: Alf Kjellin; Eva Henning; Sture Lagerwall; Gertrud Fridh
- Cinematography: Göran Strindberg
- Edited by: Lennart Wallén
- Music by: Erland von Koch; Lille Bror Söderlundh
- Production company: Hasse Ekmanfilm
- Distributed by: Sandrew-Baumanfilm
- Release date: 26 December 1950
- Running time: 93 minutes
- Country: Sweden
- Language: Swedish

The White Cat (Swedish: Den vita katten is a 1950 Swedish mystery drama film directed by Hasse Ekman and starring Alf Kjellin, Eva Henning and Sture Lagerwall.

The film's sets were designed by the art director Bibi Lindström. It was shot on location around Stockholm.

== Plot ==
A man arrives one night by train to Stockholm Central Station. The man has lost his memory. Newspapers report about an escaped insane sex offender, and the man dreads that it might be him.

In a café at the train station the man meets a waitress named Auri. She realizes that the man has no money and no place to go. He tells her about his situation. She offers to pay for his food and to take him home with her. The man, who calls himself X, and Auri start to trace his repressed memories and past life, while he dreads to find out why and what he fled.

== Main cast ==
- Alf Kjellin as "X", The man without identity
- Eva Henning as Auri Rautila, waitress
- Sture Lagerwall as Elias Sörbrunn, artist
- Gertrud Fridh as "Pax"
- Hugo Björne as "Väglusen"
- Ingrid Borthen as Ingeborg Eksell
- Gunnar Björnstrand as Jarl Eksell
- Gull Natorp as Otti Patkull
- Doris Svedlund as Girl in the school house
- Gösta Gustafson as Filip - the girls' father
- Margit Andelius as Ebba Patkull
- Stig Järrel as Algot
- Peter Blitz as Jerker
- Arne Ragneborn as Thief at the Central station
- Alf Östlund as Ticket collector

== Bibliography ==
- Per Olov Qvist & Peter von Bagh. Guide to the Cinema of Sweden and Finland. Greenwood Publishing Group, 2000.
