= Sölve Cederstrand =

Swedish film director and writer

- Born: 16 July 1900; Stockholm, Sweden
- Died: 30 December 1954 (aged 54); Stockholm, Sweden
- Occupations: Writer, Director
- Years active: 1920-1954 (film)

Sölve Cederstrand (1900–1954) was a Swedish screenwriter and film director. He was one of the most prolific screenwriters active in Swedish cinema during the 1930s alongside Torsten Lundqvist and Gösta Stevens.

== Selected filmography ==
- First Mate Karlsson's Sweethearts (1925)
- 40 Skipper Street (1925)
- The Rivals (1926)
- The Ghost Baron (1927)
- Black Rudolf (1928)
- Artificial Svensson (1929)
- Cavaliers of the Crown (1930)
- Ulla, My Ulla (1930)
- The Red Day (1931)
- Colourful Pages (1931)
- Ship Ahoy! (1931)
- A Night of Love by the Öresund (1931)
- Tired Theodore (1931)
- Servant's Entrance (1932)
- The Song to Her (1934)
- Andersson's Kalle (1934)
- Close Relations (1935)
- Under False Flag (1935)
- The People of Bergslagen (1937)
- Playing Truant (1949)
- Bohus Battalion (1949)
- My Sister and I (1950)
- Teacher's First Born (1950)
- My Name Is Puck (1951)
- Classmates (1952)
- Dance on Roses (1954)
- Darling of Mine (1955)

== Bibliography ==
- Iverson, Gunnar, Soderbergh Widding, Astrid & Soila, Tytti. Nordic National Cinemas. Routledge, 2005.
- Larsson, Mariah & Marklund, Anders. Swedish Film: An Introduction and Reader. Nordic Academic Press, 2010.
- Wallengren, Ann-Kristin. Welcome Home Mr Swanson: Swedish Emigrants and Swedishness on Film. Nordic Academic Press, 2014.
