= The Girl and the Devil =

1944 film

- Directed by: Hampe Faustman
- Written by: Bertil Malmberg
- Produced by: Lorens Marmstedt
- Starring: Kolbjörn Knudsen; Gunn Wållgren; Stig Järrel
- Cinematography: Hilding Bladh
- Music by: Lars-Erik Larsson; Moses Pergament
- Production company: Terrafilm
- Distributed by: Terrafilm
- Release date: 30 October 1944
- Running time: 92 minutes
- Country: Sweden
- Language: Swedish

The Girl and the Devil (Swedish: Flickan och djävulen) is a 1944 Swedish mystery thriller film directed by Hampe Faustman and starring Kolbjörn Knudsen, Gunn Wållgren and Stig Järrel. It was shot at the Centrumateljéerna Studios in Stockholm with location shooting in Hälsingland. The film's sets were designed by the art director P.A. Lundgren.

== Cast ==
- Kolbjörn Knudsen – Klas the Farmer
- Ingrid Borthen – His wife
- Hilda Borgström – Midwife
- Elsa Widborg – Marit the Witch
- Tord Stål – The Writer
- Gunn Wållgren – Karin
- Stig Järrel – The Peddler (The Devil)
- Sven Miliander – Mattias
- Linnéa Hillberg – Elin, his wife
- Anders Ek – Olof
- Toivo Pawlo – Hans
- Julia Cæsar – Gammel-Kersti
- Gull Natorp – Woman Being Forced to Buy a Skirt
- Carl Ström – Jonas
- Gösta Gustafson – The Tailor
- Rudolf Wendbladh – Reverend at Harvest Festival
- Hugo Jacobsson – Garv-Johan
- Hanny Schedin – Maid
- Erland Colliander – Farmer at Harvest Festival
- Britt Ångström – Maid
- Gert Lilienberg – Young Man Who Saw a Witch
- Birger Åsander – Listening Man
- Sture Ericson – Man at Harvest Festival

== Bibliography ==
- Qvist, Per Olov & von Bagh, Peter. Guide to the Cinema of Sweden and Finland. Greenwood Publishing Group, 2000.
