= My Name Is Puck =

1951 film

- Directed by: Schamyl Bauman
- Written by: Schamyl Bauman; Sölve Cederstrand
- Based on: Puck by Gunnar Widegren
- Produced by: Arthur Spjuth
- Starring: Sickan Carlsson; Karl-Arne Holmsten; Naima Wifstrand
- Cinematography: Hilding Bladh
- Edited by: Lennart Wallén
- Music by: Jules Sylvain
- Production company: Bauman-Produktion
- Distributed by: Sandrew-Baumanfilm
- Release date: 5 March 1951
- Running time: 101 minutes
- Country: Sweden
- Language: Swedish

My Name Is Puck (Swedish: Puck heter jag) is a 1951 Swedish comedy film directed by Schamyl Bauman and starring Sickan Carlsson, Karl-Arne Holmsten and Naima Wifstrand. It was shot at the Centrumateljéerna Studios in Stockholm. The film's sets were designed by the art director Bibi Lindström.

== Cast ==
- Sickan Carlsson as Puck Andersson
- Karl-Arne Holmsten as Roger Lindman
- Naima Wifstrand as Agneta Lindman
- Marianne Löfgren as Louise Haglund
- Anne-Margrethe Björlin as Elsa Ringschiöld
- John Botvid as Fredrik Göransson
- Jan Molander as Dr. Stellan Nilsson-Brosk
- Povel Ramel as Malte Jonsson
- Harriet Andersson as Dockie
- Hilma Barcklind as Mrs. Ringschiöld
- Josua Bengtson as Morbror Orvar
- Gösta Cederlund as Karl-Gustaf Ringschiöld
- Mona Geijer-Falkner as Fru Göransson
- Inga Hodell as Fru Strömberg
- Sven Holmberg as Police Constable
- Ludde Juberg as Jansson
- Aurore Palmgren as Lotten the Maid
- Olav Riégo as Art Dealer
- Ulla-Carin Rydén as Märta
- Bellan Roos as Miss Johansson
- Rune Stylander as Doctor
- Agda Helin as Woman in Tobacco Store

== Bibliography ==
- Per Olov Qvist & Peter von Bagh. Guide to the Cinema of Sweden and Finland. Greenwood Publishing Group, 2000.
