= The Two of Us (1939 film) =

1939 film

- Directed by: Schamyl Bauman
- Written by: Hilding Östlund (novel); Ragnar Hyltén-Cavallius
- Produced by: Lorens Marmstedt
- Starring: Sture Lagerwall; Signe Hasso; Stig Järrel
- Cinematography: Hilmer Ekdahl
- Edited by: Tage Holmberg
- Music by: Ernfrid Ahlin
- Production company: Terrafilm
- Distributed by: Terrafilm
- Release date: 13 March 1939
- Running time: 90 minutes
- Country: Sweden
- Language: Swedish

The Two of Us (Swedish: Vi två) is a 1939 Swedish drama film directed by Schamyl Bauman and starring Sture Lagerwall, Signe Hasso and Stig Järrel. It was shot at the Centrumateljéerna Studios in Stockholm. The film's sets were designed by the art director Arthur Spjuth. It was followed by a sequel The Three of Us in 1940.

== Synopsis ==
Architect Sture Ahrengren becomes entangled with the wife of his employer, despite having a supportive wife of his own.

== Cast ==
- Sture Lagerwall as Sture Ahrengren
- Signe Hasso as Kristina - hans hustru
- Stig Järrel as Baltsar Ekberg
- Ilse-Nore Tromm as Helena - hans hustru
- Gösta Cederlund as Professor Hagstam
- Carl Barcklind as Doktor Frodde
- Torsten Hillberg as Konsul Odelgren
- Gunnar Björnstrand as Doctor
- Gunnar Olsson as Bogren
- Lili Ziedner as Miss Edqvist, Hagstam's Secretary
- Stig Johanson as Construction Worker
- Karl Erik Flens as Construction Worker
- Axel Högel as Father at the Maternity Ward
- Arne Lindblad as Man by the Car Accident
- John Westin as Doctor
- Stina Sorbon as Sture's Secretary

== Bibliography ==
- Qvist, Per Olov & von Bagh, Peter. Guide to the Cinema of Sweden and Finland. Greenwood Publishing Group, 2000.
