= Ingrid Borthen =

Norwegian actress (1913–2001)

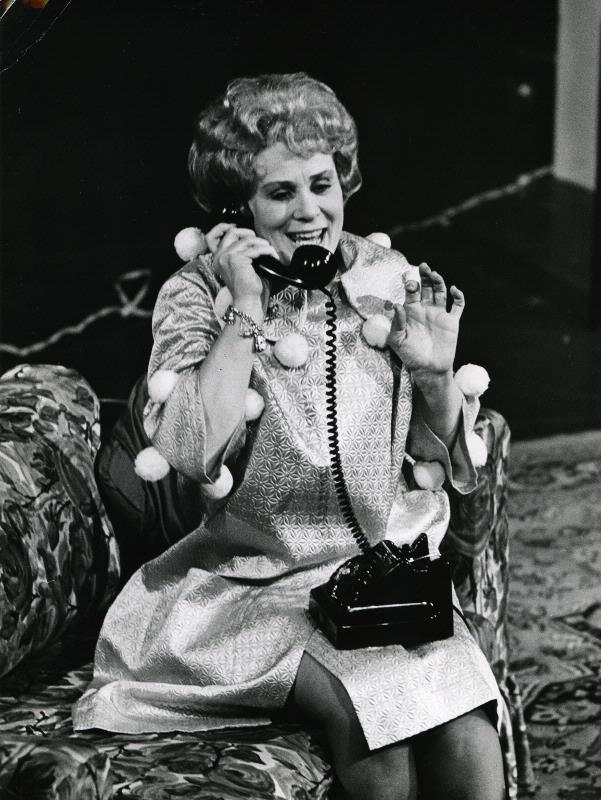
- Borthen appearing in a play (1963)
- Born: 22 September 1913; Trondheim, Norway
- Died: 17 March 2001 (aged 87); Stockholm, Sweden
- Occupation: Actress
- Years active: 1936–1963 (film)

Ingrid Borthen (1913–2001) was a Norwegian-born Swedish stage and film actress. She was involved with the Dramatist Studio of Sweden in Stockholm. She was married to the actor Ulf Johanson.

== Selected filmography ==
- The Family Secret (1936)
- Life Begins Today (1939)
- The Three of Us (1940)
- A Real Man (1940)
- The Girl and the Devil (1944)
- We Need Each Other (1944)
- Iris and the Lieutenant (1946)
- The Balloon (1946)
- The Girl from the Marsh Croft (1947)
- A Ship Bound for India (1947)
- Rail Workers (1947)
- On These Shoulders (1948)
- The White Cat (1950)
- Divorced (1951)
- The Lady in Black (1958)
- The Judge (1960)

== Bibliography ==
- Cowie, Peter Françoise Buquet, Risto Pitkänen & Godfried Talboom. Scandinavian Cinema: A Survey of the Films and Film-makers of Denmark, Finland, Iceland, Norway, and Sweden.
- Goble, Alan. The Complete Index to Literary Sources in Film. Walter de Gruyter, 1999.
- Steene, Birgitta. Ingmar Bergman: A Reference Guide. Amsterdam University Press, 2005.
