= John Botvid =

Swedish actor

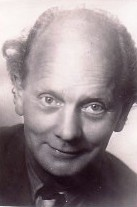
- Born: 12 September 1889; Gothenburg, Sweden
- Died: 20 February 1964 (aged 74); Stockholm, Sweden
- Occupations: Actor; Comedian
- Years active: 1917–1955

John Botvid (12 September 1889 – 20 February 1964) was a Swedish actor and comedian.

== Biography ==
John Botvid Börjesson was born at Gothenburg, Sweden. Botvid debuted as a film actor in 1917. He was frequently featured on the movie screen during the 1930s, 40s and 50s. He appeared in over a hundred films between 1917 and 1955. He often worked with fellow comedians Thor Modéen and Nils Poppe.

In 1945, he married actress Marianne Gyllenhammar (1891–1979). His children were film actors Rolf Botvid (born 1915) and Gerd Botvid (born 1918).

== Selected filmography ==
- Revelj (1917)
- Löjtnant Galenpanna (1917)
- Nattliga toner (1918)
- Hon eller ingen (1934)
- The Family Secret (1936)
- Hotel Paradise (1937)
- Witches' Night (1937)
- Just a Bugler (1938)
- Landstormens lilla Lotta (1939)
- Swing it, magistern! (1940)
- A Real Man (1940)
- Kiss Her! (1940)
- Med dej i mina armar (1940)
- Heroes in Yellow and Blue (1940)
- The Crazy Family (1940)
- Bright Prospects (1941)
- Fransson the Terrible (1941)
- Magistrarna på sommarlov (1941)
- The Train Leaves at Nine (1941)
- Lucky Young Lady (1941)
- The Ghost Reporter (1941)
- Tre glada tokar (1942)
- We House Slaves (1942)
- Little Napoleon (1943)
- I Killed (1943)
- In Darkest Smaland (1943)
- The Green Lift (1944)
- Dolly Takes a Chance (1944)
- Lilla helgonet (1945)
- Maria of Kvarngarden (1945)
- Blåjackor (1945)
- The Österman Brothers' Virago (1945)
- Ballongen (1946)
- Evening at the Djurgarden (1946)
- Between Brothers (1946)
- Wedding Night (1947)
- Love Goes Up and Down (1948)
- Life at Forsbyholm Manor (1948)
- Greven från gränden (1949)
- Playing Truant (1949)
- Teacher's First Born (1950)
- Andersson's Kalle (1950)
- My Name Is Puck (1951)
- Sköna Helena (1951)
- Bom the Flyer (1952)
- The Green Lift (1952)
- One Fiancée at a Time (1952)
- Classmates (1952)
- Åsa-Nisse on Holiday (1953)
- Dance on Roses (1954)
- Darling of Mine (1955)
- The Magnificent Lie (1955)
