= Witches' Night (1937 film) =

1937 film

- Directed by: Schamyl Bauman
- Written by: Oscar Hemberg
- Starring: Gösta Ekman; Signe Hasso; Ruth Stevens
- Cinematography: Willy Goldberger
- Edited by: Rolf Husberg
- Music by: Olof Thiel
- Production company: Irefilm
- Distributed by: Irefilm
- Release date: 1 November 1937
- Running time: 81 minutes
- Country: Sweden
- Language: Swedish

Witches' Night (Swedish: Häxnatten) is a 1937 Swedish drama film directed by Schamyl Bauman and starring Gösta Ekman, Signe Hasso and Ruth Stevens. The film's sets were designed by the Austrian art director Erwin Scharf.

== Synopsis ==
A teacher and poet is much missed when he leaves a school to get married, particularly by one of the students Majken. Five years later she encounters him again.

== Cast ==
- Gösta Ekman as Arne Markell
- Signe Hasso as Majken Celsing
- Ruth Stevens as Lena Markell
- Göran Bernhard as Gunnar Markell
- Sture Lagerwall as Balalajkan
- Einar Axelsson as Bengt Arktander
- Eric Abrahamsson as Mr. Olsson
- Gerda Björne as Mrs. Olsson
- Märtha Lindlöf as Grandmother
- Aurore Palmgren as Sidonia
- Margareta Bergfeldt as Anna
- Kurt Björkvall as Self
- John Botvid as Prison guard
- Märta Dorff as Student
- Gustaf Färingborg as Journalist
- Sigge Fürst as Policeman
- Mona Geijer-Falkner as Cleaning lady
- Torsten Hillberg as Night porter
- Axel Högel as Prison guard
- Nils Johannisson as Sörenson
- Saga Sjöberg as Student
- Inga-Lill Åhström as Greta

== Bibliography ==
- Gustafsson, Fredrik. The Man from the Third Row: Hasse Ekman, Swedish Cinema and the Long Shadow of Ingmar Bergman. Berghahn Books, 2016.
