= Karl-Arne Holmsten =

Swedish actor

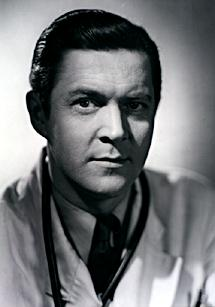
- Born: 14 August 1911; Uppsala, Sweden
- Died: 22 February 1995 (aged 83); Lidingö, Sweden
- Occupation: Actor
- Years active: 1938-1983

Karl-Arne Holmsten (14 August 1911 – 22 February 1995) was a Swedish film actor. He appeared in more than 80 films between 1938 and 1968. He was born in Uppsala, Sweden and died in Lidingö, Sweden.

== Selected filmography ==
- Emilie Högquist (1939)
- Bashful Anton (1940)
- Frestelse (1940)
- Hanna in Society (1940)
- A Sailor on Horseback (1940)
- Lucky Young Lady (1941)
- Magistrarna på sommarlov (1941)
- We House Slaves (1942)
- A Girl for Me (1943)
- Life and Death (1943)
- Men of the Navy (1943)
- Som folk är mest (1944)
- The Green Lift (1944)
- Dolly Takes a Chance (1944)
- The Emperor of Portugallia (1944)
- The Invisible Wall (1944)
- Blåjackor (1945)
- Vandring med månen (1945)
- Don't Give Up (1947)
- The Bride Came Through the Ceiling (1947)
- Neglected by His Wife (1947)
- Love Wins Out (1949)
- Dangerous Spring (1949)
- Woman in White (1949)
- Girl with Hyacinths (1950)
- The Kiss on the Cruise (1950)
- Fiancée for Hire (1950)
- Customs Officer Bom (1951)
- My Name Is Puck (1951)
- Secrets of Women (1952)
- U-Boat 39 (1952)
- Say It with Flowers (1952)
- One Fiancée at a Time (1952)
- Classmates (1952)
- Resan till dej (1953)
- Dance on Roses (1954)
- The Yellow Squadron (1954)
- Laugh Bomb (1954)
- The Light from Lund (1955)
- Darling of Mine (1955)
- My Passionate Longing (1956)
- Mother Takes a Vacation (1957)
- The Lady in Black (1958)
- Mannequin in Red (1958)
- We at Väddö (1958)
- Fridolf Stands Up! (1958)
- Swinging at the Castle (1959)
- Only a Waiter (1959)
- Crime in Paradise (1959)
- Rider in Blue (1959)
- When Darkness Falls (1960)
- Summer and Sinners (1960)
- Lovely Is the Summer Night (1961)
- The Lady in White (1962)
- Den gula bilen (1963)
- Här kommer bärsärkarna (1965)
- Niklasons (1965) (TV Series)
- Öbergs på Lillöga (1983) (TV Series)
