= Barbro Kollberg =

Swedish actress

Barbro Kollberg-Hildestrand
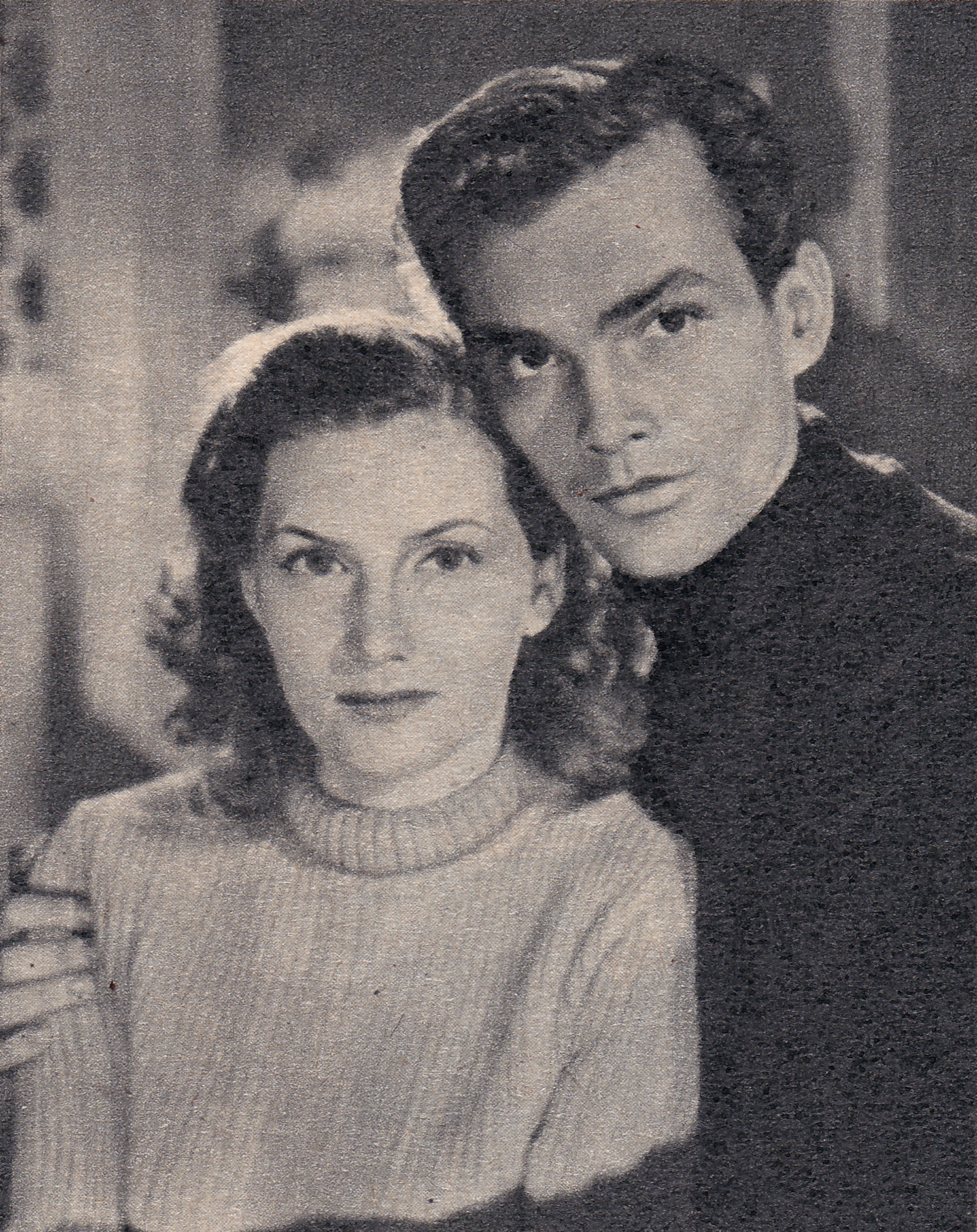
- Kollberg with Birger Malmsten in 1957
- Born: Barbro Anna Elisabet Kollberg; 27 December 1917; Eskilstuna, Sweden
- Died: 6 March 2014 (aged 96)
- Occupation: Actress
- Years active: 1939–2006

Barbro Kollberg (27 December 1917 – 6 March 2014) was a Swedish film actress. Born in Eskilstuna, Södermanlands län, Sweden, she starred in Ingmar Bergman's 1946 It Rains on Our Love. She lived to be 96.

== Selected filmography ==
- Life Begins Today (1939)
- Heroes in Yellow and Blue (1940)
- A Real Man (1940)
- Home from Babylon (1941)
- Tonight or Never (1941)
- The Yellow Clinic (1942)
- Kungsgatan (1943)
- Som folk är mest (1944)
- It Rains on Our Love (1946)
- The Nuthouse (1951)
- Den gula bilen (1963)
- Mor gifter sig (1979) (TV Series)
- The Best Intentions (1991) (TV Series)
- Första Kärleken (1992) (Miniseries)
- A Life for the Taking (1995)
- As It Is in Heaven (2004)
