= Ludde Gentzel =

Swedish actor

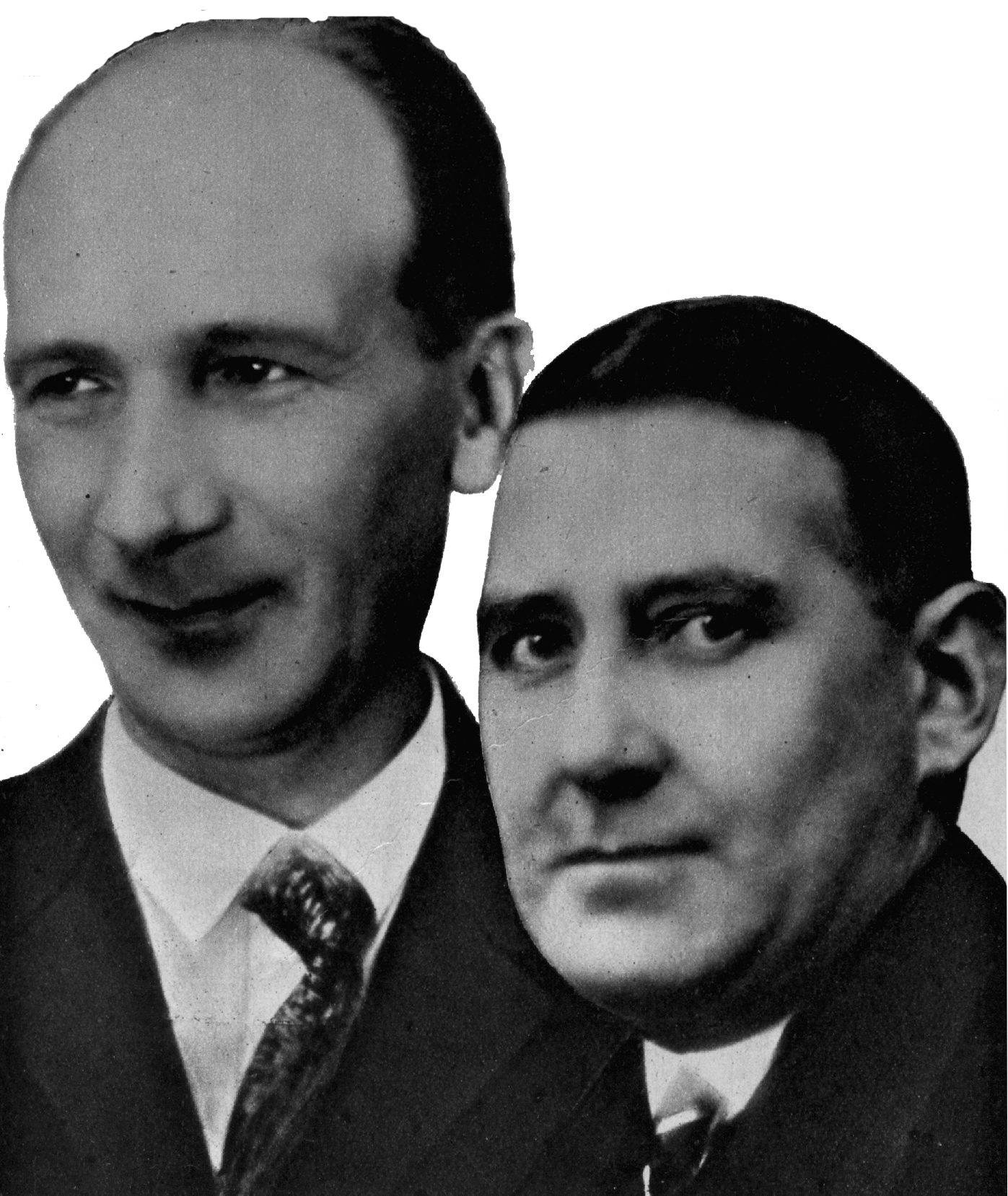
- Gentzel (left) with Rulle Bohman in 1931
- Born: 17 January 1885; Jönköping, Sweden
- Died: 5 March 1963 (aged 78); Gothenburg, Sweden
- Occupation: Actor
- Years active: 1916-1955

Ludde Gentzel (17 January 1885 – 5 March 1963) was a Swedish film actor and singer. He appeared in more than 30 films between 1916 and 1955. As an actor, Gentzel often worked with fellow comedian Eric Abrahamsson.

== Selected filmography ==
- Ship Ahoy! (1931)
- Adventure in Pyjamas (1935)
- Styrman Karlssons flammor (1938)
- Sun Over Sweden (1938)
- Career (1938)
- Good Friends and Faithful Neighbours (1938)
- The Word (1943)
- We Need Each Other (1944)
- Dolly Takes a Chance (1944)
- Oss tjuvar emellan eller En burk ananas (1945)
- It Rains on Our Love (1946)
- When the Meadows Blossom (1946)
- Robinson in Roslagen (1948)
