= Life Begins Today =

1939 film

- Directed by: Schamyl Bauman
- Written by: Oscar Hemberg; Schamyl Bauman
- Based on: Pétrus by Marcel Achard
- Produced by: Arthur Spjuth
- Starring: Sture Lagerwall; Sonja Wigert; Nils Ohlin
- Cinematography: Hilmer Ekdahl
- Music by: Sune Waldimir
- Production company: Sandrew-Bauman
- Distributed by: Sandrew-Baumanfilm
- Release date: 15 August 1939
- Running time: 113 minutes
- Country: Sweden
- Language: Swedish

Life Begins Today (Swedish: I dag börjar livet) is a 1939 Swedish drama film directed by Schamyl Bauman and starring Sture Lagerwall, Sonja Wigert and Nils Ohlin. It was shot at the Centrumateljéerna Studios in Stockholm. The film's sets were designed by the art director Arthur Spjuth. It is based on the 1933 play Pétrus by the French writer Marcel Achard.

== Synopsis ==
Wera Holm, a ballerina, waits outside an apartment block with a pistol waiting for the womanising choreographer who has now dropped her for one of the other dancers. She takes two shots at him, misses, and then dives into a nearby apartment of the artist Petrus Sommar. When the choreographer turns up dead, it appears there is someone else who has reason to kill him.

== Cast ==
- Sture Lagerwall as Petrus Sommar, målare
- Sonja Wigert as Wera Holm, dansös
- Nils Ohlin as Börje Fredin, balettmästare
- Margareta Bergfeldt as Karin, Petrus syster
- Dagmar Ebbesen as Moster Johanna
- Axel Högel as Morbror Karl
- Barbro Kollberg as Nelly, balettflicka
- Ziri-Gun Eriksson as Margot, balettflicka
- Ingrid Borthen as Dittan, balettflicka
- Nils Johannisson as Stålhagen, detektiv
- Ivar Kåge as Kriminalchefen
- Olga Appellöf as Polissystern
- Naemi Briese as Modell
- Ernst Brunman as Polisen vid skrivmaskinen
- Erland Colliander as Bartendern
- Greta Ericson as Lola
- Hartwig Fock as Poliskonstapel Österberg
- Lillebil Kjellén as Balettdansös
- Eivor Landström as Kvinnan som söker modelljobb
- Arne Lindblad as Pianisten
- Gerd Mårtensson as Balettdansös
- John Norrman as Polis
- Hanny Schedin as Servitris

== Bibliography ==
- Qvist, Per Olov & von Bagh, Peter. Guide to the Cinema of Sweden and Finland. Greenwood Publishing Group, 2000.
