= Niklasons =

- Created by: Lars Björkman, Ove Magnusson
- Directed by: Hasse Ekman
- Starring: Karl-Arne Holmsten; Sickan Carlsson
- Country of origin: Sweden
- Original language: Swedish
- No. of seasons: 1
- No. of episodes: 10

Production
- Running time: ~28 min

Original release
- Release: September 4 – November 6, 1965

Niklasons is a Swedish TV series in 10 28-minute episodes from 1965. The script for the series was written by Lars Björkman and Ove Magnusson. The series was directed by Hasse Ekman. Several popular Swedish actors and comedians make guest appearances on the show, among others: Kar de Mumma, Rolf Bengtsson, Lena Söderblom, Gösta Bernhard, Gunnel Broström, Sten Ardenstam, Inga Gill, Gösta Ekman, Siv Ericks, Olof Thunberg, Christina Schollin, Sven Lindberg as well as Hasse Ekman himself.

== Cast ==
- Bengt Niklason - Karl-Arne Holmsten
- Elisabeth Niklason - Sickan Carlsson
- Monica Niklason - Ulla Neumann
- Lasse Niklason - Christian Peters
- Harry Njutgärde - Fredrik Ohlsson
- Maj Njutgärde - Lissi Alandh
- Tommy Njutgärde - Peter Thelin
