= Gull Natorp =

Swedish actress (1880–1962)

- Natorp in 1911
- Born: 10 January 1880; Stockholm, Sweden
- Died: 30 April 1962 (aged 82); Stockholm, Sweden
- Occupation: Actress
- Years active: 1913-1956

Gull Natorp (10 January 1880 – 30 April 1962) was a Swedish film actress. She appeared in more than 70 films between 1913 and 1956.

== Selected filmography ==
- Skottet (1914) - Maid
- Hans hustrus förflutna (1915) - Countess Flemming
- Erotikon (1920) - Spectator at the Opera
- A Fortune Hunter (1921) - Mrs. Margarete Grijp
- A Wild Bird (1921) - Guest
- Thomas Graal's Ward (1922) - Lady with piano
- Kalle Utter (1925) - Prostinna
- A Perfect Gentleman (1927)
- Frida's Songs (1930) - Post clerk (uncredited)
- Markurells i Wadköping (1931) - Member of the board (uncredited)
- What Do Men Know? (1933) - Mrs. Holm
- En stilla flirt (1934) - Mrs. Wilder (uncredited)
- Kärlek efter noter (1935) - Mrs. Tranman
- Kungen kommer (1936) - Adele Löwencreutz
- Pappas pojke (1937) - Mrs. Fanny Hellman
- Du gamla du fria! (1938) - Ellen
- Då länkarna smiddes (1939) - Anna Björnberg, hans hustru
- Between Us Barons (1939) - Tant Victoria
- The Bjorck Family (1940) - Tant Inga
- Snurriga familjen (1940) - Mrs. Augusta Welander (uncredited)
- A Real Man (1940) - Mrs. Betty Bergström
- Bright Prospects (1941) - Mrs. Norrman
- Nygifta (1941) - Mrs. Gunersen
- How to Tame a Real Man (1941) - Miss Beate-Sophie Gripclou
- Lärarinna på vift (1941) - Miss Bruuhn
- Hem från Babylon (1941) - Britta's mother (uncredited)
- The Yellow Clinic (1942) - Nurse Dagmar
- Rospiggar (1942) - Stava, hans hustru
- Adventurer (1942) - Helena Daa
- Ombyte av tåg (1943) - Rut Lundell, Kim's Mother (uncredited)
- Flickan är ett fynd (1943) - Wilhelmina Fogelström
- Little Napoleon (1943) - Aunt Anna
- Life and Death (1943) - Mrs. Lewen
- A Girl for Me (1943) - Lord Mayoress
- I dag gifter sig min man (1943) - Aunt Ottilia
- In Darkest Smaland (1943) - Kristin
- Life in the Country (1943) - Mrs. Berger
- Skipper Jansson (1944) - Mrs. Westerlund
- The Girl and the Devil (1944) - Woman Being Forced to Buy a Skirt
- Prince Gustaf (1944) - Malla Silverstolpe
- Fram för lilla Märta eller På livets ödesvägar (1945) - Borgmästarinnan Granlund född Riddarsporre
- Rattens musketörer (1945) - Martha Berg
- 13 stolar (1945) - Hostess
- Kristin Commands (1946) - Hanna - Deaf Lady (uncredited)
- Saltstänk och krutgubbar (1946) - Johanna
- Iris and the Lieutenant (1946) - Mrs. Asp
- Dynamite (1947) - Dean's Wife
- The Girl from the Marsh Croft (1947) - Fortuneteller (uncredited)
- En fluga gör ingen sommar (1947) - Fru Andersson
- Crime in the Sun (1947) - Cleaning Lady (uncredited)
- Får jag lov, magistern! (1947) - Mrs. Pilgård
- Var sin väg (1948) - Gabrielle Collin
- Med kärlek och solsken och sång (1948) - Woman of Morality
- A Swedish Tiger (1948) - Klara
- Robinson in Roslagen (1948) - Katrina
- The Devil and the Smalander (1949) - Gustava
- Playing Truant (1949) - Mrs. Agda Carlsson
- The Swedish Horseman (1949) - Countess Gyllencrona
- Teacher's First Born (1950) - Betty Mosch
- Fiancée for Hire (1950) - Countess Rosenskiöld
- The White Cat (1950) - Otti Patkull
- One Fiancée at a Time (1952) - Fru Stockman
- The Firebird (1952) - Tilda
- Unmarried Mothers (1953) - Elna, Inga's Supervisor
- The Girl from Backafall (1953) - Vicar's wife (uncredited)
- The Shadow (1953) - Woman
- Kungen av Dalarna (1953) - Katarina
- Dance, My Doll (1953) - Mrs. Uggla
- Our Father and the Gypsy (1954) - Rakel Demant
- En karl i köket (1954) - Mrs. X
- Uncle's (1955) - Landlady
- Whoops! (1955) - Beda
- Getting Married (1955) - Colonel's wife (uncredited)
- Smiles of a Summer Night (1955) - Malla
- The Stranger from the Sky (1956) - Actress
- Stage Entrance (1956) - Woman (uncredited)
