= Bengt Idestam-Almquist =

Swedish screenwriter (1895–1983)

- Born: 9 September 1895; Turku, Grand Duchy of Finland
- Died: 16 September 1983 (aged 88); Enskededalen, Sweden
- Occupations: Film critic Screenwriter
- Years active: 1923-1965

Bengt Idestam-Almquist (9 September 1895 – 16 September 1983) was a Swedish screenwriter, critic and film historian. The Swedish Film Institute calls him the "father of Swedish film criticism". At the 3rd Guldbagge Awards he won a Special Achievement award. He was a member of the jury at the 15th Venice International Film Festival in 1954.

Idestam-Almquist, who was the son of a Riksvensk father and a Swedish-speaking Finn mother, was born in Turku, Finland, and grew up in Saint Petersburg, Russian Empire. He later fled to Sweden with his family during the February Revolution and studied art history in Uppsala. His fascination with film came after watching a silent film with a benshi while serving the Red Cross in Asia. He was the first cousin of Dag Hammarskjöld.

He was awarded the Illis quorum in 1983.

== Selected filmography ==
- A Crime (1940)
- A Real Man (1940)
- The Three of Us (1940)
- Life Goes On (1941)
- The Poor Millionaire (1941)
