= The Teachers on Summer Vacation =

- Directed by: Schamyl Bauman
- Written by: Hasse Ekman
- Starring: Alice Babs
- Cinematography: Hilmer Ekdahl
- Edited by: Rolf Husberg
- Music by: Thore Ehrling; Kai Gullmar; Ivan Söderberg
- Release date: 25 December 1941 (Sweden)
- Running time: 85 minutes
- Country: Sweden
- Language: Swedish

The Teachers on Summer Vacation (Swedish: Magistrarna på sommarlov) is a Swedish film which was released to cinemas in Sweden on 22 November 1941, directed by Schamyl Bauman and starring Alice Babs.

== Cast ==
- Alice Babs
- Karl-Arne Holmsten
- Thor Modéen
- Carl Hagman
- Viran Rydkvist
- John Botvid
- Dagmar Ebbesen
- Marianne Aminoff
- Åke Johansson
- Åke Engfeldt
- Linnéa Hillberg
- Einar Axelsson
- Yngve Nyqvist
- Inger Sundberg
- Birthe Holmberg

== Awards and honours ==
- Schamyl Bauman won a commendation at the 1941 Venice Film Festival for Swing it, magistern! and Teachers on Summer Vacation.
