= We at Väddö =

1958 Swedish drama film

- Directed by: Arthur Spjuth
- Written by: Per Kellberg; Arthur Spjuth
- Produced by: Rune Waldekranz
- Starring: Ann-Marie Gyllenspetz; Bengt Brunskog; Karl-Arne Holmsten
- Cinematography: Rune Ericson
- Edited by: Lennart Wallén
- Music by: Ulf Peder Olrog
- Production company: Sandrews
- Distributed by: Sandrews
- Release date: 13 October 1958
- Running time: 112 minutes
- Country: Sweden
- Language: Swedish

We at Väddö (Swedish: Vi på Väddö) is a 1958 Swedish drama film directed by Arthur Spjuth and starring Ann-Marie Gyllenspetz, Bengt Brunskog and Karl-Arne Holmsten. It was shot at the Centrumateljéerna Studios in Stockholm. The film's sets were designed by the art director Bibi Lindström.

== Cast ==
- Ann-Marie Gyllenspetz as Ylva Markner
- Bengt Brunskog as Frans Sundberg
- Karl-Arne Holmsten as Bengt Wollinder
- Ittla Frodi as Olivia Nilsson
- John Elfström as Eiland Johnsson
- Erik Strandmark as Ströms-Janne
- Nils Hallberg as Conny Nelson
- Rut Holm as Agda Mattsson
- Keve Hjelm as Daniel Sundberg
- Inga Landgré as Berit Sundberg
- Axel Högel as Östen Larsson
- Einar Axelsson as Blom
- Arthur Fischer as Shop Keeper Pettersson
- Siegfried Fischer as Leonard Larsson
- Stig Johanson as Janitor
- Ludde Juberg as Efraim
- Birger Lensander as Fisherman
- Ingemar Pallin as José Strömberg
- Bellan Roos as Mrs. Pettersson
- Birger Åsander as Fisherman

== Bibliography ==
- Qvist, Per Olov & von Bagh, Peter. Guide to the Cinema of Sweden and Finland. Greenwood Publishing Group, 2000.
