= Axel Högel =

Swedish actor

- Högel in costume in 1908
- Born: Axel Erik Högel; 23 March 1884; Stockholm, Sweden-Norway
- Died: 20 September 1970 (aged 86); Stockholm, Sweden
- Occupation: Actor
- Years active: 1920-1961 (film)

Axel Erik Högel (23 March 1884 – 20 September 1970) was a Swedish stage and film actor. He was a prolific character actor in the theatre and in Swedish cinema.

== Selected filmography ==
- Johan Ulfstjerna (1923)
- Ingmar's Inheritance (1925)
- Kanske en gentleman (1935)
- Witches' Night (1937)
- Dollar (1938)
- Comrades in Uniform (1938)
- Life Begins Today (1939)
- The Two of Us (1939)
- Her Little Majesty (1939)
- The Three of Us (1940)
- If I Could Marry the Minister (1941)
- The Ghost Reporter (1941)
- Ride Tonight! (1942)
- The Case of Ingegerd Bremssen (1942)
- Little Napoleon (1943)
- The Brothers' Woman (1943)
- The Emperor of Portugallia (1944)
- I Am Fire and Air (1944)
- Turn of the Century (1944)
- Barnen från Frostmofjället (1945)
- Maria of Kvarngarden (1945)
- Black Roses (1945)
- Desire (1946)
- The Bells of the Old Town (1946)
- Rail Workers (1947)
- Life in the Finnish Woods (1947)
- Lars Hård (1948)
- Each Heart Has Its Own Story (1948)
- Sven Tusan (1949)
- Son of the Sea (1949)
- Big Lasse of Delsbo (1949)
- When Love Came to the Village (1950)
- Teacher's First Born (1950)
- My Sister and I (1950)
- One Summer of Happiness (1951)
- U-Boat 39 (1952)
- The Green Lift (1952)
- The Clang of the Pick (1952)
- Love (1952)
- For the Sake of My Intemperate Youth (1952)
- No Man's Woman (1953)
- Dance on Roses (1954)
- Our Father and the Gypsy (1954)
- Simon the Sinner (1954)
- Sir Arne's Treasure (1954)
- Storm over Tjurö (1954)
- Darling of Mine (1955)
- A Doll's House (1956)
- Night Child (1956)
- The Great Amateur (1958)
- We at Väddö (1958)

== Bibliography ==
- Kwiatkowski, Aleksander (1983-01-01). Swedish Film Classics: A Pictorial Survey of 25 Films from 1913 to 1957. Courier Corporation. ISBN 978-0-486-24304-7.
- Steene, Birgitta. Ingmar Bergman: A Reference Guide. Amsterdam University Press, 2005.
