= Signe Lundberg-Settergren =

Swedish actress

- Born: Signe Maria Elisabet Lundberg; 15 February 1882; Viborg, Grand Duchy of Finland
- Died: 24 June 1967 (aged 85); Stockholm, Sweden
- Occupation: Actress
- Years active: 1932-1958 (film)
- Parent: Alfred Lundberg

Signe Lundberg-Settergren (15 February 1882 – 14 June 1967) was a Swedish stage and film actress. She was born in the Grand Duchy of Finland to Swedish parents, including her father the actor and theatre director Alfred Lundberg. She made her theatrical debut in 1900 and first appeared on screen in 1932, appearing as a character actress over the following quarter of a century. Her sister Hedvig Lindby was also an actress.

== Selected filmography ==
- International Match (1932)
- Love and Dynamite (1933)
- Boman's Boy (1933)
- Synnöve Solbakken (1934)
- Andersson's Kalle (1934)
- The Marriage Game (1935)
- A Woman's Face (1938)
- Career (1938)
- The Three of Us (1940)
- The Train Leaves at Nine (1941)
- Ride Tonight! (1942)
- Motherhood (1945)
- Black Roses (1945)
- Neglected by His Wife (1947)
- I Am with You (1948)
- Playing Truant (1949)
- Miss Julie (1951)
- All the World's Delights (1953)
- Encounters in the Twilight (1957)

== Bibliography ==
- Kwiatkowski, Aleksander. Swedish Film Classics: A Pictorial Survey of 25 Films from 1913 to 1957. Courier Dover Publications, 1983.
