= John Harryson =

Swedish actor

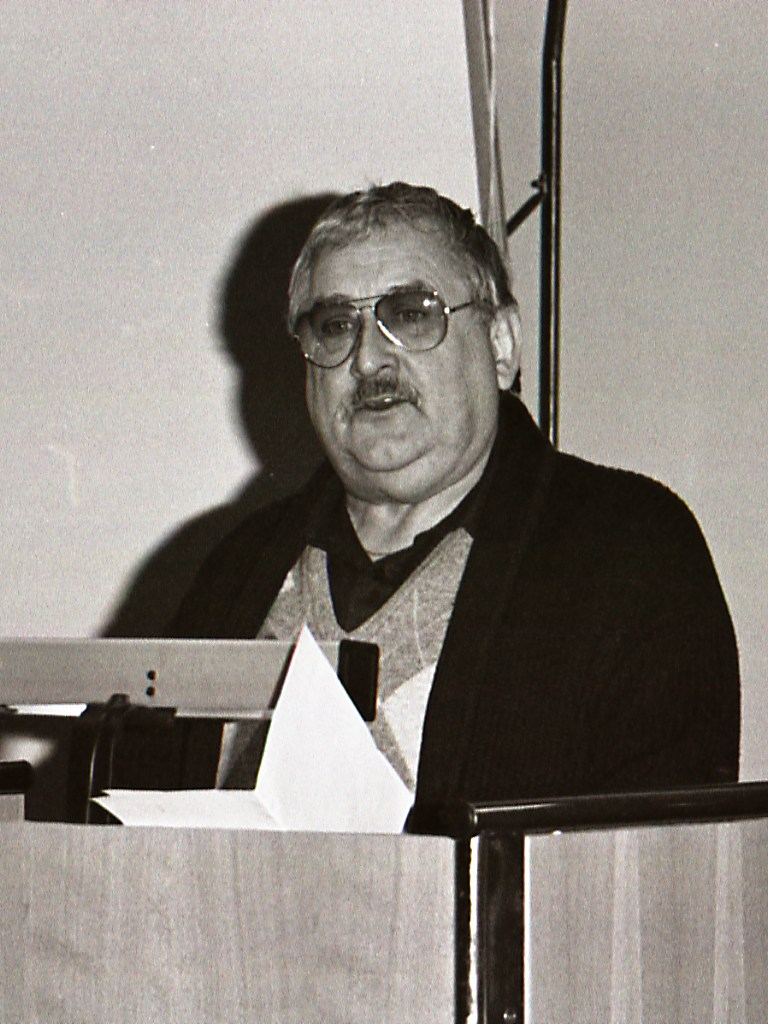
- Harryson in 1986.
- Born: John Edvard Harryson; 17 April 1926; Katrineholm, Sweden
- Died: 28 November 2008 (aged 82); Stockholm, Sweden
- Occupations: Actor, voice actor, singer
- Years active: 1946–2002
- Spouse: Kajsa Hultare (m. 1955; died 2003)
- Partner: Ulla-Britt Dahl
- Children: 4, including Peter Harryson (with Dahl)

John Edvard Harryson (17 April 1926 – 28 November 2008) was a Swedish actor. He was the father of famous Swedish actor and television host Peter Harryson.

Born in Katrineholm, Harrysson was a renowned actor in Sweden. For a younger generation John Harrysson was known as the Swedish voice of Scrooge McDuck, Eeyore in Winnie the Pooh, Doctor Snuggles, Bert in Svenska Sesam (The second Swedish version of Sesame Street), and the Sheriff of Nottingham in Robin Hood (1973).

He was also active as a folk singer and has recorded several albums over the years, including Bondkomikernas viser 1971, Birger Sjöbergs Fridas viser 1978 and poems set to music by Eino Leino 1981. John Harryson is buried in the memorial garden at Kungsholms cemetery.

== Selected filmography ==
- Desire (1946)
- Summer with Monika (1953)
- Voyage in the Night (1955)
- Darling of Mine (1955)
- Andersson's Kalle (1972)
- Woman Doctors (1984)
