= Hilmer Ekdahl =

Swedish cinematographer

- Born: 16 February 1889; Stockholm, Sweden
- Died: 11 October 1967 (aged 78); Stockholm, Sweden
- Occupation: Cinematographer
- Years active: 1920-1953 (film)

Hilmer Ekdahl (1889–1967) was a Swedish cinematographer.

== Selected filmography ==
- A Night of Love by the Öresund (1931)
- House Slaves (1933)
- Eva Goes Aboard (1934)
- Raggen (1936)
- The People of Bergslagen (1937)
- Sun Over Sweden (1938)
- Career (1938)
- Wanted (1939)
- Life Begins Today (1939)
- Her Little Majesty (1939)
- Mot nya tider (1939)
- The Two of Us (1939)
- Heroes in Yellow and Blue (1940)
- The Three of Us (1940)
- A Real Man (1940)
- Magistrarna på sommarlov (1941)
- The Ghost Reporter (1941)
- We House Slaves (1942)
- The Girls in Smaland (1945)
- Sin (1948)
- My Sister and I (1950)
- The Girl from Backafall (1953)

== Bibliography ==
- Rasmussen, Bjørn. Filmens hvem-vad-hvor: Udenlanske film 1950-1967. Politiken, 1968.
