= Her Little Majesty (1939 film) =

- Directed by: Schamyl Bauman
- Written by: Ragnar Hyltén-Cavallius; Hilding Östlund; Karl Gerhard (play); Hasse Ekman; Ragnar Holmström
- Starring: Joachim Holst-Jensen; Sonja Wigert; Anders Henrikson
- Cinematography: Hilmer Ekdahl
- Music by: Eskil Eckert-Lundin
- Production company: Terrafilm
- Distributed by: Terrafilm
- Release date: 6 October 1939
- Running time: 81 minutes
- Country: Sweden
- Language: Swedish

Her Little Majesty (Swedish: Hennes lilla majestät) is a 1939 Swedish comedy drama film directed by Schamyl Bauman and starring Joachim Holst-Jensen, Sonja Wigert and Anders Henrikson. It was a remake of the 1925 film of the same title. It was shot at the Centrumateljéerna Studios in Stockholm and on location in Oslo. The film's sets were designed by the art director Arthur Spjuth.

== Main cast ==
- Joachim Holst-Jensen as Consul General Hauge
- Sonja Wigert as Marianne, daughter of the Consul
- Anders Henrikson as Vicar Ahlman
- Gösta Cederlund as Doctor Bergfelt
- Carl Barcklind as Bishop Wicander
- Gunnar Höglund as Gunnar
- Aurore Palmgren as Maria
- Julia Cæsar as Augusta
- Carl Deurell as Johan Ljunggren
- Sigge Fürst as a car salesman
- Axel Högel as a car repairman
- Anna Olin as Mrs. Lindblom

== Bibliography ==
- Per Olov Qvist & Peter von Bagh. Guide to the Cinema of Sweden and Finland. Greenwood Publishing Group, 2000.
