= Desire (1946 Swedish film) =

1946 film

- Directed by: Edvin Adolphson
- Written by: Edvin Adolphson; Walter Ljungquist
- Based on: Desire by Hans Severinsen
- Produced by: Carl Nelson
- Starring: Edvin Adolphson; Gunn Wållgren; Carl Deurell; Sven Magnusson
- Cinematography: Göran Strindberg
- Edited by: Lennart Wallén
- Music by: Sune Waldimir
- Production company: Monark Film
- Distributed by: Monark Film
- Release date: 2 September 1946
- Running time: 98 minutes
- Country: Sweden
- Language: Swedish

Desire (Swedish: Begär) is a 1946 Swedish drama film directed by and starring Edvin Adolphson and also featuring Gunn Wållgren, Carl Deurell and Sven Magnusson. It was shot at the Centrumateljéerna Studios in Stockholm. The film's sets were designed by the art director Arthur Spjuth.

== Cast ==
- Edvin Adolphson as Carsten Berg
- Carl Deurell as Johannes Berg
- Gunn Wållgren as Ingrid
- Sven Magnusson as Tore Wiborg
- Olof Winnerstrand as Appelgren
- Hilda Borgström as Mrs. Quist
- Axel Högel as Johansson
- Ilse-Nore Tromm as Mrs. Hjorth
- Albert Ståhl as Pettersson
- Åke Claesson as Doctor
- Olav Riégo as District Court Judge
- Erik Forslund as Fröjd
- Inga-Lill Åhström as Nurse
- Hartwig Fock as Customs Clerk
- John Harryson as Office Clerk
- Erland Colliander as Office Clerk
- Hugo Jacobsson as Porter
- Yngve Nyqvist as Mrs. Hjorth's Guest
- Rune Stylander as Chief Physician
- Bellan Roos as Waitress
- Wilma Malmlöf as Dishwasher

== Bibliography ==
- Krawc, Alfred. International Directory of Cinematographers, Set- and Costume Designers in Film: Denmark, Finland, Norway, Sweden (from the beginnings to 1984). Saur, 1986.
