= The Poor Millionaire (1941 film) =

1941 film

- Directed by: Lennart Wallén; Sigurd Wallén
- Written by: Bengt Idestam-Almquist; Alf Jörgensen
- Starring: Stig Järrel; Dagmar Ebbesen; Marianne Aminoff
- Cinematography: Hilding Bladh; Ewert Löfstedt
- Edited by: Lennart Wallén
- Music by: Miff Görling; Sune Östling
- Production company: Sveafilm
- Release date: 26 December 1941
- Running time: 80 minutes
- Country: Sweden
- Language: Swedish

The Poor Millionaire (Swedish: En fattig miljonär) is a 1941 Swedish comedy film directed by Lennart Wallén and Sigurd Wallén and starring Stig Järrel, Dagmar Ebbesen and Marianne Aminoff. The film's sets were designed by the art director Bibi Lindström.

== Cast ==
- Stig Järrel as Nils Holm
- Sigurd Wallén as John Lundgren
- Dagmar Ebbesen as Anna Svensson
- Marianne Aminoff as Gittan Svensson
- Marianne Löfgren as Karin Jönsson
- Geraldine Hislop as Vera Wigo
- Hilding Gavle as Lindgren
- Magnus Kesster as Manager
- Arne Lindblad as Jansson
- Bellan Roos as Old Gossip
- Artur Rolén as Photographer
- Wiktor Andersson as Man in cafe
- Julia Cæsar as Woman in coffee shop
- Betty Bjurström as Coffee shop girl

== Bibliography ==
- Krawc, Alfred. International Directory of Cinematographers, Set- and Costume Designers in Film: Denmark, Finland, Norway, Sweden (from the beginnings to 1984). Saur, 1986.
- Qvist, Per Olov & von Bagh, Peter. Guide to the Cinema of Sweden and Finland. Greenwood Publishing Group, 2000.
- Wredlund, Bertil. Långfilm i Sverige: 1940-1949. Proprius, 1981.
