= Prince Gustaf (film) =

1944 film

- Directed by: Schamyl Bauman
- Written by: Thorsten Eklann; Marita Lindgren-Fridell
- Starring: Alf Kjellin; Mai Zetterling; Lennart Bernadotte; Hilda Borgström
- Cinematography: Göran Strindberg
- Edited by: Lennart Wallén
- Music by: Gunnar Johansson
- Production company: S. Bauman-Produktion
- Distributed by: Sandrew-Baumanfilm AB
- Release date: 29 November 1944
- Running time: 109 minutes
- Country: Sweden
- Language: Swedish

Prince Gustaf (Swedish: Prins Gustaf) is a 1944 Swedish historical film directed by Schamyl Bauman and starring Alf Kjellin, Mai Zetterling and Lennart Bernadotte. The film portrays the life of Prince Gustav, Duke of Uppland, a member of the Nineteenth Century Swedish royal family who composed a number of celebrated songs. It was shot at the Centrumateljéerna Studios in Stockholm. The film's sets were designed by the art director Bibi Lindström.

== Main cast ==
- Alf Kjellin as Prince Gustaf
- Mai Zetterling as Anna Maria Wastenius
- Lennart Bernadotte as Crown Prince Carl
- Erik 'Bullen' Berglund as Liljegren
- Hilda Borgström as Matilda
- Ragnar Arvedson as Henning Hamilton
- Carl-Axel Hallgren as Teacher
- Folke Rydberg as Glunten
- Gunnar Sjöberg as Carl Nyraeus
- Rune Stylander as Björkander
- Kolbjörn Knudsen as Oscar I
- Anne-Marie Eek as Princess Eugenie
- Ruth Kasdan as Ida
- Gull Natorp as Malla Silverstolpe
- Carl Barcklind as Vicar Wastenius

== Bibliography ==
- Olov Qvist, Per & von Bagh, Peter. Guide to the Cinema of Sweden and Finland. Greenwood Publishing Group, 2000.
