= Hilding Bladh =

Swedish cinematographer

- Born: 25 December 1906; Stockholm, Sweden
- Died: 6 July 1982 (aged 75); Stockholm, Sweden
- Occupation: Cinematographer
- Years active: 1934-1965 (film)

Hilding Bladh (25 December 1906–6 July 1982) was a Swedish cinematographer. He worked on around 90 film productions initially as a camera assistant before graduating to director of photography. He worked several times with director Ingmar Bergman.

== Selected filmography ==
- Close Relations (1935)
- A Crime (1940)
- A Real Man (1940)
- Life Goes On (1941)
- The Poor Millionaire (1941)
- Woman on Board (1941)
- Sonja (1943)
- The Sixth Shot (1943)
- We Need Each Other (1944)
- The Girl and the Devil (1944)
- His Excellency (1944)
- Fram för lilla Märta (1945)
- Interlude (1946)
- It Rains on Our Love (1946)
- Neglected by His Wife (1947)
- No Way Back (1947)
- Carnival Evening (1948)
- Son of the Sea (1949)
- Playing Truant (1949)
- My Sister and I (1950)
- The Motor Cavaliers (1950)
- Teacher's First Born (1950)
- My Name Is Puck (1951)
- One Fiancée at a Time (1952)
- All the World's Delights (1953)
- Sawdust and Tinsel (1953)
- Ursula, the Girl from the Finnish Forests (1953)
- Enchanted Walk (1954)
- Dreams (1955)
- Whoops! (1955)
- Musik ombord (1958)
- Space Invasion of Lapland (1959)
- Rider in Blue (1959)
- The Lady in White (1962)

== Bibliography ==
- Steene, Birgitta. Ingmar Bergman: A Reference Guide. Amsterdam University Press, 2005.
