= Arthur Spjuth =

Swedish art director and filmmaker

- Born: 1 May 1904; Stockholm, Sweden
- Died: 20 October 1989 (aged 85); Stockholm, Sweden
- Occupations: Art director, Producer, Director, Screenwriter
- Years active: 1938–1958 (film)

Arthur Spjuth (1904–1989) was a Swedish art director who designed film sets for many Swedish productions. He also directed five films and worked as a screenwriter on seven and a producer on two, as well as production manager on many others.

== Selected filmography ==
- Comrades in Uniform (1938)
- Her Little Majesty (1939)
- Between Us Barons (1939)
- Life Begins Today (1939)
- The Two of Us (1939)
- The Three of Us (1940)
- A Crime (1940)
- The Bjorck Family (1940)
- A Real Man (1940)
- Heroes in Yellow and Blue (1940)
- Life Goes On (1941)
- The Ghost Reporter (1941)
- Little Napoleon (1943)
- The Girls in Smaland (1945)
- The Wedding on Solö (1946)
- Desire (1946)
- No Way Back (1947)
- Song of Stockholm (1947)
- Robinson in Roslagen (1948)
- Playing Truant (1949)
- Bohus Battalion (1949)
- My Sister and I (1950)
- Teacher's First Born (1950)
- My Name Is Puck (1951)
- One Fiancée at a Time (1952)
- Classmates (1952)
- Dance on Roses (1954)
- Darling of Mine (1955)
- The Magnificent Lie (1955)
- Mother Takes a Vacation (1957)
- We at Väddö (1958)

== Bibliography ==
- Krawc, Alfred. International Directory of Cinematographers, Set- and Costume Designers in Film: Denmark, Finland, Norway, Sweden (from the beginnings to 1984). Saur, 1986.
