= Iris and the Lieutenant =

1946 film

- Film poster
- Directed by: Alf Sjöberg
- Written by: Olle Hedberg; Alf Sjöberg
- Produced by: Harald Molander
- Starring: Mai Zetterling
- Release date: 16 December 1946
- Running time: 86 minutes
- Country: Sweden
- Language: Swedish

Iris and the Lieutenant (Swedish: Iris och löjtnantshjärta) is a 1946 Swedish drama film directed by Alf Sjöberg and starring Mai Zetterling, Alf Kjellin and Åke Claesson. The film boosted Zetterling's international profile. Shortly afterwards she moved to Britain to make Frieda (1947).

The film is adapted from a 1934 novel by the same title, written by Olle Hedberg.

== Cast ==
- Mai Zetterling as Iris Mattson, mrs Asp's maid.
- Alf Kjellin as Robert Motander, the lieutenant.
- Åke Claesson as Oscar Motander, Robert's father.
- Holger Löwenadler as Baltzar Motander, Robert's brother.
- Margareta Fahlén as Greta Motander, Baltzar's wife.
- Ingrid Borthen as Malin 'Mary' Wallbeck, Robert's half-sister.
- Einar Axelsson as Frans Wallbeck, Mary's husband.
- Gull Natorp as Ebba Asp, Robert's aunt.
- Stig Järrel as Harald Montander, Robert's cousin.
- Peter Lindgren as Svante Montander, Roberts cousin.
- Magnus Kesster as Emil Gustell.
