= Naemi Briese =

Swedish actress

- Born: 4 March 1908; Stockholm, Sweden
- Died: 20 August 1980 (aged 72); Stockholm, Sweden
- Years active: 1932–1957
- Spouse: Elof Ahrle (m. 1931–1939)

Naemi Briese (4 March 1908 – 20 August 1980) was a Swedish film actress.

== Selected filmography ==
- Jolly Musicians (1932)
- Simon of Backabo (1934)
- Andersson's Kalle (1934)
- Oh, Such a Night! (1937)
- A Cruise in the Albertina (1938)
- Life Begins Today (1939)
- Little Napoleon (1943)
- She Thought It Was Him (1943)
- Motherhood (1945)
- Johansson and Vestman (1946)
- Soldier's Reminder (1947)
- No Way Back (1947)
- The Street (1949)
- The Light from Lund (1955)
- Night Child (1956)

The following films were directed by Ingmar Bergman:

- A Ship to India (1947) – Selma
- Summer with Monika (1953) – Monika's mother
- Sawdust and Tinsel (1953) – Mrs. Meijer, circus artist
