= Mother Takes a Vacation =

1957 film

- Directed by: Schamyl Bauman
- Written by: Schamyl Bauman; Elsa Appelquist; Sven Björkman; Arthur Spjuth
- Produced by: Schamyl Bauman
- Starring: Gerd Hagman; George Fant; Karl-Arne Holmsten
- Cinematography: Göran Strindberg
- Edited by: Carl-Olov Skeppstedt
- Music by: Sune Waldimir
- Production company: Bauman-Produktion
- Distributed by: Sandrew-Baumanfilm
- Release date: 2 August 1957
- Running time: 106 minutes
- Country: Sweden
- Language: Swedish

Mother Takes a Vacation (Swedish: Mamma tar semester) is a 1957 Swedish comedy film directed by Schamyl Bauman and starring Gerd Hagman, George Fant and Karl-Arne Holmsten. It was shot at the Centrumateljéerna Studios in Stockholm. The film's sets were designed by the art director Nils Nilsson.

== Synopsis ==
Sylvia returns to Sweden after several years abroad and is shocked to see how put-upon her sister Karin is by her husband and children, who treat her like a housekeeper. She persuades her to take a vacation with her in Stockholm to live a little and awaken her spouse and children to what she is to the family.

== Cast ==
- Gerd Hagman as Karin Forsberg
- George Fant as Ragnar Forsberg
- Karl-Arne Holmsten as Gunnar Broms
- Gaby Stenberg as Sylvia
- Elsa Carlsson as Elisabeth Broms
- Torsten Lilliecrona as Director Broms
- Stig Järrel as Director Sandell
- Sven Almgren as Lennart Forsberg
- Sten Mattsson as Gunnar Forsberg
- Mona Malm as Gittan Broms
- Rut Holm as Mrs. Jansson
- Bellan Roos as Hilda
- Birgitta Andersson as Young Lady in White Fur
- Sven Arvor as Maitre d'
- Lillemor Biörnstad as Miss Lindkvist
- Astrid Bodin as Sales Clerk
- Jessie Flaws as Kajsa Larsson
- Pierre Fränckel as Sven Leråker
- Nils Hallberg as Karlsson
- Ulf Johansson as Jocke
- Holger Kax as Taxi Driver
- Sonja Kolthoff as Miss Blomkvist
- Gösta Krantz as Bus Driver
- Märta Ottoson as Dinner Guest
- Olav Riégo as Dinner Guest
- Birger Sahlberg as Bus Passenger
- Karl-Erik Stark as Bartender
- Claes Thelander as Dinner Guest

== Bibliography ==
- Per Olov Qvist & Peter von Bagh. Guide to the Cinema of Sweden and Finland. Greenwood Publishing Group, 2000.
