= Heroes in Yellow and Blue =

1940 film

- Directed by: Schamyl Bauman
- Written by: Schamyl Bauman; Hasse Ekman
- Starring: Thor Modéen; Elof Ahrle; Tollie Zellman
- Cinematography: Hilmer Ekdahl
- Edited by: Rolf Husberg
- Music by: Erik Baumann; Gösta Wallenius
- Production company: Bauman-Produktion
- Distributed by: Europa Film
- Release date: 16 February 1940
- Running time: 94 minutes
- Country: Sweden
- Language: Swedish

Heroes in Yellow and Blue (Swedish: Hjältar i gult och blått) is a 1940 Swedish comedy film directed by Schamyl Bauman and starring Thor Modéen, Elof Ahrle and Tollie Zellman. It was shot at the Centrumateljéerna Studios in Stockholm. The film's sets were designed by the art director Arthur Spjuth.

== Cast ==
- Thor Modéen as Thor Emanuelsson
- Elof Ahrle as Loffe Holm
- Tollie Zellman as Fru Delmer
- Barbro Kollberg as Louise, hennes dotter
- Emy Hagman as Ulrika, hembiträde
- Sigge Fürst as 'Dr.' Christian Ronzander
- Arne Lindblad as Amanuens Lundvall
- Gösta Cederlund as Översten
- John Botvid as Gustafsson
- Tord Bernheim as Drunk Conscript
- Gunnar Björnstrand as Sgt. Kristian
- Ernst Brunman as Non-Commissioned Officer
- Gustaf Färingborg as Card Player
- Åke Grönberg as Soldier
- Olle Hilding as Courtroom Clerk
- Torsten Hillberg as Captain
- Ivar Kåge as Judge
- Hilmer Peters as Rulle
- Bellan Roos as Telephone Operator
- Tom Walter as Card Player
- Ragnar Widestedt as Captain Lundin

== Bibliography ==
- Per Olov Qvist & Peter von Bagh. Guide to the Cinema of Sweden and Finland. Greenwood Publishing Group, 2000.
