= Gerd Hagman =

Swedish actress

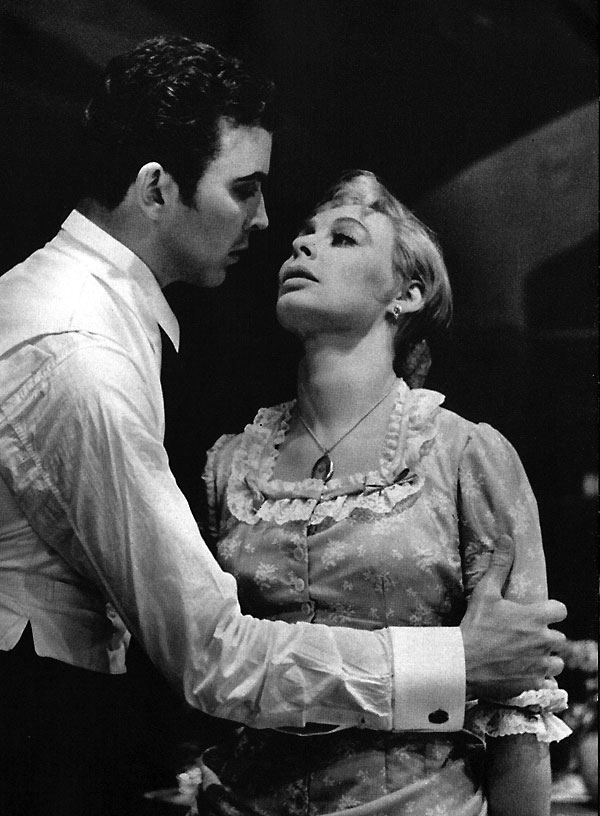
- Hagman with Ove Tjernberg in 1955
- Born: 4 July 1919; Stockholm, Sweden
- Died: 30 November 2011 (aged 92); Sweden
- Occupation: Actress
- Years active: 1940-2007

Gerd Hagman (4 July 1919 – 30 November 2011) was a Swedish actress. She appeared in more than 20 films and television shows between 1940 and 2007.

== Selected filmography ==
- Blossom Time (1940)
- The Fight Continues (1941)
- Home from Babylon (1941)
- Nothing Is Forgotten (1942)
- Ride Tonight! (1942)
- There's a Fire Burning (1943)
- Mother Takes a Vacation (1957)
- Hello Baby (1976)
- Crime in Paradise (1959)
