= Bellan Roos =

Swedish actress

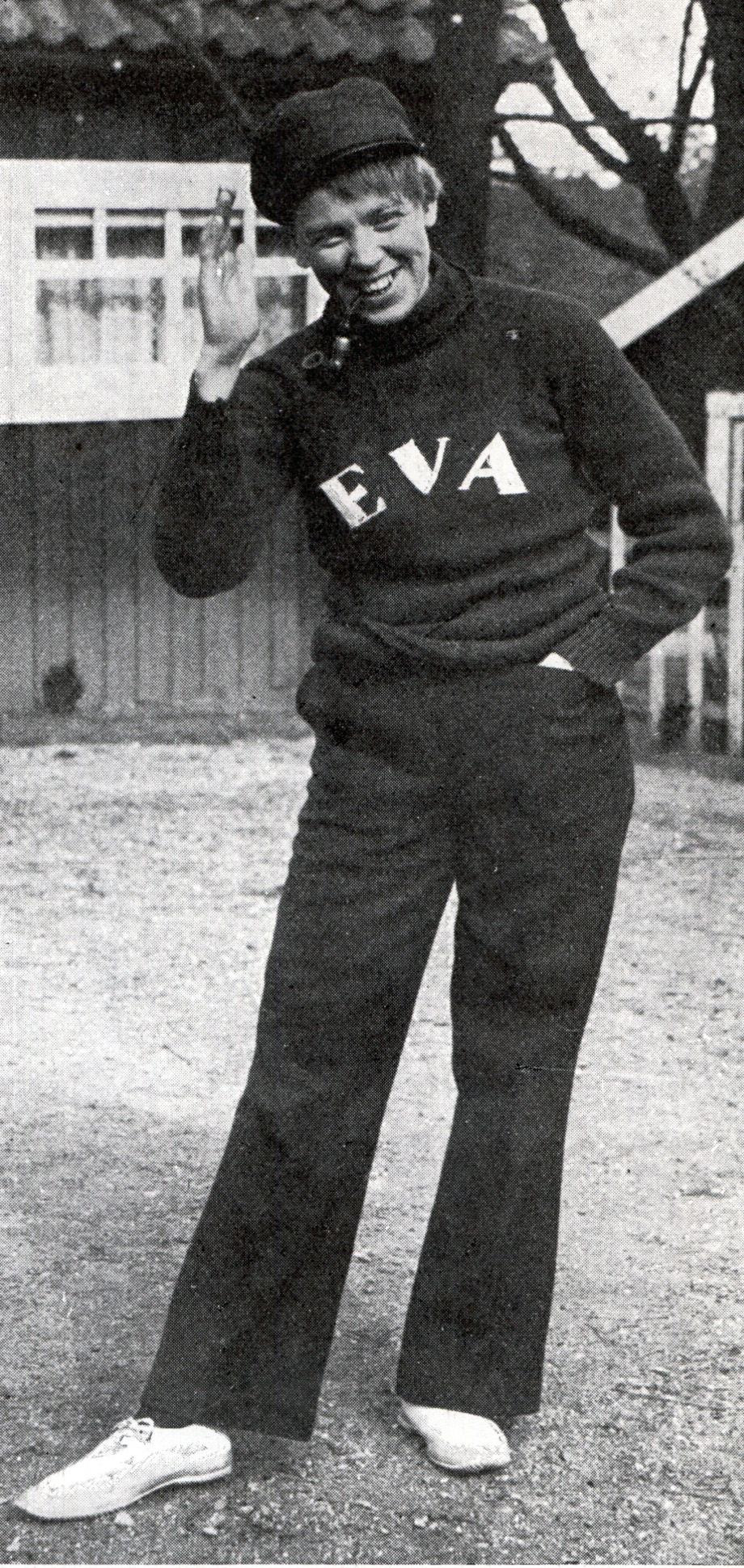
- Roos in 1927
- Born: 25 May 1901; Nynäshamn, Sweden
- Died: 8 April 1990 (aged 88); Stockholm, Sweden
- Occupation: Actress
- Years active: 1933-1979

Bellan Roos (25 May 1901 – 8 April 1990) was a Swedish actress. She appeared in more than 70 films and television shows between 1933 and 1979.

== Selected filmography ==
- Boman's Boy (1933)
- Simon of Backabo (1934)
- Under False Flag (1935)
- Adventure (1936)
- Comrades in Uniform (1938)
- Career (1938)
- Wanted (1939)
- We at Solglantan (1939)
- Kiss Her! (1940)
- Heroes in Yellow and Blue (1940)
- The Three of Us (1940)
- Fransson the Terrible (1941)
- The Ghost Reporter (1941)
- The Poor Millionaire (1941)
- The Yellow Clinic (1942)
- It Is My Music (1942)
- We House Slaves (1942)
- I Am Fire and Air (1944)
- Desire (1946)
- Carnival Evening (1948)
- Big Lasse of Delsbo (1949)
- Andersson's Kalle (1950)
- Teacher's First Born (1950)
- My Sister and I (1950)
- My Name Is Puck (1951)
- Kalle Karlsson of Jularbo (1952)
- Åsa-Nisse on Holiday (1953)
- The Girl from Backafall (1953)
- Seventh Heaven (1956)
- Mother Takes a Vacation (1957)
- Playing on the Rainbow (1958)
- The Great Amateur (1958)
- More Than a Match for the Navy (1958)
- We at Väddö (1958)
- Heaven and Pancake (1959)
- Rider in Blue (1959)
- Heart's Desire (1960)
- Lovely Is the Summer Night (1961)
- Äktenskapsbrottaren (1964)
- Hugo and Josephine (1967)
- The Man on the Roof (1976)
