= Darling of Mine =

1955 film

- Directed by: Schamyl Bauman
- Written by: Schamyl Bauman; Arthur Spjuth; Sölve Cederstrand
- Starring: Sickan Carlsson; Karl-Arne Holmsten; Erik Berglund
- Cinematography: Sven Nykvist; Göran Strindberg
- Edited by: Schamyl Bauman; Arthur Spjuth
- Music by: Sune Waldimir
- Production company: Bauman-Produktion
- Distributed by: Sandrew-Baumanfilm
- Release date: 22 July 1955
- Running time: 110 minutes
- Country: Sweden
- Language: Swedish

Darling of Mine (Swedish: Älskling på vågen) is a 1955 Swedish comedy film directed by Schamyl Bauman and starring Sickan Carlsson, Karl-Arne Holmsten and Erik Berglund. It was shot at the Centrumateljéerna Studios in Stockholm. The film's sets were designed by the art director Arthur Spjuth.

== Synopsis ==
Swedish American Hollywood film star Jack Harris arrives in his Swedish homeland for the first time for a visit. Journalist Ingrid Billberg is determined to find out information from him.

== Cast ==
- Sickan Carlsson as Ingrid Billberg
- Karl-Arne Holmsten as Jack Harris
- Erik Berglund as Mr. Mayflower
- Barbro Hiort af Ornäs as Linda Loy
- Jan Molander as Fred Lindberg
- Gösta Cederlund as Newspaper Editor
- Sigge Fürst as Police Inspector Billberg
- Sten Mattsson as Knotan Lindberg
- John Botvid as Fisher Gustavsson
- Karl-Erik Forsgårdh as Roland
- Eric Gustafson as Police Inspector at Dalarö
- Alf Östlund as District Police Superintendent
- Barbro Flodquist as Journalist 'Bang'
- Helge Hagerman as Detective
- Axel Högel as Railway Worker
- Stig Johanson as Railway Worker
- Edvin Adolphson as The Author
- Sten Ardenstam as Journalist at the Garden Party
- Per-Axel Arosenius as Policeman at Dalarö
- Tor Bergner as Journalist at Expressen
- Curt Ericson as Journalist
- Albin Erlandzon as Fisherman
- Karl Erik Flens as Journalist
- Gösta Gustafson as Clerk at the Sea Rescue Office
- John Harryson as Policeman at Stockholm Central
- Gustaf Hiort af Ornäs as Journalist at Expressen
- Sven Holmberg as Journalist
- Lilavati Häger as Indian Woman
- Amy Jelf as Young Woman
- Ingrid Jellart as The Detective's Little Daughter
- Gösta Krantz as Ingrid's Photographer
- Torsten Lilliecrona as Man at Skansen Reading a Newspaper
- Arne Lindblad as Waiter
- Sten Lonnert as Journalist
- Gabriel Rosén as Policeman at Stockholm Central
- Birger Sahlberg as Man in Rescue Boat
- Georg Skarstedt as Man in Rescue Boat
- Rune Stylander as Journalist at Expressen

== Bibliography ==
- Per Olov Qvist & Peter von Bagh. Guide to the Cinema of Sweden and Finland. Greenwood Publishing Group, 2000.
