= Dance on Roses =

1954 film

- Directed by: Schamyl Bauman
- Written by: Sölve Cederstrand; Schamyl Bauman
- Produced by: Arthur Spjuth
- Starring: Sickan Carlsson; Karl-Arne Holmsten; Olof Winnerstrand
- Cinematography: Göran Strindberg
- Edited by: Schamyl Bauman; Arthur Spjuth
- Music by: Jules Sylvain
- Production company: Bauman-Produktion
- Distributed by: Sandrew-Baumanfilm
- Release date: 9 August 1954
- Running time: 119 minutes
- Country: Sweden
- Language: Swedish

Dance on Roses (Swedish: Dans på rosor) is a 1954 Swedish comedy drama film directed by Schamyl Bauman and starring Sickan Carlsson, Karl-Arne Holmsten and Olof Winnerstrand. It was shot at the Centrumateljéerna Studios in Stockholm. The film's sets were designed by the art director Arthur Spjuth.

== Plot ==
Marianne is a dancer at a theater that is threatened with closure due to financial trouble. Marianne is in love with the theater's owner. The actors go through much trouble to put on a new show, with Marianne as the leading lady. The show's fate will decide the fate of the theater.

== Main cast ==
- Sickan Carlsson as Marianne Molin
- Karl-Arne Holmsten as Stig Broman, engineer
- Olof Winnerstrand as Anders Olander
- Dagmar Ebbesen as Johanna
- John Botvid as Gustafsson
- Egon Larsson as Kurre Jansson
- Elisaveta as Clairy
- Hjördis Petterson as Olga Eckers
- Inger Juel as Maggie Broman
- Sten Gester as Sten Berger
- Axel Högel as Plinten Johansson
- Sten Mattsson as Varubud

== Bibliography ==
- Per Olov Qvist & Peter von Bagh. Guide to the Cinema of Sweden and Finland. Greenwood Publishing Group, 2000.
