= Viveca Serlachius =

Swedish actress

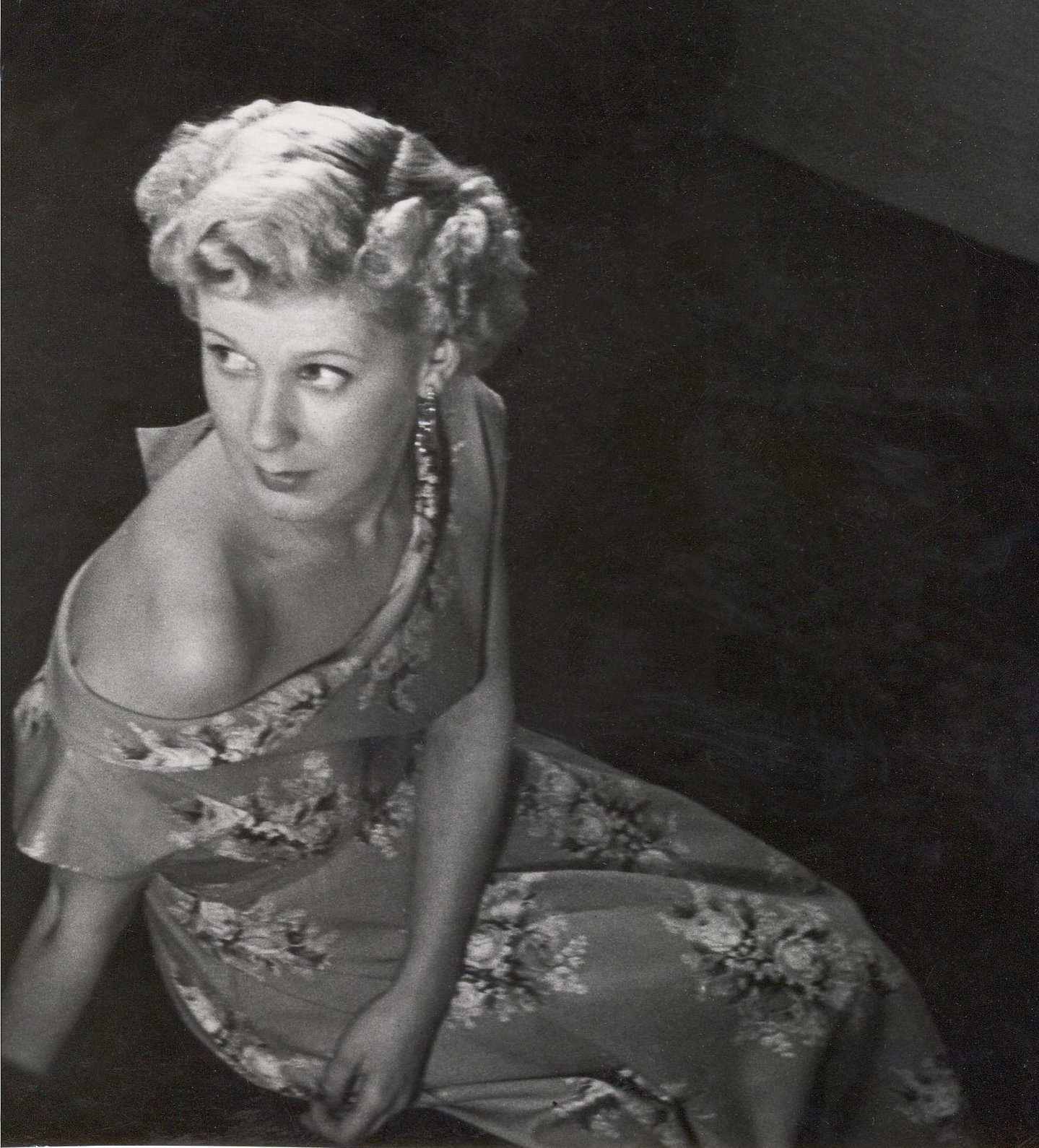
Viveca Serlachius

Viveca Elisabeth Marianne Serlachius Olsson (2 March 1923 – 9 January 1993) was a Finnish-born Swedish actress, best known as the first actress to play Pippi Longstocking on film, Pippi Longstocking in 1949, when she was aged 26 portraying a 9-year-old girl.

She was married to Torbjörn Olsson from 1954 until her death in 1993.

== Selected filmography ==
- The Journey Away (1945)
- The Night Watchman's Wife (1947)
- I Love You Karlsson (1947)
- Pippi Longstocking (1949)
- Playing Truant (1949)
- Fiancée for Hire (1950)
- The Motor Cavaliers (1950)
- Teacher's First Born (1950)
- Defiance (1952)
