= Life and Death (1943 film) =

1943 film

- Directed by: Rolf Husberg
- Written by: Hasse Ekman
- Starring: Nils Kihlberg; Birgit Tengroth; Hasse Ekman; Karl-Arne Holmsten; Lillebil Kjellén; Olof Widgren
- Cinematography: Ewert Löfstedt
- Edited by: Rolf Husberg
- Music by: Jules Sylvain
- Production company: Sandrews
- Distributed by: Sandrew-Baumanfilm
- Release date: 16 July 1943
- Running time: 94 minutes
- Country: Sweden
- Language: Swedish

Life and Death (Swedish: På liv och död) is a 1943 Swedish drama film directed by Rolf Husberg and starring Nils Kihlberg, Birgit Tengroth and Hasse Ekman. The film's sets were designed by the art director Bibi Lindström.

== Plot summary ==
During World War II, a train accident in northern Sweden is suspected to be a sabotage. Some soldiers and guests at a ski resort try to investigate what happened and determine who is responsible.

== Cast ==
- Birgit Tengroth as Karin Sjövall
- Nils Kihlberg as Fänrik Sture Holm
- Hasse Ekman as Kirre Granlund
- Lillebil Kjellén as Gittan
- Gull Natorp as Mrs. Lewen
- Björn Berglund as Petter Pettersson, soldier
- Fritiof Billquist as Jöns Jönsson
- Gunnar Sjöberg as Sergeant Lundblad
- Rune Halvarsson as Berra Sandström, soldier
- Karl-Arne Holmsten as Lieutenant Lönnbäck
- Olof Widgren as Captain C. Åström
- Anna-Stina Wåglund as Mrs. Jönsson
- Kotti Chave as Lasse Persson, ski instructor
- Birger Malmsten as Telephone Operator
- Mimi Nelson as Dancing Woman

== Bibliography ==
- Gustafsson, Fredrik. The Man from the Third Row: Hasse Ekman, Swedish Cinema and the Long Shadow of Ingmar Bergman. Berghahn Books, 2016.
