= Tonight or Never (1941 film) =

- Directed by: Gustaf Molander
- Written by: Paul Baudisch; Börje Larsson; Gustaf Molander; Nils Perne; Adolf Schütz; Åke Söderblom
- Starring: Åke Soderblom; Thor Modéen; Sickan Carlsson
- Cinematography: Åke Dahlqvist
- Edited by: Edvin Hammarberg
- Music by: Gunnar Johansson
- Production company: Svensk Filmindustri
- Release date: 4 June 1941
- Running time: 85 minutes
- Country: Sweden
- Language: Swedish

Tonight or Never (Swedish: I natt - eller aldrig) is a 1941 Swedish comedy film directed by Gustaf Molander and starring Åke Söderblom, Thor Modéen and Sickan Carlsson. Molander was also one of half a dozen script writers for the film, including Söderblom.

The film's art direction was by Arne Åkermark.

== Main cast ==
- Åke Söderblom as Erik Andersson
- Thor Modéen as John Sjölin
- Sickan Carlsson as Margit Holm
- Barbro Kollberg as Eva Hedman
- Håkan Westergren as Bertil Hallgren
- Tollie Zellman as Rigolescu
- Erik 'Bullen' Berglund as Ekberg
- Eric Abrahamsson as Hotel Concierge
- Hugo Björne as Col. Werner
- Erik A. Petschler as Berglind
- Margit Andelius as Miss Viola Berg
- Eivor Engelbrektsson as Miss Lisa

== See also ==
- Only One Night (1939 film)

== Bibliography ==
- Larsson, Mariah & Marklund, Anders. Swedish Film: An Introduction and Reader. Nordic Academic Press, 2010.
