= Schamyl Bauman =

Swedish film director (1893–1966)

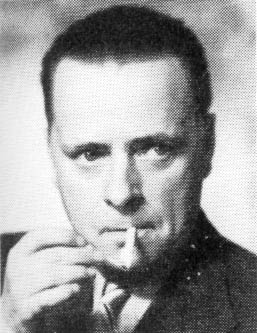
- Schamyl Bauman
- Born: Magnus Schmayl Bauman; 4 December 1893; Vimmerby, Småland, Sweden
- Died: 28 February 1966 (aged 72); Sweden
- Occupation: Film director

Magnus Schamyl Bauman (4 December 1893 – 28 February 1966) was a Swedish film director (in 1931–57).

Born in Vimmerby, Småland. First studied law and modern languages at Uppsala University. In 1917 he began to work with translating text lines for international silent films (to Swedish), which he did successful throughout the 1920s. In this way he watched many different films by some of the best silent film directors in the world which started an interest in filmmaking and in the arts of film. In 1929-30 he started the film company Europafilm with Gustaf Scheutz where he made some of his early films as a director. He later started a company with the influential film personality and business man Anders Sandrew in 1939, AB Sandrew-Bauman Film, where he made his most successful films, among others his popular "Sickan Carlsson-films", where his most popular and critically praised film was the 1949 comedy Skolka skolan (Playing Truant) with Carlsson in the lead.

As a filmmaker he came to specialize in the comedy genre and made some of the best classic Swedish film comedies of those days.

== Selected filmography ==
=== Director ===
- Kärlek och landstorm (1931)
- Saturday Nights (1933)
- Secret Svensson (1933)
- The Women Around Larsson (1934)
- Raggen (1936)
- Witches' Night (1937)
- Career (1938)
- Comrades in Uniform (1938)
- The Two of Us (1939)
- Wanted (1939)
- Life Begins Today (1939)
- Her Little Majesty (1939)
- Swing it magistern (1940)
- Heroes in Yellow and Blue (1940)
- A Real Man (1940)
- The Three of Us (1940)
- Fröken Kyrkråtta (1941)
- The Ghost Reporter (1941)
- Magistrarna på sommarlov (1941)
- We House Slaves (1942)
- In Darkest Smaland (1943)
- Prince Gustaf (1944)
- The Girls in Smaland (1945)
- Hotell Kåkbrinken (1946)
- Maj på Malö (1947)
- Robinson in Roslagen (1948)
- Playing Truant (1949)
- Teacher's First Born (1950)
- My Sister and I (1950)
- My Name Is Puck (1951)
- Classmates (1952)
- One Fiancée at a Time (1952)
- Dance on Roses (1954)
- Darling of Mine (1955)
- Mother Takes a Vacation (1957)

=== Screenwriter ===
- The Southsiders (1932)
- Fridolf in the Lion's Den (1933)
