= Gösta Krantz =

Swedish actor

- Born: Gösta Clarence Isidor Krantz; 14 June 1925; Stockholm, Sweden
- Died: 26 December 2008 (aged 83); Stockholm, Sweden
- Occupation: Actor
- Years active: 1945–2001
- Spouses: Gun (divorced) Birgit (m. 1982)
- Children: 2 (with Gun)

Gösta Clarence Isidor Krantz (14 June 1925 – 26 December 2008) was a Swedish actor and revue artist.

Gösta Krantz was born in Ektorp in Nacka south-east of Stockholm. He started off as a confectioner, but in 1945 turned into acting after having participated in a popular revue named Vi som vill opp. He later became a permanent stage member of the well-known revue group Casino-gänget.

In 1951, Krantz made his film acting debut in 91:an Karlssons bravader, and later performed in popular comedies such as Åsa-Nisse, and various television dramas such as Rederiet. In 2005, Krantz published his biography called Krantz från glädjevården.

Krantz died in 2008 in Stockholm of heart failure due to an infection.

== Selected filmography ==
- 1951 91 Karlssons bravader
- 1952 Kalle Karlsson of Jularbo
- 1952 U-Boat 39
- 1952 The Green Lift
- 1953 Alla tiders 91 Karlsson
- 1953 Kungen av Dalarna
- 1953 Vi tre debutera
- 1954 Aldrig med min kofot eller Drömtjuven
- 1955 91 Karlsson rycker in
- 1955 Bröderna Östermans bravader
- 1955 The Dance Hall
- 1955 Het är min längtan
- 1955 Janne Vängman och den stora kometen
- 1955 Så tuktas kärleken
- 1955 Åsa-Nisse ordnar allt
- 1955 Darling of Mine
- 1956 Flamman
- 1956 Pettersson i Annorlunda
- 1956 Syndare i filmparadiset
- 1956 Den tappre soldaten Jönsson
- 1957 91:an Karlsson slår knock out
- 1957 Enslingen Johannes
- 1957 Mother Takes a Vacation
- 1959 91:an Karlsson muckar (tror han)
- 1959 Enslingen i blåsväder
- 1959 Sängkammartjuven
- On a Bench in a Park (1960)
- Andersson's Kalle (1972)
