= Nils Kihlberg =

Swedish actor (1915–1965)

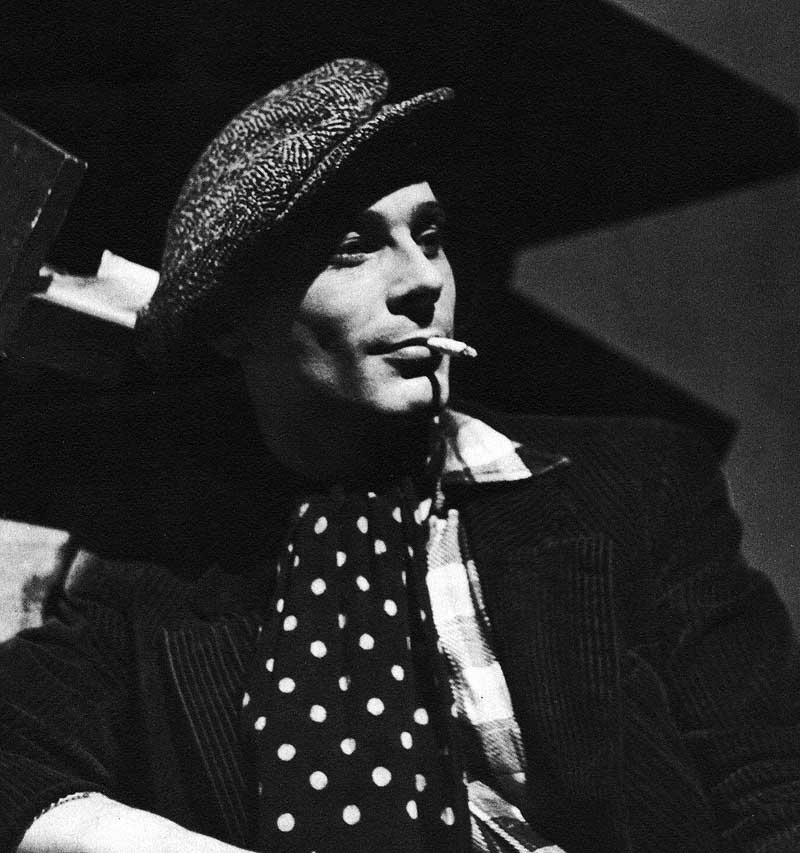
- Nils Kihlberg in 1950
- Born: 4 June 1915; Stockholm, Sweden
- Died: 2 April 1965 (aged 49); Stockholm, Sweden
- Occupations: Actor, singer
- Years active: 1938–1964

Nils Kihlberg (4 June 1915 – 2 April 1965) was a Swedish actor, singer and director known for En trallande jänta (1942), Bröderna Östermans huskors (1945) and Det är min musik (1942). He died on 2 April 1965 in Stockholm. Nils appeared in approximately 40 films and He was married to actress Mimi Nelson.

== Selected filmography ==
- Circus (1939)
- Beredskapspojkar (1940)
- It Is My Music (1942)
- Snapphanar (1941)
- En trallande jänta (1942)
- Det är min musik (1942)
- Life and Death (1943)
- Men of the Navy (1943)
- Motherhood (1945)
- The Österman Brothers' Virago (1945)
- While the Door Was Locked (1946)
- Teacher's First Born (1950)
- Mord, lilla vän (1955)
- When the Mills are Running (1956)
- Laughing in the Sunshine (1956)
- Änglar, finns dom? (1961)
