= Olof Bergström =

Swedish actor (1919–1984)

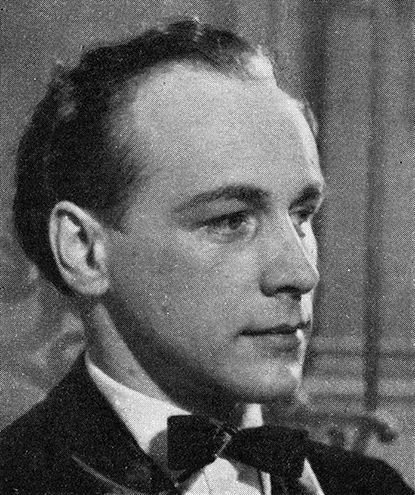
- Born: 21 November 1919; Karlskrona, Sweden
- Died: 22 November 1984 (aged 65)
- Occupation: Actor
- Years active: 1943-1984

Olof Bergström (21 November 1919 – 22 November 1984) was a Swedish actor. He appeared in 50 films and television shows between 1943 and 1984.

== Selected filmography ==
- 1945: Oss tjuvar emellan eller En burk ananas as Gustav, Olle's friend
- 1969: Ådalen 31 as Olof Björklund
- 1969: Made in Sweden as Grönroos
- 1975: Maria as the probation officer
- 1980: To Be a Millionaire as Bengt Sundelin
- 1981: Rasmus på luffen as the sheriff
