= Sickan Carlsson =

Swedish actress and singer

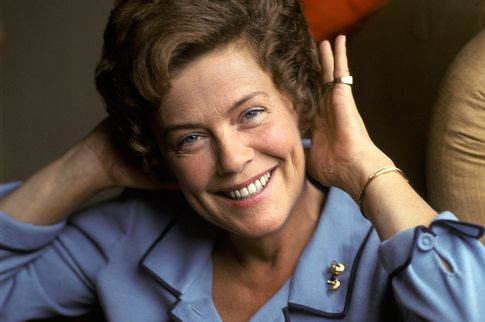
- Carlsson in 1965.
- Born: Sickan Anna-Greta Carlsson; 12 August 1915; Stockholm, Sweden
- Died: 2 November 2011 (aged 96); Stockholm, Sweden
- Occupations: Actress, singer
- Years active: 1932–1992
- Spouses: Gösta Reuter (m. 1939; div. 1945) Åke Rapp (m. 1945; div. 1955) Sölve Adamsson (m. 1958; died 1987)
- Children: 1

Sickan Anna-Greta Carlsson (12 August 1915 – 2 November 2011) was a Swedish film and theatre actress and singer.

== Biography ==
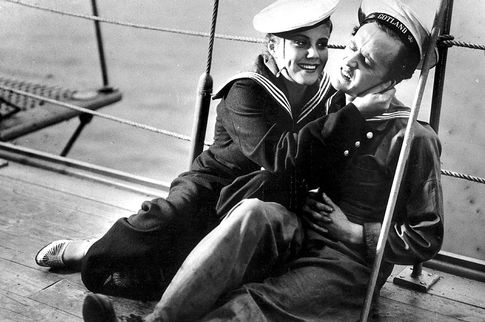
Scene from the movie Klart till drabbning (1937). Sickan Carlsson and Åke Söderblom in sailor suits.

From the 1930s to 1950s, Carlsson was Sweden's most popular film actress and its highest paid, topping the salary of even the most popular male performer. She was also an accomplished singer and recording artist and performed on stage and in musical revues. She was noted for her comedic films, which peaked during World War II. Several of her films from this period include upbeat musical numbers intended to raise the morale of her war-weary audiences. The characters she portrayed in the post-war years were often more complex than those she had played previously and featured less of her singing talents. Her screen persona was that of a carefree, energetic young woman who faced everyday problems with optimism. Her films were immensely popular and often had long runs in theaters.

Carlsson is most closely associated with two directors: Schamyl Bauman (in films from 1945 to 1955) and Hasse Ekman (1956–65). Although remembered mostly for her light-hearted roles, she was also able to portray darker characters when called upon. One of her best known dramatic outings was in 1961's Lustgården (aka The Pleasure Garden), with a script written specifically for her by Ingmar Bergman.

Carlsson stated publicly that she did not mind being typecast in comedic roles, however, and is proud to have been given parts which allowed her the opportunity to make her audiences laugh. Some of her best films are Det glada kalaset (1946), Skolka skolan (1948), Klasskamrater (1952), Sjunde himlen (1956) and Lustgården (1961).

== Marriages ==
Born into a working-class family, she fought to be accepted in an upper-class environment and endured two broken marriages before wedding businessman Sölve Adamsson which ended with his death in 1987. Her first marriage, to Gösta Reuter, produced a daughter, Ingegerd.

== Later years ==
In 2005 she was awarded an Honorary Guldbagge Award at the Guldbagge Awards in Sweden.

== Selected filmography ==
Sickan Carlsson at Södra Teatern 1934

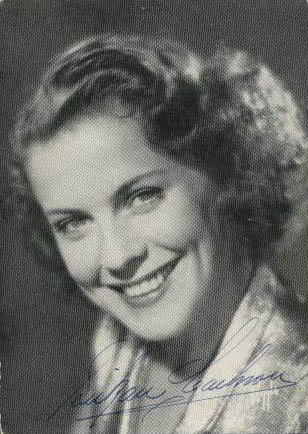
An autographed photo, mid-1940s

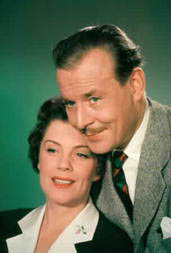
With actor and director Hasse Ekman, publicity shot from late 1950s

- A Stolen Waltz (1932) - Aina
- Jag gifta mig - aldrig (1932) - Maid (uncredited)
- Dear Relatives (1933) - Marianne Friis
- The Song to Her (1934) - Märta Holm
- Simon of Backabo (1934) - Greta
- Kärlek efter noter (1935) - Ingrid Blomkvist
- The People of Småland (1935) - Inga Blomgren
- Russian Flu (1937) - Bojan
- Klart till drabbning (1937) - Britta Birke
- Oh, Such a Night! (1937) - Irma Berggren
- Thunder and Lightning (1938) - Pyret Hanson, balettflicka
- Just a Bugler (1938) - Gertrud Brinkman
- Nothing But the Truth (1939) - Märta Lund
- Landstormens lilla Lotta (1939) - Elsa Strid
- Oh, What a Boy! (1939) - Eva Blomberg
- Gentleman att hyra (1940) - Claire Wanner
- Landstormens lilla argbigga (1941) - Marianne Norrenius
- Tonight or Never (1941) - Margit Holm
- Flickan i fönstret mitt emot (1942) - Ingrid Linder
- Löjtnantshjärtan (1942) - Louise Pålsson
- A Girl for Me (1943) - Vera Lanner
- Hans officiella fästmö (1944) - Monica Brandt
- The Green Lift (1944) - Lillan
- The Girls in Smaland (1945) - Christina Larsson
- Det glada kalaset (1946) - Britt Granvik
- Wedding Night (1947) - Yvonne
- Pappa sökes (1947) - Mary Broberg
- Life at Forsbyholm Manor 1948) - Britt Lange
- Playing Truant (1949) - Margareta Carlson-Kronberg
- Jungfrun på Jungfrusund (1949) - Ingrid, maid
- My Sister and I (1950) - Katarina Hassel / Birgitta Hassel
- Teacher's First Born (1950) - Sonja Broberg, journalist
- My Name Is Puck (1951) - Puck Andersson
- One Fiancée at a Time (1952) - Lillian 'Lillan' Carlberg
- Classmates (1952) - Anna-Greta Wallin
- Dance on Roses (1954) - Marianne Molin
- Darling of Mine (1955) - Ingrid Billberg
- Seventh Heaven (1956) - Lovisa Sundelius, underläkare
- The Halo Is Slipping (1957) - Birgitta Lövgren
- You Are My Adventure (1958) - Lena Bergström
- Fröken Chic (1959) - Isabella Linder
- Heaven and Pancake (1959) - Lovisa Sundelius
- The Pleasure Garden (1961) - Fanny, Waitress
- Niklasons (1965, TV Series) - Elisabeth Niklason
- Andersson's Kalle (1972) - Anderssonskan
- Bröllopet (1973) - Birgit Strid
- Andersson's Kalle on Top Form (1973) - Anderssonskan
- Charlotte Löwensköld (1979) - Regina Forsius, Rural Dean's Wife
- Öbergs på Lillöga (1983, TV Series) - Britta
- Kusiner i kubik (1992, TV Series) - Margot, Bengt's mother

== Source and references ==
- Carlsson, Sickan; Sickan (autobiography), Bonniers, Stockholm, Sweden, 1977.
- Holm, Crick; På tu man hand med filmidoler (chapter Sickan Carlsson), Medéns, Stockholm, Sweden, 1947.
