= Aurore Palmgren =

Swedish actress (1880–1961)

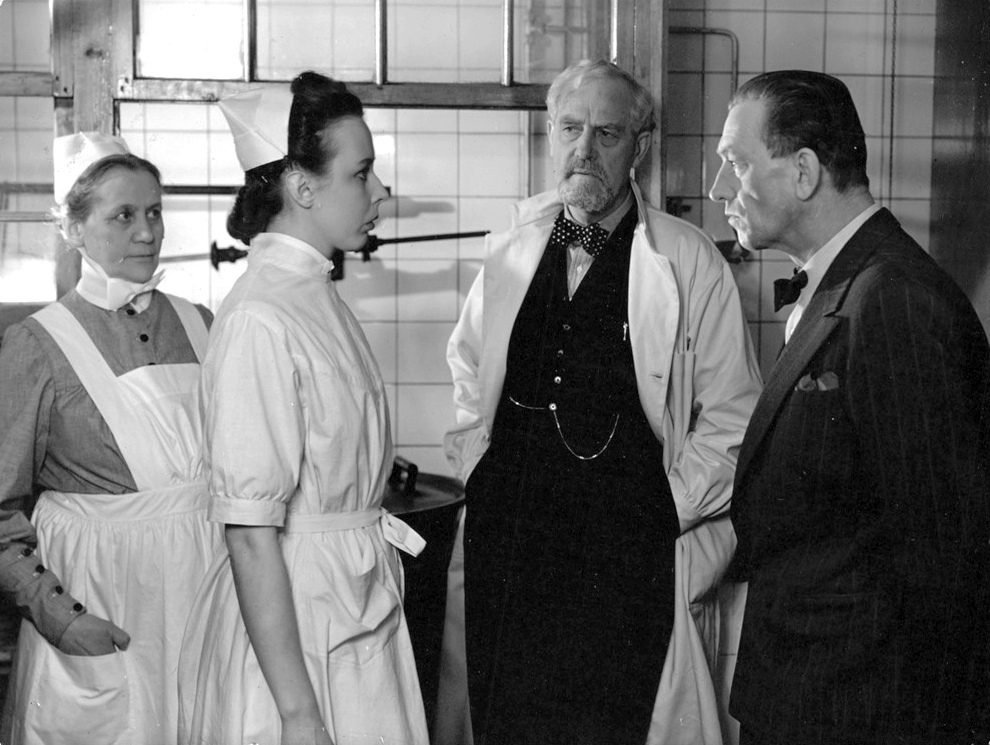
- Still from The Fight Continues (1941) with Aurore Palmgren, Victor Sjöström, and Carl Ström
- Born: Selma Charlotta Aurora Palmgren; 28 March 1880; Stockholm, Sweden
- Died: 28 June 1961 (aged 81); Stockholm, Sweden
- Occupation: Actress
- Years active: 1902-1957

Aurore Palmgren (28 March 1880 – 28 June 1961) was a Swedish stage and film actress.

== Selected filmography ==
Year	Title	Role	Notes
1936	The Lady Becomes a Maid	Party Guest	
1937	Witches' Night	Sidonia	
1938	Career	Prompter	
1938	Storm Over the Skerries	Gossip	
1939	Her Little Majesty	Maria	
1940	Bashful Anton	Beata	
1941	The Fight Continues	Nurse	
1941	Goransson's Boy	Quarrelling Woman	
1943	I Killed	Head Nurse	
1943	In Darkest Smaland	Old woman	
1944	I Am Fire and Air	Nurse	
1944	My People Are Not Yours	Maria	
1945	The Österman Brothers' Virago	Stinna Olsson	
1945	Man's Woman	Karna	
1946	Brita in the Merchant's House	Arvid's Mother	
1947	No Way Back	Mrs. Jörgensen	
1948	Sin	Hilda	
1948	Lars Hård	Old Woman on the Road	
1949	Bohus Battalion	Alma	
1949	Woman in White	Miss Andersson	
1950	The Quartet That Split Up	Alida	
1950	Pimpernel Svensson	Willy's Mother	
1951	My Name Is Puck	Lotten the Maid	
1953	The Girl from Backafall	Botilla	
1953	Unmarried Mothers	Stepmother	
1953	No Man's Woman	Arne's Mother	
1954	Karin Månsdotter	Göran Persson's mother	as Aurora Palmgren
1955	Wild Birds	Mrs. Larsson	
1957	The Minister of Uddarbo	Vicar's wife	

== Bibliography ==
- Rasmussen, Bjørn. Filmens hvem-vad-hvor: Udenlanske film 1950-1967. Politiken, 1968.
