= Per Olov Qvist =

Swedish writer

- Born: November 22, 1948 (age 77); Borlänge, Sweden
- Education: Stockholm University
- Occupations: Film scholar, critic, author
- Writing career
- Language: Swedish
- Genre: Film studies

Per Olov Qvist, also Per Olof Qvist (born November 22, 1948) is a Swedish film scholar, critic and author.

Per Olov Qvist was born in Borlänge and grew up in Hagalund. From 1974 to 1989 he worked with the magazine Filmhäftet. In 1986 he received his Ph.D. in film from the Stockholm University with a thesis on Swedish rural film genre (published as his 1986 book).

== Books ==
- 1974: Amerikansk gangsterfilm under 1930-talet: försök till en historisk översikt
- 1986: Jorden är vår arvedel: landsbygden i svensk spelfilm 1940-1959
- 1995: Folkhemmets bilder: modernisering, motstånd och mentalitet i den svenska 30-talsfilmen
- 2000: Per Olov Qvist; Peter von Bagh. Guide to the cinema of Sweden and Finland. p. 275.
