= List of Swedish films of the 1940s =

This is a list of films produced in Sweden and in the Swedish language in the 1940s.

== 1940 ==
English Title	Swedish Title	Director	Cast	Genre	Notes
1940
Bashful Anton	Blyge Anton	Emil A. Lingheim	Edvard Persson, Ingrid Luterkort, Britta Brunius	Comedy	
The Bjorck Family	Familjen Björck	Anders Henrikson	Olof Winnerstrand, Frida Winnerstrand, Birgitta Arman	Comedy	
Blossom Time	Den blomstertid	Alf Sjöberg	Sture Lagerwall, Gerd Hagman, Arnold Sjöstrand	Drama	
The Crazy Family	Snurriga familjen	Ivar Johansson	Thor Modéen, Elsa Carlsson, Åke Söderblom	Comedy	
A Crime	Ett brott	Anders Henrikson	Edvin Adolphson, Karin Ekelund, Carl Barcklind	Crime	
Hanna in Society	Hanna i societén	Gunnar Olsson	Rut Holm, Carl Barcklind, Elsa Carlsson	Comedy	
Her Melody	Hennes melodi	Thor L. Brooks	Sonja Wigert, Sture Lagerwall, Margit Manstad	Comedy	
Heroes in Yellow and Blue	Hjältar i gult och blått	Schamyl Bauman	Thor Modéen, Elof Ahrle, Tollie Zellman	Comedy	
June Nights	Juninatten	Per Lindberg	Ingrid Bergman, Marianne Löfgren, Marianne Aminoff	Drama	
Kiss Her!	Kyss henne!	Weyler Hildebrand	Annalisa Ericson, Thor Modéen	Comedy	
One, But a Lion!	En, men ett lejon!	Gustaf Molander	Håkan Westergren, Annalisa Ericson, Marianne Aminoff	Comedy	
A Real Man	Karl för sin hatt	Schamyl Bauman	Adolf Jahr, Birgit Tengroth, Sigurd Wallén	Comedy	
A Sailor on Horseback	En sjöman till häst	Emil A. Lingheim	Edvard Persson, Karl-Arne Holmsten, Ivar Kåge	Comedy	
The Song of the Wilderness	Vildmarkens sång	Gösta Stevens	Georg Løkkeberg, Signe Hasso, Alfred Maurstad	Drama	Co-production with Norway
They Staked Their Lives	Med livet som insats	Alf Sjöberg	Aino Taube, Anders Henrikson	Drama	
The Three of Us	Vi tre	Schamyl Bauman	Sture Lagerwall, Signe Hasso, Stig Järrel	Drama	
With Open Arms	Stora famnen	Gustaf Edgren	Sigurd Wallén, Signe Hasso, Olof Molander	Comedy	

== 1941 ==
English Title	Swedish Title	Director	Cast	Genre	Notes
1941
Bright Prospects	Den ljusnande framtid	Gustaf Molander	Signe Hasso, Ernst Eklund, Erik 'Bullen' Berglund	Drama	
Dunungen	Dunungen	Weyler Hildebrand	Karin Nordgren, Adolf Jahr, Hilda Borgström	Drama	
The Fight Continues	Striden går vidare	Gustaf Molander	Victor Sjöström, Renée Björling, Alf Kjellin	Drama	
Fransson the Terrible	Fransson den förskräcklige	Gösta Cederlund	Elof Ahrle, Carl-Gunnar Wingård, Inga-Bodil Vetterlund	Comedy	
The Ghost Reporter	Spokreportern	Schamyl Bauman	Åke Söderblom, Thor Modéen, Annalisa Ericson	Comedy	
Home from Babylon	Hem från Babylon	Alf Sjöberg	Gerd Hagman, Arnold Sjöstrand, Georg Rydeberg	Drama	
How to Tame a Real Man	Så tuktas en äkta man	Ragnar Arvedson	Birgit Tengroth, Håkan Westergren, Thor Modéen	Comedy	
If I Could Marry the Minister	Tänk, om jag gifter mig med prästen	Ivar Johansson	Viveca Lindfors, Georg Rydeberg, Arnold Sjöstrand	Drama	
In Paradise	I paradis...	Per Lindberg	Viveca Lindfors, Georg Rydeberg, Birgitta Valberg	Comedy	
Lasse-Maja	Lasse-Maja	Gunnar Olsson	Sture Lagerwall, Liane Linden, Emil Fjellström	Historical	
Life Goes On	Livet går vidare	Anders Henrikson	Edvin Adolphson, Aino Taube, Sigurd Wallén	Drama	
Lucky Young Lady	Ung dam med tur	Ragnar Arvedson	Sonja Wigert, Karl-Arne Holmsten, Dagmar Ebbesen	Comedy	
Only a Woman	Bara en kvinna	Anders Henrikson	Karin Ekelund, Arnold Sjöstrand, Karin Kavli	Comedy	
Goransson's Boy	Göranssons pojke	Weyler Hildebrand	Adolf Jahr, Dagmar Ebbesen, Emil Fjellström	Drama	
Poor Ferdinand	Stackars Ferdinand	Nils Jerring	Thor Modéen, Åke Söderblom, Tollie Zellman	Comedy	
The Poor Millionaire	En fattig miljonär	Sigurd Wallén	Stig Järrel, Dagmar Ebbesen, Marianne Aminoff	Comedy	
Scanian Guerilla	Snapphanar	Åke Ohberg	Edvard Persson, Tekla Sjöblom, George Fant	Historical	
Sunny Sunberg	Soliga Solberg	Emil A. Lingheim	Edvard Persson, Märta Arbin, Tord Bernheim	Comedy	
The Talk of the Town	Det sags pa stan	Per Lindberg	Olof Sandborg, Carl Ström, Marianne Löfgren	Drama	
The Teachers on Summer Vacation	Magistrarna på sommarlov	Schamyl Bauman	Alice Babs, Karl-Arne Holmsten, Carl Hagman	Comedy	
Tonight or Never	I natt - eller aldrig	Gustaf Molander	Åke Söderblom, Thor Modéen, Sickan Carlsson	Comedy	
The Train Leaves at Nine	Tåget går klockan 9	Ivar Johansson	Thor Modéen, Torsten Winge, Allan Bohlin	Comedy	
We're All Errand Boys	Springpojkar ä vi allihopa!	Ivar Johansson	Åke Söderblom, Rune Halvarsson, Gunnar Höglund	Comedy	
Woman on Board	En kvinna ombord	Gunnar Skoglund	Edvin Adolphson, Karin Ekelund, Hampe Faustman	War	

== 1942 ==
English Title	Swedish Title	Director	Cast	Genre	Notes
1942
Adventurer	En äventyrare	Gunnar Olsson	Sture Lagerwall, Ingrid Backlin, Margit Manstad	Historical	
The Case of Ingegerd Bremssen	Fallet Ingegerd Bremssen	Anders Henrikson	Sonja Wigert, Dagmar Ebbesen, Gösta Cederlund	Drama	
Dangerous Ways	Farliga vägar	Anders Henrikson	Karin Ekelund, Georg Rydeberg, Ernst Eklund	Drama	
Doctor Glas	Doktor Glas	Rune Carlsten	Georg Rydeberg, Irma Christenson, Hilda Borgström	Drama	
Flames in the Dark	Lågor i dunklet	Hasse Ekman	Edvin Adolphson, Inga Tidblad, Stig Järrel	Drama	
General von Döbeln	General von Döbeln	Olof Molander	Edvin Adolphson, Poul Reumert, Eva Henning	Historical	
The Heavenly Play	Himlaspelet	Alf Sjöberg	Rune Lindström, Eivor Landström, Anders Henrikson	Drama	
It Is My Music	Det ar min musik	Börje Larsson	Nils Kihlberg, Eva Henning, Sigurd Wallén	Comedy	
Nothing Is Forgotten	Man glömmer ingenting	Åke Ohberg	Edvin Adolphson, Gerd Hagman, Marianne Löfgren	Drama	
Ride Tonight!	Rid i natt	Gustaf Molander	Lars Hanson, Gerd Hagman, Eva Dahlbeck	Historical	
Sun Over Klara	Sol över Klara	Emil A. Lingheim	Edvard Persson, Barbro Flodquist, Stina Ståhle	Drama	
Take Care of Ulla	Ta hand om Ulla	Ivar Johansson	Marianne Aminoff, Bengt Logardt, Åke Grönberg	Drama	
Tomorrow's Melody	Morgondagens melodi	Ragnar Frisk	Viveca Lindfors, Nils Lundell, Björn Berglund	Drama	
We House Slaves	Vi hemslavinnor	Schamyl Bauman	Dagmar Ebbesen, John Botvid, Ernst Eklund	Comedy	
The Yellow Clinic	Gula kliniken	Ivar Johansson	Arnold Sjöstrand, Viveca Lindfors, Gudrun Brost	Drama	

== 1943 ==
English Title	Swedish Title	Director	Cast	Genre	Notes
1943
The Brothers' Woman	Brödernas kvinna	Gösta Cederlund	Viveca Lindfors, Arnold Sjöstrand, Gunnar Sjöberg	Drama	
Captured by a Voice	Fångad av en röst	Ivar Johansson	Rut Holm, Åke Grönberg, Bengt Logardt	Comedy	
Elvira Madigan	Elvira Madigan	Åke Ohberg	Eva Henning, Åke Ohberg, Irma Christenson	Drama	
Gentleman with a Briefcase	Herre med portfölj	Ragnar Arvedson	Georg Rydeberg, Irma Christenson, Anne-Margrethe Björlin	Drama	
A Girl for Me	En flicka för mej	Börje Larsson	Sickan Carlsson, Karl-Arne Holmsten, Max Hansen	Comedy	
I Killed	Jag dräpte	Olof Molander	Anders Henrikson, Arnold Sjöstrand, Irma Christenson	Drama	
Imprisoned Women	Kvinnor i fångenskap	Olof Molander	Gunnar Sjöberg, Elsie Albiin, Gunn Wållgren	Drama	
In Darkest Smaland	I mörkaste Småland	Schamyl Bauman	Sigurd Wallén, Emil Fjellström, Gull Natorp	Comedy	
Katrina	Katrina	Gustaf Edgren	Märta Ekström, Frank Sundström, Hampe Faustman	Drama	
Life and Death	På liv och död	Rolf Husberg	Nils Kihlberg, Birgit Tengroth, Hasse Ekman	Drama	
Life in the Country	Livet på landet	Bror Bügler	Edvard Persson, George Fant, Birgitta Valberg	Comedy	
Little Napoleon	Lille Napoleon	Gustaf Edgren	Åke Söderblom, Annalisa Ericson, Marianne Löfgren	Comedy	
Men of the Navy	Örlogsmän	Börje Larsson	Nils Kihlberg, Karl-Arne Holmsten, Anne-Margrethe Björlin	Drama	
Mister Collins' Adventure	Herr Collins äventyr	Anders Henrikson	Anders Henrikson, Birgit Sergelius, Thor Modéen	Comedy	
Night in Port	Natt i hamn	Hampe Faustman	Sigurd Wallén, Birgit Tengroth, Alf Kjellin	Drama	
She Thought It Was Him	Hon trodde det var han	Per-Axel Branner	Edvin Adolphson, Anne-Margrethe Björlin, Naemi Briese	Comedy	
The Sin of Anna Lans	Anna Lans	Rune Carlsten	Viveca Lindfors, Arnold Sjöstrand, Gudrun Brost	Drama	
The Sixth Shot	Sjätte skottet	Hasse Ekman	Edvin Adolphson, Karin Ekelund, Gunn Wållgren	Drama	
Sonja	Sonja	Hampe Faustman	Birgit Tengroth, Åke Grönberg, Sture Lagerwall	Drama	
There's a Fire Burning	Det brinner en eld	Gustaf Molander	Inga Tidblad, Lars Hanson, Victor Sjöström	Drama	
The Word	Ordet	Gustaf Molander	Victor Sjöström, Holger Löwenadler, Rune Lindström	Drama	
Young Blood	Ungt blod	Ivar Johansson	Agneta Lagerfeldt, Toivo Pawlo, Olof Widgren	Drama	

== 1944 ==
English Title	Swedish Title	Director	Cast	Genre	Notes
1944
Appassionata	Appassionata	Olof Molander	Georg Rydeberg, Viveca Lindfors, Alf Kjellin	Drama	
Blizzard	Snöstormen	Åke Ohberg	Karin Ekelund, Gunnar Olsson, Liane Linden	Drama	
Count Only the Happy Moments	Räkna de lyckliga stunderna blott	Rune Carlsten	Sonja Wigert, Arnold Sjöstrand, Olof Widgren	Comedy	
Dolly Takes a Chance	Dolly tar chansen	Gustaf Edgren	Marguerite Viby, Karl-Arne Holmsten	Comedy	
Eaglets	Örnungar	Ivar Johansson	Alice Babs, Lasse Dahlquist, Sten Lindgren	Drama	
The Emperor of Portugallia	Kejsarn av Portugallien	Gustaf Molander	Victor Sjöström, Gunn Wållgren, Karl-Arne Holmsten	Drana	
The Forest Is Our Heritage	Skogen är vår arvedel	Ivar Johansson	Erik 'Bullen' Berglund, Birgit Tengroth, Sven Magnusson	Drama	
The Girl and the Devil	Flickan och djävulen	Hampe Faustman	Kolbjörn Knudsen, Gunn Wållgren, Stig Järrel	Mystery	
The Green Lift	Gröna hissen	Börje Larsson	Max Hansen, Sickan Carlsson, Gaby Stenberg	Comedy	
Guttersnipes	Rännstensungar	Ragnar Frisk	Adolf Jahr, Britta Brunius, Harry Persson	Drama	
His Excellency	Excellensen	Hasse Ekman	Lars Hanson, Gunnar Sjöberg, Elsie Albiin	Drama	
I Am Fire and Air	Jag är eld och luft	Anders Henrikson	Viveca Lindfors, Stig Järrel, Olof Widgren	Drama	
The Invisible Wall	Den osynliga muren	Gustaf Molander	Inga Tidblad, Irma Christenson, Karl-Arne Holmsten	Drama	
Live Dangerously	Lev farligt	Lauritz Falk	Lauritz Falk, Irma Christenson, Elof Ahrle	Drama	
My People Are Not Yours	Mitt folk är icke ditt	Weyler Hildebrand	Sonja Wigert, Gunnar Björnstrand, Hampe Faustman	Drama	
The Old Clock at Ronneberga	Klockan på Rönneberga	Gunnar Skoglund	Lauritz Falk, Vibeke Falk, Hilda Borgström	Drama	
The People of Hemsö	Hemsöborna	Sigurd Wallén	Adolf Jahr, Dagmar Ebbesen, Emil Fjellström	Drama	
Prince Gustaf	Prins Gustaf	Schamyl Bauman	Alf Kjellin, Mai Zetterling, Lennart Bernadotte	Historical	
Skipper Jansson	Skeppar Jansson	Sigurd Wallén	Sigurd Wallén, Douglas Håge, Artur Rolén	Comedy	
Torment	Hets	Alf Sjöberg	Alf Kjellin, Mai Zetterling, Stig Järrel	Drama	Won Palme d'Or ("Golden Palm") at the Cannes Film Festival, 1946 (shared)
Turn of the Century	När seklet var ungt	Gunnar Olsson	Edvard Persson, Stina Hedberg, Marianne Gyllenhammar	Drama	
We Need Each Other	Vi behöver varann	Hampe Faustman	Ludde Gentzel, Ingrid Borthen, Carl Ström	Drama	

== 1945 ==
English Title	Swedish Title	Director	Cast	Genre	Notes
1945
Black Roses	Svarta rosor	Rune Carlsten	Viveca Lindfors, Anders Ek, Ulf Palme	Drama	
Blood and Fire	Blod och eld	Anders Henrikson	Anders Henrikson, Sonja Wigert, George Fant	Drama	
Crime and Punishment	Brott och straff	Hampe Faustman	Gunn Wållgren, Sigurd Wallén, Elsie Albiin	Drama	
The Gallows Man	Galgmannen	Gustaf Molander	Edvin Adolphson, Wanda Rothgardt, Inga Tidblad	Drama	
The Girls in Smaland	Flickorna i Småland	Schamyl Bauman	Sickan Carlsson, Åke Grönberg, Sigge Fürst	Drama	
The Happy Tailor	Den glade skräddaren	Gunnar Olsson	Edvard Persson, Mim Persson, Ivar Kåge	Comedy	
His Majesty Must Wait	Hans Majestat far vanta	Gustaf Edgren	Sture Lagerwall, Åke Söderblom, Aino Taube	Comedy	
Jolanta the Elusive Pig	Jolanta - den gäckande suggan	Hugo Bolander	Oscar Winge, Thor Modéen, Fritiof Billquist	Comedy	
The Journey Away	Resan bort	Alf Sjöberg	Gunn Wållgren, Holger Löwenadler, Maj-Britt Nilsson	Drama	
Man's Woman	Mans kvinna	Gunnar Skoglund	Edvin Adolphson, Birgit Tengroth, Holger Löwenadler	Drama	
Maria of Kvarngarden	Maria på Kvarngården	Arne Mattsson	Edvin Adolphson, Viveca Lindfors, Irma Christenson	Drama	
Motherhood	Moderskapets kval och lycka	Ivar Johansson	Birgit Rosengren, Björn Berglund, Allan Bohlin	Drama	
The Österman Brothers' Virago	Bröderna Östermans huskors	Ivar Johansson	Emy Hagman, Adolf Jahr, Artur Rolén	Comedy	
The Rose of Tistelön	Rosen på Tistelön	Åke Ohberg	Eva Henning, John Ekman, Arnold Sjöstrand	Historical	
The Serious Game	Den allvarsamma leken	Rune Carlsten	Viveca Lindfors, John Ekman, Olof Widgren	Drama	
Tired Theodore	Trötte Teodor	Anders Henrikson	Max Hansen, Annalisa Ericson, Tollie Zellman	Comedy	
Wandering with the Moon	Vandring med månen	Hasse Ekman	Eva Henning, Alf Kjellin, Stig Järrel	Drama	
Widower Jarl	Änkeman Jarl	Sigurd Wallén	Sigurd Wallén, Dagmar Ebbesen, Sven Magnusson	Comedy	

== 1946 ==
English Title	Swedish Title	Director	Cast	Genre	Notes
1946
Affairs of a Model	Det är min modell	Gustaf Molander	Maj-Britt Nilsson, Alf Kjellin, Olof Winnerstrand	Comedy	
The Balloon	Ballongen	Göran Gentele	Nils Poppe, Marianne Löfgren, Ingrid Borthen	Comedy	
The Bells of the Old Town	Klockorna i Gamla sta'n	Ragnar Hyltén-Cavallius	Edvard Persson, George Fant, Elsie Albiin	Drama	
Between Brothers	Bröder emellan	Börje Larsson	Max Hansen, Marianne Aminoff, Vibeke Falk	Comedy	
Brita in the Merchant's House	Brita i grosshandlarhuset	Åke Ohberg	George Fant, Eva Dahlbeck, Åke Grönberg	Drama	
Crisis	Kris	Ingmar Bergman	Marianne Löfgren, Inga Landgré, Stig Olin	Drama	
Desire	Begär	Edvin Adolphson	Edvin Adolphson, Gunn Wållgren, Carl Deurell	Drama	
Evening at the Djurgarden	Djurgårdskvällar	Rolf Husberg	Adolf Jahr, Emy Hagman, Nils Ericsson	Comedy	
Harald the Stalwart	Harald Handfaste	Hampe Faustman	George Fant, Georg Rydeberg, Elsie Albiin	Adventure	
Incorrigible	Rötägg	Arne Mattsson	Stig Olin, Stig Järrel, Marianne Löfgren	Drama	
Interlude	I dödens väntrum	Hasse Ekman	Viveca Lindfors, Hasse Ekman, Erik 'Bullen' Berglund	Drama	
Iris and the Lieutenant	Iris och löjtnantshjärta	Alf Sjoberg	Mai Zetterling, Alf Kjellin, Åke Claesson	Drama	
It Rains on Our Love	Det regnar på vår kärlek	Ingmar Bergman	Barbro Kollberg, Birger Malmsten	Drama	
Johansson and Vestman	Johansson och Vestman	Olof Molander	Holger Löwenadler, Sture Lagerwall, Wanda Rothgardt	Drama	
Kristin Commands	Kristin kommenderar	Gustaf Edgren	Dagmar Ebbesen, Wanda Rothgardt, Gunnar Björnstrand	Comedy	
Love Goes Up and Down	Kärlek och störtlopp	Rolf Husberg	Sture Lagerwall, Eva Dahlbeck, Thor Modéen	Comedy	
Meeting in the Night	Möte i natten	Hasse Ekman	Hasse Ekman, Eva Dahlbeck, Ulf Palme	Crime	
Money	Pengar	Nils Poppe	Nils Poppe, Inga Landgré, Elof Ahrle	Comedy	
Peggy on a Spree	Peggy på vift	Arne Mattsson	Marguerite Viby, Gunnar Björnstrand, Stig Järrel	Comedy	
Sunshine Follows Rain	Driver dagg faller regn	Gustaf Edgren	Mai Zetterling, Alf Kjellin, Sten Lindgren	Drama	
When the Meadows Blossom	När ängarna blommar	Hampe Faustman	Sigurd Wallén, Dagny Lind, Birger Malmsten	Drama	
While the Door Was Locked	Medan porten var stängd	Hasse Ekman	Tollie Zellman, Olof Winnerstrand, Inga Landgré	Drama	
Youth in Danger	Ungdom i fara	Per G. Holmgren	Kenne Fant, Gunnar Sjöberg, Sven-Eric Gamble	Drama	

== 1947 ==
English Title	Swedish Title	Director	Cast	Genre	Notes
1947
Bill Bergson, Master Detective	Mästerdetektiven Blomkvist	Rolf Husberg	Olle Johansson, Sven-Axel Carlsson, Bernt Callenbo	Mystery	
The Bride Came Through the Ceiling	Bruden kom genom taket	Bengt Palm	Annalisa Ericson, Stig Järrel, Karl-Arne Holmsten	Comedy	
Crime in the Sun	Brott i sol	Göran Gentele	Birger Malmsten, Gunnel Broström, Margareta Fahlén	Crime	
Dinner for Two	Supé för två	Ragnar Arvedson	Edvin Adolphson, Karin Ekelund, Gaby Stenberg	Comedy	
Don't Give Up	Tappa inte sugen	Lars-Eric Kjellgren	Nils Poppe, Annalisa Ericson, Gaby Stenberg	Musical	
Dynamite	Dynamit	Åke Ohberg	Birgit Tengroth, Bengt Ekerot, Marianne Löfgren	Crime	
The Girl from the Marsh Croft	Tösen från Stormyrtorpet	Gustaf Edgren	Margareta Fahlén, Alf Kjellin, Sten Lindgren	Drama	
A Guest Is Coming	Det kom en gäst...	Arne Mattsson	Sture Lagerwall, Karl-Arne Holmsten	Thriller	
How to Love	Konsten att älska	Gunnar Skoglund	Sture Lagerwall, Wanda Rothgardt, Lauritz Falk	Drama	
I Love You Karlsson	Jag älskar dig, Karlsson!	Lau Lauritzen	Marguerite Viby, Sture Lagerwall, Olof Winnerstrand	Comedy	
Jens Mansson in America	Jens Månsson i Amerika	Bengt Janzon	Edvard Persson, Stig Olin, Mim Persson	Comedy	
The Key and the Ring	Nyckeln och ringen	Anders Henrikson	Aino Taube, Lauritz Falk, Eva Dahlbeck	Comedy	
Life in the Finnish Woods	Livet i Finnskogarna	Ivar Johansson	Carl Jularbo, Naima Wifstrand, Barbro Ribbing	Drama	
The Loveliest Thing on Earth	Det vackraste på jorden	Anders Henrikson	Marianne Löfgren, Per Oscarsson, Inger Juel	Drama	
Maria	Maria	Gösta Folke	Maj-Britt Nilsson, George Fant, Stig Järrel	Drama	
Neglected by His Wife	Försummad av sin fru	Gösta Folke	Irma Christenson, Karl-Arne Holmsten, Agneta Prytz	Comedy	
The Night Watchman's Wife	Nattvaktens hustru	Bengt Palm	Åke Grönberg, Britta Holmberg, Sture Lagerwall	Drama	
No Way Back	Ingen väg tillbaka	Edvin Adolphson	Edvin Adolphson, Anita Björk, Gaby Stenberg	Drama	
One Swallow Does Not Make a Summer	En fluga gör ingen sommar	Hasse Ekman	Eva Henning, Sonja Wigert, Lauritz Falk	Comedy	
The People of Simlang Valley	Folket i Simlångsdalen	Åke Ohberg	Edvin Adolphson, Eva Dahlbeck, Arthur Fischer	Drama	
The Poetry of Ådalen	Ådalens poesi	Ivar Johansson	Adolf Jahr, Wilma Malmlöf, Nine-Christine Jönsson	Drama	
Poor Little Sven	Stackars lilla Sven	Hugo Bolander	Nils Poppe, Annalisa Ericson, Hjördis Petterson	Comedy	
Private Karlsson on Leave	91:an Karlssons permis	Gösta Bernhard, Hugo Bolander	Gus Dahlström, Holger Höglund, Fritiof Billquist	Comedy	
Rail Workers	Rallare	Arne Mattsson	Victor Sjöström, John Elfström, Gunnel Broström	Drama	
A Ship to India	Skepp till India land	Ingmar Bergman	Holger Löwenadler, Anna Lindahl, Birger Malmsten, Gertrud Fridh	Drama	
The Sixth Commandment	Sjätte budet	Stig Järrel	Ester Roeck Hansen, Gösta Cederlund, Ingrid Backlin	Drama	
Soldier's Reminder	Krigsmans erinran	Hampe Faustman	Elof Ahrle, Birgit Tengroth, Gunnar Björnstrand	Drama	
Song of Stockholm	Sången om Stockholm	Elof Ahrle	Alice Babs, Bengt Logardt, Åke Grönberg	Musical	
Two Women	Två kvinnor	Arnold Sjöstrand	Eva Dahlbeck, Cécile Ossbahr, Gunnar Björnstrand	Drama	Entered into the 1947 Cannes Film Festival
Wedding Night	Bröllopsnatten	Bodil Ipsen	Max Hansen, Sickan Carlsson, Inga Landgré	Comedy	
Woman Without a Face	Kvinna utan ansikte	Gustaf Molander	Alf Kjellin, Anita Björk, Gunn Wållgren	Drama	

== 1948 ==
English Title	Swedish Title	Director	Cast	Genre	Notes
1948
Carnival Evening	Marknadsafton	Ivar Johansson	Adolf Jahr, Emy Hagman, Sigge Fürst	Comedy	
Each Heart Has Its Own Story	Vart hjärta har sin saga	Bror Bügler	Edvard Persson, Inger Juel, Hilda Borgström	Historical	
Each to His Own Way	Var sin väg	Hasse Ekman	Gunn Wållgren, Hasse Ekman, Marianne Aminoff	Drama	
Eva	Eva	Gustaf Molander	Birger Malmsten, Eva Stiberg, Eva Dahlbeck	Drama	Screenplay by Ingmar Bergman
Foreign Harbour	Främmande hamn	Hampe Faustman	Adolf Jahr, George Fant, Carl Ström	Drama	Entered into the 1949 Cannes Film Festival
Girl from the Mountain Village	Flickan från fjällbyn	Anders Henrikson	Bengt Blomgren, Eva Dahlbeck, Carl Deurell	Drama	
I Am with You	Jag är med eder	Gösta Stevens	Victor Sjöström, Rune Lindström, Nils Dahlgren	Drama	
Lars Hård	Lars Hård	Hampe Faustman	George Fant, Adolf Jahr, Eva Dahlbeck	Drama	
Life at Forsbyholm Manor	Livet på Forsbyholm	Elof Ahrle, Arne Mattsson	Sickan Carlsson, Egon Larsson, Nils Ericsson	Comedy	
Life Starts Now	Nu börjar livet	Gustaf Molander	Mai Zetterling, Georg Rydeberg, Wanda Rothgardt	Drama	
Loffe as a Millionaire	Loffe som miljonär	Gösta Bernhard	Elof Ahrle, Sture Lagerwall, Irene Söderblom	Comedy	
Loffe the Tramp	Loffe på luffen	Gösta Werner	Elof Ahrle, Wiktor Andersson, Agneta Prytz	Comedy	
Music in Darkness	Musik i mörker	Ingmar Bergman	Mai Zetterling, Birger Malmsten, Rune Andréasson	Drama	
On These Shoulders	På dessa skuldror	Gösta Folke	Ulf Palme, Anita Björk, Holger Löwenadler	Drama	
Port of Call	Hamnstad	Ingmar Bergman	Nine-Christine Jönsson, Bengt Eklund, Mimi Nelson	Drama	
Private Bom	Soldat Bom	Lars-Eric Kjellgren	Nils Poppe, Inga Landgré, Gunnar Björnstrand	Comedy	
Robinson in Roslagen	Robinson i Roslagen	Schamyl Bauman	Adolf Jahr, Ludde Gentzel, Gull Natorp	Comedy	
Sin	Synd	Arnold Sjöstrand	Birgit Tengroth, Sture Lagerwall, Gunnar Sjöberg	Drama	
Sunshine	Solkatten	Gösta Werner	Annalisa Ericson, Nils Ericsson, Georg Funkquist	Drama	
A Swedish Tiger	En svensk tiger	Gustaf Edgren	Edvin Adolphson, Erik Berglund, Margareta Fahlén	War	

== 1949 ==
English Title	Swedish Title	Director	Cast	Genre	Notes
1949
Åsa-Nisse	Åsa-Nisse	Ragnar Frisk	John Elfström, Artur Rolén, Emy Hagman	Comedy	First of Åsa-Nisse series
Big Lasse of Delsbo	Lång-Lasse i Delsbo	Ivar Johansson	Sten Lindgren, Anna Lindahl, Ulla Andreasson	Drama	
Bohus Battalion	Bohus bataljon	Sölve Cederstrand, Arthur Spjuth	Per Grundén, Doris Svedlund, Gus Dahlström	Comedy	
Dangerous Spring	Farlig vår	Arne Mattsson	Karl-Arne Holmsten, Birger Malmsten, Jan Molander	Crime	
The Devil and the Smalander	Hin och smålänningen	Ivar Johansson	Stig Järrel, Sigge Fürst, Naima Wifstrand	Drama	
Father Bom	Pappa Bom	Lars-Eric Kjellgren	Nils Poppe, Gunnar Björnstrand, Sif Ruud	Comedy	
The Girl from the Third Row	Flickan från tredje raden	Hasse Ekman	Eva Henning, Hilda Borgström, Maj-Britt Nilsson	Comedy	
Love Wins Out	Kärleken segrar	Gustaf Molander	Karl-Arne Holmsten, Ingrid Thulin, Ilselil Larsen	Drama	
Number 17	Huset nr 17	Gösta Stevens	Edvard Persson, George Fant, Mimi Nelson	Crime	
Only a Mother	Bara en mor	Alf Sjoberg	Eva Dahlbeck, Ragnar Falck, Ulf Palme	Drama	
Pippi Longstocking	Pippi Långstrump	Per Gunvall	Viveca Serlachius, Benkt-Åke Benktsson, Sigge Fürst	Comedy	
Playing Truant	Skolka skolan	Schamyl Bauman	Sickan Carlsson, Gunnar Björnstrand, Olof Winnerstrand	Comedy	
Prison	Fängelse	Ingmar Bergman	Doris Svedlund, Birger Malmsten, Eva Henning	Drama	
Realm of Man	Människors rike	Gösta Folke	Ulf Palme, Anita Björk, Erik Hell	Drama	
Singoalla	Singoalla	Christian-Jaque	Viveca Lindfors, Alf Kjellin, Michel Auclair	Historical	Co-production with France
Son of the Sea	Havets son	Rolf Husberg	Per Oscarsson, Dagny Lind, John Elfström	Drama	
The Street	Gatan	Gösta Werner	Maj-Britt Nilsson, Peter Lindgren, Keve Hjelm	Drama	
Sven Tusan	Sven Tusan	Gösta Stevens	Edvard Persson, Emy Hagman, Gudrun Brost	Comedy	
The Swedish Horseman	Svenske ryttaren	Gustaf Edgren	Elisabeth Söderström, Kenne Fant, Åke Söderblom	Historical	
Thirst	Törst	Ingmar Bergman	Eva Henning, Birger Malmsten, Birgit Tengroth	Drama	
Vagabond Blacksmiths	Smeder på luffen	Hampe Faustman	Åke Fridell, Georg Skarstedt, Doris Svedlund	Drama	
Woman in White	Kvinna i vitt	Arne Mattsson	Margareta Fahlén, Georg Løkkeberg, Eva Dahlbeck	Drama	
