= A Difficult Parish =

1958 film

- Directed by: Emil A. Lingheim; Åke Ohlmarks
- Written by: Åke Ohlmarks; Hans Küntzel; Sten Broman
- Based on: A Difficult Parish by Axel Wallengren
- Starring: Knut Borglin; Hans Alfredson; Åke Ohlmarks
- Cinematography: Ingvar Borild; Jan Lindeström
- Music by: Sten Broman
- Production company: Europa Film
- Distributed by: Europa Film
- Release date: 24 November 1958
- Running time: 91 minutes
- Country: Sweden
- Language: Swedish

A Difficult Parish (Swedish: Ett svårskött pastorat) is a 1958 Swedish comedy film directed by Emil A. Lingheim and Åke Ohlmarks and featuring Knut Borglin, Hans Alfredson and Åke Ohlmarks. The cast included many non-professional actors. The film's sets were designed by the art director Arne Åkermark. Location shooting took place around Lund and Sjöbo in Scania. It is an adaptation of the 1895 short story of the same name by Axel Wallengren.

== Cast ==
- Knut Borglin as Calle Kula
- Hans Alfredson as Redaktör
- Erik Broman as Ägir Trulsson - dräng
- Sten Broman as Fridolf Fernelius - konsistorienotarie
- Maria Crona as Eurentia Glasberg - postfröken
- Gunnar Eneskär as Efraim Johansson - pastorsadjunkt
- Leif Ernhagen as Ebenezer Nilsson
- Crüll Fältström as Balder Hjönsson - dräng
- Mac Gustafsson as Asatorparen
- Hugo Hagander as Petter Lantz - korpral
- Daniel Hjort as Mormon-Mats / Höder
- Karl-Edvard Jeppsson as Andreas - kyrkoherde
- Bengt-Olof Landin as Länsman
- Clas Larsson as Goda Olsson
- Axel Liffner as Lundblom - redaktionssekreterare
- Folke Lind as Spuling
- Kim Meurling as Mattsson - kyrkvärd
- Börje Norrman as Sämund Holm - stins
- Åke Ohlmarks as 'Professorskan' - Calle Kulas hushållerska
- Anna Christina Ulfsparre as Pernilla - piga

== Bibliography ==
- Qvist, Per Olov & von Bagh, Peter. Guide to the Cinema of Sweden and Finland. Greenwood Publishing Group, 2000.
