= Wedding Night (1947 film) =

1947 film

- Directed by: Bodil Ipsen
- Written by: Sven Gustafson; Kar de Mumma
- Based on: Is Your Honeymoon Really Necessary? by Vivian Tidmarsh
- Starring: Max Hansen; Sickan Carlsson; Inga Landgré
- Cinematography: Hans Persson
- Edited by: Wic Kjellin
- Music by: Nathan Görling
- Production company: Europa Film
- Distributed by: Europa Film
- Release date: 5 February 1947
- Running time: 81 minutes
- Country: Sweden
- Language: Swedish

Wedding Night (Swedish: Bröllopsnatten) is a 1947 Swedish comedy film directed by Bodil Ipsen and starring Max Hansen, Sickan Carlsson and Inga Landgré. It was shot at the Sundbyberg Studios in Stockholm. The film's sets were designed by the art director Max Linder. It is an adaptation of the 1944 British play Is Your Honeymoon Really Necessary?.

== Synopsis ==
A man's plans to marry his fiancée are thwarted because he has not yet been divorced from his previous wife.

== Cast ==
- Max Hansen as Albert Lorentz
- Sickan Carlsson as Yvonne
- Inga Landgré as Mary
- Lauritz Falk as Rickard, lawyer
- John Botvid as Heming
- Julia Cæsar as Anna
- Sten Hedlund as Blom
- Solveig Lagström as Woman at the tea party
- Arne Lindblad as Berggren, wig maker

== Bibliography ==
- Krawc, Alfred. International Directory of Cinematographers, Set- and Costume Designers in Film: Denmark, Finland, Norway, Sweden (from the beginnings to 1984). Saur, 1986.
