= A Night at Glimmingehus =

1954 film

- Directed by: Torgny Wickman
- Written by: Stig Dagerman; John Nihlén; Åke Ohlmarks
- Starring: Edvard Persson; Bibi Andersson; Bengt Logardt
- Cinematography: Rune Ericson
- Edited by: Wic Kjellin
- Music by: Egon Kjerrman
- Production company: Europa Film
- Distributed by: Europa Film
- Release date: 26 December 1954
- Running time: 93 minutes
- Country: Sweden
- Language: Swedish

A Night at Glimmingehus (Swedish: En natt på Glimmingehus) is a 1954 Swedish comedy film directed by Torgny Wickman and starring Edvard Persson, Bibi Andersson and Bengt Logardt. It was shot at the Sundbyberg Studios of Europa Film in Stockholm.

== Synopsis ==
A university professor comes to spend his summer vacation at the castle of Glimmingehus.

== Cast ==
- Edvard Persson as Nils Jeppsen
- Bibi Andersson as Maj Månsson
- Bengt Logardt as Holger Broman
- Torsten Lilliecrona as Jesper Stenswärd
- Nils Hallberg as Botolf
- Gunilla Åkerréhn as Anne Stenswärd / Ingeborg Stenswärd
- Harry Persson as Persson
- Ingeborg Nyberg as Inga-Lill
- Brita Ulfberg as Marguerite Lenning
- Sten Gester as van Düren
- Astrid Bodin as Alma Månson
- Ove Flodin as Svensson
- Gun Holmqvist as Mrs. Stenswärd
- Gunilla Kreuger as Gullan
- Algot Larsson as G. Månsson
- Max Lorentz as Page
- Jan von Zweigbergk as Göran Stenswärd

== Bibliography ==
- Qvist, Per Olov & von Bagh, Peter. Guide to the Cinema of Sweden and Finland. Greenwood Publishing Group, 2000.
