= Count Svensson =

- Directed by: Emil A. Lingheim
- Written by: Margit Beckman; Åke Ohlmarks
- Starring: Edvard Persson; Mim Persson; Barbro Hiort af Ornäs
- Cinematography: Bertil Palmgren
- Edited by: Wic Kjellin
- Music by: Sten Broman
- Production company: Europa Film
- Release date: 26 December 1951
- Running time: 93 minutes
- Country: Sweden
- Language: Swedish

Count Svensson (Swedish: Greve Svensson) is a 1951 Swedish comedy film directed by Emil A. Lingheim and starring real-life couple Edvard Persson, Mim Persson, playing husband and wife, and Barbro Hiort af Ornäs.

The film's sets were designed by the art director Arne Åkermark.

== Main cast ==
- Edvard Persson as Anders Svensson
- Mim Persson as Stina Svensson
- Barbro Hiort af Ornäs as Greta Svensson
- Ivar Wahlgren as Ville Lundgren
- Bengt Logardt as Sven Lindström
- Siv Thulin as Lisa Fransson
- Toivo Pawlo as Leijonstedt
- Hans Hugold von Schwerin as himself
- Poul Juhl as 'Count' Nordencrone
- Astrid Kraa as Trine
- Ellen Jansø as Ilse, police woman
- Carl Johan Hviid as Policeman

== Bibliography ==
- Qvist, Per Olov & von Bagh, Peter. Guide to the Cinema of Sweden and Finland. Greenwood Publishing Group, 2000.
