= When the Mills are Running =

1956 film

- Directed by: Bengt Järrel
- Written by: Åke Ohlmarks; Henry Richter
- Produced by: Olle Brunaeus
- Starring: Edvard Persson; Ingeborg Nyberg; Börje Mellvig
- Cinematography: Jan Lindeström
- Edited by: Wic Kjellin
- Music by: Harry Arnold
- Production company: Europa Film
- Distributed by: Europa Film
- Release date: 26 December 1956
- Country: Sweden
- Language: Swedish

When the Mills are Running (Swedish: Där möllorna gå) is a 1956 Swedish film directed by Bengt Järrel and starring Edvard Persson, Ingeborg Nyberg and Börje Mellvig. It was shot at the Sundbyberg Studios in Stockholm and on location in the Netherlands. The film's sets were designed by the art director Arne Åkermark.

This was the last film that Edvard Persson appeared in.

== Cast ==
- Edvard Persson as Blomster-Pelle Pettersson
- Ingeborg Nyberg as Bella
- Börje Mellvig as Kurt Brennerth
- Mimi Nelson as Mrs. Ina Brennerth
- Harry Ahlin as Fredrik Storm
- Stina Ståhle as Hilda Storm
- Kristina Adolphson as Greta
- Kenneth Bergström as Olle Bergzell
- Karl Erik Flens as Kalle Träff
- Fred Gerle as Hasse Johansson
- Nils Kihlberg as Björn Johansson
- Kolbjörn Knudsen as Frithiof Bergzell
- Gerard Lindqvist as Georg Svensson
- Curt Löwgren as Policeman Pettersson
- Maritta Marke as Vivan Borglund
- Toivo Pawlo as Fritz Jönsson
- Mim Persson as Mrs. Frideborg Bergzell
- Gösta Prüzelius as Sidenius
- Olav Riégo as Speaker
- Hendrik Roessingh as Tjerk Hendrik van Schouten
- Gunnel Wadner as Mrs. Eva Sidenius

== Bibliography ==
- Qvist, Per Olov & von Bagh, Peter. Guide to the Cinema of Sweden and Finland. Greenwood Publishing Group, 2000.
