= The Women Around Larsson =

1934 film

- Directed by: Schamyl Bauman
- Written by: Gideon Wahlberg; Schamyl Bauman
- Starring: Edvard Persson; Gideon Wahlberg; Katie Rolfsen; Dagmar Ebbesen
- Cinematography: Harald Berglund
- Edited by: Emil A. Lingheim
- Music by: Erik Baumann
- Production company: Europa Film
- Distributed by: Europa Film
- Release date: 26 December 1934
- Running time: 104 minutes
- Country: Sweden
- Language: Swedish

The Women Around Larsson (Swedish: Kvinnorna kring Larsson) is a 1934 Swedish drama film directed by Schamyl Bauman and starring Edvard Persson, Gideon Wahlberg and Katie Rolfsen. It was shot at the Sundbyberg Studios of Europa Film in Stockholm. The film's art direction was by Bibi Lindström.

== Synopsis ==
A blacksmith rescues a young sailor who has been beaten up in the street and takes him home and gives him a job as his apprentice. The young man later turns out to be an aristocrat who has run away from home.

== Cast ==
- Edvard Persson as Lasse Larsson
- Gideon Wahlberg as Johan Jansson
- Katie Rolfsen as Sara Larsson
- Dagmar Ebbesen as Mia Sohlström
- Nils Lundell as Dahlgren
- Birgit Rosengren as Birgit Jansson
- Sture Lagerwall as Arne Lindberg
- Nils Wahlbom as Müller
- Hugo Björne as Cavalry captain Ahrenskiöld
- Alice Carlsson as Eva Ahrenskiöld
- Holger Löwenadler as Detective
- Jullan Jonsson as Ahrenskiöld's Maid

== Bibliography ==
- Larsson, Mariah & Marklund, Anders. Swedish Film: An Introduction and Reader. Nordic Academic Press, 2010.
