= Stopp! Tänk på något annat =

1944 film

- Directed by: Åke Ohberg
- Written by: Olle Hedberg
- Starring: Eva Henning; Hasse Ekman; Olof Winnerstrand
- Music by: Nathan Görling; Zilas Görling; Charles Redland; Miff Görling; Willard Ringstrand
- Distributed by: Europafilm
- Release date: 1944
- Running time: 108 minutes
- Country: Sweden
- Language: Swedish

Stopp! Tänk på något annat (English: Stop! Think of something else) is a 1944 Swedish drama film directed by Åke Ohberg.

== Plot summary ==
Karsten falls in love with Sonja, she rejects him, but not because of lack of interest. She travels to France and he goes after her. They get to know each other and become close. When Karsten has to travel back home again he fails to persuade her to come along with him. When she finally returns he continues his courtship. Sonja does not trust Karsten, but she soon realizes that he has matured considerably and she decides to start a relationship with him.

== Cast ==
- Eva Henning as Sonja Strömbeck
- Hasse Ekman as Karsten Kirsewetter
- Olof Winnerstrand as Wilhelm Kirsewetter, Karstens father
- Hjördis Petterson as Henriette Kirsewetter, Karstens mother
- Ingrid Backlin as Annemari Tirén
- Anders Ek as Mårten Bergfelt
- Hugo Björne as Oscar Patrik Tirén, priest, Annemaries far
- Gösta Cederlund as Hans Strömbäck, Sonjas father
- Marianne Löfgren as Mrs. Strömbeck, Sonjas mother
- Marianne Gyllenhammar as Lisbeth
- Curt Masreliez as Hasse af Stråhlberg
- Nina Scenna as Hilma, Kirsewetters maid
- Magnus Kesster as Frans Kvist
- Constance Gibson as Lotten, Lisbeths grandmother
