= The Red Horses =

The Red Horses may refer to:

- The Red Horses (1950 film), Danish film
- The Red Horses (1954 film), Swedish film
