= Kalle's Inn =

1939 film

- Directed by: Emil A. Lingheim
- Written by: Theodor Berthels; Edvard Persson; Henry Richter; Erik Zetterström
- Starring: Edvard Persson; Bullan Weijden; John Degerberg
- Cinematography: Olle Ekman
- Edited by: Emil A. Lingheim
- Music by: Nathan Görling
- Production company: Europa Film
- Release date: 4 November 1939
- Running time: 95 minutes
- Country: Sweden
- Language: Swedish

Kalle's Inn (Swedish:Kalle på Spången) is a 1939 Swedish comedy film directed by Emil A. Lingheim and starring Edvard Persson, Bullan Weijden and John Degerberg.

The film's sets were designed by the art director Max Linder.

== Cast ==
- Edvard Persson as Kalle Jeppsson
- Bullan Weijden as Berta Jeppsson
- John Degerberg as Captain Sjölund
- Carl Ström as Constable Högberg
- Tord Bernheim as Gösta Högberg
- Mim Persson as Stina
- Anita Gyldtenungæ as Karin
- Walter Sarmell as Mjölnar-Olle
- Olga Hellqvist as Hortensia Kraft
- Harry Persson as Oskar Olsson
- Knut Borglin as Student Leader
- Ingrid Buhre as Female Student
- Alfhild Degerberg as En kvinna
- Georg Funkquist as American

== Bibliography ==
- Mariah Larsson & Anders Marklund. Swedish Film: An Introduction and Reader. Nordic Academic Press, 2010.
