= Flens =

Flens is a surname. Notable people with the surname include:

- Karl Erik Flens, Swedish actor
- Rick Flens, Dutch cyclist
