= Time of Desire =

1954 film

- Directed by: Egil Holmsen
- Written by: Egil Holmsen
- Based on: The Horse Dealer's Daughters by Artur Lundkvist
- Starring: Barbro Larsson; Margaretha Löwler; George Fant
- Cinematography: Ingvar Borild
- Edited by: Wic Kjellin
- Music by: Harry Arnold
- Production company: Europa Film
- Distributed by: Europa Film
- Release date: 20 November 1954
- Running time: 81 minutes
- Country: Sweden
- Language: Swedish

Time of Desire or The Horse Dealer's Daughters (Swedish: Hästhandlarens flickor) is a 1954 Swedish drama film directed by Egil Holmsen and starring Barbro Larsson, Margaretha Löwler and George Fant. It was shot at the Sundbyberg Studios of Europa Film in Stockholm and on location around Örsundsbro in Uppsala County. It was based on a 1935 short story by Artur Lundkvist. The film's sets were designed by the art director Arne Åkermark. In 1959, it was released on the American art house market by Janus Films.

== Synopsis ==
Two daughters of a roguish horse trader have very different personalities but are emotionally close. When one of them takes up with a young man she encounters it drives her sister jealous.

== Cast ==
- Barbro Larsson as Lilly Lilja
- Margaretha Löwler as Ragni Lilja
- George Fant as Lilja
- Birger Malmsten as Algot Wiberg
- Nils Hallberg as Nils
- Marianne Löfgren as Mrs. Johansson
- Inga Gill as Ella
- Ingemar Pallin as Paul Berger
- Harry Persson as Kalle
- Wiktor Andersson as Old-John
- Gösta Bernhard as Berg

== Bibliography ==
- Wallengren, Ann-Kristin. Welcome Home Mr Swanson: Swedish Emigrants and Swedishness on Film. Nordic Academic Press, 2014.
- Wright, Rochelle. The Visible Wall: Jews and Other Ethnic Outsiders in Swedish Film. SIU Press, 1998.
