= Pimpernel Svensson =

1950 film directed by Emil A. Lingheim

- Directed by: Emil A. Lingheim
- Written by: Åke Ohlmarks; Margit Beckman; Baroness Emmuska Orczy (novel)
- Produced by: Otto Scheutz
- Starring: Edvard Persson; Ivar Wahlgren; Aurore Palmgren
- Cinematography: Karl-Erik Alberts
- Edited by: Wic Kjellin
- Music by: Knut Edgardt; Erik Baumann; Nathan Görling
- Production company: Europa Film
- Release date: 30 August 1950
- Running time: 80 minutes
- Country: Sweden
- Language: Swedish

Pimpernel Svensson is a 1950 Swedish comedy film directed by Emil A. Lingheim and starring Edvard Persson, Ivar Wahlgren and Aurore Palmgren. It was made at the Stockholm studios of Europa Film and on location in Skåne. Arne Åkermark was its art director.

== Synopsis ==
In an updating of The Scarlet Pimpernel, a Swede travels to Stettin in 1945 to rescue his nephew who has been trapped in the Soviet-occupied port.

== Cast ==
- Edvard Persson as Anders 'Pimpernel' Svensson
- Ivar Wahlgren as Ville Lundgren
- Aurore Palmgren as Willy's Mother
- Gunnel Wadner as Willy's Wife
- Arne Wirén as General Badajsky
- Rodja Persidsky as Major Pusjkin
- Algot Larsson as August Andersson
- Signe Wirff as Refugee
- Ove Flodin as Pålson
- John Degerberg as Bell-ringer
- Walter Sarmell as Station Master
- Frans Begger as Russian Soldier
- Svea Holst as Pimpernel's Maid
- Minna Larsson as Karla Andersson
- Inger Sotnikov as Girl in Stettin
- Mikael Sotnikov as Schultze
- Maj-Britt Thörn as Prostitute

== Bibliography ==
- Qvist, Per Olov & von Bagh, Peter. Guide to the Cinema of Sweden and Finland. Greenwood Publishing Group, 2000.
