= Erik Baumann =

Swedish composer

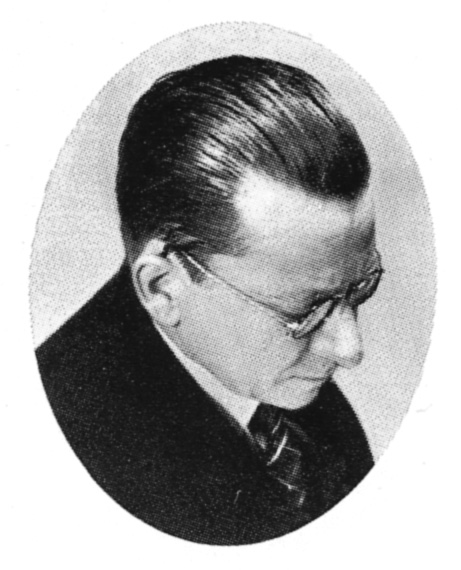
- Born: 30 October 1889; Vimmerby, Sweden
- Died: 25 November 1955 (aged 66); Boo, Sweden
- Occupation: Composer
- Years active: 1930–1954 (film)

Erik Baumann (October 30, 1889 – November 25, 1955) was a Swedish composer of the film scores. He spent a number of years working at the Sundbyberg Studios of Europa Film He was the brother of the film director Schamyl Bauman.

== Selected filmography ==
- The Red Day (1931)
- The Southsiders (1932)
- Secret Svensson (1933)
- Fridolf in the Lion's Den (1933)
- Saturday Nights (1933)
- The Women Around Larsson (1934)
- Close Relations (1935)
- Our Boy (1936)
- South of the Highway (1936)
- The Quartet That Split Up (1936)
- Raggen (1936)
- Storm Over the Skerries (1938)
- Baldwin's Wedding (1938)
- Sun Over Sweden (1938)
- For Better, for Worse (1938)
- We at Solglantan (1939)
- Frestelse (1940)
- Hanna in Society (1940)
- Heroes in Yellow and Blue (1940)
- Lasse-Maja (1941)
- Adventurer (1942)
- We House Slaves (1942)
- A Girl for Me (1943)
- The People of Hemsö (1944)
- Skipper Jansson (1944)
- Widower Jarl (1945)
- Meeting in the Night (1946)
- One Swallow Does Not Make a Summer (1947)
- Each to His Own Way (1948)
- Number 17 (1949)
- Pimpernel Svensson (1950)
- Restaurant Intim (1950)

== Bibliography ==
- Porter, Jack W. & Henrysson, Harald. A Jussi Bjoerling Discography. Jussi Bjoerling Memorial Archive, 1982.
