= Turn of the Century (film) =

1944 film

- Directed by: Gunnar Olsson
- Written by: Karl Gustav Ossiannilsson; Henry Richter; Kar de Mumma
- Based on: Slätten by Karl Gustav Ossiannilsson
- Starring: Edvard Persson; Stina Hedberg; Marianne Gyllenhammar
- Cinematography: Sven Thermænius
- Edited by: Gösta Bjurman
- Music by: Alvar Kraft
- Production company: Europa Film
- Distributed by: Europa Film
- Release date: 26 December 1944
- Running time: 114 minutes
- Country: Sweden
- Language: Swedish

Turn of the Century (Swedish: När seklet var ungt) is a 1944 Swedish drama film directed by Gunnar Olsson and starring Edvard Persson, Stina Hedberg and Marianne Gyllenhammar. It was shot at the Sundbyberg Studios and on location around Viken and Lessebo. The film's sets were designed by the art director Max Linder.

== Synopsis ==
At the beginning of the twentieth century in Scania a large-scale farmer hires in cheap immigrant labourers to work his lands, leading to unemployment among the locals. At the same time a new schoolteacher arrives with socialist leanings. He champions the rights of the farmhands and falls in love with the daughter of the squire.

== Cast ==
- Edvard Persson as Squire Munthe
- Stina Hedberg as Mrs. Munthe
- Marianne Gyllenhammar as Hillevi Munthe
- Claes Thelander as Yngve Sjöö
- Walter Sarmell as Ferdinand
- Mim Persson as Hanna
- Fritiof Billquist as Meier
- Ivar Kåge as Severin
- John Norrman as Fahlen
- Nils Nordståhl as Läns
- Erik Rosén as Vicar
- Axel Högel as Policeman
- Bullan Weijden as Malin
- Karl Erik Flens as The Limp
- Karl Nygren-Kloster as Mats

== Bibliography ==
- Paietta, Ann C. Teachers in the Movies: A Filmography of Depictions of Grade School, Preschool and Day Care Educators, 1890s to the Present. McFarland, 2007.
