= For Better, for Worse (1938 film) =

1938 film

- Directed by: Ivar Johansson
- Written by: John Olsen; Ivar Johansson
- Starring: Sten Lindgren; Mona Mårtenson; Rolf Botvid
- Cinematography: Harald Berglund; Olle Ekman
- Edited by: Emil A. Lingheim
- Music by: Erik Baumann
- Production company: Europa Film
- Distributed by: Europa Film
- Release date: 12 September 1938
- Running time: 79 minutes
- Country: Sweden
- Language: Swedish

For Better, for Worse (Swedish: I nöd och lust) is a 1938 Swedish drama film directed by Ivar Johansson and starring Sten Lindgren, Mona Mårtenson and Rolf Botvid. It was shot at the Sundbyberg Studios of Europa Film in Stockholm. Location shooting took place in Greenland and off the coast of Norway. The film's sets were designed by the art director Max Linder.

== Synopsis ==
A veteran trapper sits reflectively by the sickbed of his wife and recalls the more than thirty years they have spent together.

== Cast ==
- Sten Lindgren as Olaf Ruud
- Mona Mårtenson as Anna Ruud
- Rolf Botvid as Erik Ruud
- Sven Bergvall as Halvorsen
- Bror Olsson as Doctor
- Martin Ericsson as Priest
- Märta Dorff as Nurse
- Linnéa Hillberg as Mother Olsen

== Bibliography ==
- Qvist, Per Olov & von Bagh, Peter. Guide to the Cinema of Sweden and Finland. Greenwood Publishing Group, 2000.
