= Close Relations (1935 film) =

1935 film

- Directed by: Sölve Cederstrand
- Written by: Sölve Cederstrand; Gideon Wahlberg
- Produced by: Olle Brunaeus
- Starring: Edvard Persson; Gideon Wahlberg; Dagmar Ebbesen
- Cinematography: Harald Berglund; Hilding Bladh
- Edited by: Emil A. Lingheim
- Music by: Sten Axelsson; Erik Baumann; Edvin Ziedner
- Production company: Europa Film
- Distributed by: Europa Film
- Release date: 9 March 1935
- Running time: 105 minutes
- Country: Sweden
- Language: Swedish

Close Relations (Swedish: Tjocka släkten) is a 1935 Swedish comedy film directed by Sölve Cederstrand and starring Edvard Persson, Gideon Wahlberg and Dagmar Ebbesen. It was shot at the Sundbyberg Studios of Europa Film in Stockholm.

== Cast ==
- Edvard Persson as Lasse Larsson
- Gideon Wahlberg as Johan Jansson
- Dagmar Ebbesen as Fina Jansson
- Alice Carlsson as Laila
- Rut Holm as Mabel
- Carl-Gunnar Wingård as Fredrik
- Lili Ziedner as Sally
- Martin Sterner as Consul General Jansson
- Nils Jacobsson as Axel
- Helle Winther as Kolumbus
- Bertil Berglund as Burglar
- Astrid Bodin as Lisa, maid
- Estery Ericsson as Train passenger
- Curt Lundvik as Axel's friend
- Aurora Åström as Laila's friend

== Bibliography ==
- Wallengren, Ann-Kristin. Welcome Home Mr Swanson: Swedish Emigrants and Swedishness on Film. Nordic Academic Press, 2014.
