= Sven Tusan =

- Directed by: Gösta Stevens
- Written by: Fritiof Nilsson Piraten
- Starring: Edvard Persson; Emy Hagman; Sigbrit Molin
- Cinematography: Karl-Erik Alberts
- Edited by: Wic Kjellin
- Music by: Sten Broman
- Production company: Europa Film
- Release date: 12 February 1949
- Country: Sweden
- Language: Swedish

Sven Tusan is a 1949 Swedish comedy film directed by Gösta Stevens and starring Edvard Persson, Emy Hagman and Sigbrit Molin.

== Cast ==
- Edvard Persson as Sven 'Tusan' Jönsson
- Emy Hagman as Irma
- Sigbrit Molin as Britt-Marie
- Axel Högel as Nelson
- Erik Molin as Verner Berglund
- Douglas Håge as Simmer
- Gudrun Brost as Mrs. Winsten
- Margit Andelius as Woman
- Astrid Bodin as Cleaning woman
- Helga Brofeldt as Woman dressed in black
- Anne-Marie Eek
- Lars Kåge
- Mim Persson as One of the Flink sisters, telephone operator
- Artur Rolén as Man
- Hanny Schedin as One of the Flink sisters, telephone operator

== Bibliography ==
- Qvist, Per Olov & von Bagh, Peter. Guide to the Cinema of Sweden and Finland. Greenwood Publishing Group, 2000.
