= A Sailor on Horseback =

- Swedish: En sjöman till häst
- Directed by: Emil A. Lingheim
- Written by: Theodor Berthels; Fredrik Lindholm (play); Edvard Persson; Henry Richter; Erik Zetterström
- Starring: Edvard Persson; Karl-Arne Holmsten; Elvin Ottoson
- Cinematography: Harald Berglund
- Edited by: Emil A. Lingheim
- Music by: Alvar Kraft
- Production company: Europa Film
- Release date: 26 December 1940
- Running time: 105 minutes
- Country: Sweden
- Language: Swedish

A Sailor on Horseback (Swedish: En sjöman till häst) is a 1940 Swedish comedy film directed by Emil A. Lingheim and starring Edvard Persson, Karl-Arne Holmsten and Elvin Ottoson.

The film's art direction was by Max Linder.

== Main cast ==
- Edvard Persson as Lasse Borg
- Karl-Arne Holmsten as Karl Gustav Bremberg
- Elvin Ottoson as Baron Axel von Berger
- Olga Andersson as Mrs. von Berger
- Elly Christiansson as Paula von Berger
- Per Björkman as Baron Bengt von Kransvärd
- Ivar Kåge as Lawyer
- Bullan Weijden as Mina
- Mim Persson as Mrs. Ek
- Ernst Malmquist as Larsson

== Bibliography ==
- Qvist, Per Olov & von Bagh, Peter. Guide to the Cinema of Sweden and Finland. Greenwood Publishing Group, 2000.
