= Per Sjöstrand =

Swedish actor, script writer and director

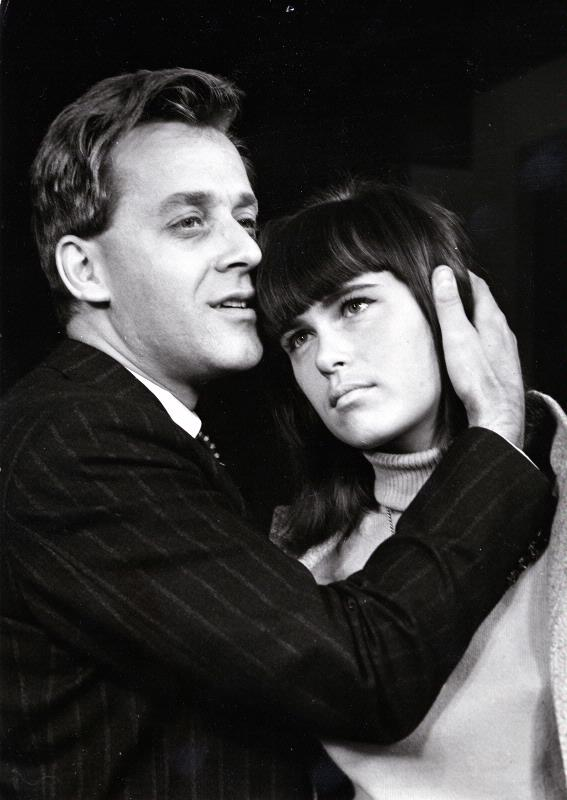
Per Sjöstrand

Nils Per Erik Sjöstrand (29 June 1930, Stockholm – 25 October 2008, Viken) was a Swedish actor, script writer and director.

== Partial filmography ==
- Jens Mansson in America (1947) - Policeman (uncredited)
- Trots (1952) - Student (uncredited)
- Unmarried Mothers (1953) - Erik Eliasson
- The Shadow (1953) - Press Photographer
- Café Lunchrasten (1954) - Arty student (uncredited)
- Violence (1955) - Sjunnesson
- Kärlek på turné (1955) - Teddy
- Stage Entrance (1956) - Sven, acting student
- Wild Strawberries (1957) - Sigfrid Borg
- The Jazz Boy (1958) - Armand i 'Kameliadamen'
- Fröken Chic (1959) - Stage Manager (uncredited)
- Who Saw Him Die? (1968) - Headmaster
- The Touch (1971) - Therapist (uncredited)
- Agaton Sax och Byköpings gästabud (1976) - Mosca / McSnuff (voice)
- Bluff Stop (1977) - Journalist
- Mio in the Land of Faraway (1987) - Eno / Carpetbeater (Swedish version, voice)
- Four Days that shook Sweden - The Midsummer Crisis 1941 (1988, TV Movie documentary) - Gösta Bagge
- Där regnbågen slutar (1999) - Bankdirektören (final fim role)
