= John Degerberg =

Swedish actor (1892–1972)

- Born: John Edvin Larsson Degerberg; 27 March 1892; Lund, Sweden
- Died: 29 July 1972 (aged 80); Malmö, Sweden
- Occupation: Actor
- Years active: 1928-1950 (film)

John Degerberg (27 March 1892 – 29 July 1972) was a Swedish stage and film actor.

== Selected filmography ==
- South of the Highway (1936)
- Julia jubilerar (1938)
- Kalle's Inn (1939)
- Pimpernel Svensson (1950)

== Bibliography ==
- Qvist, Per Olov & von Bagh, Peter. Guide to the Cinema of Sweden and Finland. Greenwood Publishing Group, 2000.
