= Sven Bergvall =

Swedish actor

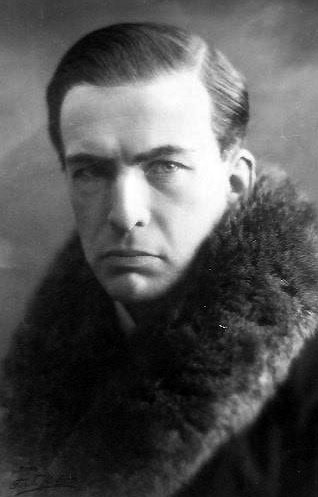
- Born: 25 May 1881; Västerfärnebo
- Died: 2 November 1960 (aged 79); Stockholm
- Occupation: Actor

Sven Bergvall (25 May 1881 – 2 November 1960) was a Swedish actor.

== Biography ==
Bergvall made his stage debut in 1901 and was since 1917 at the Dramaten. He acted in Swedish films from 1914 to 1954.

He fought energetically for the actors' professional organization. In 1913 he married the actress Anna Sofia Rosén.

== Selected filmography ==
- Gatans barn (1914)
- Ingmar's Inheritance (1925)
- The Lady of the Camellias (1925)
- She Is the Only One (1926)
- The Realm of the Rye (1929)
- People of Hälsingland (1933)
- Man's Way with Women (1934)
- Conflict (1937)
- For Better, for Worse (1938)
- Emilie Högquist (1939)
- Mot nya tider (1939)
- The Three of Us (1940)
- Scanian Guerilla (1941)
- If I Could Marry the Minister (1941)
- Doctor Glas (1942)
- Ride Tonight! (1942)
- Life in the Country (1943)
- Gentleman with a Briefcase (1943)
- Young Blood (1943)
- Elvira Madigan (1943)
- His Excellency (1944)
- My People Are Not Yours (1944)
- The Happy Tailor (1945)
- Affairs of a Model (1946)
- Evening at the Djurgarden (1946)
- The People of Simlang Valley (1947)
- The Girl from the Marsh Croft (1947)
- Rail Workers (1947)
