= Alvar Kraft =

Swedish composer (1901–1959)

- Born: 19 September 1901
- Died: 28 September 1959 (aged 58)
- Occupation: Composer
- Years active: 1939-1956 (film)

Alvar Kraft (19 September 1901 – 28 September 1959) was a Swedish pianist, bandleader and composer. His compositions included film music and popular songs. He was married to the actress Bullan Weijden.

He toured with singer Edvard Persson as his accompanist.

== Selected filmography ==
- Bashful Anton (1940)
- A Sailor on Horseback (1940)
- Sunny Sunberg (1941)
- Sun Over Klara (1942)
- Life in the Country (1943)
- Turn of the Century (1944)
- The Happy Tailor (1945)
- The Bells of the Old Town (1946)
- Jens Mansson in America (1947)
- Each Heart Has Its Own Story (1948)

== Bibliography ==
- Qvist, Per Olov & von Bagh, Peter. Guide to the Cinema of Sweden and Finland. Greenwood Publishing Group, 2000.
