= The Happy Tailor =

1945 film

- Directed by: Gunnor Olsson
- Written by: Jacob Bergqvist; Edvard Persson; Erik Zetterström
- Starring: Edvard Persson; Mim Persson; Marianne Gyllenhammar
- Cinematography: Sven Thermænius
- Edited by: Emil A. Lingheim
- Music by: Alvar Kraft
- Production company: Europa Film
- Release date: 26 December 1945
- Running time: 106 minutes
- Country: Sweden
- Language: Swedish

The Happy Tailor (Swedish:Den glade skräddaren) is a 1945 Swedish comedy film directed by Gunnar Olsson and starring Edvard Persson, Mim Persson and Marianne Gyllenhammar.

The film's art direction was by Max Linder.

== Main cast ==
- Edvard Persson as Sören Sörenson
- Mim Persson as Boel Sörenson
- Marianne Gyllenhammar as Anne-Marie
- Ivar Kåge as Anders Bengt
- Sture Djerf as Gunnar
- Sven Bergvall as Sten
- Ernst Wellton as Ingvar
- Fritiof Billquist as Innkeeper
- Carl Deurell as Mayor
- Algot Larsson as Tok-Lars
- Harald Svensson as Pihlquist
- Josua Bengtson as Vicar
- Birgitta Hoppeler as Daughter of Sören and Boel
- Gunnel Nilsson as Daughter of Sören and Boel

== Bibliography ==
- Qvist, Per Olov & von Bagh, Peter. Guide to the Cinema of Sweden and Finland. Greenwood Publishing Group, 2000.
