= The Boys of Number Fifty Seven =

1935 film

- Directed by: Ivar Johansson
- Written by: Gideon Wahlberg (play); Ivar Johansson
- Starring: Julia Cæsar; Britta Brunius; Tord Bernheim
- Cinematography: Ernst Westerberg
- Edited by: Ivar Johansson
- Music by: Sune Waldimir
- Production company: Film AB Suecia
- Distributed by: Sveriges Biografägares Distributionsbyrå
- Release date: 26 December 1935
- Running time: 90 minutes
- Country: Sweden
- Language: Swedish

The Boys of Number Fifty Seven (Swedish: Grabbarna i 57:an) is a 1935 Swedish comedy film directed by Ivar Johansson and starring Julia Cæsar, Britta Brunius and Tord Bernheim. It focuses on the various residents of a boarding house in the Södermalm district of Stockholm.

== Cast ==
- Julia Cæsar as Sofia Dahlberg
- Britta Brunius as Lisa Dahlberg
- Tord Bernheim as Gösta
- Sten Lindgren as Karl-Göran Dahlberg
- Disa Gillis as Greta
- Emy Hagman as Vivan
- Sven-Olof Sandberg as Svenne
- Elof Ahrle as Fabian Karlsson
- Alf Östlund as Vicke Vallin
- Siegfried Fischer as Oscar Dahlberg
- Ludde Juberg as Blomkvist
- Arthur Fischer as Mellgren
- Artur Cederborgh as Police inspector Bergström
- Bror Berger as Hoodlum
- Gösta Bodin as Police inspector
- Tyra Dörum as Aunt Malvina
- Bertil Ehrenmark as Häng-Lasse
- Wictor Hagman as Hoodlum
- Nils Hallberg as Kalle
- Carl Harald as Hoodlum
- Erik Johansson as Inspector Lundberg
- Holger Löwenadler as Hoodlum's leader
- Otto Malmberg as Hoodlum
- Harry Persson as 'Lasse Sledgehammer' - Hoodlum
- Robert Ryberg as Hoodlum

== Bibliography ==
- Larsson, Mariah & Marklund, Anders. Swedish Film: An Introduction and Reader. Nordic Academic Press, 2010.
- Qvist, Per Olov & von Bagh, Peter. Guide to the Cinema of Sweden and Finland. Greenwood Publishing Group, 2000.
