= The Loveliest Thing on Earth =

1947 film

- Directed by: Anders Henrikson
- Written by: Bertil Malmberg
- Starring: Anders Henrikson; Marianne Löfgren; Per Oscarsson; Inger Juel
- Cinematography: Harald Berglund
- Edited by: Emil A. Lingheim
- Music by: Herbert Sandberg
- Production company: Europa Film
- Distributed by: Europa Film
- Release date: 15 September 1947
- Running time: 110 minutes
- Country: Sweden
- Language: Swedish

The Loveliest Thing on Earth (Swedish: Det vackraste på jorden) is a 1947 Swedish drama film directed by and starring Anders Henrikson and also featuring Marianne Löfgren, Per Oscarsson and Inger Juel. It was shot at the Sundbyberg Studios of Europa Film in Stockholm and on location in the city. The film's sets were designed by the art director Max Linder.

== Cast ==
- Anders Henrikson as Georg Isakson
- Marianne Löfgren as Greta Isakson
- Per Oscarsson as Tomas Isakson
- Erik Hell as Bengt Kahlman
- Inger Juel as Karin Kahlman
- Stig Järrel as Tobacconist Frithiof
- Irma Christenson as Tilda
- Ann Westerlund as Elsa
- Kenne Fant as Göran Thome

== Bibliography ==
- Qvist, Per Olov & von Bagh, Peter. Guide to the Cinema of Sweden and Finland. Greenwood Publishing Group, 2000.
