= The People of Hemsö (1944 film) =

1944 film

- Directed by: Sigurd Wallén
- Written by: Einar Malm; Sigurd Wallén
- Based on: The People of Hemsö by August Strindberg
- Starring: Adolf Jahr; Dagmar Ebbesen; Emil Fjellström
- Cinematography: Harald Berglund
- Edited by: Emil A. Lingheim
- Music by: Erik Baumann
- Production company: Europa Film
- Distributed by: Europa Film
- Release date: 13 March 1944
- Running time: 109 minutes
- Country: Sweden
- Language: Swedish

The People of Hemsö (Swedish: Hemsöborna) is a 1944 Swedish historical drama film directed by Sigurd Wallén and starring Adolf Jahr, Dagmar Ebbesen and Emil Fjellström. It was shot at the Sundbyberg Studios in Stockholm and on location on Vindö. The film's sets were designed by the art director Max Linder. It was based on the 1887 novel The People of Hemsö by August Strindberg. It was subsequently remade as a 1955 film of the same title.

== Cast ==
- Adolf Jahr as Carlsson
- Dagmar Ebbesen as Madam Flod
- Peter Höglund as Gusten
- Sigurd Wallén as Rundqvist
- Emil Fjellström as Nordström
- Nils Hallberg as Norman
- Alice Skoglund as Clara
- Ann-Margret Bergendahl as Lotten
- Elsa Ebbesen as Mrs. Nordström
- Hugo Björne as Professor
- Anna-Greta Krigström as Ida
- Birgit Johannesson as Lina
- Siegfried Fischer as Rapp
- Nils Hultgren as Fiddle Player
- Knut Frankman as Islander
- Gerda Björne as Professor's Wife
- Gun Persson as Professor's Daughter
- Millan Fjellström as Woman at wedding
- Torsten Hillberg as Doctor
- Albert Johansson as Guest at wedding
- Annalisa Wenström as Girl

== Bibliography ==
- Qvist, Per Olov & von Bagh, Peter. Guide to the Cinema of Sweden and Finland. Greenwood Publishing Group, 2000.
