= Sven Thermænius =

Swedish cinematographer

- Born: 30 March 1910; Stockholm, Sweden
- Died: 19 September 1971 (aged 61); Scania, Sweden
- Occupation: Cinematographer
- Years active: 1933-1955 (film)

Sven Thermænius (1910–1971) was a Swedish cinematographer. He was active in Swedish cinema from the 1930s to the 1950s.

== Selected filmography ==
- Two Men and a Widow (1933)
- The Pale Count (1937)
- Sun Over Sweden (1938)
- We at Solglantan (1939)
- Frestelse (1940)
- Hanna in Society (1940)
- Sunny Sunberg (1941)
- Scanian Guerilla (1941)
- Adventurer (1942)
- The Case of Ingegerd Bremssen (1942)
- Life in the Country (1943)
- We Need Each Other (1944)
- Turn of the Century (1944)
- The Happy Tailor (1945)
- Private Karlsson on Leave (1947)
- Dynamite (1947)
- When Love Came to the Village (1950)
- The Saucepan Journey (1950)
- The Clang of the Pick (1952)
- For the Sake of My Intemperate Youth (1952)
- Bread of Love (1953)
- Enchanted Walk (1954)
- The Vicious Breed (1954)

== Bibliography ==
- Warren, Lynne. Encyclopedia of Twentieth-Century Photography. Routledge, 2005.
