= The Key and the Ring =

1947 film

- Directed by: Anders Henrikson
- Written by: August Brunius (play); Bertil Malmberg
- Starring: Anders Henrikson; Aino Taube; Lauritz Falk; Eva Dahlbeck
- Cinematography: Harald Berglund
- Edited by: Emil A. Lingheim
- Music by: Sune Waldimir
- Production company: Europa Film
- Distributed by: Europa Film
- Release date: 29 September 1947
- Running time: 88 minutes
- Country: Sweden
- Language: Swedish

The Key and the Ring (Swedish Nyckeln och ringen) is a 1947 Swedish comedy film directed by and starring Anders Henrikson. The cast also includes Aino Taube, Lauritz Falk and Eva Dahlbeck. The film's sets were designed by the art director Max Linder.

== Cast ==
- Anders Henrikson as John Berner
- Aino Taube as Anna Berner
- Sven-Axel Carlsson as Harald Berner
- Ulf Berggren as Birger Berner
- Lauritz Falk as Ivar Berner
- Hilda Borgström as Grandma
- Eva Dahlbeck as Eva Berg
- Ulla Sallert as Margareta Löving
- Olle Hilding as Falk

== Bibliography ==
- Qvist, Per Olov & von Bagh, Peter. Guide to the Cinema of Sweden and Finland. Greenwood Publishing Group, 2000.
