= Bullan Weijden =

Swedish actress

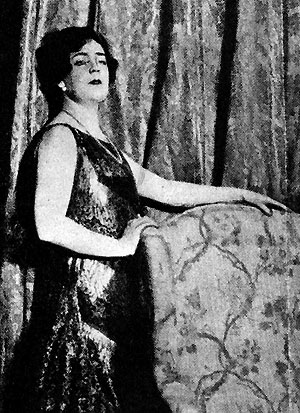
- Weijden in 1926.
- Born: 3 September 1901; Falun, Sweden
- Died: 2 June 1969 (aged 67); Leksand, Sweden
- Other name: Alfhild Weijden-Kraft
- Occupation: Actress
- Years active: 1924–1959 (film)

Bullan Weijden (1901–1969) was a Swedish stage and film actress. She was married to the composer Alvar Kraft.

== Selected filmography ==
- The Song to Her (1934)
- Hotel Paradise (1937)
- Baldwin's Wedding (1938)
- Kalle's Inn (1939)
- A Sailor on Horseback (1940)
- Sunny Sunberg (1941)
- Sun Over Klara (1942)
- Turn of the Century (1944)
- Love Goes Up and Down (1946)
- The Great Amateur (1958)

== Bibliography ==
- Qvist, Per Olov; Von Bagh, Peter (2000). Guide to the Cinema of Sweden and Finland. Greenwood Publishing Group. ISBN 978-0-313-30377-7.
