= A Girl for Me =

1943 film

- Directed by: Börje Larsson
- Written by: Sven Gustafson; Börje Larsson
- Produced by: Olle Brunaeus
- Starring: Sickan Carlsson; Karl-Arne Holmsten; Max Hansen
- Cinematography: Harald Berglund
- Edited by: Wic Kjellin
- Music by: Erik Baumann; Kai Gullmar; Charles Redland
- Production company: Europa Film
- Distributed by: Europa Film
- Release date: 25 August 1943
- Running time: 108 minutes
- Country: Sweden
- Language: Swedish

A Girl for Me (Swedish: En flicka för mej) is a 1943 Swedish comedy film co-written and directed by Börje Larsson and starring Sickan Carlsson, Karl-Arne Holmsten and Max Hansen. It was shot at the Sundbyberg Studios in Stockholm. The film's sets were designed by the art director Max Linder.

== Cast ==
- Sickan Carlsson as Vera Lanner
- Karl-Arne Holmsten as Klas Ekengren
- Max Hansen as Ambrosius Jensen
- Gull Natorp as Lord Mayoress
- Hilda Borgström as Aunt Louise
- Kerstin Lindahl as Marianne
- Eric Gustafson as Hedlund
- Bror Bügler as Halmblad
- Marianne Löfgren as Journalist
- Julia Cæsar as Mrs. Nilsson
- Artur Rolén as Mr. Nilsson
- Willy Peters as Klas' Friend
- Åke Engfeldt as Klas' Friend
- Åke Jensen as Klas' Friend
- Magnus Kesster as Barber
- Ragnar Widestedt as Major Blom
- Carl Deurell as Elder
- Torsten Hillberg as Elder
- Nina Scenna as Therese Hedlund
- Ruth Weijden as Emma
- Stina Ståhle as Mrs. Hedlund
- Wiola Brunius as Gertrud Vesterberg
- Margit Andelius as Mrs. Johansson
- Hartwig Fock as Taxi Driver
- Nils Ohlin as A Man
- Nils Jacobsson (actor) as A Man
- Bertil Berglund as Janitor
- Gösta Bodin as Cafe owner
- Ernst Brunman as Policeman
- Gösta Gustafson as Brinck
- Agneta Lagerfeldt as Woman
- Paul Hagman as Man in the audience
- Arne Lindblad as Maitre d'
- Ingrid Luterkort as Klas' secretary

== Bibliography ==
- Qvist, Per Olov & von Bagh, Peter. Guide to the Cinema of Sweden and Finland. Greenwood Publishing Group, 2000.
