= Tord Bernheim =

Swedish actor

- Born: 18 April 1914; Stockholm, Sweden
- Died: 23 July 1992 (aged 78); Råsunda, Sweden
- Other name: Tord Georg Bernheim
- Occupation: Actor
- Years active: 1933-1950 (film)

Tord Georg Bernheim (born Tord Georg Andersson; 18 April 1914 – 23 July 1992), originally Andersson, was a Swedish singer, actor, and revue performer. He was born on 18 April 1914 in Kungsholms parish in Stockholm. He died on 23 July 1992 in Råsunda, Solna.

Tord Bernheim was the son of Georg Anshelm Andersson and his wife Hilma Signhild Elvira, née Bernheim. He debuted as a revue performer at Mosebacke in 1929 and was then active at various outdoor theaters in Stockholm. He was engaged by Folkan's theater director Ragnar Klange. Bernheim was considered a skilled imitator and worked in 20 different films. He imitated Karl Gerhard, among others.

Bernheim was married to the Norwegian singer Jeanita Melin (1911-1973) before marrying Mary Viktoria Lindström (1924-1979) in 1946. Mary was the daughter of Hjalmar Zephyrinus Lindström, a mechanic, and Syster Viktoria, née Boding.

He is buried at Norra begravningsplatsen in Stockholm.

== Selected filmography ==
- Dear Relatives (1933)
- The Song to Her (1934)
- The Boys of Number Fifty Seven (1935)
- Under False Flag (1935)
- Comrades in Uniform (1938)
- Kalle's Inn (1939)
- Mot nya tider (1939)
- A Crime (1940)
- Heroes in Yellow and Blue (1940)
- Sunny Sunberg (1941)
- Sun Over Klara (1942)
- Livet måste levas (1943)
- His Majesty Must Wait (1945)
- Meeting in the Night (1946)
- Kvarterets olycksfågel (1947)
- Lars Hård (1948)

== Bibliography ==
- Qvist, Per Olov & von Bagh, Peter. Guide to the Cinema of Sweden and Finland. Greenwood Publishing Group, 2000.
