= Skipper Jansson =

1944 film

- Directed by: Sigurd Wallén
- Written by: Sven Gustafson; Sigurd Wallén
- Based on: Skipper Jansson by Sigurd Wallén
- Starring: Sigurd Wallén; Douglas Håge; Artur Rolén; Dagmar Ebbesen
- Cinematography: Harald Berglund
- Edited by: Lennart Wallén
- Music by: Erik Baumann; Nathan Görling
- Production company: Europa Film
- Distributed by: Europa Film
- Release date: 26 December 1944
- Running time: 90 minutes
- Country: Sweden
- Language: Swedish

Skipper Jansson (Swedish: Skeppar Jansson) is a 1944 Swedish comedy film directed by and starring Sigurd Wallén and also featuring Douglas Håge, Artur Rolén and Dagmar Ebbesen. It was shot at the Sundbyberg Studios in Stockholm. The film's sets were designed by the art director Max Linder.

== Synopsis ==
Jansson returns home after many years sailing the world. His two groups of relatives both want him to stay with them in hopes that he will leave them a large share of his inheritance.

== Cast ==
- Sigurd Wallén as Jansson
- Douglas Håge as Nicklas
- Artur Rolén as August Sjöblom
- Dagmar Ebbesen as Mrs. Sjöblom
- Olof Bergström as Rune Sjöblom
- Arthur Fischer as Ernfrid Westerlund
- Gull Natorp as Mrs. Westerlund
- Margareta Fahlén as Maj Westerlund
- Gunnel Broström as Lilly
- Åke Uppström as Bengt
- Alice Skoglund as Aina
- Börje Mellvig as Vicar
- Tord Stål as Manager

== Bibliography ==
- Qvist, Per Olov & von Bagh, Peter. Guide to the Cinema of Sweden and Finland. Greenwood Publishing Group, 2000.
