= Harald Berglund =

Swedish cinematographer

- Born: 31 March 1904; Stockholm, Sweden
- Died: 23 November 1980 (aged 76); Skärholmen, Sweden
- Occupation: Cinematographer
- Years active: 1934-1949 (film)

Harald Berglund (1904–1980) was a Swedish cinematographer.

== Selected filmography ==
- The Women Around Larsson (1934)
- Close Relations (1935)
- Our Boy (1936)
- The Quartet That Split Up (1936)
- South of the Highway (1936)
- For Better, for Worse (1938)
- We at Solglantan (1939)
- Blossom Time (1940)
- A Sailor on Horseback (1940)
- Her Melody (1940)
- Sunny Sunberg (1941)
- How to Tame a Real Man (1941)
- Lucky Young Lady (1941)
- Lasse-Maja (1941)
- The Case of Ingegerd Bremssen (1942)
- Sun Over Klara (1942)
- A Girl for Me (1943)
- Skipper Jansson (1944)
- Blizzard (1944)
- The Green Lift (1944)
- The People of Hemsö (1944)
- Tired Theodore (1945)
- Brita in the Merchant's House (1946)
- The Key and the Ring (1947)
- The Loveliest Thing on Earth (1947)
- Each Heart Has Its Own Story (1948)

== Bibliography ==
- Peter Cowie. Swedish Cinema. Zwemmer, 1966.
