= Wic Kjellin =

Swedish film editor

- Born: 8 April 1914; Stockholm, Sweden
- Died: 9 March 1987 (aged 72); Sundbyberg, Sweden
- Other name: Anna Viktoria Zetterström
- Occupation: Editor
- Years active: 1936-1980 (film)

Wic Kjellin (8 April 1914 – 9 March 1987) was a Swedish film editor. She edited more than a hundred films during her career.

Kjellin was employed at Europafilm where she worked for 30 years. At first she worked as an editing assistant, but as a 22-year-old she had to edit her first feature film, Our Boy. She went on to make six films with Göran Gentele and Vilgot Sjöman respectively, four for Jörn Donner and Jan Halldoff and two for Tage Danielsson and Mai Zetterling. She became a very important person in the film industry during the 1960s and 1970s, partly as a result of her work with Bo Widerbergs Barnvagnen (1963) and Kvarteret Korpen the same year.

Kjellin made a total of about a hundred films between 1936 and 1980. For her efforts, she received the Ingmar Bergman Prize in 1978. She is buried in the memorial grove at Sundbyberg's cemetery.

== Selected filmography ==
- Our Boy (1936)
- The Quartet That Split Up (1936)
- The People of Bergslagen (1937)
- Bashful Anton (1940)
- Hanna in Society (1940)
- Her Melody (1940)
- Sunny Sunberg (1941)
- Lucky Young Lady (1941)
- Sun Over Klara (1942)
- A Girl for Me (1943)
- The Green Lift (1944)
- Widower Jarl (1945)
- Wedding Night (1947)
- Each Heart Has Its Own Story (1948)
- Sven Tusan (1949)
- Pimpernel Svensson (1950)
- Restaurant Intim (1950)
- Count Svensson (1951)
- Living on 'Hope' (1951)
- The Girl from Backafall (1953)
- Marianne (1953)
- A Night at Glimmingehus (1954)
- Simon the Sinner (1954)
- Time of Desire (1954)
- Blue Sky (1955)
- Getting Married (1955)
- When the Mills are Running (1956)
- My Passionate Longing (1956)
- A Doll's House (1956)
- Heart's Desire (1960)
- Lovely Is the Summer Night (1961)
- Ticket to Paradise (1962)
- The Apple War (1971)

== Bibliography ==
- Qvist, Per Olov & von Bagh, Peter. Guide to the Cinema of Sweden and Finland. Greenwood Publishing Group, 2000.
