= Kvarterets olycksfågel =

1947 film

- Directed by: Per G. Holmgren
- Starring: Wiktor Andersson
- Release date: 26 December 1947
- Running time: 90 minutes
- Country: Sweden
- Language: Swedish

Kvarterets olycksfågel is a 1947 Swedish drama film directed by Per G. Holmgren.

== Cast ==
- Wiktor Andersson as Olsson
- Lillemor Appelgren as Britt
- Per-Axel Arosenius as Constable
- Tord Bernheim as Kalle's stepfather
- Astrid Bodin as Berra's mother
- Artur Cederborgh as Man who needs his shoes shined
- David Erikson as Axel Pettersson
- Arthur Fischer as Teacher
- Barbro Flodquist as Kalle's mother
- Erik Forslund as Pettersson's helper
- Sven-Eric Gamble as Hasse Ström
