= Blue Sky (1955 film) =

1955 film

- Directed by: Georg Årlin
- Written by: Åke Ohlmarks; Henry Richter
- Starring: Edvard Persson; Ingeborg Nyberg; Barbro Larsson
- Cinematography: Ingvar Borild
- Edited by: Wic Kjellin
- Music by: Harry Arnold
- Release date: 26 December 1955
- Country: Sweden
- Language: Swedish

Blue Sky (Swedish: Blå himmel) is a 1955 Swedish Eastmancolor comedy film directed by Georg Årlin and starring Edvard Persson, Ingeborg Nyberg and Barbro Larsson.

Blue Sky is Georg Årlin's only film as a director.

== Cast ==
- Edvard Persson as Fridolf Rundquist
- Ingeborg Nyberg as Britt Kellerman
- Barbro Larsson as Majlis Kellerman
- Mim Persson as Mrs. Kellerman
- Kerstin Albihn as Elsa
- Jana Alexandersson as Student at Lundberg's class
- Kristina Andersson as Lilian
- Lisa Andersson as Student at Lundberg's class
- Kenneth Bergström as Figge
- Astrid Bodin as Fru Andersson
- Erling Borgshammar as Yngve
- Anders Frithiof as J.P. Alinder
- Fred Gerle as Peter
- Per Hjern as Galoschan, kristendomslärare
- Ragnar Klange as Teodor Wåhlin, principal
- Algot Larsson as Jönsson, skolvaktmästare
- Bengt Larsson as Fridolf
- Lena Larsson as Inga
- Eva Lidberg as Annika
- Hans-Åke Lindelöw as Student at Lundberg's class
- Gerard Lindqvist as Lasse Janstad
- Kent Malmström as Student at Lundberg's class
- Börje Mellvig as Kommissarien
- Lars-Göran Månsson as Student at Lundberg's class
- Arne Mårtensson as 'Dauber' - teacher of drawing
- Monica Nielsen as Miss Wåhlin
- Rune Olson as Student at Lundberg's class
- Toivo Pawlo as Hamlet, språklärare
- Barbro Persson as Lotte
- Eva Rydberg as Berit
- Lillemor Segerholm as Louise
- Björn Sjödin as Student at Lundberg's class
- Stina Ståhle as Mrs. Wåhlin
- Rune Turesson as Pinne - Gymnastiklärare
- Georg Årlin as Lundberg
- Michael Segerström as Elev

== Bibliography ==
- Qvist, Per Olov & von Bagh, Peter. Guide to the Cinema of Sweden and Finland. Greenwood Publishing Group, 2000.
