= Max Linder (art director) =

Swedish art director

- Born: 21 July 1901; Malmö, Sweden
- Died: 18 July 1948 (aged 46); Bromma, Sweden
- Occupation: Art director
- Years active: 1934–1947 (film)

Max Linder (1901–1948) was a Swedish art director. He designed the film sets on more than fifty productions while working in the Swedish film industry.

== Selected filmography ==
- South of the Highway (1936)
- The Girls of Uppakra (1936)
- The Quartet That Split Up (1936)
- Sun Over Sweden (1938)
- Storm Over the Skerries (1938)
- For Better, for Worse (1938)
- We at Solglantan (1939)
- Kalle's Inn (1939)
- Bashful Anton (1940)
- A Sailor on Horseback (1940)
- Blossom Time (1940)
- Hanna in Society (1940)
- Sunny Sunberg (1941)
- Her Melody (1940)
- Lucky Young Lady (1941)
- How to Tame a Real Man (1941)
- Sun Over Klara (1942)
- The Case of Ingegerd Bremssen (1942)
- Adventurer (1942)
- Life in the Country (1943)
- Elvira Madigan (1943)
- A Girl for Me (1943)
- Blizzard (1944)
- The Green Lift (1944)
- Turn of the Century (1944)
- The People of Hemsö (1944)
- Skipper Jansson (1944)
- Tired Theodore (1945)
- The Happy Tailor (1945)
- Widower Jarl (1945)
- The Bells of the Old Town (1946)
- Brita in the Merchant's House (1946)
- The Key and the Ring (1947)
- The Loveliest Thing on Earth (1947)
- Wedding Night (1947)

== Bibliography ==
- Kwiatkowski, Aleksander. Swedish Film Classics: A Pictorial Survey of 25 Films from 1913 to 1957. Courier Dover Publications, 1983.
