= Blossom Time (1940 film) =

1940 film

- Film poster
- Directed by: Alf Sjöberg
- Written by: Theodor Berthels; Alf Sjöberg
- Produced by: Elling Nordin
- Starring: Sture Lagerwall; Gerd Hagman; Arnold Sjöstrand
- Cinematography: Harald Berglund
- Music by: Björn Schildknecht
- Production company: Artistfilm
- Release date: 28 October 1940
- Running time: 100 minutes
- Country: Sweden
- Language: Swedish

Blossom Time (Swedish: Den blomstertid) is a 1940 Swedish drama film directed by Alf Sjöberg and starring Sture Lagerwall, Gerd Hagman and Arnold Sjöstrand. It was shot at the Sundbyberg Studios of Europafilm in Stockholm with location shooting on Ornö. The film's sets were designed by the art director Max Linder.

== Cast ==
- Sture Lagerwall as Allan Olsson
- Gerd Hagman as Eva Andersson, teacher
- Arnold Sjöstrand as Fritjof Söderberg, sailor and liquor smuggler
- Ragnar Falck as Plutten
- Carl Barcklind as Lövström, chairman of the school council
- Holger Löwenadler as Lundgren
- Hedvig Lindby as Fritjof's mother
- Hilding Gavle as priest
- Ernst Brunman as shopkeeper
- Barbro Flodquist as girl in the workers' barracks
- Valborg Svensson as Ida

== Bibliography ==
- Qvist, Per Olov & von Bagh, Peter. Guide to the Cinema of Sweden and Finland. Greenwood Publishing Group, 2000.
- Wakeman, John. World Film Directors: 1890-1945. H.W. Wilson, 1987.
