= Ingeborg Nyberg =

Swedish actress

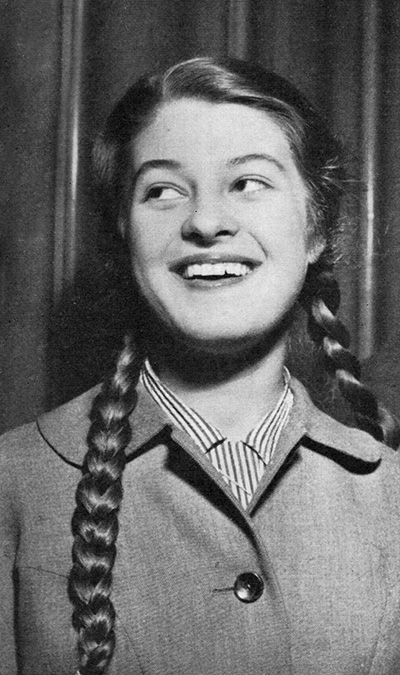
Ingeborg Nyberg in 1958

Ingeborg Elisabeth Nyberg Roos (née Nyberg; born 13 October 1940) is a Swedish singer and actress.

Nyberg was born in Sundsvall. She was discovered at twelve years of age in the radio show Skansenkväll and made her album debut the same year with the music album Sommarnatt. Though her music was mostly Christian music she became a teen idol during her fame years in the 1950s. She recorded 10 single and EP records. Her most notable song is Aftonklockor, released in 1956. Ingeborg Nyberg acted in several film, among them the film Sjutton år (1957). In it she acted with actor Tage Severin.

Nyberg was married to Bengt Åslund between 1965 and 1976, and in 1989 she married Leif Roos. After 1986 she lived in Myresjö in Jönköping.

== Selected filmography ==
- A Night at Glimmingehus (1954)
- Blue Sky (1955)
- When the Mills are Running (1956)
- Seventeen Years Old (1957)
