= Bashful Anton =

1940 film

- Directed by: Emil A. Lingheim
- Written by: Theodor Berthels; Henry Richter
- Starring: Edvard Persson; Ingrid Luterkort; Britta Brunius
- Cinematography: Olle Ekman
- Edited by: Wic Kjellin
- Music by: Alvar Kraft
- Production company: Europa Film
- Release date: 6 May 1940
- Country: Sweden
- Language: Swedish

Bashful Anton (Swedish: Blyge Anton) is a 1940 Swedish comedy film directed by Emil A. Lingheim and starring Edvard Persson, Ingrid Luterkort and Britta Brunius.

The film's art direction was by Max Linder.

== Cast ==
- Edvard Persson as Karl Anton Malm
- Ingrid Luterkort as Mildred Andersson
- Britta Brunius as Kätie Melin
- Karl-Arne Holmsten as Arne Boman
- Fritiof Billquist as Director Stengård
- Torsten Winge as Baron Gyllenflycht
- Eric Malmberg as Director Kjellberg
- Elvin Ottoson as Werner
- Axel Lindberg as Ekberg
- Arthur Fischer as Ågren
- Elly Christiansson as Dolly
- Eric Dahlström as Gårdman
- Frithiof Hedvall as Albrechtsson
- Astrid Lindgren as Stina
- Aurore Palmgren as Beata
- Sussi Adolfi as Little Girl
- Björn Berglund as Speaker at Rifle Foundation Meeting
- Astrid Bodin as Lady at the Bus
- Helga Brofeldt as Angry Woman in Window
- Nils Ekstam as Member of the Board
- Ragnar Falck as Sniper
- Gösta Grip as Secretary
- Jullan Jonsson as Cook
- Sten Sture Modéen as Employee at Office
- Karen Rasmussen as Employee at the Office
- Edla Rothgardt as Old Cleaning Lady
- Inger Sundberg as Young Girl
- Kate Thunman as Cleaning Lady
- Hugo Tranberg as Waiter
- Gunnel Wadner as Balet Girl
- Susanna Östberg as Karin

== Bibliography ==
- Qvist, Per Olov & von Bagh, Peter. Guide to the Cinema of Sweden and Finland. Greenwood Publishing Group, 2000.
