= The Song to Her =

1934 film

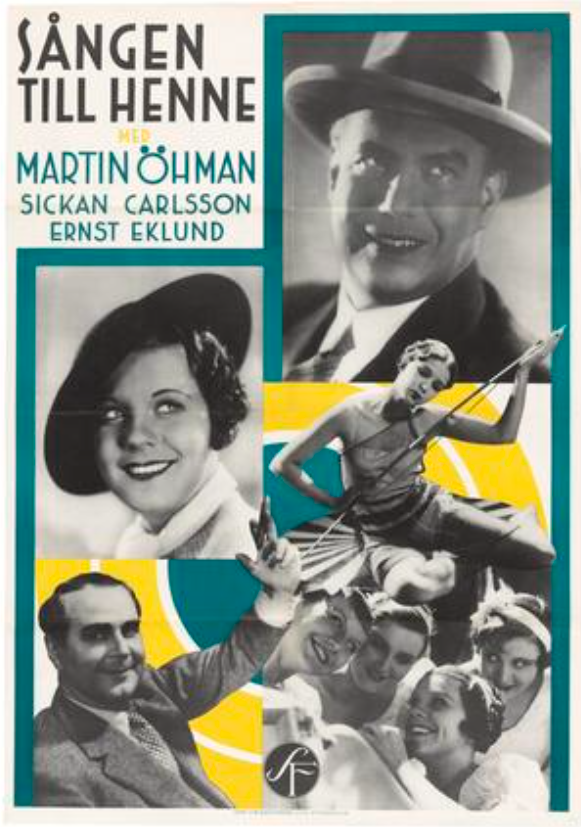
- Directed by: Ivar Johansson
- Written by: Sölve Cederstrand; Ivar Johansson
- Produced by: Stellan Claësson
- Starring: Martin Öhman; Sickan Carlsson; Greta Gynt
- Cinematography: Martin Bodin
- Edited by: Rolf Husberg
- Music by: Jules Sylvain
- Production company: Svensk Filmindustri
- Distributed by: Svensk Filmindustri
- Release date: 8 October 1934
- Running time: 83 minutes
- Country: Sweden
- Language: Swedish

The Song to Her (Swedish: Sången till henne) is a 1934 Swedish comedy film directed by Ivar Johansson and starring Martin Öhman, Sickan Carlsson and Åke Jensen. It marked the film debut of Kristina Söderbaum, who went on to be a star of German cinema in the Nazi era. It was also the first screen appearance of Norwegian actress Greta Gynt who went on to star in British films. The film was made at the Råsunda Studios in Stockholm and on location around the city including at the Royal Swedish Opera. The film's sets were designed by the art director Arne Åkermark.

== Synopsis ==
A famous opera singer arrives for a special performance with the Stockholm ballet, leading to several ballerinas swooning over him. He takes a fancy to one of them, Märta Holm, and she is torn between him and her fiancée Arne.

== Cast ==
- Martin Öhman as Carlo Martin
- Sickan Carlsson as Märta Holm
- Åke Jensen as Arne Wingård
- Greta Gynt as Kaj Klint
- Ernst Eklund as Harry Händel
- Eric Abrahamsson as Wig maker
- Nils Wahlbom as Piano tuner
- Nini Theilade as Dancer at Rondo
- Charles Redland as Musician at Rondo
- Kristina Söderbaum as Guest at Rondo
- Tord Bernheim as Dancer at Rondo
- Hugo Björne as Opera manager
- Astrid Bodin as Cleaning-lady listening to Carlo Martin
- Allan Bohlin as Arne's friend
- Sonja Claesson as Märta's mother
- Georg Fernqvist as Photographer at the railway station
- Hjördis Petterson as Woman waiting outside The Opera
- Lizzy Stein as Liva Landberg
- Ilse-Nore Tromm as Dancer at Grand
- Bullan Weijden as Cleaning-lady
- Carl-Gunnar Wingård as Drunk gentleman at Rondo

== Bibliography ==
- Qvist, Per Olov & von Bagh, Peter. Guide to the Cinema of Sweden and Finland. Greenwood Publishing Group, 2000.
