= Girl from the Mountain Village =

1948 film

- Directed by: Anders Henrikson
- Written by: Sven Gustafson
- Based on: Undan frostpiskan by Bernhard Nordh
- Starring: Bengt Blomgren; Eva Dahlbeck; Carl Deurell
- Cinematography: Bertil Palmgren
- Edited by: Emil A. Lingheim
- Music by: Sven Sköld
- Production company: Europa Film
- Distributed by: Europa Film
- Release date: 29 November 1948
- Running time: 96 minutes
- Country: Sweden
- Language: Swedish

Girl from the Mountain Village (Swedish: Flickan från fjällbyn) is a 1948 Swedish drama film directed by Anders Henrikson and starring Bengt Blomgren, Eva Dahlbeck and Carl Deurell. It was shot at the Sundbyberg Studios of Europa Film in Stockholm and on location in Härjedalen and Northern Norway.

== Synopsis ==
At the beginning of the twentieth century the inhabitants of a Norrland village are compelled by crop failures to emigrate, and become part of the large Swedish movement to the United States.

== Cast ==
- Bengt Blomgren as Erik
- Eva Dahlbeck as Isa
- Einar Hylander as Manuel
- Carl Deurell as Gammel-Jerk
- Kaj Nohrborg as Gustav
- Sif Ruud as Erika
- Else-Marie Brandt as Ellen

== Bibliography ==
- Wallengren, Ann-Kristin. Welcome Home Mr Swanson: Swedish Emigrants and Swedishness on Film. Nordic Academic Press, 2014.
