= Jens Mansson in America =

- Directed by: Bengt Janzon
- Written by: Bengt Janzon; Carl-Adam Nycop
- Produced by: Otto Scheutz
- Starring: Edvard Persson; Stig Olin; Mim Persson
- Cinematography: Bertil Palmgren; Mack Stengler
- Edited by: Gösta Bjurman
- Music by: Alvar Kraft
- Production company: Europa Film
- Release date: 24 March 1947
- Running time: 101 minutes
- Country: Sweden
- Language: Swedish

Jens Mansson in America (Swedish: Jens Månsson i Amerika) is a 1947 Swedish comedy film directed by Bengt Janzon and starring Edvard Persson, Stig Olin and Mim Persson.

== Cast ==
- Edvard Persson as Jens Månsson
- Stig Olin as Johnny Andersson
- Mim Persson as Mim
- Bojan Westin as Marie-Louise
- Sven Arvor as Lawyer
- Bertil Berglund as County constable
- Edvard Danielsson as Bank clerk
- Berns De Reaux as Shoeshiner
- Cecil B. DeMille as himself
- Erik Frank as Accordion player
- Hortensia Hedström as Dorothy Smith
- Kerstin Holmberg as Bank clerk
- Björn Holmström as Detective
- Einar Hylander as Consulate secretary in New York
- Vincent Jonasson as Steward on Drottningholm
- Eddy Justin as Servant
- Virginia Kroog as Mary, Axel's housewife
- Peder Lilliecreutz as General counselor
- Ivar Lindahl as Swedish-American giving a ride
- Valborg Ljungberg as Mrs. Nilsson - Jens' housemaid
- Lorry Lorentzen as Custom official
- Gösta Lycke as Parish constable
- Verner Oakland as Harris
- Otto Scheutz as Trucker giving Jens a ride
- Per Sjöstrand as Policeman
- Erik Söderman as Hand
- Ernst Wellton as Policeman
- Otto Wellton as Axel
- Anna Westling-Leman as Stewardess
- Carl-Johan Åbom as Consul in San Francisco

== Bibliography ==
- Qvist, Per Olov & von Bagh, Peter. Guide to the Cinema of Sweden and Finland. Greenwood Publishing Group, 2000.
