= Åke Jensen =

Swedish actor

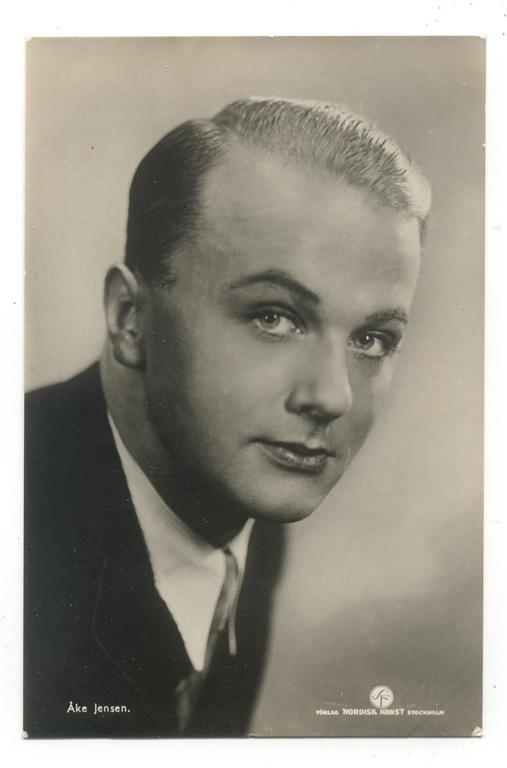
- Jensen (c.1940)
- Born: 14 November 1912; Karlstad, Sweden
- Died: 2 November 1993 (aged 80); Stockholm, Sweden
- Occupation: Actor
- Years active: 1933–1952 (film)

Åke Jensen (1912–1993) was a Swedish stage and film actor and singer. He appeared in a number of operettas and revues.

== Selected filmography ==
- Dear Relatives (1933)
- Pettersson - Sverige (1934)
- The Song to Her (1934)
- Odygdens belöning (1937)
- How to Tame a Real Man (1941)
- A Girl for Me (1943)
- Kärlek och allsång (1944)
- The Old Clock at Ronneberga (1944)
- The Bells of the Old Town (1946)
- Poor Little Sven (1947)
- Private Bom (1948)
- Divorced (1951)
- Blondie, Beef and the Banana (1952)

== Bibliography ==
- Jean-Louis Ginibre, John Lithgow & Barbara Cady. Ladies Or Gentlemen: A Pictorial History of Male Cross-dressing in the Movies. Filipacchi Publishing, 2005.
- Steene, Birgitta. Ingmar Bergman: A Reference Guide. Amsterdam University Press, 2005.
