= Scanian Guerilla =

1941 film

- Directed by: Åke Ohberg
- Starring: Edvard Persson
- Cinematography: Sven Thermænius
- Release date: 26 December 1941
- Running time: 113 minutes
- Country: Sweden
- Language: Swedish

Scanian Guerilla (Swedish: Snapphanar) is a 1941 Swedish historical drama film directed by Åke Ohberg.

== Cast ==
- Edvard Persson as Grimme Jens
- Tekla Sjöblom as Cilla
- George Fant as Ored Jensen
- Oscar Ljung as Per Jensen
- Åke Ohberg as Nils Jensen
- Carl Ström as Helsing
- Eva Henning as Kerstin
- Sven Bergvall as Swedish colonel
- Bror Bügler as Lt. Cronhjort
- Gunnar Sjöberg as Långe-Tuve
- Yngve Nordwall as Sören
