= The Red Horses (1954 film) =

1954 film

- Directed by: Ivar Johansson
- Written by: Gösta Stevens
- Based on: The Red Horses by Morten Korch
- Produced by: Gösta Sandin
- Starring: Gun Arvidsson; Jan-Erik Lindqvist; Rut Holm
- Cinematography: Sten Aaröe
- Edited by: Bengt Eriksson
- Production company: Svensk Talfilm
- Distributed by: Svensk Talfilm
- Release date: 18 October 1954
- Running time: 100 minutes
- Country: Sweden
- Language: Swedish

The Red Horses (Swedish: De röda hästarna) is a 1954 Swedish sports drama film directed by Ivar Johansson and starring Gun Arvidsson, Jan-Erik Lindqvist and Rut Holm. It is a remake of the 1950 Danish film The Red Horses, itself based on a 1943 novel by Morten Korch. It was shot at Svensk Talfilm's studios in Malmö and Täby. Location shooting took place around Malmö including Jägersro, Solvalla and Hörby.

== Cast ==
- Gun Arvidsson as Margit Törner
- Jan-Erik Lindqvist as Bertil Hagert
- Rut Holm as Louise
- Artur Rolén as Ludde Mårtenson
- Harry Persson as Olle Olsson
- Inger Juel as Ulla Cronstam
- Hugo Björne as Hjalmar Hagert
- Gösta Cederlund as Harald Friberg
- Ebba Ringdahl as Ester Törner
- Allan Bohlin as Willner
- Nils Fritz as Ester's Lawyer
- John Precht as Helge Törner
- Nils Johannisson as Doctor
- Margaretha Löwler as Gunnel Hagert
- Helen Jonson as Greta Friberg
- Anders Hellquist as Priest at Wedding

== See also ==
- List of films about horses
- List of films about horse racing

== Bibliography ==
- Qvist, Per Olov & von Bagh, Peter. Guide to the Cinema of Sweden and Finland. Greenwood Publishing Group, 2000.
