= Barbro Flodquist =

Swedish actress

- Born: 19 April 1919; Stockholm, Sweden
- Died: 29 January 1971 (aged 51); Stockholm, Sweden
- Occupation: Actor
- Years active: 1940–1955

Barbro Larsdotter Flodquist (19 April 1919 – 29 January 1971) was a Swedish film actress. She appeared in 17 films between 1940 and 1955.

== Selected filmography ==
- Hanna in Society (1940)
- Blossom Time (1940)
- Sun Over Klara (1942)
- Little Napoleon (1943)
- Kungsgatan (1943)
- Kvarterets olycksfågel (1947)
- Neglected by His Wife (1947)
- The Night Watchman's Wife (1947)
- Music in Darkness (1948)
- The Street (1949)
- Restaurant Intim (1950)
- Darling of Mine (1955)
