= Sunny Sunberg =

1941 film

- Directed by: Emil A. Lingheim
- Written by: Harry Iseborg; Guido Valentin
- Starring: Edvard Persson; Märta Arbin; Anna-Greta Krigström
- Cinematography: Harald Berglund; Sven Thermænius
- Edited by: Wic Kjellin
- Music by: Alvar Kraft
- Production company: Europa Film
- Release date: 7 August 1941
- Running time: 88 minutes
- Country: Sweden
- Language: Swedish

Sunny Sunberg (Swedish:Soliga Solberg) is a 1941 Swedish comedy film directed by Emil A. Lingheim and starring Edvard Persson, Märta Arbin and Anna-Greta Krigström.

The film's art direction was by Max Linder.

== Main cast ==
- Edvard Persson as Gunnar Solberg
- Märta Arbin as Mrs. Solberg
- Anna-Greta Krigström as Lotten Solberg
- Göran Bernhard as Per Solberg
- Tord Andersén as Kalle Andersson
- Tord Bernheim as Frasse Olsson
- Hugo Björne as Carlesson
- Gerda Björne as Mrs. Carlesson
- Nils Nordståhl as Jan Carlesson
- Inger Sundberg as Lisa Carlesson
- Bullan Weijden as Opera Singer
- Holger Sjöberg as Opera singer
- Carin Swensson as Maid
- Astrid Bodin as Housemaid
- Erik Rosén as Child care officer
- Arne Lindblad as Salesman
- Sten Meurk as Waiter

== Bibliography ==
- Qvist, Per Olov & von Bagh, Peter. Guide to the Cinema of Sweden and Finland. Greenwood Publishing Group, 2000.
