= Marianne Gyllenhammar =

Swedish actress

- Born: 3 January 1924; Ed, Västernorrland County, Sweden
- Died: 16 February 2013 (aged 89); Benidorm, Alicante, Spain
- Occupation: Actress
- Years active: 1941–1953 (film)

Marianne Gyllenhammar (1924–2013) was a Swedish film and stage actress. She was married to the actor Rolf Botvid.

== Selected filmography ==
- Tonight or Never (1941)
- There's a Fire Burning (1943)
- Young Blood (1943)
- I Killed (1943)
- Som du vill ha mej (1943)
- The Green Lift (1944)
- Stopp! Tänk på något annat (1944)
- Turn of the Century (1944)
- The Happy Tailor (1945)
- The Balloon (1946)
- How to Love (1947)
- Song of Stockholm (1947)
- Poor Little Sven (1947)
- Music in Darkness (1948)
- Loffe as a Millionaire (1948)
- My Sister and I (1950)
- Stupid Bom (1953)

== Bibliography ==
- Paietta, Ann C. Teachers in the Movies: A Filmography of Depictions of Grade School, Preschool and Day Care Educators, 1890s to the Present. McFarland, 2007.
- Steene, Birgitta. Ingmar Bergman: A Reference Guide. Amsterdam University Press, 2005.
