= Emil A. Lingheim =

Swedish film director and editor (1898–1984)

- Born: 31 May 1898; Sweden
- Died: 21 March 1984 (aged 85); Sweden
- Other name: Emil A. Pehrsson
- Occupations: Director, Editor
- Years active: 1932-1966 (film)

Emil A. Lingheim (1898–1984) was a Swedish film director and editor.

== Selected filmography ==
- Secret Svensson (1933)
- Saturday Nights (1933)
- The Women Around Larsson (1934)
- Close Relations (1935)
- South of the Highway (1936)
- Raggen (1936)
- Baldwin's Wedding (1938)
- For Better, for Worse (1938)
- Sun Over Sweden (1938)
- Storm Over the Skerries (1938)
- Kalle's Inn (1939)
- Bashful Anton (1940)
- A Sailor on Horseback (1940)
- Sunny Sunberg (1941)
- Lasse-Maja (1941)
- Sun Over Klara (1942)
- The People of Hemsö (1944)
- Blizzard (1944)
- The Happy Tailor (1945)
- Tired Theodore (1945)
- The Key and the Ring (1947)
- The Loveliest Thing on Earth (1947)
- Girl from the Mountain Village (1948)
- Pimpernel Svensson (1950)
- Count Svensson (1951)
- A Difficult Parish (1958)

== Bibliography ==
- Mariah Larsson & Anders Marklund. Swedish Film: An Introduction and Reader. Nordic Academic Press, 2010.
