= Stina Ståhle =

Swedish actress

- Born: 7 September 1907; Stockholm, Sweden
- Died: 10 January 1971 (aged 63); Norrköping, Sweden
- Occupation: Actress
- Years active: 1929-1962

Stina Ståhle (7 September 1907 – 10 January 1971) was a Swedish actress. She appeared in more than 30 films between 1929 and 1962.

== Selected filmography ==
- Say It with Music (1929)
- The Atlantic Adventure (1934)
- Adolf Strongarm (1937)
- Mot nya tider (1939)
- Dunungen (1941)
- Sun Over Klara (1942)
- Imprisoned Women (1943)
- A Girl for Me (1943)
- Kungsgatan (1943)
- Guttersnipes (1944)
- Eaglets (1944)
- I Am Fire and Air (1944)
- Youth in Danger (1946)
- Blue Sky (1955)
- When the Mills are Running (1956)
- The Girl in Tails (1956)
- Synnöve Solbakken (1957)
- A Goat in the Garden (1958)
