= Axel Wallengren =

Swedish writer

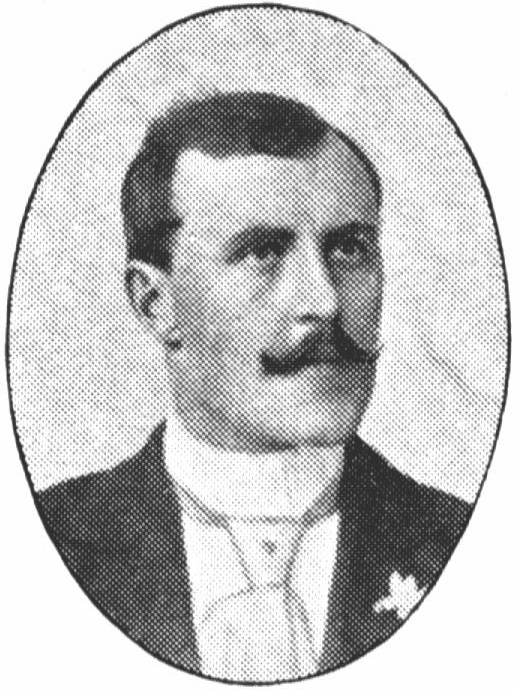
Axel Wallengren in the 1890s.

Sven Axel Olaus Wallengren (originally Svensson) (26 January 1865, Lund – 4 December 1896, Berlin) was a Swedish author, poet, and journalist, who wrote under the pen name Falstaff, fakir.

Wallengren was born in Lund where he would spend most of his short life. His father Mårten Svensson (1831-1898) was the poor son of a peasant who had managed to work his way up to a respectable position as a local civil servant, and his mother Olivia Wallengren (1842-1879) was the daughter of a clergyman. Although the latter died of tuberculosis when young Axel was only fourteen and his many siblings even younger, he seems to have had a fairly harmonious middle-class childhood. After having attended the local gymnasium Katedralskolan, Wallengren enrolled as a student at Lund University in 1883. At first he studied diligently and received a degree as Bachelor of Arts in 1886. After this he entered the faculty of law - probably mainly as a result of his father's ambitions - but from then on his literary and other interests would take the upper hand of him, and he never fulfilled this part of his education.

Wallengren had begun developing his writing skills already as a schoolboy through "Vala", a literary society at his gymnasium. Originally mainly working as a poet he got his first poems published already as a teenager.

== Sources ==
- Hans Küntzel: "Axel Wallengren - en studie" in Axel Wallengrens Samlade skrifter (= Collected works), vol. 1 (Stockholm 1923)
