= Ivar Kåge =

Swedish actor

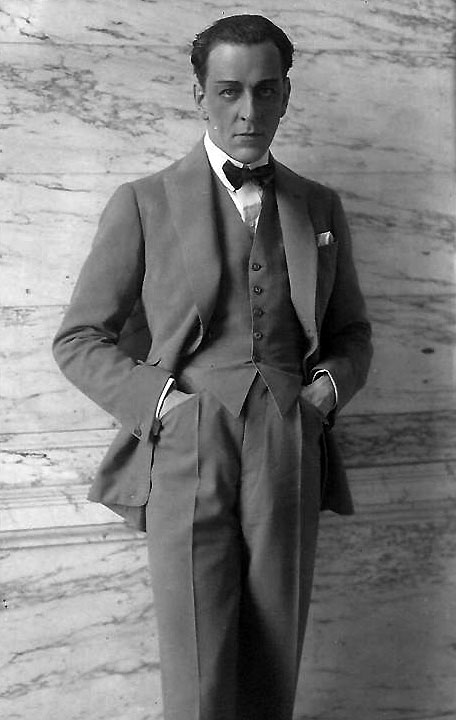
- Born: 21 February 1881; Stockholm, Sweden
- Died: 21 April 1951 (aged 70); Stockholm, Sweden
- Occupation: Actor
- Years active: 1913–1949

Ivar Kåge (21 February 1881 – 21 April 1951) was a Swedish film actor. He appeared in more than 50 films between 1913 and 1949.

== Selected filmography ==
- The Conflicts of Life (1913)
- Where the Lighthouse Flashes (1924)
- The Million Dollars (1926)
- Modern Wives (1932)
- Kanske en gentleman (1935)
- Walpurgis Night (1935)
- The Quartet That Split Up (1936)
- Russian Flu (1937)
- John Ericsson, Victor of Hampton Roads (1937)
- The People of Högbogården (1939)
- We at Solglantan (1939)
- Life Begins Today (1939)
- A Sailor on Horseback (1940)
- Heroes in Yellow and Blue (1940)
- A Crime (1940)
- General von Döbeln (1942)
- Dangerous Ways (1942)
- The Case of Ingegerd Bremssen (1942)
- There's a Fire Burning (1943)
- Bambi (1943)
- Life in the Country (1943)
- The Old Clock at Ronneberga (1944)
- Turn of the Century (1944)
- His Excellency (1944)
- The Happy Tailor (1945)
- Kristin Commands (1946)
- Incorrigible (1946)
- Soldier's Reminder (1947)
- The Girl from the Marsh Croft (1947)
- Life Starts Now (1948)
- On These Shoulders (1948)
- Playing Truant (1949)
- Bohus Battalion (1949)
- Realm of Man (1949)
