= Sun Over Klara =

1942 film

- Directed by: Emil A. Lingheim
- Written by: Erik Lundegård
- Starring: Edvard Persson; Barbro Flodquist; Stina Ståhle
- Cinematography: Harald Berglund
- Edited by: Wic Kjellin
- Music by: Alvar Kraft
- Production company: Europa Film
- Release date: 3 August 1942
- Running time: 103 minutes
- Country: Sweden
- Language: Swedish

Sun Over Klara (Swedish:Sol över Klara) is a 1942 Swedish drama film directed by Emil A. Lingheim and starring Edvard Persson, Barbro Flodquist and Stina Ståhle.

The film's art direction was by Max Linder.

== Main cast ==
- Edvard Persson as Ararat
- Barbro Flodquist as Sylvia
- Stina Ståhle as Elisabeth Söderheim
- Björn Berglund as Axel
- Bror Bügler as Reuben
- Frithiof Hedvall as Tirolius
- Nils Ekstam
- Martin Sterner as man with silvery hair
- Tord Bernheim as Manne
- Anders Julius as himself
- Karl 'Lax-Kalle' Andersson as Lax-Kalle
- Gerd Mårtensson as Sonja
- Viveka Linder as Britta
- Åke Claesson as Carl Michael Bellman
- Bullan Weijden as Hulda
- Arthur Fischer as Porter
- Arne Lindblad as Magician
- Harald Svensson as Colonel Karlsson
- Hartwig Fock as Tax Collector
- Artur Cederborgh as Sergeant
- Carl Deurell as Priest

== Bibliography ==
- Qvist, Per Olov & von Bagh, Peter. Guide to the Cinema of Sweden and Finland. Greenwood Publishing Group, 2000.
