= Karl Erik Flens =

Swedish actor

- Born: 19 March 1913; Lidingö, Sweden
- Died: 17 October 1975 (aged 62); Stockholm, Sweden
- Occupation: Actor
- Years active: 1938–1975

Karl Erik Flens (19 March 1913 – 17 October 1975) was a Swedish film actor. He appeared in 60 films between 1938 and 1975.

== Selected filmography ==
- The Two of Us (1939)
- The Fight Continues (1941)
- How to Tame a Real Man (1941)
- Imprisoned Women (1943)
- In Darkest Smaland (1943)
- Gentleman with a Briefcase (1943)
- Turn of the Century (1944)
- Johansson and Vestman (1946)
- Crisis (1946)
- Don't Give Up (1947)
- Private Bom (1948)
- Blondie, Beef and the Banana (1952)
- The Chieftain of Göinge (1953)
- Taxi 13 (1954)
- Dance in the Smoke (1954)
- Darling of Mine (1955)
- Violence (1955)
- When the Mills are Running (1956)
- A Goat in the Garden (1958)
- The Great Amateur (1958)
- Crime in Paradise (1959)
- Rider in Blue (1959)
- The Judge (1960)
- 4x4 (1965)
- Maria (1975)
