= Dagmar Ebbesen =

Swedish actress (1891–1954)

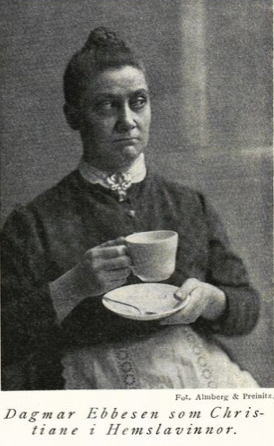
- Ebbesen as Christiane in the play Hemslavinnor
- Born: 1 October 1891; Stockholm, Sweden
- Died: 6 November 1954 (aged 63)
- Occupation: Actress
- Years active: 1913-1954
- Relatives: Elsa Ebbesen (sister)

Dagmar Ebbesen (1 October 1891 – 6 November 1954) was a Swedish film actress. She appeared in 90 films between 1913 and 1954. She was closely associated with the role of Kristina the maid which she played on stage and in three films beginning with House Slaves in 1923.

== Selected filmography ==
- Andersson's Kalle (1922)
- House Slaves (1923)
- New Pranks of Andersson's Kalle (1923)
- The Red Day (1931)
- Skipper's Love (1931)
- Colourful Pages (1931)
- Love and Deficit (1932)
- The Southsiders (1932)
- Secret Svensson (1933)
- Augusta's Little Misstep (1933)
- Saturday Nights (1933)
- House Slaves (1933)
- The Women Around Larsson (1934)
- Close Relations (1935)
- The Girls of Uppakra (1936)
- The Quartet That Split Up (1936)
- Baldwin's Wedding (1938)
- We at Solglantan (1939)
- Life Begins Today (1939)
- Hanna in Society (1940)
- Her Melody (1940)
- A Crime (1940)
- Lucky Young Lady (1941)
- How to Tame a Real Man (1941)
- The Poor Millionaire (1941)
- The Case of Ingegerd Bremssen (1942)
- We House Slaves (1942)
- Life in the Country (1943)
- The People of Hemsö (1944)
- Skipper Jansson (1944)
- Widower Jarl (1945)
- Kristin Commands (1946)
- Each Heart Has Its Own Story (1948)
- Playing Truant (1949)
- Fiancée for Hire (1950)
- The Quartet That Split Up (1950)
- Restaurant Intim (1950)
- Teacher's First Born (1950)
- Jack of Hearts (1950)
- When Love Came to the Village (1950)
- The Clang of the Pick (1952)
- Summer with Monika (1953)
- Hidden in the Fog (1953)
- Ursula, the Girl from the Finnish Forests (1953)
- The Girl from Backafall (1953)
- Stupid Bom (1953)
- Dance, My Doll (1953)
- Young Summer (1954)
- A Lesson in Love (1954)
- Dance on Roses (1954)

== Bibliography ==
- Freiburg, Jeanne Ellen. Regulatory Bodies: Gendered Visions of the State in German and Swedish Cinema. University of Minnesota, 1994.
