= Fritiof Billquist =

Swedish actor (1901–1972)

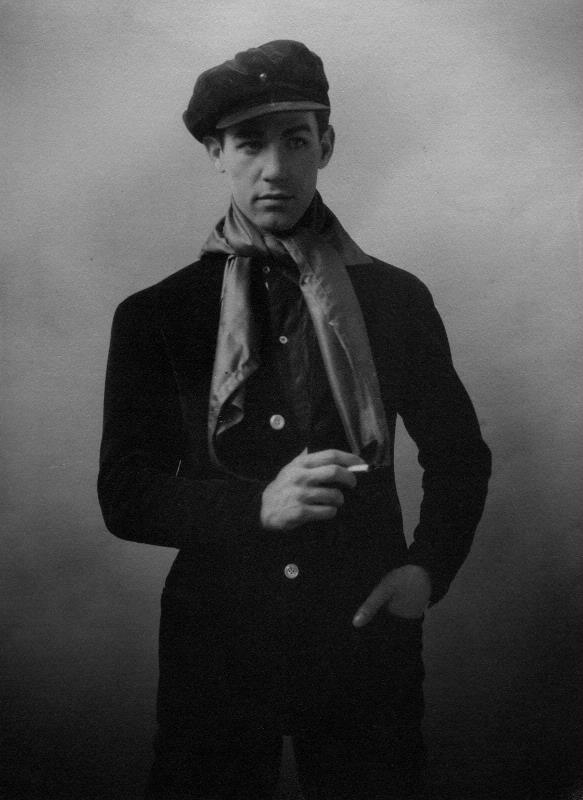
- Billquist in 1926
- Born: Erik Fritiof Billquist; 5 May 1901; Malmö, Sweden
- Died: 21 April 1972 (aged 70); Stockholm, Sweden
- Occupation: Actor
- Years active: 1931–1969
- Spouse: Ulla Billquist (m. 1926–1934)
- Children: Åsa Billquist-Roussel
- Relatives: Carl Billquist (nephew)

Erik Fritiof Billquist (5 May 1901 – 21 April 1972) was a Swedish film actor. He appeared in more than 60 films between 1931 and 1969.

== Selected filmography ==
- Tired Theodore (1931)
- International Match (1932)
- South of the Highway (1936)
- Raggen (1936)
- Comrades in Uniform (1938)
- Circus (1939)
- Bashful Anton (1940)
- Västkustens hjältar (1940)
- In Paradise (1941)
- Men of the Navy (1943)
- Life and Death (1943)
- Turn of the Century (1944)
- The Happy Tailor (1945)
- Jolanta the Elusive Pig (1945)
- Private Karlsson on Leave (1947)
- Främmande hamn (1948)
- Loffe as a Millionaire (1948)
- A Swedish Tiger (1948)
- Bohus Battalion (1949)
- Restaurant Intim (1950)
- Customs Officer Bom (1951)
- Dance, My Doll (1953)
- Hidden in the Fog (1953)
- The Vicious Breed (1954)
- My Passionate Longing (1956)
- The Biscuit (1956)
- More Than a Match for the Navy (1958)
