= Life in the Country (1943 film) =

1943 film

- Directed by: Bror Bügler
- Written by: Bror Bügler; Gabriel Jönsson; Henry Richter
- Based on: From My Farming Days by Fritz Reuter
- Starring: Edvard Persson; George Fant; Birgitta Valberg
- Cinematography: Sven Thermænius
- Edited by: Gösta Bjurman
- Music by: Alvar Kraft
- Production company: Europa Film
- Release date: 29 November 1943
- Running time: 106 minutes
- Country: Sweden
- Language: Swedish

Life in the Country (Swedish: Livet på landet) is a 1943 Swedish historical comedy film directed by Bror Bügler and starring Edvard Persson, George Fant and Birgitta Valberg. It is based on the 1862 German novel From My Farming Days by Fritz Reuter, which had previously been adapted into the 1924 Swedish silent film Life in the Country.

The film's sets were designed by the art director Max Linder.

== Cast ==
- Edvard Persson as Zakarias Bräsig
- George Fant as Frans von Rambow
- Bror Bügler as Axel von Rambow
- Birgitta Valberg as Frida von Rambow
- Ivar Kåge as Carl Haverman
- Ingrid Backlin as Louise Haverman
- Willy Peters as Fritz
- Mim Persson as Marie Möller
- Kolbjörn Knudsen as Carl Brockman
- Dagmar Ebbesen as Mrs. Brockman
- Birgitta Arman as Salla Brockman
- Nancy Dalunde as Malla Brockman
- Sven Bergvall as Reverend Berger
- Gull Natorp as Mrs. Berger
- Albert Ståhl as Brolin
- John Ericsson as Anders
- John Norrman as Night-watchman
- Robert Johnson as Auctioneer
- Georg Fernqvist as Daniel

== Bibliography ==
- Goble, Alan. The Complete Index to Literary Sources in Film. Walter de Gruyter, 1999.
- Qvist, Per Olov & von Bagh, Peter. Guide to the Cinema of Sweden and Finland. Greenwood Publishing Group, 2000.
