= Harry Persson (actor) =

Swedish actor and singer

- Born: 4 August 1906; Malmö, Sweden
- Died: 28 November 1961 (aged 55); Malmö
- Occupations: Actor, singer
- Years active: 1924–1960

Harry Persson (4 August 1906 – 28 November 1961) was a Swedish actor and singer. He appeared in over 15 films.

== Selected filmography ==
- Gamla gatans karneval (1924)
- Farmors revolution (1933)
- The Boys of Number Fifty Seven (1935)
- Skanör-Falsterbo (1939)
- Kalle's Inn (1939)
- Stinsen på Lyckås (1942)
- Skåningar (1944)
- Rännstensungar (1944)
- Jolanta the Elusive Pig (1945)
- Trav, hopp och kärlek (1945)
- Sten Stensson kommer till stan (1945)
- Ebberöds bank (1946)
- The Red Horses (1954)
- A Night at Glimmingehus (1954)
- Time of Desire (1954)
- Kärlek på turné (1955)
