= Jolanta the Elusive Pig =

- Directed by: Hugo Bolander; Oscar Winge
- Written by: Fritiof Billquist; August Hinrichs (play); Henry Richter; Gösta Stevens
- Starring: Oscar Winge; Ninni Löfberg; Thor Modéen
- Cinematography: Julius Jaenzon
- Edited by: Oscar Rosander
- Music by: Gösta Stevens; Sune Waldimir
- Production company: Fribergs Filmbyrå
- Release date: 1945
- Country: Sweden
- Language: Swedish

Jolanta the Elusive Pig (Swedish: Jolanta - den gäckande suggan) is a 1945 Swedish comedy film directed by Hugo Bolander, Oscar Winge and starring Winge, Ninni Löfberg and Thor Modéen.

It is a remake of the 1934 German film Trouble with Jolanthe.

== Cast ==
- Oscar Winge as Jeppsson
- Ninni Löfberg as Karin Jeppsson
- Thor Modéen as Police constable
- Fritiof Billquist as Pilgren
- Torsten Lilliecrona as Folke Lindgren
- Harry Persson as Valdemar Månsson
- Carin Swensson as Hanna Jönsson
- Per Björkman as Svensson
- Algot Larsson as Sören

== Bibliography ==
- Rune Waldekranz. Filmens historia: de första hundra åren från zoopraxiscope till video, Volume 2. Norstedt, 1986.
