= Youth in Danger =

1946 Swedish drama film

- Directed by: Per G. Holmgren
- Written by: Per G. Holmgren
- Starring: Kenne Fant; Gunnar Sjöberg; Sven-Eric Gamble
- Cinematography: Walter Boberg
- Edited by: Lennart Wallén
- Music by: Per-Martin Hamberg
- Production company: Svensk Talfilm
- Distributed by: Svensk Talfilm
- Release date: 11 November 1946
- Running time: 95 minutes
- Country: Sweden
- Language: Swedish

Youth in Danger (Swedish: Ungdom i fara) is a 1946 Swedish drama film directed by Per G. Holmgren and starring Kenne Fant, Gunnar Sjöberg and Sven-Eric Gamble. It was shot at the Malmö Studios of Svensk Talfilm. The film's sets were designed by art director Nils Nilsson.

== Synopsis ==
A young man is charged with car theft, but is acquitted in court. A social worker is assigned to help him reform, but his hopes to lead an honest life are threatened when an old criminal acquaintance turns up.

== Cast ==
- Kenne Fant as Wille Nilsson
- Nita Värhammar as Karin
- Gunnar Sjöberg as Bo Wärn
- Sven-Eric Gamble as Ärret
- Anders Andelius as Pluto
- Åke Askner as Skägget
- Börje Blomberg as Råttan
- Thure Carlman as Villes far
- Barbro Hiort af Ornäs as Bibbi Nicklasson
- Jarl Kulle as Jänkarn
- Otto Landahl as Verkstadschefen
- Bo Lindström as Verkmästaren
- Margot Lindén as Kickan
- Mimi Nelson as Maggi
- Lennart Nyberg as Skrattis
- Per Oscarsson as Stickan
- Anna-Stina Osslund as Britt
- Johan Rosén as Kumpanen
- Stina Ståhle as Märren
- Hans Sundberg as Frotte
- Richard Svanström as Direktör Axelsson
- Kurt Willbing as Frasse
- Fylgia Zadig as Baby
- Britt Ångström as Tony
- Nils Åsblom as Lillen
- Tom Österholm as Gotland

== Bibliography ==
- Iverson, Gunnar, Soderbergh Widding, Astrid & Soila, Tytti. Nordic National Cinemas. Routledge, 2005.
