= Inger Juel =

Swedish actress

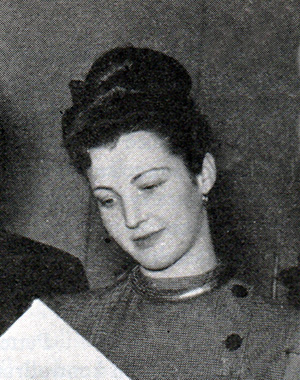
- Born: 18 September 1926; Jönköping, Sweden
- Died: 12 August 1979 (aged 52)
- Occupation: Actress
- Years active: 1948-1968 (film)

Inger Juel (18 September 1926 – 12 August 1979) was a Swedish stage and film actress.

== Selected filmography ==
- The Loveliest Thing on Earth (1947)
- Each Heart Has Its Own Story (1948) as Hildegard
- Vi flyr på Rio (1949) as Karin Åhs
- One Fiancée at a Time (1952)
- The Green Lift (1952)
- The Red Horses (1954)
- Café Lunchrasten (1954)
- Dance on Roses (1954)
- Getting Married (1955)
- Line Six (1958)

== Bibliography ==
- Jerry Vermilye. Ingmar Bergman: His Life and Films. McFarland, 2002.
