= Toivo Pawlo =

Swedish actor (1917–1979)

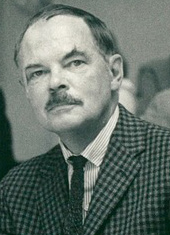
- Toivo Pawlo in 1968
- Born: 25 December 1917; London, England
- Died: 14 June 1979 (aged 61); Stockholm, Sweden
- Occupation: Actor
- Years active: 1943–1978
- Spouse(s): Kerstin Hedeby (m. 1949–1977) Amie Lindahl
- Children: 2, including Rebecca Pawlo

Toivo Pawlo (25 December 1917 – 14 June 1979) was a Swedish film actor. He appeared in 50 films between 1943 and 1978. At the 12th Guldbagge Awards he won the award for Best Actor for his role in the film Hello Baby.

From 1949 to 1977, he was married to Kerstin Hedeby. They are the parents of Swedish actress Rebecca Pawlo.

== Selected filmography ==
- Young Blood (1943)
- The Girl and the Devil (1944)
- Crime and Punishment (1945)
- Number 17 (1949)
- Count Svensson (1951)
- Blue Sky (1955)
- When the Mills are Running (1956)
- Rabies (1958)
- The Magician (1958)
- A Lion in Town (1959)
- The Die Is Cast (1960)
- Hide and Seek (1963)
- Made in Sweden (1969)
- Sagan om Karl-Bertil Jonssons Julafton (1975)
- Hello Baby (1976)
