= Edvard Persson =

Swedish actor (1888–1957)

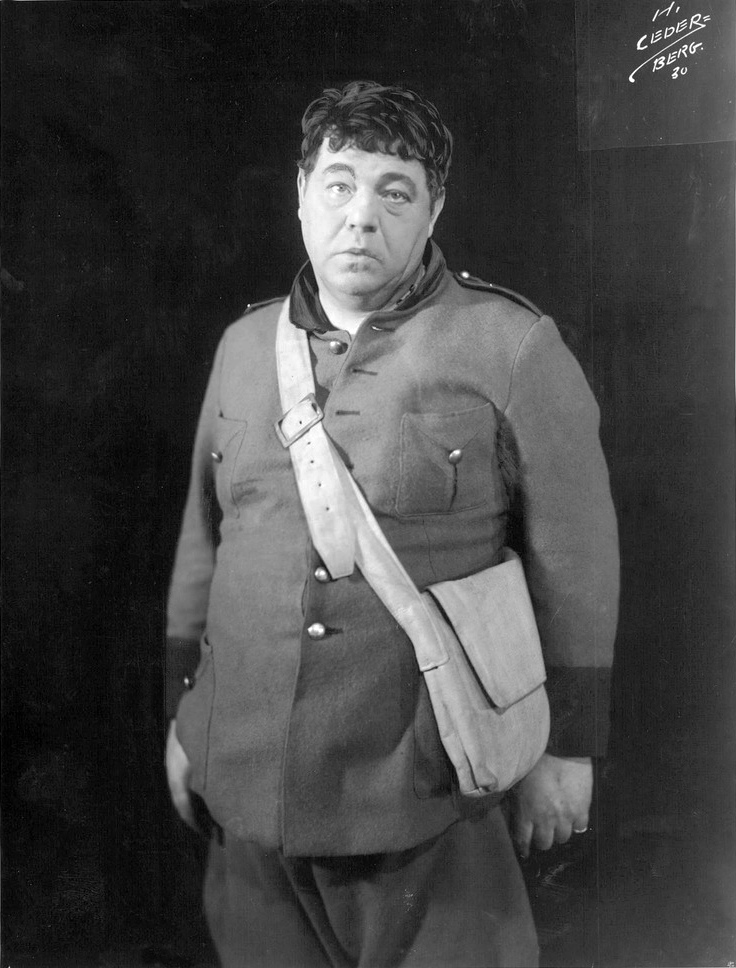
- Persson dressed in character as The Good Soldier Švejk, 1930
- Born: Carl Edvard Persson; 17 January 1888; Malmö, Sweden
- Died: 19 September 1957 (aged 69); Jonstorp, Sweden
- Occupation: Singer • Actor
- Years active: 1924–1956
- Spouses: Ellen Rosengren (m. 1916–1933) Mim Ekelund (m. 1933–1957)

Carl Edvard Persson (17 January 1888 – 19 September 1957) was a Swedish singer and actor. He was a profoundly popular and culturally influential entertainer both nationwide as well as abroad through his versatile work across screen, stage, radio, and record. Born in Malmö, he is known for his Scanian dialect and many portrayals of jovial characters that are stereotypically associated with Scania and its culture.

As the result of an American 1947 invitation, he completed a 100-day tour in the US "Swedish communities" and performed 36 concerts in New York City as well as an additional 35 in other American cities. One of the musicians who accompanied him on tour was Alvar Kraft.

His first screen role was in the 1923 silent film Studenterna på Tröstehult. In total, Persson made 45 feature films, among those were South of the Highway and Kalle på Spången. He was one of the most popular film actors of his time, often playing the same kind of character - the jovial and good-natured man from Scania.

As a singer he released numerous records. Among his more famous songs were Kalle på Spången, Jag har bott vid en landsväg, Jag är en liten gåsapåg från Skåne and Vi klarar oss nog ändå.

He died in Helsingborg.

== Partial filmography ==
- Studenterna på Tröstehult (1924) - Tobias Bruce, informator
- Den gamla herrgården (1925) - Tutor
- Miljonär för en dag (1926) - Kalle 'Blixten' Svensson
- Kvick som Blixten (1927) - Kalle 'Blixten' Svensson
- Vad kvinnan vill (1927) - Kalle Pettersson
- På kryss med Blixten (1927) - Kalle 'Blixten' Svensson
- Hattmakarens bal (1928) - Cederström
- The Southsiders (1932) - 'Lasse' Larsson
- Sten Stensson Stéen från Eslöv på nya äventyr (1932) - Karlsson
- Två hjärtan och en skuta (1932) - Johansson
- Augusta's Little Misstep (1933) - Smulle Månsson
- The Dangerous Game (1933) - Vredberg
- Saturday Nights (1933) - Nappe Johansson
- Secret Svensson (1933) - August Olsson
- Flickorna från Gamla sta'n (1934) - Edvard Larsson
- The Women Around Larsson (1934) - Lasse Larsson
- Close Relations (1935) - Lasse Larsson
- Larsson i andra giftet (1935) - Lasse Larsson, baker
- Our Boy (1936) - Lars Blomquist
- South of the Highway (1936) - Edward Månsson
- Än leva de gamla gudar (1937) - Napoleon Pettersson
- Baldwin's Wedding (1938) - Baldevin
- Skanör-Falsterbo (1939) - Henrik Karlsson
- Kalle's Inn (1939) - Kalle Jeppsson
- Bashful Anton (1940) - Karl Anton Malm
- A Sailor on Horseback (1940) - Lasse Borg
- Sunny Sunberg (1941) - Gunnar Solberg
- Snapphanar (1941) - Grimme Jens
- Sun Over Klara (1942) - Ararat
- Stinsen på Lyckås (1942) - Carl Malm
- Life in the Country (1943) - Zakarias Bräsig
- Turn of the Century (1944) - Squire Munthe
- The Happy Tailor (1945) - Sören Sörenson
- The Bells of the Old Town (1946) - Carl Magnus Berg
- Jens Mansson in America (1947) - Jens Månsson
- Unconquered (1947) - Indian (uncredited)
- Each Heart Has Its Own Story (1948) - Baron Henric Löwencrona af Löwstaborg
- Sven Tusan (1949) - Sven 'Tusan' Jönsson
- Number 17 (1949) - Calle Svensson
- Pimpernel Svensson (1950) - Anders 'Pimpernel' Svensson
- Count Svensson (1951) - Anders Svensson
- The Girl from Backafall (1953) - Silla-Sven
- A Night at Glimmingehus (1954) - Nils Jeppsen
- Blue Sky (1955) - Fridolf Rundquist
- When the Mills are Running (1956) - Blomster-Pelle Pettersson (final film role)
