= Folkan =

Former theater in Stockholm, Sweden

Coordinates: 59°20′11″N 18°4′44″E

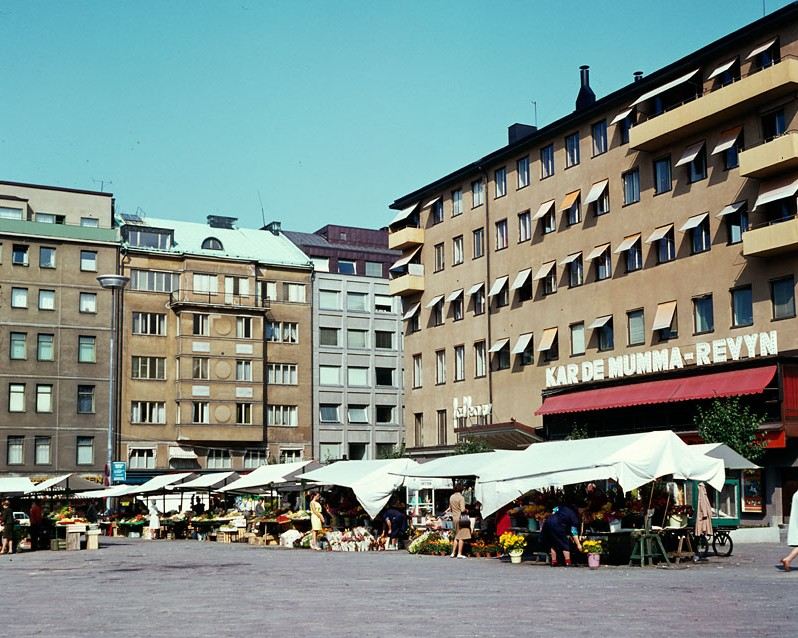
Folkan in 1968

Folkan (also known as Folkteatern, English: People's Theater) was a theatre at Östermalmstorg in Stockholm, Sweden. It was built in 1856 and demolished in 2008 because of problems with the foundation. The theatre was called Ladugårdslandsteatern when it was built, but was renamed to Bijou-teatern in 1877. It got the name Folkan in 1887.
