= Mim Persson =

Swedish actress

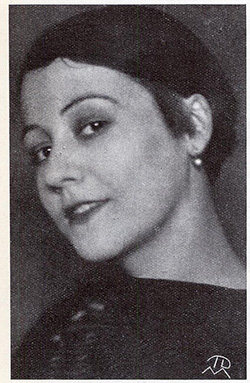
- Persson in 1927.
- Born: Ida Elisabet Hanna Hilda Sofia Ekelund; 8 November 1902; Lund, Sweden
- Died: 16 November 1982 (aged 80); Helsingborg, Sweden
- Other name: Mim Ekelund
- Occupation: Actress
- Years active: 1924–1956 (film)
- Spouse: Edvard Persson (m. 1933; died 1957)

Mim Persson (born Ida Elisabet Hanna Hilda Sofia Ekelund; 8 November 1902 – 16 November 1982) was a Swedish film actress. She was married to the actor Edvard Persson and co-starred in several films with him, including When the Mills are Running (1956), which was the last film that Edvard Persson appeared in, before his death in 1957.

== Selected filmography ==
- Black Roses (1932)
- South of the Highway (1936)
- Kalle's Inn (1939)
- A Sailor on Horseback (1940)
- Life in the Country (1943)
- Turn of the Century (1944)
- The Happy Tailor (1945)
- Jens Mansson in America (1947)
- Count Svensson (1951)
- The Girl from Backafall (1953)
- Blue Sky (1955)
- When the Mills are Running (1956)

== Bibliography ==
- Qvist, Per Olov & von Bagh, Peter. Guide to the Cinema of Sweden and Finland. Greenwood Publishing Group, 2000.
