= Kar de Mumma =

Swedish writer and playwright

Erik Harald Zetterström
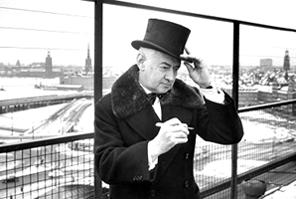
- Erik Zetterström near the Katarina Elevator in 1966
- Born: 14 August 1904; Hedvig Eleonora Parish, Stockholm, Sweden
- Died: 7 July 1997 (aged 92); Engelbrekt Parish, Stockholm, Sweden
- Writing career
- Pen name: Kar de Mumma
- Language: Swedish
- Genre: humour

Erik Harald Zetterström (14 August 1904 – 7 July 1997), better known by his screen name Kar de Mumma, was a Swedish humorous writer and playwright. His pen name can be read as Car da Mon in Swedish.

In the 1920s and 1930s, he wrote many of the most appreciated Swedish revues. 1956–1978, the revues he wrote for Folkan (Folk-theater) in Stockholm (among them the Kar de Mumma revue) became an institution on the Swedish theatre scene.

Erik Harald Zetterström, better known by his pen name Kar de Mumma, was a Swedish writer, humorist and playwright. He became a familiar figure in Swedish cultural life during the 20th century, particularly through his newspaper columns and work in theatre.

Zetterström wrote for Svenska Dagbladet from 1922 until the mid-1990s, maintaining a remarkably long relationship with the newspaper. His columns often dealt with everyday life, personal memories and observations about society, usually presented with a light and humorous touch.

For about thirty years, he also published a book each autumn containing selections from his columns, along with memories and personal reflections. These annual books became an important part of his work and introduced his writing to several generations of Swedish readers.

His career extended beyond journalism. He wrote numerous revues and plays and became particularly associated with the Kar de Mumma revues at Stockholm's Folkan theatre. His work in newspapers, books and theatre made him a recognisable figure in Swedish popular culture for much of the 20th century.

Rather than being known for one particular work, Kar de Mumma is remembered for the consistency and longevity of his career. His writing combined everyday observations with humour and personal reflection, allowing him to remain a familiar presence in Swedish newspapers and entertainment for decades.
