= Europafilm =

Swedish film production company

Europafilm was an influential Swedish film company established in 1929 by Schamyl Bauman and Gustaf Scheutz.

The office was located at Kungsgatan in central Stockholm, while the film studio was located in Mariehäll, Bromma, northwest of Stockholm city. It was acquired by Bonnier in 1984 and merged with Svensk Filmindustri in 1985. It was best known for the films starring Edvard Persson.

Aside from its film activities Europafilm also manufactured electroforming equipment for the vinyl record manufacturing industry. This division was later sold to the now defunct Alpha Toolex AB of Sundyberg, Sweden manufacturers of vinyl record pressing machinery. Both Europafilm plating equipment and Alpha Toolex pressing equipment is still considered to be the finest engineered equipment in their respective categories.
