= Linnéa Edgren =

Swedish actress (1904–1981)

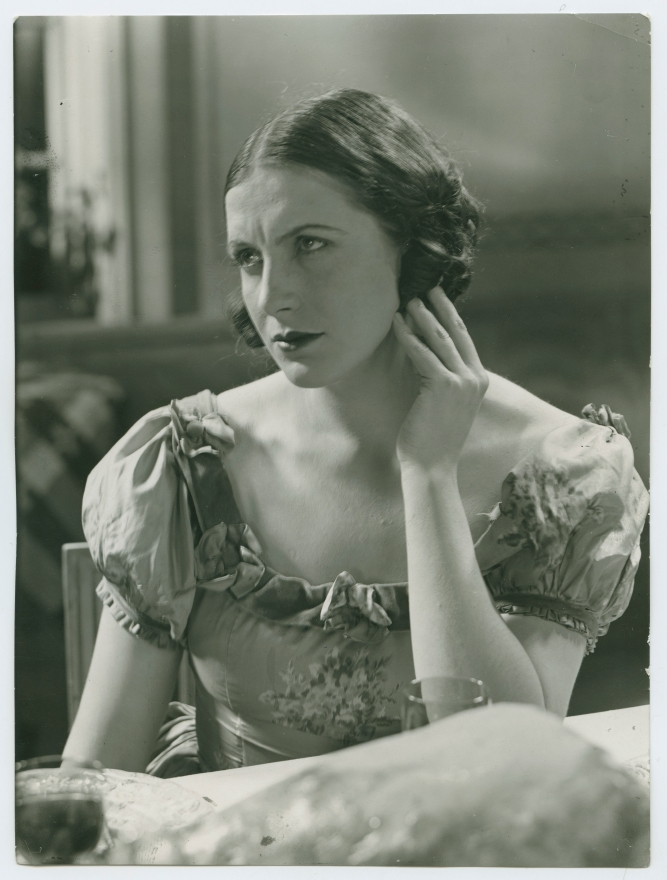
- Linnéa Edgren in Värmlänningarna (1932)
- Born: Syster Linnéa Spångberg; March 11, 1904; Ludvika, Dalarna County, Sweden
- Died: May 23, 1981 (aged 77); Bromma, Stockholm County, Sweden
- Resting place: Nya kyrkogården, Kristinehamn, Värmland; 59.3050°N 14.0811°E
- Occupation: Actress
- Years active: 1926–1959
- Spouse: Gustaf Edgren (m. 1927; died 1954)
- Children: 3
- Parents: Anders Gustaf Olsson (father); Anna Lovisa Spångberg (mother)
- Relatives: Sten Spångberg (brother); August Spångberg (half-brother)

Linnéa Edgren (née Spångberg; 11 March 1904 – 23 May 1981) was a Swedish actress who appeared in both silent and sound films during the early to mid-20th century. Known for her authentic portrayals of domestic and rural characters, she worked with many of Sweden's most distinguished actors and appeared in films that gained international recognition.

== Biography ==
=== Early life and family ===
Syster Linnéa Spångberg was born in 1904 in Ludvika, Dalarna County, Sweden, to Anna Lovisa Spångberg (1870–1916) and Anders Gustaf Olsson. She had an older brother, Sten Sixten Spångberg (1900–1970), and an older half-brother, August Spångberg (1893–1987).

Linnéa's childhood was marked by frequent relocations. She, her mother, and her two brothers moved between various settlements in Värmland and Örebro counties, including Granbergsdal in Karlskoga, Örebro, the steel mill at Öfalla in Nora, Örebro, Hofvilsrud in Eda, Värmland, and eventually Charlottenberg in Eda.

Following their mother's death in 1916, 12-year-old Linnéa and 16-year-old Sten were placed in separate foster homes. Linnéa continued her studies, while Sten found work at a sawmill. Eventually, August secured a small apartment with a single room and a kitchen, allowing the siblings to reunite.

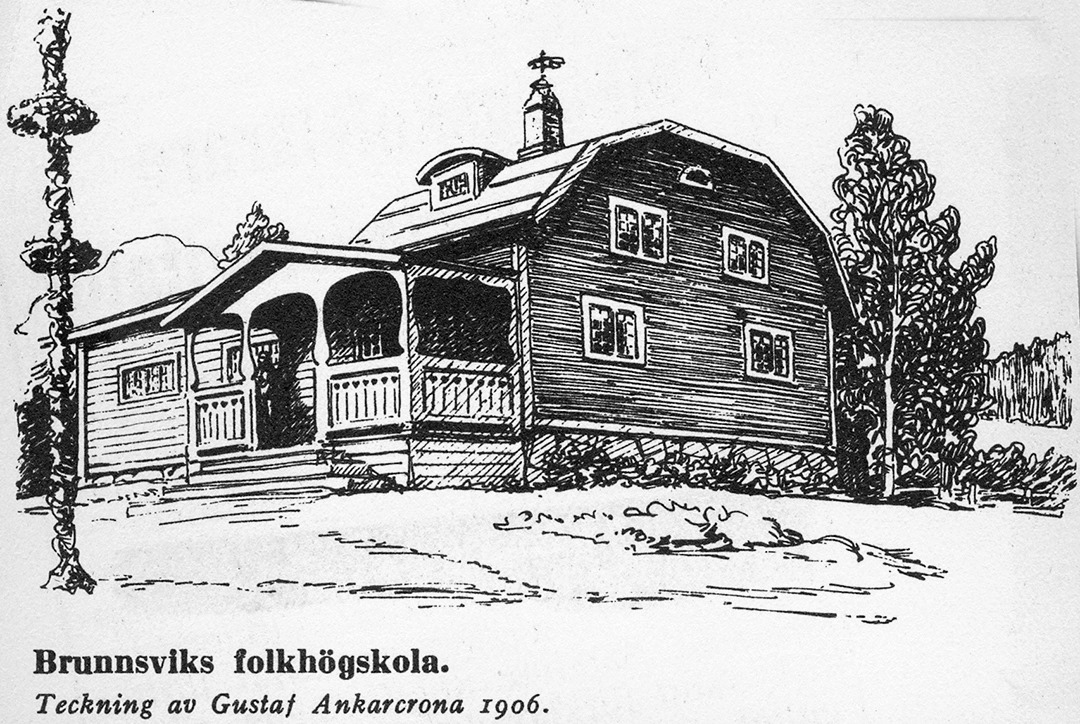
Brunnsviks folkhögskola, 1906

Linnéa developed her talents as a performer and teacher through the Barngillet (Children's Guild) pre-school program, where she was noted as a gifted reciter of poetry and literary works at meetings and events. By 1924, Linnéa and her brother August (now a member of parliament) were in Kiruna, the northernmost city in Sweden, where he worked as a political labor organizer. At an April 1924 meeting of the Kiruna Communist workers' commune, she gave a recitation of two poems by Ture Nerman; she continued through the summer in the local youth club's programs for public speaking, music, and recitation. In October 1924, she acted in a Kiruna Folkteater production of the one-act French farce Lika mot lika (Like Against Like). Soon after, she returned to her hometown of Ludvika to complete her education at Brunnsvik Folk High School.

=== Marriage and children ===
On 29 September 1927, when Linnéa was 23, she married film director Gustaf Edgren, a widower and major figure in Swedish cinema, in a civil ceremony in Stockholm. They had three children—Britt-Lis, Bengt, and Björn—all of whom were child actors. She remained married to Gustaf Edgren until his death in 1954.

=== Career ===
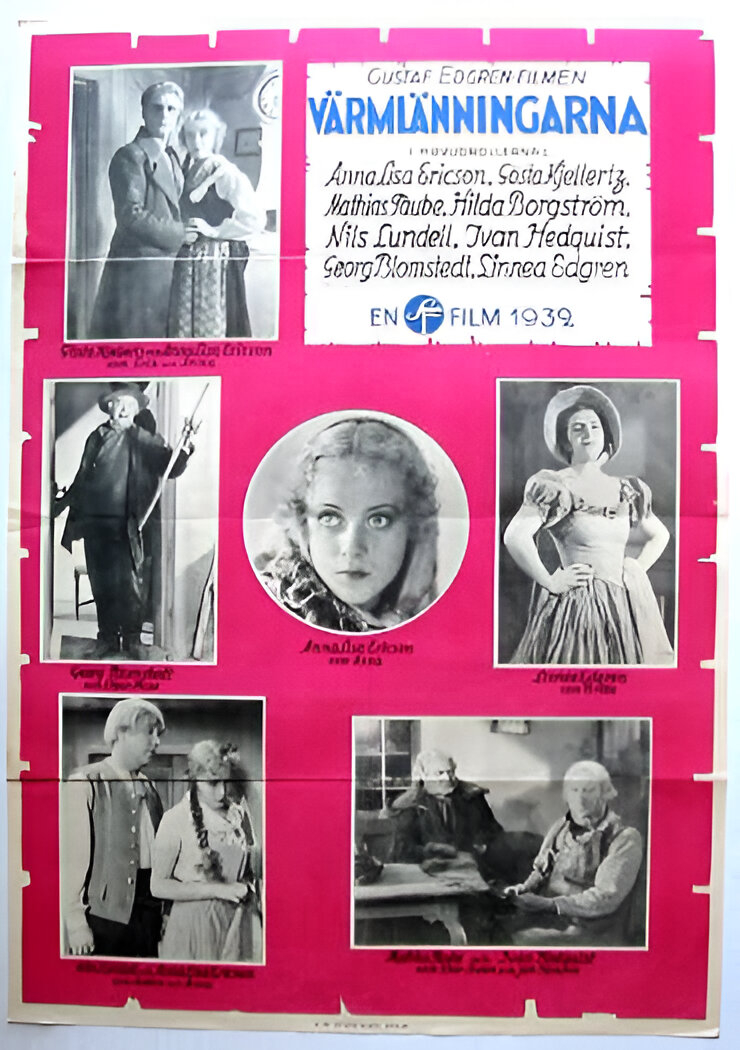
Värmlänningarna (1932) Poster. Top Left: Gösta Kjellertz with Annalisa Ericson; Middle: Georg Blomstedt, Annalisa Ericson, Linnéa Edgren; Bottom: Nils Lundell with Annalisa Ericson; Mathias Taube with Ivan Hedqvist.

Spångberg made her professional stage debut on 31 December 1926 in Skärgårdsflirt på vift (A Flirt in the Archipelago on the Road) as part of the touring company for the play Skärgårdsflirt. The tour, directed by Gustaf Edgren and starring Fridolf Rhudin reprising his original Stockholm role, premiered in Jönköping and continued through the provinces into early 1927. Edgren and Spångberg married later that year.

In 1927, she made her screen debut in Gustaf Edgren's Spökbaronen (The Ghost Baron), playing Anna the maid. She appeared in both silent and sound films over the course of her career. Though she appeared in a relatively small number of productions, her performances were praised for their understated realism, warmth, and authenticity. She worked alongside many of Sweden's most distinguished actors, including Ingrid Bergman, Victor Sjöström, Gösta Ekman, Thor Modéen, Fridolf Rhudin, and Annalisa Ericson.

Her most significant role came in 1932 with Värmlänningarna (The Värmlanders), where she played Brita, the daughter of Rik-Ola and rival to the protagonist Anna. The film, based on Fredrik August Dahlgren's popular play, opened at New York's Fifth Avenue Playhouse and was reviewed positively by The New York Times. The review noted that "the acting is convincing" and specifically described Edgren's character as "the rather spiteful Brita."

=== Death ===
Linnéa Edgren died in Bromma, Stockholm, in 1981 at the age of 77. She is interred at Nya kyrkogården, Karlstad, Värmland County with family members.

== Filmography ==
- 1927 — Spökbaronen (The Ghost Baron); Role: Anna, the maid; Director: Gustaf Edgren.
- 1928 — Svarte Rudolf (Black Rudolf); Role: Inga Österman; Director: Gustaf Edgren.
- 1932 — Värmlänningarna (The Värmlanders); Role: Brita, Rik-Ola's daughter (Anna's rival); Director: Gustaf Edgren.
- 1935 — Valborgsmässoafton (Walpurgis Night); Role: A daughter-in-law of Fredrik Bergström; Director: Gustaf Edgren.
- 1936 — Johan Ulfstjerna; Role: The Countess; Director: Gustaf Edgren.
- 1959 — För katten (For Heaven's Sake [lit. "For the cat"]); Role: "tant Skvaller" (lit. "Gossipy Lady"); Director: Gunnar Skoglund.

== Bibliography ==
- "Skärgårdsflirt i Jönköping". Dagens Nyheter (in Swedish). 2 January 1927.
- "Bröllop". Dagens Nyheter (in Swedish). 30 September 1927.
- FamilySearch (2025a). "Karlskoga, Örebro, Sweden records". FamilySearch. Landsarkivet i Uppsala, page 151 of 315. Image Group Number: 104119897.
- FamilySearch (2025b). "Eda, Värmland, Sweden records". FamilySearch. Sverige. Värmlandsarkiv (Karlstad), page 302 of 407. Image Group Number: 104124435.
- FamilySearch (2025c). "Eda, Värmland, Sweden records". FamilySearch. Sverige. Värmlandsarkiv (Karlstad), page 72 of 224. Image Group Number: 104124439.
- Gravar.se (2025). "Anna Lovisa Spångberg".
- "Kiruna Folkteater". Norrbottens-Kuriren (in Swedish). 5 April 1918.
- "Ett angenämt samkväm". Norrskensflamman (in Swedish). 22 April 1924. p. 3.
- "Kommunistiska ungdomen i Kiruna utför framgångsrikt arbete på flera områden". Norrskensflamman (in Swedish). 1 August 1924. p. 1.
- "Kiruna kommunistiska ungdomsklubb". Norrskensflamman (in Swedish). 31 October 1924. p. 5.
- Riksarkivet (2025). "Censuses (Sweden's population) 1910".
- Riksarkivet (2025b). "Ingeborg Censuses (Sweden's population) 1930".
- Spångberg, August (1966). I tidens ström (PDF). Stockholm: Bok o. bild. Archived from the original (PDF) on 18 August 2010.
- Svenska Filminstitutet (2025a). "Linnéa Edgren". Svensk Filmdatabas.
- Svenska Filminstitutet (2025b). "Britt-Lis Edgren". Svensk Filmdatabas.
- Svenska Filminstitutet (2025c). "Bengt Edgren". Svensk Filmdatabas.
- Svenska Filminstitutet (2025d). "Björn Edgren". Svensk Filmdatabas.
- Svenska Filminstitutet (2025e). "Valborgsmässoafton (1935)". Svensk Filmdatabas.
- Svenska Filminstitutet (2025f). "Johan Ulfstjerna (1936)". Svensk Filmdatabas.
- Svenska Filminstitutet (2025g). "För katten (1959)". Svensk Filmdatabas.
- Svenska Filminstitutet (2025h). "Svarte Rudolf (1928)". Svensk Filmdatabas.
- Svenska Filminstitutet (2025i). "Spökbaronen (1927)". Svensk Filmdatabas.
- Svenska Filminstitutet (2025j). "Värmlänningarna (1932)". Svensk Filmdatabas.
- SvenskaGravar.se (2025). "Linnéa Edgren".
- "A Swedish Film". The New York Times. 18 November 1932.
