= First Mate Karlsson's Sweethearts =

First Mate Karlsson's Sweethearts may refer to:

- First Mate Karlsson's Sweethearts (1925 film), a Swedish silent comedy film
- Styrman Karlssons flammor (First Mate Karlsson's Sweethearts), a 1938 Swedish film comedy
