= Blondie, Beef and the Banana =

1952 film

- Directed by: Lars-Eric Kjellgren
- Written by: Gösta Stevens
- Based on: Biffen och Bananen by Jan-Erik Garland
- Produced by: Allan Ekelund
- Starring: Åke Grönberg; Åke Söderblom; Doris Svedlund
- Cinematography: Martin Bodin
- Edited by: Oscar Rosander
- Music by: Eskil Eckert-Lundin; Herbert Stéen
- Production company: Fribergs Filmbyrå
- Distributed by: Fribergs Filmbyrå
- Release date: 30 August 1952
- Running time: 83 minutes
- Country: Sweden
- Language: Swedish

Blondie, Beef and the Banana (Swedish: Blondie Biffen och Bananen) is a 1952 Swedish comedy film directed by Lars-Eric Kjellgren and starring Åke Grönberg, Åke Söderblom and Doris Svedlund. It was shot at the Råsunda Studios in Stockholm. The film's sets were designed by the art director Nils Svenwall. It is an adaptation of the long-running comic strip of the same title by Jan-Erik Garland. The second of a trilogy of films, it was preceded by Beef and the Banana (1951) and followed by Klarar Bananen Biffen? (1957).

== Cast ==
- Åke Grönberg as Biffen Johansson
- Åke Söderblom as Bananen Jansson
- Doris Svedlund as Anita Becker
- Lennart Lindberg as Georg Hector
- Håkan Westergren as Rudolf Carlman
- Emy Hagman as Bojan
- Git Gay as Lou-Lou Andersson
- Haide Göransson as Anita's Friend
- Erik 'Bullen' Berglund as Rich Horse Buyer
- Wiktor Andersson as Andersson
- Harry Ahlin as Auctionist
- Jules Berman as Conferencier
- David Erikson as Horse Better
- Karl Erik Flens as Horse Jockey
- Åke Jensen as Man at Ulriksdal
- Arne Källerud as Betting cashier
- Lars Kåge as Man at Ulriksdal
- Guje Lagerwall as Miss Berg
- Nils Ohlin as Director Hoffman
- Mille Schmidt as Bartender
- Mauritz Strömbom as Speculative Buyer
- Eric von Gegerfelt as Speculative Buyer
- Alf Östlund as Speculative Buyer

== Bibliography ==
- Wredlund, Bertil & Lindfors, Rolf . Långfilm i Sverige: 1950–1959. Proprius, 1979.
