= Edgren =

Edgren is a Swedish surname. Notable people with the surname include:

- Amanda Edgren, Swedish footballer
- August Hjalmar Edgren (1840–1903), Swedish-born American linguist
- Gustaf Edgren (1895–1954), Swedish film director, screenwriter, and producer
- John Alexis Edgren (1839–1908), Swedish-born American Baptist minister
- Linnéa Edgren (1904–1981), Swedish actress
- Robert W. Edgren (1874–1939), American cartoonist, reporter and editor

== See also ==
- Anne Charlotte Edgren-Leffler (1849–1892), Swedish author
