= Biffen och Bananen =

Biffen och Bananen (the Beef and the Banana) was a comic strip by Rit-Ola (Jan-Erik Garland), originally published in Folket i Bild in 1936, where it ran until 1978. The strip was also published in albums and in the Swedish comic book 91:an.

== Description ==
The comic is about two friends, the strong Biffen (based on the heavyweight boxer Harry Dahlgren) and the intelligent Bananen (based on Rit-Ola himself). Their adventures were often set in or around Stockholm, or on vacation in Africa and southern Europe. The setting was often athletic, and all characters spoke Stockholmska. After a few years the duo was accompanied by a third character, Galento, named after the boxer Tony Galento.

Rit-Ola was given rather loose directions for the comics: he was required to avoid the topics of drunkenness and rape; he was obliged to deliver the strip four to five weeks prior to the publication date; and the comic must be drawn in black, white, and red.

Three movies were made about the characters: Beef and the Banana (1951), Blondie, Biffen och Bananen (1952), and Klarar Bananen Biffen? (1957). Biffen was played by Åke Grönberg and Bananen by Åke Söderblom.
