= Russian Flu (film) =

1937 film

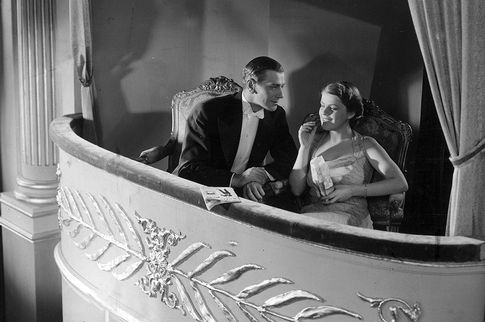
- Edvin Adolphson and Sickan Carlsson
- Directed by: Gustaf Edgren
- Starring: Åke Söderblom; Karin Swanström; Sickan Carlsson
- Cinematography: Åke Dahlqvist
- Edited by: Rolf Husberg
- Music by: Eric Bengtson
- Production company: Svensk Filmindustri
- Release date: 22 February 1937
- Running time: 86 minutes
- Country: Sweden
- Language: Swedish

Russian Flu (Swedish: Ryska snuvan) is a 1937 Swedish comedy film directed by Gustaf Edgren and starring Åke Söderblom, Karin Swanström and Sickan Carlsson. It was the second Swedish film of the Norwegian actress Kirsten Heiberg.

The film featured in the 1988 documentary Gustaf Edgren - flitig, folklig, framgångsrik.

The film's sets were designed by the art director Arne Åkermark.

== Main cast ==
- Åke Söderblom as Kalle Brodin
- Karin Swanström as Mrs. Brodin
- Sickan Carlsson as Bojan
- Kirsten Heiberg as Nadja Ivanovna
- Edvin Adolphson as Nikolajevitj
- Anders Henrikson as Grischa
- Erik 'Bullen' Berglund as Paul
- Nils Jacobsson as Ernst Rolf
- Olof Winnerstrand as Köhler
- Ivar Kåge as Köhler's Friend
- Olof Sandborg as Colonel
- Katie Rolfsen as Ciceron
- Eric Gustafson as Gulaschbaron
- Elof Ahrle as Den svenske maskinreparatören i Moskva
- Georg Rydeberg as A man
- Tom Walter as Partikamrat
- Holger Löwenadler as Socialdemokratisk talare
- Viran Rydkvist as Petruschka

== Bibliography ==
- Per Olov Qvist & Peter von Bagh, Guide to the Cinema of Sweden and Finland. Greenwood Publishing Group, 2000.
