= Kristin Commands =

1946 film

- Directed by: Gustaf Edgren
- Written by: Gardar Sahlberg; Gustaf Edgren; Theodor Berthels
- Starring: Dagmar Ebbesen; Wanda Rothgardt; Gunnar Björnstrand
- Cinematography: Åke Dahlqvist
- Edited by: Oscar Rosander
- Music by: Jules Sylvain
- Production company: Kungsfilm
- Release date: 3 September 1946
- Running time: 96 minutes
- Country: Sweden
- Language: Swedish

Kristin Commands (Swedish: Kristin kommenderar) is a 1946 Swedish comedy film directed by Gustaf Edgren and starring Dagmar Ebbesen, Wanda Rothgardt and Gunnar Björnstrand.

The film's sets were designed by the art director Nils Svenwall.

== Cast ==
- Dagmar Ebbesen as Kristin Carlsson
- Wanda Rothgardt as Marianne Westman
- Gunnar Björnstrand as Dr. Westman Senior / Vilhelm Westman
- John Elfström as Herman Karlsson
- Olle Florin as Olle Elwing
- Gabriel Alw as Professor
- Margit Andelius as Janitor's Wife
- Ann-Charlotte Bergman as Maj Westman
- Margaretha Bergström as Nurse
- Signhild Björkman as Office Clerk
- Tor Borong as The Crook
- Erland Colliander as Farmer
- Nils Dahlgren as Pawn Broker
- Carl Deurell as Promotor
- Sture Djerf as Police Officer
- Åke Engfeldt as Runqvist
- Ulf Eriksson as Go-Between
- Vera Fränkel as Nurse
- Hugo Hasslo as Farmer
- Sten Hedlund as Doctor
- Olle Hilding as Man at Auction
- Gösta Holmström as Student
- Svea Holst as Old Woman in Staircase
- Nils Jacobsson as Djurgårds-Kalle
- Margit Jonje as Woman from Småland
- Helge Karlsson as Auctionist
- Magnus Kesster as Man at Hospital
- Ivar Kåge as Professor
- Arne Lindblad as Janitor Hansson
- Ulla Malmström as Girl from Dalarna
- Börje Mellvig as Torre
- Gull Natorp as Hanna - Deaf Lady
- Nils Nordståhl as Editor
- Marianne Orlando as Kristin as Child
- Per Oscarsson as Jan Westman
- Willy Peters as Young Man
- Margit Pettersson as Sonja Westman
- Kristina Ranå as Girl from Kristinehamn
- Olav Riégo as Professor
- Sif Ruud as Applicant for Position
- Hanny Schedin as Kristin's mother
- Tord Stål as Opponent
- Bojan Westin as Ella
- Carla Wiberg as Emma
- Signe Wirff as Patient
- Inga-Lill Åhström as Patient
- Brita Öberg as Cleaning Lady

== Bibliography ==
- Per Olov Qvist & Peter von Bagh. Guide to the Cinema of Sweden and Finland. Greenwood Publishing Group, 2000.
