= The Österman Brothers' Virago =

The Österman Brothers' Virago (Swedish: Bröderna Östermans huskors) may refer to:

- The Österman Brothers' Virago a 1913 play by Oscar Wennersten
- The Österman Brothers' Virago (1925 film), a silent film adaptation directed by William Larsson
- The Österman Brothers' Virago (1932 film), a Swedish film adaptation directed by Thure Alfe
- The Österman Brothers' Virago (1945 film), a Swedish film adaptation directed by Ivar Johansson

== See also ==
- En pige uden lige, a 1943 Danish version of the play directed by Jon Iversen
