= Kan du vissla Johanna? =

Kan du vissla Johanna? may refer to

- Kan du vissla Johanna? (song)
- Can You Whistle, Johanna? (book)
- Kan du vissla Johanna? (film)
