= Enrique Riveros =

Chilean actor

Enrique Riveros Fernandez (1906–1954), was a Chilean actor who worked primarily in films in France, most notably with directors Jean Renoir and Jean Cocteau, before retiring from the screen and moving back to Chile to raise his children.

== Early life and career ==
Riveros was born in San Fernando, Chile, the eldest son of prominent businessman Enrique Riveros and Mrs. Hortensia Fernández Prado. As a teenager he traveled to Paris in 1922 to study agronomy, but promptly and against his family's wishes, became involved in the Parisian art world and avant-garde film scene of the era, mingling with: Picasso, Man Ray, Gertrude Stein, Coco Chanel, Luis Buñuel, Lee Miller, the Viscount de Noailles, among others, that formed the social circle that unfolded for ten years and where he developed his acting career.

== Later career and retirement ==
Enrique Riveros worked in Europe as a leading man in more than fifteen films, which include Spökbaronen directed by Gustaf Edgren (1927), Majestät schneidet Bubiköpfe directed by Ragnar Hyltén-Cavallius (1928), Le tournoi dans la cite (1928) and Le bled (1929), directed by Jean Renoir, obtaining the latter film the award of the French Government at the time. In 1930, Riveros appeared as the protagonist of The Blood of a Poet, the first film by the artist and French intellectual Jean Cocteau, this avant-garde film is considered one of the highlights of surrealism. Some of his other roles of the decade were works in films by: Alberto Cavalcanti, Dans une île perdue (1931), À mi-chemin du ciel (1931) and Wine Cellars (1930) directed by Benito Perojo, with the actress and singer Concha Piquer as co-star and Nicole et sa vertu (1932) by Rene Hervil, among others. Before the outbreak of World War II, Enrique Riveros returned to Chile, where he worked on a couple of film projects and starred in the film El hombre que se llevaron (1946) by Jorge "Coke" Delano, with the role of defendant Alberto Rivero received the prize for Best Actor National Film. Riveros died in 1954, leaving a legacy all but forgotten.

== Selected filmography ==
- My Priest Among the Poor (1926)
- The Ghost Baron (1927)
- Le Bled (1929)
- The Blood of a Poet (1930)
- The Picador (1932)
- Nicole and Her Virtue (1932)
