= The Red Day =

1931 film

- Directed by: Gustaf Edgren
- Written by: Sölve Cederstrand; Gustaf Edgren; Erik Lindorm (play)
- Starring: Sigurd Wallén; Dagmar Ebbesen; Sture Lagerwall
- Cinematography: Åke Dahlqvist
- Music by: Eric Bengtson
- Production companies: Svensk Filmindustri; Film AB Minerva
- Distributed by: Svensk Filmindustri
- Release date: 13 April 1931
- Running time: 74 minutes
- Country: Sweden
- Language: Swedish

The Red Day (Swedish: Röda dagen) is a 1931 Swedish comedy film directed by Gustaf Edgren and starring Sigurd Wallén, Dagmar Ebbesen and Sture Lagerwall. It is based on Erik Lindorm's play of the same name. The film was shot at the Råsunda Studios in Stockholm and its sets designed by the art director Vilhelm Bryde.

== Cast ==
- Sigurd Wallén as Gustaf Andersson
- Dagmar Ebbesen as Augusta Andersson
- Sture Lagerwall as Jideon Andersson
- Lill-Tollie Zellman as Agnes Andersson
- John W. Brunius as Wibäck, manager
- Nils Jacobsson as Stig Wibäck
- Richard Lindström as Atterdag Hellberg
- Signe Deurell as Mrs. Hellberg
- Eric Abrahamsson as Göransson
- Charlie Almlöf as Winge
- Erik 'Bullen' Berglund as Police inspector
- Georg Funkquist as Johansson
- Håkan Westergren as Georg Holmbärj - speaker
- Helge Andersson as Communist
- Berndt Aulin as Communist bill-poster
- Erik Baumann as Pianist at Tattersall
- Frithiof Bjärne as Police officer
- Ernst Brunman as Police officer
- Thor Christiernsson as Door-keeper
- Bertil Ehrenmark as Recording Clerk
- Gösta Granberg as Communist speaker
- Paul Hagman as Fascist speaker
- Wictor Hagman as Fascist speaker
- Gustaf Hiort af Ornäs as Guest at Tatersall
- Maja Jerlström as Wibäck's house-maid
- Olof Krook as Police officer
- Herman Lantz as Police arresting Jideon
- Åke Uppström as Fascist bill-poster
- Dag Wirén as Cellist

== Bibliography ==
- Qvist, Per Olov & von Bagh, Peter. Guide to the Cinema of Sweden and Finland. Greenwood Publishing Group, 2000.
