= Märta Ekström =

Swedish actress (1899–1952)

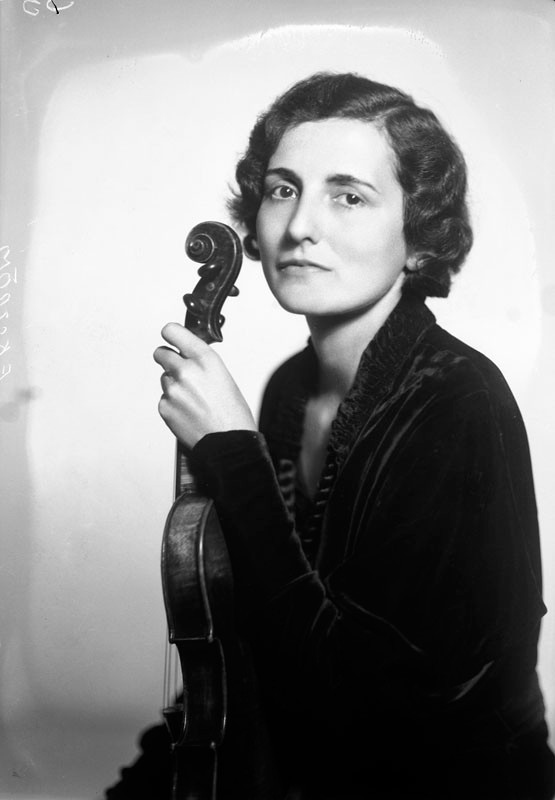
- Born: Märta Valborg Ekström; 28 January 1899; Värmdö, Sweden
- Died: 23 January 1952 (aged 52); Stockholm, Sweden
- Education: Royal Swedish Academy of Music; Royal Dramatic Training Academy
- Occupation: Actress
- Years active: 1921–1948
- Spouse(s): Alf Sjöberg (1930–1934); Frank Sundström (1937–1947)

Märta Valborg Ekström (28 January 1899 – 23 January 1952) was a Swedish stage and film actress.

== Selected filmography ==
- Charles XII (1925)
- Ingmar's Inheritance (1925)
- The Doctor's Secret (1930)
- The Two of Us (1930)
- Unga hjärtan (1934)
- John Ericsson, Victor of Hampton Roads (1937)
- Katrina (1943)
- The Emperor of Portugallia (1944)
