= Beef and the Banana =

1951 film

- Directed by: Rolf Husberg
- Written by: Gösta Stevens
- Based on: Biffen och Bananen by Jan-Erik Garland
- Produced by: Helge Hagerman
- Starring: Åke Grönberg; Åke Söderblom; Lillebil Kjellén
- Cinematography: Åke Dahlqvist; Gunnar Fischer
- Edited by: Oscar Rosander
- Music by: Jerry Högstedt
- Production company: Fribergs Filmbyrå
- Distributed by: Fribergs Filmbyrå
- Release date: 12 February 1951
- Running time: 95 minutes
- Country: Sweden
- Language: Swedish

Beef and the Banana (Swedish: Biffen och Bananen) is a 1951 Swedish comedy film directed by Rolf Husberg and starring Åke Grönberg, Åke Söderblom and Lillebil Kjellén. It was shot at the Råsunda Studios in Stockholm and on location in a variety of settings. The film's sets were designed by the art director Nils Svenwall.

It is an adaptation of the long-running comic strip of the same title by Jan-Erik Garland. It was followed by two sequels Blondie, Beef and the Banana (1952) and Klarar Bananen Biffen? (1957), with the two leading actors reprising their roles.

== Synopsis ==
Two men with contrasting personalities work together in a bicycle factory. One is a meat-eater and the other a vegetarian.

== Cast ==
- Åke Grönberg as Biffen
- Åke Söderblom as Bananen
- Lillebil Kjellén as Kerstin Carve
- Lennart Lindberg as Stickan Berglund
- Håkan Westergren as Carlsson
- Gösta Prüzelius as Tage Wendel
- Maj Larsson as Ella Öhman
- Siv Larsson as Elsa Öhman
- Harriet Andersson as Girl
- Nils Hultgren as Teacher at Kalmar Slott
- Wiktor Andersson as Customer
- Yngve Lundh as Bicyclist
- Sven 'Svängis' Johansson as Bicyclist
- Nils 'Bagarn' Johansson as Bicyclist
- Rudolf E. Eklöw as Sports journalist
- Jan-Erik Garland as Sports journalist
- Raymond Maës as Swiss bicyclist
- K.G. Norlén a s Holm, supervisor
- Bertil Perrolf as Radio reporter
- Birgit Rogner as Maid
- Oscar Söderlund as Sports journalist

== Bibliography ==
- Qvist, Per Olov & von Bagh, Peter. Guide to the Cinema of Sweden and Finland. Greenwood Publishing Group, 2000.
- Segrave, Kerry & Martin, Linda. The Continental Actress: European Film Stars of the Postwar Era--biographies, Criticism, Filmographies, Bibliographies. McFarland, 1990.
