= The Wedding Trip (1936 film) =

1936 film

- Directed by: Gustaf Molander
- Written by: Gösta Stevens
- Based on: Da stimmt was nicht by Franz Arnold
- Produced by: Stellan Claësson
- Starring: Håkan Westergren; Anne-Marie Brunius; Karin Swanström
- Cinematography: Julius Jaenzon
- Edited by: Oscar Rosander
- Music by: Jules Sylvain
- Production company: Svensk Filmindustri
- Distributed by: Svensk Filmindustri
- Release date: 24 April 1936
- Running time: 90 minutes
- Country: Sweden
- Language: Swedish

The Wedding Trip (Swedish: Bröllopsresan) is a 1936 Swedish comedy film directed by Gustaf Molander and starring Håkan Westergren, Anne-Marie Brunius and Karin Swanström. It was shot at the Råsunda Studios in Stockholm and on location in Copenhagen and on the French Riviera. The film's sets were designed by the art director Arne Åkermark. It is based on the 1932 play Da stimmt was nicht by Franz Arnold.

== Synopsis ==
A businessman takes his daughter Astrid to Copenhagen to get her married, and then plans a honeymoon trip for them to the French Riviera. However the count is unexpectedly called away to London by telegram.

== Cast ==
- Håkan Westergren as Count Erik Lejonsköld
- Anne-Marie Brunius as Astrid Björkman
- Karin Swanström as Countess Julia Lejonsköld
- Erik 'Bullen' Berglund as Jonas Vilhelm Patrick Björkman
- Karin Albihn as Karin Ekberg
- Harry Roeck Hansen as Ekberg
- Ragnar Arvedson as Henty Berhard Gustavsson
- Torsten Winge as Hotel clerk
- Edvin Adolphson as Emanuelo Silvados
- Wiktor Andersson as Private Driver Larsson
- Charlie Almlöf as Frenchman at gas station
- Karin Appelberg-Sandberg as Hotel guest with white hat
- Gösta Bodin as François
- Nils Dahlgren as Man with news paper
- Nils Ekstam as Hotel director
- George Fant as Young man with news paper
- Georg Fernqvist as Private Detective
- Peggy Lindberg as Hair Dresser
- Allan Linder as Bellboy
- Walter Lindström as Private Driver Andersson
- Nils Nordståhl as Employed at hotel
- Olav Riégo as Holm
- Stina Sorbon as Hotel Guest

== Bibliography ==
- Freiburg, Jeanne Ellen. Regulatory Bodies: Gendered Visions of the State in German and Swedish Cinema. University of Minnesota, 1994.
