= The Great Love (1938 film) =

1938 film

- Directed by: Anders Henrikson
- Written by: Victor Skutezky (play); Weyler Hildebrand; Anders Henrikson
- Produced by: Nils Whiten
- Starring: Tutta Rolf; Håkan Westergren; Karin Swanström
- Cinematography: Martin Bodin
- Edited by: Oscar Rosander
- Music by: Eric Bengtson
- Production company: Wivefilm
- Distributed by: Wivefilm
- Release date: 7 March 1938
- Running time: 88 minutes
- Country: Sweden
- Language: Swedish

The Great Love (Swedish: Den stora kärleken) is a 1938 Swedish comedy film directed and co-written by Anders Henrikson and starring Tutta Rolf, Håkan Westergren and Karin Swanström. The film was shot at the Råsunda Studios in Stockholm and its sets designed by the art director Arne Åkermark.

== Synopsis ==
Agenes, a maid, leads a lonely life. A friendly worker at a local food stall tries to cheer her up by inventing a secret romantic admirer.

== Cast ==
- Tutta Rolf as Agnes
- Håkan Westergren as Gustav Fagerlund
- Karin Swanström as Hulda Fagerlund
- Eric Abrahamsson as August Fagerlund
- Marianne Löfgren as Molly
- Elof Ahrle as Kalle
- Magnus Kesster as Hugge
- Vera Lindby as Flora
- Mimi Pollak as Governess
- Douglas Håge as Foreman
- Millan Bolander as Mrs. Grönberg
- Anders Frithiof as Doctor
- Anders Henrikson as Man on Train
- Linnéa Hillberg as Ms. Blomberg
- Jullan Jonsson as Caretaker's Wife
- Gun-Mari Kjellström as Ingeborg

== Bibliography ==
- Qvist, Per Olov & von Bagh, Peter. Guide to the Cinema of Sweden and Finland. Greenwood Publishing Group, 2000.
