= Song of My Heart =

1948 film directed by Benjamin Glazer

- Directed by: Benjamin Glazer
- Written by: Benjamin Glazer; Bernard Schubert
- Produced by: Nat W. Finston; Theodore Reed
- Starring: Frank Sundström; Audrey Long; Cedric Hardwicke
- Cinematography: Roland Totheroh; Curt Courant (uncredited)
- Edited by: Richard V. Heermance
- Music by: Joseph Nussbaum
- Production company: Symphony Films
- Distributed by: Allied Artists Pictures
- Release date: January 31, 1948
- Running time: 85 minutes
- Country: United States
- Language: English

Song of My Heart is a 1948 American historical drama film directed by Benjamin Glazer and starring Frank Sundström, Audrey Long and Cedric Hardwicke. It is a highly fictionalised biopic of the nineteenth century Russian composer Pyotr Ilyich Tchaikovsky. It was distributed by Allied Artists.

== Cast ==
- Frank Sundström as Pyotr Ilyich Tchaikovsky
- Audrey Long as Princess Amalya
- Cedric Hardwicke as Grand Duke
- Mikhail Rasumny as Sergei Ivanov / Stephen Ivanov
- Gale Sherwood as Sophia Mirova
- Serge Krizman as Ivan
- Charles Trowbridge as Jurgensen
- Kate Drain as Nurse
- Lester Sharpe as Nikolai Rubinstein
- Gil Frye as Kolya
- Scott Elliott as Lt. Sanderson
- Gordon B. Clarke as Lt. Julian
- Jimmie Dodd as Pvt. Murphy
- David Leonard as Nikolai Rimsky-Korsakov
- John Hamilton as Czar
- William Ruhl as Cesar Cui
- Steve Darrell as Uniformed Aide
- Robert Barron as Alexander Borodin
- Elvira Curci as Housekeeper
- Maurice Cass as Ballet Master
- Grandon Rhodes as Doctor
- William Newell as Doorman
- Leonard Mudie as Conductor
- Lane Chandler as Policeman
- Leonid Snegoff as Manager
- Lewis Howard as Modest Mussorgsky
- Stan Johnson as Captain Weatherley
- Leo Kaye as Mess Sergeant
- Jack George as Priest
- Vernon Cansino as Evans
- Nina Hansen as Sophie's Mother

== Bibliography ==
- James Wierzbicki. Music in the Age of Anxiety: American Music in the Fifties. University of Illinois Press, 2016.
