= Karin Swanström =

Swedish actress

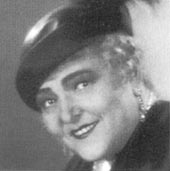
- Born: Karin Sofia Svanström; June 13, 1873
- Died: July 5, 1942 (aged 69); Stockholm
- Occupations: Actress, Producer, Director
- Years active: 1890 - 1942
- Spouse: Stellan Claësson (m. 1915-1942)

Karin Swanström (June 13, 1873 – July 5, 1942) was a Swedish actress, producer and director.

== Early life ==
Swanström was born in St. Olai congregation in Norrköping. Little is known of her life before she was accepted for the Royal Dramatic Theatre school in 1890 when she was seventeen. Already in school her acting ability was acknowledged by her performance in two student plays. In 1892 she left the Royal Dramatic Theater school and was employed by The Royal Dramatic Theater and was in the ensemble for five years. In 1897 Karin Swanström went from the Royal Dramatic Theater to Selander Company, that was run by Hjalmar and Concordia Selander, for a year and then she went to Swedish Theater Company in Helsinki in 1899.

== Career ==
When she came back to Sweden from Helsinki in 1904 she started her own theater company, Karin Swanström Theater Company, that was active and run by Swanström until the early 1920s. She now began teaching acting in Stockholm and did this during the years 1921-25 and at the same time she began acting in silent films with Maurtiz Stiller's De landsflyktige in 1921. The critics loved the film and Swanström, one wrote " as the most beautiful middle aged lady with the greatest scenic routine that you can find". Two years after this Karin Swanström became head of production at Bonnierfilm, and in the same year she directed her first film, but it was for AB Svensk Filmindustri, or SF.

=== Boman på utställningen ===
This film, which translates roughly to Boman at the Fair, is a comedy that takes place during the fair in Gothenburg, in 1923. Swanström had to share her directing credit with the screenwriter Oscar Rydqvist, but "his part in directing the film was more a title than having any say during production". It received even reviews it was said that the film was neither bad or good, it had good, even great, moments but it also had bad parts as a "slow tempo" because of the "large number of attraction shots". It was also seen as being "silly", these attraction shots were of the fair, the film was also seen as an excuse for documenting the fair in Gothenburg.

After Boman at the Fair, she went on to star in six silent films and two of them were The Saga of Gosta Berling part one and two. Of these six films, only two that were produced by Bonnierfilm, so being head of production didn't stop her from taking jobs with competing studios. But her busiest year was 1925. Not only was she teaching acting, but she was also directing two film and had two films coming out at the same time.

=== Kalle Utter ===
Kalle Utter was Swanström's second film, and in it she was the only one credited as director. In Stockholm the film became a critical success; a critic in the newspaper Arbetaren (The Worker) wrote " We have never heard a heartwarming laughter in a cinema and when the picture ended the applauses was forceful and long – a triumph that is rare." The famous Stockholm critic Robin Hood wasn't less enthusiastic " Swedish film is rehabilitated! [...] It might sound strange to call Kalle Utter a woman's film, because Anders de Wahl has the leading role and is to all concerned in the picture from beginning to end. But for us de Wahl isn't the central character, but – Karin Swanström" Robin Hood did celebrate Swanström for her acting but doesn't mention that she's the film's director or on her directing abilities. But Robin Hood wasn't the only one who gave Swanström special attention, Jens Flik from NDA wrote "to adapt the rich experience, that she brings from the stage to tackle cinema's own demands as an art form. You can only hope that, Mrs.Swanström is for the future hired more often than now as a director, it would do our domestic pictures a whole lot of good." The only negative review that was all bad was one that when out of its way to explain how and why the lead actor Anders de Wahl was so bad in the picture and how bad he was as a movie actor.

=== Flying Dutchmen (Flygande Holländren) ===
Flying Dutchmen got a cold reception when it came out. Hjalmar Bergman was seen as a weak point as the adapter of his own book. The story was deemed pale, circumstantial, unfocused and lose in composition. Several critics remarked that the picture was more theatrical than cinematic, but one critic wrote "Karin Swanström direction was because of explainable reasons not able to make any miracles with this Bergmansk screenplay, but you can trace her ambitious work, which is best shown in the details, and that's never wrong". Flying Dutchmen was the first film for Karin Swanström for the new studio Skandinavisk film, the name was new but the studio grounds wasn't Skandinavisk film had take over Bonnierfilms studios. Swanström was also the head of production for this studio as well.

In 1926, something new happened to Karin Swanström: she got her own comedy series at Oscarsteatern (The Oscars Theater) in Stockholm and it lasted from 1926 until 1931.

=== Girl in Tails (Flickan i frack) ===
This is Karin Swanström's last film that she directed, and it's one of her finest films. But the critics were not as positive, but not all bad. "Many found the film as a happy and easy-going summer film and cheerfully bizarre." There was also a feeling that the climax with the confrontation at the ball wasn't as shocking as they thought it was going to be, and there were people who felt the film was paler in comparison too the book. But the critics praised Magda Holm, who played the title role of Katja, for her acting and expressiveness.

== Sound Era ==
After Girl in Tails, Swanström kept on acting in theater and films. In July 1934, she was employed by AB Svensk Filmindustri and soon became a producer, then she was an artistic adviser, and then production manager. In this role, and with her husband being also a production manager, they were heads of production in AB Svensk Filmindustri from 1934 until 1941.

In 1942, Karin Swanström died in Stockholm, aged 69; she was survived by her husband Stellan Claësson.

== Partial filmography ==
- De landsflyktige (1921) - Ivanova Barantscheff
- House Slaves (1923)- Mathilde Rasmussen
- Anna-Clara and Her Brothers (1923) - Aunt
- Boman at the Exhibition (1923) - Mrs. Sjöborg
- The Saga of Gosta Berling (1924) - Gustafva Sinclaire
- Unga greven tar flickan och priset (1924) - Countess Euphrosyne Behrencrona
- 40 Skipper Street (1925) - Mrs. Frendin
- Kalle Utter (1925) - Countess Stjerncrona
- The Flying Dutchman (1925) - Mother Tine
- First Mate Karlsson's Sweethearts (1925) - Bessie Doring
- The Girl in Tails (1926) - Widow Hyltenius
- Only a Dancing Girl (1926) - fru Zentler
- A Sister of Six (1926) - Countess Emilie Hohenstein
- His English Wife (1927) - Mrs. Brock, Cathleen's mother
- Sealed Lips (1927) - Aunt Peppina
- The Ghost Baron (1927) - Countess Stjärnstråle
- A Perfect Gentleman (1927) - Charlotte Ponson
- Parisiennes (1928) - Rose Duval, die Witwe
- Majestät schneidet Bubiköpfe (1928) - Sophie Svensson
- Gustaf Wasa (1928, part 1–2) - Sigbrit
- När rosorna slå ut (1930) - Grevinnan Charlotte
- Lika inför lagen (1931) - Sonja's Relative
- Generalen (1931) - Alexandra
- Trådlöst och kärleksfullt (1931) - Inventor's Hostess
- Tired Theodore (1931) - Rosa Hörneman
- En natt (1931) - Minka
- Longing for the Sea (1931) - Fanny's mother
- Half Way to Heaven (1931) - Madame Jenny
- Black Roses (1932) - Tilda
- Mother-in-Law's Coming (1932) - Mother-in-law
- Sten Stensson Stéen från Eslöv på nya äventyr (1932) - Tuttan Möller
- Servant's Entrance (1932) - Laura Persson, Cook
- Marriageable Daughters (1933) - Emma Lundberg
- Fasters millioner (1934) - Aunt Héléne
- Swedenhielms (1935) - Marta Boman
- Kärlek efter noter (1935) - Mrs. Blomkvist
- The Marriage Game (1935) - Carolina Berg
- På Solsidan (1936) - Margareta Ribe
- The Wedding Trip (1936) - Countess Julia Lejonsköld
- Unfriendly Relations (1936) - Hans tant
- Adventure (1936) - von Bohren
- The Family Secret (1936) - Lillie Ekman
- Russian Flu (1937) - Mrs. Brodin
- The Great Love (1938) - Hulda Fagerlund
- Styrman Karlssons flammor (1938) - Mrs. Ragna Doring
- Sjöcharmörer (1939) - Mrs. Ebba Österman
- Stål (1940) - Mrs. Gouveng
- Juninatten (1940) - Fru Cronsiöö
- Tomorrow's Melody (1942) - Fru Almen (final film role)
