= The Girl from the Marsh Croft (1947 film) =

1947 film by Gustaf Edgren

Tösen från Stormyrtorpet
- Directed by: Gustaf Edgren
- Screenplay by: Oscar Rydqvist; Gustaf Edgren
- Based on: The Girl from the Marsh Croft by Selma Lagerlöf
- Produced by: Inge Ivarson
- Starring: Margareta Fahlén; Alf Kjellin; Sten Lindgren
- Cinematography: Martin Bodin
- Edited by: Tage Holmberg
- Music by: Bengt Wallerström
- Production company: Kungsfilm
- Distributed by: Fribergs Filmbyrå
- Release date: 18 August 1947
- Running time: 94 minutes
- Country: Sweden
- Language: Swedish

The Girl from the Marsh Croft (Swedish: Tösen från Stormyrtorpet) is a 1947 Swedish drama film directed by Gustaf Edgren and starring Margareta Fahlén, Alf Kjellin and Sten Lindgren. It is based on the 1908 novella of the same name by Nobel Prize winning Swedish author Selma Lagerlöf. The film's sets were designed by the art director Nils Svenwall.

== Cast ==
- Margareta Fahlén as Helga
- Alf Kjellin as Gudmund Erlandsson
- Sten Lindgren as Eriksson
- Ingrid Borthen as Hildur
- Keve Hjelm as Johan
- Oscar Ljung as Per Martinsson
- Carl Ström as Erland Erlandsson
- Anna Carlsten as Ingeborg Erlandsson
- Sven d'Ailly as Karl Nilsson
- Inez Lundmark-Hermelin as Helga's Mother
- Gösta Cederlund as Frithiof Pettersson
- Erik Berglund as Svensson
- Artur Rolén as Guest at the party
- Sven Bergvall as Martinsson, Per's father
- Gull Natorp as Fortuneteller
- Ivar Kåge as Priest
- Artur Cederborgh as Parish constable
- Wiktor Andersson as Cryer
- Greta Berthels as Stina, maid at Närlunda
- Gösta Bodin as Major at mayor's ball

== Bibliography ==
- Qvist, Per Olov & von Bagh, Peter. Guide to the Cinema of Sweden and Finland. Greenwood Publishing Group, 2000.
