= His Majesty Must Wait =

1945 film

- Directed by: Gustaf Edgren
- Written by: Oscar Rydqvist (play); Gustaf Edgren
- Produced by: Otto Scheutz
- Starring: Sture Lagerwall; Åke Söderblom; Aino Taube
- Cinematography: Martin Bodin
- Edited by: Oscar Rosander
- Music by: Nils Castegren
- Production company: Kungsfilm
- Distributed by: Kungsfilm
- Release date: 2 July 1945
- Running time: 91 minutes
- Country: Sweden
- Language: Swedish

His Majesty Must Wait (Swedish: Hans Majestat får vänta) is a 1945 Swedish comedy film directed by Gustaf Edgren and starring Sture Lagerwall, Åke Söderblom and Aino Taube. It was shot at the Råsunda Studios in Stockholm. The film's sets were designed by the art director Nils Svenwall and Arne Åkermark.

== Plot ==
Carl-Johan Stjärna is a Swedish aristocrat and one of the chamberlains at the royal palace in Stockholm. He has fallen on seriously hard times and getting by is a struggle. Just when his trusted manservant taken his uniform to a pawnshop around the corner and get money, he gets summoned to the castle. With the urgent summon and no uniform, things get tricky.

== Cast ==
- Sture Lagerwall as Kammarjunkare Carl-Johan Stjärna
- Åke Söderblom as Frans, hans betjänt
- Aino Taube as Eva Linde
- Annalisa Ericson as Irene
- Julia Cæsar as Agneta Hermansson
- Hilding Gavle as Johan Elof Piraeus
- Magnus Kesster as Marcus
- Saga Sjöberg as Magda Palmborg
- Katie Rolfsen as Mrs. Palmborg
- Carl Hagman as Krusenhielm
- Tord Bernheim as Harry Ålund
- Olav Riégo as Chamberlain
- Carin Swensson as Maid
- Nils Dahlgren as Larsson
- Robert Ryberg as Policeman
- Charlie Almlöf as Waiter på Cecil
- Margit Andelius as Woman at the Boarding House
- Sven Arvor as Man i operapubliken
- Bertil Berglund as Hovmästare
- Elly Christiansson as Evas arbetskamrat
- Mary Gräber as Friherrinna
- Nils Nordståhl as Policeman
- Gunhild Olson as Fröken Svensson
- Olov Wigren as Bekant till Carl-Johan

== Bibliography ==
- Qvist, Per Olov & von Bagh, Peter. Guide to the Cinema of Sweden and Finland. Greenwood Publishing Group, 2000.
