= Katrina (1943 film) =

1943 film

- Directed by: Gustaf Edgren
- Written by: Gustaf Edgren; Oscar Rydqvist
- Based on: Katrina by Sally Salminen
- Produced by: Tor Borong; Harald Molander
- Starring: Märta Ekström; Frank Sundström; Hampe Faustman
- Cinematography: Julius Jaenzon
- Edited by: Oscar Rosander
- Music by: Gunnar Johansson
- Production company: Svensk Filmindustri
- Distributed by: Svensk Filmindustri
- Release date: 22 March 1943
- Running time: 102 minutes
- Country: Sweden
- Language: Swedish

Katrina is a 1943 Swedish drama film directed by Gustaf Edgren and starring Märta Ekström, Frank Sundström and Hampe Faustman. It was shot at the Råsunda Studios in Stockholm. The film's sets were designed by the art director Arne Åkermark. It is an adaptation of the 1936 novel Katrina by Sally Salminen.

== Cast ==
- Märta Ekström as Katrina
- Frank Sundström as Johan Johansson
- Hampe Faustman as Einar
- George Fant as Gustaf
- Birgit Tengroth as Saga Svensson
- Erik Berglund as Captain Nordquist
- Henrik Schildt as Captain August Ekvall
- Harry Ahlin as Andersson, sailor
- Elsa Ebbesen as Klara, Saga's housekeeper
- Greta Berthels as Beda
- Hugo Björne as Priest
- Linnéa Hillberg as Katrina's mother
- Anders Nyström as Herman
- Torsten Hillberg as Banker
- Margit Andelius as Woman in church
- Richard Lund as Pastor
- Bertil Berglund as First mate
- Bengt Brunskog as Man at the dance
- Julie Bernby as Prostitute at Berns
- Siri Olson as Prostitute at Berns
- Kotti Chave as Einar's friend
- Julia Cæsar as Woman in church
- Carl Deurell as Katrina's father
- Olav Riégo as Ekvall's accountant
- Nina Scenna as Ekvall's maid

== Bibliography ==
- Goble, Alan. The Complete Index to Literary Sources in Film. Walter de Gruyter, 1999.
