= The Rivals (1926 film) =

1926 film

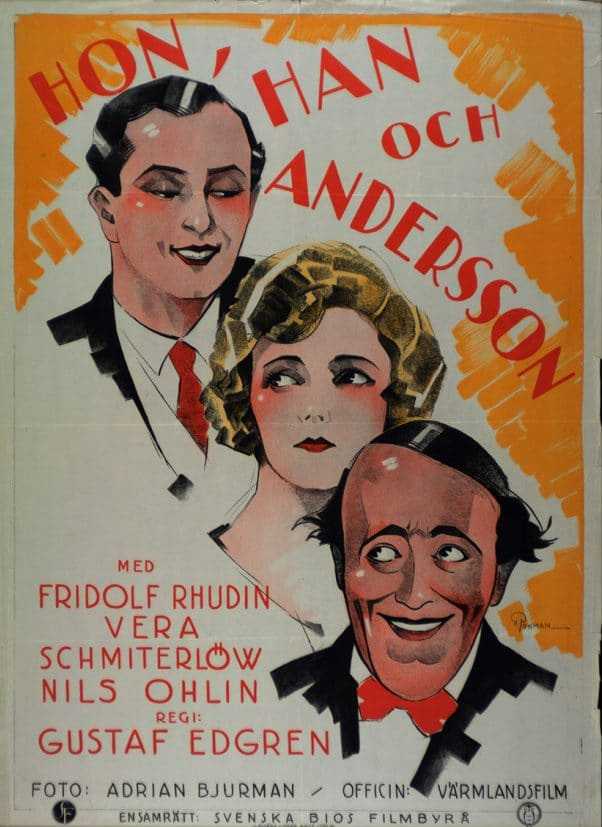
- Directed by: Gustaf Edgren
- Written by: Sölve Cederstrand; Gustaf Edgren
- Produced by: Gustaf Edgren
- Starring: Vera Schmiterlöw; Nils Ohlin; Fridolf Rhudin
- Cinematography: Adrian Bjurman
- Edited by: Adrian Bjurman
- Production company: Värmlandsfilm
- Distributed by: Svenska Biografteaterns Filmbyrå
- Release date: 4 October 1926
- Running time: 94 minutes
- Country: Sweden
- Languages: Silent; Swedish intertitles

The Rivals or She, He and Andersson (Swedish: Hon, han och Andersson) is a 1926 Swedish comedy film directed by Gustaf Edgren and starring Vera Schmiterlöw, Nils Ohlin and Fridolf Rhudin. It was shot at the Råsunda Studios in Stockholm. The film's sets were designed by the art director Vilhelm Bryde.

== Cast ==
- Vera Schmiterlöw as Maud
- Nils Ohlin as Harry Bergfeldt
- Fridolf Rhudin as Emil Andersson
- Edit Ernholm as Augusta
- Sture Baude as Sven Rinkow
- Mona Geijer-Falkner as Nea Rinkow
- Georg Blomstedt as Patrik Johansson
- Mathias Taube as Claes Gadd
- Erik Johansson as Actor
- Carl-Gunnar Wingård as Actor
- Wictor Hagman as Gentleman
- Hugo Lundström as Johan

== Bibliography ==
- Gustafsson, Tommy. Masculinity in the Golden Age of Swedish Cinema: A Cultural Analysis of 1920s Films. McFarland, 2014.
