= Bullens pilsnerkorv =

Swedish sausage product

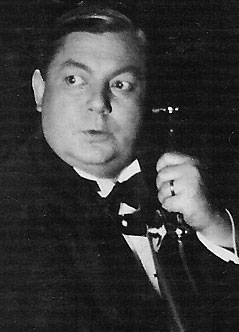
- Actor Erik "Bullen" Berglund which lent his name.
- Type: Canned sausage
- Course: Main or snack
- Place of origin: Sweden
- Created by: Alvesta butchery association; Erik "Bullen" Berglund
- Invented: 1953
- Main ingredients: Beef and pork
- Variations: Bullens pilsnerkorv; Bullens varmkorv
- Food energy (per 100 g serving): 190 kcal (790 kJ)
Nutritional value
(per 100 g serving)
- Protein: 12 g
- Fat: 14 g
- Carbohydrate: 5.5 g

Bullens Pilsnerkorv (English: Bullen's pilsner sausage) is a canned Swedish sausage product named after the actor Erik "Bullen" Berglund. It was first launched in 1953 in response to the Alvesta Epidemic, a salmonella outbreak. It was headlined as guaranteed salmonella-free and during the 1950s was one of many tinned goods under Bullen's name. Today it is manufactured by Scan, and despite the name has never contained pilsner.

== History ==
=== Background ===
The first Pilsnerkorv sausages were produced by Alvesta butchery association in 1953. The launch was preceded by a large nationwide salmonella outbreak that originated in Alvesta's butchery. In total 9 000 people became infected and 90 people died during the epidemic.

As a consequence of the epidemic outbreak skeptical consumers stayed away from meat products for some time to come, especially those with "Alvesta" on the label. This new sausage product would thus be a way to sell in a guaranteed salmonella-free fully sterilized tinned goods, with the help of a famous movie star.

=== Launch ===
The actor Erik "Bullen" Berglund, who had a side career as cookbook author, lent his name and face to the new product. He was an established pilsnerfilm actor, a type of 1930s comedy which often included elements of paltry comics about drinking pilsner and other alcoholic beverages, which led to the product's name.

Erik "Bullen" Berglund did also help with the recipe for the canned sausage. During the 1950s, over thirty products were released under the "Bullens" label, including pigs' feet and dill meat.

=== Later years ===
Of all the meat products under Bullen's name, only these canned sausages remain into the 21st century. They are marketed under two names:

- Bullens pilsnerkorv [Bullen's pilsner sausage], with 8 sausages in a can.
- Bullens varmkorv [Bullen's hot-dogs], with 40 somewhat longer sausages in a larger can.

Today (2016) Bullens Pilsnerkorv is produced by Scan. The recipe, design, and the packaging remain the same today as it was when launched. The label is yellow and black, with the text "Bullens" and two sausages in an irregular red colour.

== Content and preparation ==
The already-boiled sausages are packed in a can of their own stock. The recipe does not include pilsner, but the name is instead based to "pilsnerfilm", a type of comedy that was popular in the 1930s that often revolved around drinking beer.

The sausages should be heated slowly in their own stock so as not to crack, with some whole allspice corns and a bay leaf. Erik "Bullen" Berglund's own serving recommendation was to put the sausage and a bay leaf on crispbread, and then top it with your favorite mustard.
