= Carl-Gunnar Wingård =

Swedish actor (1894–1977)

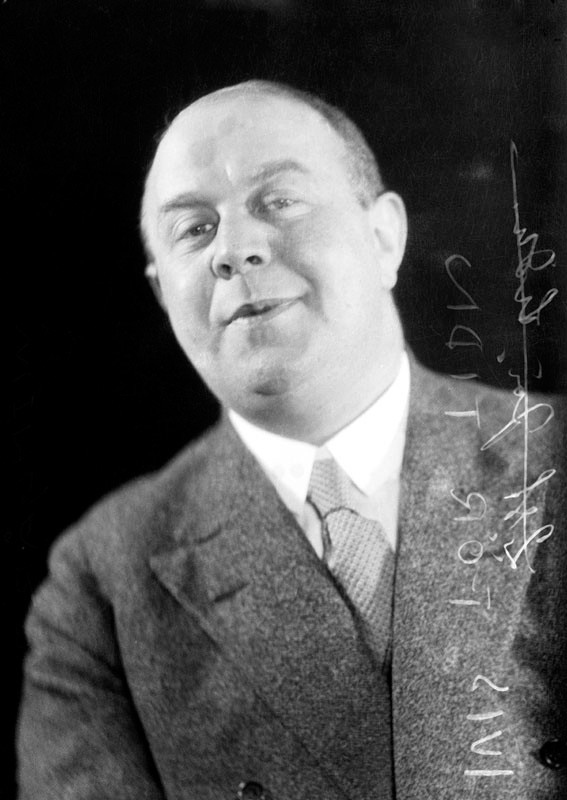
- Born: 27 February 1894; Karlskrona, Sweden
- Died: 20 January 1977 (aged 82); Bromma, Stockholm, Sweden
- Occupation: Actor
- Years active: 1919–1966

Carl-Gunnar Wingård (27 February 1894 – 20 January 1977) was a Swedish actor. He appeared in 90 films between 1919 and 1966.

== Selected filmography ==
- Andersson's Kalle (1922)
- New Pranks of Andersson's Kalle (1923)
- Her Little Majesty (1925)
- The Rivals (1926)
- Kärlek och landstorm (1931)
- A Stolen Waltz (1932)
- Lucky Devils (1932)
- The Song to Her (1934)
- The Atlantic Adventure (1934)
- Adventure in Pyjamas (1935)
- Walpurgis Night (1935)
- Close Relations (1935)
- Shipwrecked Max (1936)
- Poor Millionaires (1936)
- Raggen (1936)
- Hotel Paradise (1937)
- Variety Is the Spice of Life (1939)
- Whalers (1939)
- The Bjorck Family (1940)
- Lucky Young Lady (1941)
- How to Tame a Real Man (1941)
- The Ghost Reporter (1941)
- Fransson the Terrible (1941)
- We House Slaves (1942)
- She Thought It Was Him (1943)
- Mister Collins' Adventure (1943)
- I Am Fire and Air (1944)
- The Emperor of Portugallia (1944)
- Blood and Fire (1945)
- Poor Little Sven (1947)
- Sköna Helena (1951) - Calchas
- One Fiancée at a Time (1952)
- Speed Fever (1953)
- The Glass Mountain (1953)
- Getting Married (1955)
- Woman in a Fur Coat (1958)
- Only a Waiter (1959)
- Good Friends and Faithful Neighbours (1960)
