= Katie Rolfsen =

Norwegian actress (1902–1966)

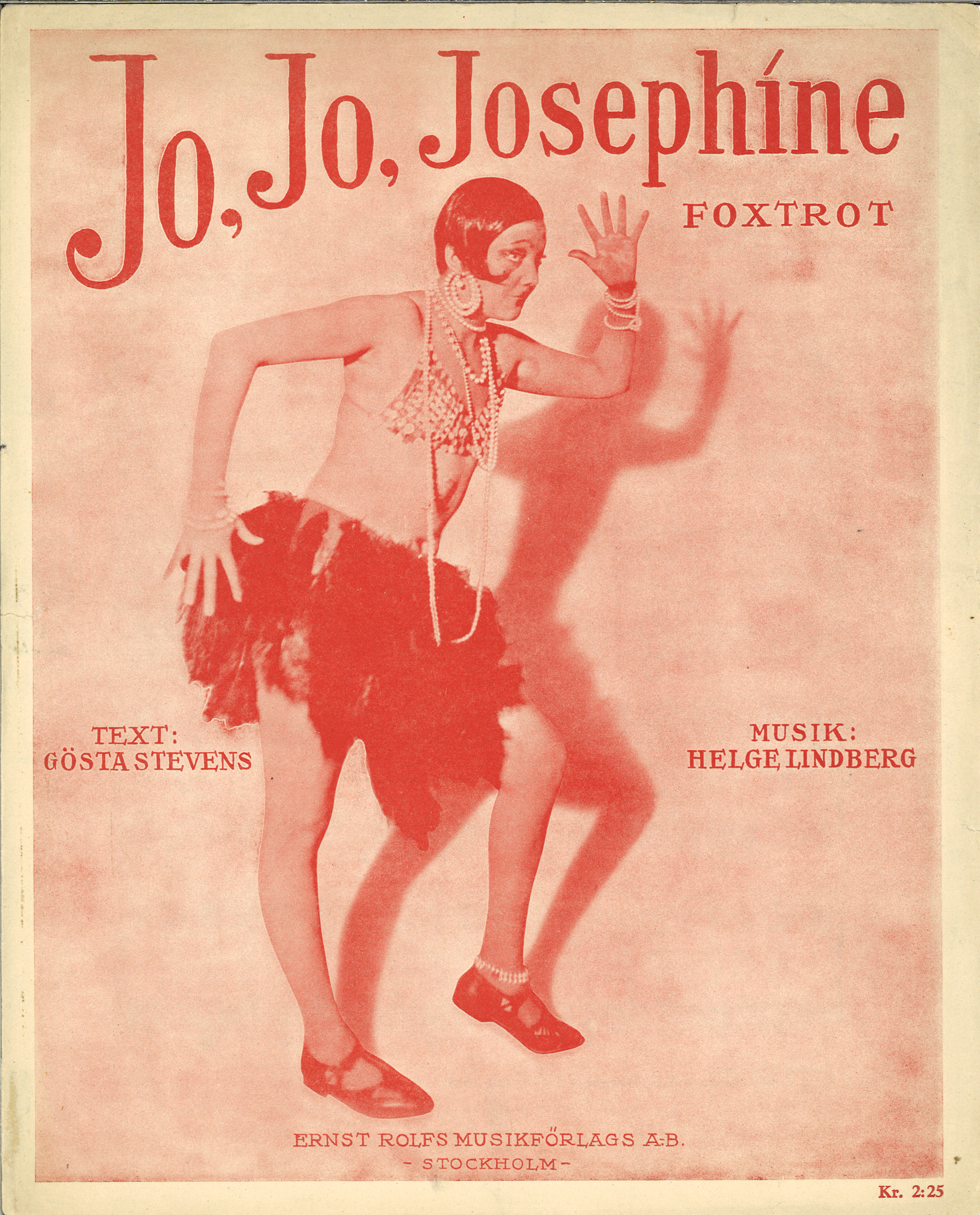
- Rolfsen, in a 1928 sheetmusic cover
- Born: Hanna Katarina Rolfsen; 10 November 1902; Oslo, Norway
- Died: 22 September 1966 (aged 63); Rådmansö, Sweden
- Occupation: Actress
- Years active: 1925–1965

Katie Rolfsen (10 November 1902 – 22 September 1966) was a Norwegian-Swedish film actress. She appeared in 25 films between 1925 and 1965. She was born in Oslo, Norway, and died in Rådmansö, Sweden.

== Selected filmography ==
- Himmeluret (1925)
- Black Rudolf (1928)
- Colourful Pages (1931)
- The Women Around Larsson (1934)
- 65, 66 and I (1936)
- Russian Flu (1937)
- Oh, Such a Night! (1937)
- Julia jubilerar (1938)
- Just a Bugler (1938)
- His Majesty Must Wait (1945)
- Sju svarta be-hå (1954)
- Congress in Seville (1955)
- Docking the Boat (1965)
