= 40 Skipper Street =

Lost 1925 Swedish silent drama film

- Directed by: Gustaf Edgren
- Written by: Sölve Cederstrand; Gustaf Edgren
- Produced by: Gustaf Edgren
- Starring: Einar Hanson; Mona Mårtenson; Magda Holm
- Cinematography: Carl-Axel Söderström
- Edited by: Gustaf Edgren
- Production company: Värmlandsfilm
- Distributed by: AB Skandias Filmbyrå
- Release date: 5 January 1925
- Running time: 70 minutes
- Country: Sweden
- Languages: Silent; Swedish intertitles

40 Skipper Street (Swedish: Skeppargatan 40) is a 1925 Swedish silent drama film directed by Gustaf Edgren and starring Einar Hanson, Mona Mårtenson and Magda Holm. It was shot at the Råsunda Studios in Stockholm. The film's sets were designed by the art director Vilhelm Bryde.

The film is based on Algot Sandberg's play Skeppargatan 40, which was first performed in 1909 and published as a novel in 1913.

The film is presumed to be lost.

== Interesting facts ==
The title of the film is a real street address (40 Skipper Street) in both Stockholm and in Norrköping in Sweden.

== Cast ==
- Einar Hanson as Erhard Malm, tutor
- Mona Mårtenson as Ruth Frendin, a daughter
- Vilhelm Bryde as Lt. Gustaf Ek
- Magda Holm as Erika Blom
- Hulda Malmström as Mrs. Blom
- Edit Ernholm as Lovisa
- Gösta Alexandersson as Tom
- Albert Christiernsson as Tore Frendin, the Son
- Einar Fagstad as Seeman
- Ernst Fastbom as Tidlund
- Alfred Lundberg as Consul Frendin
- Henning Ohlsson as Andreas Persson
- Karin Swanström as Mrs. Frendin

== Bibliography ==
- Qvist, Per Olov & von Bagh, Peter. Guide to the Cinema of Sweden and Finland. Greenwood Publishing Group, 2000.
