= Little Napoleon (film) =

1943 film

- Directed by: Gustaf Edgren
- Written by: Paul Sarauw (play); Gardar Sahlberg; Gustaf Edgren
- Produced by: Arthur Spjuth
- Starring: Åke Söderblom; Annalisa Ericson; Marianne Löfgren
- Cinematography: Martin Bodin
- Edited by: Oscar Rosander
- Music by: Gunnar Johansson
- Production company: Wivefilm
- Distributed by: Wivefilm
- Release date: 31 May 1943
- Running time: 96 minutes
- Country: Sweden
- Language: Swedish

Little Napoleon (Swedish: Lille Napoleon) is a 1943 Swedish comedy film directed by Gustaf Edgren and starring Åke Söderblom, Annalisa Ericson and Marianne Löfgren. It was shot at the Råsunda Studios in Stockholm. The film's sets were designed by the art director Nils Svenwall.

== Synopsis ==
Lars is an insignificant office worker but one day is launched on a wave of success consequent to his sacking.

== Cast ==
- Åke Söderblom as Lars Napoleon Larsson
- Annalisa Ericson as Lisa Larsson
- Erik Berglund as Konrad Klint
- Marianne Löfgren as Mrs. Klint
- Georg Funkquist as Lundkvist
- Gull Natorp as Aunt Anna
- Barbro Flodquist as Miss Mårtensson
- Thor Modéen as Staff Sergeant
- John Botvid as Strömberg
- Axel Högel as Blomkvist
- Carl Deurell as Selander
- Torsten Hillberg as Mellberg
- Kaj Hjelm as Kajan
- Julia Cæsar as Östermalm Lady
- Margit Andelius as Miss Jönsson
- Naemi Briese as Woman at the Party
- Anna-Lisa Baude as Woman at the Party

== Bibliography ==
- Qvist, Per Olov & von Bagh, Peter. Guide to the Cinema of Sweden and Finland. Greenwood Publishing Group, 2000.
