= With Open Arms (1940 film) =

1940 film

- Directed by: Gustaf Edgren
- Written by: Gösta Gustaf-Janson (novel); Oscar Hemberg; Gustaf Edgren
- Starring: Sigurd Wallén; Signe Hasso; Olof Molander
- Cinematography: Julius Jaenzon
- Edited by: Oscar Rosander
- Music by: Gunnar Johansson
- Production company: Svensk Filmindustri
- Distributed by: Svensk Filmindustri
- Release date: 13 August 1940
- Running time: 95 minutes
- Country: Sweden
- Language: Swedish

With Open Arms (Swedish: Stora famnen) is a 1940 Swedish comedy film directed and co-written by Gustaf Edgren and starring Sigurd Wallén, Signe Hasso and Olof Molander . The film's sets were designed by the art director Arne Åkermark.

== Cast ==
- Sigurd Wallén as K. A. Koger
- Signe Hasso as Eva Richert
- Olof Molander as Henning Koger
- Erik 'Bullen' Berglund as Magnus Koger
- Hjördis Petterson as Fanny Koger
- Britt-Lis Edgren as Ulla Koger
- Håkan Westergren as Jack Blom
- Allan Bohlin as Bertil Hansson
- Gerda Lundequist as Karolina Koger
- Marianne Löfgren as Märta Blom
- Siri Olson as Aina Blom
- Kotti Chave as Acke Blom
- John Norrman as Blom
- Eric Abrahamsson as Lundin
- Åke Ohberg as Ivar Bergström
- Bror Bügler as Sven Lindgren
- Viran Rydkvist as Amalia
- Wiktor Andersson as Gardener
- Carl Deurell as Janitor
- Douglas Håge as Gentleman
- Gunnar Sjöberg as Lawyer
- Nils Jacobsson as Assistant
- Peter Lindgren as Student
- Richard Lund as Doctor
- Gaby Stenberg as Sales woman
- Lill-Tollie Zellman as Daisy

== Bibliography ==
- Qvist, Per Olov & von Bagh, Peter. Guide to the Cinema of Sweden and Finland. Greenwood Publishing Group, 2000.
