= Bright Prospects =

1941 film

- Directed by: Gustaf Molander
- Written by: Gösta Stevens; Gustaf Molander
- Starring: Signe Hasso; Ernst Eklund; Erik 'Bullen' Berglund
- Cinematography: Julius Jaenzon
- Edited by: Oscar Rosander
- Music by: Gunnar Johansson
- Production company: Svensk Filmindustri
- Release date: 10 February 1941
- Running time: 92 minutes
- Country: Sweden
- Language: Swedish

Bright Prospects (Swedish:Den ljusnande framtid) is a 1941 Swedish drama film co-written and directed by Gustaf Molander and starring Signe Hasso, Ernst Eklund and Erik 'Bullen' Berglund. The film's art direction was by Arne Åkermark.

The film is about a small town school's new teacher, who falls in love with the school principal, a widower. They begin a relationship, but things become complicated.

== Cast ==
- Signe Hasso as Birgit Norén
- Ernst Eklund as Helge Dahlberg
- Erik 'Bullen' Berglund as Gurkan Olsson
- Eric Abrahamsson as Norrman
- Alf Kjellin as Åke Dahlberg
- Rose-Mari Molander as Inga
- Eva Henning as Gun Ullman
- George Fant as Tage Lovander
- Karin Alexandersson as Maria
- Gull Natorp as Mrs. Norrman
- Ejnar Haglund as Edlund
- Carl Ström as Police Inspector Borgström
- Willy Peters as Borg
- John Botvid as Jansson
- Carl Deurell as Teacher
- Britta Larsson as Kerstin Linder
- John Norrman as Strömberg - The Porter
- Stig Olin as Bertil Bergström
- Hans Strååt as Student
- Sol-Britt Agerup as Schoolgirl
- Astrid Bodin as Emma - Olsson's Maid
- Elly Christiansson as Lady at Dinner
- Iris Dalunde as Schoolgirl
- Tom Ekelund as Sven
- Hortensia Hedström as Teacher's Wife
- Karin Nordgren as Schoolgirl
- Nina Scenna as Waitress
- Victor Thorén as School Caretaker
- Eric von Gegerfelt as Guest at Dinner
- Susanna Östberg as Dancing Girl

== Bibliography ==
- Mariah Larsson & Anders Marklund. Swedish Film: An Introduction and Reader. Nordic Academic Press, 2010.
