= The Swedish Horseman =

1949 film

- Directed by: Gustaf Edgren
- Written by: Paul Baudisch; Gustaf Edgren
- Based on: The Swedish Rider by Leo Perutz
- Starring: Elisabeth Söderström; Kenne Fant; Åke Söderblom
- Cinematography: Åke Dahlqvist
- Edited by: Lennart Wallén
- Music by: Bertil Bokstedt
- Production company: Kungsfilm
- Distributed by: Kungsfilm
- Release date: 26 September 1949
- Running time: 88 minutes
- Country: Sweden
- Language: Swedish

The Swedish Horseman (Swedish: Svenske ryttaren) is a 1949 historical drama film directed by Gustaf Edgren and starring Elisabeth Söderström, Kenne Fant and Åke Söderblom. It was shot at the Råsunda Studios in Stockholm and on location in Uppsala and Torekov. It was inspired by Leo Perutz's 1936 novel The Swedish Rider.

== Cast ==
- Elisabeth Söderström as Agneta von Kreschwitz
- Kenne Fant as Jacob
- Åke Söderblom as Stenius
- Gunnel Broström as Svarta Lisa
- Harry Ahlin as Saltza
- Magnus Kesster as Bailiff
- Sture Ericson as Mickel
- Barbro Nordin as Margareta
- Tommy Blomquist as Karl
- Ingemar Pallin as Christian von Thornefeldt
- Wiktor Andersson as Cup-Bearer
- Tor Borong as Cavalry Captain
- Olle Ek as Servant
- Gull Natorp as Countess Gyllencrona
- Anna-Stina Wåglund as Kerstin

== Bibliography ==
- Qvist, Per Olov & Von Bagh, Peter . Guide to the Cinema of Sweden and Finland. Greenwood Publishing Group, 2000.
