= Styrman Karlssons flammor =

1938 Swedish film

- Directed by: Gustaf Edgren
- Written by: Oscar Rydqvist; Oscar Hemberg
- Based on: Sigge Strömberg's novels Styrman Karlssons flammor and Styrman Karlssons bröllopsresa
- Produced by: Stellan Claësson
- Starring: Anders Henrikson; Karin Swanström; Hjördis Petterson; Nanna Stenersen
- Cinematography: Martin Bodin; Erik Bergstrand
- Edited by: Oscar Rosander
- Music by: Eric Bengtson
- Distributed by: AB Svensk Filmindustri
- Release date: 1938
- Running time: 100 minutes
- Country: Sweden
- Language: Swedish

Styrman Karlssons flammor (First Mate Karlsson's Sweethearts) is a 1938 Swedish comedy film directed by Gustaf Edgren. The script was written by Oscar Rydqvist and Oscar Hemberg. It was based on Sigge Strömberg's novels Styrman Karlssons flammor and Styrman Karlssons bröllopsresa, which were published in 1918 and 1919. Edgren had earlier created a silent version of the film, also titled Styrman Karlssons flammor, in 1925. Three actors appeared in both films: Karin Swanström, Knut Lambert, and Nils Whiten. In Denmark, Annelise Reenberg created a Danish version of the same novels in 1958 called Styrmand Karlsen.

The Norwegian actress Nanna Stenersen played the role of Bessie Mathiesen, and another Norwegian actor, Alfred Maurstad, played a minor role as the smuggler Joe.

The film had its Swedish premiere at the Scandia theater in Stockholm on September 19, 1938.

== Plot ==
Kalle (Anders Henrikson) and his girlfriend Blenda (Marianne Löfgren) are on the way home from Tivoli amusement park in Stockholm when he tells her that he will be away for two years as a first mate on a sailing ship, but he swears his eternal fidelity to her. During the journey, the ship takes Bessie (Nanna Stenersen) on board because her vessel was wrecked. Will Kalle manage to resist the temptation of having a beautiful woman on board while Blenda is waiting for him at home?

== Cast ==
- Anders Henrikson as Kalle Karlsson, first mate on the Maria Albertina
- Karin Swanström as Mrs. Ragna Doring, widow at Stonebridge Castle
- Hjördis Petterson as Mrs. Margaret Mathiesen, née Lady Plumfield
- Nanna Stenersen as Bessie Mathiesen, her daughter, Mrs. Doring's niece
- Hilding Gavle as Cecil Alexander Burke, Lord of Baconshire, Middleton, and Yukonwich
- George Fant as William ("Bill"), Mrs. Doring's husband's nephew
- Ludde Gentzel as Ludvig "Ludde" Landegren, cockswain
- Erik "Bullen" Berglund as Sjögren, captain of the Maria Albertina
- David Erikson as the lawyer
- Margit Manstad as the woman in the hotel room
- Marianne Aminoff as Juanita
- Karin Albihn as Pamela Janitros, a Greek barmaid
- Karin Bergman-de Frey as a geisha
- Ulla Sorbon as the South Sea girl
- Judith Holmgren as the girl with the turban at the palisade
- Siri Olson as the girl on the street in London and guest at the inn
