= Carl Deurell =

Swedish Actor

- Deurell c.1906
- Born: 10 August 1868; Stockholm, Sweden
- Died: 9 December 1962 (aged 94); Bromma, Sweden
- Occupation: Actor
- Years active: 1923-1956 (film)

Carl Deurell (10 August 1868 – 9 December 1962) was a Swedish stage and film actor.

== Selected filmography ==
- Andersson, Pettersson och Lundström (1923)
- The Saga of Gosta Berling (1924)
- The Tales of Ensign Stål (1926)
- Tired Theodore (1931)
- A Night of Love by the Öresund (1931)
- The Österman Brothers' Virago (1932)
- Lucky Devils (1932)
- People of Hälsingland (1933)
- Simon of Backabo (1934)
- Walpurgis Night (1935)
- The Marriage Game (1935)
- Walpurgis Night (1935)
- The Girls of Uppakra (1936)
- Johan Ulfstjerna (1936)
- Conflict (1937)
- John Ericsson, Victor of Hampton Roads (1937)
- Her Little Majesty (1939)
- Wanted (1939)
- With Open Arms (1940)
- Life Goes On (1941)
- The Fight Continues (1941)
- Bright Prospects (1941)
- Sun Over Klara (1942)
- A Girl for Me (1943)
- She Thought It Was Him (1943)
- Little Napoleon (1943)
- Katrina (1943)
- The Emperor of Portugallia (1944)
- I Am Fire and Air (1944)
- Man's Woman (1945)
- The Happy Tailor (1945)
- Barnen från Frostmofjället (1945)
- The Journey Away (1945)
- The Serious Game (1945)
- Desire (1946)
- Kristin Commands (1946)
- Åsa-Hanna (1946)
- Maria (1947)
- Rail Workers (1947)
- Girl from the Mountain Village (1948)
- On These Shoulders (1948)
- Private Bom (1948)
- Two Stories Up (1950)
- Tarps Elin (1956)

== Bibliography ==
- Fromell, Axel. Stora Teatern i Göteborg 1893-1929: Nägra blad ur dess historia. A. Lindgren, 1929.
- Steene, Birgitta. Ingmar Bergman: A Guide to References and Resources. Amsterdam University Press, 2005. G.K. Hall, 1987
