= Lucky Devils (1932 film) =

1932 film

- Directed by: Ivar Johansson; Sigurd Wallén
- Written by: Teve Lundqvist; Sigurd Wallén; Fred Winter
- Produced by: Sten Njurling
- Starring: Sigurd Wallén; Erik Berglund; Maritta Marke; Tutta Rolf
- Cinematography: Åke Dahlqvist
- Edited by: Ivar Johansson
- Music by: Fred Winter
- Production company: Skandinavisk Produktion
- Distributed by: Svensk Filmindustri
- Release date: 26 December 1932
- Running time: 83 minutes
- Country: Sweden
- Language: Swedish

Lucky Devils (Swedish: Lyckans gullgossar) is a 1932 Swedish comedy film directed by Ivar Johansson and Sigurd Wallén and starring Wallén, Erik Berglund, Maritta Marke and Tutta Rolf. It was shot at the Råsunda Studios in Stockholm. The film's sets were designed by the art director Arne Åkermark.

== Synopsis ==
Two men encounter extreme good fortune when they find a lucky horseshoe in a Stockholm street.

== Cast ==
- Sigurd Wallén as Carl Erik Jansson / Carl Erik Silverberg
- Erik Berglund as Hugo Lundström / Hugo Guldén
- Maritta Marke as Lola del Prado
- Tutta Rolf as Dolores del Prado
- Eric Laurent as Richard Gordon
- Ragnar Widestedt as Herman Högmark
- Thor Modéen as Accountant with Cheeses
- Carl-Gunnar Wingård as Karl Hampus Blondin
- Jullan Jonsson as Tjohanna
- Helge Andersson as Decorator
- Tor Borong as Man in audience
- Göran Bratt as Boy
- Alice Carlsson as Girl at the ball
- Artur Cederborgh as Argentin
- Carl Deurell as Carl Gustaf Ekman
- Bertil Ehrenmark as Construction worker
- Georg Enders as Piano player
- Gösta Ericsson as Representative
- Sigge Fürst as Dinner guest
- Karl Gerhard as Tennis player
- Bengt-Olof Granberg as Dancer
- Karin Granberg as Dinner guest
- Wictor Hagman as Waitor
- Wilhelm Haqvinius as Customer in the barber shop
- Gunnar Johansson as Piano player
- Helge Kihlberg as Man in audience
- Olof Krook as Construction worker
- Herman Lantz as Worker
- Richard Lindström as Dr. Walther Müller
- Vera Nilsson as Daisy Korall
- Yngve Nyqvist as Alexei Slavoninsky
- Robert Ryberg as Dr. Fritz König
- Georg Skarstedt as Clerk

== Bibliography ==
- Qvist, Per Olov & von Bagh, Peter. Guide to the Cinema of Sweden and Finland. Greenwood Publishing Group, 2000.
