= Erik Berglund =

Swedish actor, director and writer (1887–1963)

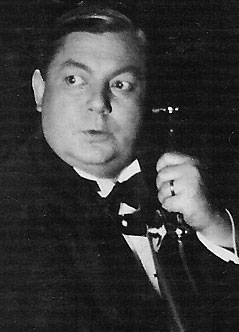
- Born: Karl Erik Berglund; 30 June 1887; Stockholm, Sweden
- Died: 27 April 1963 (aged 75); Stockholm, Sweden
- Occupations: Actor, director, food writer
- Years active: 1907–1962
- Spouses: Tora Jansson (1908–1910) Elsa Wickman (m. 1912–1963)

Karl Erik "Bullen" Berglund (30 June 1887 – 27 April 1963) was a Swedish actor, director and writer. Berglund was one of Sweden's most popular male actors in Swedish films from the 1930s to the 1950s. He appeared in more than a hundred films.

== Biography ==
Karl Erik Berglund was born at Lidingö in the Stockholm archipelago in Sweden. He was the son of Carl Victor Berglund and his wife Klara Erika Hausmetzger. In 1903 he was sent to in Paris to learn French. In 1905 he left to continue his studies in Berlin. Later that year he went to London to learn English.

He made his stage debut in 1907 with Albert Ranft (1858-1938) at the Östermalmsteatern and Södra Teatern theaters in Stockholm. From 1910 to 1912, he toured and from 1912 to 1913 he was employed at the Folkets hus in Stockholm. In 1913 he was hired by Axel Engdahl (1863–1922) to work at the Folkteatern in Gothenburg, where he performed until 1920. He then returned to Stockholm and was employed at Blancheteatern (1922–1923 and 1927–1929), at Vasateatern (1923–1925), at Blanche- och komediteatrarna (1925–1927) and from 1929 was employed by the Oscarsteatern.

He also had a food column, published some cookbooks and had his own radio show in the 1920s, also about cooking, using his nickname Bullen 'bun'. In Sweden there is a sausage named after him called Bullens pilsnerkorv. He had his cooking training in the 1920s in Paris, and worked in Hôtel Le Chapon Fin in Bordeaux and Claridge Hôtel in Paris.

== Selected filmography ==
- Sealed Lips (1927)
- Gustaf Wasa (1928)
- Sin (1928)
- For Her Sake (1930)
- The Doctor's Secret (1930)
- The Two of Us (1930)
- The Red Day (1931)
- The False Millionaire (1931)
- A Night of Love by the Öresund (1931)
- Mother-in-Law's Coming (1932)
- A Stolen Waltz (1932)
- Lucky Devils (1932)
- Wife for a Day (1933)
- Walpurgis Night (1935)
- Under False Flag (1935)
- Intermezzo (1936)
- He, She and the Money (1936)
- The Wedding Trip (1936)
- Johan Ulfstjerna (1936)
- The Family Secret (1936)
- Oh, Such a Night! (1937)
- Russian Flu (1937)
- Art for Art's Sake (1938)
- A Woman's Face (1938)
- Whalers (1939)
- Oh, What a Boy! (1939)
- Nothing But the Truth (1939)
- Only One Night (1939)
- With Open Arms (1940)
- Bright Prospects (1941)
- Only a Woman (1941)
- The Fight Continues (1941)
- The Ghost Reporter (1941)
- Tonight or Never (1941)
- Landstormens lilla argbigga (1941)
- Ride Tonight! (1942)
- Little Napoleon (1943)
- Katrina (1943)
- Kungajakt (1944)
- Prince Gustaf (1944)
- The Forest Is Our Heritage (1944)
- Oss tjuvar emellan eller En burk ananas (1945)
- Sussie (1945)
- Man's Woman (1945)
- Idel ädel adel (1945)
- Interlude (1946)
- Peggy on a Spree (1946)
- Incorrigible (1946)
- Dynamite (1947)
- The Girl from the Marsh Croft (1947)
- A Swedish Tiger (1948)
- Loffe the Tramp (1948)
- Flickan från tredje raden (1949)
- Blondie, Beef and the Banana (1952)
- The Girl from Backafall (1953)
- The Beat of Wings in the Night (1953)
- Speed Fever (1953)
- Hidden in the Fog (1953)
- All the World's Delights (1953)
- Darling of Mine (1955)
- Ratataa (1956)
- The Song of the Scarlet Flower (1956)
- The Girl in Tails (1956)
- Moon Over Hellesta (1956)
