= Eric Bengtson =

Swedish composer

- Born: 31 July 1897; Norra Vram, Skåne län, Sweden
- Died: 6 April 1948 (aged 50); Sweden
- Occupation: Composer
- Years active: 1930–1944 (film)

Eric Bengtson (31 July 1897 – 6 April 1948) was a Swedish composer who worked on many film scores. In 1938 he composed the music for the Ingrid Bergman film A Woman's Face (1938).

== Selected filmography ==
- Cavaliers of the Crown (1930)
- Frida's Songs (1930)
- The Red Day (1931)
- Colourful Pages (1931)
- Servant's Entrance (1932)
- Love and Deficit (1932)
- People of Hälsingland (1933)
- Two Men and a Widow (1933)
- Boman's Boy (1933)
- Simon of Backabo (1934)
- Andersson's Kalle (1934)
- Fired (1934)
- Walpurgis Night (1935)
- Ocean Breakers (1935)
- Johan Ulfstjerna (1936)
- It Pays to Advertise (1936)
- The Family Secret (1936)
- Russian Flu (1937)
- John Ericsson, Victor of Hampton Roads (1937)
- Conflict (1937)
- Hotel Paradise (1937)
- Thunder and Lightning (1938)
- A Woman's Face (1938)
- Art for Art's Sake (1938)
- Dollar (1938)
- The Great Love (1938)
- Styrman Karlssons flammor (1938)
- Only One Night (1939)
- I Am Fire and Air (1944)

== Bibliography ==
- Soila, Tytti. The Cinema of Scandinavia. Wallflower Press, 2005.
