= First Mate Karlsson's Sweethearts (1925 film) =

1925 film

- Directed by: Gustaf Edgren
- Written by: Sigge Strömberg (novel); Sölve Cederstrand; Gustaf Edgren
- Produced by: Gustaf Edgren
- Starring: Ernst Rolf; Vera Schmiterlöw; Fridolf Rhudin
- Cinematography: Henrik Jaenzon
- Production company: Värmlandsfilm
- Distributed by: Svenska Biografteaterns Filmbyrå
- Release date: 26 October 1925
- Running time: 114 minutes
- Country: Sweden
- Languages: Silent; Swedish intertitles

First Mate Karlsson's Sweethearts (Swedish: Styrman Karlssons flammor) is a 1925 Swedish silent comedy film directed by Gustaf Edgren and starring Ernst Rolf, Vera Schmiterlöw and Fridolf Rhudin. It was shot at the Råsunda Studios in Stockholm. The film's sets were designed by the art director Vilhelm Bryde.

As of 2023, there were two incomplete acetate prints held by the Swedish Film Institute.

== Cast ==
- Ernst Rolf as Karl Alfred Karlsson
- Vera Schmiterlöw as Bessie
- Fridolf Rhudin as Augustsson
- Edit Ernholm as Blenda
- Mignon Georgian as Nanette
- Yvonne Lesti as Naoma
- Guye Rolf as Beatrice
- Mathias Taube as Sjögren
- Karin Swanström as Bessie Doring
- Stellan Claësson as Benson
- Wictor Hagman as John Bernertz
- Axel Hultman as Inn Keeper

== Bibliography ==
- Gustafsson, Tommy. Masculinity in the Golden Age of Swedish Cinema: A Cultural Analysis of 1920s Films. McFarland, 2014.
