= Åke Söderblom =

Swedish screenwriter

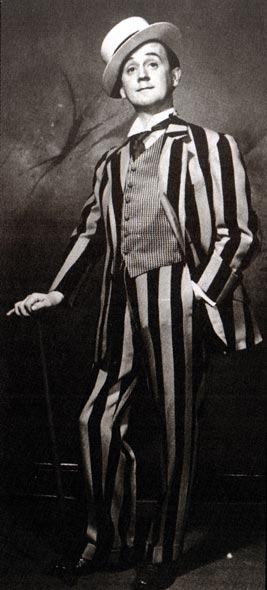
- Born: 20 January 1910; Fritsla, Sweden
- Died: 22 May 1965 (aged 55); Gothenburg, Sweden
- Occupation: Actor
- Years active: 1933–1965
- Children: Lena
- Relatives: Gunnar Fischer (brother-in-law)

Åke Fridolf Söderblom (20 January 1910 – 22 May 1965) was a Swedish actor, screenwriter and songwriter (one of his songs is Kan du vissla Johanna?). He appeared in 70 films between 1933 and 1965.

== Selected filmography ==
- The Dangerous Game (1933)
- Two Men and a Widow (1933)
- Eva Goes Aboard (1934)
- It Pays to Advertise (1936)
- Unfriendly Relations (1936)
- Russian Flu (1937)
- Klart till drabbning (1937)
- Oh, Such a Night! (1937)
- Thunder and Lightning (1938)
- Julia jubilerar (1938)
- Nothing But the Truth (1939)
- Kiss Her! (1940)
- The Crazy Family (1940)
- Fröken Vildkatt (1941)
- We're All Errand Boys (1941)
- Poor Ferdinand (1941)
- The Ghost Reporter (1941)
- Tonight or Never (1941)
- Löjtnantshjärtan (1942)
- Little Napoleon (1943)
- Lilla helgonet (1944)
- His Majesty Must Wait (1945)
- Flottans kavaljerer (1948)
- Vi flyr på Rio (1949)
- The Swedish Horseman (1949)
- The Motor Cavaliers (1950)
- Knockout at the Breakfast Club (1950)
- Sköna Helena (1951)
- Beef and the Banana (1951)
- My Friend Oscar (1951)
- Blondie, Beef and the Banana (1952)
- Flicka i kasern (1955)
- The Koster Waltz (1958)
- Sailors (1964)
- Här kommer bärsärkarna (1965)
