= Gustaf Edgren =

Swedish film director (1895–1954)

Erik Gustaf Edgren
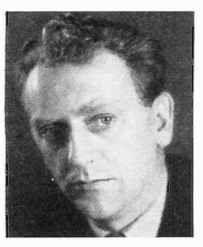
- Gustaf Edgren
- Born: Erik Gustaf Edgren; April 1, 1895; Östra Fågelvik, Karlstad, Värmland; 59.4182°N 13.7332°E
- Died: June 10, 1954 (aged 59); Bromma, Stockholm, Sweden
- Resting place: Nya kyrkogården, Kristinehamn, Värmland; 59.3050°N 14.0811°E
- Occupations: film director; screenwriter; film producer; choreographer
- Years active: 1921–1951
- Spouses: Svea Hellberg (1924–1924); Linnéa Spångberg (1927–1954)
- Children: 3

Gustaf Edgren (1 April 1895 – 10 June 1954) was a prominent Swedish film director, screenwriter, and producer who played a significant role in the development of Swedish cinema during the first half of the 20th century. His extensive filmography across multiple roles – totaling over 80 film credits – spans silent films to talkies and comedies to dramas.

== Early life and family ==
Erik Gustaf Edgren was born on 1 April 1895 in Östra Fågelvik, Värmland County, Sweden.

His parents were Karl August Edgren (1873–1923), a laborer (arbetare), tenant farmer (arrendator), and later a carter (åkare), and Elin Sofia Danielsson (1871–1943). Around 1911 the family relocated to nearby Kristinehamn. His siblings were Nils Gerhard (1901–1978), an editor and writer; (Note: Nils Gerhard Edgren co-wrote the Swedish adventurer Edgar P. Andersson's French Foreign Legion memoirs 40° resfeber (1933) and Fångar i öknens inferno (1934) for Bonniers.) Signe Maria (1905–1984), a seamstress; and Ingrid Hilma Sofia (1911–1997), a dental assistant. Another sibling, Karl August Gunnar (1903–1904), died in infancy.

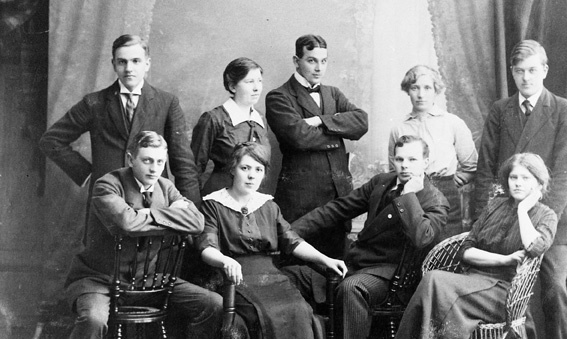
Edgren (seated, far left) with Kristinehamns Amatörsällskap (local drama club), 1918

He attended a local trade school (handelsskola), worked at the Uddeholm ironworks, and traveled abroad in Germany, England, France, and Italy. He led both the Brage Folkdansgille (Brage Folk Dance Club) in Kristinehamn and Kristinehamns Amatörsällskap (the local amateur drama society), and drew on both for the actors and performers in his early films. From 1920 to 1922 he worked as a reporter for Nya Wermlands-Tidningen, during which time he began his film career.

Edgren's first marriage was to Svea Eleonora Hellberg (1896–1924) of Sundsvall, daughter of Elin Ringqvist (1868-1950) and charcuterie merchant Emil Gunnar Hellberg (1868–1901). The couple announced their engagement in May 1921, when Svea was a shop assistant in Sundsvall and Gustaf was working as an office manager in Kristinehamn. They were married in Kristinehamn on 16 February 1924. Svea, who had been seriously ill for some time, died there thirty-eight days later, on 26 March 1924, at the age of 27.

In a civil ceremony on 29 September 1927, Edgren married actress Linnéa Spångberg (1904–1981) of Ludvika, with whom he remained until his death in 1954. Linnéa was the daughter of Anna Lovisa Spångberg (1870–1916), who died when Linnéa was 12, and Anders Gustaf Olsson. She was the half-sister of Riksdag member August Spångberg. Gustaf and Linnéa's three children—Britt-Lis, Bengt, and Björn—were all child film actors, and Linnéa herself appeared in several of Gustaf's films, most notably as Brita in his 1932 Värmlänningarna.

== Career ==
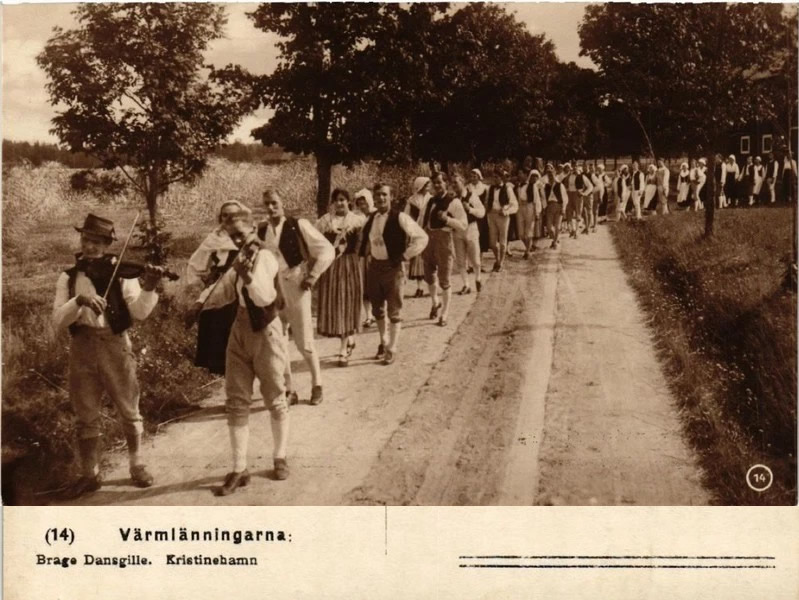
Brage Folkdansgille (Brage Folk Dance Club) in 1921 film Värmlänningarna

=== Värmlandsfilm ===
Gustaf Edgren made his film debut in 1921 as a choreographer in the film Värmlänningarna, directed by Erik A. Petschler, in which he also appeared in a minor role. Edgren led his folk dance ensemble in traditional dances during the midsummer celebration scenes. Critics noted that these dance sequences were particularly memorable and received generous screen time.

In 1922, he made his directorial debut with Fröken på Björneborg, a film for which he was also responsible for the screenplay and production. He made six films in Kristinehamn for his own company Värmlandsfilm before joining Svensk Filmindustri.

In late 1926, between his Värmlandsfilm productions and his move to Svensk Filmindustri, Edgren directed a touring stage revue, Skärgårdsflirt på vift ("Skärgårdsflirt on the Road"), based on the popular Stockholm revue Skärgårdsflirt that had been a hit at the Mosebacke variety theatre. The tour premiered in Jönköping on New Year's Eve 1926 and starred Fridolf Rhudin, reprising the comic role he had played in the original Stockholm production. Linnéa Spångberg, the future Mrs. Edgren, made her stage debut in the cast.

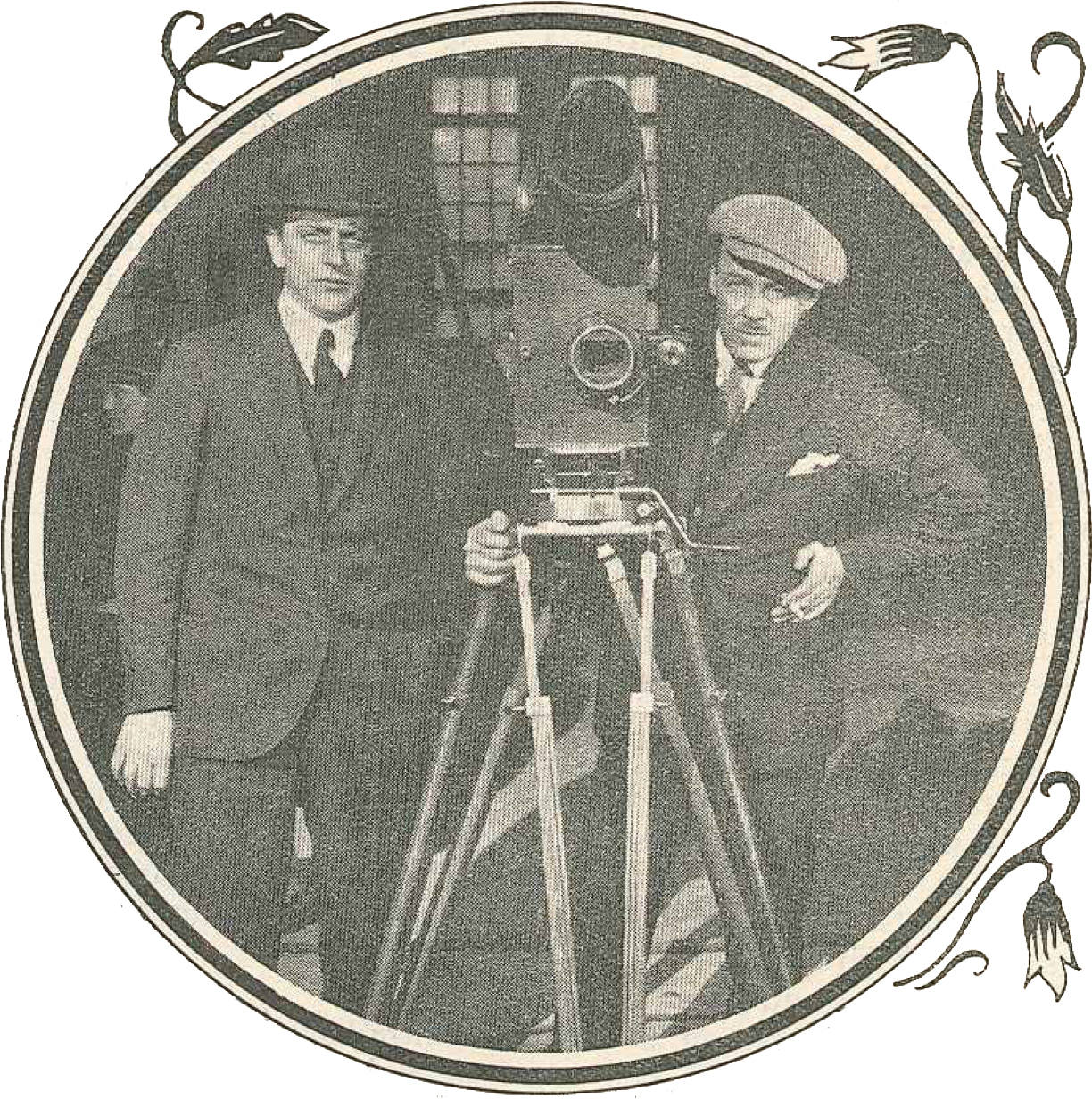
Edgren (left) with cinematographer Hugo Edlund in 1928

=== Svensk Filmindustri ===
In 1927, Edgren joined Svensk Filmindustri (SF), where he became the company's most profitable director over two decades. A significant part of his early success was his discovery and promotion of comedian Fridolf Rhudin. His films between 1927 and 1934 were particularly successful, with Rhudin featured in six films from The Ghost Baron (1927) to Simon of Backabo (1934). Edgren successfully navigated the challenging transition from silent to sound film during this period, when many Swedish filmmakers struggled with the new technology, helping Svensk Filmindustri maintain its commercial viability when the studio had considered halting production entirely in the late 1920s. During this critical period for Swedish cinema, as Leif Furhammar notes, the advent of sound film technology "provided the vehicle for the commercial renaissance [of] Swedish film" after a period when "not a single Swedish film was in production" for nine months in 1929.

=== Filmography overview ===
Gustaf Edgren had a special affinity for folklustspel (Swedish rural comedies). This was evident in his debut film and continued with works like the 1932 remake of Värmlänningarna. He also explored political themes, directing Erik Lindorm's political comedy The Red Day (1931) and Karl Fredrik regerar (1934), a film about a farmhand who becomes the Minister of Agriculture. Edgren's prolific career spanned multiple facets of Swedish filmmaking: he directed 32 films and wrote 22 screenplays (1922-1951), produced 6 early films (1922-1926), and contributed 2 story/scenario works. His versatility extended to occasional acting (3 films), film editing (2 films), choreography (1 film), production management (2 films), and even songwriting (13 lyrics for Sköna Helena). This comprehensive involvement demonstrates a filmmaker who mastered nearly every aspect of cinema during three critical decades of the medium's development in Sweden.

=== Notable films ===
Among Gustaf Edgren's extensive filmography, several works stand out for their historical significance, critical reception, or cultural impact. Among his most notable works as a director are:

==== Walpurgis Night (1935) ====
Walpurgis Night (Valborgsmässoafton) is a 1935 Swedish drama featuring performances by Lars Hanson, Karin Kavli, Victor Sjöström, and a young Ingrid Bergman. The film delves into themes of love, societal expectations, abortion, conflicting views of the roles of women, and the complexities of human relationships. The context of the story is concern about the declining birth rate in Sweden during the 1930s.

==== John Ericsson, Victor of Hampton Roads (1937) ====
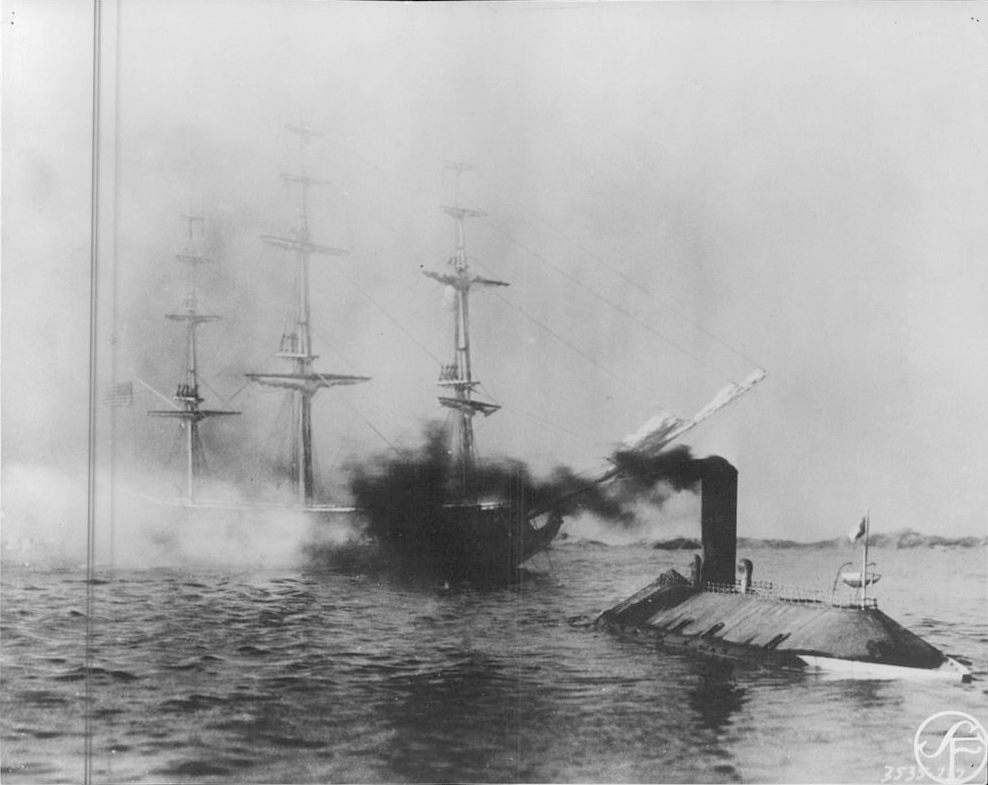
A scene from the film John Ericsson – the Victor of Hampton Roads.

John Ericsson, Victor of Hampton Roads (John Ericsson – segraren vid Hampton Roads) is a 1937 Swedish historical drama depicting the life of Swedish-American inventor John Ericsson. The film centers on Ericsson's development of the ironclad warship USS Monitor and its pivotal role in the 1862 Battle of Hampton Roads during the American Civil War. Victor Sjöström portrayed Ericsson, and the score was composed by Eric Bengtson. The film was part of a broader cultural initiative to celebrate Swedish contributions abroad and was especially targeted toward Swedish-American audiences during the 1938 tercentenary celebrations of Swedish immigration to the United States. Screenings were held in communities such as South Bend, Indiana, and the film was praised as a tribute to Swedish ingenuity and perseverance.

==== Sunshine Follows Rain (1946) ====
Sunshine Follows Rain (Driver dagg, faller regn) is a 1946 romantic drama based on the novel by Margit Söderholm. Söderholm's novel won a competition in 1943 organized by the magazine Hemmets Journal, publisher Wahlström & Widstrand, and Svensk Filmindustri, with Edgren serving on the jury. Edgren was immediately enthusiastic about the story's film potential, but faced resistance from SF's head Carl-Anders Dymling, who was unimpressed with the rural genre. The project was delayed for three years before finally being produced through SF's subsidiary Fribergs Filmbyrå rather than the main studio.

The film portrays a love story set against the backdrop of 19th-century Swedish rural life in Hälsingland, highlighting themes of tradition, love, and societal norms through the romance between farmer's daughter Marit (Mai Zetterling) and outcast fiddler Jon (Alf Kjellin). It became a historic commercial triumph, earning 1.6 million kronor and becoming the first SF sound film to surpass one million kronor in revenue. Film researcher Per Olov Qvist estimates the film attracted approximately two million cinema visitors, placing it among the most-watched Swedish films of all time. The success proved the commercial viability of Swedish rural stories and helped launch a new wave of folklustspel productions.

==== The Girl from the Marsh Croft (1947) ====
The Girl from the Marsh Croft (Tösen från Stormyrtorpet) is a 1947 adaptation of Selma Lagerlöf's novella. The film tells the story of a young woman's struggle with societal judgment and personal redemption. It is noted for its faithful representation of Lagerlöf's themes and its exploration of morality and social ostracism in early 20th-century Sweden.

==== The Swedish Horseman (1949) ====
The Swedish Horseman (Svenske ryttaren) is a 1949 historical drama inspired by Leo Perutz's novel The Swedish Rider. The film explores themes of identity, fate, and the supernatural, set against the tumultuous backdrop of 18th-century Europe. It stands out for its atmospheric storytelling and philosophical undertones.

==== Beautiful Helen (1951) ====
Beautiful Helen (Sköna Helena) is a 1951 Swedish musical comedy loosely based on Jacques Offenbach's operetta La Belle Hélène. The film, Edgren's final directorial work, showcases his ability to integrate music with narrative cinema. It features performances by Max Hansen and Eva Dahlbeck, bringing a comedic and satirical touch to classical themes.

== Awards and affiliations ==
- Swedish Film Society Medal (Svenska Filmsamfundets medalj)
- IFK Kristinehamn Gold Merit Medal (I.F.K:s i Kristinehamn förtjänstmedalj i guld) - IFK stands for "Idrottsföreningen Kamraterna" (Sports Club Comrades), the local sports club in Kristinehamn
- Värmland Football Federation Silver Merit Badge (Värmlands Fotbollsförbunds förtjänsttecken i silver) - awarded for 10 years of meritorious service
- Board member of Swedish Youth Ring (Svenska Ungdomsringen), 1921-22
- Member of the Council for the Protection of Kristinehamn's Beauty (Skönhetsrådet i Kristinehamn)
- Member of Swedish Film Society (Svenska Filmsamfundet)

== Legacy ==
Gustaf Edgren is remembered as a pioneering figure in Swedish cinema, known for his ability to create popular, folksy entertainment that resonated with broad audiences. Bengt Forslund, in a 2011 biography, noted that while Edgren might not have been an excellent personal acting coach, he had an exceptional talent for choosing the right actors for the right roles. His lifelong goal was to create popular entertainment for a broad audience. His prolific career, spanning three decades, significantly contributed to the development of Swedish film during the early to mid-20th century.

== Filmography ==
=== As Director ===
Year	Original Title	English Translation
1922	Fröken på Björneborg	Miss at Björneborg
1923	Närkingarna	The People of Närke
1924	Trollebokungen	The Troll King
1925	Styrman Karlssons flammor	First Mate Karlsson's Sweethearts
1925	Skeppargatan 40	40 Skipper Street
1926	Hon, Han och Andersson	She, He, and Andersson / The Rivals
1927	Spökbaronen	The Ghost Baron
1928	Svarte Rudolf	Black Rudolf
1929	Konstgjorda Svensson	The Artificial Svensson
1930	Kronans kavaljerer	The Cavalry of the Crown
1931	Trötte Teodor	Tired Theodore
1931	Röda dagen	The Red Day
1931	Skepp ohoj!	Ship Ahoy!
1932	Värmlänningarna	The Värmlanders
1934	Simon i Backabo	Simon of Backabo
1934	Karl Fredrik regerar	Karl Fredrik Reigns
1935	Valborgsmässoafton	Walpurgis Night
1936	Johan Ulfstjerna	Johan Ulfstjerna
1937	Ryska snuvan	Russian Flu
1937	John Ericsson – segraren vid Hampton Roads	John Ericsson – Victor of the Hampton Roads
1938	Styrman Karlssons flammor	First Mate Karlsson's Sweethearts
1940	Stora famnen	With Open Arms
1943	Lille Napoleon	Little Napoleon
1943	Katrina	Katrina
1944	Dolly tar chansen	Dolly Takes a Chance
1945	Hans Majestät får vänta	His Majesty Must Wait
1946	Driver dagg, faller regn	Sunshine Follows Rain
1946	Kristin kommenderar	Kristin Commands
1947	Tösen från Stormyrtorpet	The Girl from the Marsh Croft
1948	En svensk tiger	A Swedish Tiger
1948	Flottans kavaljerer	The Navy Cavaliers
1949	Svenske ryttaren	The Swedish Horseman
1951	Sköna Helena	Beautiful Helen

=== As Screenplay Writer ===
Year	Original Title	English Translation
1922	Fröken på Björneborg	Miss at Björneborg
1923	Närkingarna	The People of Närke
1924	Trollebokungen	The Troll King
1931	Röda dagen	The Red Day
1932	Värmlänningarna	The Värmlanders
1934	Karl Fredrik regerar	Karl Fredrik Reigns
1935	Valborgsmässoafton	Walpurgis Night
1936	Johan Ulfstjerna	Johan Ulfstjerna
1937	Ryska snuvan	Russian Flu
1937	John Ericsson – segraren vid Hampton Roads	John Ericsson – Victor of the Hampton Roads
1940	Stora famnen	With Open Arms
1943	Lille Napoleon	Little Napoleon
1943	Katrina	Katrina
1944	Dolly tar chansen	Dolly Takes a Chance
1945	Hans Majestät får vänta	His Majesty Must Wait
1946	Kristin kommenderar	Kristin Commands
1946	Driver dagg, faller regn	Sunshine Follows Rain
1947	Tösen från Stormyrtorpet	The Girl from the Marsh Croft
1948	En svensk tiger	A Swedish Tiger
1948	Flottans kavaljerer	The Navy Cavaliers
1949	Svenske ryttaren	The Swedish Horseman
1951	Sköna Helena	Beautiful Helen

=== As Producer ===
Year	Original Title	English Translation
1922	Fröken på Björneborg	Miss at Björneborg
1923	Närkingarna	The People of Närke
1924	Trollebokungen	The Troll King
1925	Styrman Karlssons flammor	First Mate Karlsson's Sweethearts
1925	Skeppargatan 40	40 Skipper Street
1926	Hon, Han och Andersson	The Rivals

=== As Scenario/Story Author ===
Year	Original Title	Type	English Translation
1927	Spökbaronen	Script	The Ghost Baron
1934	Hans Excellens Pettersson	Story	His Excellency Pettersson

=== Other roles ===
Year	Role	Film	English translation
1921	Choreographer	Värmlänningarna	The Värmlanders
1925	Film editor	Skeppargatan 40	40 Skipper Street
1936	Film editor	Johan Ulfstjerna	Johan Ulfstjerna
1946	Production manager	Kristin kommenderar	Kristin Commands
1947	Production manager	Tösen från Stormyrtorpet	The Girl from the Marsh Croft

=== Soundtrack ===
No.	Song title (lyrics) Sköna Helena
1	Ajax-kupletten
2	Det är en dröm
3	Femte kolonnens moral
4	Från himmelens höjd
5	Hovmästarkupletten
6	Ja, ni är så skön
7	Jag är sköna Helenas man
8	Kärlek måste vi ha
9	Ljuva frihet
10	Negerkvartetten
11	Ping pong-kupletten
12	Slavinnornas kör
13	Säg Venus ...

=== Cast appearances ===
Year	Film	English translation	Notes
1921	Värmlänningarna	The Värmlanders	Actor
1931	Brokiga blad	Colourful Pages	Actor (uncredited)
1931	Trötte Teodor	Tired Theodore	Actor
1934	Karl Fredrik regerar	Karl Fredrik Reigns	Actor
1943	SF-journalen 1943 Solna blir stad	SF Journal 1943: Solna Becomes a City	Appearance
1946	Den gamla goda tiden	The Good Old Days	Appearance

=== Private films ===
Year	Original Title	English Translation
1928?	Privatfilm Gustaf Edgren Kristinehamn	Private Film Gustaf Edgren Kristinehamn
1933?	Privatfilm Gustaf Edgren Ålsten	Private Film Gustaf Edgren Ålsten
?	Gustaf Edgrens familjefilm	Gustaf Edgren's Family Film

== Bibliography ==
- "Edgren, Nils (1901–1978), redaktör — Fredrik Ströms arkiv (H 134)" (PDF). Alvin-portal (in Swedish). Uppsala University Library.
- "Svenska Män och Kvinnor: Biografisk Uppslagsbok 2 C-F" [Swedish Men and Women: Biographical Encyclopedia 2 C-F]. Project Runeberg (in Swedish). Stockholm: Albert Bonniers Förlag. 1944. p. 307.
- "Recension av '40° Resfeber' av Edgar P. Andersson". Bonniers litterära magasin (in Swedish). II: 78–79. 1933.
- "Sköna Helena". British Film Institute.
- "Personalnotiser: Förlovningar". Dagens Nyheter (in Swedish). 1921-05-15. p. 7.
- "Dödsannons: Svea Eleonora Edgren". Dagens Nyheter (in Swedish). 1924-03-28. p. 2.
- "Skärgårdsflirt i Jönköping". Dagens Nyheter (in Swedish). 1927-01-02.
- "Varnum Parish, Värmland, Sweden Genealogy". FamilySearch Wiki. The Church of Jesus Christ of Latter-day Saints.
- Forslund, Bengt (2011). Gustaf Edgren: Mästaren och hans fru i skuggan [Gustaf Edgren: The Master and His Wife in the Shadows] (in Swedish). Stockholm: Atlantis. ISBN 978-9173535151.
- Furhammar, Leif (1998). "Swedish Cinema". In Kindem, Gorham (ed.). The International Movie Industry. Carbondale: Southern Illinois University Press. ISBN 978-0809321964.
- Kristinehamns kyrkogårdsförvaltning. "Gravsatta i grav NKE 113–114, Nya kyrkogården, Kristinehamn (Edgren familjegrav)". Svenskagravar.se (in Swedish).
- "Kristinehamns kyrkoarkiv, Lysnings- och vigselbok 1921–1934". Riksarkivet (in Swedish). Volym SE/VA/13289/E I/10, sida 32, vigsel nr 8. Karlstad: Värmlandsarkiv.
- Larsson, Mariah; Marklund, Anders (2010). Swedish Film: An Introduction and Reader. Nordic Academic Press. ISBN 978-91-85509-36-2.
- McIlroy, Brian (1986). World Cinema: Sweden. Flicks Books. ISBN 9780948911484.
- Nordic Women in Film (2024-09-25). "Margit Söderholm". Nordic Women in Film.
- "Edgren, Erik Gustaf". Vem är det: Svensk biografisk handbok 1939 [Who is it: Swedish Biographical Handbook 1939] (in Swedish). Stockholm: P.A. Norstedt & Söners Förlag. 1938. pp. 188–189.
- "Födelseannonser: Varnums församling". Nya Kristinehamnsposten (in Swedish). 1903-12-08. p. 2.
- Qvist, Per Olov; von Bagh, Peter (2000). Guide to the Cinema of Sweden and Finland. Greenwood Publishing Group. ISBN 9780313303777.
- "Blombacka". Nya Wermlandstidningen (in Swedish). 1926-05-08. p. 3.
- "Folkräkning 1900: Erik Gustaf Edgren, Krogsvik, Varnum". Riksarkivet (in Swedish). Swedish National Archives.
- "Folkräkning 1910: Erik Gustaf Edgren, Hedhult, Varnum". Riksarkivet (in Swedish). Swedish National Archives.
- "Folkräkning 1930: Edgren Danielsson, Elin Sofia, Lugnet B, Kristinehamn". Riksarkivet (in Swedish). Swedish National Archives.
- Santas, Constantine; Wilson, James M. (2018). The Essential Films of Ingrid Bergman. Rowman & Littlefield. ISBN 978-1-5381-0138-4.
- Spångberg, August (1966). I tidens ström (PDF). Stockholm: Bok o. bild. Archived from the original (PDF) on 18 August 2010.
- "Svea Edgren". Sundsvalls Tidning (in Swedish). 1924-03-29. p. 5.
- Svenska Filminstitutet (2023). "Gustaf Edgren". Svensk Filmdatabas.
- Svenska Filminstitutet (2025a). "Värmlänningarna (1921)". Svensk Filmdatabas.
- Svenska Filminstitutet (2025b). "John Ericsson – segraren vid Hampton Roads". Svensk Filmdatabas.
- Svenska Filminstitutet (2025c). "Historik". Svensk Filmdatabas.
- Svenska Filminstitutet (2025d). "Utmärkelser - SFdb". Svensk Filmdatabas.
- Svenska Filminstitutet (2025e). "Driver dagg faller regn". Filminstitutet.
- Svenska Filminstitutet (2025f). "Värmlänningarna (1932)". Svensk Filmdatabas.
- Wallengren, Ann-Kristin (2014). Welcome Home Mr Swanson: Swedish Emigrants and Swedishness on Film. Nordic Academic Press. ISBN 978-91-87675-11-9.
- Wright, Rochelle (1998). The Visible Wall: Jews and Other Ethnic Outsiders in Swedish Film. Southern Illinois University Press. ISBN 978-0-8093-2178-0.
