= The Ghost Baron =

1927 film

- Directed by: Gustaf Edgren
- Written by: Sölve Cederstrand; Gustaf Edgren
- Starring: Fridolf Rhudin; Karin Swanström; Enrique Rivero
- Cinematography: Adrian Bjurman
- Edited by: Adrian Bjurman
- Production company: Svensk Filmindustri
- Distributed by: Svensk Filmindustri
- Release date: 17 October 1927
- Running time: 74 minutes
- Country: Sweden
- Languages: Silent; Swedish intertitles

The Ghost Baron (Swedish: Spökbaronen) is a 1927 Swedish drama film directed by Gustaf Edgren and starring Fridolf Rhudin, Karin Swanström and Enrique Rivero. It was shot at the Råsunda Studios in Stockholm. The film's sets were designed by the art director Vilhelm Bryde. It was released in Britain under the alternative title A Sailor's Farewell.

== Cast ==
- Fridolf Rhudin as Baron Conrad Wirvelpihl
- Karin Swanström as Countess Stjärnstråle
- Laure Savidge as Katy Holst
- Enrique Rivero as Lt. Gösta Bramberg
- Weyler Hildebrand as Göran Göransson
- Anita Brodin as Gurli Stjärnstråle
- Oscar Byström as Waldman
- John Melin as Cook
- Thor Modéen as Hair Dresser

== Bibliography ==
- Gustafsson, Tommy. Masculinity in the Golden Age of Swedish Cinema: A Cultural Analysis of 1920s Films. McFarland, 2014.
