= The Österman Brothers' Virago (1932 film) =

1932 film

- Directed by: Thure Alfe
- Written by: Thure Alfe
- Based on: The Österman Brother's Virago by Oscar Wennersten
- Starring: Carl Deurell; Artur Rolén; Frida Sporrong
- Cinematography: Adrian Bjurman
- Edited by: Adrian Bjurman
- Music by: Einar Böckertz
- Production company: Publikfilm
- Release date: 10 September 1932
- Running time: 91 minutes
- Country: Sweden
- Language: Swedish

The Österman Brothers' Virago (Swedish: Bröderna Östermans huskors) is a 1932 Swedish comedy film directed by Thure Alfe and starring Carl Deurell, Artur Rolén and Frida Sporrong. It is one of several films based on the 1913 play of the same title by Oscar Wennersten. Sporrong reprised her role from the 1925 silent film version. It was made at the Segeltorp Studios in Stockholm and on location around Roslagen The film's sets were designed by the art director Bertil Duroj.

== Synopsis ==
The three Österman brothers hire a maid to help them out on their farm, but soon come to regret it when her domineering manner clashes with their lazy ways.

== Cast ==
- Carl Deurell as Lars Österman
- Hugo Jacobsson as Kalle Österman
- Artur Rolén as Nils Österman
- Frida Sporrong as Anna Söderberg
- Nils Jacobsson as Axel Olsson
- Solveig Hedengran as Ella Olsson
- Emmy Albiin as Mother Olsson
- Eric Engstam as Westman
- Edla Rothgardt as Helena Westman

== Bibliography ==
- Larsson, Mariah & Marklund, Anders (ed.). Swedish Film: An Introduction and Reader. Nordic Academic Press, 2010.
