= Johan Ulfstjerna (1936 film) =

1936 film by Gustaf Edgren

- Directed by: Gustaf Edgren
- Written by: Oscar Rydqvist; Gustaf Edgren
- Based on: Johan Ulfstjerna by Tor Hedberg
- Produced by: Stellan Claësson
- Starring: Gösta Ekman; Björn Berglund; Birgit Tengroth
- Cinematography: Julius Jaenzon
- Edited by: Gustaf Edgren
- Music by: Eric Bengtson
- Production company: Svensk Filmindustri
- Distributed by: Svensk Filmindustri
- Release date: 7 September 1936
- Running time: 79 minutes
- Country: Sweden
- Language: Swedish

Johan Ulfstjerna is a 1936 Swedish drama film directed as well as co-written by Gustaf Edgren and starring Gösta Ekman, Björn Berglund and Birgit Tengroth. It is based on the 1907 Tor Hedberg play Johan Ulfstjerna, which had previously been made into a 1923 silent film of the same title. It was shot at the Råsunda Studios in Stockholm. The film's sets were designed by the art director Arne Åkermark.

== Synopsis ==
The film takes place in Helsinki at the turn of the twentieth century when an underground resistance movement attempts to liberate Finland from the Russian Empire. It is the last night of 1899, and students at the university are having a student union dance. Despite the festivities, discontent is simmering. Professor Stenbäck leads the students in an underground movement against the Russians. The country is to become even more Russian according to a new bill, which will soon be signed by the Governor-General. The student movement therefore decides to assassinate the Governor. A lottery is drawn to choose the perpetrator of this act.

== Cast ==
- Gösta Ekman as Johan Ulfstjerna
- Edith Erastoff as Adelaide Ulfstjerna
- Björn Berglund as Helge Ulfstjerna
- Birgit Tengroth as Agda
- Edvin Adolphson as Governor General
- Ernst Eklund as Prof. Stenback
- Carl Ström as Ivan Ivanovitch
- Hugo Björne as Koskinen
- Helge Hagerman as Koskinen Jr.
- Erik Berglund as Pekka, groom
- Jullan Jonsson as Lina
- Carl Deurell as Agda's Father
- Allan Bohlin as Secretary General
- Ernst Brunman as Prison guard
- George Fant as Student
- Georg Fernqvist as Footman
- Peter Höglund as Student
- Arne Lindblad as Governor General's secretary
- Emil Fjellström as Prison guard
- Richard Lund as Arresting officer
- Henrik Schildt as Student
- Emmy Albiin as Older woman

== Bibliography ==
- Goble, Alan. The Complete Index to Literary Sources in Film. Walter de Gruyter, 1999.
