= Walpurgis Night (film) =

1935 film

- Directed by: Gustaf Edgren
- Written by: Oscar Rydqvist; Gustaf Edgren
- Produced by: Stellan Claësson
- Starring: Lars Hanson; Karin Kavli; Victor Sjöström; Ingrid Bergman
- Cinematography: Martin Bodin
- Edited by: Oscar Rosander
- Music by: Eric Bengtson; Friedrich Kuhlau
- Production company: Svensk Filmindustri
- Distributed by: Svensk Filmindustri
- Release date: 23 October 1935
- Running time: 79 minutes
- Country: Sweden
- Language: Swedish

Walpurgis Night (Swedish: Valborgsmässoafton) is a 1935 Swedish drama film directed by Gustaf Edgren and starring Lars Hanson, Karin Kavli, Victor Sjöström and Ingrid Bergman. It was shot at the Filmstaden Råsunda in Stockholm and on location around the city. The film's sets were designed by the art director Arne Åkermark.

== Cast ==
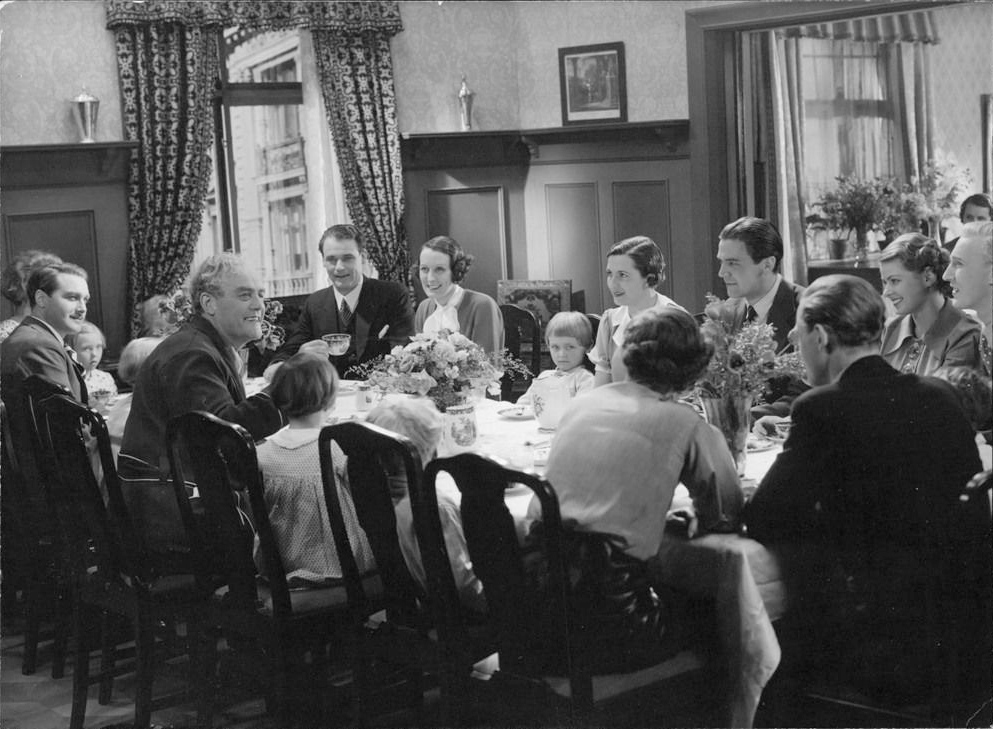
Scene from the film Walpurgis Night

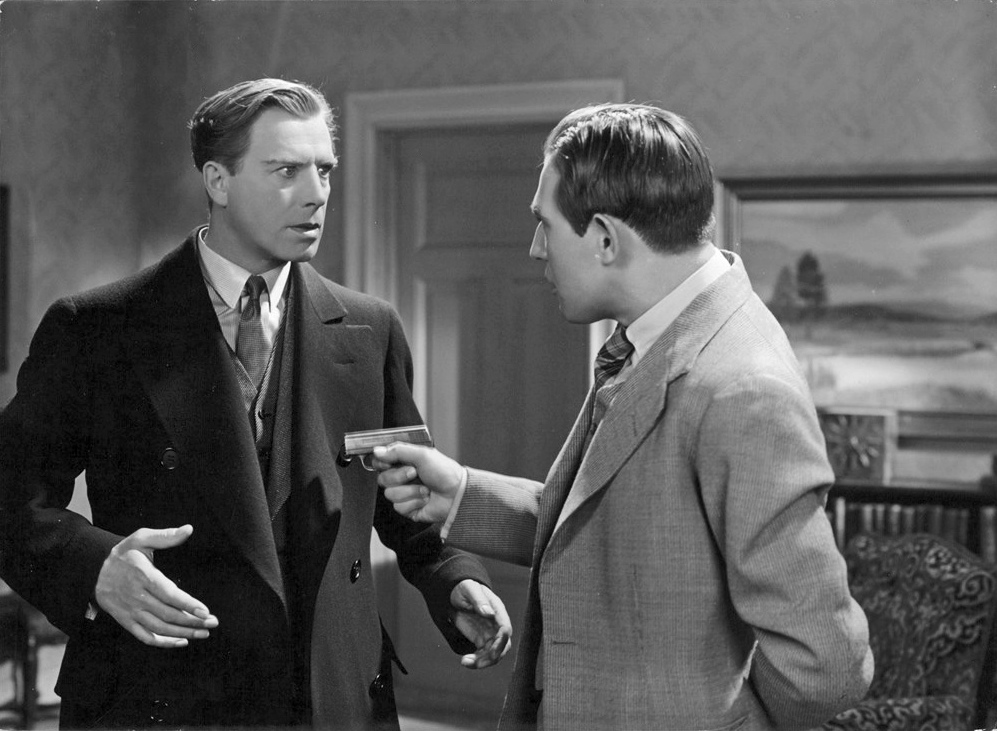
Georg Rydeberg and Lars Hanson in Walpurgis Night

- Lars Hanson as Johan Borg
- Karin Kavli as Clary Borg
- Victor Sjöström as Fredrik Bergström
- Ingrid Bergman as Lena Bergström
- Erik 'Bullen' Berglund as Gustav Palm
- Sture Lagerwall as Svensson
- Marie-Louise Sorbon as Mrs. Svensson
- Georg Rydeberg as Frank Roger
- Georg Blickingberg as Landberg
- Richard Lund as 'Doctor' Smith
- Linnéa Hillberg as Nurse
- Stig Järrel as Grane
- Gabriel Alw as Clary's New Admirer
- Greta Berthels as Maid
- Allan Bohlin as Bergström Jr.
- Carl Deurell as Entrepreneur
- Pekka Hagman as Legionnaire
- Harry Hednoff as Legionnaire
- Folke Helleberg as Bergström's Son
- Anders Henrikson as Paavo
- Torsten Hillberg as Detective
- Ivar Kåge as Speaker at Walpurgis Celebration
- Hjalmar Peters as Detective
- Carl Ström as Office Manager
- Aino Taube as Lena's Friend
- Åke Uppström as Telegram Boy
- Olof Widgren as Reporter
- Torsten Winge as Photographer
- Carl-Gunnar Wingård as Boman

== Bibliography ==
- Larsson, Mariah & Marklund, Anders. Swedish Film: An Introduction and Reader. Nordic Academic Press, 2010.
- Noack, Frank. Veit Harlan: The Life and Work of a Nazi Filmmaker. University Press of Kentucky, 2016.
- Santas, Constantine & Wilson, James M. The Essential Films of Ingrid Bergman. Rowman & Littlefield, 2018.
