= Stockholm dialects =

Swedish variety of Stockholm

Stockholm Swedish
- Stockholmska
- Native to: Sweden
- Region: Stockholm, Sweden
- Language family: Indo-European: Germanic; North Germanic; East Scandinavian; Swedish; Svealand; Stockholm Swedish
- Writing system: Swedish alphabet

Language codes
- ISO 639-3: –
- IETF: se-u-sd-seab

Stockholm dialects (Swedish: Stockholmska) are the forms of Swedish spoken in Stockholm. An exact definition encompassing its peculiarities is hard to find, as a cosmopolitan culture and early adoption infers a great variety of international influences that are then spread to the rest of Sweden, and, as Stockholm is a highly urbanized area, the dialects of Stockholm are more likely to undergo rapid changes than dialects spoken in rural areas.

Some word endings are typical of Stockholm dialects. When windmills were used they were given female names ending in -an. For instance a windmill owned by a Dutchman (holländare) would be called Holländskan ("Dutchwoman"). The -an ending was later adopted for other places. For instance, Kungsträdgården became Kungsan and bibliotek ("library") became bibblan.

Another ending is -is from Latin although in practice it is used roughly as a diminutive or to add familiarity. Examples include Medis (Medborgarplatsen) or Rålis (Rålambshovsparken). Some of these words, such as dagis for daghem ("preschool"), have spread into colloquial Swedish in general.
