= Kan du vissla Johanna? (song) =

"Kan du vissla, Johanna?"

Song
- Language: Swedish
- Released: 1932
- Genre: schlager
- Songwriters: Sten Axelson, Åke Söderblom

"Kan du vissla, Johanna?" is a song with music by Sten Axelson, and lyrics by Åke Söderblom. It was originally recorded in 1932 by many artists.
