= Frank Sundström =

Swedish actor

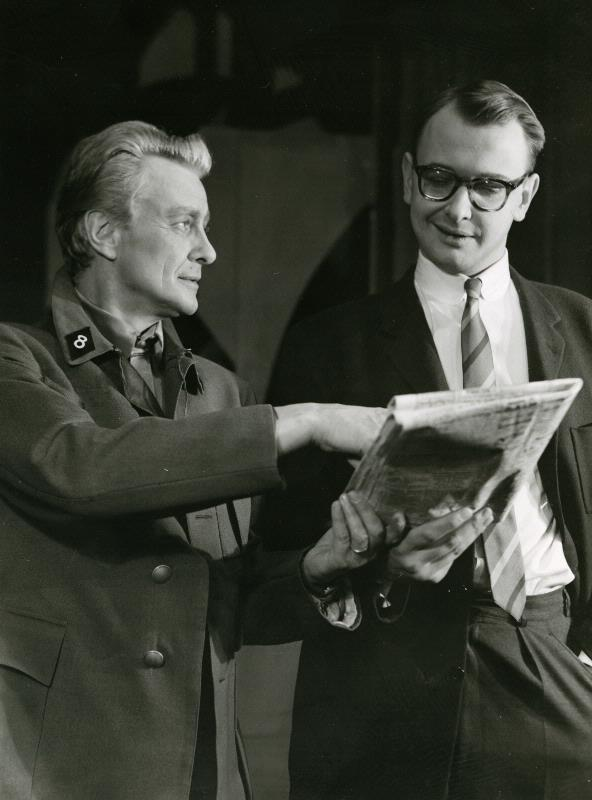
- Frank Sundström with Fredrik Ohlsson
- Born: 16 January 1912; Stockholm, Sweden
- Died: 8 November 1993 (aged 81); Stockholm, Sweden
- Occupation: Actor
- Years active: 1933–1989

Frank Sundström (16 January 1912 – 8 November 1993) was a Swedish actor. He appeared in more than 30 films and television shows between 1933 and 1989. In 1948 he played the lead in the American film Song of My Heart.

== Selected filmography ==
- People of Hälsingland (1933)
- Kanske en gentleman (1935)
- Home from Babylon (1941)
- Dangerous Ways (1942)
- Katrina (1943)
- Kungajakt (1944)
- Song of My Heart (1948)
- No Time to Kill (1959)
- Shame (1968)
