= Jan-Erik Garland =

Swedish cartoonist, journalist and comic creator

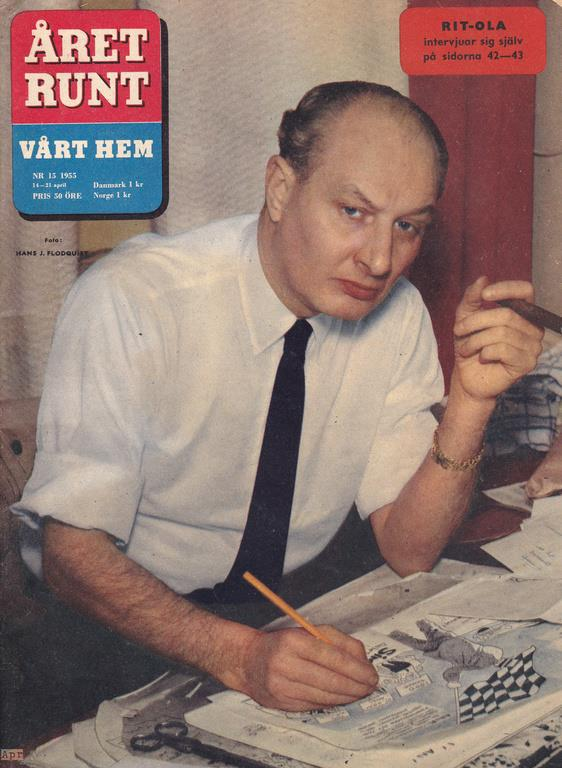

Jan-Erik "Rit-Ola" Garland (1905–1988) was a Swedish cartoonist, journalist and comic creator. Formerly an athlete, Garland later started to draw editorial cartoons and sports caricatures for several Swedish newspapers. In 1936, he created the comic Biffen och Bananen for the magazine Folket i Bild.

He was born in Stockholm, a son of politician Olof Olsson and Gabriella Hainer, and married Nanny Åström in 1936.
