= Nils Jacobsson =

Swedish weightlifter

Personal information
- Nationality: Swedish
- Born: 10 February 1929; Karlstad, Sweden
- Died: 18 July 1982 (aged 53); Karlstad, Sweden

Sport
- Sport: Weightlifting

Nils Jacobsson (10 February 1929 – 18 July 1982) was a Swedish weightlifter. He competed in the men's bantamweight event at the 1952 Summer Olympics.
