= Money (1946 film) =

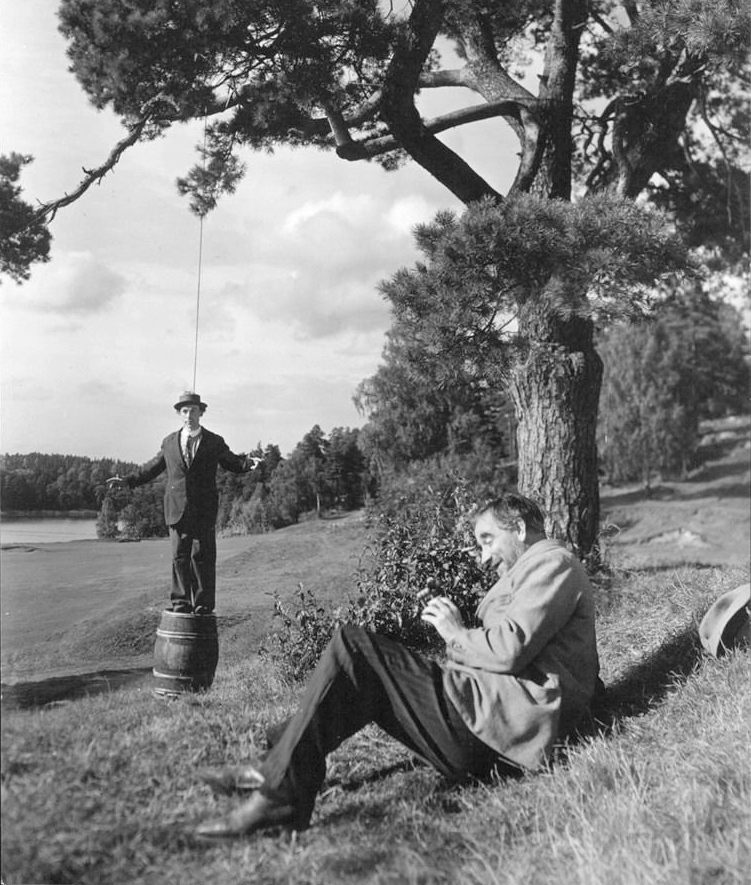
- Still with Nils Poppe and Elof Ahrle
- Directed by: Nils Poppe
- Written by: Nils Poppe, Rolf Botvid
- Produced by: Harald Molander
- Starring: Nils Poppe; Inga Landgré; Elof Ahrle; Sigge Fürst; Carl Reinholdz
- Music by: Sune Waldimir
- Release date: 1 February 1946
- Running time: 98 min
- Country: Sweden
- Language: Swedish

Money (Swedish: Pengar) is a 1946 Swedish comedy film directed by Nils Poppe.

== Plot summary ==
Harry Orvar Larsson is a poor tramp who, because of his hopeless existence put the noose around his neck to try to hang himself. But the rope defects and the spark of life returns to him when he meets a more optimistic partner in adversity, the philosopher and tramp, Anton Bodin.

Harry then gets a job as a lumberjack, with the wicked brothers Sint. He meets the young sweet female cook that works for the brothers and they fall in love with each other.

Surprisingly Harry then inherit a lot of money and is forced to escape from the evil brothers, who try to kill him repeatedly to get their hands on his money.

== Cast ==
- Nils Poppe as Harry Orvar Larsson, million heir
- Sigge Fürst as Sigvard "Sigge" Vildsint, lumberjack
- Carl Reinholdz as Kalle Svagsint, lumberjack
- Hilding Rolin as Hilding Argsint, lumberjack
- Birger Åsander as Birger Ondsint, lumberjack
- Gustaf Färingborg as Gustav Småsint, lumberjack
- Alexander Baumgarten as Helge Långsint, lumberjack
- Inga Landgré as Maria Bergdahl
- Elof Ahrle as Anton "Filosofen" Bodin, tramp
