= Bom the Flyer =

1952 film

- Directed by: Lars-Eric Kjellgren
- Written by: Paul Baudisch; Nils Poppe
- Produced by: Hugo Bolander
- Starring: Nils Poppe; Yvonne Lombard; Gerd Andersson
- Cinematography: Martin Bodin
- Edited by: Tage Holmberg
- Music by: Jules Sylvain
- Production company: Komiska Teatern
- Distributed by: Fribergs Filmbyrå
- Release date: 22 December 1952
- Running time: 98 minutes
- Country: Sweden
- Language: Swedish

Bom the Flyer (Swedish: Flyg-Bom) is a 1952 Swedish comedy film directed by Lars-Eric Kjellgren and starring Nils Poppe, Elisaveta, Yvonne Lombard and Gerd Andersson. It was shot at the Råsunda in Stockholm. The film's sets were designed by the art director Nils Svenwall. It was part of a series of films featuring Poppe as Fabian Bom.

== Cast ==
- Nils Poppe as Fabian Bom / Bom senior
- Elisaveta as Lisa Larsson Röök
- Yvonne Lombard as Saga Saxholm
- Gerd Andersson as Anita Berg
- Gunnar Björnstrand as Sergeant Niklas Slevbrink
- John Botvid as Jonte Larsson Röök
- Arne Källerud as Pluggen, flygbassoldat
- Hjördis Petterson as Fru Wikman
- Inga Landgré as Matilda
- Else Fisher as Amanda
- Margit Andelius as Fröken Psilander
- Sven Magnusson as Stickan, flygbassoldat
- Nils Eklund as Molnet, flygbassoldat
- Arne Lindblad as Jean-Jacques Pampouche
- Ragnar Klange as Grankvist, hyresvärd
- Kenneth Pedersen as Balettstudent
- Per Appelberg as Flygbassoldat
- Josua Bengtson as Ölkompis
- Sven Berghall as Flygbassoldat
- Lily Berglund as Sångare
- Hugo Bolander as Fallskärmsprästen
- Kerstin 'Kicki' Bratt as Modell
- Birgitta Böhm as Balettstudent
- Tom Dan-Bergman as Pilot
- Sven Ericsson as Lång man
- Karl-Axel Forssberg as Postkontorstjänsteman
- Nils Hallberg as Pilot
- Gunnar Hammar as Flygbassoldat
- Gustav Hedberg as Major
- Ulf Johansson as Kapten
- Ludde Juberg as Präst
- Inger-Marianne Klagström as Kyssande flicka
- Olof Krook as Ölkompis
- Fredrik Larsson as Balettstudent
- Uno Larsson as Ölkompis
- Rune Lindkvist as Kyssande man
- Sten Lonnert as Flygbassoldat
- Max Lundek as Flygbassoldat
- Wilma Malmlöf as Balettstudent
- Lena Malmsjö as Balettstudent
- Hans Nilsson as Flygbassoldat
- Ulla Norgren as Flicka med puderdosa
- Birgit Norlindh as Balettstudent
- Anita Rosén as Modell
- Birger Sahlberg as Ölkompis
- Margit Sjödin as Modell
- Helge Sjökvist as Ölkompis
- Olle Teimert as Flygbassoldat
- Berit Thul as Modell
- Bengt Thörnhammar as Flygbassoldat
- Alice Timander as Underklädesmodell
- Birger Åsander as Korpral Svensson

== Bibliography ==
- Qvist, Per Olov & von Bagh, Peter. Guide to the Cinema of Sweden and Finland. Greenwood Publishing Group, 2000.
