= The Biscuit (film) =

1956 film

- Directed by: Hans Lagerkvist
- Written by: Gösta Gustaf-Janson; Nils Poppe
- Produced by: Allan Ekelund
- Starring: Nils Poppe; Marianne Bengtsson; Holger Löwenadler
- Cinematography: Martin Bodin
- Edited by: Oscar Rosander
- Music by: Gunnar Hoffsten; Julius Jacobsen
- Production company: Komiska Teatern
- Distributed by: Fribergs Filmbyrå
- Release date: 19 December 1956
- Running time: 82 minutes
- Country: Sweden
- Language: Swedish

The Biscuit (Swedish: Skorpan) is a 1956 Swedish comedy film directed by Hans Lagerkvist and starring Nils Poppe, Marianne Bengtsson and Holger Löwenadler. It was shot at the Råsunda Studios in Stockholm. The film's sets were designed by the art director P.A. Lundgren.

== Cast ==
- Nils Poppe as Valfrid, pickpocket
- Marianne Bengtsson as Doris
- Holger Löwenadler as Hugo Braxenhielm
- Gunnar Björnstrand as Freddie Braxenhjelm
- Siv Ericks as Mrs. Cecilia Braxenhielm
- Jan Molander as Sixten Braxenhielm
- Elisabet Falk as Ulrika Widell
- Åke Fridell as Filip Schöling
- Anna-Lisa Baude as Mrs. Schöling
- Georg Rydeberg as Lawyer
- Fritiof Billquist as Policeman
- Arthur Fischer as Johansson, first mate
- Ragnar Arvedson as Hair dresser
- Pia Arnell as Amanda, waitress
- Astrid Bodin as Washing-woman
- Rolf Botvid as Policeman
- Birger Åsander as Jojje
- Sven Holmberg as Policeman
- Mille Schmidt as Policeman
- Svea Holst as Braxenhielm's maid
- Ulf Johansson as Jacquetten
- Ludde Juberg as Karlsson
- Arne Lindblad as Man with the watch
- Olav Riégo as Slussberg

== Bibliography ==
- Qvist, Per Olov & von Bagh, Peter. Guide to the Cinema of Sweden and Finland. Greenwood Publishing Group, 2000.
