= The Light from Lund =

1955 film

- Directed by: Hans Lagerkvist
- Written by: John Wigforss (play); Gardar Sahlberg; Paul Baudisch
- Produced by: Allan Ekelund
- Starring: Nils Poppe; Ann-Marie Gyllenspetz; Karl-Arne Holmsten
- Cinematography: Åke Dahlqvist
- Edited by: Oscar Rosander
- Music by: Hans Schreiber
- Production company: Komiska Teatern
- Distributed by: Fribergs Filmbyrå
- Release date: 26 December 1955
- Running time: 85 minutes
- Country: Sweden
- Language: Swedish

The Light from Lund (Swedish: Ljuset från Lund) is a 1955 Swedish comedy film directed by Hans Lagerkvist and starring Nils Poppe, Ann-Marie Gyllenspetz and Karl-Arne Holmsten. It was shot at the Råsunda Studios in Stockholm and on location at Lund in Scania. The film's sets were designed by the art director P.A. Lundgren. It was the third in a series of films feature Poppe in the role of Sten Stensson.

== Cast ==
- Nils Poppe as Sten Stensson Stéen
- Ann-Marie Gyllenspetz as Anna
- Karl-Arne Holmsten as Bengt Lundberg
- Carl Ström as Dean
- Helge Hagerman as Josua Carlander
- Jullan Kindahl as Steen's mother
- Ludde Juberg as Steen's father
- Naemi Briese as Miss Signe
- Harry Ahlin as Rosenblom
- Per Björkman as Jönsson
- Kenneth Hultberg as Pelle
- Anders Ekman as Lennart
- Hanny Schedin as Protester
- Wilma Malmlöf as Protester
- Olav Riégo as Bisterkvist
- Siegfried Fischer as Hökar Olsson
- John Norrman as Hult
- Arne Lindblad as Vestryman
- Ulf Johansson as Clergyman
- Svea Holst as Mrs. Wallin
- Georg Skarstedt as Sigurdsson

== Bibliography ==
- Qvist, Per Olov & von Bagh, Peter. Guide to the Cinema of Sweden and Finland. Greenwood Publishing Group, 2000.
