= The Quartet That Split Up (1950 film) =

1950 film

- Directed by: Gustaf Molander
- Written by: Gösta Stevens; Gustaf Molander
- Based on: The Quartet That Split Up by Birger Sjöberg
- Produced by: Helge Hagerman
- Starring: Adolf Jahr; Anita Björk; Inga Landgré; Victor Sjöström
- Cinematography: Åke Dahlqvist
- Edited by: Oscar Rosander
- Music by: Jerry Högstedt; Yngve Sköld
- Production company: Svensk Filmindustri
- Distributed by: Svensk Filmindustri
- Release date: 26 December 1950
- Running time: 100 minutes
- Country: Sweden
- Language: Swedish

The Quartet That Split Up (Swedish: Kvartetten som sprängdes) is a 1950 Swedish comedy film directed by Gustaf Molander and starring Adolf Jahr, Anita Björk, Inga Landgré and Victor Sjöström. It is an adaptation of the 1924 novel of the same title by Birger Sjöberg, which had previously been made into a 1936 film. It was shot at the Råsunda Studios in Stockholm. The film's sets were designed by the art director Nils Svenwall.

== Synopsis ==
The members of a string quartet in a small Swedish town decided to speculate on the stock market with unexpected results.

== Cast ==
- Adolf Jahr as Karl Ludvig Sundelin
- Anita Björk as Maj Andersson
- Inga Landgré as Märta Åvik
- Victor Sjöström as Gustaf Borg
- Edvin Adolphson as Anders Åvik
- Sven Lindberg as Editor Bengt 'Cello' Erlandsson
- Jarl Kulle as Ture Borg
- Dagmar Ebbesen as Aunt Klara
- Marianne Löfgren as Selma Åvik
- Gunnar Björnstrand as Engineer Planertz
- Olof Winnerstrand as Olsén
- Torsten Winge as Löf
- Gösta Gustafson as Organist
- Stig Olin as Werner
- Anders Andelius as Borg's shop assistant
- Margit Andelius as Olsén's guest
- Gunwer Bergkvist as Member of Anemon choire
- John W. Björling as Man at the waterfront
- Gunnar Bohman as Olsén's guest
- Karl Bornfors as Viola player
- Ernst Brunman as Olsén's guest
- Elsa Ebbesen as Mrs. Tillberg
- Hans Edelskog as Edmund Åvik
- Rune Halvarsson as Jensen, barber
- Olle Hilding as Thun
- Birger Lensander as Factory manager
- Torsten Lilliecrona as Rescuer
- John Melin as Stolz
- Björn Näslund as Olle, Edmund's friend
- Elvin Ottoson as Olsén's guest
- Aurore Palmgren as Alida, Borg's housemaid
- Olav Riégo as Editor at Kuriren
- Lasse Sarri as Pelle, Edmund's friend
- Hanny Schedin as Alma, Åvik's housemaid
- Georg Skarstedt as Backlund
- Carl Ström as Mr. Bergström
- Einar Söderbäck as Factory worker
- Eric von Gegerfelt as Olsén's guest
- Birger Åsander as Factory worker
- Gunnar Öhlund as Rescuer
- Alf Östlund as Olsén's guest

== Bibliography ==
- Goble, Alan. The Complete Index to Literary Sources in Film. Walter de Gruyter, 1999.
- Qvist, Per Olov & von Bagh, Peter. Guide to the Cinema of Sweden and Finland. Greenwood Publishing Group, 2000.
