= Uncle's =

1955 film

- Directed by: Hans Lagerkvist
- Written by: Gösta Gustaf-Janson
- Starring: Nils Poppe; Ann-Marie Gyllenspetz; Holger Löwenadler
- Cinematography: Gunnar Fischer
- Edited by: Oscar Rosander
- Music by: Eskil Eckert-Lundin; Julius Jacobsen
- Production company: Komiska Teatern
- Distributed by: Fribergs Filmbyrå
- Release date: 28 February 1955
- Running time: 85 minutes
- Country: Sweden
- Language: Swedish

Uncle's (Swedish: Stampen) is a 1955 Swedish comedy film directed by Hans Lagerkvist and starring Nils Poppe, Ann-Marie Gyllenspetz and Holger Löwenadler. It was shot at the Råsunda Studios in Stockholm. The film's sets were designed by the art director P.A. Lundgren.

== Synopsis ==
Patrik works in a pawnshop and Viveka is a maid. They meet and are attracted to each other, but both are embarrassed about their real jobs and pretend otherwise. Soon this leads to misunderstandings and further complications ensue.

== Cast ==
- Nils Poppe as Patrik Palmquist
- Ann-Marie Gyllenspetz as Viveka Svensson
- Holger Löwenadler as August Larsson
- Gunnar Björnstrand as Acke Kullerstedt
- Håkan Westergren as Teofon Svensson
- Siv Ericks as Sylvia
- Sven-Eric Gamble as Hogge
- Carl Ström as Oskar Oxelblad
- Gull Natorp as Landlady
- Margita Lindström as Ulla-Britt Svensson
- Gloria Rose as Dancer
- Ludde Juberg as Customer with Parrot
- Emmy Albiin as Amalia Pettersson
- Birgitta Ander as Dancer
- Frithiof Bjärne as Truck Driver
- Gregor Dahlman as Propp
- David Erikson as Svensson's Driver
- Claes Esphagen as Police Officer
- Sven Holmberg as Police Officer
- Ragnar Klange as Fastén
- Uno Larsson as Hot Dog Salesman
- Rune Ottoson as Police Officer
- Gösta Qvist as Customer
- Olav Riégo as Customer with Suit
- Mille Schmidt as Customer with Lighter
- Georg Skarstedt as Karl-Fredrik
- Eric von Gegerfelt as Porter
- Nils Whiten as Older Customer
- Birger Åsander as Man in Line

== Bibliography ==
- Qvist, Per Olov & von Bagh, Peter. Guide to the Cinema of Sweden and Finland. Greenwood Publishing Group, 2000.
