= Don't Give Up (film) =

1947 film

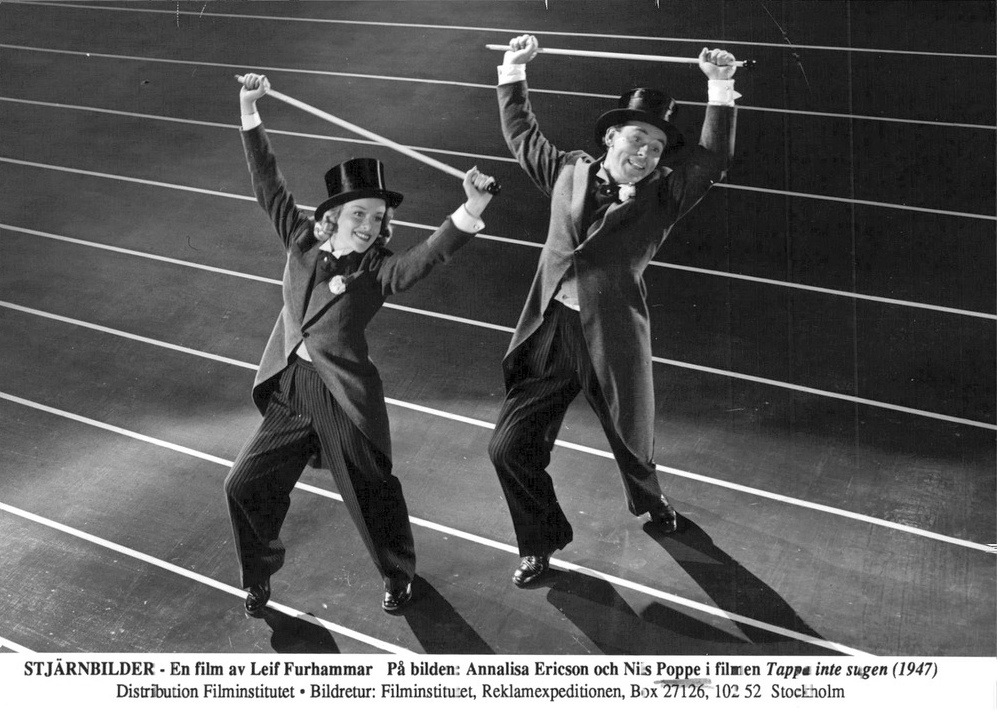
- Directed by: Lars-Eric Kjellgren
- Written by: Edward Horan (musical); Stanley Lupino (musical); Nils Poppe
- Starring: Nils Poppe; Annalisa Ericson; Gaby Stenberg
- Cinematography: Gunnar Fischer
- Edited by: Tage Holmberg
- Music by: Albert Harris; Julius Jacobsen
- Production companies: Fribergs Filmbyrå AB; Komiska Teatern
- Release date: 1947
- Running time: 94 minutes
- Country: Sweden
- Language: Swedish

Don't Give Up (Swedish:Tappa inte sugen) is a 1947 Swedish musical comedy film directed by Lars-Eric Kjellgren and starring Nils Poppe, Annalisa Ericson and Gaby Stenberg. It was based on the 1941 British stage show Lady Behave by Edward Horan and Stanley Lupino.

The film's sets were designed by the art director Nils Svenwall.

== Cast ==
- Nils Poppe as Pelle Olsson
- Annalisa Ericson as Gulli
- Gaby Stenberg as Sonja Lind
- Ulla Sallert as Ylva Vendel
- Karl-Arne Holmsten as Allan Berger
- Sigge Fürst as Albert Svensson
- Stig Järrel as Author Valle
- Folke Hamrin as Studio Executive
- Nils Jacobsson as Rudling
- Arne Lindblad as André
- Margit Andelius as CEO Secretary
- Wiktor Andersson as Studio Auditor
- Astrid Bodin as Cleaning Woman
- Ernst Brunman as Jack
- Eskil Eckert-Lundin as Man in the Studio
- Lars Ekborg as Pelle Olsson's Neighbor
- Carl-Axel Elfving as Assistant Director
- Sven Ericsson as Pelle Olsson's Neighbor
- Karl Erik Flens as Viktor
- Albert Gaubier as Dancer
- Stig Grybe as Pelle Olsson's Neighbor
- Marie Hedeholm as Script Supervisor
- Axel Isaksson as Man in the Studio
- Tryggve Jerneman as Man in the Studio
- Helge Karlsson as Doorman
- Börje Lundh as Makeup Artist
- Rune Magnusson as Sound Assistant
- Mary Rapp as Model
- Erik Rosén as Art Director
- Alexander von Baumgarten as Bartender
- Nils Whiten as Unit Manager

== Bibliography ==
- Monaco, James. The Encyclopedia of Film. Perigee Books, 1991.
