= Jan Molander =

Swedish actor and film director

- Born: Jan Göran Gustaf Harald Molander; 2 April 1920; Stockholm, Sweden
- Died: 30 June 2009 (aged 89); Stockholm, Sweden
- Occupations: Actor, director
- Children: 2
- Parent: Gustaf Molander (father)
- Relatives: Harald Molander (sibling)

Jan Göran Gustaf Harald Molander (2 April 1920 – 30 June 2009) was a Swedish actor and film director who had a decades-long dominant career in his country's film and television industry.

A native of Stockholm, Jan Molander was the son of actor/director Gustaf Molander and Elsa Fahlberg and the half-brother of director and producer Harald Molander from his father's first marriage to actress Karin Molander. From 1942 to 1945 he was a pupil at the Royal Dramatic Training Academy and made his film debut playing a student in 1944's critically acclaimed Hets (Torment), directed by Alf Sjöberg and written by the film's assistant director Ingmar Bergman. He worked for Sveriges Radio and television in the 1950s and 60s as a director and was in charge of radioteatern [radio theater] between 1969 and 1972.

Jan Molander died on 30 June 2009, at the age of 89, and a tribute to him by Rutger Barnekow and Mats Qviberg was published in the 3 July 2009 edition of Sweden's largest-circulation morning newspaper, Dagens Nyheter. His daughters Anita Molander (born 1950) and Mari Molander (born 1954) have also had careers in the entertainment industry—Anita as an actress and Mari as a dancer, actress and director. His granddaughter Dao Di Ponziano is an actress and singer.

== Selected filmography ==
- Crime in the Sun (1947)
- Dinner for Two (1947)
- Foreign Harbour (1948)
- Sunshine (1948)
- Life Starts Now (1948)
- Vagabond Blacksmiths (1949)
- Playing Truant (1949)
- Dangerous Spring (1949)
- The Kiss on the Cruise (1950)
- Fiancée for Hire (1950)
- My Name Is Puck (1951)
- Customs Officer Bom (1951)
- Love (1952)
- Classmates (1952)
- The Girl from Backafall (1953)
- Darling of Mine (1955)
- The Biscuit (1956)
- Woman in a Fur Coat (1958)
- Fridolf Stands Up! (1958)
- Hello Baby (1976)
