= Customs Officer Bom =

1951 film

- Directed by: Lars-Eric Kjellgren
- Written by: Nils Poppe; Paul Baudisch; Adolf Schütz
- Starring: Nils Poppe; Inga Landgré; Gunnar Björnstrand
- Cinematography: Martin Bodin
- Edited by: Oscar Rosander
- Music by: Julius Jacobsen
- Production company: Fribergs Filmbyrå AB
- Release date: 25 June 1951
- Running time: 81 minutes
- Country: Sweden
- Language: Swedish

Customs Officer Bom (Swedish: Tull-Bom) is a 1951 Swedish comedy film directed by Lars-Eric Kjellgren and starring Nils Poppe, Inga Landgré and Gunnar Björnstrand.

The film's sets were designed by the art director Nils Svenwall.

== Synopsis ==
A customs officer leads the search for a missing young woman.

== Cast ==
- Nils Poppe as Fabian Bom
- Inga Landgré as Frida
- Gunnar Björnstrand as Frans Melin, aka Hamn-Casanova
- Jan Molander as Urban Karlsson
- Marianne Löfgren as Aurora
- Harry Ahlin as Ingemar Berglund
- Fritiof Billquist as Johansson
- Ulla Norgren as Aina
- Nils Hallberg as Kalle Värst
- Alf Östlund as Skakis
- Olav Riégo as Head of Customs
- Arne Lindblad as Hugo Larsson
- Margit Andelius as Miss Agnelius, the new secretary
- Bisse Andersson as Dancer
- Eddy Andersson as French policeman
- Wiktor Andersson as Night watchman at the funfair
- Karin Appelberg-Sandberg as Tickert woman at the variety
- Gunwer Bergkvist as Young woman
- Barbro Boman as French singer at Coq d'Or in Le Havre
- Ivan Bousé as Jean, French smuggler
- Knut Burgh as Man with stockings to declare
- Nils Croona as Smuggler
- Doreen Denning as French girl
- Einar Eriksson as Waiter at Coq d'Or in Le Havre
- Michael Fant as Customs officer
- Siegfried Fischer as Archivist at the customs office
- Anna-Lisa Fröberg as Woman with cloth to declare
- Thomas Gistedt as Aurora's son
- Herman Greid as German
- Freddy Groneman as German customs officer
- Mary Gräber as American tourist's wife
- Emil Halberg as Danish customs officer
- Gustaf Hiort af Ornäs as Custom officer
- Karl-Arne Holmsten as Narrator (voice)
- Gösta Holmström as Policeman at the docks
- Ingemar Jacobsson as Policeman at the docks
- Gunnar Johansson as Policeman at warehouse no. 15
- Sten-Morris Johansson as Aurora's son
- Ludde Juberg as Traveller with a bottle to declare
- Sven-Lennart Karlsson as Aurora's son
- Arne Källerud Sailor on 'Stella'
- Torsten Lilliecrona as French prison guard
- Lennart Lindberg as First mate on 'Stella'
- Carl-Gustaf Lindstedt as Radio officer at 'Stella'
- Calle Lindström as Aurora's son
- Gösta Lycke as Swedish customs officer
- Börje Mellvig as French police inspector
- Börje Nyberg as Customs officer
- Verner Oakland as American tourist in a cabriolet
- John Roos as Dutch customs officer
- Birger Sahlberg as Man at the show at the funfair
- Walter Sarmell as A man
- Henrik Schartau as Sailor on 'Stella'
- Henrik Schildt as French policeman
- Gurli Swahn as Dancer
- Katarina Taikon as Girl at Coq d'Or in Le Havre
- Olle Teimert as Customs officer
- Carl-Mats Törnblom as Aurora's son
- Alexander von Baumgarten as Jacques, French smuggler
- Peter Winner as French prison guard
- Bo Wärff as Customs officer
- Fylgia Zadig as Sonja at 47:ans Café
- Curt 'Minimal' Åström as Desk clerk at the customs office

== Bibliography ==
- Per Olov Qvist & Peter von Bagh, Guide to the Cinema of Sweden and Finland. Greenwood Publishing Group, 2000.
