= The Kiss on the Cruise =

1950 film

- Directed by: Arne Mattsson
- Written by: Hasse Ekman; Arne Mattsson
- Produced by: Allan Ekelund
- Starring: Annalisa Ericson; Gunnar Björnstrand; Karl-Arne Holmsten
- Cinematography: Åke Dahlqvist
- Edited by: Lennart Wallén
- Music by: Julius Jacobsen
- Production company: Svensk Filmindustri
- Distributed by: Svensk Filmindustri
- Release date: 16 December 1950
- Running time: 100 minutes
- Country: Sweden
- Language: Swedish

The Kiss on the Cruise (Swedish: Kyssen på kryssen) is a 1950 Swedish comedy film directed by Arne Mattsson and starring Annalisa Ericson, Gunnar Björnstrand and Karl-Arne Holmsten. The film's sets were designed by the art director Nils Svenwall. It was shot at the Råsunda Studios in Stockholm with location shooting in London, Lisbon, Madeira and Morocco.

== Synopsis ==
Lasse Brenner, a celebrated film director known for his realist dramas is offered a contract to take over a film backed by a wealthy manufacturer. Set on a cruise ship, he sees this as a chance of a holiday in which he can bring his wife Sonja, a famous star along. The only stipulation is that the manufacturer's daughter Lisa Yhlén, an aspiring actress, must appear in the film. Sonja takes a dislike to Lisa, who is almost identical to her. The protagonists all head to London where they join the ship heading out to the Mediterranean. A series of mistaken identities ensues.

== Cast ==
- Annalisa Ericson as Sonja Brenner / Lisa Yhlén
- Gunnar Björnstrand as Film Director Lasse Brenner
- Karl-Arne Holmsten as James Deckert
- Åke Grönberg as Knutte Glans
- Jan Molander as Josef
- Olof Winnerstrand as Deckert
- Bengt Eklund as Actor
- Julia Cæsar as Cleaning Lady
- Håkan Westergren as Felix
- Marianne Löfgren as Actress
- Lasse Krantz as Yhlén
- Wiktor Andersson as Pettersson
- Ingegerd Ehn as Judit Karlsson
- Anita Rosén as Vera
- Harriet Andersson as Girl in Brenner's Movie
- Stig Johanson as Painter at the Studio
- David Erikson as Laboratory Manager
- Ludde Juberg as Passenger on 'Saga'
- Olav Riégo as Ship's Doctor
- Sven Lindberg as Academic in Uppsala
- Åke Lindström as Man
- Fylgia Zadig as Miss Larsson
- Birger Åsander as Pirate
- Georg Skarstedt as Pirate
- John Melin as Pirate
- Alf Östlund as Autograph Hunter
- Alexander von Baumgarten as Proprietor of Bella Vista
- Magnus Kesster as Man in the White Suit

== Bibliography ==
- Gustafsson, Fredrik (2016). The Man from the Third Row: Hasse Ekman, Swedish Cinema and the Long Shadow of Ingmar Bergman. Berghahn Books. ISBN 9781785332500. OCLC 965476172.
- Qvist, Per Olov; von Bagh, Peter (2000). Guide to the Cinema of Sweden and Finland. Greenwood Publishing Group. ISBN 9780313303777. OCLC 40632681.
