= Stupid Bom =

1953 film

- Directed by: Nils Poppe
- Written by: Paul Baudisch; Nils Poppe
- Produced by: Otto Scheutz
- Starring: Nils Poppe; Inga Landgré; Hjördis Petterson
- Cinematography: Göran Strindberg
- Edited by: Eric Nordemar
- Music by: Hans Schreiber
- Production company: Komiska Teatern
- Distributed by: Sandrew-Baumanfilm
- Release date: 26 December 1953
- Running time: 82 minutes
- Country: Sweden
- Language: Swedish

Stupid Bom (Swedish: Dumbom) is a 1953 Swedish comedy film directed by Nils Poppe and starring Poppe, Inga Landgré, Hjördis Petterson and Ulf Johansson. It was shot at the Centrumateljéerna Sudios in Stockholm. The film's sets were designed by the art director Nils Nilsson. It was part of a series of films featuring Poppe as Fabian Bom.

== Synopsis ==
Fabian Bom is mayor of a town which he has reformed through efficiency projects. Confusions arises when his long-lost twin brother arrives in town as the clown of a travelling circus.

== Cast ==
- Nils Poppe as Fabian Bom / Dumbom
- Inga Landgré as Camilla
- Hjördis Petterson as Fru Holmström
- Ulf Johansson as Nilsson
- Dagmar Ebbesen as Fru Marinetti-Bock
- Arne Lindblad as Emanuel Bock
- Torsten Lilliecrona as Beppo
- Gunnar Olsson as Julius, trädgårdsmästaren
- Elsa Ebbesen as Ester
- Dagmar Olsson as Fröken Olofsson
- Bibi Andersson as Elvira
- Marianne Gyllenhammar as Komiska damen på cirkusen
- Ludde Juberg as Vaktmästare i stadshuset
- Ragnar Klange as Överkonstapeln
- Rune Ottoson as Olsson, tjänsteman
- Sven Melin as Svensson, tjänsteman
- Göthe Grefbo as Pettersson, stadsrevisor
- Mille Schmidt as Fabian Boms chaufför
- Ingrid Jellart as Camilla som barn
- Bo Gustafsson as Fabian som barn
- Bengt Gustafsson as Dumbom som barn

== Bibliography ==
- Qvist, Per Olov & von Bagh, Peter. Guide to the Cinema of Sweden and Finland. Greenwood Publishing Group, 2000.
