= Birger Åsander =

Swedish actor (1909–1984)

- Born: 13 July 1909; Kramfors, Sweden
- Died: 17 January 1984 (aged 74); Stockholm, Sweden
- Occupation: Actor
- Years active: 1938-1980

Birger Åsander (13 July 1909 – 17 January 1984) was a Swedish actor. He appeared in more than 90 films and television shows between 1938 and 1980.

== Selected filmography ==
- Career (1938)
- Imprisoned Women (1943)
- The Brothers' Woman (1943)
- The Forest Is Our Heritage (1944)
- My People Are Not Yours (1944)
- The Emperor of Portugallia (1944)
- The Girl and the Devil (1944)
- The Österman Brothers' Virago (1945)
- Barnen från Frostmofjället (1945)
- The Rose of Tistelön (1945)
- Pengar – en tragikomisk saga (1946)
- Incorrigible (1946)
- The Wedding on Solö (1946)
- Rail Workers (1947)
- The Poetry of Ådalen (1947)
- The Bride Came Through the Ceiling (1947)
- Private Bom (1948)
- Big Lasse of Delsbo (1949)
- Dangerous Spring (1949)
- Son of the Sea (1949)
- The Quartet That Split Up (1950)
- The Kiss on the Cruise (1950)
- The Saucepan Journey (1950)
- A Ghost on Holiday (1951)
- Bom the Flyer (1952)
- The Clang of the Pick (1952)
- One Fiancée at a Time (1952)
- The Chieftain of Göinge (1953)
- Bill Bergson and the White Rose Rescue (1953)
- Taxi 13 (1954)
- Salka Valka (1954)
- Storm Over Tjurö (1954)
- Our Father and the Gypsy (1954)
- Enchanted Walk (1954)
- The People of Hemsö (1955)
- Uncle's (1955)
- Whoops! (1955)
- The Biscuit (1956)
- The Stranger from the Sky (1956)
- The Song of the Scarlet Flower (1956)
- We at Väddö (1958)
- Rider in Blue (1959)
- Ticket to Paradise (1962)
- Sailors (1964)
- Pistol (1973)
