= Dagny Lind =

Swedish actress (1902–1992)

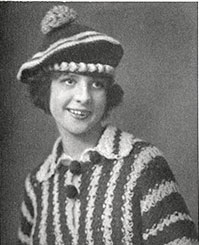
- Born: 7 November 1902; Stockholm, Sweden
- Died: 13 January 1992 (aged 89); Malmö, Sweden
- Occupation: Actress
- Years active: 1923-1977

Dagny Lind (7 November 1902 – 13 January 1992) was a Swedish film actress. She appeared in 15 films between 1923 and 1977.

== Filmography ==
Year	Title	Role	Notes
1923	Gamla gatans karneval	Gullan Storm	
1924	Dan, tant och lilla fröken Söderlund	Ms. Söderlund	
1926	Lyckobarnen	Elisabeth	
1930	Frida's Songs	One of Hasse's girlfriends	Uncredited
1946	Crisis	Ingeborg	
1946	When the Meadows Blossom	Mrs. Hellman	
1949	Son of the Sea	Sigrid Bakken	
1950	To Joy	Grandmother	Uncredited
1953	The Beat of Wings in the Night	Mrs. Tornelius	
1953	Bread of Love	Bouncer's Mother	
1954	Seger i mörker	Mrs. Persson	Uncredited
1958	Rabies	Moster	TV movie
1959	A Lion in Town	Burgomaster's Wife	Uncredited
1977	Summer Paradise	Alma	
