= Douglas Håge =

Swedish actor

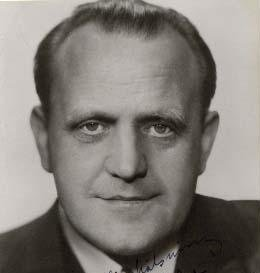
- Born: Oskar Fredrik Douglas Hansson; 6 March 1898; Gothenburg, Sweden
- Died: 18 November 1959 (aged 61); Gothenburg, Sweden
- Occupation: Actor
- Years active: 1932–1959

Oskar Fredrik Douglas Håge (nė Hansson; 6 March 1898 – 18 November 1959) was a Swedish actor. He appeared in nearly 100 films between 1932 and 1959.

== Selected filmography ==
- Career (1938)
- Just a Bugler (1938)
- The Great Love (1938)
- Nothing But the Truth (1939)
- With Open Arms (1940)
- Only a Woman (1941)
- Goransson's Boy (1941)
- Skipper Jansson (1944)
- Dolly Takes a Chance (1944)
- My People Are Not Yours (1944)
- Blood and Fire (1945)
- The Girls in Smaland (1945)
- Oss tjuvar emellan eller En burk ananas (1945)
- It Rains on Our Love (1946)
- While the Door Was Locked (1946)
- Evening at the Djurgarden (1946)
- A Ship to India (1947)
- Poor Little Sven (1947)
- Private Karlsson on Leave (1947)
- Dinner for Two (1947)
- The Bride Came Through the Ceiling (1947)
- Song of Stockholm (1947)
- The Night Watchman's Wife (1947)
- Music in Darkness (1948)
- Private Bom (1948)
- A Swedish Tiger (1948)
- Life at Forsbyholm Manor (1948)
- Playing Truant (1949)
- Fiancée for Hire (1950)
- Teacher's First Born (1950)
- Knockout at the Breakfast Club (1950)
- My Friend Oscar (1951)
- A Ghost on Holiday (1951)
- The Chieftain of Göinge (1953)
- Café Lunchrasten (1954)
- Men in the Dark (1955)
- Whoops! (1955)
- The Summer Wind Blows (1955)
- The People of Hemsö (1955)
- A Little Nest (1956)
- Miss April (1958)
- Fridolf Stands Up! (1958)
- Sängkammartjuven (1959)
