= Arne Lindblad =

Swedish actor

- Born: Arne Lorentz Lindblad; 30 January 1887; Gothenburg, Sweden
- Died: 19 December 1964 (aged 77); Täby, Sweden
- Occupation: Actor
- Years active: 1934–1964

Arne Lindblad (30 January 1887 – 19 December 1964) was a Swedish film actor. He appeared in more than 100 films between 1934 and 1964.

== Selected filmography ==
- Simon of Backabo (1934)
- Johan Ulfstjerna (1936)
- Unfriendly Relations (1936)
- The Girls of Uppakra (1936)
- Hotel Paradise (1937)
- Career (1938)
- Adolf Saves the Day (1938)
- Mot nya tider (1939)
- Life Begins Today (1939)
- We at Solglantan (1939)
- The Two of Us (1939)
- Kiss Her! (1940)
- Hanna in Society (1940)
- Her Melody (1940)
- Heroes in Yellow and Blue (1940)
- The Three of Us (1940)
- The Crazy Family (1940)
- Sunny Sunberg (1941)
- The Ghost Reporter (1941)
- Lasse-Maja (1941)
- The Poor Millionaire (1941)
- Sun Over Klara (1942)
- Adventurer (1942)
- A Girl for Me (1943)
- In Darkest Smaland (1943)
- Johansson and Vestman (1946)
- The Balloon (1946)
- Kristin Commands (1946)
- Crisis (1946)
- Wedding Night (1947)
- How to Love (1947)
- Don't Give Up (1947)
- Neglected by His Wife (1947)
- Poor Little Sven (1947)
- Music in Darkness (1948)
- Loffe as a Millionaire (1948)
- Number 17 (1949)
- Father Bom (1949)
- Two Stories Up (1950)
- Perhaps a Gentleman (1950)
- Customs Officer Bom (1951)
- Bom the Flyer (1952)
- Say It with Flowers (1952)
- Kalle Karlsson of Jularbo (1952)
- Ursula, the Girl from the Finnish Forests (1953)
- Stupid Bom (1953)
- Dance, My Doll (1953)
- Our Father and the Gypsy (1954)
- Darling of Mine (1955)
- The Light from Lund (1955)
- Stage Entrance (1956)
- The Biscuit (1956)
