= Private Bom =

1948 film

- Directed by: Lars-Eric Kjellgren
- Written by: Paul Baudisch; Nils Poppe; Adolf Schütz
- Produced by: Harald Molander
- Starring: Nils Poppe; Inga Landgré; Gunnar Björnstrand
- Cinematography: Gunnar Fischer
- Edited by: Oscar Rosander
- Music by: Kai Gullmar; Sune Waldimir
- Production company: Fribergs Filmbyrå AB
- Distributed by: Fribergs Filmbyrå
- Release date: 15 December 1948
- Running time: 89 minutes
- Country: Sweden
- Language: Swedish

Private Bom (Swedish: Soldat Bom) is a 1948 Swedish comedy film directed by Lars-Eric Kjellgren and starring Nils Poppe, Inga Landgré and Gunnar Björnstrand. The film's sets were designed by the art director Nils Svenwall. It was part of a series starring Poppe as Fabian Bom.

== Cast ==
- Nils Poppe as Fabian Bom
- Inga Landgré as Agnes
- Gunnar Björnstrand as Korpral Berglund
- Julia Cæsar as Carolina Hård
- Douglas Håge as Major Killman
- Naima Wifstrand as Översköterskan
- Gunnel Wadner as Gabriella Killman
- Gösta Cederlund as Översten
- Ludde Juberg as Zakarias
- Åke Jensen as Löjtnant Forsberg
- Nils Hallberg as Kalle
- Nils Jacobsson as Militärläkaren
- Karl Erik Flens as Korpralen
- Wiktor Andersson as Lokföraren
- Astrid Bodin as Kvinnan vid porten
- Ernst Brunman as Karl Gustafsson
- Carl Deurell as Prästen
- Carl-Axel Elfving as Soldat på väg till dansbanan
- Stig Ossian Ericson as Tjänstemannen
- Erna Groth as Sjuksyster
- Torsten Lilliecrona as Inskrivningsofficeren
- Margreth Weivers as Receptionisten
- Birger Åsander as Officer

== Bibliography ==
- Qvist, Per Olov & von Bagh, Peter. Guide to the Cinema of Sweden and Finland. Greenwood Publishing Group, 2000.
