= Paul Baudisch =

Austrian writer

- Born: 19 June 1899; Vienna, Austro-Hungarian Empire
- Died: 11 June 1977 (aged 77); Stockholm, Sweden
- Occupation: Writer
- Years active: 1941-1959 (film)

Paul Baudisch (June 19, 1899 - June 11, 1977) was an Austrian screenwriter, novelist and translator. He came to Sweden as a refugee following the Anschluss of 1938 and worked in the country's film industry. He frequently collaborated with fellow Austrian émigré Adolf Schütz. He translated Ernest Hemingway's For Whom the Bell Tolls into German.

== Selected filmography ==
- Only a Woman (1941)
- Tonight or Never (1941)
- Black Roses (1945)
- Harald the Stalwart (1946)
- Private Bom (1948)
- Father Bom (1949)
- The Red Signal (1949)
- The Swedish Horseman (1949)
- Melody of Fate (1950)
- Customs Officer Bom (1951)
- Professor Nachtfalter (1951)
- Bom the Flyer (1952)
- Stupid Bom (1953)
- Dance, My Doll (1953)
- The Light from Lund (1955)
- Only a Waiter (1959)

== Bibliography ==
- Forsman, Johanna & Sundstedt, Kjell. Det svenska filmmanusets historia. Albert Bonniers Förlag, 2021.
- Kaindl, Klaus, Kolb, Waltraud & Schlager, Daniela. Literary Translator Studies. John Benjamins Publishing Company, 2021.
- Palmier, Jean-Michel. Weimar in Exile: The Antifascist Emigration in Europe and America. Verso Books, 2017
