= Gerd Andersson =

Swedish actress (born 1932)

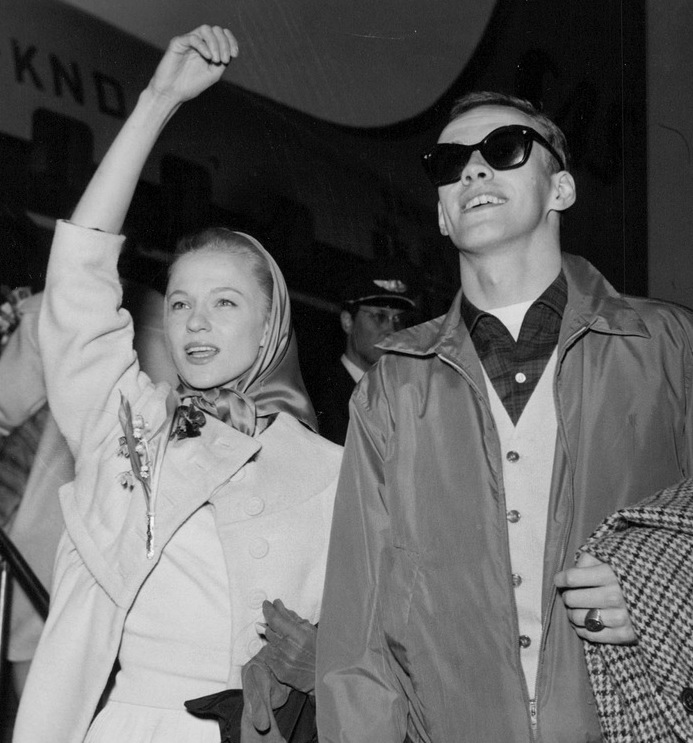
- Born: 11 June 1932 (age 94); Stockholm, Sweden
- Occupations: Actress; ballet dancer
- Years active: 1951–1989

Gerd Gunvor Andersson (born 11 June 1932) is a Swedish film actress. She was born in Stockholm, Sweden and is the sister of Bibi Andersson and the mother of Lars Bethke.

Andersson studied at the Royal Swedish Ballet School and was promoted to principal dancer in 1958. She danced in various classical roles including Giselle and created the main role in Echoing of Trumpets.

== Selected filmography ==
- Summer Interlude (1951)
- Bom the Flyer (1952)
- Secrets of Women (1952)
- The Great Amateur (1958)
- Fanny and Alexander (1982)
