= Only a Waiter =

1959 film

- Directed by: Alf Kjellin
- Written by: Nils Poppe; Paul Baudisch; Adolf Schütz; Bengt Linder
- Starring: Nils Poppe; Marianne Bengtsson; Git Gay
- Cinematography: Martin Bodin
- Edited by: Oscar Rosander
- Music by: Hans Schreiber
- Production company: Fribergs Filmbyrå
- Distributed by: Fribergs Filmbyrå
- Release date: 28 September 1959
- Running time: 85 minutes
- Country: Sweden
- Language: Swedish

Only a Waiter (Swedish: Bara en kypare) is a 1959 Swedish comedy film directed by Alf Kjellin and starring Nils Poppe, Marianne Bengtsson and Git Gay. It was the last in a series of seven films featuring Poppe in the role of Fabian Bom. It was shot at the Råsunda Studios in Stockholm. The film's sets were designed by the art director P.A. Lundgren. It was the final screen appearance of the comedy actress Emy Hagman.

== Synopsis ==
A waiter leads a secret double life as a stage entertainer and dreams of a big career ahead of him. He ignores his colleague Annie, who due to a recent inheritance wants him to help her run a new hotel. His head is turned when the world-famous performer Matilda comes to town, and he follows her to Stockholm.

== Cast ==
- Nils Poppe as Fabian Bom
- Marianne Bengtsson as Annie
- Git Gay as Matilda Roos
- Karl-Arne Holmsten as Birger
- Adolf Jahr as Restaurangägare
- Emy Hagman as Selma
- Sigge Fürst as Manager
- Curt Masreliez as Gösta Susenberg
- Sven-Eric Gamble as Byggnadsarbetare
- Ragnar Klange as Krögare
- Carl-Gunnar Wingård as Restauranggäst
- Hanny Schedin as Aina
- Georg Skarstedt as Öldrickare
- Carl Reinholdz as Man med överrock
- Wilma Malmlöf as Portvakten
- Gunnar 'Knas' Lindkvist as Kypare i restaurangvagnen

== Bibliography ==
- Qvist, Per Olov & von Bagh, Peter. Guide to the Cinema of Sweden and Finland. Greenwood Publishing Group, 2000.
