= Nils Poppe =

Swedish actor (1908–2000)

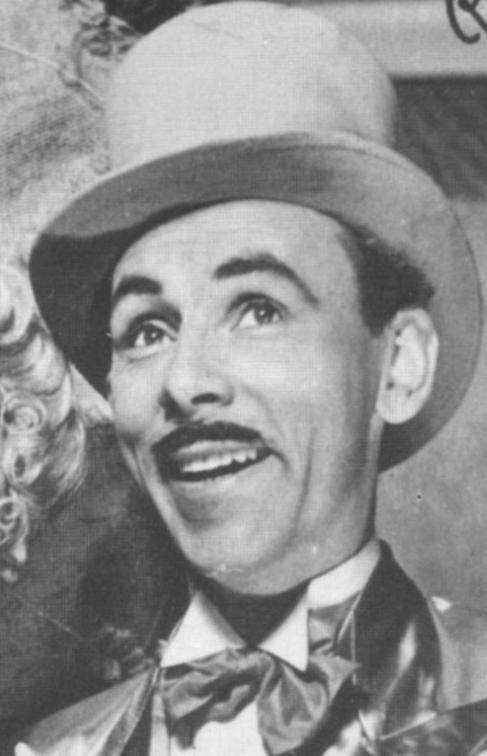
- Poppe in 1942
- Born: Nils Einar Jönsson; 31 May 1908; Malmö, Sweden
- Died: 28 June 2000 (aged 92); Helsingborg, Sweden
- Occupation(s): Actor, comedian, theatre manager
- Spouses: Inga Landgré (m. 1949; div. 1959) Gunilla Sundberg (m. 1965)
- Children: Anja Landgré; Dan Landgré; Thomas Poppe; Mia Poppe

Nils Poppe (31 May 1908 – 28 June 2000) was a Swedish actor, comedian, director, screenwriter and theatre manager. He is internationally most famous for his part in Ingmar Bergman's The Seventh Seal, but in Sweden he was much loved and participated in over 50 films on cinema and TV.

== Biography ==
=== Background ===
Poppe's mother was unmarried and forced to place him with a Danish foster mother in Malmö, Sweden, who put him on a diet of bread dipped in beer. After two years he was rescued from her by Anders and Amanda Jönsson at Möllevången in Malmö, who became his foster parents. His theatrical dreams began to blossom early, and at school he showed off his comic talent.

On 1 August 1926, Poppe enlisted in the navy and trained as a torpedoman at the 1st Professional Company in Karlskrona as No. 427 Jönsson. However, the four-year enlistment period had to be prematurely terminated on 16 March 1928, likely due to a heart condition, which had shortly before resulted in 30 days of treatment at the Navy Hospital. Thereafter, he was not called up for military service, but he enlisted with number 936-2/1928. Nils Poppe attended Fridhems Folkhögskola in Svalöv from 1929 to 1930.

=== Early acting career ===
His career began with Oscar Winge at the Hippodrome Theatre (Malmö) in Malmö in 1930, arranged by the school rector. Initially he had his sights set on becoming a dramatic actor, but realised that he was better suited for comedy, revue, operetta and musical, especially as he also was a good dancer and singer, and decided to develop his comic streak. From the start he had a natural talent for dance and acrobatics, which he used for most of his career.

During his four years at the Hippodrome Theatre, he appeared in a wide range of revues and operettas, including The Green Pastures, Mutt and Jeff, and The Flower of Hawaii. During a tour with the operetta Mr. Cinders (1934), he was offered a role in Klangerevyn at the Folkets Hus theatre in Stockholm. Poppe accepted and became a resident of Stockholm for a long time to come. He quickly became an indispensable part of the Klangerevyn, demonstrating his acrobatic talents in sketches. He became famous and popular in the Stockholm entertainment scene. It was at the Folkets Hus theatre that he first performed his Charlie Chaplin parody. Nils Poppe was often compared to Chaplin; the similarities were many, although Poppe developed his own style over time.

In the 1940s, a new era in his career began when Poppe was hired by theatre director Gustaf Wally. Wally was known for his lavish productions and launched modern musical theatre. Poppe's definitive breakthrough came in the operetta Boys in Blue at Oscarsteatern in 1942. It was there that his long-standing collaboration with Annalisa Ericson and choreographer Albert Gaubier began. The Poppe-Ericson pair became a popular dance couple and were often compared to Ginger Rogers and Fred Astaire. Together they starred in the musical Me and My Girl at the Södra Teatern in Stockholm in 1947. The role of photographer Bill Snibson in Me and My Girl became a major role for Poppe; he played it a total of 1,040 times on various stages in Sweden, Finland and Denmark – wearing the same pair of trousers every time. In 1949, a film version was made entitled Greven från gränden.

=== Film career ===
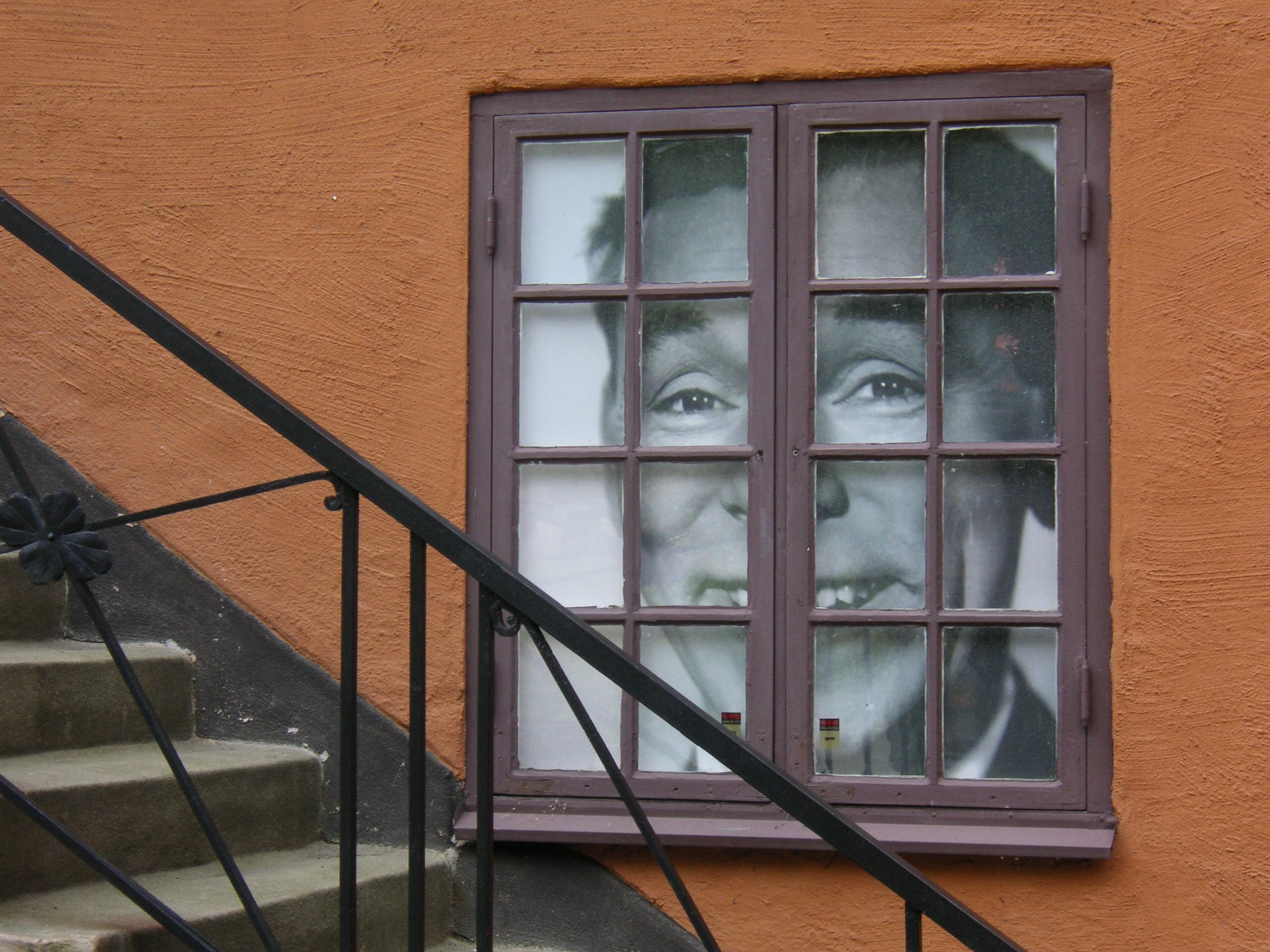
Picture of Nils Poppe at Filmstaden, Stockholm.

His film debut was in 1937, a modest role as a bear in the Adolf Jahr film Adolf Armstarke; a series of film comedies then followed, including Tre glada tokar, Tre skojiga skojare, Melodin från Gamla stan and Karusellen går.

In the 1940s Poppe became the country's leading film comedian. With Annalisa Ericson as his partner, he made comic dance films such as Don't give up and Stackars lilla Sven. He tried to combine his comic talent with seriousness and reflection in films such as Aktören (1943), Money (1946) and Ballongen (1946), which were artistic successes but not audience hits.

In 1948 the character Fabian Bom was born, the pedantic bully with the mustache, who became one of Poppe's most popular film characters. The first film, Soldat Bom, was a smash hit, running for 48 weeks in Stockholm cinemas. Seven Bom films were made, including Pappa Bom (1949), Customs Officer Bom (1951) and Flottans överman (1958). The Bom films were also international successes, and were particularly popular in Germany.

Another figure associated with Poppe is Sten Stensson Stéen, the Scanian student who knew all the law by heart. There were four comedy feature films with him as the main character.

Consequently, Ingmar Bergman's decision to cast Poppe in Ingmar Bergman's 1957 film The Seventh Seal as the joker Jof surprised many, but with that role Poppe showed that he could also convey much warmth and compassion. He would later appear in another Bergman film, The Devil's Eye (1960), playing a vicar.

=== Fredriksdalsteatern ===
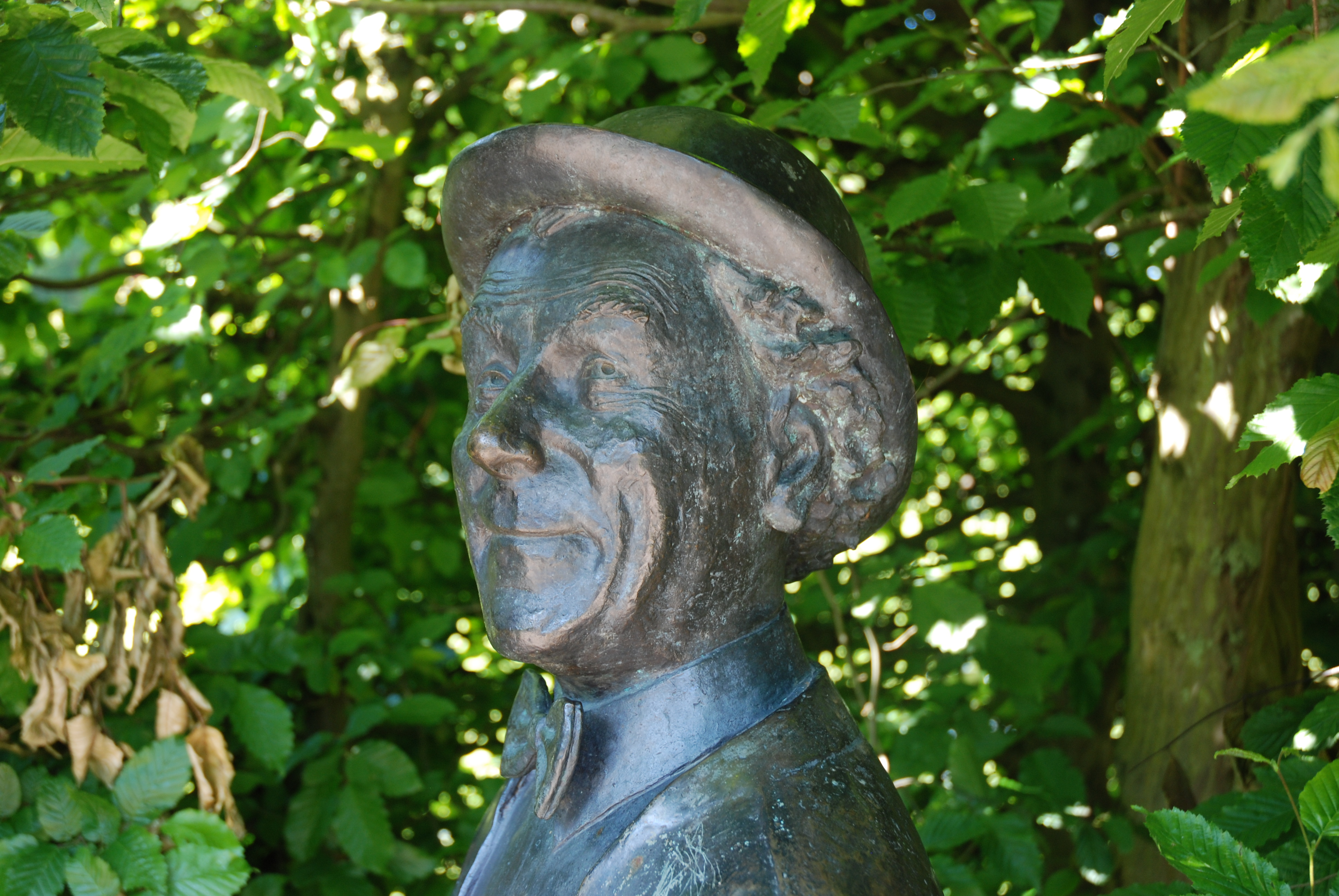
Nils Poppe (detail), by Jonas Högström, in Fredriksdalsparken in Helsingborg.

In the early 1960s, his career took a downturn. His desire to entertain disappeared and his popularity declined. His career was revived when he took over the open-air theatre Fredriksdalsteatern in Helsingborg in 1966 and returned to the stage. The first play was Charles Dyer's Rattle of a Simple Man and was the start of a long-lasting tradition. With operettas and farces such as Charley's Aunt, The White Horse Inn, Hooray, It's a Boy!, The Chaste Libertine and Meine Schwester und ich, he made the open-air theatre a national phenomenon. People flocked from all over Sweden to see Poppe, in rain or shine. When the plays began to be broadcast on Sveriges Television during Epiphany weekend, the audience numbers increased even more. In addition to his success at Fredriksdalsteatern, Poppe made guest appearances at Lisebergsteatern in Gothenburg, Maximteatern in Stockholm, and the city theatres in Helsingborg and Malmö. Particularly memorable is his Tevye in the musical Fiddler on the Roof at the Helsingborg City Theatre in 1979.

Throughout his career, Poppe was rather private. Just in time for his 80th birthday in 1988, he was persuaded by TV producer Bengt Roslund to appear in an interview series called Poppe i närbild ('Poppe close-up'). Many admired and marvelled at Poppe's vitality and mobility; at the age of 80 he could still perform small dance numbers on stage. He retired at the age of 85 and gave his last performance, Bröderna Östermans huskors, in 1993. He performed opposite Eva Rydberg, who later took over Fredriksdalteatern and continued it in Poppe's spirit.

Poppe's international stardom was proven as early as 1959, when the Royal National Theatre in London organised the 100 Clowns film comedy festival. Virtually every film comedian in history was represented with one of their works. It featured such greats as Harry Langdon, Buster Keaton, Harold Lloyd, Laurel and Hardy, Bob Hope, Peter Sellers, Danny Kaye and others. Among them was Nils Poppe, who was introduced as follows: "Sweden's greatest clown and comedian of the classic mould, which has affinities both with Chaplin and with Kaye".

=== Later years and private life ===
In his last few years Poppe declined quickly. He suffered several blood clots that took away his sight and speech, leaving him in a wheelchair. Poppe died in Helsingborg in 2000 and is buried in Allerum cemetery north of Helsingborg. His gravestone is adorned with an epitaph: "Say hello and tell them I'm in Allerum cemetery", something he often said when he felt tired in old age.

Nils Poppe was married twice; first to actress Inga Landgré (1949–1959), and then to actress Gunilla Poppe (née Sundberg) (1965–2000) who was 29 years younger than him. He had two children with each wife and three of them have become actors, like their parents.

Poppe lived from 1949 to 1967 in Danderyd, in a property that had previously been an inn and that is located along the old highway between Stockholm and Norrtälje. From 1968 until his death he lived in Domsten north of Helsingborg.

== Awards ==
From 1984 to 2001, the newspaper Svenska Dagbladet awarded the Poppe Prize, named after Nils Poppe, to actors involved in revue, musicals, and variety shows.

- 1974 – Årets skåning
- 1975 – Helsingborg medal
- 1976 – Swedish Theatre Critics Association Theatre Prize
- 1979 – Kvällsposten's EDVARD Prize
- 1982 – Karl Gerhards hederspris
- 1984 – Svenska Dagbladets Poppe Prize
- 1987 – H. M. The King's Medal, 8th size with bright blue ribbon
- 1987 – Litteris et Artibus
- 1987 – Lisebergsapplåden
- 1988 – Illis quorum, 8th size "for outstanding, exceptionally enduring and, in the best sense, popular acting work"
- 1988 – Årets skåning
- 1989 – Swedish Academy's theatre prize
- 1989 – Swedish Union for Performing Arts and Film's gold medal for "outstanding artistic achievement"
- 1990 – City of Malmö Culture Prize

== Partial filmography ==
- Adolf Strongarm (1937) - Skogens Konung (uncredited)
- Skicka hem nr. 7 (1937) - Undergraduate Blom
- Adolf i eld och lågor (1939) - Fireman Knutte
- Spöke till salu (1939) - Kirre
- Melodin från Gamla Stan (1939) - Nisse Karlsson, musician
- Kronans käcka gossar (1940) - 52 Nisse Ek
- ...som en tjuv om natten (1940) - Manager Svalling
- Karusellen går... (1940) - Nisse Lind
- Beredskapspojkar (1940) - Nisse Nyberg
- Tre glada tokar (1942) - Ruter
- Tre skojiga skojare (1942) - Fabian Lundegren, inventor
- Som fallen från skyarna (1943) - Dr. Baltazar
- Det spökar - det spökar... (1943) - Vikke Vire
- Det går som en dans... (1943) - Viktor Mattson
- Aktören (1943) - Philip Vinberg
- Sten Stensson kommer till stan (1945) - Sten Stensson Steen
- Blåjackor (1945) - Sgt. Kalle Svensson
- Pengar – en tragikomisk saga (1946) - Harry Orvar Larsson
- The Balloon (1946) - Sten Stensson Steen / Orvar Knatte / Yusuf / The King / Beppo
- Poor Little Sven (1947) - Sven Carlsson
- Don't Give Up (1947) - Pelle Olsson
- Private Bom (1948) - Fabian Bom
- Hur tokigt som helst (1949) - Mångsysslare
- Greven från gränden (1949) - Tiburtius Pettersson
- Father Bom (1949) - Fabian Bom
- Customs Officer Bom (1951) - Fabian Bom
- Livat på luckan (1951) - 52:an Nisse Ek
- Snurren direkt (1952) - Vicke Vire
- Bom the Flyer (1952)- Fabian Bom / Bom senior
- Dance, My Doll (1953) - Sebastian Pettersson
- Stupid Bom (1953) - Fabian Bom / Dumbom
- Uncle's (1955) - Patrik Palmquist
- The Light from Lund (1955) - Sten Stensson Steen
- The Biscuit (1956) - Valfrid, pickpocket
- The Seventh Seal (1957) - Jof / Joseph
- More Than a Match for the Navy (1958) - Fabian Bom
- Only a Waiter (1959) - Fabian Bom
- A Lion in Town (1959) - Charlie
- The Devil's Eye (1960) - The Vicar
- Sten Stensson Returns (1963) - Sten Stensson Steen
