= Number 17 (1949 film) =

1949 film

- Directed by: Gösta Stevens
- Screenplay by: Gösta Stevens
- Based on: Number 17 by Joseph Jefferson Farjeon
- Starring: Edvard Persson; George Fant; Mimi Nelson; Ulf Johanson
- Cinematography: Karl-Erik Alberts
- Edited by: Wic Kjellin
- Music by: Erik Baumann
- Distributed by: Europa Film
- Release date: 26 December 1949 (Sweden)
- Running time: 78 minutes
- Country: Sweden
- Language: Swedish

Number 17 (Swedish: Huset nr 17) is a 1949 Swedish crime film directed by Gösta Stevens and starring Edvard Persson, George Fant and Mimi Nelson. It was based on the 1925 play Number 17 by the British writer Joseph Jefferson Farjeon.

== Cast ==
- Edvard Persson as Calle Svensson
- George Fant as Bertil Frick
- Mimi Nelson as Rose
- Ulf Johanson as Henry
- Åke Fridell as Brandt
- Else-Marie Brandt as Vera Lindberg
- Björn Berglund as Lindberg
- Sture Ericson as Schmidt
- Arne Lindblad as Old Man
- Toivo Pawlo as Guest
- Stig Roland as Svärd
