= Hello Baby (1976 film) =

1976 film

- Directed by: Johan Bergenstråhle
- Written by: Marie-Louise De Geer Bergenstråhle
- Produced by: Bengt Forslund
- Starring: Marie-Louise De Geer Bergenstråhle
- Music by: Julius Jacobsen
- Release date: 28 January 1976
- Running time: 106 minutes
- Country: Sweden
- Language: Swedish

Hello Baby (Swedish: Hallo Baby) is a 1976 Swedish drama film directed by Johan Bergenstråhle and written by his then wife Marie-Louise Ekman. Toivo Pawlo won the award for Best Actor at the 12th Guldbagge Awards.

== Cast ==
- Marie-Louise De Geer Bergenstråhle as The Girl
- Anders Ek as Anders Ek
- Siv Ericks as The Girl's Mother
- Malin Gjörup as The Girl as child
- Manne Grünberger as Rabbi
- Nina Gunke as Leading Part
- Gerd Hagman as Journalist
- Keve Hjelm as Director
- Jan Molander as Director
- Toivo Pawlo as The Girl's Father
- Ulla Sallert as Actress
- Håkan Serner as The Girl's Ex-man
- Maria Lindberg as Sad girl (uncredited)
