= Fiancée for Hire =

1950 film

- Directed by: Gustaf Molander
- Written by: Susanne Palsbo (novel); Gösta Stevens
- Starring: Olof Winnerstrand; Karl-Arne Holmsten; Eva Dahlbeck
- Cinematography: Åke Dahlqvist
- Edited by: Oscar Rosander
- Music by: Ulf Peder Olrog
- Production company: Fribergs Filmbyrå AB
- Distributed by: Fribergs Filmbyrå AB
- Release date: 28 August 1950
- Running time: 91 minutes
- Country: Sweden
- Language: Swedish

Fiancée for Hire (Swedish: Fästmö uthyres) is a 1950 Swedish comedy film directed by Gustaf Molander and starring Olof Winnerstrand, Karl-Arne Holmsten and Eva Dahlbeck. It was shot at the Råsunda Studios in Stockholm. The film's sets were designed by the art director Nils Svenwall.

== Cast ==
- Olof Winnerstrand as Fredrik Winkler
- Karl-Arne Holmsten as Allan Winkler
- Eva Dahlbeck as Margit Berg
- Dagmar Ebbesen as Ms. Lauritz
- Elsa Carlsson as Mrs. Winkler
- Barbro Hiort af Ornäs as Gertrud Stenström
- Jan Molander as Mårtensson
- Marianne Löfgren as Mrs. Pålman
- Stig Järrel as Major Pålman
- Thor Modéen as The Colonel
- Gunnar Björnstrand as Actor Julius Brumse
- Douglas Håge as Boström
- Viveca Serlachius as Ann-Marie
- Carl-Olof Alm as Hellman
- Gull Natorp as Countess Rosenskiöld
- Hans Järrsten as Åke Winkler
- Sven-Axel Carlsson as Vike - Errand Boy

== Bibliography ==
- Qvist, Per Olov & von Bagh, Peter. Guide to the Cinema of Sweden and Finland. Greenwood Publishing Group, 2000.
