= Anna-Lisa Baude =

Swedish actress (1897–1968)

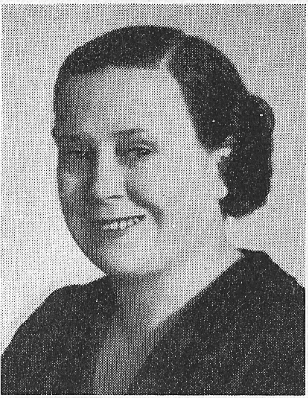
- Born: Anna Elisabeth Lundberg; 25 September 1897; Stockholm, Sweden
- Died: 7 June 1968 (aged 70); Stockholm, Sweden
- Occupation: Actress
- Years active: 1921–1968

Anna-Lisa Baude (born Anna Elisabeth Lundberg, 25 September 1897 – 7 June 1968) was a Swedish film actress. She appeared in 60 films between 1921 and 1968.

== Selected filmography ==
- The Girl in Tails (1926)
- Hotel Paradis (1931)
- Colourful Pages (1931)
- Tired Theodore (1931)
- The Love Express (1932)
- A Stolen Waltz (1932)
- Two Men and a Widow (1933)
- Melody of the Sea (1934)
- The Marriage Game (1935)
- Emilie Högquist (1939)
- Variety Is the Spice of Life (1939)
- The Crazy Family (1940)
- The Bjorck Family (1940)
- We're All Errand Boys (1941)
- How to Tame a Real Man (1941)
- In Paradise (1941)
- Lucky Young Lady (1941)
- We House Slaves (1942)
- Captured by a Voice (1943)
- Little Napoleon (1943)
- My People Are Not Yours (1944)
- Oss tjuvar emellan eller En burk ananas (1945)
- Motherhood (1945)
- Crisis (1946)
- Affairs of a Model (1946)
- Carnival Evening (1948)
- Love Wins Out (1949)
- My Sister and I (1950)
- Living on 'Hope' (1951)
- In Lilac Time (1952)
- Sju svarta be-hå (1954)
- Rätten att älska (1956)
- The Biscuit (1956)
