= Olav Riégo =

Swedish actor

- Riégo in 1912
- Born: 21 April 1891; Helsingfors, Finland
- Died: 25 December 1956 (aged 65); Stockholm, Sweden
- Occupation: Actor
- Years active: 1923–1956

Olav Riégo (21 April 1891 – 25 December 1956) was a Swedish film actor. He appeared in more than 90 films between 1923 and 1956. He starred in the film Leva på 'Hoppet', which won the Silver Bear (Comedies) award at the 1st Berlin International Film Festival.

== Selected filmography ==
- House Slaves (1923)
- Her Little Majesty (1925)
- Kalle Utter (1925)
- Charley's Aunt (1926)
- The False Millionaire (1931)
- Ship Ahoy! (1931)
- House Slaves (1933)
- The Marriage Game (1935)
- The People of Småland (1935)
- 65, 66 and I (1936)
- Poor Millionaires (1936)
- Adventure (1936)
- The Wedding Trip (1936)
- The Girls of Uppakra (1936)
- Conflict (1937)
- Happy Vestköping (1937)
- Good Friends and Faithful Neighbours (1938)
- A Cruise in the Albertina (1938)
- Emilie Högquist (1939)
- The Fight Continues (1941)
- Only a Woman (1941)
- Life Goes On (1941)
- How to Tame a Real Man (1941)
- Nothing Is Forgotten (1942)
- It Is My Music (1942)
- We House Slaves (1942)
- There's a Fire Burning (1943)
- Katrina (1943)
- Gentleman with a Briefcase (1943)
- Torment (1944)
- My People Are Not Yours (1944)
- His Majesty Must Wait (1945)
- Kristin Commands (1946)
- Brita in the Merchant's House (1946)
- Desire (1946)
- Affairs of a Model (1946)
- Dynamite (1947)
- The Night Watchman's Wife (1947)
- Lars Hård (1948)
- On These Shoulders (1948)
- Dangerous Spring (1949)
- Restaurant Intim (1950)
- The Quartet That Split Up (1950)
- The Kiss on the Cruise (1950)
- The Motor Cavaliers (1950)
- When Love Came to the Village (1950)
- Living on 'Hope' (1951)
- Customs Officer Bom (1951)
- In the Arms of the Sea (1951)
- My Name Is Puck (1951)
- Sköna Helena (1951)
- In Lilac Time (1952)
- Marianne (1953)
- The Road to Klockrike (1953)
- The Chieftain of Göinge (1953)
- Dance, My Doll (1953)
- The Shadow (1953)
- All the World's Delights (1953)
- The Girl from Backafall (1953)
- Uncle's (1955)
- The Light from Lund (1955)
- The Unicorn (1955)
- The Biscuit (1956)
- The Hard Game (1956)
- When the Mills are Running (1956)
- Mother Takes a Vacation (1957)
