= Julius Jacobsen =

Danish composer

- Born: 10 April 1915; Copenhagen, Denmark
- Died: 11 September 1990 (aged 75); Stockholm, Sweden
- Occupation: Composer
- Years active: 1945–1976 (film)

Julius Jacobsen (1915–1990) was a Danish composer.

== Selected filmography ==
- Don't Give Up (1947)
- Woman Without a Face (1947)
- The Kiss on the Cruise (1950)
- Customs Officer Bom (1951)
- Uncle's (1955)
- The Biscuit (1956)
- Hello Baby (1976)

== Bibliography ==
- Raphael Shargel, Ingmar Bergman: Interviews. Univ. Press of Mississippi, 2007.
