= Dance, My Doll =

1953 film

- Directed by: Martin Söderhjelm
- Written by: Paul Baudisch; Nils Poppe
- Produced by: Allan Ekelund
- Starring: Nils Poppe; Adolf Jahr; Inga Landgré
- Cinematography: Martin Bodin
- Edited by: Carl-Olov Skeppstedt
- Music by: Erik Nordgren
- Production company: Komiska Teatern
- Distributed by: Fribergs Filmbyrå
- Release date: 20 July 1953
- Running time: 86 minutes
- Country: Sweden
- Language: Swedish

Dance, My Doll (Swedish: Dansa, min docka) is a 1953 Swedish thriller comedy film directed by Martin Söderhjelm and starring Nils Poppe, Gunnar Björnstrand, Adolf Jahr and Inga Landgré. It was shot at the Råsunda Studios in Stockholm. The film's sets were designed by the art director Nils Svenwall.

The film premiered on 20 July 1953 at the Spegeln cinema in Stockholm. It has been shown several times on SVT, including 1991, 1994 and in January 2021.

== Cast ==
- Nils Poppe as Sebastian Pettersson
- Gunnar Björnstrand as Zdenko Zapatil
- Adolf Jahr as Albin Kvist
- Inga Landgré as Elise
- Kenne Fant as Holger
- Gull Natorp as Mrs. Uggla
- Märta Dorff as Hildur
- Dagmar Ebbesen as Mrs. Valldin
- Ragnvi Lindbladh as Lilly
- Henrik Schildt as Erik, gangster
- Börje Mellvig as Bertold
- Helge Hagerman as Svensson
- Fritiof Billquist as Svedje, Bertold's assistant
- Arne Lindblad as Tramp
- Paul Baudisch as Gustav Steneman
- Frithiof Bjärne as Policeman
- Tor Borong as Barbershop Customer
- Bengt Eklund as Lundvall - Engineer
- Gösta Ericsson as Supervisor
- Claes Esphagen as Gentleman
- Semmy Friedmann as Berg - Music Teacher
- Fritjof Hellberg as Policeman
- Gustaf Hiort af Ornäs as Prison Guard
- Stig Johanson as Worker
- Ingmar Karlsson as Firefighter
- Ragnar Klange as Butcher in Skrabbarp
- Carl-Uno Larsson as Boy with Stick
- Birger Lensander as Worker
- Curt Löwgren as Hairdresser
- Carl Nydahl as Policeman
- Olav Riégo as Wallgren
- Hilding Rolin as Man
- Erik Rosén as Irate Man with Dog
- Georg Skarstedt as Man Drinking Beer
- Åke Svensson as Hot Dog Vendor
- Bengt Thörnhammar as Worker
- Eric von Gegerfelt as Train Conductor

== Bibliography ==
- Qvist, Per Olov & von Bagh, Peter. Guide to the Cinema of Sweden and Finland. Greenwood Publishing Group, 2000.
