= Ulf Johanson =

Swedish actor (1922–1990)

- Born: Ulf Olav Johanson; 3 February 1922; Stockholm, Sweden
- Died: 15 February 1990 (aged 68); Stockholm, Sweden
- Occupation: Actor
- Years active: 1946–1987
- Spouse: Ingrid Borthen (m. 1948–1961)

Ulf Olav Johanson (also credited as Johnason and Johansson) (3 February 1922 in Stockholm – 15 February 1990 in Stockholm) was a Swedish actor. He won the Eugene O'Neill Award in 1983.

== Selected filmography ==
- Hans majestäts rival (1943) - Royal Guard (uncredited)
- Crisis (1946) - Piano Player (uncredited)
- Det glada kalaset (1946) - Policeman
- It Rains on Our Love (1946) - Stålvispen
- Music in Darkness (1948) - Man Waiting for Train (uncredited)
- Singoalla (1949) - Messenger on Horse (uncredited)
- Number 17 (1949) - Henry
- Regementets ros (1950) - Doctor
- She Came Like the Wind (1952) - Listmannen
- Bom the Flyer (1952) - Captain (uncredited)
- Barabbas (1953) - Josef from Arimatea (uncredited)
- The Road to Klockrike (1953) - Kvarvarande arbetslös svensk (uncredited)
- Bill Bergson and the White Rose Rescue (1953) - Peters
- Stupid Bom (1953) - Nilsson
- Our Father and the Gypsy (1954) - Axel Axelsson (uncredited)
- Hjälpsamma herrn (1954) - Larsson
- Taxi 13 (1954) - Quarrelsome Man
- Flicka utan namn (1954) - Granne
- Ung sommar (1954)
- Laugh Bomb (1954) - Police Commissioner
- Mord, lilla vän (1955) - Olle Sivert
- Smiles of a Summer Night (1955) - Legal Clerk (uncredited)
- The Light from Lund (1955) - Clergyman (uncredited)
- Night Child (1956) - Plain-clothes Policeman (uncredited)
- The Biscuit (1956) - Jacquetten (uncredited)
- The Seventh Seal (1957) - Knight Commander (uncredited)
- Mother Takes a Vacation (1957) - Jocke (uncredited)
- Wild Strawberries (1957) - Mr. Borg - Isak's Father (uncredited)
- You Are My Adventure (1958) - Professor (uncredited)
- The Jazz Boy (1958) - Belysningsmästaren på China
- Fröken Chic (1959) - Distrainer (uncredited)
- Swinging at the Castle (1959) - Sixten Fyltegård
- Heaven and Pancake (1959) - Alvar Sund
- Lyckodrömmen (1963) - Raskling
- Den gula bilen (1963) - Johansson
- Adam och Eva (1963) - Engineer
- Wild West Story (1964) - Doodle
- All These Women (1964) - Man in Black (uncredited)
- Loving Couples (1964) - Lawyer (uncredited)
- ...för vänskaps skull... (1965) - Editor-in-chief
- Hej du glada sommar!!! (1965) - Bror Väster
- Myten (1966) - Boman
- Adamsson i Sverige (1966) - Salvation Colonel Andersson
- Tofflan (1967) - Doctor
- Hour of the Wolf (1968) - Heerbrand
- Shame (1968) - Läkaren i förhörslokalen
- Het snö (1968) - Lasse
- Ett möte på Kretjetovkastationen (1970, TV Movie) - Tveritinov
- Den vita stenen (1973, TV Series) - Häradshövdingen
- A Handful of Love (1974) - Technical manager
- En enkel melodi (1974) - Felix's Father
- The Magic Flute (1975, TV Movie) - Andra prästen
- Face to Face (1976) - Helmuth Wankel
- Man måste ju leva... (1978) - Arvid
- Henrietta (1983) - Greven, markägare
- Sommarkvällar på jorden (1987) - Fredrik
