= Dangerous Spring =

1949 film by Arne Mattsson

- Directed by: Arne Mattsson
- Written by: Arne Mattsson; Rune Lindström
- Produced by: Harald Molander
- Starring: Karl-Arne Holmsten; Birger Malmsten; Jan Molander
- Cinematography: Gösta Roosling
- Edited by: Oscar Rosander
- Music by: Stig Rybrant
- Production company: Fribergs Filmbyrå
- Distributed by: Fribergs Filmbyrå
- Release date: 28 February 1949
- Running time: 96 minutes
- Country: Sweden
- Language: Swedish

Dangerous Spring (Swedish: Farlig vår) is a 1949 Swedish crime drama film directed by Arne Mattsson and starring Karl-Arne Holmsten, Birger Malmsten and Jan Molander. It was shot at the Råsunda Studios in Stockholm and on location in Uppsala. The film's sets were designed by the art director Nils Svenwall.

== Synopsis ==
After a prostitute is found murdered, suspicion seems to point towards a student.

== Cast ==
- Karl-Arne Holmsten as Jur. kand. Bo Hagberg
- Birger Malmsten as Med. kand. Torsten Hjertgren
- Jan Molander as Fil. stud. Robert Croona
- Stig Olin as Teol. stud. Gustaf Eriksson
- Åke Grönberg as Stud. (bara stud.) Karl Larsson
- Eva Stiberg as Med. kand. Berit Lange
- Inga Landgré as Tvålflickan Ulla
- Else-Merete Heiberg as Fackskoleflickan Maud
- Julia Cæsar as Heliga Birgitta
- Wiktor Andersson as Sjätte Budet
- Haide Göransson as Gullan Svan
- Björn Berglund as Criminal detective
- Ludde Juberg as Nilheim, vicar
- Olav Riégo as Professor of anatomy
- Artur Rolén a s Österholm
- John Melin as Customer in barber shop
- Victor Sjöström as Antikhandlare Bladh
- Börje Mellvig as Dr. Berg
- Sif Ruud as Tjinonan
- Hanny Schedin as Vendela
- Birger Åsander as Cathedral Janitor
- Arthur Fischer as Singing servant

== Bibliography ==
- Hjort, Mette & Lindqvist, Ursula. A Companion to Nordic Cinema. John Wiley & Sons, 2016.
- Qvist, Per Olov & von Bagh, Peter. Guide to the Cinema of Sweden and Finland. Greenwood Publishing Group, 2000.
