= When the Meadows Blossom =

1946 film

- Directed by: Hampe Faustman
- Written by: Jan Fridegård (novel); Hampe Faustman; Gösta Netzén
- Starring: Sigurd Wallén; Dagny Lind; Birger Malmsten
- Cinematography: Elner Åkesson
- Edited by: Lennart Wallén
- Music by: Erland von Koch
- Production company: Filmo
- Distributed by: Terrafilm
- Release date: 11 November 1946
- Running time: 77 minutes
- Country: Sweden
- Language: Swedish

When the Meadows Blossom (Swedish: När ängarna blommar) is a 1946 Swedish drama film co-written and directed by Hampe Faustman and starring Sigurd Wallén, Dagny Lind and Birger Malmsten. The film's sets were designed by the art director P.A. Lundgren.

== Cast ==
- Sigurd Wallén as Hellman
- Dagny Lind as Mrs. Hellman
- Birger Malmsten as Gunnar Hellman
- Ludde Gentzel as Nicklasson
- Elsa Widborg as Emma Nicklasson
- Doris Svedlund as Ester Nicklasson
- Åke Fridell as Emil Nicklasson
- Carl Ström as From
- Märta Arbin as Mrs. From
- Erik Hell as Stenström
- Hugo Björne as Squire
- Solveig Lagström as Squire's daughter
- Tord Stål as Berg
- Magnus Kesster as Lindstam
- Ivar Wahlgren as Andersson
- Sture Ericson as Svensson
- Hampe Faustman as Ville
- Bengt Eklund as Jonte

== Bibliography ==
- Sundholm, John . Historical Dictionary of Scandinavian Cinema. Scarecrow Press, 2012.
