= Poor Little Sven =

1947 Swedish comedy film

- Directed by: Hugo Bolander
- Written by: Rolf Botvid; Nils Poppe
- Based on: Mr. Cinders by Clifford Grey
- Produced by: Harald Molander
- Starring: Nils Poppe; Annalisa Ericson; Hjördis Petterson
- Cinematography: Gösta Roosling
- Edited by: Oscar Rosander
- Music by: Simon Brehm; Eskil Eckert-Lundin; Jerry Högstedt; Sven Gyldmark
- Production company: Fribergs Filmbyrå AB
- Release date: 24 February 1947
- Running time: 76 minutes
- Country: Sweden
- Language: Swedish

Poor Little Sven (Swedish: Stackars lilla Sven) is a 1947 Swedish comedy film directed by Hugo Bolander and starring Nils Poppe, Annalisa Ericson and Hjördis Petterson. The film's sets were designed by the art director Arne Åkermark. It was inspired by the plot of the 1928 British musical Mr. Cinders, which Poppe and Ericson had appeared together in on stage.

== Synopsis ==
Sven, an orphan, is taken care of by the generous Anton Carlsson. However, when Carlson marries a baroness he becomes the stepfather of her two mean-spirited sons who make Sven's life increasingly difficult. Due to a mistake the daughter of a wealthy man is mistaken for a housemaid and she and Sven fall in love.

== Cast ==
- Nils Poppe as Sven Carlsson
- Annalisa Ericson as Marianne Wennerberg
- Hjördis Petterson as Baroness Agata von Stråhle
- Douglas Håge as Anton Carlsson
- Åke Engfeldt as Clas-Göran von Stråhle
- Hilding Gavle as Wennerberg
- Marianne Gyllenhammar as Anna-Lisa Wennerberg
- Åke Jensen as Christer von Stråhle
- Elisaveta as Donna Lucia
- Carl-Gunnar Wingård as Policeman
- Julia Cæsar as Tilda, cook
- Helge Mauritz as Bengtsson
- Artur Rolén as Farmer
- Arne Lindblad as Policeman

== Bibliography ==
- Qvist, Per Olov & von Bagh, Peter. Guide to the Cinema of Sweden and Finland. Greenwood Publishing Group, 2000.
