= The Emperor of Portugallia (film) =

1944 film

- Directed by: Gustaf Molander
- Written by: Rune Lindström
- Based on: The Emperor of Portugallia by Selma Lagerlöf
- Produced by: Harald Molander
- Starring: Victor Sjöström; Gunn Wållgren; Karl-Arne Holmsten
- Cinematography: Gösta Roosling
- Edited by: Allan Ekelund; Oscar Rosander
- Music by: Lille Bror Söderlundh
- Production company: Svensk Filmindustri
- Distributed by: Svensk Filmindustri
- Release date: 26 December 1944
- Running time: 109 minutes
- Country: Sweden
- Language: Swedish

The Emperor of Portugallia (Swedish: Kejsarn av Portugallien) is a 1944 Swedish historical drama film directed by Gustaf Molander and starring Victor Sjöström, Gunn Wållgren and Karl-Arne Holmsten. It was shot at the Råsunda Studios in Stockholm and on location in the city's Old Town and the province of Värmland. The film's sets were designed by the art directors Nils Svenwall and Arne Åkermark. It is based on the 1914 novel of the same title by Selma Lagerlöf, which had previously been adapted into the 1925 American silent film The Tower of Lies.

== Cast ==
- Victor Sjöström as Jan i Skrolycka
- Gunn Wållgren as Klara Fina Gulleborg
- Karl-Arne Holmsten as August där Nol
- Hilda Borgström as Mor i Falla
- Olof Winnerstrand as Agrippa Prästberg
- Holger Löwenadler as Lars Gunnarsson
- Märta Ekström as Katrin
- Marianne Löfgren as Jenny
- Sture Lagerwall as Johan Agaton Holm
- Hugo Björne as Captain of Lübeck Ship
- Carl Ström as Erik i Falla
- Sten Lindgren as Member of Parliament
- Einar Axelsson as Lovén
- Erland Colliander as Börje
- Carl-Gunnar Wingård as Bergström
- Olof Sandborg as Swartling
- Carl Deurell as Captain
- Josua Bengtson as Vicar
- Gösta Bodin as Man at the brothel
- Eric Gustafson as Chef on the boat
- John Elfström as Farmer in the grocery store
- Birger Åsander as Boy in the grocery store
- Torsten Lilliecrona as Boy in the grocery store
- Axel Högel as Supervisor on the boat
- Erik Forslund as Party guest
- Anders Nyström as August aged 12

== Bibliography ==
- Qvist, Per Olov & von Bagh, Peter. Guide to the Cinema of Sweden and Finland. Greenwood Publishing Group, 2000.
- Steene, Birgitta. Ingmar Bergman: A Reference Guide. Amsterdam University Press, 2005.
