= Allan Ekelund =

Swedish film produce

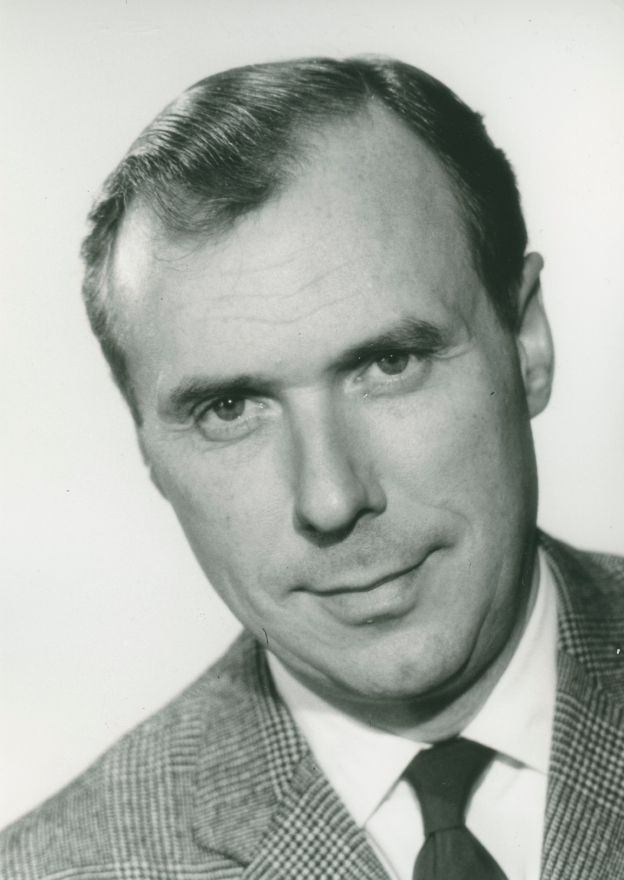
- Allan Ekelund (1963)
- Born: 16 January 1918; Örebro, Sweden
- Died: 4 September 2009 (aged 91); Vaxholm, Sweden
- Occupation: Film producer
- Years active: 1947–1964

Allan Ekelund (16 January 1918 – 4 September 2009) was a Swedish film producer. He produced 50 films between 1947 and 1964.

== Selected filmography ==
- The Emperor of Portugallia (1944)
- Father Bom (1949)
- To Joy (1950)
- The Kiss on the Cruise (1950)
- Summer Interlude (1951)
- Skipper in Stormy Weather (1951)
- Defiance (1952)
- Blondie, Beef and the Banana (1952)
- Secrets of Women (1952)
- Love (1952)
- Say It with Flowers (1952)
- Summer with Monika (1953)
- Dance, My Doll (1953)
- Hidden in the Fog (1953)
- No Man's Woman (1953)
- The Glass Mountain (1953)
- A Lesson in Love (1954)
- Smiles of a Summer Night (1955)
- Violence (1955)
- The Light from Lund (1955)
- The Biscuit (1956)
- The Hard Game (1956)
- Seventh Heaven (1956)
- The Song of the Scarlet Flower (1956)
- The Seventh Seal (1957)
- Night Light (1957)
- The Halo Is Slipping (1957)
- Encounters in the Twilight (1957)
- Wild Strawberries (1957)
- The Jazz Boy (1958)
- The Magician (1958)
- More Than a Match for the Navy (1958)
- Crime in Paradise (1959)
- Heaven and Pancake (1959)
- The Virgin Spring (1960)
- On a Bench in a Park (1960)
- Through a Glass Darkly (1961)
- Winter Light (1962)
- Siska (1962)
- The Mistress (1962)
- The Silence (1963)
- All These Women (1964)
