= Father Bom =

1949 film

- Directed by: Lars-Eric Kjellgren
- Written by: Paul Baudisch; Nils Poppe
- Produced by: Allan Ekelund
- Starring: Nils Poppe; Gunnar Björnstrand; Sif Ruud
- Cinematography: Martin Bodin
- Edited by: Oscar Rosander
- Music by: Eskil Eckert-Lundin; Jerry Högstedt
- Production company: Fribergs Filmbyrå AB
- Distributed by: Fribergs Filmbyrå
- Release date: 19 December 1949
- Running time: 90 minutes
- Country: Sweden
- Language: Swedish

Father Bom (Swedish: Pappa Bom) is a 1949 Swedish comedy film directed by Lars-Eric Kjellgren and starring Nils Poppe, Gunnar Björnstrand and Sif Ruud. The film's sets were designed by the art director Nils Svenwall. It was part of a series starring Poppe as Fabian Bom. A number of Swedish sports stars appeared as themselves.

== Cast ==
- Nils Poppe as Fabian Bom
- Gunnar Björnstrand as Fritjof Krafft
- Else-Merete Heiberg as Lena Brodin
- Sif Ruud as Adela Pettersson, änka
- Julia Cæsar as Euphemia Olsson
- Arne Lindblad as Anton Söderberg
- Nils Hallberg as Sprallis
- Rolf Botvid as Fimpen
- Georg Adelly as Puman
- Torsten Tegnér as Self
- Olle Tandberg as Self
- Henry Carlsson as Self
- Arne Andersson as Self
- Henry Kälarne as Self
- Åke Spångert as Self
- Åke Seyffarth as Self
- Margit Andelius as Skvallerkäring i buss
- Märta Arbin as Barnavårdslärare
- Helga Brofeldt as Skvallerkäring i buss
- Ernst Brunman as Trafikkonstapel Brakbälg
- Arthur Fischer as Värvare från Småköpings idrottsförening
- Sigge Fürst as Speaker vid idrottstävlingen
- Mona Geijer-Falkner as Hyresgäst
- Gustaf Lövås as Värvare från Lyckeby idrottsförening
- Hanny Schedin as Hulda Söderberg, Antons hustru
- Rune Stylander as Idrottsman

== Bibliography ==
- McIlroy, Brian. World Cinema: Sweden. Flicks Books, 1986.
- Qvist, Per Olov & von Bagh, Peter. Guide to the Cinema of Sweden and Finland. Greenwood Publishing Group, 2000.
