= Rail Workers =

1947 film

- Directed by: Arne Mattsson
- Written by: Rune Lindström; Gardar Sahlberg; Arne Mattsson
- Based on: Nordanvind by Olle Länsberg
- Produced by: Harald Molander
- Starring: Victor Sjöström; John Elfström; Gunnel Broström
- Cinematography: Martin Bodin
- Edited by: Oscar Rosander
- Music by: Sven Sköld
- Production company: Svensk Filmindustri
- Distributed by: Svensk Filmindustri
- Release date: 26 December 1947
- Running time: 108 minutes
- Country: Sweden
- Language: Swedish

Rail Workers (Swedish: Rallare) is a 1947 Swedish drama film directed by Arne Mattsson and starring Victor Sjöström, John Elfström and Gunnel Broström. It was shot at the Råsunda Studios in Stockholm. The film's sets were designed by the art director Nils Svenwall. It is based on the 1946 novel Nordanvind by Olle Länsberg.

== Synopsis ==
In 1902 a team of navvies work on the construction of a new railway line from Luleå on the Gulf of Bothnia in Northern Sweden to Narvik on the Norwegian Sea, then under Swedish sovereignty. Valfrid, from Southern Sweden, is ostracised by the other workers and their informal leader Stora Ballong.

== Cast ==
- Victor Sjöström as Stora Ballong
- John Elfström as Valfrid Andersson
- Gunnel Broström as Viktoria
- Åke Grönberg as Calle-Ville
- Inga Landgré as Hildur
- Sven Magnusson as Dynamiten
- Ingrid Borthen as Svarta Björn
- Bengt Eklund as Amos Forslund
- Svea Holst as Stina
- Axel Högel as Baptist-Anders
- Birger Åsander as Filip Bred
- Henake Schubak as Sikkavaara Frans
- Gösta Holmström as Bråk-Olle
- Sven Bergvall as Blom
- Kolbjörn Knudsen as Holmberg
- Einar Söderbäck as Söder
- Carl Deurell as King Oscar II
- Arthur Fischer as Langar-Oskar
- Martin Ljung as The King's adjutant
- Artur Rolén as Artilleri-Emil
- Keve Hjelm as Natan
- Ivar Wahlgren as Railroad watchman
- Tor Borong as Railroad worker

== Bibliography ==
- McIlroy, Brian. World Cinema: Sweden. Flicks Books, 1986.
- Qvist, Per Olov & von Bagh, Peter. Guide to the Cinema of Sweden and Finland. Greenwood Publishing Group, 2000.
