= Crisis (1946 film) =

1946 film by Ingmar Bergman

- Theatrical release poster
- Directed by: Ingmar Bergman
- Screenplay by: Ingmar Bergman
- Based on: Moderhjertet by Leck Fischer
- Produced by: Harald Molander; Victor Sjöström
- Starring: Inga Landgré; Stig Olin; Marianne Löfgren; Dagny Lind; Allan Bohlin; Ernst Eklund; Signe Wirff
- Cinematography: Gösta Roosling
- Edited by: Oscar Rosander
- Music by: Erland von Koch
- Distributed by: Svensk Filmindustri
- Release date: 25 February 1946
- Running time: 93 minutes
- Country: Sweden
- Language: Swedish

Crisis (Swedish: Kris) is a 1946 Swedish melodrama film written and directed by Ingmar Bergman (in his directorial debut), based on the Danish radio play Moderhjertet (translated as The Mother Animal, A Mother's Heart, The Mother Creature, and The Maternal Instinct) by Leck Fischer.

== Plot ==
The story follows a young girl living a quiet life in a small town with her foster mother. Nelly is an innocent 18-year-old becoming increasingly aware of the effect that her beauty has on the men of her little Swedish village. Ingeborg is a respectably dour woman who teaches piano to village youth and runs a rooming house, and has undoubtedly sacrificed much for the sake of her foster daughter. With Nelly on the verge of womanhood and Ingeborg in failing health, Nelly's biological mother, Miss Jenny, returns in her fancy hat, painted nails and trampy air of sophistication to take her long-abandoned daughter away to sample the indulgent fruits of urban life.

Jenny has had a rough past, involving prostitution and other scandals, but now owns a beauty salon which affords her a few comforts in life, material and otherwise. Among them is a dapper mustachioed gentleman acquaintance named Jack, who follows Jenny to the village as an uninvited guest. Jenny's purpose in coming was to meet up with Nelly at a charity ball, and when Jack learns about the event he's more than happy to inject more liveliness into the affair than the village elders had in mind. Nelly and Jack leave the ball, which has descended into chaos due to Jack's antics, and kiss passionately at the lakeside at night. Nelly's admirer, Ulf, who rents a room from Ingeborg, catches the two together, whereupon he humiliates Jack and tosses him off a dock into the lake.

Nelly, conflicted about leaving Ingeborg (her beloved "Mutti"), decides after the scandal to leave with Jenny and Jack to go to the city. There, she works in her mother's salon, where she acquires her own air of urban sophistication as well as numerous friends in the city. Ingeborg and Ulf are saddened, but Ingeborg tells him they must wait while Nelly goes through the experience. While in the city, Jack seduces Nelly by telling her that he previously murdered his pregnant wife and child while they slept, by turning up the gas then claiming it was an accident. Nelly's heart is softened by the story and agrees to accompany him to the police station, but first they fall into each other's arms, and indulge in romantic embrace. Jenny catches the two of them in bed, and reveals that Jack never murdered his family – it is a story he tells to entice women. Jack angrily leaves and shortly after shoots himself off-screen. Nelly, shocked and disillusioned by city life, returns to her hometown and reunites with Ingeborg and Ulf. At the film's close, village life has returned to the calm normalcy of the opening scenes, though now with a relationship between Nelly and Ulf beginning to develop.

== Cast ==
(in alphabetical order)

- Wiktor Andersson – Musician
- Anna-Lisa Baude – Customer
- Allan Bohlin – Ulf
- Julia Cæsar – The Mayor's wife
- Gus Dahlström – Musician
- Ernst Eklund – Uncle Edvard
- Sture Ericson – Musician
- Karl Erik Flens – Nelly's escort
- Holger Höglund – Musician
- Svea Holst – Malin
- Ulf Johanson – Musician
- Inga Landgré – Nelly
- Arne Lindblad – The Mayor
- Dagny Lind – Ingeborg
- Marianne Löfgren – Jenny
- John Melin – Musician
- Stig Olin – Jack
- Dagmar Olsson – Singer
- Signe Wirff – Aunt Jessie
