= Oss tjuvar emellan eller En burk ananas =

- Directed by: Olof Molander
- Written by: Helge Krog
- Produced by: Harald Molander
- Starring: Lauritz Falk; Karin Ekelund; Allan Bohlin; Stig Järrel; Erik Berglund; Ludde Gentzel
- Cinematography: Martin Bodin
- Edited by: Oscar Rosander
- Music by: Dag Wirén
- Production company: AB Svensk Filmindustri
- Release date: January 22, 1945
- Running time: 96 minutes
- Country: Sweden

Oss tjuvar emellan eller En burk ananas (lit. 'Just among Us Thieves, or A Can of Pineapples') is a Swedish comedy film from 1945 directed by Olof Molander. The script was written by the Norwegian writer Helge Krog and the music composed by Dag Wirén.

The film was shot at Filmstaden studios in Råsunda in the summer of 1944. It had its Swedish premiere at the Spegeln cinema in Stockholm on January 22, 1945.

== Plot ==
Max Kvarne, who considers himself a kind of modern Robin Hood, hides £25,000 from a theft in London in a pineapple can. He travels back with it home to Stockholm. However, the police track him down and send out a detective, Arvid Zinder, to arrest him. Arvid is an old childhood friend of Max, and he has also been in love with his fiancée Irma for a long time. A lawyer, Barman, offers to become Max's defense lawyer, but his motive is really anything but noble. Barman goes to the stingy drug addict Daniel Bondsack's home, where Irma and Max have rented a room and where he thinks the money is hidden, to search the house. However, nobody knows where the pineapple can is anymore.

== Cast ==
- Lauritz Falk as Max Kvarne
- Karin Ekelund as Irene Brambani
- Allan Bohlin as Arvid Zinder
- Stig Järrel as Barman the lawyer
- Ludde Gentzel as Daniel Bondsack
- Erik Berglund as the detective
- Anna-Lisa Baude as Baroness Adelstolpe
- Elsa Widborg as Mrs. Bondsack
- Hilding Gavle as Költzow
- Douglas Håge as Detective Fransson
- Nils Johannisson as Chief Detective Mattsson
- Josua Bengtson as the plumber
- Carl Ström as a blacksmith at the beer café
- Åke Egnell as Olle, a student on the train
- Olof Bergström as Gustav, Olle's friend
- Stig Olin as Gustav, a young worker
- Erik Forslund as an old worker at the beer café
- Olof Krook as a cleaning worker
- Erik Hell as Nisse, a sailor
- Eva Dahlbeck as Astrid, his girlfriend
- John Elfström as Constable Söder
- Hartwig Fock as a taxi driver
- Helge Andersson as a taxi driver
- Helge Mauritz as the taxi driver at the police station
- Wiktor Andersson as a garbage man at the dump
