= Nils Svenwall =

Swedish art director (1918–2005)

- Born: 7 October 1918; Borås, Västra Götalands län, Sweden
- Died: 5 April 2005 (aged 86); Lidingö, Stockholms län, Sweden
- Occupation: Art director
- Years active: 1942-1983 (film)

Nils Svenwall (1918–2005) was a Swedish art director.

== Selected filmography ==
- Ride Tonight! (1942)
- Night in Port (1943)
- Little Napoleon (1943)
- The Old Clock at Ronneberga (1944)
- The Emperor of Portugallia (1944)
- His Majesty Must Wait (1945)
- Man's Woman (1945)
- The Journey Away (1945)
- Evening at the Djurgarden (1946)
- Kristin Commands (1946)
- The Balloon (1946)
- Don't Give Up (1947)
- How to Love (1947)
- Rail Workers (1947)
- The Girl from the Marsh Croft (1947)
- Life at Forsbyholm Manor (1948)
- Private Bom (1948)
- A Swedish Tiger (1948)
- Port of Call (1948)
- Father Bom (1949)
- Love Wins Out (1949)
- Dangerous Spring (1949)
- Woman in White (1949)
- Fiancée for Hire (1950)
- The Quartet That Split Up (1950)
- The Kiss on the Cruise (1950)
- Two Stories Up (1950)
- Beef and the Banana (1951)
- Customs Officer Bom (1951)
- Skipper in Stormy Weather (1951)
- Blondie, Beef and the Banana (1952)
- Say It with Flowers (1952)
- Bom the Flyer (1952)
- Love (1952)
- Defiance (1952)
- Encounter with Life (1952)
- Dance, My Doll (1953)
- Dance in the Smoke (1954)

== Bibliography ==
- Cowie, Peter. Swedish Cinema. Zwemmer, 1966.
