= Woman in White (film) =

1949 film

- Directed by: Arne Mattsson
- Written by: Oscar Hemberg; Rune Lindström
- Based on: Herzen in der Klinik novel by Rudolf Eger
- Produced by: Harald Molander
- Starring: Margareta Fahlén; Georg Løkkeberg; Eva Dahlbeck
- Cinematography: Åke Dahlqvist
- Edited by: Oscar Rosander
- Music by: Håkan von Eichwald
- Production company: Svensk Filmindustri
- Distributed by: Fribergs Filmbyrå
- Release date: 5 September 1949
- Running time: 87 minutes
- Country: Sweden
- Language: Swedish

Woman in White (Swedish: Kvinna i vitt) is a 1949 Swedish drama film directed by Arne Mattsson and starring Margareta Fahlén, Georg Løkkeberg and Eva Dahlbeck. It was shot at the Råsunda Studios in Stockholm and on location in the city. The film's sets were designed by the art director Nils Svenwall. It is unconnected with the Wilkie Collins novel The Woman in White.

== Synopsis ==
Doctor Karin Lange arrives at a hospital to begin work but faces opposition from the head of surgery who believes women are not suited to the medical profession.

== Cast ==
- Margareta Fahlén as Dr. Karin Lange
- Georg Løkkeberg as Prof. Borenius
- Eva Dahlbeck as Solveig Rygård
- Karl-Arne Holmsten as Dr. Jan Lindquist
- Holger Löwenadler as Dr. Bo Wallgren
- Sigge Fürst as Boman
- Barbro Nordin as Nurse Aina
- Julia Cæsar as Clara Clarin
- Artur Rolén as Hampling
- John Melin as Algotson
- Marianne Löfgren as Mrs. Blom
- Ludde Juberg as Alfred Blom
- Mimi Nelson as Olga Lindberg
- Aurore Palmgren as Miss Andersson
- Georg Skarstedt as Alm
- Magnus Kesster as Dr. Åhman
- Saga Sjöberg as Lilli Wallgren
- Monica Weinzierl as Barbro

== Bibliography ==
- Qvist, Per Olov & von Bagh, Peter. Guide to the Cinema of Sweden and Finland. Greenwood Publishing Group, 2000.
