= Åke Dahlqvist =

Swedish cinematographer (1901–1991)

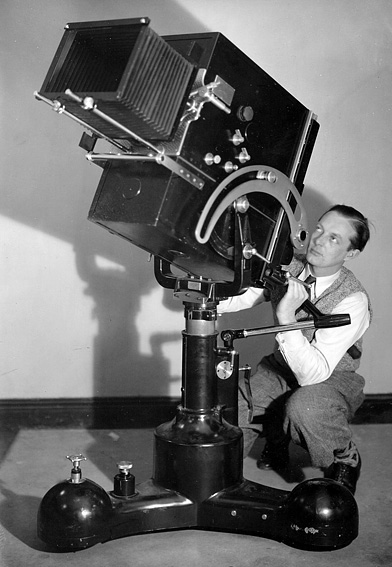
- Åke Dahlqvist, c. 1930s, with a Debrie Parvo Model T camera
- Born: 11 January 1901; Hallsberg, Sweden
- Died: 19 June 1991 (aged 90); Skanör, Sweden
- Occupation: Cinematographer
- Years active: 1925 - 1972 (film)

Åke Dahlqvist (1901–1991) was a Swedish cinematographer who worked on around a hundred films during his career.

== Selected filmography ==
- Ingmar's Inheritance (1925)
- The Red Day (1931)
- Skipper's Love (1931)
- Colourful Pages (1931)
- Tired Theodore (1931)
- Dante's Mysteries (1931)
- Servant's Entrance (1932)
- His Life's Match (1932)
- Black Roses (1932)
- Lucky Devils (1932)
- Dear Relatives (1933)
- Andersson's Kalle (1934)
- The Marriage Game (1935)
- The Family Secret (1936)
- Intermezzo (1936)
- Russian Flu (1937)
- John Ericsson, Victor of Hampton Roads (1937)
- Dollar (1938)
- A Woman's Face (1938)
- June Nights (1940)
- We're All Errand Boys (1941)
- The Fight Continues (1941)
- Tonight or Never (1941)
- Ride Tonight! (1942)
- There's a Fire Burning (1943)
- Dolly Takes a Chance (1944)
- The Invisible Wall (1944)
- The Gallows Man (1945)
- Johansson and Vestman (1946)
- Affairs of a Model (1946)
- Kristin Commands (1946)
- Woman Without a Face (1947)
- How to Love (1947)
- Eva (1948)
- I Am with You (1948)
- The Swedish Horseman (1949)
- Love Wins Out (1949)
- Woman in White (1949)
- The Quartet That Split Up (1950)
- Fiancée for Hire (1950)
- The Kiss on the Cruise (1950)
- Beef and the Banana (1951)
- Love (1952)
- Defiance (1952)
- No Man's Woman (1953)
- The Glass Mountain (1953)
- The Light from Lund (1955)
- Violence (1955)
- The Staffan Stolle Story (1956)
- Seventh Heaven (1956)
- The Song of the Scarlet Flower (1956)
- Night Light (1957)
- A Goat in the Garden (1958)
- Summer and Sinners (1960)

== Bibliography ==
- Chandler, Charlotte. Ingrid: Ingrid Bergman, A Personal Biography. Simon and Schuster, 2007.
