= Affairs of a Model =

1946 film directed by Gustaf Molander

- Directed by: Gustaf Molander
- Written by: Tor Hedberg (play); Rune Lindström
- Starring: Maj-Britt Nilsson; Alf Kjellin; Olof Winnerstrand
- Cinematography: Åke Dahlqvist
- Edited by: Oscar Rosander
- Music by: Eskil Eckert-Lundin
- Production company: Svensk Filmindustri
- Distributed by: Svensk Filmindustri
- Release date: 23 September 1946
- Running time: 104 minutes
- Country: Sweden
- Language: Swedish

Affairs of a Model (Swedish: Det är min modell) is a 1946 Swedish comedy film directed by Gustaf Molander and starring Maj-Britt Nilsson, Alf Kjellin and Olof Winnerstrand. It was shot at the Råsunda Studios in Stockholm. The film's sets were designed by the art director Arne Åkermark.

== Cast ==
- Maj-Britt Nilsson as Dora Svensson
- Alf Kjellin as Erik Lunde
- Olof Winnerstrand as Svante Piehl
- Stig Järrel as Consul-general Redel
- Oscar Winge as Filip Gregersson
- Marianne Löfgren as Vera Lund
- Anna-Lisa Baude as Svea Ohlsson
- Georg Funkquist as Allan Rune
- Wiktor Andersson as Johansson
- Margot Ryding as Countess Agatha von Sommerfeldt
- Olav Riégo as Bishop Ekkvist
- Ernst Brunman as Håkansson, communist editor
- Sven Bergvall as Gen. Leijonflycht
- Artur Rolén as Master of ceremonies
- Inga Gill as Waitress at Gyldene Tunnan

== Bibliography ==
- Qvist, Per Olov; von Bagh, Peter (2000). Guide to the Cinema of Sweden and Finland. Greenwood Publishing Group.
