= The Balloon =

1946 film

- Directed by: Göran Gentele; Nils Poppe
- Written by: Nils Poppe; Gardar Sahlberg; John Wigforss
- Produced by: Harald Molander
- Starring: Nils Poppe; Marianne Löfgren; Ingrid Borthen; Inga Landgré
- Cinematography: Martin Bodin
- Edited by: Oscar Rosander
- Music by: Sune Waldimir
- Production company: Svensk Filmindustri
- Distributed by: Svensk Filmindustri
- Release date: 7 October 1946
- Running time: 100 minutes
- Country: Sweden
- Language: Swedish

The Balloon (Swedish: Ballongen) is a 1946 Swedish comedy film directed by Göran Gentele and Nils Poppe and starring Poppe, Marianne Löfgren, Ingrid Borthen and Inga Landgré. The film's sets were designed by the art directors Nils Svenwall and Arne Åkermark. It was the second in a series of films feature Poppe in the role of Sten Stensson.

== Main cast ==
- Nils Poppe as Sten Stensson Stéen / Orvar Knatte / Yusuf / Kungen / Beppo
- Marianne Löfgren as Gunlög
- Marianne Gyllenhammar as Scheherazade
- Ingrid Borthen as Drottningen
- Inga Landgré as Rosita
- Marianne Aminoff as Vanda Nowak
- Ulla Norgren as Majken
- Ellen Halvorsen as Dansös
- Oscar Winge as Kosmos
- Arne Lindblad as Torbjörn Tvärvigg
- Sigge Fürst as Jerker Lemmalytt
- Benkt-Åke Benktsson as Kalifen
- Hilding Gavle as Storvisiren
- Erik Hell as Älskaren
- Stig Olin as Michael Kollinsky

== Bibliography ==
- Klossner, Michael. The Europe of 1500-1815 on Film and Television: A Worldwide Filmography of Over 2550 Works, 1895 Through 2000. McFarland, 2002.
- Qvist, Per Olov & von Bagh, Peter. Guide to the Cinema of Sweden and Finland. Greenwood Publishing Group, 2000.
