= Inga Landgré =

Swedish actress (1927–2023)

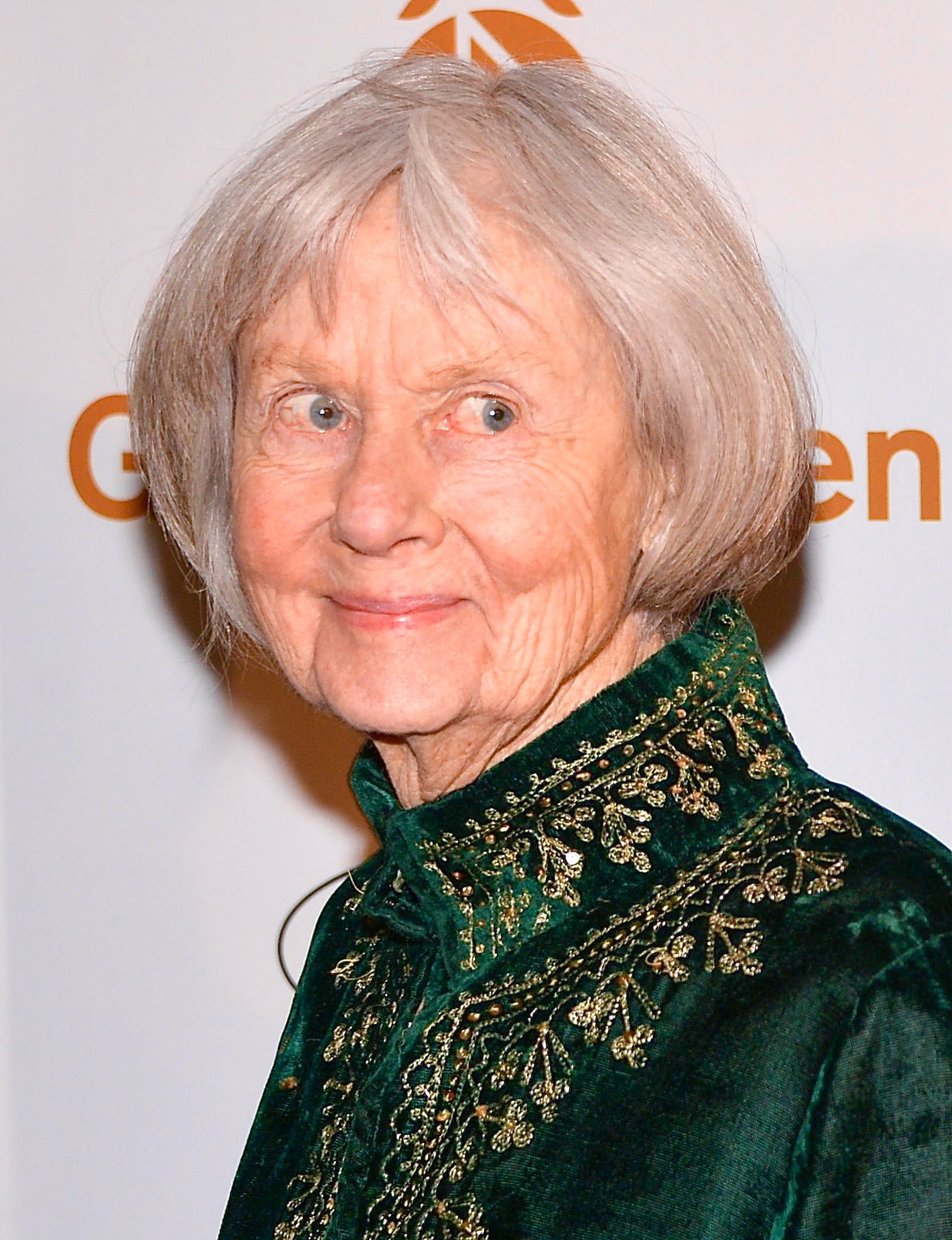
- Landgré in 2013
- Born: Inga Linnéa Lundgren; 6 August 1927; Stockholm, Sweden
- Died: 31 July 2023 (aged 95); Norberg, Sweden
- Occupation: Actress
- Years active: 1943–2023
- Spouse: Nils Poppe (m. 1949–1959)
- Partner: Roger Björnstjerna (1982–2006)

Inga Linnéa Lundgren (6 August 1927 – 31 July 2023), known professionally as Inga Landgré, was a Swedish actress who worked in theatre, television, and films from the 1940s on.

== Early life and career ==
Inga Landgré was born in Stockholm on 6 August 1927. Her father was a struggling musician whose alcoholism strained her parents' marriage. Her mother was a waitress. They divorced in the early 1930s, when Landgré was only five years old. She was an only child. She received her theatrical education at Calle Flygare Teaterskola and made her acting debut in 1944 at the Blanche Theatre as Anya in the Anton Chekhov play The Cherry Orchard.

Landgré started appearing in motion pictures around this time as well, starting with the 1943 film Ordet. In 1946, she starred in Crisis, Ingmar Bergman's directorial debut.

== Personal life and death ==
Landgré was married to the Swedish actor Nils Poppe between 1949 and 1959. The couple had two children together, of whom one also became an actress. In the 1960s, she acted as a courier for her friend Andreas Papandreou, who later became the prime minister of Greece, by delivering microfilm to Greece.

Inga Landgré died on 31 July 2023, at the age of 95.

== Awards and honours ==
Landgré won the Guldbagge Honorary Award in 2011, but received it in January 2012.

== Selected filmography ==
Year	Title	Role
1945	The Rose of Tistelön	Josefine
1946	Crisis	Nelly
1946	Pengar – en tragikomisk saga	Maria Bergdahl
1946	Sunshine Follows Rain	Barbro
1946	The Balloon	Rosita
1946	While the Door Was Locked	Birgit Ström
1947	Rail Workers	Hildur
1947	Wedding Night	Mary
1948	Eva	Frida
1948	Private Bom	Agnes
1949	Dangerous Spring	Ulla
1950	While the City Sleeps	Iris Lindström
1950	The Quartet That Split Up	Märta Åvik
1951	Customs Officer Bom	Frida
1952	Bom the Flyer	Matilda
1953	Stupid Bom	Camilla
1953	Dance, My Doll	Elise
1955	Dreams	Mrs. Lobelius
1956	Det är aldrig för sent	
1957	The Seventh Seal	Karin
1957	Encounters in the Twilight	Alice Wiegel
1957	A Dreamer's Journey	Ziri Stuart
1958	Brink of Life	Greta Ellius
1958	We at Väddö	Berit Sundberg
1967	Hugo and Josephine	Josephine's mother
1968	The Corridor	The mother
1977	Summer Paradise	Saga
1997	In the Presence of a Clown (TV film)	Alma Berglund
2003	Tur & retur	Greta
2011	The Girl With the Dragon Tattoo	Isabella
2015	Holy Mess	Gun-Britt
