= It Is My Music =

1942 film by Börje Larsson

- Directed by: Börje Larsson
- Written by: Börje Larsson
- Produced by: Börje Larsson
- Starring: Nils Kihlberg; Eva Henning; Sigurd Wallén
- Cinematography: Gunnar Fischer
- Edited by: Oscar Rosander
- Music by: Gunnar Johansson; Jules Sylvain
- Production company: Svensk Filmindustri
- Distributed by: Svensk Filmindustri
- Release date: 14 September 1942
- Running time: 92 minutes
- Country: Sweden
- Language: Swedish

It Is My Music (Swedish: Det ar min musik) is a 1942 Swedish comedy film directed by Börje Larsson and starring Nils Kihlberg, Eva Henning and Sigurd Wallén. Larsson also wrote the script. The film was shot at the Råsunda Studios in Stockholm. The sets were designed by the art director Arne Åkermark.

== Cast ==
- Nils Kihlberg as Jan-Erik Wallbo
- Eva Henning as Inga Bergius
- Sigurd Wallén as Lars Bergius
- Irma Christenson as Maud Welander
- Ernst Eklund as Georg Welander
- Lasse Dahlquist as Macce Bergius
- Eric Abrahamsson as Anders Wirén
- Carl Ström as Prof. Qvist
- Anders Frithiof as Prof. Hammarberg
- Rune Halvarsson as Sture Gylling
- Jullan Kindahl as Mrs. Johansson
- Einar Axelsson as Ragnar
- Olav Riégo as Secretary
- Ragnar Widestedt as Clerk in Concert hall
- Ingemar Holde as Jocke
- Gunnar Ekwall as Pråmen
- Ann-Margret Bergendahl as Guest at party
- Gösta Bodin as Oskarsson
- Rolf Botvid as Man in dance saloon
- Gard Cederborg as Miss Hallgren
- Ingrid Envall as Guest at party
- Gösta Grip as Gentleman
- Gustaf Hedström as Man in audience
- Egil Holmsen as Guest at party
- Marianne Lenard as Guest
- Gerd Mårtensson as Britta
- Dagmar Olsson as Lady in store
- Charley Paterson as Caretaker
- Willy Peters as Birger, sculptor
- Bellan Roos as Waitress
- Erik Rosén as Doctor
- Hanny Schedin as Miss Lindkvist
- Anna-Lisa Söderblom as Guest
- Gustaf Torrestad as Young Man
- James Westheimer as Man

== Bibliography ==
- Qvist, Per Olov & von Bagh, Peter. Guide to the Cinema of Sweden and Finland. Greenwood Publishing Group, 2000.
