= The Crazy Family (1940 film) =

1940 film

- Directed by: Ivar Johansson
- Written by: Wilhelm Lichtenberg (play); Torsten Lundqvist; Sven Zetterström
- Starring: Thor Modéen; Elsa Carlsson; Åke Söderblom
- Cinematography: Elner Åkesson
- Edited by: Oscar Rosander
- Music by: Lasse Dahlquist; Gunnar Johansson
- Production company: Wivefilm
- Distributed by: Wivefilm
- Release date: 19 August 1940
- Running time: 106 minutes
- Country: Sweden
- Language: Swedish

The Crazy Family (Swedish: Snurriga familjen) is a 1940 Swedish comedy film directed by Ivar Johansson and starring Thor Modéen, Elsa Carlsson and Åke Söderblom. It was shot at the Råsunda Studios in Stockholm. The film's sets were designed by the art director Arne Åkermark.

It marked the film debut of the future star Viveca Lindfors.

== Synopsis ==
The Bloms were rolling in dough before they fall on adversity. Each family member must now show that they can hold their own without the family's money and connections.

== Cast ==
- Thor Modéen as Direktör Blom
- Elsa Carlsson as Fru Laura Blom
- Åke Söderblom as Unge herr Blom
- Eivor Landström as Fröken Blom
- Allan Bohlin as John
- Annalisa Ericson as Fröken Stålhammar
- Eric Abrahamsson as Portier Svensson
- Carl Barcklind s Direktör Bergsten
- Åke Engfeldt as Direktör Rosén
- Viveca Lindfors as Lisa
- Carin Swensson as Restaurant Guest
- Anna-Lisa Baude as Emilia Orre
- Viran Rydkvist as Cook
- Elsa Ebbesen as Mrs. Pihl
- Ingrid Foght as Hotel Guest
- Maj-Britt Håkansson as Hotel Guest
- John Botvid as Pettersson
- Rolf Botvid as Göran Welander
- Artur Cederborgh as Night Porter
- Ragnar Widestedt as Broden
- Artur Rolén as Nilsson
- Arne Lindblad as Hotel Guest
- Bertil Unger as Hotel Guest / Dancer
- Gustaf Unger as Hotel Guest / Dancer

== Bibliography ==
- Qvist, Per Olov & von Bagh, Peter. Guide to the Cinema of Sweden and Finland. Greenwood Publishing Group, 2000.
