= Rolf Botvid =

Swedish actor and writer

- Born: 26 December 1915; Gothenburg, Sweden
- Died: 22 July 1998 (aged 82); Benidorm, Spain
- Other name: Rolf Hakon Börjesson
- Occupations: Actor, writer
- Years active: 1934–1963

Rolf Botvid (26 December 1915 – 22 July 1998) was a Swedish actor and screenwriter. He appeared in over 30 films. He was the son of actor and comedian John Botvid and was married to actress Marianne Gyllenhammar.

== Selected filmography ==
- The Atlantic Adventure (1934)
- Under falsk flagg (1935)
- På Solsidan (1936)
- Conscientious Objector Adolf (1936)
- 65, 66 and I (1936)
- Kungen kommer (1936)
- Klart till drabbning (1937)
- Happy Vestköping (1937)
- Comrades in Uniform (1938)
- For Better, for Worse (1938)
- Beredskapspojkar (1940)
- The Crazy Family (1940)
- How to Tame a Real Man (1941)
- It Is My Music (1942)
- Kungsgatan (1943)
- Anna Lans (1943)
- Poor Little Sven (1947)
- Father Bom (1949)
- The Biscuit (1956)
- More Than a Match for the Navy (1958)
- Sten Stensson Returns (1963)
