= Martin Bodin =

Swedish cinematographer

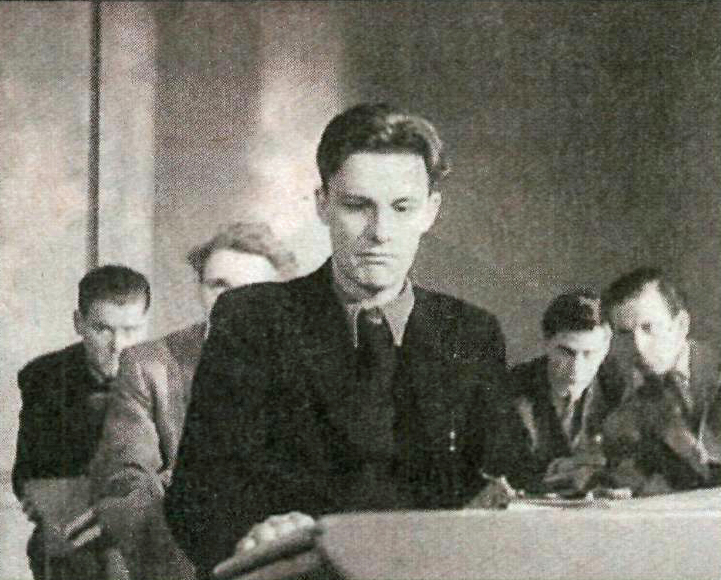
Alf Kjellin as high school student Jan-Erik in Alf Sjöberg's film Hets after a script by Ingmar Bergman.

Martin Bodin (29 September 1903 – 7 October 1976) was a Swedish cinematographer. Martin Bodin was born at the Baltic Island of Gotland in 1903. He worked for the Swedish film studio Svensk Filmindustri from 1930 to 1968, photographing more than 85 films. He died in Sollentuna north of Stockholm in 1976.

== Selected filmography ==
- The False Millionaire (1931)
- Skipper's Love (1931)
- Ship Ahoy! (1931)
- His Life's Match (1932)
- Augusta's Little Misstep (1933)
- The Song to Her (1934)
- Simon of Backabo (1934)
- Fired (1934)
- Walpurgis Night (1935)
- Unfriendly Relations (1936)
- It Pays to Advertise (1936)
- The Andersson Family (1937)
- Conflict (1937)
- Adolf Strongarm (1937)
- Art for Art's Sake (1938)
- Styrman Karlssons flammor (1938)
- Just a Bugler (1938)
- The Great Love (1938)
- Whalers (1939)
- Kiss Her! (1940)
- Poor Ferdinand (1941)
- Little Napoleon (1943)
- The Old Clock at Ronneberga (1944)
- His Excellency (1944)
- Oss tjuvar emellan eller En burk ananas (1945)
- His Majesty Must Wait (1945)
- The Journey Away (1945)
- Sunshine Follows Rain (1946)
- The Balloon (1946)
- Rail Workers (1947)
- The Girl from the Marsh Croft (1947)
- A Swedish Tiger (1948)
- Father Bom (1949)
- Customs Officer Bom (1951)
- Skipper in Stormy Weather (1951)
- Blondie, Beef and the Banana (1952)
- Encounter with Life (1952)
- Bom the Flyer (1952)
- Say It with Flowers (1952)
- Dance, My Doll (1953)
- No Man's Woman (1953)
- Dance in the Smoke (1954)
- The Unicorn (1955)
- The Biscuit (1956)
- The Halo Is Slipping (1957)
- More Than a Match for the Navy (1958)
- The Great Amateur (1958)
- Only a Waiter (1959)
- A Lion in Town (1959)
- Heaven and Pancake (1959)
- On a Bench in a Park (1960)
