= Oscar Rosander =

Swedish film editor

- Born: 25 July 1901; Eksjö, Jönköpings län, Sweden
- Died: 7 May 1971 (aged 69); Las Palmas de Gran Canaria
- Occupation: film editor
- Years active: 1935–1961

Oscar Rosander (25 July 1901 – 7 May 1971) was a Swedish film editor with more than 100 feature film credits. He was born in Eksjö, Sweden in 1901. He studied modern languages at Uppsala University and later worked with film dubbing and editing for the Swedish film studio Svensk Filmindustri.

Rosander had an extended, notable collaboration on twelve films with the director Ingmar Bergman, including Bergman's debut film Crisis (1946) as well as Smiles of a Summer Night (1955), Wild Strawberries (1957), The Magician (1958), and The Virgin Spring (1960). In his autobiography, Bergman credits Rosander with teaching him the possibilities of editing and of "editing behind the camera".

He died at Las Palmas, Canary Islands, in 1971.

== Selected filmography ==
- Ship Ahoy! (1931)
- Walpurgis Night (1935)
- Adventure (1936)
- The Wedding Trip (1936)
- The Family Secret (1936)
- Sara Learns Manners (1937)
- Conflict (1937)
- Oh, Such a Night! (1937)
- Art for Art's Sake (1938)
- Dollar (1938)
- The Great Love (1938)
- Just a Bugler (1938)
- Thunder and Lightning (1938)
- Styrman Karlssons flammor (1938)
- Good Friends and Faithful Neighbours (1938)
- Only One Night (1939)
- Whalers (1939)
- Nothing But the Truth (1939)
- Kiss Her! (1940)
- One, But a Lion! (1940)
- With Open Arms (1940)
- The Crazy Family (1940)
- Bright Prospects (1941)
- Goransson's Boy (1941)
- Poor Ferdinand (1941)
- The Fight Continues (1941)
- Dunungen (1941)
- We're All Errand Boys (1941)
- Ride Tonight! (1942)
- It Is My Music (1942)
- Night in Port (1943)
- Katrina (1943)
- Little Napoleon (1943)
- There's a Fire Burning (1943)
- Dolly Takes a Chance (1944)
- The Emperor of Portugallia (1944)
- The Invisible Wall (1944)
- Jolanta the Elusive Pig (1945)
- The Journey Away (1945)
- His Majesty Must Wait (1945)
- Oss tjuvar emellan eller En burk ananas (1945)
- The Gallows Man (1945)
- The Balloon (1946)
- Evening at the Djurgarden (1946)
- Kristin Commands (1946)
- Affairs of a Model (1946)
- Poor Little Sven (1947)
- Rail Workers (1947)
- Soldier's Reminder (1947)
- A Swedish Tiger (1948)
- Private Bom (1948)
- I Am with You (1948)
- Father Bom (1949)
- Dangerous Spring (1949)
- Woman in White (1949)
- Love Wins Out (1949)
- The Quartet That Split Up (1950)
- Fiancée for Hire (1950)
- Customs Officer Bom (1951)
- Beef and the Banana (1951)
- Skipper in Stormy Weather (1951)
- Encounter with Life (1952)
- Blondie, Beef and the Banana (1952)
- Say It with Flowers (1952)
- Defiance (1952)
- The Glass Mountain (1953)
- Dance in the Smoke (1954)
- The Unicorn (1955)
- Uncle's (1955)
- Violence (1955)
- The Light from Lund (1955)
- Seventh Heaven (1956)
- The Biscuit (1956)
- The Song of the Scarlet Flower (1956)
- Night Light (1957)
- The Halo Is Slipping (1957)
- Playing on the Rainbow (1958)
- The Jazz Boy (1958)
- A Goat in the Garden (1958)
- Only a Waiter (1959)
- On a Bench in a Park (1960)

== See also ==
- List of film director and editor collaborations
