= Harald Molander =

Swedish film producer

- Born: 25 December 1909; Helsinki, Finland
- Died: 15 July 1994 (aged 84)
- Occupation: Film producer
- Years active: 1941 - 1949

Harald Molander (25 December 1909 – 15 July 1994) was a Swedish film producer. He produced 38 films between 1941 and 1949. He was the son of director Gustaf Molander and actress Karin Molander.

== Selected filmography ==
- Ride Tonight! (1942)
- Katrina (1943)
- The Emperor of Portugallia (1944)
- Oss tjuvar emellan eller En burk ananas (1945)
- Iris and the Lieutenant (1946)
- Sunshine Follows Rain (1946)
- Crisis (1946)
- The Balloon (1946)
- Soldier's Reminder (1947)
- Rail Workers (1947)
- Poor Little Sven (1947)
- Port of Call (1948)
- Private Bom (1948)
- Woman in White (1949)
- Dangerous Spring (1949)
