= Margit Andelius =

Swedish actress (1897–1986)

- Born: Ellen Margit Teresia Andersohn; 31 July 1897; Gothenburg, Sweden
- Died: 8 August 1986 (aged 89); Stockholm, Sweden
- Occupation: Actress
- Years active: 1934–1981

Ellen Margit Teresia Ringenson (née Andersohn; 31 July 1897 – 8 August 1986), known professionally as Margit Andelius, was a Swedish actress. She made her film debut in 1934 in Uppsagd and went on to appear in supporting and character roles in a large number of Swedish films and television productions over the following decades, with screen credits running from 1934 to 1981.

== Career ==
In addition to her film work, Andelius appeared on stage at several Stockholm theatres, including Vasateatern and Blancheteatern. In 1944 she played Aunt Bina in Ingmar Bergman's staging of Hjalmar Bergman's one-act play Herr Sleeman kommer at Dramatikerstudion in Stockholm.

After her 1934 film debut, Andelius appeared in dozens of Swedish films during the studio era, almost always in supporting and character roles. Her later credits include television work; her final listed appearance was in the SVT television series Babels hus in 1981.

== Death ==
Andelius died in Stockholm on 8 August 1986, aged 89.

== Selected filmography ==
Year	Swedish title	English title (where applicable)
1934	Uppsagd	—
1935	Kanske en gentleman	Perhaps a Gentleman
1940	En, men ett lejon!	One, But a Lion!
1941	I natt – eller aldrig	Tonight or Never
1941	Livet går vidare	Life Goes On
1941	Striden går vidare	The Fight Continues
1943	Katrina	—
1945	Fram för lilla Märta	—
1946	Kristin kommenderar	Kristin Commands
1947	En fluga gör ingen sommar	One Swallow Does Not Make a Summer
1948	Lilla Märta kommer tillbaka	—
1949	Pappa Bom	Father Bom
1949	Sven Tusan	—
1949	Lång-Lasse i Delsbo	Big Lasse of Delsbo
1950	Den vita katten	The White Cat
1950	Hjärter knekt	Jack of Hearts
1951	Tull-Bom	Customs Officer Bom
1953	Flickan från Backafall	The Girl from Backafall
1956	Nattbarn	Night Child
1958	Den store amatören	The Great Amateur
1981	Babels hus (TV)	—

A complete chronological filmography is maintained in the Swedish Film Database.
