= Ludde Juberg =

Swedish actor (1884–1968)

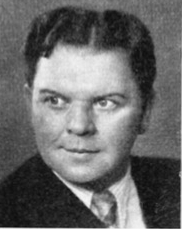
- Born: April 23, 1884; Herrestad, Sweden
- Died: May 8, 1968 (aged 84); Stockholm, Sweden
- Resting place: Norra begravningsplatsen
- Occupation: Actor

Per Ludvig "Ludde" Juberg (April 23, 1884 – May 8, 1968) was a Swedish actor and theater director.

== Filmography ==
- 1929: Konstgjorda Svensson as the medical orderly
- 1936: Ä' vi gifta? as Olsson, a porter
- 1937: Adolf Armstarke as the math professor and monk Antonius
- 1940: Mannen som alla ville mörda as district police superintendent Mörk
- 1940: Beredskapspojkar as "The Banana" Bengtsson
- 1940: Frestelse as Lambert Ljunggren
- 1944: Gröna hissen as a porter
- 1944: Lilla helgonet as the porter at the Golden Lion hotel
- 1947: Försummad av sin fru as the hot dog salesman
- 1948: Soldat Bom as Zakarias
- 1949: Kvinna i vitt (as Alfred Blom
- 1949: Farlig vår as Nilheim, the vicar
- 1951: Starkare än lagen as the man in the cabin (uncredited)
- 1956: Egen ingång as the theater doorman
- 1958: Damen i svart as the church warden
- 1958: Mannekäng i rött as the museum caretaker
