= Helga Brofeldt =

Swedish actress

- Born: Helga Amelie Elisabet Textorius; 9 October 1881; Stockholm, Sweden
- Died: 18 June 1968 (aged 86); Hägersten, Sweden
- Occupation: Actress
- Years active: 1898–1957
- Father: Oskar Textorius

Helga Brofeldt (born Helga Amelie Elisabet Textorius; 9 October 1881 – 18 June 1968) was a Swedish stage and film actress. She appeared alongside John Elfström as his wife in several of the Åsa-Nisse series of comedy films.

== Selected filmography ==
- A Perfect Gentleman (1927)
- The Realm of the Rye (1929)
- Say It with Music (1929)
- His Life's Match (1932)
- Black Roses (1932)
- International Match (1932)
- The Southsiders (1932)
- Marriageable Daughters (1933)
- What Do Men Know? (1933)
- Andersson's Kalle (1934)
- Our Boy (1936)
- Hotel Paradise (1937)
- The People of Bergslagen (1937)
- Good Friends and Faithful Neighbours (1938)
- Bashful Anton (1940)
- Lasse-Maja (1941)
- The Talk of the Town (1941)
- The Case of Ingegerd Bremssen (1942)
- We House Slaves (1942)
- The Brothers' Woman (1943)
- Blizzard (1944)
- Widower Jarl (1945)
- The Night Watchman's Wife (1947)
- Sven Tusan (1949)
- Bohus Battalion (1949)
- Åsa-Nisse (1949)
- Big Lasse of Delsbo (1949)
- Father Bom (1949)
- Åsa-Nisse Goes Hunting (1950)
- Perhaps a Gentleman (1950)
- A Ghost on Holiday (1951)
- Kalle Karlsson of Jularbo (1952)
- The Girl from Backafall (1953)
- Åsa-Nisse on Holiday (1953)
- The Glass Mountain (1953)
- Ursula, the Girl from the Finnish Forests (1953)
- Café Lunchrasten (1954)
- Young Summer (1954)
- People of the Finnish Forests (1955)
- Seventh Heaven (1956)
- Stage Entrance (1956)

== Bibliography ==
- Rochelle Wright. The Visible Wall: Jews and Other Ethnic Outsiders in Swedish Film. SIU Press, 1998.
