= Åsa-Nisse (film) =

1949 film

- Directed by: Ragnar Frisk
- Written by: Stig Cederholm (stories); Theodor Berthels
- Produced by: Gösta Sandin
- Starring: John Elfström; Artur Rolén; Emy Hagman
- Cinematography: Frank Dalin
- Music by: Johnny Bode
- Production company: Svensk Talfilm
- Distributed by: Svensk Talfilm
- Release date: 22 October 1949
- Running time: 102 minutes
- Country: Sweden
- Language: Swedish

Åsa-Nisse is a 1949 Swedish comedy film directed by Ragnar Frisk and starring John Elfström, Artur Rolén and Emy Hagman. Featuring the popular character Åsa-Nisse it was the first in a long-running series, featuring nineteen sequels. It takes place in rural Småland. Location shooting took place at Skirö outside Vetlanda. The film's sets were designed by the art director Bertil Duroj.

== Cast ==
- John Elfström as Åsa-Nisse
- Artur Rolén as Klabbarparn
- Emy Hagman as Elsa Haglund
- Bertil Boo as Eric Broo
- Greta Berthels as Eulalia
- Gustaf Lövås as Sjökvist
- Gösta Gustafson as Knohultarn
- Josua Bengtson as Jönson
- Astrid Bodin as Woman from the next parish
- Helga Brofeldt as Woman from the next parish
- Mona Geijer-Falkner as Woman from the next parish
- Einar Lidholm as Police Chief
- Stig Johanson as Olsson
- Gösta Ericsson as Crook
- Verner Oakland as Crook

== Bibliography ==
- Iverson, Gunnar, Soderbergh Widding, Astrid & Soila, Tytti. Nordic National Cinemas. Routledge, 2005.
- Sundholm, John . Historical Dictionary of Scandinavian Cinema. Scarecrow Press, 2012.
