= Åsa-Nisse in Military Uniform =

1958 film

- Directed by: Ragnar Frisk
- Written by: Per Lennart Ekström; Ragnar Frisk; George Martins
- Produced by: Gösta Sandin
- Starring: John Elfström; Artur Rolén; Brita Öberg
- Cinematography: Harry Lindberg
- Edited by: Bengt Eriksson
- Music by: Sven Rüno
- Production company: Svensk Talfilm
- Distributed by: Svensk Talfilm
- Release date: 26 September 1958
- Running time: 86 minutes
- Country: Sweden
- Language: Swedish

Åsa-Nisse in Military Uniform (Swedish: Åsa-Nisse i kronans kläder) is a 1958 Swedish comedy film directed by Ragnar Frisk and starring John Elfström, Artur Rolén and Brita Öberg. It was shot at the Täby Studios in Stockholm. It is the ninth film in the long-running Åsa-Nisse series about a raffish character living in rural Småland.

== Cast ==
- John Elfström as Åsa-Nisse
- Artur Rolén as Klabbarparn
- Brita Öberg as Eulalia
- Mona Geijer-Falkner as Kristin
- Ann-Marie Adamsson as Ulla
- Lennart Lindberg as Olle
- Gustaf Lövås as Sjökvist
- Wiktor Andersson as Knohultaren
- Bertil Boo as Bertil Boo
- Little Gerhard as Little Gerhard
- Gus Dahlström as 107:an
- Stellan Agerlo as Burgler
- Sven Holmberg as Colonel
- Georg Årlin as Doctor
- Carl-Axel Elfving as Cpl. Busk
- Georg Skarstedt as Travelling Salesman
- Astrid Bodin as Chefslottan
- Lennart Tollén as Lieutenant
- Aurora Åström as President of Women's League
- Stig Johanson as Pelle

== Bibliography ==
- Krawc, Alfred. International Directory of Cinematographers, Set- and Costume Designers in Film: Denmark, Finland, Norway, Sweden (from the beginnings to 1984). Saur, 1986.
