= Artur Rolén =

Swedish actor

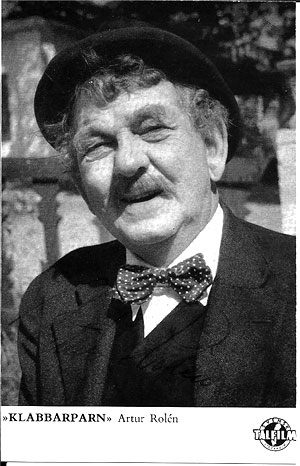
- Born: Artur Gotthard Alarik Rolén; 5 May 1894; Gothenburg, Sweden
- Died: 1 May 1972 (aged 77); Stockholm, Sweden
- Occupation: Actor
- Years active: 1916-1970 (film & TV)

Artur Rolén (5 May 1894 – 1 May 1972) was a Swedish stage and film actor. He acted prolifically in Swedish cinema for several decades as a character actor. He had a long-running role as Klabbarparn in the Åsa-Nisse comedy series.

== Selected filmography ==
- The Outlaw and His Wife (1918)
- The Österman Brothers' Virago (1932)
- Fridolf in the Lion's Den (1933)
- Whalers (1939)
- Nothing But the Truth (1939)
- Frestelse (1940)
- Kiss Her! (1940)
- The Bjorck Family (1940)
- The Crazy Family (1940)
- Lärarinna på vift (1941)
- Woman on Board (1941)
- Dunungen (1941)
- The Train Leaves at Nine (1941)
- The Poor Millionaire (1941)
- Ride Tonight! (1942)
- The Sin of Anna Lans (1943)
- Men of the Navy (1943)
- There's a Fire Burning (1943)
- Captured by a Voice (1943)
- In Darkest Smaland (1943)
- The Brothers' Woman (1943)
- A Girl for Me (1943)
- The Sixth Shot (1943)
- The Forest Is Our Heritage (1944)
- Skipper Jansson (1944)
- Blizzard (1944)
- The Girls in Smaland (1945)
- The Österman Brothers' Virago (1945)
- Meeting in the Night (1946)
- Harald the Stalwart (1946)
- Affairs of a Model (1946)
- Two Women (1947)
- Poor Little Sven (1947)
- Rail Workers (1947)
- Soldier's Reminder (1947)
- The Girl from the Marsh Croft (1947)
- A Swedish Tiger (1948)
- Life at Forsbyholm Manor (1948)
- Lars Hård (1948)
- Vagabond Blacksmiths (1949)
- Woman in White (1949)
- Realm of Man (1949)
- Sven Tusan (1949)
- Åsa-Nisse (1949)
- Dangerous Spring (1949)
- Åsa-Nisse Goes Hunting (1950)
- Andersson's Kalle (1950)
- When Love Came to the Village (1950)
- Restaurant Intim (1950)
- Fiancée for Hire (1950)
- Åsa-Nisse on Holiday (1953)
- Speed Fever (1953)
- Ursula, the Girl from the Finnish Forests (1953)
- The Red Horses (1954)
- Åsa-Nisse in Military Uniform (1958)
- Åsa-Nisse as a Policeman (1960)
- Åsa-Nisse på Mallorca (1962)

== Bibliography ==
- Cowie, Peter Françoise Buquet, Risto Pitkänen & Godfried Talboom. Scandinavian Cinema: A Survey of the Films and Film-makers of Denmark, Finland, Iceland, Norway, and Sweden. Tantivy Press, 1992.
- Furhammar, Leif. Filmen i Sverige: en historia i tio kapitel. Wiken, 1993.
