= Kanske en gentleman =

Kanske en gentleman may refer to:

- Kanske en gentleman (1935 film) (Perhaps a Gentleman), a Swedish drama film
- Perhaps a Gentleman (1950 film) (Kanske en gentleman), a Swedish comedy film
