= Josua Bengtson =

Swedish actor

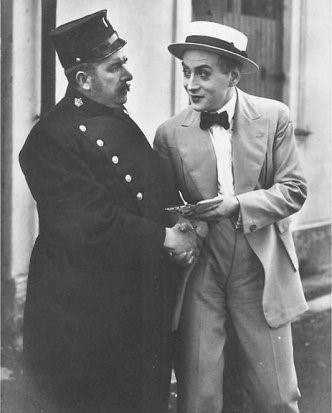
- Bengtson (left) with Gösta Ekman in the silent film Bomben (1920)
- Born: 10 January 1882; Gothenburg, Sweden
- Died: 15 December 1958 (aged 76); Täby, Sweden
- Occupation: Actor
- Years active: 1916-1955 (film)

Josua Bengtson (10 January 1882 – 15 December 1958) was a Swedish stage and film actor. He appeared prolifically as a character actor in the theatre and in Swedish cinema following his debut during the silent era. Some of his final screen appearances were in the Åsa-Nisse series.

== Selected filmography ==
- Therèse (1916)
- His Lordship's Last Will (1919)
- Sir Arne's Treasure (1919)
- Bomben (1920)
- Karin Ingmarsdotter (1920)
- Thomas Graal's Ward (1922)
- House Slaves (1923)
- Where the Lighthouse Flashes (1924)
- Ingmar's Inheritance (1925)
- His English Wife (1927)
- Sealed Lips (1927)
- The Fight Continues (1941)
- Dangerous Ways (1942)
- The Case of Ingegerd Bremssen (1942)
- Ride Tonight! (1942)
- The Emperor of Portugallia (1944)
- The Serious Game (1945)
- The Happy Tailor (1945)
- Oss tjuvar emellan eller En burk ananas (1945)
- The Journey Away (1945)
- Crime and Punishment (1945)
- Meeting in the Night (1946)
- Soldier's Reminder (1947)
- Dinner for Two (1947)
- The People of Simlang Valley (1947)
- Foreign Harbour (1948)
- Lars Hård (1948)
- Big Lasse of Delsbo (1949)
- Åsa-Nisse (1949)
- Åsa-Nisse Goes Hunting (1950)
- My Name Is Puck (1951)
- Bom the Flyer (1952)
- Love (1952)
- Åsa-Nisse on Holiday (1953)
- No Man's Woman (1953)
- Our Father and the Gypsy (1954)
- Åsa-Nisse på hal is (1954)
- Violence (1955)

== Bibliography ==
- Hong, Jai-Ung. Creating Theatrical Dreams: A Taoist Approach to Molander's, Bergman's and Wilson's Productions of Strindberg's A Dream Play. Coronet Books Incorporated, 2003.
- Steene, Birgitta. Ingmar Bergman: A Reference Guide. Amsterdam University Press, 2005.
