= Siegfried Fischer =

Swedish actor

Fritz Adolf Ferdinand Siegfried Fischer (14 July 1894 – 8 April 1976) was a Swedish actor, theatre manager, playwright, screenwriter and writer.

He was born in Stockholm, the son of conductor Franz Fischer. At seventeen years old he was hired by Axel Lindblad's theatre company. He was engaged at Blancheteatern 1919–1921 and then at the Casinoteatern until 1928, where he also worked as a director and playwright. He ran Klippans sommarteater and Söders friluftsteater for a while where he staged comedies he had written with his brother, actor Arthur Fischer. He is buried in Skogskyrkogården in Stockholm.

== Filmography ==
=== Writer ===
- Augustas lilla felsteg (1933)
- Boman's Boy (1933)
- Munkbrogreven (1935)
- Kronblom (1947)
- Kronblom kommer till stan (1949)

=== Actor ===
- Gustaf Wasa (1928)
- Boman's Boy (1933)
- Augusta's Little Misstep (1933)
- The Boys of Number Fifty Seven (1935)
- The Sixth Shot (1943)
- She Thought It Was Him (1943)
- The Forest Is Our Heritage (1944)
- The People of Hemsö (1944)
- The Girls in Smaland (1945)
- The Österman Brothers' Virago (1945)
- Life in the Finnish Woods (1947)
- Loffe as a Millionaire (1948)
- Robinson in Roslagen (1948)
- Big Lasse of Delsbo (1949)
- Bohus Battalion (1949)
- The Motor Cavaliers (1950)
- Knockout at the Breakfast Club (1950)
- Customs Officer Bom (1951)
- Skipper in Stormy Weather (1951)
- Kalle Karlsson of Jularbo (1952)
- Taxi 13 (1954)
- Laugh Bomb (1954)
- Simon the Sinner (1954)
- The Light from Lund (1955)
- We at Väddö (1958)
- Pirates on the Malonen (1959)
