= Sven Rüno =

Swedish composer

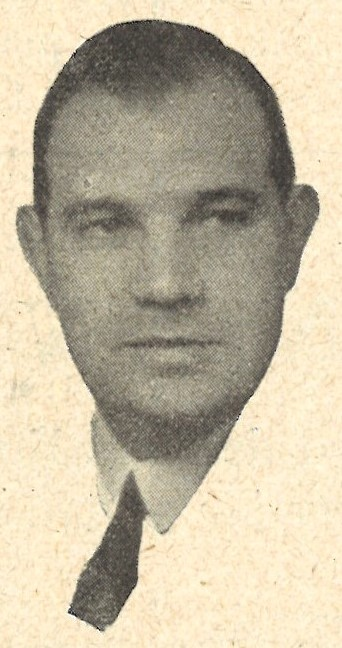
- Sven Rüno around 1930.
- Born: 13 April 1901; Stockholm, Sweden
- Died: 7 October 1960 (aged 59); Stockholm, Sweden
- Occupation: Composer
- Years active: 1940–1960 (film)

Sven Rüno (April 13, 1901 – October 7, 1960) was a Swedish composer of film scores. He scored a number of the Åsa-Nisse comedy series. He also composed the 1938 Christmas song "Jul i främmande hamn".

== Selected filmography ==
- Beredskapspojkar (1940)
- Everybody at His Station (1940)
- Fransson the Terrible (1941)
- Doctor Glas (1942)
- Mister Collins' Adventure (1943)
- She Thought It Was Him (1943)
- The Bride Came Through the Ceiling (1947)
- Perhaps a Gentleman (1950)
- Åsa-Nisse Goes Hunting (1950)
- Livat på luckan (1951)
- Åsa-Nisse på nya äventyr (1952)
- Åsa-Nisse on Holiday (1953)
- Åsa-Nisse ordnar allt (1955)
- Bröderna Östermans bravader (1955)
- Åsa-Nisse in Military Uniform (1958)

== Bibliography ==
- Rasmussen, Bjørn. Filmens hvem-vad-hvor: Udenlanske film 1950-1967. Politiken, 1968.
