= Åsa-Nisse Goes Hunting =

1950 film

- Directed by: Ragnar Frisk
- Written by: Stig Cederholm (stories); Theodor Berthels; Lennart Palme
- Produced by: Gösta Sandin
- Starring: John Elfström; Artur Rolén; Helga Brofeldt.
- Cinematography: Frank Dalin
- Music by: Sven Rüno
- Production company: Svensk Talfilm
- Distributed by: Svensk Talfilm
- Release date: 11 September 1950
- Running time: 94 minutes
- Country: Sweden
- Language: Swedish

Åsa-Nisse Goes Hunting (Swedish: Åsa-Nisse på jaktstigen) is a 1950 Swedish comedy film directed by Ragnar Frisk and starring John Elfström, Artur Rolén and Helga Brofeldt. It was the second film in the long-running Åsa-Nisse series about a raffish character living in rural Småland. The film's sets were designed by the art director Bertil Duroj.

== Synopsis ==
Åsa-Nisse is fond of poaching, but a new constable has his eye on them. When Åsa-Nisse gets his foot caught in a trap, he is arrested and taken to the city of Jönköping for trial. The same evening he and his companions go out for a night on the town where they meet two attractive young woman. Sometime later Åsa-Nisse has to explain with difficulty to his wife just what they got up to that night.

== Cast ==
- John Elfström as Åsa-Nisse
- Artur Rolén as Klabbarparn
- Helga Brofeldt as Eulalia
- Bertil Boo as Eric Broo
- Emy Hagman as Elsa Broo
- Ulla-Carin Rydén as Britta
- Gustaf Lövås as Sjökvist
- Josua Bengtson as Jönsson
- Lillie Wästfeldt as Kristin
- Willy Peters as Klöverhage
- Mary Rapp as Astrid
- Siv Ericks as Greta
- Arne Källerud as Judge

== Bibliography ==
- Krawc, Alfred. International Directory of Cinematographers, Set- and Costume Designers in Film: Denmark, Finland, Norway, Sweden (from the beginnings to 1984). Saur, 1986.
