= Åsa-Nisse on Holiday =

1953 film

- Directed by: Ragnar Frisk
- Written by: Gus Dahlström; Holger Höglund; Arne Stivell
- Produced by: Gösta Sandin
- Starring: John Elfström; Artur Rolén; Helga Brofeldt
- Cinematography: Harry Lindberg
- Edited by: Ragnar Engström
- Music by: Gunnar Lundén-Welden; Sven Rüno
- Production company: Svensk Talfilm
- Release date: 4 September 1953
- Running time: 85 minutes
- Country: Sweden
- Language: Swedish

Åsa-Nisse on Holiday (Swedish: Åsa-Nisse på semester) is a 1953 Swedish comedy film directed by Ragnar Frisk and starring John Elfström, Artur Rolén and Helga Brofeldt. It was part of a long-running series of films featuring the title character Åsa-Nisse.

The film's sets were designed by the art director Bertil Duroj.

== Cast ==
- John Elfström as Åsa-Nisse
- Artur Rolén as Klabbarparn
- Helga Brofeldt as Eulalia
- Mona Geijer-Falkner as Kristin
- Gustaf Lövås as Sjökvist
- Erna Groth as Doris
- Julia Cæsar as Klöverhage's aunt
- John Botvid as Attendant
- Dagmar Olsson as Speaker
- Willy Peters as Klöverhage
- Bertil Boo as Bertil Boo
- Josua Bengtson as Jönsson
- Wiktor Andersson as Knohultarn
- Lennart Lundh as Kirre, con-artist
- Ragnar Klange as Vicar
- Bellan Roos as Shop customer
- Pia Lundman as Girl at party
- Iréne Gleston as Girl at party
- Stig Johanson as Ticket collector
- Alf Östlund as Man on the train

== Bibliography ==
- Gunnar Iverson, Astrid Soderbergh Widding & Tytti Soila. Nordic National Cinemas. Routledge, 2005.
