= Gustaf Lövås =

Swedish actor

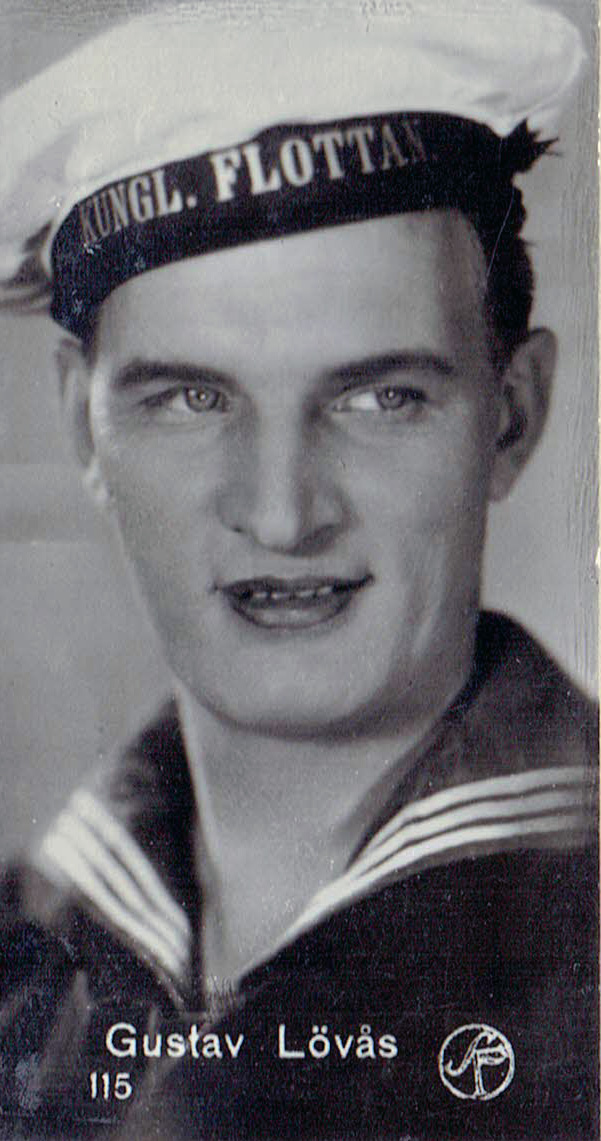
- Born: Karl Gustaf Andersson; 28 December 1894; Katrineholm, Sweden
- Died: 10 November 1968 (aged 73); Stockholm, Sweden
- Occupation: Actor
- Years active: 1920-1968 (film)

Gustaf Lövås (born Karl Gustaf Andersson; 28 December 1894 – 10 November 1968) was a Swedish stage and film actor. Many of his later screen appearances were in the long-running Åsa-Nisse series in which he played the recurring character Sjökvist.

== Selected filmography ==
- Her Little Majesty (1925)
- Uncle Frans (1926)
- The Queen of Pellagonia (1927)
- Dante's Mysteries (1931)
- Boman's Boy (1933)
- Andersson's Kalle (1934)
- Just a Bugler (1938)
- We at Solglantan (1939)
- Her Melody (1940)
- Kiss Her! (1940)
- The Green Lift (1944)
- Song of Stockholm (1947)
- Lars Hård (1948)
- Åsa-Nisse (1949)
- Vagabond Blacksmiths (1949)
- Father Bom (1949)
- Pippi Longstocking (1949)
- Åsa-Nisse Goes Hunting (1950)
- Kalle Karlsson of Jularbo (1952)
- Åsa-Nisse on Holiday (1953)
- Our Father and the Gypsy (1954)
- Åsa-Nisse in Military Uniform (1958)
- Åsa-Nisse as a Policeman (1960)
- Sailors (1964)

== Bibliography ==
- Gustafsson, Tommy. Masculinity in the Golden Age of Swedish Cinema: A Cultural Analysis of 1920s Films. McFarland, 2014.
