= Dagmar Olsson =

Swedish actress

- Born: 27 September 1908; Stockholm, Sweden
- Died: 20 December 1980 (aged 72); Stockholm, Sweden
- Occupation: Actor
- Years active: 1931–1968

Dagmar Olsson (27 September 1908 – 20 December 1980) was a Swedish film actress. She appeared in 27 films between 1931 and 1968.

== Selected filmography ==
- The False Millionaire (1931)
- It Is My Music (1942)
- We House Slaves (1942)
- Crisis (1946)
- Perhaps a Gentleman (1950)
- Skipper in Stormy Weather (1951)
- Åsa-Nisse on Holiday (1953)
- Stupid Bom (1953)
- Lovely Is the Summer Night (1961)
