= Our Father and the Gypsy =

1954 film

- Directed by: Hampe Faustman
- Written by: Sven Rosendahl
- Based on: Gud Fader och tattaren by Sven Rosendahl
- Produced by: Rune Waldekranz
- Starring: Ulf Palme; Adolf Jahr; Doris Svedlund
- Cinematography: Curt Jonsson
- Edited by: Eric Nordemar
- Music by: Erland von Koch
- Production company: Sandrews
- Distributed by: Sandrew-Baumanfilm
- Release date: 8 February 1954
- Running time: 90 minutes
- Country: Sweden
- Language: Swedish

Our Father and the Gypsy (Swedish: Gud Fader och tattaren or Tattarblod) is a 1954 Swedish drama film directed by Hampe Faustman and starring Ulf Palme, Adolf Jahr and Doris Svedlund. It was shot at the Centrumateljéerna Studios in Stockholm with location shooting around Haninge. The film's sets were designed by the art director Nils Nilsson.

== Cast ==
- Ulf Palme as David Vallander
- Adolf Jahr as Frasse Vallander
- Doris Svedlund as Blenda
- John Elfström as Johan Tapper
- Josua Bengtson as Berg
- Gull Natorp as Rakel Demant
- Axel Högel as Josef Demant
- Jan Malmsjö as Jonatan Demant
- Jan Olov Andersson as Lennart Vallander
- Peter Lindgren as Mickel
- Allan Edwall as Natan
- Gunvor Pontén as Ragnhild
- Ulla Sjöblom as Frasse's Daughter
- Märta Dorff as Frasse's Wife
- Hans Strååt as Efraim
- Margit Andelius as Teresia
- Gregor Dahlman as Villager at Auction
- Olle Ekbladh as Villager at Auction
- Gösta Gustafson as Train Conductor
- Ivar Hallbäck as Villager
- Gösta Holmström as Villager
- Stig Johanson as Marshal
- Ulf Johansson as Axel Axelsson
- Gunnar Källving as Petter
- Birger Lensander as Lumberjack
- Arne Lindblad as Horse Owner
- Adèle Lundvall as Villager
- Gustaf Lövås as Lumberjack
- Rune Ottoson as Villager at Auction
- Birger Sahlberg as Farmer Opening Gate
- Hanny Schedin as Villager
- Sture Ström as Villager
- Rune Stylander as Tradesman
- Bengt Sundmark as Lumberjack
- Elsa Textorius as Miss Tobiasson
- Ivar Wahlgren as Auctioneer
- Birger Åsander as Villager

== Bibliography ==
- Qvist, Per Olov & von Bagh, Peter. Guide to the Cinema of Sweden and Finland. Greenwood Publishing Group, 2000.
- Wright, Rochelle. The Visible Wall: Jews and Other Ethnic Outsiders in Swedish Film. SIU Press, 1998.
