= Åsa-Nisse as a Policeman =

1960 film

- Directed by: Ragnar Frisk
- Written by: Per Lennart Ekström
- Produced by: Hans Sandin
- Starring: John Elfström; Artur Rolén; Brita Öberg
- Cinematography: Åke W. Borglund
- Edited by: Bengt Eriksson
- Music by: Gunnar Bergström; Kai Gullmar; Pierre Westerman
- Production company: Svensk Talfilm
- Distributed by: Imperial Film
- Release date: 16 September 1960
- Running time: 85 minutes
- Country: Sweden
- Language: Swedish

Åsa-Nisse as a Policeman (Swedish: Åsa-Nisse som polis) is a 1960 Swedish comedy film directed by Ragnar Frisk and starring John Elfström, Artur Rolén and Brita Öberg. It was shot at the Täby Studios in Stockholm. The film's sets were designed by the art director Nils Nilsson. It was the eleventh film in the long-running Åsa-Nisse series about a raffish character living in rural Småland.

== Synopsis ==
Åsa-Nisse is recruited to serve as the police officer in the small town of Knohult, despite his previous run-ins with the law.

== Cast ==
- John Elfström as Åsa-Nisse
- Artur Rolén as Klabbarparn
- Brita Öberg as Eulalia
- Mona Geijer-Falkner as Kristin
- Gustaf Lövås as Sjökvist
- Astrid Bodin as Astrid
- Gösta Prüzelius as Klöverhage
- Gösta Jonsson as Policeman
- Inger Axö as Gun
- Bill Magnusson as Lasse
- Bertil Englund as Singer
- Carl-Olof Alm as Pettersson
- John Norrman as Jonas
- Georg Adelly as Reception Clerk
- Stig Johanson as Car thief
- Curt Löwgren as Andersson, police clerk

== Bibliography ==
- Krawc, Alfred. International Directory of Cinematographers, Set- and Costume Designers in Film: Denmark, Finland, Norway, Sweden (from the beginnings to 1984). Saur, 1986.
- Wredlund, Bertil. Långfilm i Sverige: 1960-1969. Proprius, 1982.
