= Kalle Karlsson of Jularbo =

1952 film

- Directed by: Ivar Johansson
- Written by: Carl Jularbo (autobiography); Ivar Johansson
- Produced by: Rune Waldekranz
- Starring: Kenne Fant; Rut Holm; Ingrid Thulin
- Cinematography: Carl-Erik Edlund
- Edited by: Carl-Olov Skeppstedt
- Music by: Charles Redland
- Production company: Sandrews
- Distributed by: Sandrew-Baumanfilm
- Release date: 13 October 1952
- Running time: 104 minutes
- Country: Sweden
- Language: Swedish

Kalle Karlsson of Jularbo (Swedish: Kalle Karlsson från Jularbo) is a 1952 Swedish musical drama film directed by Ivar Johansson and starring Kenne Fant, Rut Holm and Ingrid Thulin. It is a biopic loosely based on the life and music of the accordion player Carl Jularbo. It was shot at the Centrumateljéerna Studios in Stockholm. The film's sets were designed by the art director P.A. Lundgren.

== Cast ==
- Jan-Olof Lindstedt as Kalle, lillpojken
- Ola Lendahl as Kalle, mellanpojken
- Kenne Fant as Kalle, från 17 år
- Ivar Hallbäck as Alfred Karlsson, Kalles far
- Rut Holm as Selma, Alfreds hustru, Kalles mor
- Britt-Marie Janssonas Inger, lillflickan
- Kerstin Dunér as Inger, stora tösen
- Ingrid Thulin as Elsa
- Stig Järrel as Direktör Andersson
- Ingrid Backlin as Hans fru
- Alf Östlundas Biografförevisaren
- Arne Källerud as En impressario
- Arthur Fischer as En annan dito
- Gustaf Lövås as Rallar-Svante
- Torgny Anderberg as Accordion Player
- Astrid Bodin as Mrs. Bodell
- Helga Brofeldt as Peasant Woman
- Harald Emanuelsson as Värmlänning
- Siegfried Fischer as Concert Arranger
- Gustaf Färingborg as Lumberjack
- Eric Gustafson as Pettersson
- Sten Hedlund as Kompanichef
- Gösta Holmström as Martin Fors
- Stig Johanson as Fjutt-Pelle
- Arne Lindblad as Sundberg
- Martin Ljung as Frans Lundgren, Accordion Player
- Adèle Lundvall as Bondpiga
- Bellan Roos as Lill-Stina
- Sigyn Sahlin as Söt Bondpiga
- Georg Skarstedt as Provryttare
- Carl Skylling as Ole Gruttum

== Bibliography ==
- Qvist, Per Olov & von Bagh, Peter. Guide to the Cinema of Sweden and Finland. Greenwood Publishing Group, 2000.
