= Gus Dahlström =

Swedish actor

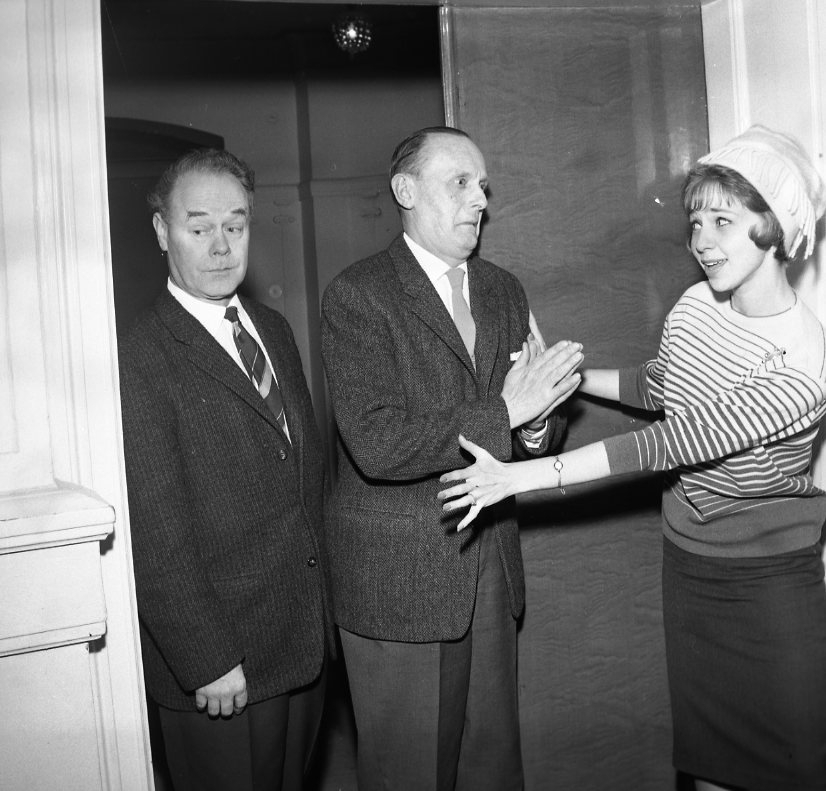
- Born: 6 November 1906; Järvsö, Sweden
- Died: 25 December 1989 (aged 83); Haninge, Sweden
- Occupation: Actor
- Years active: 1942–1984

Gus Dahlström (6 November 1906 – 25 December 1989) was a Swedish film actor. He appeared in more than 60 films between 1942 and 1984.

== Partial filmography ==
- Olycksfågeln nr 13 (1942) − Gurra (uncredited)
- Kvinnan tar befälet (1942) − 'Kurre' (uncredited)
- Rattens musketörer (1945) − Salesman (uncredited)
- 13 stolar (1945) − Drunk (uncredited)
- Crisis (1946) − Tuba Player (uncredited)
- 91:an Karlsson (1946) − 91:an 'Mandel' Karlsson
- Kronblom (1947) − 91 Karlsson (uncredited)
- Private Karlsson on Leave (1947) − 91:an 'Mandel' Karlsson
- Bohus Battalion (1949) − 116 Kålle Götlund
- Knockout at the Breakfast Club (1950) − Gus
- Påhittiga Johansson (1950) − Pratt
- Det var en gång en sjöman (1951) − Korten
- 91:an Karlssons bravader (1951) − 91:an 'Mandel' Karlsson
- 69:an, sergeanten och jag (1952) − Waldemar Johansson
- The Green Lift (1952) − Gus
- Åsa-Nisse on Holiday (1953, Writer)
- Alla tiders 91:an Karlsson (1953) − 91:an Karlsson
- Speed Fever (1953) − Comic Actor
- Bror min och jag (1953) − Gus
- Laugh Bomb (1954) − Gus
- Flottans muntergökar (1955) − Halvard
- Bröderna Östermans bravader (1955) − Skärgårdsbo (uncredited)
- Åsa-Nisse in Military Uniform (1958) − 107:an
- Åsa-Nisse slår till (1965) − Gus
- Åsa-Nisse i raketform (1966) − Jönsson
- Drra på − kul grej på väg till Götet (1967) − Policeman
- Åsa-Nisse i agentform (1967) − Jönsson
- Åsa-Nisse och den stora kalabaliken (1968) − Jönsson
- Pappa varför är du arg? Du gjorde likadant själv när du var ung (1968) − Johansson
- Freddy klarar biffen (1968) − Gardener
- Out of an Old Man's Head (1968) − Bensinstationsföreståndare
- Dagmars Heta Trosor (1971) − House Painter
- Emil i Lönneberga (1971) − Stolle−Jocke
- The Apple War (1971) − Filmregissörn
- Andersson's Kalle (1972) − Möller
- Smutsiga fingrar (1973) − Squiffed man at crime−scene
- Bröllopet (1973) − Erik Eriksson
- Andersson's Kalle on Top Form (1973) − School Janitor
- Kom till Casino! (1975)
- The Man on the Roof (1976) − Mr. Eriksson
- Drömmen om Amerika (1976) − Deaf Man
- SOPOR (1981) − Subway Manager (uncredited)
- Fanny and Alexander (1982) − Props Man − Teatern
- Rosen (1984) − Erik
