= We at Solglantan =

1939 film

- Directed by: Gunnar Olsson
- Written by: Torsten Lundqvist; Sven Zetterström
- Starring: Dagmar Ebbesen; Rut Holm; Nils Lundell
- Cinematography: Harald Berglund; Sven Thermænius
- Edited by: Gunnar Olsson
- Music by: Erik Baumann; Lasse Dahlquist; Nathan Görling
- Production company: Europa Film
- Distributed by: Europa Film
- Release date: 26 December 1939
- Running time: 94 minutes
- Country: Sweden
- Language: Swedish

We at Solglantan (Swedish: Vi på Solgläntan) is a 1939 Swedish comedy film directed by Gunnar Olsson and starring Dagmar Ebbesen, Rut Holm and Nils Lundell. It was shot at the Sundbyberg Studios in Stockholm. The film's sets were designed by the art director Max Linder.

== Cast ==
- Dagmar Ebbesen as Agnes Johansson
- Rut Holm as Rut Månsson
- Nils Lundell as Tjär-Kalle
- Britta Brunius as Greta Månsson
- Folke Hamrin as Sten Johansson
- Julia Cæsar as Julia Torpare
- Nils Hallberg as Emil
- Kerstin Berger as Bettan
- Sven-Eric Gamble as Åke Johansson
- Allan Linder as Rudolf 'Rulle' Torpare
- Kaj Hjelm as Jerker
- Åke Grönberg as Svensson
- Wiktor Andersson as Johansson
- Gustaf Lövås as Karlsson
- Carl Browallius as Chairman of City Board
- Eleonor de Floer as Lisa Morell
- Georg Funkquist as Laundry Owner
- Torsten Hillberg as Karlin
- Ivar Kåge as Member of City Board
- Bellan Roos as Mrs. Svensson
- Artur Cederborgh as Police Officer
- Mona Geijer-Falkner as Vegetable Customer
- Carl Hagman as Morell
- Arne Lindblad as Seidel
- Siri Olson as Telephone Operator
- Lisa Wirström as Mrs. Jönsson

== Bibliography ==
- Holmstrom, John. The Moving Picture Boy: An International Encyclopaedia from 1895 to 1995, Norwich, Michael Russell, 1996, p. 169.
