= Blizzard (1944 film) =

1944 film

- Directed by: Åke Ohberg
- Written by: Karl Ragnar Gierow
- Starring: Åke Ohberg; Karin Ekelund; Gunnar Olsson; Liane Linden
- Cinematography: Harald Berglund
- Edited by: Emil A. Lingheim
- Music by: Lars-Erik Larsson
- Production company: Europa Film
- Distributed by: Europa Film
- Release date: 24 January 1944
- Running time: 79 minutes
- Country: Sweden
- Language: Swedish

Blizzard (Swedish: Snöstormen) is a 1944 Swedish drama film directed by and starring Åke Ohberg and also featuring Karin Ekelund, Gunnar Olsson and Liane Linden. It was shot at the Sundbyberg Studios in Stockholm. The film's sets were designed by the art director Max Linder.

== Synopsis ==
A man suspected of murder leaves his home town, but becomes caught up in a violent snowstorm.

== Cast ==
- Karin Ekelund as Elsa
- Åke Ohberg as Lave
- Gunnar Olsson as Kristoffer
- Liane Linden as Hanna
- Torsten Hillberg as Superintendent
- Harry Ahlin as Manager
- Jullan Kindahl as Maria
- Theodor Berthels as Restaurant Keeper
- Artur Rolén as Guest at Restaurant
- Helga Brofeldt as Land-lady
- Hartwig Fock as Carlsson
- Artur Cederborgh as Man at Restaurant
- Georg Skarstedt as Guest at Restaurant
- John Norrman as Guest at Restaurant
- Carl Ericson Lumberjack
- Albin Erlandzon as Old man in woods
- Astrid Bodin as Waitress

== Bibliography ==
- Krawc, Alfred. International Directory of Cinematographers, Set- and Costume Designers in Film: Denmark, Finland, Norway, Sweden (from the beginnings to 1984). Saur, 1986.
