= The Österman Brothers' Virago (1945 film) =

1945 film

- Directed by: Ivar Johansson
- Written by: Erik Lundegård; Ivar Johansson
- Based on: The Österman Brother's Virago by Oscar Wennersten
- Starring: Emy Hagman; Adolf Jahr; Artur Rolén
- Cinematography: Erik Blomberg
- Edited by: Ivar Johansson
- Music by: Sune Waldimir
- Production company: Monark Film
- Release date: 20 September 1945
- Running time: 104 minutes
- Country: Sweden
- Language: Swedish

The Österman Brothers' Virago (Swedish: Bröderna Östermans huskors) is a 1945 Swedish comedy film directed by Ivar Johansson and starring Emy Hagman, Adolf Jahr and Artur Rolén. The title is also translated as The Österman Brothers' Shrew or The Österman Brothers' Battle-Axe. It was based on the 1913 play of the same title by Oscar Wennersten, which has been adapted for film several times. It was followed by a sequel The Wedding on Solö in 1946.

== Synopsis ==
The three lazy Österman brothers own a farm, and decide that they need help with the housework. When the maid Anna arrives she proves to be efficient and domineering and soon takes over the running of the place. This leads the brothers to consider her a Battle-axe and virago and plot about ways to get her to leave.

== Cast ==
- Emy Hagman as Anna Söderberg
- Adolf Jahr as Kalle Oesterman
- Artur Rolén as Lasse Oesterman
- John Elfström as Nisse Österman
- Julia Cæsar as Helena Vestman
- Arthur Fischer as Janne Vestman
- Siegfried Fischer as Vestman
- Agda Helin as Mrs. Storckenbrandt
- Eric Gustafson as Elof Storckenbrandt
- Nils Kihlberg as Axel Olsson
- Aurore Palmgren as Stina Olsson
- Solveig Wedin as Ella Vestman
- John Botvid as Accountant
- Bertil Ehrenmark as Captain
- Gösta Ericsson as Anders
- David Erikson as Grandell
- Hartwig Fock as Coachman
- Anna-Lisa Fröberg as Passenger
- Carl Hagman as Cashier
- Carl Harald as Policeman
- Stig Johanson as Helmsman
- Greta Liming as Girl at office
- Birger Åsander as Anna's boyfriend

== Bibliography ==
- Qvist, Per Olov & von Bagh, Peter. Guide to the Cinema of Sweden and Finland. Greenwood Publishing Group, 2000.
