= Magnus Kesster =

Swedish actor

- Born: 29 July 1901; Stockholm, Sweden
- Died: 15 April 1975 (aged 73); Stockholm, Sweden
- Occupation: Actor
- Years active: 1937-1957

Magnus Kesster (29 July 1901 – 15 April 1975) was a Swedish film actor. He appeared in 80 films between 1937 and 1957.

== Selected filmography ==
- The Pale Count (1937)
- Happy Vestköping (1937)
- A Cruise in the Albertina (1938)
- The Great Love (1938)
- A Woman's Face (1938)
- Good Friends and Faithful Neighbours (1938)
- Whalers (1939)
- Between Us Barons (1939)
- Wanted (1939)
- Only One Night (1939)
- Goransson's Boy (1941)
- Dunungen (1941)
- The Poor Millionaire (1941)
- There's a Fire Burning (1943)
- A Girl for Me (1943)
- The Green Lift (1944)
- His Excellency (1944)
- His Majesty Must Wait (1945)
- Crime and Punishment (1945)
- Iris and the Lieutenant (1946)
- It Rains on Our Love (1946)
- Incorrigible (1946)
- When the Meadows Blossom (1946)
- Kristin Commands (1946)
- Dynamite (1947)
- I Love You Karlsson (1947)
- On These Shoulders (1948)
- Loffe the Tramp (1948)
- Vagabond Blacksmiths (1949)
- Woman in White (1949)
- Son of the Sea (1949)
- The Swedish Horseman (1949)
- Two Stories Up (1950)
- Andersson's Kalle (1950)
- Teacher's First Born (1950)
- The Kiss on the Cruise (1950)
- Perhaps a Gentleman (1950)
- Skipper in Stormy Weather (1951)
- In the Arms of the Sea (1951)
- The Clang of the Pick (1952)
- Say It with Flowers (1952)
- The Beat of Wings in the Night (1953)
- A Night in the Archipelago (1953)
- Enchanted Walk (1954)
- Simon the Sinner (1954)
- Young Summer (1954)
- The Girl in Tails (1956)
