= Emy Hagman =

Swedish actress

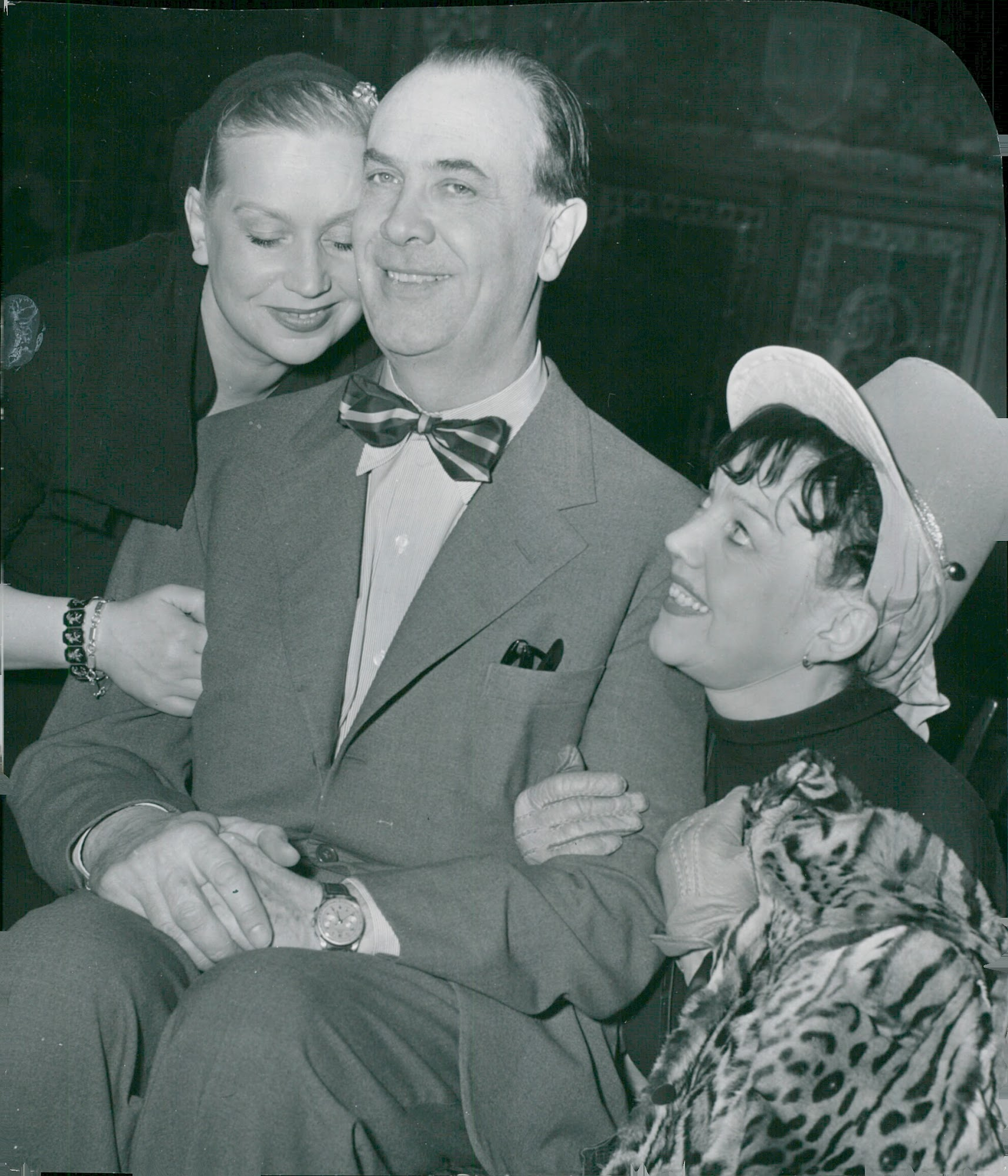
- A promotional picture for a 1951 revue. Hagman (left) alongside Karl Gerhard and Katie Rolfsen.
- Born: 9 June 1906; Gothenburg, Sweden
- Died: 30 January 1976 (aged 69); Stockholm, Sweden
- Other name: Emma Kristina Blomster
- Occupation: Actress
- Years active: 1933–1959 (film)

Emy Hagman (9 June 1906 – 30 January 1976) was a Swedish film actress and stage actress. She appeared mainly in comedies, often with rural settings although she was herself a native of the city of Gothenburg. She was married to the actor Carl Hagman from 1927 until their divorce in 1941. Their daughter Britt Hagman was a child actress, who had a brief screen career in the late 1930s and early 1940s.

She made her stage debut in 1923 and appeared in around twenty revues staged by Karl Gerhard from 1925 to 1960. She also worked on stage for the director Ragnar Klange, also appearing several of his films.

== Selected filmography ==
- Secret Svensson (1933)
- Simon of Backabo (1934)
- Eva Goes Aboard (1934)
- The Boys of Number Fifty Seven (1935)
- Just a Bugler (1938)
- Heroes in Yellow and Blue (1940)
- Goransson's Boy (1941)
- Poor Ferdinand (1941)
- Halta Lottas krog (1942)
- The Österman Brothers' Virago (1945)
- The Wedding on Solö (1946)
- Evening at the Djurgarden (1946)
- Between Brothers (1946)
- Carnival Evening (1948)
- Åsa-Nisse (1949)
- Sven Tusan (1949)
- Pippi Longstocking (1949)
- Perhaps a Gentleman (1950)
- Åsa-Nisse Goes Hunting (1952)
- Blondie, Beef and the Banana (1952)
- Café Lunchrasten (1954)
- Fridolf Stands Up! (1958)
- Only a Waiter (1959)

== Bibliography ==
- Larsson, Mariah & Marklund, Anders (ed.). Swedish Film: An Introduction and Reader. Nordic Academic Press, 2010.
- Steene, Birgitta. Ingmar Bergman: A Reference Guide. Amsterdam University Press, 2005.
