= Boman's Boy =

1933 film

- Directed by: Ivar Johansson
- Written by: Siegfried Fischer; Ivar Johansson
- Produced by: Stellan Claësson
- Starring: Bengt Djurberg; Birgit Tengroth; Sigurd Wallén
- Cinematography: Elner Åkesson
- Edited by: Ivar Johansson
- Music by: Eric Bengtson
- Production company: Centrum Film
- Distributed by: Fribergs Filmbyrå
- Release date: 13 March 1933
- Running time: 90 minutes
- Country: Sweden
- Language: Swedish

Boman's Boy (Swedish: Bomans pojke) is a 1933 Swedish comedy film directed by Ivar Johansson and starring Bengt Djurberg, Birgit Tengroth and Sigurd Wallén. It was shot at the Råsunda Studios in Stockholm. The film's sets were designed by the art director Arne Åkermark.

== Synopsis ==
An unemployed man falls in with a gang of smugglers.

== Cast ==
- Bengt Djurberg as Gösta Boman
- Birgit Tengroth as Elsa Pihlkvist
- Sigurd Wallén as Petrus Pihlkvist
- Siegfried Fischer as Adolf Boman
- Signe Lundberg-Settergren as Mrs. Frida Boman
- Bellan Roos as Svea
- Julia Cæsar as Ottilia Pihlkvist
- Thor Modéen as Fabian Fredriksson
- Gustaf Lövås as Gottfried
- Tor Borong as Pekka Stenroos
- Harry Ahlin as Karlsson, smuggler
- Gösta Alexandersson as Baker's apprentice
- Ossian Brofeldt as Ottila's friend
- Alice Carlsson as Elsa's friend
- Bertil Ehrenmark as Longshoreman
- Eivor Engelbrektsson as Girl at bakery
- Carl Ericson as August Carlsson
- Anders Frithiof as Williamsson, factory owner
- Disa Gillis as Elsa's friend
- Karin Granberg as Elsa's friend
- Richard Lindström as Customs officer
- Georg Skarstedt as Smuggler
- Carin Swensson as Elsa's friend
- Harald Wehlnor as Smuggler
- Helle Winther as Åke, Williamsson's son

== Bibliography ==
- Qvist, Per Olov & von Bagh, Peter. Guide to the Cinema of Sweden and Finland. Greenwood Publishing Group, 2000.
