= Bohus Battalion =

1949 film

- Directed by: Sölve Cederstrand; Arthur Spjuth
- Written by: Sölve Cederstrand; Arthur Spjuth
- Produced by: David Norberg
- Starring: Per Grundén; Doris Svedlund; Gus Dahlström
- Cinematography: Sven Nykvist
- Edited by: Lennart Wallén
- Music by: Sverker Ahde; Sten Frykberg; Håkan von Eichwald
- Production company: Sandrews
- Distributed by: Sandrew-Baumanfilm
- Release date: 26 December 1949
- Running time: 107 minutes
- Country: Sweden
- Language: Swedish

Bohus Battalion (Swedish: Bohus bataljon) is a 1949 Swedish comedy film directed by Sölve Cederstrand and Arthur Spjuth and starring Per Grundén, Doris Svedlund and Gus Dahlström. It was shot at the Centrumateljéerna Studios in Stockholm. The film's sets were designed by the art director P.A. Lundgren. It was part of a tradition of comedies in Swedish cinema following those called up for military service.

== Cast ==
- Per Grundén as 112 Pelle Holm
- Doris Svedlund as Elsie Tonérus
- Gus Dahlström as 116 Kålle Götlund
- Holger Höglund as 114 Kirre Johansson
- Fritiof Billquist as Capt. Lundberg
- Anne-Margrethe Björlin as Marja Holm
- Gunnar Olsson as Sebastian Tonérus
- Sten Lindgren as Capt. Striktberg
- Gösta Prüzelius as Kurt Kronborg
- Carin Swensson as Lisa
- Bengt Berger as Private
- Astrid Bodin as Woman in window
- Helga Brofeldt as Woman in window
- Siegfried Fischer as Sträng
- Anna-Lisa Fröberg as Guest at Tonérus' party
- Ivar Hallbäck as Colonel
- Leif Hedenberg as Furir
- Sten Hedlund as Officer
- Nils Hultgren as Fanjukaren
- Stig Johanson as Kalle Westerberg
- Ivar Kåge as Colonel
- Hildur Lindberg as Blå Stjärna
- Adèle Lundvall as Blå Stjärna
- Aurore Palmgren as Alma
- Mauritz Strömbom as Officer
- Rune Stylander as Speaker
- Olle Ståhl as Guest at Tonérus' party
- Tord Stål as Officer
- Gunnar Swahn as Stallfurir
- Bruno Sörwing as Private

== Bibliography ==
- Krawc, Alfred. International Directory of Cinematographers, Set- and Costume Designers in Film: Denmark, Finland, Norway, Sweden (from the beginnings to 1984). Saur, 1986.
