= Holger Höglund =

Swedish actor (1906–1965)

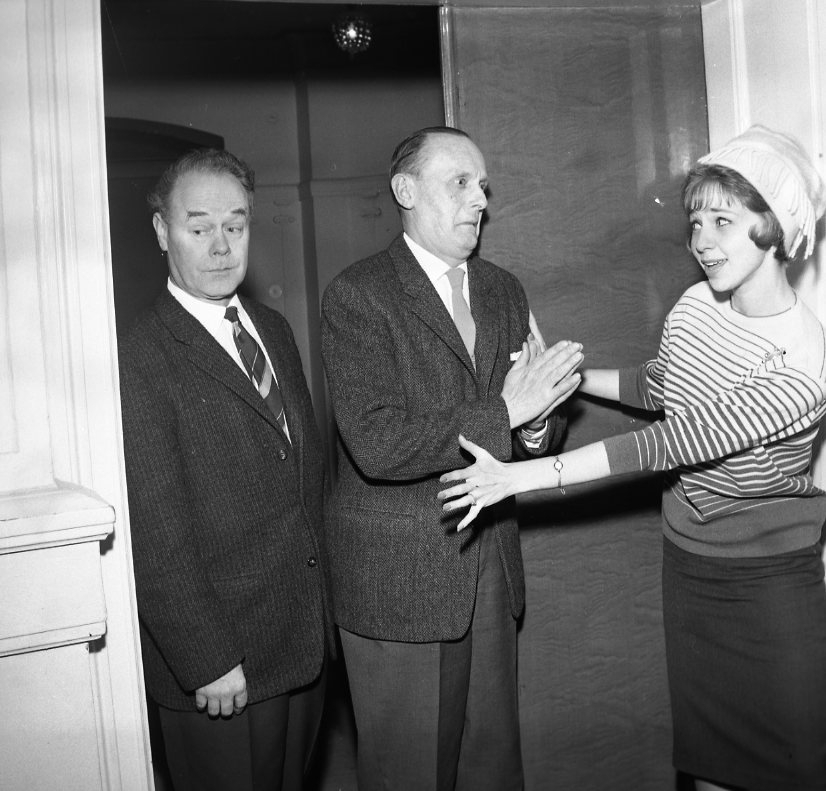
- Holger Höglund, with Gus Dahlström (left) and Anita Lindblom (right)
- Born: 31 May 1906
- Died: 23 March 1965 (aged 58)
- Occupation: Actor
- Years active: 1942–1963

Holger Höglund (31 May 1906 – 23 March 1965) was a Swedish film actor. He appeared in 28 films between 1942 and 1963.

== Selected filmography ==
- Crisis (1946)
- Private Karlsson on Leave (1947)
- Bohus Battalion (1949)
- Knockout at the Breakfast Club (1950)
- The Green Lift (1952)
- Åsa-Nisse on Holiday (1953)
- Speed Fever (1953)
- Laugh Bomb (1954)
