= There's a Fire Burning =

1943 film

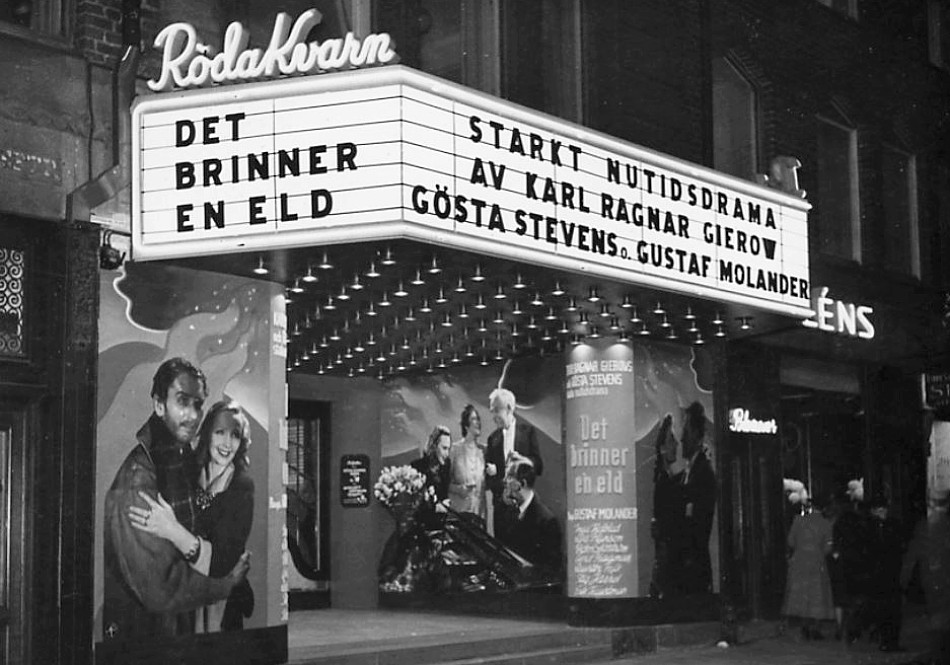
- Cinema showing the film in 1943.
- Directed by: Gustaf Molander
- Written by: Karl Ragnar Gierow; Gösta Stevens; Gustaf Molander
- Starring: Inga Tidblad; Lars Hanson; Victor Sjöström
- Cinematography: Åke Dahlqvist
- Edited by: Oscar Rosander
- Music by: Lars-Erik Larsson
- Production company: Svensk Filmindustri
- Distributed by: Svensk Filmindustri
- Release date: 23 August 1943
- Running time: 107 minutes
- Country: Sweden
- Language: Swedish

There's a Fire Burning (Swedish: Det brinner en eld) is a 1943 Swedish drama film directed by Gustaf Molander and starring Inga Tidblad, Lars Hanson and Victor Sjöström. It was made at the Råsunda Studios in Stockholm. The film's sets were designed by the art director Arne Åkermark. Location shooting took place in Jämtland County. It was set in a thinly-disguised version of German-occupied Norway. This was part of a wider wartime strategy of setting films in unnamed countries adopted by the film industry in neutral Sweden. Molander directed a further film on a similar topic The Invisible Wall the following year.

== Synopsis ==
A diplomat from a foreign country is in a relationship with the leading actress of the national theatre and is well liked by other members of the company. However, this all changes when his country invades and occupies their nation.

== Cast ==
- Inga Tidblad as Harriet Brandt
- Lars Hanson as Ernst Lemmering
- Victor Sjöström as Henrik Falkman
- Gerd Hagman as Eva Brenner
- Lauritz Falk as Lauritz Bernt
- Tollie Zellman as Lisa Albert
- Hampe Faustman as Georg Brandt
- Stig Järrel as Paul Winter
- Hugo Björne as Gen. Wollert
- Georg Funkquist as Bruhn
- Gabriel Alw as Government Minister
- Agda Helin as Frida
- Erik Hell as Jodl
- Mona Geijer-Falkner as Anna
- Ivar Kåge as Col. Barck
- Carl Ström as Col. Lanner
- Olav Riégo as Arnold
- Artur Rolén as Oskar - Stage Manager
- Karin Alexandersson as Old Woman
- Ernst Brunman as Actor
- Nils Dahlgren as Soldier
- Edvard Danielsson as Man
- Eivor Engelbrektsson as Actress
- John Ericsson as Man
- Olle Florin as Officer
- Glann Gustafsson as Actress
- Marianne Gyllenhammar as Young Woman
- Sten Hedlund as Aide
- Torsten Hillberg as Captain
- Magnus Kesster as Actor
- Marianne Lenard as Actress
- Richard Lund as Actor
- Wilma Malmlöf as Prompter
- Segol Mann as Soldier
- Helge Mauritz as Officer
- Kerstin Moheden as Woman
- Theodor Olsson as Man
- Barbro Ribbing as Woman
- Erik Rosén as Secretary of Legation
- Curt Sivers as Man
- Majken Torkeli as Actress
- Hugo Tranberg as Soldier
- Britta Vieweg as Woman
- Eric von Gegerfelt as Actor

== Bibliography ==
- Iverson, Gunnar, Soderbergh Widding, Astrid & Soila, Tytti. Nordic National Cinemas. Routledge, 2005.
- Qvist, Per Olov & von Bagh, Peter. Guide to the Cinema of Sweden and Finland. Greenwood Publishing Group, 2000.
- Wright, Rochelle. The Visible Wall: Jews and Other Ethnic Outsiders in Swedish Film. SIU Press, 1998.
