= Stig Johanson =

Swedish actor

- Born: 18 December 1919; Borås, Sweden
- Died: 9 April 1986 (aged 66); Täby, Sweden
- Occupation: Actor
- Years active: 1938–1974

Stig Johanson (18 December 1919 – 9 April 1986) was a Swedish film actor. He appeared in 80 films between 1938 and 1974.

== Selected filmography ==
- Sun Over Sweden (1938)
- The Two of Us (1939)
- The Three of Us (1940)
- Fransson the Terrible (1941)
- Adventurer (1942)
- I Am Fire and Air (1944)
- The Forest Is Our Heritage (1944)
- The Girls in Smaland (1945)
- The Österman Brothers' Virago (1945)
- Between Brothers (1946)
- Private Karlsson on Leave (1947)
- Music in Darkness (1948)
- Sin (1948)
- Foreign Harbour (1948)
- Loffe as a Millionaire (1948)
- Lars Hård (1948)
- Bohus Battalion (1949)
- Åsa-Nisse (1949)
- The Kiss on the Cruise (1950)
- Andersson's Kalle (1950)
- Teacher's First Born (1950)
- Skipper in Stormy Weather (1951)
- In the Arms of the Sea (1951)
- Kalle Karlsson of Jularbo (1952)
- She Came Like the Wind (1952)
- One Fiancée at a Time (1952)
- Åsa-Nisse on Holiday (1953)
- Dance, My Doll (1953)
- The Road to Klockrike (1953)
- Café Lunchrasten (1954)
- Storm Over Tjurö (1954)
- Salka Valka (1954)
- Simon the Sinner (1954)
- Enchanted Walk (1954)
- Our Father and the Gypsy (1954)
- Voyage in the Night (1955)
- Far och flyg (1955)
- Darling of Mine (1955)
- The People of Hemsö (1955)
- A Little Nest (1956)
- The Hard Game (1956)
- The Girl in Tails (1956)
- Synnöve Solbakken (1957)
- Night Light (1957)
- We at Väddö (1958)
- Åsa-Nisse in Military Uniform (1958)
- Åsa-Nisse as a Policeman (1960)
- Andersson's Kalle (1972)
