= Jul i främmande hamn =

Song by Johnny Bode
- Language: Swedish
- A-side: "Den sista julresan"
- Released: November 1938
- Recorded: Stockholm, Sweden, 22 October 1938
- Genre: popular music
- Label: Sonora
- Songwriter: Sven Rüno

Jul i främmande hamn is a Christmas song written by Sven Rüno, and recorded by Johnny Bode for Sonora, released in November 1938 as the B-side of "Den sista julresan" and by Erik Källqvist, released as an A-side for Columbia in December the same year. The song has also been recorded by Yngve Stoor, released on his 1957 EP White Christmas.

Lyrical, the song depicts a group of sailors from Sweden celebrating Christmas in a seaport town named Rio Grande, in an unnamed country. The song also includes a piece out of Alice Tegnér's song Kring julgranen.

In 1970, Thory Bernhards recorded the song as Rolle, with lyrics by John Algot.
