= The Forest Is Our Heritage =

1944 film

- Directed by: Ivar Johansson
- Written by: Per Wikberg (novel); Ivar Johansson
- Produced by: Sven Nygren
- Starring: Erik 'Bullen' Berglund; Birgit Tengroth; Sven Magnusson
- Cinematography: Karl-Erik Alberts
- Edited by: Ivar Johansson
- Music by: Jules Sylvain
- Production company: Film AB Lux
- Distributed by: Film AB Lux
- Release date: 12 August 1944
- Running time: 91 minutes
- Country: Sweden
- Language: Swedish

The Forest Is Our Heritage (Swedish: Skogen är vår arvedel) is a 1944 Swedish drama film directed by Ivar Johansson and starring Erik 'Bullen' Berglund, Birgit Tengroth and Sven Magnusson. It was shot at the Centrumateljéerna Studios in Stockholm. The film's sets were designed by the art director Bertil Duroj.

== Cast ==
- Erik 'Bullen' Berglund as Per Jonsson
- Birgit Tengroth as Märta Jonsson
- Sven Magnusson as Nisse Lund
- Birger Åsander as Vikman
- Helge Karlsson as Carlsson
- John Elfström as Larsson
- Artur Rolén as Hurtig
- Eric Laurent as Levin
- Åke Uppström as Roos
- Stig Johanson as Bredberg
- Ingemar Holde as Ferm
- Siegfried Fischer as Kallman
- Sten Lindgren as Engineer Karlmark
- Börje Mellvig as Engineer Hellgren
- Tekla Sjöblom as Hilda
- Artur Cederborgh as Maans Bleking

== Bibliography ==
- Qvist, Per Olov & von Bagh, Peter. Guide to the Cinema of Sweden and Finland. Greenwood Publishing Group, 2000.
