= Guttersnipes (film) =

1944 film

- Directed by: Ragnar Frisk
- Written by: Åke Hodell (play); Torsten Lundqvist
- Starring: Adolf Jahr; Britta Brunius; Lillie Wästfeldt
- Cinematography: Ewert Löfstedt
- Music by: Ernfrid Ahlin
- Production company: Svensk Talfilm
- Distributed by: Svensk Talfilm
- Release date: 18 December 1944
- Running time: 78 minutes
- Country: Sweden
- Language: Swedish

Guttersnipes (Swedish: Rännstensungar) is a 1944 Swedish drama film directed by Ragnar Frisk and starring Adolf Jahr, Britta Brunius and Lillie Wästfeldt.

The film's sets were designed by the art director Bertil Duroj. It was partly shot on location in Malmö.

== Cast ==
- Adolf Jahr as Johan Fahlen
- Britta Brunius as Märta Sanner
- Lillie Wästfeldt as Malina Karlsson
- Harry Persson as Jaffe
- Birgitta Hoppeler as Ninni
- Gunnel Nilsson as Murre
- Hans Lindgren as Bigge
- Erik Ahlfors as Janne
- Per Björkman as Superintendent
- Bertil Brusewitz as Högstrand
- Göran Dahlén as Palle
- Eric Malmberg as Winfelt
- Josef Norman as Wendel
- Hilding Rolin as Doctor
- Stina Ståhle as Mrs. Högstrand
- Richard Svanström as Gallery Manager
- Gösta Tönne as Preben
- Stig Jönsson as Boy
- Torsten Mårtensson as 'Rolle'
- Elisabeth Nisborg as 'Pyret'
- Ivan Nyberg as Boy
- Kurt Olsson as Boy
- Kjell Winberg as Boy
- Bertil Övall as Boy

== Bibliography ==
- John Sundholm. Historical Dictionary of Scandinavian Cinema. Scarecrow Press, 2012.
