= Georg Skarstedt =

Swedish actor (1900–1976)

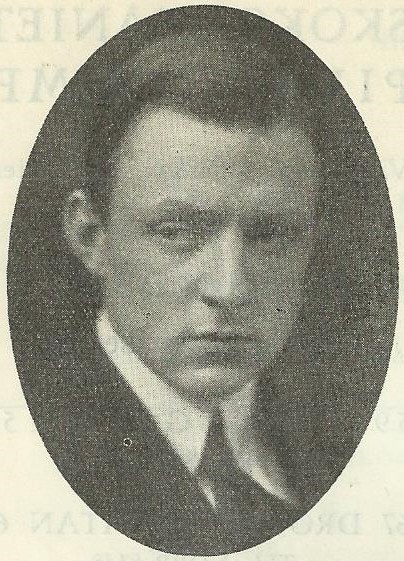
- Så'na djur finns inte at Odeonteatern, Stockholm 1928.
- Born: Per Georg Wilhelm Skarstedt; 31 January 1900; Falun, Sweden
- Died: 8 December 1976 (aged 76); Vällingby, Stockholm, Sweden
- Occupation: Actor
- Years active: 1920–69

Georg Skarstedt (31 January 1900 – 8 December 1976) was a Swedish actor. He appeared in more 120 films between 1920 and 1969.

== Selected filmography ==
- The People of Norrland (1930)
- A Night of Love by the Öresund (1931)
- International Match (1932)
- Lucky Devils (1932)
- Boman's Boy (1933)
- Simon of Backabo (1934)
- The Marriage Game (1935)
- Ocean Breakers (1935)
- Conflict (1937)
- The Andersson Family (1937)
- Adolf Strongarm (1937)
- Storm Over the Skerries (1938)
- Kiss Her! (1940)
- Only a Woman (1941)
- Captured by a Voice (1943)
- Blizzard (1944)
- Motherhood (1945)
- Black Roses (1945)
- The Rose of Tistelön (1945)
- Harald the Stalwart (1946)
- The Poetry of Ådalen (1947)
- Maria (1947)
- Neglected by His Wife (1947)
- The People of Simlang Valley (1947)
- Music in Darkness (1948)
- Sin (1948)
- Robinson in Roslagen (1948)
- On These Shoulders (1948)
- Foreign Harbour (1948)
- Lars Hård (1948)
- Vagabond Blacksmiths (1949)
- Big Lasse of Delsbo (1949)
- Woman in White (1949)
- Son of the Sea (1949)
- Restaurant Intim (1950)
- The Motor Cavaliers (1950)
- When Love Came to the Village (1950)
- The Kiss on the Cruise (1950)
- The Quartet That Split Up (1950)
- Perhaps a Gentleman (1950)
- Stronger Than the Law (1951)
- In the Arms of the Sea (1951)
- Summer with Monika (1952)
- She Came Like the Wind (1952)
- Kalle Karlsson of Jularbo (1952)
- Dance, My Doll (1953)
- Simon the Sinner (1954)
- Storm Over Tjurö (1954)
- The Vicious Breed (1954)
- Enchanted Walk (1954)
- Paradise (1955)
- Voyage in the Night (1955)
- Uncle's (1955)
- Darling of Mine (1955)
- The Light from Lund (1955)
- The Dance Hall (1955)
- The Girl in Tails (1956)
- Laughing in the Sunshine (1956)
- Night Child (1956)
- Encounters in the Twilight (1957)
- Bill Bergson Lives Dangerously (1957)
- Miss April (1958)
- A Goat in the Garden (1958)
- Åsa-Nisse in Military Uniform (1958)
- The Great Amateur (1958)
- On a Bench in a Park (1960)
- Two Living, One Dead (1961)
- Ticket to Paradise (1962)
- Hide and Seek (1963)
- Äktenskapsbrottaren (1964)
- The Bookseller Gave Up Bathing (1969)
