= The Motor Cavaliers =

1950 film

- Directed by: Elof Ahrle
- Written by: Gert Marcusson
- Produced by: Carl-Johan Sundquist
- Starring: Åke Söderblom; Viveca Serlachius; Sten Gester
- Cinematography: Hilding Bladh
- Edited by: Lennart Wallén
- Music by: Sune Waldimir
- Production company: Sandrews
- Distributed by: Stockholm Film
- Release date: 13 March 1950
- Running time: 74 minutes
- Country: Sweden
- Language: Swedish

The Motor Cavaliers (Swedish: Motorkavaljerer) is a 1950 Swedish comedy sports film directed by Elof Ahrle and starring Åke Söderblom, Viveca Serlachius and Sten Gester. It was shot at the Centrumateljéerna Studios in Stockholm. The film's sets were designed by the art director P.A. Lundgren.

== Synopsis ==
A shop assistant becomes an unlikely motorcycle speedway star after he agrees to substitute for his friend who actually drove the winning bike. After trying to escape publicity he heads to the countryside, but returns to take part in a major race which he himself really wins this time. He also wins the affections of the daughter of his employer.

== Cast ==
- Åke Söderblom as Åke Svärd
- Viveca Serlachius as Maj
- Elof Ahrle as Pelle Greiberg
- Gunilla Klosterborg as Gun Wall
- Sten Gester as Olle Eggert
- Sigge Fürst as Radio Speaker
- Rut Holm as Augusta Klang
- Stig Järrel as Major Eggert
- Emmy Albiin as Johanna
- Harriet Andersson as Waitress
- Wiktor Andersson as Gardener
- Sven-Axel Carlsson as Moje
- Siegfried Fischer as Taxi driver
- Carl-Gustaf Lindstedt as Shirt salesman
- John Melin as Man in audience
- Gunilla Pontén as Bathing beauty
- Olav Riégo as Mr. Wall, Gun's father
- Hanny Schedin as Mrs. Pettersson
- Georg Skarstedt as Man
- Katarina Taikon as Bathing beauty
- Rose-Marie Taikon as Bathing beauty
- Alf Östlund as Jonas Kvist

== Bibliography ==
- Qvist, Per Olov & von Bagh, Peter. Guide to the Cinema of Sweden and Finland. Greenwood Publishing Group, 2000.
- Segrave, Kerry & Martin, Linda. The Continental Actress: European Film Stars of the Postwar Era--biographies, Criticism, Filmographies, Bibliographies. McFarland, 1990.
