= Skipper in Stormy Weather =

1951 film

- Directed by: Gunnar Olsson
- Written by: Rune Lindström; Olle Länsberg
- Produced by: Allan Ekelund
- Starring: Adolf Jahr; Elof Ahrle; Bengt Eklund
- Cinematography: Martin Bodin; Gunnar Fischer
- Edited by: Oscar Rosander
- Music by: Bengt Wallerström
- Production company: Svensk Filmindustri
- Distributed by: Svensk Filmindustri
- Release date: 27 August 1951
- Running time: 79 minutes
- Country: Sweden
- Language: Swedish

Skipper in Stormy Weather (Swedish: Skeppare i blåsväder) is a 1951 Swedish comedy film directed by Gunnar Olsson and starring Adolf Jahr, Elof Ahrle and Bengt Eklund. It was shot at the Råsunda Studios in Stockholm and on location around Gothenburg. The film's sets were designed by the art director Nils Svenwall.

== Synopsis ==
An elderly fisherman refuses to recognise the need to replace his fishing vessel.

== Cast ==
- Adolf Jahr as Alexander Alexandersson
- Elof Ahrle as Trekvarts-Olle
- Bengt Eklund as Åke Kristiansson
- Sigbrit Molin as Britta Alexandersson
- Gunnar Olsson as Birger Birgersson
- Sven-Eric Gamble as Verner Kristiansson
- Dagmar Olsson as Astrid Birgersson
- Arthur Fischer as Sigurd
- Magnus Kesster as Kristiansson Sr.
- Frithiof Bjärne as 'Tarzan'
- Mats Björne as Harry
- Julia Cæsar as Julia, customer
- Åke Grönberg as Singer
- Kaj Hjelm as Sven
- Stig Johanson as Gustaf
- Oscar Ljung as Valter
- Harry Ahlin as Hamnbas i Göteborg
- Sven-Axel Carlsson as Bengt, skeppspojke
- Sture Ericson as Varvsbokhållare
- Siegfried Fischer as Albin, f.d. trålskeppare
- Frithiof Hedvall as Restaurangvaktmästare
- Gustaf Hiort af Ornäs as Båtköpare
- Marianne Hylén as Greta, sjuksköterska

== Bibliography ==
- Qvist, Per Olov & von Bagh, Peter. Guide to the Cinema of Sweden and Finland. Greenwood Publishing Group, 2000.
- Wredlund, Bertil & Lindfors, Rolf. Långfilm i Sverige: 1950–1959. Proprius, 1979.
