= Laugh Bomb =

1954 film

- Directed by: Börje Larsson
- Written by: Börje Larsson
- Produced by: Otto Scheutz
- Starring: Gus Dahlström; Holger Höglund; Karl-Arne Holmsten
- Cinematography: Curt Jonsson
- Edited by: Arne Löfgren
- Music by: Sune Waldimir
- Production company: Sandrews
- Distributed by: Sandrew-Bauman
- Release date: 26 December 1954
- Running time: 84 minutes
- Country: Sweden
- Language: Swedish

Laugh Bomb (Swedish: Skrattbomben) is a 1954 Swedish comedy film written and directed by Börje Larsson and starring Gus Dahlström, Holger Höglund and Karl-Arne Holmsten. It was shot at the Centrumateljéerna Studios in Stockholm. The film's sets were designed by the art director Nils Nilsson.

== Synopsis ==
Two men working at a research laboratory invent a new bomb that can induce laughter, but it is stolen before they can display it to their superiors and they set out to recover it.

== Cast ==
- Gus Dahlström as Gus
- Holger Höglund as Holger
- Karl-Arne Holmsten as John
- Georg Rydeberg as Georg Regin
- Bibi Nyström as Linda
- Gunnar Olsson as Professor Planius
- Birgitta Andersson as Vera
- Git Gay as Elegant lady
- Ulf Johansson as Police Commissioner
- Olof Thunberg as Villain
- Gustaf Färingborg as Jealous Husband
- Siegfried Fischer as Hansson
- Ulla-Bella Fridh as Maid

== Bibliography ==
- Wredlund, Bertil & Lindfors, Rolf . Långfilm i Sverige: 1950–1959. Proprius, 1979.
