= Sture Ericson =

Swedish actor (1912–1979)

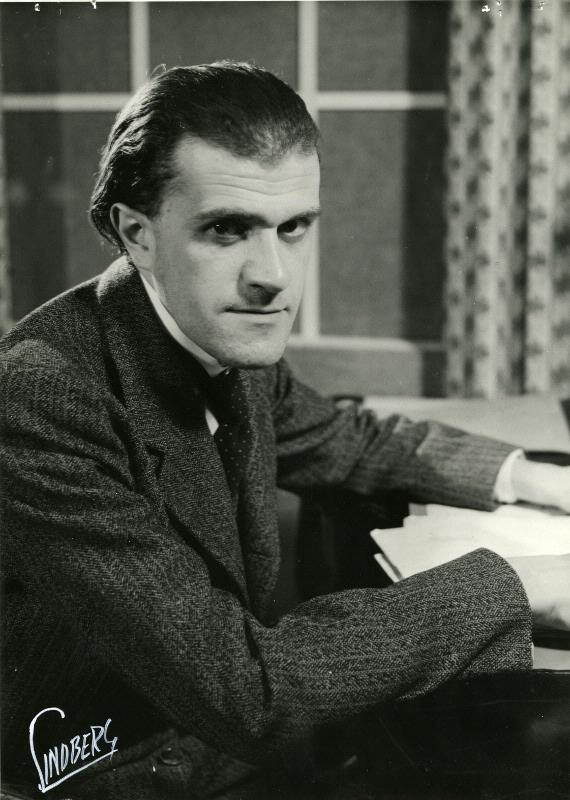
- Sture Ericson in Easter at Helsingborg City Theatre 1947/48.
- Born: 27 September 1912; Salem, Sweden
- Died: 15 March 1979 (aged 66); Stockholm, Sweden
- Occupation: Actor
- Years active: 1941-1977

Sture Ericson (27 September 1912 – 15 March 1979) was a Swedish film actor. He was born in Salem, Sweden and died in Stockholm.

== Filmography ==
Year	Title	Role	Notes
1941	Hem från Babylon	Soldier in Manchuria	Uncredited
1944	We Need Each Other	Blacksmith	
1944	The Girl and the Devil	Man at Harvest Festival	
1946	Crisis	Horn Player	Uncredited
1946	It Rains on Our Love	Kängsnöret	
1946	When the Meadows Blossom	Svensson	
1948	Vagabond Blacksmiths	Man at bicycle	
1948	Port of Call	Ljungberg - Gertrud's Father	Uncredited
1948	Eva	Josef Friedel	
1949	Smeder på luffen	Tramp	
1949	Sjösalavår	Strand	
1949	The Swedish Horseman	Mickel	
1949	Big Lasse of Delsbo	Friend of Tratt-Lasse	
1949	Number 17	Schmidt	
1951	Miss Julie	Jean's father	Uncredited
1951	Skipper in Stormy Weather	Varvsbokhållare	Uncredited
1953	Barabbas	Father of Hare-lipped	Uncredited
1954	Seger i mörker	Hand	Uncredited
1962	Chans	Mari's Father	
1966	Ön	Viktor Sundberg	
1966	Adamsson i Sverige	Police Captain	
1967	Resan	Father	
1971	The Apple War	Larsson i Tofta (s) riksdagsman	
1975	Ungkarlshotellet	Kompis på caféet	
1976	Förvandlingen		
