= 100 dragspel och en flicka =

- 100 dragspel och en flicka
- Directed by: Ragnar Frisk
- Written by: Torsten Lundqvist
- Produced by: Erik Bergstrand
- Starring: Elof Ahrle, Ingrid Backlin, Bengt Logardt
- Music by: Jules Sylvain
- Production company: AB Rex Film
- Release date: 31 January 1946 (Sweden)
- Running time: 90 minutes
- Country: Sweden
- Language: Swedish

100 dragspel och en flicka ("100 Accordions and One Girl") is a Swedish comedy film from 1946 directed by Ragnar Frisk. The film's title is a reference to One Hundred Men and a Girl.

== Plot ==
Two inventors, Ville and Rulle (Elof Ahrle and Bengt Logardt) have developed a revolutionary new accordion; however, they have competition. Twelve-year-old Pelle Borell (Anders Nyström) gets to show off the instrument in front of the Swedish accordion elite in Stockholm.

== Reception ==
The film was positively received at the time of its release, with Elof Ahrle receiving particular praise. Stockholmstidningen wrote: "Ahrle gets his best comical role in a long time". Aftontidningen wrote: "A film that will go straight into the Swedish people's heart. Elof Ahrle's character has the potential to become a future classic." Expressen gave the film a more negative review, while still praising Ahrle.

== Release ==
The film was first screened in Sundsvall on 31 January 1946.

== Selected cast ==
- Elof Ahrle – Ville Karlsson
- Ingrid Backlin – Siv Jonsson
- Bengt Logardt – Rudolf Berg
- Anita Björk – Elsa Borell
- Gösta Cederlund – grandfather Julius "Julle" Borell
- Anders Nyström – Pelle Borell, Elsa's brother
- Carl-Gunnar Wingård – factory owner Jonsson, Siv's father, owner of Svenska Dragspelsfabriken
- Bertil Berglund – Nils Andersson-Grip, supervisor of Svenska Dragspelsfabriken
- Evert Granholm – Hjelm, representative of Speilmans Dragspelsfabrik
- Arne Lindblad – manager Speilman, owner of Speilmans Dragspelfabrik
- Stina Sorbon –Viola
- Birgit Johannesson – Miss Lange, guest at restaurant Verona
- Sigge Fürst – host
- Lasse Benny – accordion player
- Stefan Dahlén – accordion player
- Allan Eriksson – accordion player
- Erik Frank – accordion player
- Karl Grönstedt – accordion player
- Hans-Erik Nääs – accordion player
- Sölve Strand – accordion player
- Ivan Thelmé – accordion player
- Andrew Walter – accordion player
- Gösta Westerlund – accordion player

== DVD ==
The film was released on DVD in 2004.
