= Adolf Jahr =

Swedish actor (1893–1964)

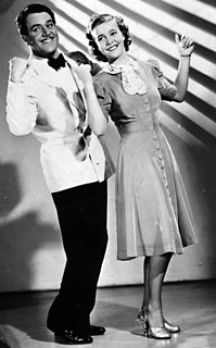
- Adolf Jahr och Alice Babs in Swing it, magistern! (1940).
- Born: 23 June 1893; Nälden, Jämtland County, Sweden-Norway
- Died: 19 April 1964 (aged 70); Stockholm, Sweden
- Occupation: Actor
- Years active: 1925-1962

Johan Adolf Reinhold Jahr, born Johansson (23 June 1893 – 19 April 1964) was a Swedish film actor. He appeared in more than 60 films between 1925 and 1962.

== Selected filmography ==
- Mother-in-Law's Coming (1932)
- False Greta (1934)
- A Wedding Night at Stjarnehov (1934)
- Kanske en gentleman (1935)
- The Ghost of Bragehus (1936)
- Conscientious Objector Adolf (1936)
- Poor Millionaires (1936)
- Adolf Strongarm (1937)
- Just a Bugler (1938)
- A Cruise in the Albertina (1938)
- Adolf Saves the Day (1938)
- Between Us Barons (1939)
- Swing it, magistern! (1940)
- A Real Man (1940)
- Dunungen (1941)
- Guttersnipes (1944)
- The People of Hemsö (1944)
- The Österman Brothers' Virago (1945)
- The Wedding on Solö (1946)
- Evening at the Djurgarden (1946)
- The Poetry of Ådalen (1947)
- Främmande hamn (1948)
- Carnival Evening (1948)
- Robinson in Roslagen (1948)
- Lars Hård (1948)
- The Quartet That Split Up (1950)
- While the City Sleeps (1950)
- Skipper in Stormy Weather (1951)
- Dance, My Doll (1953)
- Storm Over Tjurö (1954)
- Our Father and the Gypsy (1954)
- People of the Finnish Forests (1955)
- Laughing in the Sunshine (1956)
- Only a Waiter (1959)
- When Darkness Falls (1960)
