= Vagabond Blacksmiths =

1949 film

- Directed by: Hampe Faustman
- Written by: Johan-Olov Johansson (novel); Harald Beijer; Hampe Faustman; Jan Molander
- Starring: Anders Börje; Åke Fridell; Georg Skarstedt
- Cinematography: Göran Strindberg
- Edited by: Lennart Wallén
- Music by: Lille Bror Söderlundh
- Production company: Nordisk Tonefilm
- Distributed by: Nordisk Tonefilm
- Release date: 7 February 1949
- Running time: 76 minutes
- Country: Sweden
- Language: Swedish

Vagabond Blacksmiths (Swedish: Smeder på luffen) is a 1949 Swedish drama film directed by Hampe Faustman and starring Anders Börje, Åke Fridell and Georg Skarstedt. It was shot at the Centrumateljéerna Studios in Stockholm. The film's sets were designed by the art director P.A. Lundgren.

== Cast ==
- Anders Börje as Anders Herou
- Åke Fridell as Jernberg
- Georg Skarstedt as Falk
- John Elfström as Fyrström
- Rose-Marie Taikon as Käti
- Doris Svedlund as Inga Herou
- Gösta Cederlund as Squire
- Pauline Taikon as Miriam
- Gunnar Olsson as Lind
- Ernst Eklund as Kilbom
- Björn Berglund as Erik Herou
- Harriett Philipson as Britta
- Hampe Faustman as Brofelt
- Jan Molander as Bolund
- Artur Rolén as Blanke
- Hugo Jacobsson as Britta's Father
- Gustaf Lövås as Policeman
- Magnus Kesster as Inspector
- Sture Ericson as Tramp
- Sif Ruud as Kilbergs-Lina
- Gösta Holmström as Verner
- Rune Stylander as Policeman
- Werner Ohlson as Farmer
- Albin Erlandzon as Kilberg, Lina's father
- Ivar Wahlgren as Hane, smith
- Axel Högel as Gofeng, smith
- Tord Stål as Police sergeant

== Bibliography ==
- Sundholm, John. Historical Dictionary of Scandinavian Cinema. Scarecrow Press, 2012.
