= Love (1952 film) =

1952 film

- Directed by: Gustaf Molander
- Written by: Rune Lindström; Gustaf Molander
- Based on: Kærlighed; 1926 play by Kaj Munk
- Produced by: Allan Ekelund
- Starring: Sven Lindberg; Doris Svedlund; Victor Sjöström
- Cinematography: Åke Dahlqvist
- Edited by: Gösta Lewin
- Music by: Lars-Erik Larsson
- Production company: Svensk Filmindustri
- Distributed by: Svensk Filmindustri
- Release date: 22 December 1952
- Running time: 106 minutes
- Country: Sweden
- Language: Swedish

Love (Swedish: Kärlek) is a 1952 Swedish drama film directed by Gustaf Molander and starring Sven Lindberg, Doris Svedlund and Victor Sjöström. It was shot at the Råsunda Studios in Stockholm. The film's sets were designed by the art director Nils Svenwall.

== Cast ==
- Sven Lindberg as Einar Brandt, priest
- Doris Svedlund as Inga Tomasson
- Erik Strandmark as Anton Tomasson
- Victor Sjöström as Bishop
- Anders Henrikson as Sylvester Andreasson
- Hugo Björne as Andersson, parish clerk
- Gunnel Lindblom as Rebecka Andersson
- Kolbjörn Knudsen as Brandéus, dean
- Jarl Kulle as Wilhelm Andreasson
- Märta Dorff as Selma Danielsson
- Torsten Lilliecrona as Johan Johansson
- Jan Molander as Sofus, fisherman
- Axel Högel as Simon, fisherman
- Josua Bengtson as Fisherman
- Wiktor Andersson as Shoemaker
- Emmy Albiin as Hanna
- Anders Andelius as Emrik Danielsson, Selma's son
- Mats Björne as Member of boat's crew
- Elsa Ebbesen as Ms. Mattsson
- Mona Geijer-Falkner as Malin
- Karin Högel as Woman at accident site
- Börje Mellvig as Dr. Holm
- Björn Montin as Olle, a boy in church
- Björn Näslund as Rolf, member of the trawler's crew
- Gösta Qvist as Man at accident site
- Walter Sarmell as Member of the trawler's crew

== Bibliography ==
- Qvist, Per Olov & von Bagh, Peter. Guide to the Cinema of Sweden and Finland. Greenwood Publishing Group, 2000.
