= P. A. Lundgren =

Swedish art director (1911–2002)

- Born: 3 July 1911; Vastra Harg, Sweden
- Died: 27 September 2002 (aged 91); Malmö, Sweden
- Other name: Per Axel Lundgren
- Occupation: Art director
- Years active: 1944–1981

Per Axel Lundgren (1911–2002), credited as P. A. Lundgren, was a Swedish art director active in Swedish cinema from the 1940s to 1980s. He is known in particular for his collaborations with the film director Ingmar Bergman.

== Selected filmography ==
- We Need Each Other (1944)
- The Girl and the Devil (1944)
- My People Are Not Yours (1944)
- It Rains on Our Love (1946)
- When the Meadows Blossom (1946)
- Life in the Finnish Woods (1947)
- Lars Hård (1948)
- Carnival Evening (1948)
- Foreign Harbour (1948)
- Bohus Battalion (1949)
- The Street (1949)
- Son of the Sea (1949)
- Vagabond Blacksmiths (1949)
- Big Lasse of Delsbo (1949)
- The Devil and the Smalander (1949)
- When Love Came to the Village (1950)
- The Motor Cavaliers (1950)
- The Realm of the Rye (1950)
- Stronger Than the Law (1951)
- A Ghost on Holiday (1951)
- In the Arms of the Sea (1951)
- In Lilac Time (1952)
- Kalle Karlsson of Jularbo (1952)
- Summer with Monika (1953)
- The Glass Mountain (1953)
- No Man's Woman (1953)
- Hidden in the Fog (1953)
- A Lesson in Love (1954)
- Sir Arne's Treasure (1954)
- Wild Birds (1955)
- The Light from Lund (1955)
- Uncle's (1955)
- Violence (1955)
- The Unicorn (1955)
- The Biscuit (1956)
- The Hard Game (1956)
- Seventh Heaven (1956)
- The Song of the Scarlet Flower (1956)
- The Seventh Seal (1957)
- Night Light (1957)
- The Halo Is Slipping (1957)
- More Than a Match for the Navy (1958)
- The Great Amateur (1958)
- The Jazz Boy (1958)
- The Magician (1958)
- Playing on the Rainbow (1958)
- A Goat in the Garden (1958)
- Only a Waiter (1959)
- Heaven and Pancake (1959)
- Swinging at the Castle (1959)
- Crime in Paradise (1959)
- On a Bench in a Park (1960)
- Nightmare (1965)
- Woman of Darkness (1966)
- The Vicious Circle (1967)
- A Handful of Love (1974)
- City of My Dreams (1976)

== Bibliography ==
- Orr, John. The Demons of Modernity: Ingmar Bergman and European Cinema. Berghahn Books, 2014
- Stephens, Michael L. Art Directors in Cinema: A Worldwide Biographical Dictionary. McFarland, 1998.
