= Private Karlsson on Leave =

1947 film

- Directed by: Gösta Bernhard; Hugo Bolander
- Written by: Rudolf Petersson (cartoon); Gösta Bernhard; Tage Holmberg
- Starring: Gus Dahlström; Holger Höglund; Fritiof Billquist
- Cinematography: Sven Thermænius
- Edited by: Tage Holmberg
- Music by: Gunnar Johansson
- Production company: Film AB Imago
- Distributed by: Sveafilm
- Release date: 22 December 1947
- Running time: 106 minutes
- Country: Sweden
- Language: Swedish

Private Karlsson on Leave (Swedish: 91:an Karlssons permis) is a 1947 Swedish comedy film directed by Gösta Bernhard and Hugo Bolander and starring Gus Dahlström, Holger Höglund and Fritiof Billquist. It was shot at the Imagoateljéerna Studios in the Stockholm suburb of Stocksund. The film's sets were designed by the art director Arne Åkermark. It was one of eight films in a series featuring the military conscript Mandel Karlsson based on the 91:an comic strip.

== Cast ==
- Gus Dahlström as 91:an 'Mandel' Karlsson
- Holger Höglund as 87:an Axelsson
- Fritiof Billquist as Korpral Revär
- Irene Söderblom as Elvira
- John Norrman as Överste Gyllenskalp
- Douglas Håge as Major Morgonkröök
- Julia Cæsar as Fru Morgonkröök
- Thor Modéen as Major 'Jokern' Lejon
- Eric Gustafson as Johansson
- Stig Johanson as Svensson
- Gunnel Wadner as Greta

== Bibliography ==
- Sundholm, John . Historical Dictionary of Scandinavian Cinema. Scarecrow Press, 2012.
