= Harald the Stalwart =

1946 film

- Directed by: Hampe Faustman
- Written by: Paul Baudisch; Arne Bornebusch; Adolf Schütz
- Starring: George Fant; Georg Rydeberg; Elsie Albiin
- Cinematography: Felix Forsman
- Edited by: Hans Gullander
- Music by: Jules Sylvain
- Production company: Film AB Lux
- Distributed by: Film AB Lux
- Release date: 26 December 1946
- Running time: 74 minutes
- Country: Sweden
- Language: Swedish

Harald the Stalwart (Swedish: Harald Handfaste) is a 1946 Swedish historical adventure film directed by Hampe Faustman and starring George Fant, Georg Rydeberg and Elsie Albiin. It was shot at the Helsinki studios of Suomen Filmiteollisuus and on location on the island of Suomenlinna. The film's sets were designed by the art directors Bertil Duroj and Karl Fager.

== Synopsis ==
In fifteenth century Sweden a local highwaymen leads the oppressed peasantry against the tyrannical rule of a foreign bailiff. In order to seek revenge the bailiff plans to marry Karin, the rebel's beloved. When she refuses he decides instead to execute her.

== Cast ==
- George Fant as Harald Didriksson a.k.a. Harald Handfaste
- Georg Rydeberg as Von Dotzen
- Elsie Albiin as Karin Eghilsdotter
- Tord Stål as Pater Laurentius
- Gösta Gustafson as Eghil Sjunnesson
- Gunnar Olsson as Bosse
- Thor Modéen as Björnram
- Ragnar Falck as Vesslan
- Nils Hallberg as Tjuvaskata, robber
- Olle Hilding as Harald's father
- Artur Rolén as Getaskalle, robber
- Hanny Schedin as Kersti, Karin's mother
- Vera Valdor as Von Dotzen's daughter
- Wiktor Andersson as Peasant
- Hampe Faustman as Peasant
- Erik Forslund as Poor farmer
- Georg Skarstedt as Poor farmer
- Ivar Wahlgren as Poor farmer
- Gunn Wållgren as Peasant woman

== Bibliography ==
- Qvist, Per Olov & von Bagh, Peter. Guide to the Cinema of Sweden and Finland. Greenwood Publishing Group, 2000.
