= Ragnar Frisk =

Swedish film director

- Born: 15 December 1902; Hudiksvall, Sweden
- Died: 11 December 1984 (aged 81); Stockholm, Sweden
- Occupations: Film director, Actor
- Years active: 1938-1982 (film)

Ragnar Frisk (1902–1984) was a Swedish film director. He was known for his comedies, including the Åsa-Nisse series of films.

== Selected filmography ==
As director

- A Cruise in the Albertina (1938)
- Tomorrow's Melody (1942)
- Guttersnipes (1944)
- 100 dragspel och en flicka (1946)
- Åsa-Nisse (1949)
- Åsa-Nisse Goes Hunting (1950)
- Perhaps a Gentleman (1950)
- Åsa-Nisse on Holiday (1953)
- Åsa-Nisse in Military Uniform (1958)
- Åsa-Nisse as a Policeman (1960)
- 47:an Löken (1971)
- 47:an Löken blåser på! (1972)

As actor

- Andersson's Kalle on Top Form (1973)

== Bibliography ==
- John Sundholm. Historical Dictionary of Scandinavian Cinema. Scarecrow Press, 2012.
