= A Cruise in the Albertina =

1938 film

- Directed by: Per-Axel Branner
- Written by: Ragnar Frisk; Gösta Rodin
- Starring: Adolf Jahr; Signe Wirff; Olav Riégo
- Cinematography: Ernst Westerberg
- Music by: Hanns Bingang
- Production company: Svensk Talfilm
- Distributed by: Svensk Talfilm
- Release date: 14 November 1938
- Running time: 89 minutes
- Country: Sweden
- Language: Swedish

A Cruise in the Albertina (Swedish: På kryss med Albertina) is a 1938 Swedish drama film directed by Per-Axel Branner and starring Adolf Jahr, Signe Wirff and Olav Riégo. The film's sets were designed by the art director Bertil Duroj. Interiors were shot at studios in Djurgården in Stockholm. Location shooting took place in the Baltic Sea, including round Åland.

== Cast ==
- Adolf Jahr as John Andersson
- Ulla Wikander as Ann-Marie Blomberg
- Olav Riégo as Mr. Blomberg
- Signe Wirff as Mrs. Blomberg
- Åke Engfeldtas Karl-Göran Sparrholm
- Emil Fjellström as Jakob
- Otto Landahl as Kalle
- Sven-Bertil Norberg as First Mate
- Victor Thorén as Johan
- Wiola Brunius as Black Sonja
- Magnus Kesster as Lucas
- Torsten Bergström as Fredrik
- John Westin as Forwarding Agent
- Bertil Berglund as Customs Officer
- Gösta Bodin as Bartender
- Naemi Briese as Night Club Guest
- Gösta Gustafson as Customs Inspector
- Ragnar Widestedt as Man sneaking out of nightclub
- Lulu Ziegler as Night Club Singer

== Bibliography ==
- Qvist, Per Olov & von Bagh, Peter. Guide to the Cinema of Sweden and Finland. Greenwood Publishing Group, 2000.
- Wredlund, Bertil & Lindfors, Rolf. Långfilm i Sverige: 1930-1939. Proprius, 1983.
