= Rut Holm =

Swedish actress

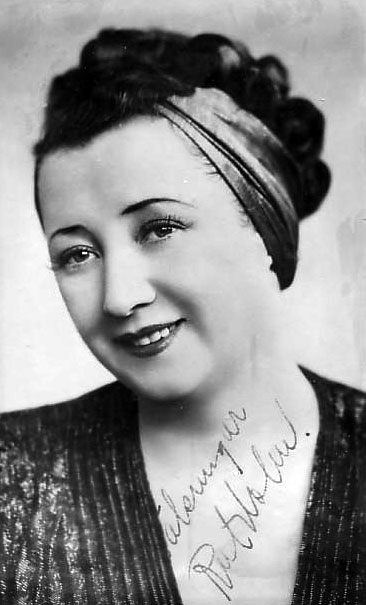
- Holm in 1940.
- Born: 10 January 1900; Avesta, Sweden
- Died: 4 July 1971 (aged 71); Stockholm, Sweden
- Occupation: Actress
- Years active: 1932–1958 (film)
- Spouse(s): Nils Dahlström (m. 1932–1935) Åke Grönberg (m. 1941–1946)

Rut Holm (1 November 1900 – 4 July 1971) was a Swedish film actress.

== Selected filmography ==
- Servant's Entrance (1932)
- The Southsiders (1932)
- Secret Svensson (1933)
- Augusta's Little Misstep (1933)
- Fridolf in the Lion's Den (1933)
- Saturday Nights (1933)
- Close Relations (1935)
- Sun Over Sweden (1938)
- We at Solglantan (1939)
- Hanna in Society (1940)
- Captured by a Voice (1943)
- The Girls in Smaland (1945)
- The Wedding on Solö (1946)
- Lars Hård (1948)
- Loffe as a Millionaire (1948)
- Carnival Evening (1948)
- Andersson's Kalle (1950)
- When Love Came to the Village (1950)
- The Motor Cavaliers (1950)
- Kalle Karlsson of Jularbo (1952)
- Sju svarta be-hå (1954)
- The Red Horses (1954)
- Far och flyg (1955)
- The Girl in Tails (1956)
- Mother Takes a Vacation (1957)
- We at Väddö (1958)

== Bibliography ==
- Rochelle Wright. The Visible Wall: Jews and Other Ethnic Outsiders in Swedish Film. SIU Press, 1998.
