= The People of Simlang Valley (1947 film) =

1947 film

- Directed by: Åke Ohberg
- Written by: Harald Beijer
- Based on: The People of Simlang Valley by Fredrik Ström
- Produced by: Åke Ohberg
- Starring: Edvin Adolphson; Eva Dahlbeck; Arthur Fischer
- Cinematography: Göran Strindberg
- Edited by: Lennart Wallén
- Music by: Erland von Koch
- Production company: Nordisk Tonefilm
- Distributed by: Nordisk Tonefilm
- Release date: 26 December 1947
- Running time: 89 minutes
- Country: Sweden
- Language: Swedish

The People of Simlang Valley (Swedish: Folket i Simlångsdalen) is a 1947 Swedish drama film directed by Åke Ohberg and starring Edvin Adolphson, Eva Dahlbeck and Arthur Fischer. The film's sets were designed by the art director Bibi Lindström. It is based on the 1903 novel The People of Simlang Valley by Fredrik Ström, which had previously been adapted into a 1924 silent film of the same title.

== Cast ==
- Edvin Adolphson as Stig Folkesson
- Eva Dahlbeck as Ingrid Folkesson
- Arthur Fischer as Brand
- Signe Wirff as Mrs. Brand
- Kenne Fant as Sven Brand
- Barbro Nordin as Marit
- Peter Lindgren as Tattar-Jan
- Carl Ström as Sibelius
- Sven Bergvall as Vicar
- Nils Hallberg as Häst-Jonke
- Josua Bengtson as Klånkan
- Naima Wifstrand as Skoga-Börta
- Fylgia Zadig as Fia
- Emmy Albiin as Marsgård Farmer's Wife
- Torgny Anderberg as Farmhand
- Astrid Bodin as Waitress at the inn
- Harald Emanuelsson as Alarik
- David Erikson as Marshall
- Knut Frankman as Eriksson
- Sune Högberg as Accordion Player
- Einar Lindholm as Anton Nilsson
- John Melin as Customer
- John Norrman as Marsgård Farmer
- Birger Sahlberg as Peasant at the inn
- Nina Scenna as Malin
- Georg Skarstedt as Bell Ringer
- Ivar Wahlgren as Ola
- Tom Walter as Gypsy
- Lillie Wästfeldt as Maid
- Erik Forslund as Folkesson's farm hand

== Bibliography ==
- Qvist, Per Olov & von Bagh, Peter. Guide to the Cinema of Sweden and Finland. Greenwood Publishing Group, 2000.
