= Britta Brunius =

Swedish actress

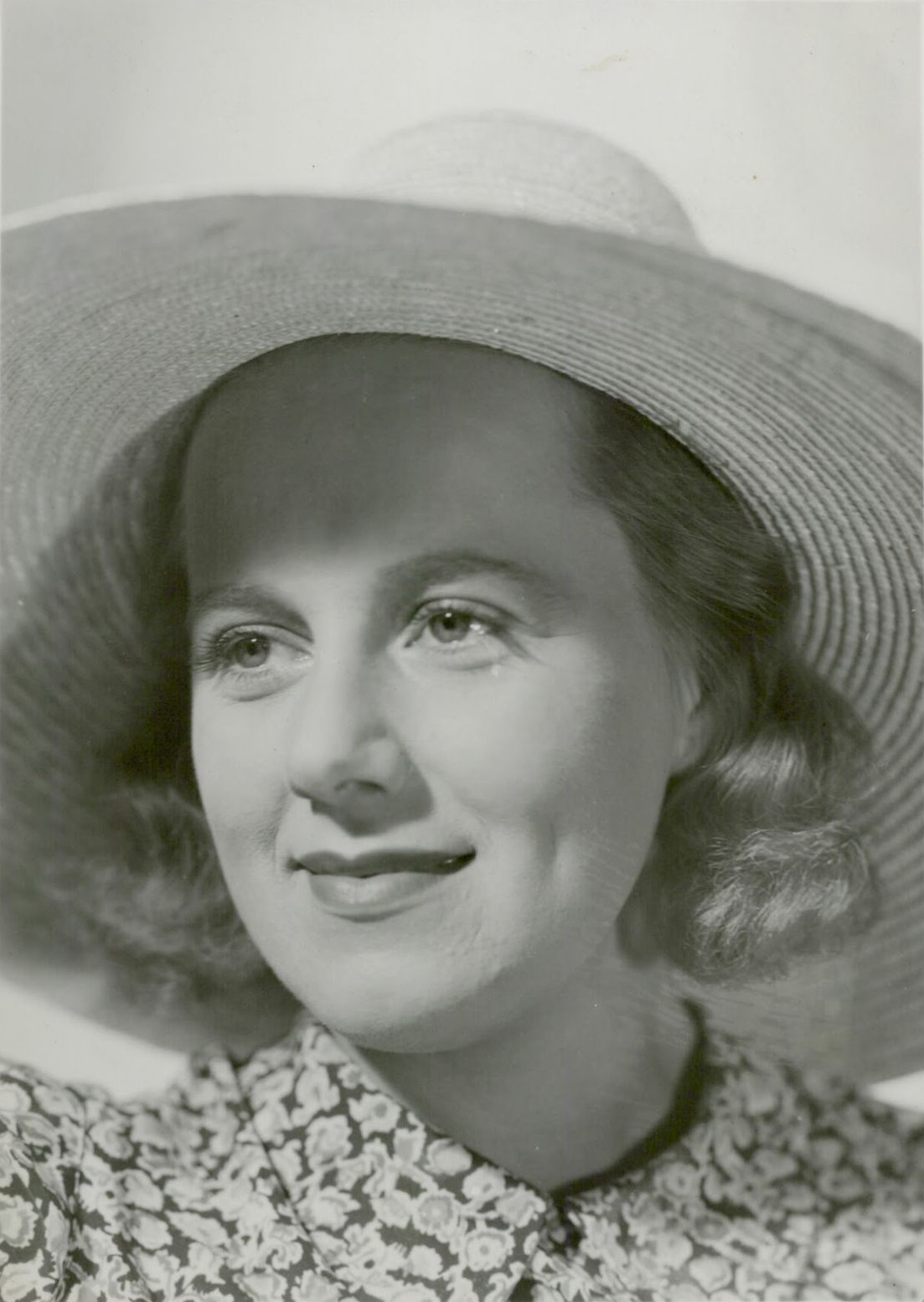
- Born: 4 May 1912; Stockholm, Sweden
- Died: 31 August 2000 (aged 88); Stockholm, Sweden
- Occupation: Actress
- Years active: 1935–1969

Britta Brunius (4 May 1912 – 31 August 2000) was a Swedish film actress. She appeared in more than 30 films between 1935 and 1969. She was married to the actor Ragnar Falck.

== Selected filmography ==
- The Boys of Number Fifty Seven (1935)
- We at Solglantan (1939)
- Bashful Anton (1940)
- I Am Fire and Air (1944)
- Guttersnipes (1944)
- The Invisible Wall (1944)
- Music in Darkness (1948)
- She Came Like the Wind (1952)
- Speed Fever (1953)
- A Night in the Archipelago (1953)
- Men in the Dark (1955)
- The Hard Game (1956)
- The Lady in White (1962)
- The Passion of Anna (1969)
