= Andersson's Kalle (1950 film) =

1950 film

- Poster featuring future star Harriet Andersson along with the title character Kalle (Peter Blitz).
- Directed by: Rolf Husberg
- Written by: Sven Zetterström; Kar de Mumma
- Based on: Andersson's Kalle by Emil Norlander
- Produced by: Carlo Fridlund
- Starring: Kai Gullmar; Harriet Andersson; Rut Holm
- Cinematography: Curt Jonsson
- Edited by: Lennart Wallén
- Music by: Kai Gullmar; Sune Waldimir
- Production company: Wivefilm
- Distributed by: Wivefilm
- Release date: 21 November 1950
- Running time: 87 minutes
- Country: Sweden
- Language: Swedish

Andersson's Kalle (Swedish: Anderssonskans Kalle) is a 1950 Swedish comedy film directed by Rolf Husberg and starring Kai Gullmar, Harriet Andersson and Rut Holm. The film's sets were designed by the art director Bibi Lindström. It is based on the novel of the same title by Emil Norlander, which has been adapted into films on several occasions.

== Synopsis ==
Kalle is a young boy from the Södermalm district of Stockholm who love playing practical jokes. His widowed mother feels that he is just showing youthful high spirits but others in the neighbourhood, including the local police officer, strongly disagree. Meanwhile, his elder sister Majken is being courted by two suitors.

== Cast ==
- Peter Blitz as Anderssonskans Kalle
- Kai Gullmar as Anderssonskan
- Harriet Andersson as Majken
- Mona Geijer-Falkner as Bobergskan
- Rut Holm as Pihlgrenskan
- Bellan Roos as Lövdalskan
- Hanny Schedin as Petterssonskan
- Arne Källerud as Konstapel Jonsson
- Lars Ekborg as Gustav
- Henrik Schildt as Helling
- John Botvid as Korv-Agust
- Artur Rolén as Kol-Karlsson
- Bo Lennart Olsson as Allan
- Sven Magnusson as Jocke
- Wiktor Andersson as Fish Poacher
- Percy Brandt as Allan Berg
- Bertil Bronner as Helling's Companion
- Knut Frankman as Fisherman
- Lars Hummerhielm as Pelle
- Stig Johanson as Erik
- Magnus Kesster as Editor
- Torsten Lilliecrona as Helling's Companion
- Carl-Gustaf Lindstedt as Illegal Fisher
- Emy Storm as Lady at Party
- Bengt Sundmark as Crook
- Carin Swensson as Maria Jansson
- Tom Walter as Crook
- Ingrid Östergren as Summer Camp Manager

== Bibliography ==
- Qvist, Per Olov & von Bagh, Peter. Guide to the Cinema of Sweden and Finland. Greenwood Publishing Group, 2000.
- Segrave, Kerry & Martin, Linda. The Continental Actress: European Film Stars of the Postwar Era--biographies, Criticism, Filmographies, Bibliographies. McFarland, 1990.
