= In Darkest Smaland =

1943 film by Schamyl Bauman

- Directed by: Schamyl Bauman
- Written by: Albert Engström (novels); Schamyl Bauman; Erik Lundegård; Torsten Lundqvist
- Produced by: Ragnar Arvedson
- Starring: Sigurd Wallén; Emil Fjellström; Gull Natorp
- Cinematography: Olle Nordemar; Sven Nykvist
- Edited by: Lennart Wallén
- Music by: Gunnar Johansson; Jules Sylvain
- Production company: Bauman-Produktion
- Distributed by: Sandrew-Baumanfilm
- Release date: 25 October 1943
- Running time: 73 minutes
- Country: Sweden
- Language: Swedish

In Darkest Smaland (Swedish: I mörkaste Småland) is a 1943 Swedish comedy film directed by Schamyl Bauman and starring Sigurd Wallén, Emil Fjellström and Gull Natorp. It was shot at the Centrumateljéerna Studios in Stockholm. The film's sets were designed by the art director Allan Egnell.

== Cast ==
- Sigurd Wallén as Johannes / Narrator
- Emil Fjellström as Cornelius
- Gull Natorp as Kristin
- Eivor Landström as Mari
- Peter Höglund as Alfred
- Gideon Wahlberg as Policeman
- Theodor Berthels as Erkas
- Carl Barcklind as Judge
- Carl Hagman as Dr. Lind
- John Botvid as Johannes' father
- Wiktor Andersson as Const. Söderkvist
- Nils Hallberg as Erkas' son
- Lennart Pilotti as Erkas' son
- Erik A. Petschler asCircus manager
- Ernst Brunman as Magnus
- Kaj Hjelm as Johannes' son
- Albin Erlandson as Lars-Ola
- Ingemar Holde as Karlsson
- Artur Cederborgh as Station master
- Arne Lindblad as Circus staff
- Birger Sahlberg as Merchant
- Torsten Hillberg as Lieutenant at Ränneslätt
- Aurore Palmgren as Old woman
- Mona Geijer-Falkner as Workhouse inmate
- Wilma Malmlöf as Woman at the poor-house
- Lisa Wirström as Woman at the poor-house
- Anna-Stina Wåglund as Lady at the market
- Gudrun Folmer-Hansen as Circus cashier
- Knut Frankman as Man at the poor-house
- Rudolf Svensson as Circus athlete
- Artur Rolén as . Merchant
- Hartwig Fock as Man buying butter at the market
- Karl Erik Flens as Conscript
- Bror Abelli as Vicar
- Folke Algotsson as Man at the market
- Gunnar Almqvist as Man in courtroom
- Margit Andelius as Telephone operator
- Olga Andersson as Mrs. Lind
- Julia Cæsar as Lady at the dance
- John Elfström as Fighter at the dance
- Millan Fjellström as Woman outside the poor-house
- Jack Gill as Accordion player
- Hjördis Gille as Emma
- Viktor Haak as Man at the dance
- Carl Harald as Man at the market
- Carin Lundquist as Woman at the market
- Hugo Lundström as Man outside the poor-house
- Curt Löwgren as Conscript
- John Melin as Innkeeper
- Gösta Qvist as Karlsson
- Gabriel Rosén as Corporal
- Jan-Olof Rydqvist as Johannes' second son
- Victor Thorén as Schoolteacher

== Bibliography ==
- Wallengren, Ann-Kristin. Welcome Home Mr Swanson: Swedish Emigrants and Swedishness on Film. Nordic Academic Press, 2014.
