= Gunnar Olsson (actor) =

Swedish actor

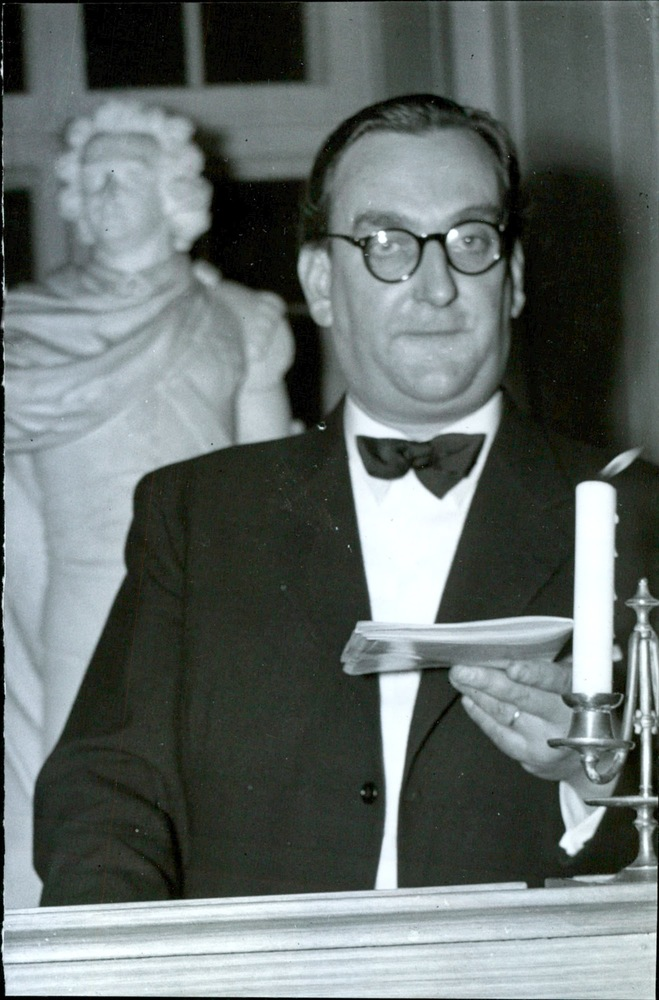
- Gunnar Olsson, 1947.
- Born: 10 July 1904; Oxelösund, Sweden
- Died: 16 September 1983 (aged 79); Sweden
- Occupation: Actor
- Years active: 1933–1974

Gunnar Olsson (10 July 1904 – 16 September 1983) was a Swedish film actor and director. He was born in Oxelösund, Sweden.

== Partial filmography ==
=== Actor ===
- En melodi om våren (1933) - Delling
- Perhaps a Poet (1933) - Viding
- Tystnadens hus (1933) - Count von Elbing
- The Atlantic Adventure (1934) - Bob Holgert, Machinist
- Marodörer (1934) - Räven
- Järnets män (1935) - Engineer (uncredited)
- Flickor på fabrik (1935) - Erik Löfstedt
- Alla tiders Karlsson (1936) - Film Director
- Bombi Bitt och jag (1936) - Nils Gallilé
- The Two of Us (1939) - Bogren (uncredited)
- ...som en tjuv om natten (1940) - Gren
- Hanna in Society (1940) - Sundin (uncredited)
- Lucky Young Lady (1941) - Salesman
- The Case of Ingegerd Bremssen (1942) - Nilsson
- Blizzard (1944) - Kristoffer
- The Old Clock at Ronneberga (1944) - Clock salesman
- The Happy Tailor (1945) - Parish constable (uncredited)
- Harald the Stalwart (1946) - Bosse
- Vagabond Blacksmiths (1949) - Lind
- The Girl from the Third Row (1949) - Lilja, Jeweller
- Bohus Battalion (1949) - Sebastian Tonérus
- Skipper in Stormy Weather (1951) - Birger Birgersson
- Summer Interlude (1951) - The Priest
- Vägen till Klockrike (1953) - Ahlbom, cigar maker
- Stupid Bom (1953) - Julius, gardener
- Seger i mörker (1954) - Anders Persson
- Young Summer (1954) - Cantor
- Laugh Bomb (1954) - Professor Planius
- Gabrielle (1954) - Engkvist (uncredited)
- Voyage in the Night (1955) - Johan - Britt-Marie's Father
- The Seventh Seal (1957) - Albertus Pictor, Church Painter
- Gårdarna runt sjön (1957) - Gardener
- Som man bäddar... (1957) - Professor
- No Tomorrow (1957) - Toivo Hietari
- Wild Strawberries (1957) - Bishop (uncredited)
- Woman in a Fur Coat (1958) - Forensic Chemist
- The Jazz Boy (1958) - Paul Merzbach, filmregissören
- Pirates on the Malonen (1959) - Karl Scholke
- A Lion in Town (1959) - Pawn Broker
- On a Bench in a Park (1960) - Vicar (uncredited)
- The Mistress (1962) - The Old Man (uncredited)
- Adamsson i Sverige (1966) - Persson
- Deadline (1971) - Kent-Arne's Father
- Gangsterfilmen (1974) - Karl

=== Director ===
- The People of Bergslagen (1937)
- We at Solglantan (1939)
- Lasse-Maja (1941)
- Adventurer (1942)
- Turn of the Century (1944)
- Skipper in Stormy Weather (1951)
