= Augusta's Little Misstep =

1933 film

- Directed by: Thor Modéen
- Written by: Siegfried Fischer (play); Thor Modéen
- Produced by: Stellan Claësson
- Starring: Edvard Persson; Dagmar Ebbesen; Aino Taube
- Cinematography: Martin Bodin
- Music by: Gunnar Johansson
- Production company: Ekfilm
- Distributed by: Ekfilm
- Release date: 30 January 1933
- Running time: 78 minutes
- Country: Sweden
- Language: Swedish

Augusta's Little Misstep (Swedish: Augustas lilla felsteg) is a 1933 Swedish comedy film directed by Thor Modéen and starring Edvard Persson, Dagmar Ebbesen and Aino Taube. It was shot at the Råsunda Studios in Stockholm. The film's sets were designed by the art director Arne Åkermark.

== Cast ==
- Edvard Persson as Smulle Månsson
- Dagmar Ebbesen as Mrs. Augusta Magnusson
- Aino Taube as Ingrid Månsson
- Thor Modéen as Holger Jönsgård
- Arthur Fischer as Fabrikör Hagström
- Siegfried Fischer as David Magnusson
- Rut Holm as Lisa Magnusson
- Hugo Jacobsson as Petter Söderkvist
- Nils Jacobsson as Einar Hallbäck
- Thyra Leijman-Uppström as Mrs. Klara Månsson
- Werner Ohlson as Helge Hagström
- Carl Ericson as Brevbärare
- Helge Kihlberg as Biljettförsäljare
- Margareta Schönström as Kontorsflicka
- Harald Wehlnor as Unpleasant passenger

== Bibliography ==
- Larsson, Mariah & Marklund, Anders. Swedish Film: An Introduction and Reader. Nordic Academic Press, 2010.
- Qvist, Per Olov & von Bagh, Peter. Guide to the Cinema of Sweden and Finland. Greenwood Publishing Group, 2000.
