= Son of the Sea =

1949 Swedish film

- Directed by: Rolf Husberg
- Written by: Theodor Berthels; Rolf Husberg
- Produced by: Olle Nordemar
- Starring: Per Oscarsson; Dagny Lind; John Elfström
- Cinematography: Hilding Bladh; Curt Jonsson
- Edited by: Rolf Husberg
- Music by: Erland von Koch
- Production company: Sandrews
- Distributed by: Sandrew-Baumanfilm
- Release date: 13 October 1949
- Running time: 80 minutes
- Country: Sweden
- Language: Swedish

Son of the Sea (Swedish: Havets son) is a 1949 Swedish drama film directed by Rolf Husberg and starring Per Oscarsson, Dagny Lind and John Elfström. It was shot at the Centrumateljéerna Studios in Stockholm. The film's sets were designed by the art director P.A. Lundgren.

== Cast ==
- Per Oscarsson as Rolf Bakken
- Dagny Lind as Sigrid Bakken
- John Elfström as Jockum
- Barbro Nordin as Solveig Moen
- Willie Sjöberg as Harald Björhus
- Axel Högel as Hagen, priest
- Ingrid Thulin as Gudrun
- Christian Bratt as Tove Ericsen
- Nils Hallberg as Håkan Haraldsen
- Albin Erlandzon as Kåre
- Svea Holst as Inga Björhus
- Karin Högel as Brita Hagen
- Magnus Kesster as Sten
- Gunnar Lundin as Gunnar Björhus
- Eric Malmberg as Nielsen
- Wilma Malmlöf as Gammel-Kerstin
- Aurore Palmgren as Mrs. Hansen
- Georg Skarstedt as Lukas, 'Tröj'
- Birger Åsander as Per Haraldsen
- Brita Öberg as Waitress at Hotel Lofoten
- Eric Laurent as Priest in Svolvær

== Bibliography ==
- Qvist, Per Olov & von Bagh, Peter. Guide to the Cinema of Sweden and Finland. Greenwood Publishing Group, 2000.
