= Doris Svedlund =

Swedish actress

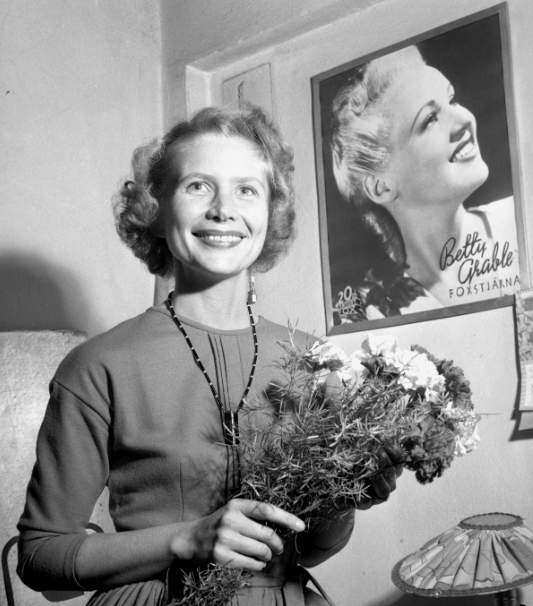
- Svedlund in 1955
- Born: 11 December 1926; Stockholm, Sweden
- Died: 7 September 1985 (aged 58); Sweden
- Occupation: Actress
- Years active: 1946-1986

Doris Svedlund (11 December 1926 – 7 September 1985) was a Swedish film actress. She starred in Ingmar Bergman's 1948 film Prison, and in the 1951 film Divorced, which Bergman wrote.

== Partial filmography ==
- When the Meadows Blossom (1946)
- Prison (1949)
- Vagabond Blacksmiths (1949)
- Bohus Battalion (1949)
- The White Cat (1950)
- Divorced (1951)
- Love (1952)
- Blondie, Beef and the Banana (1952)
- Encounter with Life (1952)
- Café Lunchrasten (1954)
- Our Father and the Gypsy (1954)
- Violence (1955)
- Paradise (1955)
- Moon Over Hellesta (1956)
- Encounters in the Twilight (1957)
