= Music in Darkness =

1947 film by Ingmar Bergman

- Swedish cover
- Directed by: Ingmar Bergman
- Screenplay by: Ingmar Bergman; Dagmar Edqvist
- Based on: Music in Darkness by Dagmar Edqvist
- Produced by: Lorens Marmstedt
- Starring: Mai Zetterling; Birger Malmsten
- Cinematography: Göran Strindberg
- Edited by: Lennart Wallén
- Music by: Erland von Koch
- Production company: Terrafilms Produktions AB
- Distributed by: Terrafilm, Stjärnfilm
- Release date: 17 January 1948
- Running time: 87 minutes
- Country: Sweden
- Language: Swedish

Music in Darkness (Swedish: Musik i mörker), known in the United States as Night Is My Future, is a 1948 Swedish drama film directed by Ingmar Bergman from a screenplay he co-wrote with Dagmar Edqvist, based on Edqvist's novel of the same name. The theme of blindness and of a blind's person subjective experience plays a major role in the psychological study depicted in the film. Bergman was deeply passionate about music and once said, "If I had to choose between losing my eyes or ears—I would keep my ears. I can't imagine anything more terrible than to have my music taken away from me."

== Plot ==
Talented pianist Bengt Vyldeke loses his sight after being accidentally shot during a military exercise. Bengt is gripped by increasing bitterness and develops a relationship with Ingrid, a lower-class girl employed as a servant in the home of Bengt's parents.

== Cast ==
- Mai Zetterling as Ingrid
- Birger Malmsten as Bengt Vyldeke
- Rune Andréasson as Evert
- Ulla Andreasson as Sylvia
- Gunnar Björnstrand as Klasson
- Hilda Borgström as Lovisa
- Britta Brunius as A woman
- Åke Claesson as Augustin Schröder
- Bengt Eklund as Ebbe
- John Elfström as Otto Klemens
- Barbro Flodquist as Hjördis
- Mona Geijer-Falkner as Woman at the garbage can
- Marianne Gyllenhammar as Blanche
- Douglas Håge as Kruge
- Svea Holst as Post office worker
- Stig Johanson as A man
- Sven Lindberg as Hedström
- Arne Lindblad as The Chef
- Bengt Logardt as Einar Born
- Segol Mann as Anton Nord
- Georg Skarstedt as Joensson
- Bibi Skoglund as Agneta
- Reinhold Svensson as Man in bar
- Naima Wifstrand as Mrs. Schroeder
- Olof Winnerstrand as The Vicar
