= Big Lasse of Delsbo =

1949 film

- Directed by: Ivar Johansson
- Written by: Ivar Johansson
- Produced by: Inge Ivarson
- Starring: Sten Lindgren; Anna Lindahl; Ulla Andreasson
- Cinematography: Sven Nykvist
- Edited by: Ivar Johansson
- Music by: Charles Redland
- Production company: Kungsfilm
- Release date: 29 October 1949
- Running time: 100 minutes
- Country: Sweden
- Language: Swedish

Big Lasse of Delsbo (Swedish: Lång-Lasse i Delsbo) is a 1949 Swedish historical drama film directed by Ivar Johansson and starring Sten Lindgren, Anna Lindahl and Ulla Andreasson. It was shot at the Centrumateljéerna Studios in Stockholm. The film's sets were designed by the art director P.A. Lundgren. It was inspired by real historical events in nineteenth century Sweden.

== Synopsis ==
In Delsbo in the 1840s, the new preacher Lars Landgren (known to his parishioners as Big Lasse) tries to battle moral decline in the area after being called in by concerned locals.

== Cast ==
- Sten Lindgren as Lars Landgren
- Anna Lindahl as Mrs. Matilda Landgren
- Ulla Andreasson as Margit Bryngel
- Peter Lindgren as Klas Hägglund
- Arthur Fischer as Tratt-Lasse Bryngel
- Nils Hultgren as Mickel Hansson
- Axel Högel as Tuvesson Sr.
- Eric Laurent as Näslund
- Wilma Malmlöf as Lotta Bryngel
- Erik Sundqvist as Björn Tuvesson
- Margit Andelius as Mrs. Näslund
- Torgny Anderberg as Halvar i Bakmossen
- Marianne Anderberg as Hästskojar-Nisse's wife
- Per-Axel Arosenius as Ekstedt
- Josua Bengtson as Tjyv-Pelle
- Greta Berthels as Brännar-Antes käring
- Astrid Bodin as Klas Hägglund's mother
- Helga Brofeldt as Björn's Mother
- Julia Cæsar as Bickering woman
- John Ekman as Brännar-Ante
- Sture Ericson as Friend of Tratt-Lasse
- Albin Erlandzon as Skinnar-Jonte
- Tyra Fischer as Skinnar-Jonte's wife
- Siegfried Fischer as Per Olsson i Överälven
- Ivar Hallbäck as Erik Jansson, priest
- Gustaf Hiort af Ornäs as Unmarried man interrogated by Landgren
- Lissi Alandh as Unmarried woman interrogated by Landgren
- Adèle Lundvall as Johanna
- Erik Molin as Hästskojar-Nisse
- Bellan Roos as Bickering woman's niece
- Edla Rothgardt as Woman at Skinnar-Jonte
- Nina Scenna as Immoral woman
- Hanny Schedin as Malena i Rismyra
- Georg Skarstedt as Kjellstedt, school inspector
- Erik Sundquist as Visitor to Landgren
- Ivar Wahlgren as Doctor
- Maud Walter as Woman
- Tom Walter as Olle Pryl
- Birger Åsander as Pelle Borst
- Alf Östlund as Hägglund Sr.
- Emmy Albiin as Petter's Wife
- Erik Forslund as Petter i Lilltorp

== Bibliography ==
- Qvist, Per Olov & von Bagh, Peter. Guide to the Cinema of Sweden and Finland. Greenwood Publishing Group, 2000.
- Wright, Rochelle. The Visible Wall: Jews and Other Ethnic Outsiders in Swedish Film. SIU Press, 1998.
