= Brita Öberg =

Swedish actress

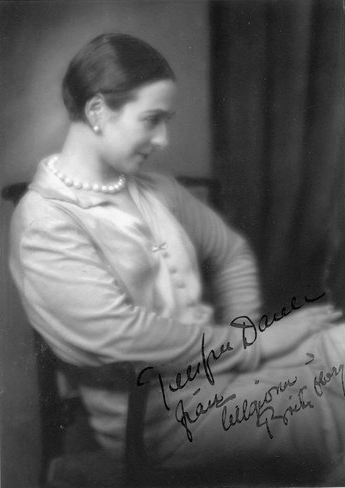
- Born: 22 May 1900
- Died: 26 December 1969 (aged 69); Stockholm, Sweden
- Occupation: Actress
- Years active: 1931-1969

Brita Öberg (22 May 1900 – 26 December 1969) was a Swedish actress. She appeared in more than 40 films between 1931 and 1969.

== Selected filmography ==
- Kristin Commands (1946)
- Between Brothers (1946)
- Son of the Sea (1949)
- Storm Over Tjurö (1954)
- Luffaren och Rasmus (1955)
- Men in the Dark (1955)
- Moon Over Hellesta (1956)
- The Minister of Uddarbo (1957)
- A Dreamer's Journey (1957)
- No Tomorrow (1957)
- Åsa-Nisse in Military Uniform (1958)
- Åsa-Nisse as a Policeman (1960)
- Ormen (1966)
- Rooftree (1967)
- The Passion of Anna (1969)
