= Bengt Linder =

Swedish writer and journalist (1929–1985)

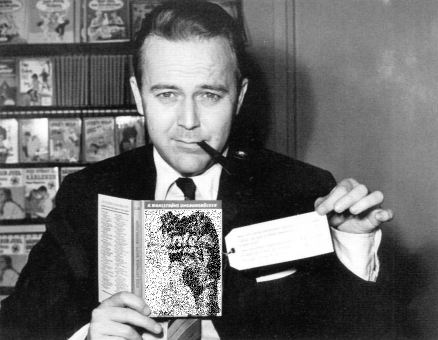
- Linder in 1966, holding a book from his Dante series
- Born: Bengt Gunnar Sigurd Linder; July 26, 1929; Härnösand, Sweden
- Died: April 17, 1985 (aged 55); Lidingö, Sweden
- Occupations: Writer and journalist

Bengt Gunnar Sigurd Linder (26 July 1929 in Härnösand - 17 April 1985 in Lidingö) was a Swedish writer and journalist. He wrote approximately 100 books for children and young adults, as well as text for revues and entertainment programs for radio and TV.

== Work ==
Linder wrote in a very colloquial style, and his books are characterised by rapid dialogue and a fast pace.

He also wrote the manuscripts for a few Swedish films, such as Kostervalsen from 1958 and Drömpojken from 1964. In 1978 he wrote the script for a film based on one of his own books from 1967, called Dante - akta're för Hajen!. The movie was not well received by critics, who characterised it as incoherent and illogical.
