= Arthur Fischer (actor) =

Swedish actor

- Born: 2 November 1897; Stockholm, Sweden
- Died: 3 December 1991 (aged 94); Stockholm, Sweden
- Occupation: Actor
- Years active: 1933-1977

Arthur Fischer (2 November 1897 – 3 December 1991) was a Swedish actor. He appeared in more than 90 films between 1933 and 1977.

== Selected filmography ==
- Augusta's Little Misstep (1933)
- The Count of the Old Town (1935)
- The Boys of Number Fifty Seven (1935)
- The Andersson Family (1937)
- Mother Gets Married (1937)
- Hotel Paradise (1937)
- Baldwin's Wedding (1938)
- Storm Over the Skerries (1938)
- Whalers (1939)
- Bashful Anton (1940)
- Goransson's Boy (1941)
- The Ghost Reporter (1941)
- Sun Over Klara (1942)
- The Yellow Clinic (1942)
- Tomorrow's Melody (1942)
- Skipper Jansson (1944)
- Widower Jarl (1945)
- The Österman Brothers' Virago (1945)
- Between Brothers (1946)
- Kvarterets olycksfågel (1947)
- Rail Workers (1947)
- The People of Simlang Valley (1947)
- Two Women (1947)
- Carnival Evening (1948)
- Dangerous Spring (1949)
- The Devil and the Smalander (1949)
- Big Lasse of Delsbo (1949)
- Father Bom (1949)
- The Realm of the Rye (1950)
- Living on 'Hope' (1951)
- Skipper in Stormy Weather (1951)
- In Lilac Time (1952)
- Kalle Karlsson of Jularbo (1952)
- Speed Fever (1953)
- Ursula, the Girl from the Finnish Forests (1953)
- Taxi 13 (1954)
- Simon the Sinner (1954)
- The Biscuit (1956)
- The Song of the Scarlet Flower (1956)
- The Halo Is Slipping (1957)
- Fridolf Stands Up! (1958)
- We at Väddö (1958)
- Heart's Desire (1960)
- Sten Stensson Returns (1963)
