= Perhaps a Gentleman (1950 film) =

1950 film

- Directed by: Ragnar Frisk
- Written by: Theodor Berthels; Berndt Carlberg; Ulla Kåge
- Based on: Pygmalion by George Bernard Shaw
- Produced by: Gösta Sandin
- Starring: John Elfström; Stig Järrel; Marianne Löfgren
- Cinematography: Frank Dalin
- Edited by: Ragnar Engström
- Music by: Sven Rüno
- Production company: Svensk Talfilm
- Distributed by: Svensk Talfilm
- Release date: 26 December 1950
- Running time: 91 minutes
- Country: Sweden
- Language: Swedish

Perhaps a Gentleman (Swedish: Kanske en gentleman) is a 1950 Swedish comedy film directed by Ragnar Frisk and starring John Elfström, Stig Järrel and Marianne Löfgren. It is a remake of a 1935 film of the same title, itself inspired by George Bernard Shaw's play Pygmalion. The film's sets were designed by the art director Bertil Duroj.

== Synopsis ==
A director and an actor have a bet that they can turn a lowlife from the streets into a gentleman in just two months.

== Cast ==
- John Elfström as Gurra Lind
- Stig Järrel as Stig Järrel
- Marianne Löfgren as Mrs. Haglund
- Gösta Cederlund as Eric Haglund
- Emy Hagman as Lisa
- Sten Gester as Björn
- Harriett Philipson as Vera
- Folke Hamrin as Bergstrand
- Lillie Wästfeldt as Malin
- Georg Skarstedt as Benster
- Dagmar Olsson as Sara
- Magnus Kesster as Loan Shark
- Helga Brofeldt as Ingeborg Hagström
- Arne Lindblad as Rydberg
- John Norrman as Berra

== Bibliography ==
- Krawc, Alfred. International Directory of Cinematographers, Set- and Costume Designers in Film: Denmark, Finland, Norway, Sweden (from the beginnings to 1984). Saur, 1986.
- Semenza, Greg M. Colón & Hasenfratz, Bob . The History of British Literature on Film, 1895-2015. Bloomsbury Publishing, 2015.
