= John Elfström =

Swedish actor (1902–1981)

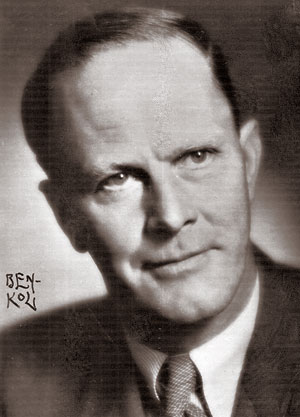
- Born: Per Johan Hilding Elfström; 20 April 1902; Ovansjö, Sweden–Norway
- Died: 27 March 1981 (aged 78); Skarpäng, Täby Municipality, Stockholm County, Sweden
- Occupation: Actor
- Years active: 1933–1971
- Spouse(s): Ulla Österberg (m. 1933; div. 1945) Inga-Lisa Brit (m. 1970)
- Partner: Maria Küpper
- Children: Jeanette Gardner (with Küpper)

Per Johan Hilding "John" Elfström (20 April 1902 – 27 March 1981) was a Swedish film actor who appeared in more than 120 films. He is most famous for starring in the Åsa-Nisse series of films. He primarily made lighter comedies, sometimes also appearing in heavier contexts. Ingmar Bergman had him play the blind worker in Music in Darkness (1948), and in Arne Mattsson's One Summer of Happiness (1951) he played an unpleasant priest. He was born in Ovansjö (present Sandviken Municipality, Sweden, grew up in Aspås and died in Täby.

== Selected filmography ==
- People of Hälsingland (1933)
- Simon of Backabo (1934)
- Conscientious Objector Adolf (1936)
- Fransson the Terrible (1941)
- The Talk of the Town (1941)
- Goransson's Boy (1941)
- Poor Ferdinand (1941)
- She Thought It Was Him (1943)
- In Darkest Smaland (1943)
- The Forest Is Our Heritage (1944)
- The Emperor of Portugallia (1944)
- Oss tjuvar emellan eller En burk ananas (1945)
- The Rose of Tistelön (1945)
- The Girls in Smaland (1945)
- The Österman Brothers' Virago (1945)
- Kristin Commands (1946)
- The Wedding on Solö (1946)
- Peggy on a Spree (1946)
- Life in the Finnish Woods (1947)
- Rail Workers (1947)
- Music in Darkness (1948)
- Vagabond Blacksmiths (1949)
- Son of the Sea (1949)
- Åsa-Nisse (1949)
- Åsa-Nisse Goes Hunting (1950)
- Perhaps a Gentleman (1950)
- While the City Sleeps (1950)
- One Summer of Happiness (1951)
- In Lilac Time (1952)
- The Clang of the Pick (1952)
- Defiance (1952)
- Åsa-Nisse on Holiday (1953)
- The Yellow Squadron (1954)
- Our Father and the Gypsy (1954)
- A Lesson in Love (1954)
- People of the Finnish Forests (1955)
- The Hard Game (1956)
- Åsa-Nisse in Military Uniform (1958)
- We at Väddö (1958)
- Åsa-Nisse as a Policeman (1960)
- The Lustful Vicar (1970)
