= Mona Geijer-Falkner =

Swedish actress (1887–1973)

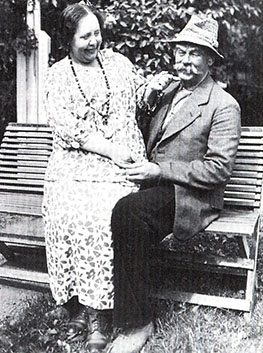
- Geijer-Falkner with Hugo Jacobsson in 1936
- Born: 2 January 1887; Stockholm, Sweden
- Died: 3 December 1973 (aged 86); Stockholm, Sweden
- Occupation: Actress
- Years active: 1920-1969

Mona Geijer-Falkner (2 January 1887 – 3 December 1973) was a Swedish film actress. She appeared in more than 100 films between 1920 and 1969.

She entered the Operans Balettelevskola by 1894. One of her early film roles was in The Outlaw and His Wife (1918). She died in Stockholm at the age of 87 on 3 December 1973.

== Selected filmography ==
- The Rivals (1926)
- Getting Married (1926)
- Frida's Songs (1930)
- Skipper's Love (1931)
- The Southsiders (1932)
- International Match (1932)
- Black Roses (1932)
- Saturday Nights (1933)
- Simon of Backabo (1934)
- Andersson's Kalle (1934)
- Swedenhielms (1935)
- The Girls of Uppakra (1936)
- Witches' Night (1937)
- We at Solglantan (1939)
- The Fight Continues (1941)
- The Talk of the Town (1941)
- There's a Fire Burning (1943)
- In Darkest Smaland (1943)
- Count Only the Happy Moments (1944)
- The Journey Away (1945)
- The Girls in Smaland (1945)
- Dynamite (1947)
- Music in Darkness (1948)
- Life at Forsbyholm Manor (1948)
- Robinson in Roslagen (1948)
- Only a Mother (1949)
- Father Bom (1949)
- Åsa-Nisse (1949)
- Teacher's First Born (1950)
- Andersson's Kalle (1950)
- My Name Is Puck (1951)
- Love (1952)
- Åsa-Nisse on Holiday (1953)
- Unmarried Mothers (1953)
- The Yellow Squadron (1954)
- Whoops! (1955)
- Seventh Heaven (1956)
- Stage Entrance (1956)
- Åsa-Nisse in Military Uniform (1958)
- A Lion in Town (1959)
- Åsa-Nisse as a Policeman (1960)
- Two Living, One Dead (1961)
- Lovely Is the Summer Night (1961)
- Ticket to Paradise (1962)
- The Lady in White (1962)
- Sten Stensson Returns (1963)
