= Åsa-Nisse =

Literary character created by Stig Cederholm

Åsa-Nisse is a Swedish literary character created by Stig Cederholm. The character first appeared in the weekly magazine Tidsfördrif in 1944, and later in a series of 20 films, produced between 1949 and 1969. In 1960 it also became a comic series, which is still produced and published periodically in its own magazine. A new Åsa-Nisse film was released in 2011.

== Concept ==
The character Åsa-Nisse, literally Nils on the Ridge or Ridge-Nisse, is a somewhat elderly man living with his wife Eulalia on a farm in the countryside village of Knohult in Småland. To the dismay of his wife, Åsa-Nisse never really seems to produce an honest day's work, and instead his activities seem to focus on various antics where he is accompanied by his friend and side-kick Klabbarparn. One of their favourite activities is poaching, while managing to stay one step ahead of the law, personified by the local policeman. Other characters include Knohultarn and Sjökvist, the local merchant. Much of the humor, particularly in the original stories, is derived from the characters' peculiar dialect.

== Adaptations ==
=== Comics ===
In 1944 the character was adapted into a comic strip drawn by Gösta Gummesson, with dialogue written by various authors including Gits Olsson, Bengt Linder, Leif Bergendorff, Olle Nilsson and Pidde Andersson.

=== Films ===
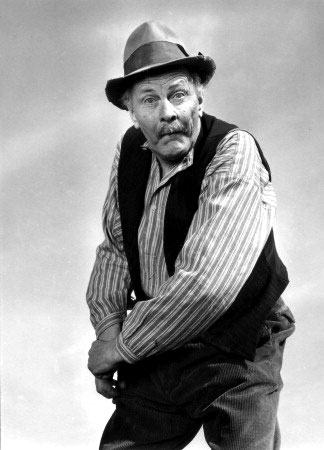
John Elfström as Åsa-Nisse in 1955.

The character has also been adapted into a popular series of burlesque comedy films.

- Åsa-Nisse (1949)
- Åsa-Nisse Goes Hunting (1950)
- Åsa-Nisse på nya äventyr (1952)
- Åsa-Nisse on Holiday (1953)
- Åsa-Nisse på hal is (1954)
- Åsa-Nisse ordnar allt (1955)
- Åsa-Nisse flyger i luften (1956)
- Åsa-Nisse i full fart (1957)
- Åsa-Nisse in Military Uniform (1958)
- Åsa-Nisse jubilerar (1959)
- Åsa-Nisse as a Policeman (1960)
- Åsa-Nisse bland grevar och baroner (1961)
- Åsa-Nisse på Mallorca (1962)
- Åsa-Nisse och tjocka släkten (1963)
- Åsa-Nisse i popform (1964)
- Åsa-Nisse slår till (1965)
- Åsa-Nisse i raketform (1966)
- Åsa-Nisse i agentform (1967)
- Sarons ros och gubbarna i Knohult (1968)
- Åsa-Nisse och den stora kalabaliken (1968)
- Åsa-Nisse i rekordform (1969)

John Elfström portrayed Åsa-Nisse in 19 of the 20 films and Arthur Rolén played the side-kick Klabbarparn (Ågren) in 18. Brita Öberg played Åsa-Nisse's wife Eulalia and Mona Geijer-Falkner played Klabbarparn's wife Kristin. Fourteen of the films were directed by Ragnar Frisk. In ten of the films, Bertil Boo made an appearance as "the singing farmer".

Kjell Bergqvist plays Åsa-Nisse in the 2011 reboot film Åsa-Nisse – wälkom to Knohult. This is the first Åsa-Nisse film since 1969.

=== Musical ===
The novels have also been adapted into a stage musical.

== Reputation ==
While the 19 film sequels are a testament to Åsa-Nisse's popularity the movies have always been panned by critics both then and now. Some even see it as a low point in Swedish cinema that works as a stark contrast to Ingmar Bergman's work of the same period. Their style of humour is now out of fashion but re-runs are still frequent on TV and they have been released on VHS and DVD.

== See also ==
- 91:an (comic book)
