= Bertil Boo =

Swedish singer

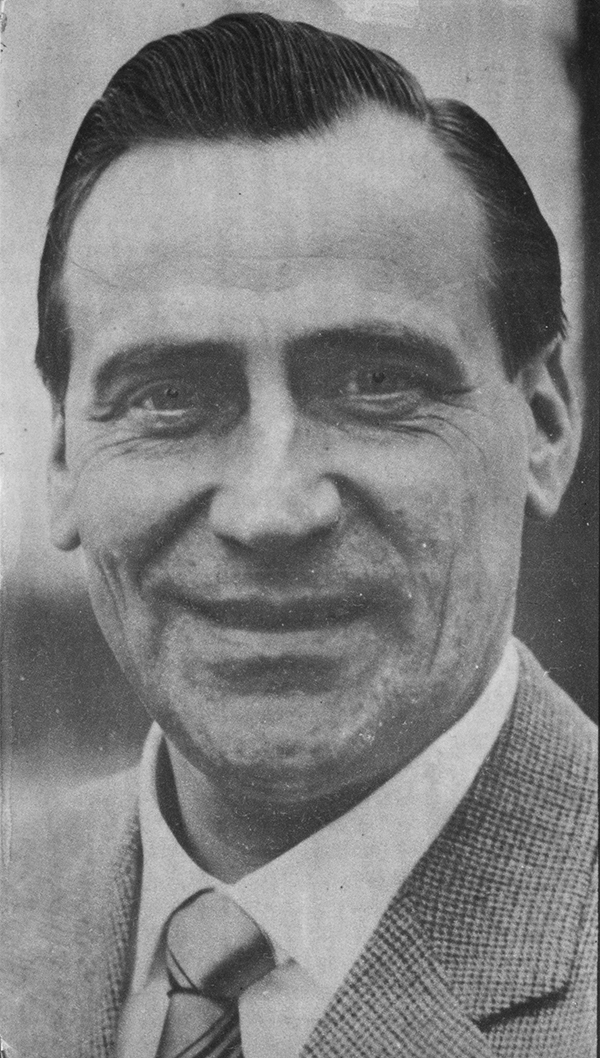
- Photo on record sleeve 1959

Background information
- Born: John Bertil Boo; 16 January 1914; Askersund, Sweden
- Died: 20 July 1996 (aged 82) Sundbyberg, Sweden
- Genres: Ballads
- Occupations: Singer, actor, farmer
- Label: Sonora

John Bertil Boo (16 January 1914 in Askersund – 20 July 1996 in Sundbyberg) was a Swedish singer.

Bertil Boo grew up as the youngest of 15 siblings on a farm, which he took over after the death of his father. It was not until 1946, at the age of 32, that Boo became popular as a singer, when he sang the sentimental song Violer till mor (Violets for Mother) in the Swedish radio show Frukostklubben. Boo had already recorded the song on the Sonora label, which at the time was one of the leading Swedish record labels, and after the performance on Frukostklubben, Violer till mor sold 250,000 copies, which in 1946 was an extraordinarily high number. Boo became known for singing this kind of popular ballad, and made a large number of recordings. His sobriquet was Den sjungande bonden (the singing farmer).

As the "singing farmer", Boo appeared in ten of the Åsa-Nisse films between 1949 and 1966. Boo did not consider himself an actor, but would sing one or more songs in the films.

Bertil Boo died of leukemia in 1996.
