= House Slaves =

House Slaves may refer to:

- House slaves, slaves who worked, and often lived, in the house of the slave-owner
- House Slaves (1923 film), a Swedish silent comedy film
- House Slaves (1933 film), a Swedish silent comedy film
