= The Count of the Old Town =

1935 film

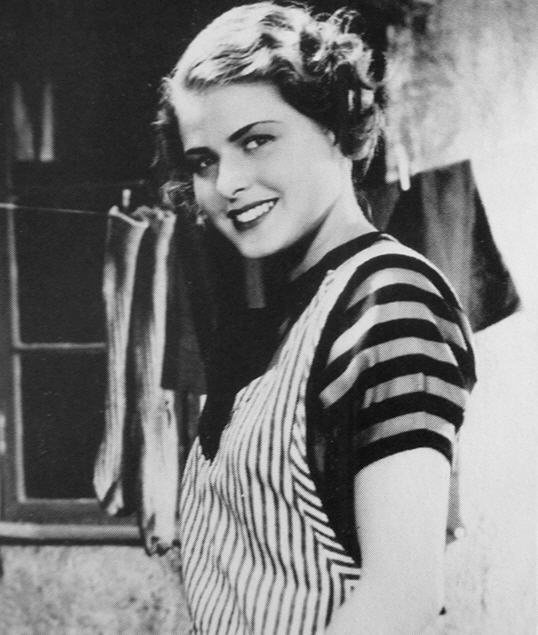
- Ingrid Bergman in Munkbrogreven
- Swedish: Munkbrogreven
- Directed by: Edvin Adolphson; Sigurd Wallén
- Written by: Gösta Stevens
- Screenplay by: Arthur Natorp; Siegfried Fischer
- Based on: Greven av Gamla Stan by: Siegfried Fischer; Arthur Fischer
- Starring: Valdemar Dalquist; Julia Cæsar; Sigurd Wallén; Tollie Zellman; Edvin Adolphson; Ingrid Bergman; Eric Abrahamsson; Weyler Hildebrand
- Cinematography: Åke Dahlqvist
- Edited by: Rolf Husberg
- Music by: Jules Sylvain
- Production company: AB Fribergs Filmbyrå
- Release date: 21 January 1935 (Sweden)
- Running time: 83 min
- Country: Sweden
- Language: Swedish

The Count of the Old Town (Swedish: Munkbrogreven) is a 1935 Swedish comedy film directed by Edvin Adolphson and Sigurd Wallén, both of whom also had major acting roles in the film. It was Ingrid Bergman's first speaking role in a film.

== Cast ==
- Valdemar Dalquist as Greven (as Waldemar Dalquist)
- Julia Cæsar as Klara (as Julia Caesar)
- Sigurd Wallén as Gurkan
- Tollie Zellman as Amalia
- Edvin Adolphson as Åke
- Ingrid Bergman as Elsa
- Eric Abrahamsson as Borstis (as Eric Abrahamson)
- Weyler Hildebrand as Göransson
