= Maritta Marke =

Swedish actress

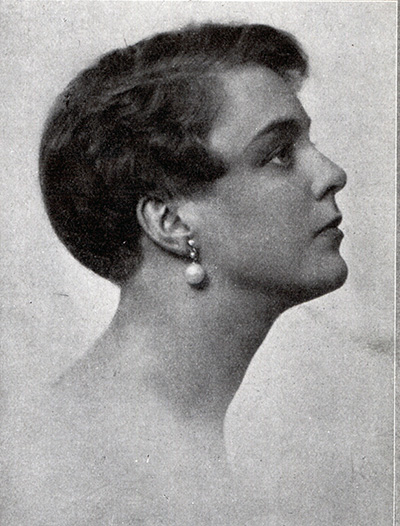
- Marke in 1927.
- Born: Asta Margit Svensson; 30 June 1905; Äsperöd, Sweden
- Died: 8 December 1983 (aged 78); Stockholm, Sweden
- Occupation: Actress
- Years active: 1931-1975 (film & TV)

Maritta Marke (born Asta Margit Svensson; 30 June 1905 – 8 December 1983) was a Swedish film and stage actress. She also sang in operettas. She was married to the actor Leif Amble-Næss in 1938 with whom she had a son Lars Amble. She had previously been married to the conductor Håkan von Eichwald.

== Selected filmography ==
- Tired Theodore (1931)
- A Night of Love by the Öresund (1931)
- Lucky Devils (1932)
- A Stolen Waltz (1932)
- Mother-in-Law's Coming (1932)
- Marriageable Daughters (1933)
- Two Men and a Widow (1933)
- The Marriage Game (1935)
- He, She and the Money (1936)
- Kungen kommer (1936)
- Unfriendly Relations (1936)
- Hotel Paradise (1937)
- Nothing But the Truth (1939)
- June Night (1940)
- Widower Jarl (1945)
- Classmates (1952)
- Rasmus and the Vagabond (1955)
- When the Mills are Running (1956)
- Lend Me Your Wife (1959)
- When Darkness Falls (1960)
- Heart's Desire (1960)
- Woman of Darkness (1966)

== Bibliography ==
- Quirk, Lawrence J. Ingrid Bergman. Gremese Editore, 1983.
