= Charlotte Löwensköld (1930 film) =

1930 film

- Directed by: Gustaf Molander
- Written by: Selma Lagerlöf (novel); Ragnar Hyltén-Cavallius
- Starring: Pauline Brunius; Gertrud Pålson-Wettergren; Birgit Sergelius; Axel Nilsson
- Cinematography: Julius Jaenzon
- Edited by: Rolf Husberg
- Music by: Jules Sylvain
- Production companies: Svensk Filmindustri; Film AB Minerva
- Release date: 1930
- Running time: 85 minutes
- Country: Sweden
- Language: Swedish

Charlotte Löwensköld is a 1930 Swedish drama film directed by Gustaf Molander and starring Pauline Brunius, Gertrud Pålson-Wettergren and Birgit Sergelius. It is an adaptation of the 1925 novel Charlotte Löwensköld by Selma Lagerlöf. The film was not considered a success, and no further adaptations of Lagerlöf's work were made in her lifetime. The story was the basis for the 1979 film of the same title.

== Cast ==
- Pauline Brunius as Beate Ekenstedt
- Gertrud Pålson-Wettergren as Anna Svärd
- Birgit Sergelius as Charlotte Löwensköld
- Axel Nilsson as Forsius, vicar
- Stina Berg as Mrs. Forsius
- Eric Barclay as Karl-Artur Ekenstedt
- Urho Somersalmi as Schagerström
- Kolbjörn Knudsen as Pontus Friman
- Edith Wallén as Thea Sundler
- Alfred Lundberg as Bishop

== Bibliography ==
- Larsson, Mariah & Marklund, Anders (ed.). Swedish Film: An Introduction and Reader. Nordic Academic Press, 2010.
