= Tired Theodore (1931 film) =

1931 film

- Directed by: Gustaf Edgren
- Written by: Sölve Cederstrand
- Based on: Der müde Theodor by Max Ferner and Max Neal
- Produced by: Sven Nygren
- Starring: Valdemar Dalquist; Karin Swanström; Brita Appelgren
- Cinematography: Åke Dahlqvist
- Music by: Jules Sylvain
- Production companies: Film AB Minerva; Les Établissements Jacques Haïk
- Distributed by: Svensk Filmindustri
- Release date: 31 August 1931
- Running time: 75 minutes
- Countries: France; Sweden
- Language: Swedish

Tired Theodore (Swedish: Trötte Teodor) is a 1931 French-Swedish comedy film directed by Gustaf Edgren and starring Valdemar Dalquist, Karin Swanström and Brita Appelgren. It is based on the 1913 German play Der müde Theodor by Max Ferner and Max Neal, which has been adapted for the screen several times.

== Production and release ==
The film was shot at the Råsunda Studios in Stockholm, with cinematography by Åke Dahlqvist. Its sets were designed by the art director Arne Åkermark. It premiered on 31 August 1931 at the Palladium cinema in Stockholm.

A separate French-language version, Night Shift (Service de nuit), directed by Henri Fescourt, was produced as part of the same project and released in 1932. Europafilm subsequently produced another Swedish adaptation of the play, Tired Theodore (1945), directed by Anders Henrikson. The play was also filmed in Germany in 1918, 1936 and 1957.

== Cast ==
- Valdemar Dalquist as Teodor Hörneman, a man of independent means
- Karin Swanström as Rosa Hörneman, his wealthy wife
- Håkan Westergren as Bertil Hörneman, Teodor's foster son
- Brita Appelgren as Britta Kronfeldt, a ballet dancer and singer
- Fritiof Billquist as Ivar Camillus, a schoolteacher
- Maritta Marke as Laura Camillus, his wife
- Rune Carlsten as Isaac Moseson, a pawnbroker
- Gucken Cederborg as Sarah Moseson, his wife
- Anna-Lisa Baude as Frida, the Hörnemans' maid
- Ragnar Widestedt as a criminal
- Bengt-Olof Granberg as a criminal
- Artur Cederborgh as the porter at Hotel Babylon
- Sune Holmqvist as Kalle, a bellboy
- Bertil Brusewitz as the police inspector
- Harry Ahlin as the police inspector's assistant
- Carl Deurell as the head of the Royal Welfare Department's committee for the promotion of music
- Algot Gunnarsson as a theatre manager
- Richard Lindström as a theatre director
- Gösta Gustafson as Andersson, a janitor at the Royal Welfare Department
- Knut Lambert as Carl Mild, chairman of the Good Samaritans association
- Sven Jerring as the announcer
- Yngve Nyqvist as the restaurateur
- Eric Abrahamsson as a restaurant guest
- Paul Hagman as a restaurant attendant
- Julia Cæsar as an office clerk at the Royal Welfare Department
- Frithiof Hedvall as Anderberg, Teodor's friend
- Arvid Petersén as an Italian tenor
- Sven Maister as a journalist from Morgonposten
- Sigge Fürst as a silhouetted figure in the restaurant doorway
- Hugo Jacobson as an official of the Good Samaritans association
- Disa Gillis as a woman assigned a hotel room by the porter
- Erik Forslund as a waiter
- Tage Almqvist as a restaurant guest who kisses Britta's hand
- Georg Fernquist as a restaurant guest who kisses Britta's hand
- Folke Helleberg as a restaurant guest
- Gustaf Edgren as a restaurant guest

== Television broadcasts and controversy ==
Film historian Per Olov Qvist discusses the portrayal of the pawnbroker Isaac Moseson as an early example of antisemitism in Swedish cinema of the 1930s. The film's later television broadcasts in Sweden and Norway prompted complaints and press criticism over its depiction of Jewish characters.

=== Sweden ===
Following a Swedish television broadcast on 8 December 1985, a complaint concerning the film's antisemitism was submitted to the Swedish broadcasting review board, Radionämnden. In a response dated 10 April 1986, TV's Oloph Hansson defended the broadcast on the grounds that older films reflected the values of their period. The broadcaster acknowledged that the Moseson couple would be unacceptable in a contemporary Swedish feature film, but argued that excluding older works because of their characters' attitudes or portrayals would be unreasonable. It did not consider explanatory or corrective commentary appropriate.

On 24 April 1986, the board ruled by a narrow majority that the broadcast had breached the democratic principles provision in Section 6 of the Swedish Broadcasting Act (Sw. radiolagen (1966:755)). Although it accepted that older cultural works inevitably reflected the attitudes of their time, it found that one of the film's principal themes expressed 1930s prejudice against Jews and that the portrayal of the Moseson couple relied unmistakably on antisemitic stereotypes. Three dissenting members agreed that the film was antisemitic but considered it a farce that also exploited other prejudices for comic effect, and judged it unlikely to encourage contemporary antisemitism.

=== Norway ===
The film was broadcast on Norwegian television on 13 December 1986, three days after Elie Wiesel received the Nobel Peace Prize. The broadcast drew strong criticism in the Norwegian press. Representatives of NRK stated that the film had been acquired as part of a larger package of older Swedish films and had not been previewed, describing the broadcast as a mistake. The Norwegian controversy was also noted in the Swedish newspaper Aftonbladet on 17 December 1986.

== Music ==
The film includes the following musical works:

- "Jag är blott en stackars kvinna", composed by Jules Sylvain, with lyrics by Eric Roos, Karl-Ewert and S. S. Wilson; performed instrumentally.
- "Fjorton år tror jag visst att jag var", with lyrics by Henrik Lilljebjörn; performed instrumentally.
- "Hab' ich nur deine Liebe" from Boccaccio, composed by Franz von Suppé, with German lyrics by Friedrich Zell and Richard Genée and Swedish lyrics (1879) by Carl Gustaf Wilhelm Michal; sung by Helga Görlin, dubbing Brita Appelgren.
- "Köp hjärtan (En liten amulett)", composed by Jules Sylvain, with lyrics by S. S. Wilson; sung by Helga Görlin, dubbing Brita Appelgren, and also whistled by Sune Holmqvist.
- "Wenn du meine Tante siehst" ("Jag vill ha en tös med långa flätor"), composed by Rud Nelson, with German lyrics by Rudolf Schanzer and Ernst Welisch and Swedish lyrics (1925) by Karl Gerhard; performed instrumentally.
- The overture to Orphée aux enfers, composed by Jacques Offenbach; performed instrumentally.
- "En juvel i Mälardrottningens krona", composed by Helge Lindberg, with lyrics by Karl-Ewert; performed instrumentally.
- "Who Were You With Last Night" ("Var har du vatt i natt?"), with music and English lyrics by Mark Sheridan and Fred Godfrey and Swedish lyrics by Ernst Rolf; performed instrumentally.

== Bibliography ==
- Qvist, Per Olov (1995). Folkhemmets bilder: Modernisering, motstånd och mentalitet i den svenska 30-talsfilmen. Lund: Arkiv. ISBN 9179240844. (in Swedish)
- Qvist, Per Olov & von Bagh, Peter (2000). Guide to the Cinema of Sweden and Finland. Greenwood Publishing Group.
- Schildt, Jurgen (1970). Det pensionerade paradiset: Anteckningar om svensk 30-talsfilm. Stockholm: PAN Norstedts. pp. 32–34. (in Swedish)
