= Ahlsell =

Ahlsell may refer to:

- Ahlsell Trophy, Golf tournament held in Sweden
- Herman Ahlsell (1919–1994), Swedish director and actor
