= Berit Frodi =

Swedish actress (1926–2025)

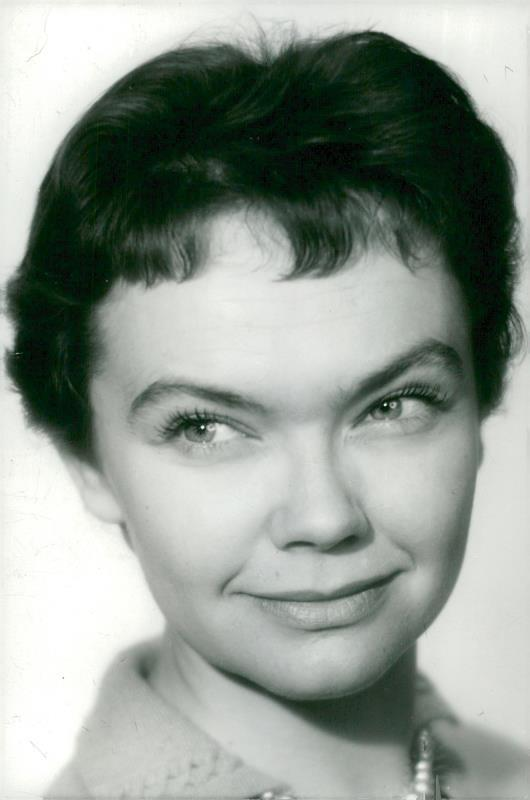
- Frodi in 1960
- Born: Berit Marianne Frodi; 19 April 1926; Gothenburg, Sweden
- Died: 17 July 2025 (aged 99); Halland County, Sweden
- Education: Gothenburg City Theatre
- Occupation: Actress
- Years active: 1947–1991
- Spouse: Gunnar Staern (m. 1960; div. 1971)
- Relatives: Ittla Frodi (sister)

Berit Marianne Frodi (19 April 1926 – 17 July 2025) was a Swedish actress, singer and director.

== Life and career ==
Frodi was born in Gothenburg on 19 April 1926. She was the daughter of Roland Frodi (died 1975), a shipowner and Vanja Dymling (died 1987). Her youngest sisters, Barbro Frodi (died 2017), was a television producer and Ittla Frodi (died 2003) was an actress.

She began her stage career as a student soloist in Storan's choir in Gothenburg in 1947 and entered the pupil school at Gothenburg City Theater in 1950. One of the most remarkable roles in cinema was Lena Hagen in drama-detective film Girl without a name (1954). Frodi's career as an actress and singer ended when she married the conductor Gunnar Staern. The two first met at Gävle city theater in September 1957 and married on 3 February 1960. Eventually, she set out a new career path as, among other things, a director. During the 1980s, she worked primarily as a theater teacher at the student schools in Gothenburg and as an instructor around the country. She retired in 1991.

Frodi died at a nursing home on 17 July 2025, at the age of 99.

== Filmography ==
- 1954 – Foreign Intrigue (TV Movie)
- 1954 – Girl Without a Name
- 1958 – The Koster Waltz
- 1959 – Beautiful Susanna and the old men
- 1969 – Let's make an opera (TV opera)
