= The Bride Came Through the Ceiling =

1947 film

- Directed by: Bengt Palm
- Written by: Torsten Quensel
- Starring: Annalisa Ericson; Stig Järrel; Karl-Arne Holmsten
- Cinematography: Karl-Erik Alberts
- Edited by: Eric Nordemar
- Music by: Sven Rüno
- Production company: Centrumfilm
- Distributed by: Wivefilm
- Release date: 24 March 1947
- Running time: 72 minutes
- Country: Sweden
- Language: Swedish

The Bride Came Through the Ceiling (Swedish: Bruden kom genom taket) is a 1947 Swedish comedy film directed by Bengt Palm and starring Annalisa Ericson, Stig Järrel and Karl-Arne Holmsten. It was shot at the Centrumateljéerna Studios in Stockholm and on location in the city including at the Central Station. The film's sets were designed by the art director Bertil Duroj. It incorporated footage of Ericson on stage from the 1940 comedy Kiss Her!.

== Synopsis ==
After a series of burglaries in Stockholm, a mysterious and attractive young woman crashes through a glass ceiling into an apartment of a middle-class family below.

== Cast ==
- Annalisa Ericson as Marianne Linnér
- Stig Järrel as Sigvard Lejoncrona
- Karl-Arne Holmsten as Ragnar Lejoncrona
- Gunnar Björnstrand as Sune Eriksson
- Elsa Carlsson as Augustine Lejoncrona
- Douglas Håge as Konstapel Karlsson
- Hjördis Petterson as Fru Linnér
- Nils Ekstam as Putte Linnér, kriminalkommissarie
- Carl Hagman as Polis på polisstationen
- Margit Andelius as Karin Andersson
- Wiktor Andersson as Korvgubbe
- Saga Sjöberg as Anna-Greta Linnér
- Gunnar Johansson as Orkesterledare
- Birger Åsander as Poliskonstapel

== Bibliography ==
- Qvist, Per Olov & von Bagh, Peter. Guide to the Cinema of Sweden and Finland. Greenwood Publishing Group, 2000.
