= He, She and the Money =

1936 film

- Håkan Westergren and Kirsten Heiberg
- Directed by: Anders Henrikson
- Written by: Weyler Hildebrand; Torsten Lundqvist
- Starring: Håkan Westergren; Kirsten Heiberg; Erik 'Bullen' Berglund
- Cinematography: Elner Åkesson
- Edited by: Rolf Husberg
- Music by: Jules Sylvain
- Production company: Svensk Filmindustri
- Release date: 19 October 1936
- Running time: 82 minutes
- Country: Sweden
- Language: Swedish

He, She and the Money (Swedish: Han, hon och pengarna) is a 1936 Swedish comedy film directed by Anders Henrikson and starring Håkan Westergren, Kirsten Heiberg and Erik 'Bullen' Berglund. It marked the Swedish film debut of the Norwegian actress Heiberg.

The film's sets were designed by the art director Arne Åkermark.

== Synopsis ==
Göran Hilding is a reckless gambler. He is down to his last valuable possession, 50 shares in a publishing company, that he will have to pledge. He shortly learns that he has inherited a million and the publishing company after the death of an uncle.

== Main cast ==
- Håkan Westergren as Göran Hilding
- Kirsten Heiberg as Margarita Perkins
- Erik 'Bullen' Berglund as Editor P. Andersson
- Maritta Marke as Maria Barke
- Eric Abrahamsson as Brovall
- Ruth Stevens as Karin Grandin
- John Precht as Herman Stål
- Nils Ericsson as Nisse Karlsson
- Carl Browallius as District Judge Widmark
- Thor Modéen as Wholesaler Lindberg
- Julia Cæsar as Miss Pallander
- Gösta Gustafson as Alstermo
- George Fant as Party guest
- Sven-Eric Gamble as Bell boy

== Bibliography ==
- Per Olov Qvist & Peter von Bagh, Guide to the Cinema of Sweden and Finland. Greenwood Publishing Group, 2000.
