= Heart's Desire (1960 film) =

1960 film

- Directed by: Rolf Husberg
- Written by: Karl Ragnar Gierow (play); Stig Ahlgren
- Produced by: Sigurd Jørgensen
- Starring: Jarl Kulle; Margita Ahlin; Edvin Adolphson
- Cinematography: Jan Lindeström
- Edited by: Wic Kjellin
- Music by: Harry Arnold
- Production company: Europa Film
- Distributed by: Europa Film
- Release date: 29 August 1960
- Running time: 99 minutes
- Country: Sweden
- Language: Swedish

Heart's Desire (Swedish: Av hjärtans lust) is a 1960 Swedish comedy film directed by Rolf Husberg and starring Jarl Kulle, Margita Ahlin and Edvin Adolphson. It was shot at the Sundbyberg Studios of Europa Film in Stockholm. The film's sets were designed by the art director Arne Åkermark.

== Cast ==
- Jarl Kulle as Baron Patrik Sinclair
- Margita Ahlin as Harriet Humbert
- Edvin Adolphson as Anton Humbert
- Gösta Cederlund as Lindgren
- Hans Lindgren as Stefan Forell
- Renée Björling as Aurore, Patrik's Mother
- Signe Enwall as Aunt Ulla
- Birgitta Valberg as Henriette Löwenflycht
- Ulla-Bella Fridh as Maja, maid
- Torsten Lilliecrona as Hans Mortimer
- Åke Fridell as Sjöberg
- Wiktor Andersson as Gardener
- Björn Bjelfvenstam as Forell's colleague
- Allan Edwall as Servant
- Arthur Fischer as Old farmar
- Åke Harnesk as Hen keeper
- Birger Lensander as Manager
- Curt Löwgren as Mechanic
- Maritta Marke as Tourist
- Marianne Nielsen as Tourist
- Bellan Roos as Cook
- Chris Wahlström as Peasant woman

== Bibliography ==
- Qvist, Per Olov & von Bagh, Peter. Guide to the Cinema of Sweden and Finland. Greenwood Publishing Group, 2000.
