= Anders Nyström (actor) =

Swedish actor (1933–2022)

Anders Nyström (8 February 1933 – 17 December 2022) was a Swedish actor.

== Selected filmography ==
- 1942: Himlaspelet – Shepherd (uncredited)
- 1942: Kan doktorn komma? – Boy with Tooth Ache (uncredited)
- 1943: Katrina – Herman, Saga's and Einar's son (uncredited)
- 1943: När ungdomen vaknar – Hanseman
- 1943: The Brothers' Woman – Lill-Nicklas (uncredited)
- 1943: Gentleman with a Briefcase – Gunnar, Berger's Son
- 1944: En dotter född – Hanseman, Gunnar and Britta's Son (uncredited)
- 1944: Torment – Bror Widgren (uncredited)
- 1944: … och alla dessa kvinnor – Axel
- 1944: Vändkorset – Olle Odelman
- 1944: The Emperor of Portugallia – August aged 12 (uncredited)
- 1945: Maria of Kvarngarden – Nils
- 1945: I som här inträden – Jan
- 1945: Barnen från Frostmofjället – Monke
- 1946: 100 dragspel och en flicka – Pelle Norell
- 1946: Ödemarksprästen – Carl Rutger von Wessing
- 1947: Pappa sökes – Kurt Hallman
- 1947: Maria – Bell Boy (uncredited)
- 1947: Det kom en gäst – Ulf, Mariannes bror (uncredited)
- 1952: Defiance – School boy (uncredited)
- 1971: Badjävlar (TV movie) – Gunnar Nilsson
- 1972: Spöksonaten (TV movie) – Den förnäme
- 1972: Den längsta dagen – Gunnar
- 1975: Pojken med guldbyxorna (TV mini-series) – Tocken
- 1978–1982: Hedebyborna (TV series) – Sixten Svensson
- 1980: Det frusna Atlantis
- 1981: Höjdhoppar'n – High-Jumper
- 1981: Göta kanal eller Vem drog ur proppen? – Tage
- 1982: Zoombie (TV mini-series) – Holger Jakobsson
- 1983: Lykkeland (TV mini-series) – Scenarbetaren
- 1986: Flykten (TV mini-series)
- 1987–1988: Goda grannar (TV series) – Helge Runåker
- 1993: Snoken (TV series) – Fiskaren
- 1995–1998: Svenska hjärtan (TV series) – Nils
- 1996: Jerusalem – Sven Persson
- 1997–1998: Skärgårdsdoktorn (TV series) – Kapten Sandberg
- 1999: Anna Holt – polis
- 2000: Nya tider (TV series) – Ordf Harald Nilsson
- 2001: Pusselbitar (TV mini-series) – Tage
- 2002: Beck (TV series) – George Waltberg
- 2005-2007: Saltön (TV series) – Dr. Schenker
- 2013: Tyskungen – Erik Frankel
