= Life at Forsbyholm Manor =

1948 film

- Directed by: Elof Ahrle; Arne Mattsson
- Written by: Arne Mehrens
- Starring: Sickan Carlsson; Egon Larsson; Nils Ericsson
- Cinematography: Julius Jaenzon
- Edited by: Tage Holmberg
- Music by: Miff Görling; Nathan Görling; Arthur Österwall
- Production company: Kungsfilm
- Distributed by: Kungsfilm
- Release date: 19 January 1948
- Running time: 86 minutes
- Country: Sweden
- Language: Swedish

Life at Forsbyholm Manor (Swedish: Livet på Forsbyholm) is a 1948 Swedish comedy film directed by Elof Ahrle and Arne Mattsson and starring Sickan Carlsson, Egon Larsson and Nils Ericsson. It was shot at the Råsunda Studios in Stockholm and on location in Värmdö and Sigtuna. The film's sets were designed by the art director Nils Svenwall.

== Synopsis ==
At a Swedish boarding school the head embarks on a liberal new regime, but in order to get the government funding he needs he first has to prove himself by handling a problem student. On top of this a new female teacher arrives.

== Cast ==
- Sickan Carlsson as Britt Lange
- Egon Larsson as Rutger von Hake
- Nils Ericsson as Gösta Bergmark
- Douglas Håge as Wiik
- John Botvid as Spira
- Thor Modéen as August von Hake
- Marianne Löfgren as Agneta von Hake
- Mona Geijer-Falkner as Cleaning-lady
- Artur Rolén as Kärrson

== Bibliography ==
- Krawc, Alfred. International Directory of Cinematographers, Set- and Costume Designers in Film: Denmark, Finland, Norway, Sweden (from the beginnings to 1984). Saur, 1986.
- Qvist, Per Olov & von Bagh, Peter. Guide to the Cinema of Sweden and Finland. Greenwood Publishing Group, 2000.
