= Birgit Sergelius =

Finnish-Swedish actress

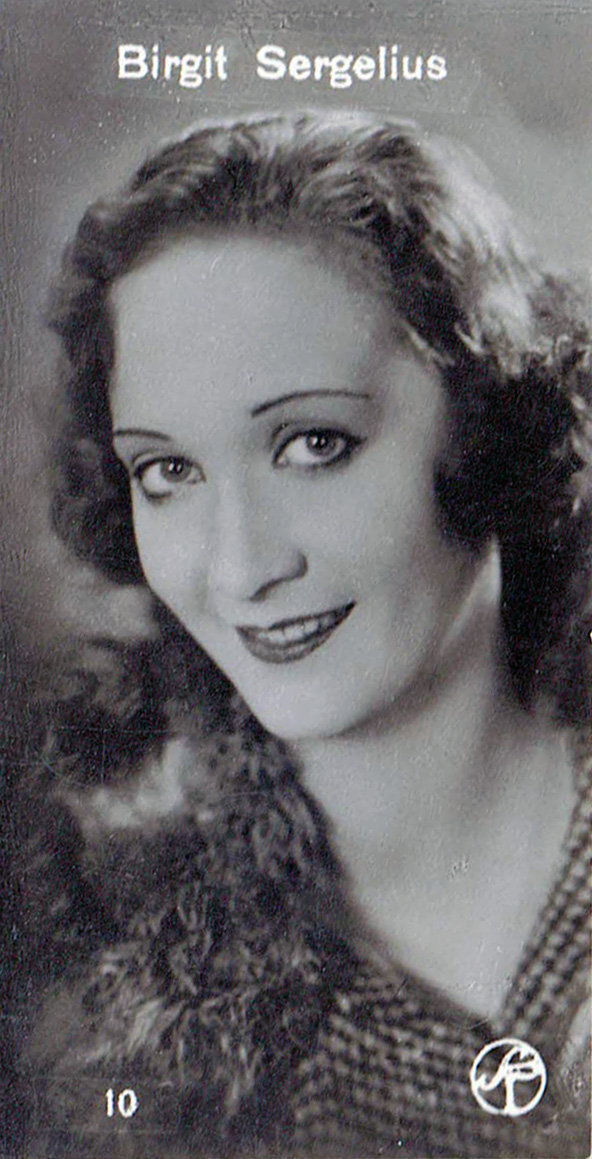
- Born: 13 March 1907; Helsinki, Finland
- Died: 29 January 1979 (aged 71); Stockholm, Sweden
- Occupation: Actress
- Years active: 1926–1943 (film)

Birgit Sergelius (March 13, 1907 – January 29, 1979) was a Finnish-born stage and film actress who later settled and worked in Sweden. She was married to the actor Georg Rydeberg and to artist Erik Öhlin.

== Selected filmography ==
- Charlotte Löwensköld (1930)
- Två hjärtan och en skuta (1932)
- Pettersson & Bendel (1933)
- Love and Dynamite (1933)
- Lyckan kommer (1942)
- Mister Collins' Adventure (1943)

== Bibliography ==
- McIlroy, Brian. World Cinema: Sweden. Flicks Books, 1986.
