= Evening at the Djurgarden =

1946 film

- Directed by: Rolf Husberg
- Written by: Gösta Rodin; Gardar Sahlberg
- Produced by: Lars-Owe Carlberg
- Starring: Adolf Jahr; Emy Hagman; Nils Ericsson
- Cinematography: Julius Jaenzon
- Edited by: Oscar Rosander
- Music by: Remo Ciacelli; Thore Ehrling; Kai Gullmar
- Production company: Wivefilm
- Distributed by: Wivefilm
- Release date: 18 November 1946
- Running time: 99 minutes
- Country: Sweden
- Language: Swedish

Evening at the Djurgarden (Swedish: Djurgårdskvällar) is a 1946 Swedish comedy film directed by Rolf Husberg and starring Adolf Jahr, Emy Hagman and Nils Ericsson. It was shot at the Centrumateljéerna Studios in Stockholm. The film's sets were designed by the art director Nils Svenwall.

== Cast ==
- Adolf Jahr as Affe Grönlund
- Emy Hagman as Vera Valli
- Nils Ericsson as Felix Winter
- Lasse Krantz as Carl Maxon
- Douglas Håge as Johnny Maxon
- John Botvid as Algot Blomster
- Naima Wifstrand as Mrs. Bender
- Agneta Lagerfeldt as Elsie Nord
- Ingrid Björk as Inga Grönlund
- Henrik Schildt as Arne Grönlund
- Harrine Cederholm as Sonja
- Rune Stylander as Roffe
- Peter Lindgren as Nicke
- Wiktor Andersson as Barker at Gröna Lund
- Carl Andersson as Poker player
- Sven Bergvall as Judge
- Julie Bernby as Jonny's lady friend
- John W. Björling as Poker player
- Mats Björne as Police secretary
- Gillis Blom as Arne's defence lawyer
- Edvard Danielsson as District attorney
- Sven Ericsson as Man in the ghost tunnel
- Gustaf Färingborg as Police interrogating Arne
- Sigge Fürst as Man
- Tage Johansson as Barker
- Gösta Kjellertz as Bellman
- Uno Larsson as Older man at Gröna Lund
- Carin Lundquist as Miss Greta, waitress
- Cécile Ossbahr as Woman
- Gösta Qvist as Court visitor
- Ulla Sallert as Ulla Winbladh
- Monica Schildt as Miss Danje
- Mauritz Strömbom as Poker player
- Karin Windahl as Court visitor

== Bibliography ==
- Krawc, Alfred. International Directory of Cinematographers, Set- and Costume Designers in Film: Denmark, Finland, Norway, Sweden (from the beginnings to 1984). Saur, 1986.
