= En karl i köket =

- Directed by: Rolf Husberg
- Written by: Gösta Stevens based on the play Den mandlige Husassistent
- Starring: Herman Ahlsell; Ittla Frodi; Holger Löwenadler; Hjördis Petterson; Hugo Björne
- Release date: 1954
- Running time: 94 min
- Country: Sweden
- Language: Swedish

En karl i köket (English: A man in the kitchen) is a 1954 Swedish comedy film directed by Rolf Husberg. The film is based on the Danish play Den mandlige Husassistent by Fleming Lynge and Axel Frische. The play had its premiere at Det Ny Teater in Copenhagen 1937. The story was filmed in 1938 in Denmark as Den mandlige Husassistent and in Sweden as Herr Husassistenten. The film stars Herman Ahlsell, Ittla Frodi, Holger Löwenadler, and Hjördis Petterson.

== Cast ==
- Herman Ahlsell as Olle Larsson, head waiter
- Ittla Frodi as Karin Stenmark
- Holger Löwenadler as Attorney Arvid Stenmark, Karins father
- Hjördis Petterson as Bertha Stenmark, Karins mother
- Hugo Björne as Director Axel Möller, hotel owner
- Olle Johansson as Bertil Stenmark, Karins younger brother
- Kjell Nordenskiöld as Torsten Lindström, Karins fiancé
- Sive Norden as Eva Berglund, secretary of attorney Stenmark
- Märta Dorff as fröken Eriksson, cashier of attorney Stenmark
- Gull Natorp as member of the bridge club
- Inga Hodell as member of the bridge club
- Mary Rapp as guest at Karins party
- Sven-Axel "Akke" Carlsson as Bertils friend
- Sten Mattsson as Bertils friend
- Lennart Lundh as Buster, guest at Karins party
- Hanny Schedin as Mrs. Andersson, cleaning woman
- Aurore Palmgren as Miss Olsson
