= 65, 66 and I =

1936 film

- Directed by: Anders Henrikson
- Written by: Axel Frische (play); Weyler Hildebrand; Torsten Lundqvist; Fleming Lynge
- Produced by: Nils Whiten
- Starring: Thor Modéen; Carl Hagman; Katie Rolfsen
- Cinematography: Elner Åkesson
- Edited by: Rolf Husberg
- Music by: Jules Sylvain; Gösta Wallenius
- Production company: Wivefilm
- Distributed by: Wivefilm
- Release date: 23 November 1936
- Running time: 89 minutes
- Country: Sweden
- Language: Swedish

65, 66 and I (Swedish: 65, 66 och jag) is a 1936 Swedish comedy film directed by Anders Henrikson and starring Thor Modéen, Carl Hagman and Katie Rolfsen. It was shot at the Råsunda Studios in Stockholm. The film's sets were designed by the art director Arne Åkermark.

== Synopsis ==
A deserter from his military service steals the clothes of a wholesaler, unaware that he has just crashed into a lamppost in his car while drunk. In the confusion that follows the deserter gets sent to prison for thirty days while the wholesaler is taken away to complete his military duty.

== Cast ==
- Thor Modéen as Karl-Alfred Pettersson
- Carl Hagman as 65 Petrus Ramlösa
- Elof Ahrle as 66 Pelle Frisk
- Katie Rolfsen as Amalia Jönsson
- Allan Bohlin as Lt. Nils Tjäder
- Elsa Carlsson as Lisa Pettersson
- Artur Cederborgh as Fritiof Blomberg
- Greta Wenneberg as Ellen Pettersson
- Nils Jacobsson as Hallén
- Sigge Fürst as Police constable
- Hugo Jacobsson as Sgt. Andersson
- Karl Kinch as Doctor
- Olav Riégo as Police inspector
- Rolf Botvid as Waiter at Grand
- Birgit Chenon as Karl-Alfred's office clerk
- Erland Colliander as Policeman
- Hartwig Fock as Plainclothes policeman
- Åke Grönberg as Castle guard
- Wictor Hagman as Corporal
- Keith Hårleman as Bathing beauty
- Olle Jansson as Castle guard in tent
- Helge Karlsson as Prison guard
- Walter Lindström as Plainclothes policeman
- Hugo Lundström as Waiter at the outdoor restaurant
- Sven Magnusson as Castle guard
- Siri Olson as Bathing beauty
- Robert Ryberg as Maitre d' at Grand
- Åke Uppström as Castle guard at the hospital
- Eric von Gegerfelt as Guest at Grand
- Elna-Britta Wallman as Bathing beauty

== Bibliography ==
- Larsson, Mariah & Marklund, Anders. Swedish Film: An Introduction and Reader. Nordic Academic Press, 2010.
- Qvist, Per Olov & von Bagh, Peter. Guide to the Cinema of Sweden and Finland. Greenwood Publishing Group, 2000.
