= Poor Ferdinand =

1941 film

- Directed by: Nils Jerring
- Written by: Börje Larsson; Åke Söderblom
- Starring: Thor Modéen; Åke Söderblom; Tollie Zellman
- Cinematography: Martin Bodin
- Edited by: Oscar Rosander
- Music by: Gunnar Johansson; Jules Sylvain
- Production company: Fribergs Filmbyrå
- Distributed by: Fribergs Filmbyrå
- Release date: 26 December 1941
- Running time: 92 minutes
- Country: Sweden
- Language: Swedish

Poor Ferdinand (Swedish: Stackars Ferdinand) is a 1941 Swedish comedy film directed by Nils Jerring and starring Thor Modéen, Åke Söderblom and Tollie Zellman. Söderblom also co-wrote the script. It was shot at the Råsunda Studios in Stockholm. The film's sets were designed by the art director Arne Åkermark.

== Cast ==
- Thor Modéen as Ferdinand Dellander
- Åke Söderblom as Åke Palm
- Eric Abrahamsson as Herman Sjöberg
- Allan Bohlin as Gösta Dellander
- Tollie Zellman as Selma Dellander
- Gaby Stenberg as Florence Day
- Siv Ericks as Karin Dellander
- Karin Nordgren as Gunilla Dacke
- Hugo Björne as Dacke
- Georg Funkquist as Rutger Benckert
- Viran Rydkvist as Hulda
- Carl Hagman as Teofil Johansson
- Julia Cæsar as Mrs. Hagman
- Emy Hagman as Happy Woman
- Paul Hagman as Restaurant guest
- Torsten Winge as Wigmaker
- Torsten Hillberg as Director
- John Melin as Mr. Glad
- Gerd Mårtensson as Pretty girl
- Yngve Nyqvist as Guest
- John Elfström as Actor

== Bibliography ==
- Holmstrom, John. The Moving Picture Boy: An International Encyclopaedia from 1895 to 1995, Norwich, Michael Russell, 1996, p. 169.
