= Eric Abrahamsson =

Swedish actor

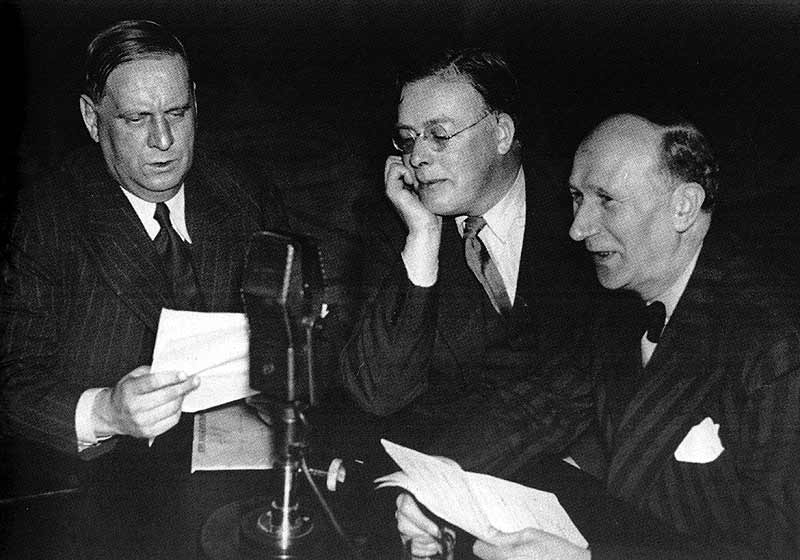
- Eric Abrahamsson (left), 1940
- Born: 13 April 1890; Stockholm, Sweden-Norway
- Died: 3 November 1942 (aged 52); Stockholm, Sweden
- Occupations: Actor; Comedian
- Years active: 1917–1942

Eric Abrahamsson (13 April 1890 – 3 November 1942) was a Swedish actor and comedian. He appeared in over fifty films between 1917 and 1942. He began his acting career with silent films and later acted in “talkies”. He often worked with fellow comedian Ludde Gentzel.

== Selected filmography ==
- A Man There Was (1917)
- Dante's Mysteries (1931)
- Tired Theodore (1931)
- The Red Day (1931)
- A Night of Love by the Öresund (1931)
- Black Roses (1932)
- A Stolen Waltz (1932)
- The Love Express (1932)
- Perhaps a Poet (1933)
- Dear Relatives (1933)
- Love and Dynamite (1933)
- House Slaves (1933)
- The Song to Her (1934)
- Eva Goes Aboard (1934)
- The People of Småland (1935)
- Munkbrogreven (1935)
- It Pays to Advertise (1936)
- He, She and the Money (1936)
- The Ghost of Bragehus (1936)
- Unfriendly Relations (1936)
- Witches' Night (1937)
- John Ericsson, Victor of Hampton Roads (1937)
- Happy Vestköping (1937)
- Thunder and Lightning (1938)
- Good Friends and Faithful Neighbours (1938)
- The Great Love (1938)
- Landstormens lilla Lotta (1939)
- Nothing But the Truth (1939)
- Kiss Her! (1940)
- One, But a Lion! (1940)
- With Open Arms (1940)
- The Crazy Family (1940)
- We're All Errand Boys (1941)
- Poor Ferdinand (1941)
- The Ghost Reporter (1941)
- Bright Prospects (1941)
- Goransson's Boy (1941)
- Tonight or Never (1941)
- Lärarinna på vift (1941)
- En trallande jänta (1942)
- It Is My Music (1942)
