= Carl Hagman =

Swedish actor

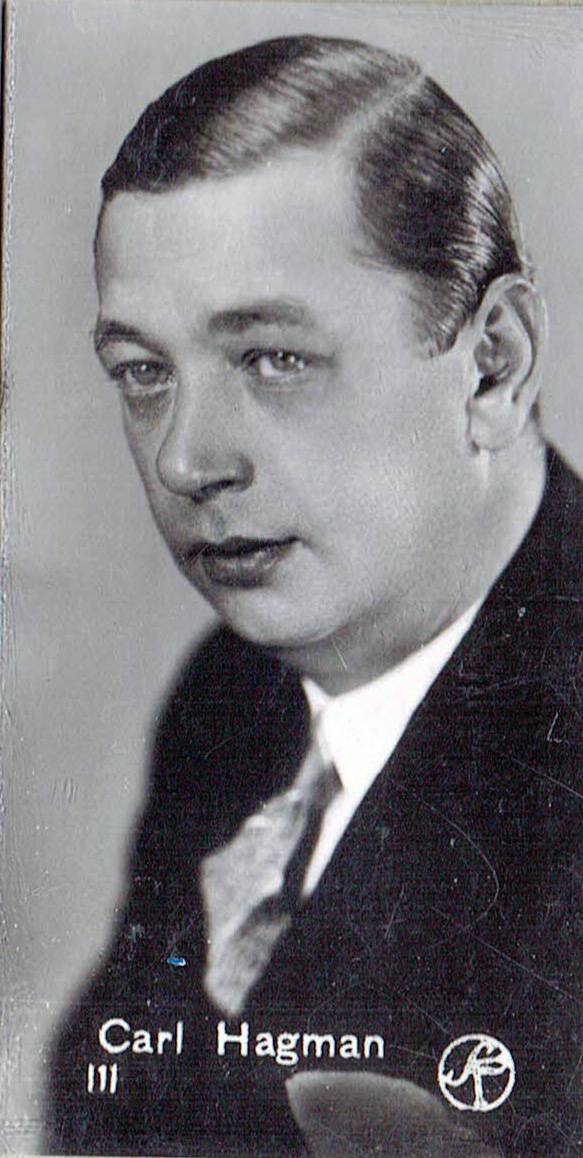
- Carl Hagman, 1930s
- Born: 12 October 1890; Stockholm, Sweden-Norway
- Died: 7 February 1949 (aged 58); Stockholm, Sweden
- Occupations: Actor, singer
- Years active: 1911-1949

Carl Hagman (12 October 1890 – 7 February 1949) was a stage and film Swedish actor and singer. He appeared in more than 40 films between 1911 and 1949. He was married to the actress Emy Hagman between 1927 and 1941.

== Selected filmography ==
- Boman at the Exhibition (1923)
- For Her Sake (1930)
- 65, 66 and I (1936)
- Hotel Paradise (1937)
- Just a Bugler (1938)
- We at Solglantan (1939)
- Swing it, magistern! (1940)
- The Train Leaves at Nine (1941)
- Poor Ferdinand (1941)
- Magistrarna på sommarlov (1941)
- Captured by a Voice (1943)
- She Thought It Was Him (1943)
- In Darkest Smaland (1943)
- Eaglets (1944)
- His Majesty Must Wait (1945)
- The Österman Brothers' Virago (1945)
- Incorrigible (1946)
- The Bride Came Through the Ceiling (1947)
- Neglected by His Wife (1947)
- No Way Back (1947)
- Robinson in Roslagen (1948)
- A Swedish Tiger (1948)
