= Eva Goes Aboard =

1934 Swedish comedy film

- Directed by: Lorens Marmstedt
- Written by: Eric Roos
- Produced by: Gösta Wykman
- Starring: Einar Axelsson; Astrid Marmstedt; Emy Hagman; Lili Ziedner
- Cinematography: Hilmer Ekdahl; Harry Hasso
- Music by: Jules Sylvain
- Production company: AB Real-Film
- Distributed by: AB Svea Film
- Release date: 3 November 1934
- Running time: 83 minutes
- Country: Sweden
- Language: Swedish

Eva Goes Aboard (Swedish: Eva går ombord) is a 1934 Swedish comedy film directed by Lorens Marmstedt and starring Einar Axelsson, Astrid Marmstedt and Emy Hagman. It was shot in Stockholm and Gothenburg with footage used from a variety of locations the ship calls at, including Egypt, Monaco, India and Kenya.

== Synopsis ==
When Eva Lindström, an employee in a fashion store, discovers cruise tickets in the name of Bo Stensjö in the back of a taxi, she whimsically boards the ship pretending to be his wife, and manages to pull off the deception with the help of her friend Ebba who works onboard. When the real Bo Stensjö comes aboard at Naples he plays along with this, and quickly falls in love with her. However, she is now wanted in Sweden as she went missing wearing expensive clothes and jewels that belonged to the store.

== Cast ==
- Einar Axelsson as Bo Stensjö
- Astrid Marmstedt as Eva Lindström
- Emy Hagman as Ebba
- Lili Ziedner as Mrs. Krook
- Åke Söderblom as Steward
- Birgitta Hede as Marianne
- Emma Meissner as Passenger
- Eric Abrahamsson as Boman
- Hjördis Petterson as Mrs. Johnson
- Olga Appellöf as Passenger
- Benkt-Åke Benktsson as Lundberg
- Bror Berger as Mannen med kofferten
- Karin Granberg as Passenger
- Harry Hasso as Slave trader in Mombasa
- Anna Olin as Fat lady on the train
- Ruth Weijden as Clerk
- Alf Östlund as Passenger

== Bibliography ==
- Qvist, Per Olov & von Bagh, Peter. Guide to the Cinema of Sweden and Finland. Greenwood Publishing Group, 2000.
