= Colourful Pages =

1931 film

- Directed by: Edvin Adolphson; Valdemar Dalquist
- Written by: Edvin Adolphson; Sölve Cederstrand; Valdemar Dalquist
- Produced by: Vilhelm Bryde
- Starring: Edvin Adolphson; Lili Ziedner; Gösta Ekman; Dagmar Ebbesen
- Cinematography: Åke Dahlqvist; Hugo Edlund; Julius Jaenzon
- Edited by: Rolf Husberg
- Music by: Jules Sylvain
- Production company: Film AB Minerva
- Distributed by: Svensk Filmindustri
- Release date: 1 January 1931
- Running time: 98 minutes
- Country: Sweden
- Language: Swedish

Colourful Pages (Swedish: Brokiga blad) is a 1931 Swedish musical comedy film directed by Edvin Adolphson, Valdemar Dalquist and starring Adolphson, Lili Ziedner, Gösta Ekman and Dagmar Ebbesen. It has described as the first Swedish revue film. It was shot at the Råsunda Studios in Stockholm and on location around the city. The film's sets were designed by the art directors Vilhelm Bryde and Arne Åkermark.

== Cast ==
- Edvin Adolphson as Movie director
- Lili Ziedner as The Queen
- Gösta Ekman as Sigge Wulff
- Vera Nilsson as Daughter
- Håkan Westergren as Neighbour's boy
- Dagmar Ebbesen as Mrs. Ebbesen
- Sigurd Wallén as Strandcharmören
- Nils Lundell as Father
- Concordia Selander as Grandmother
- Valdemar Dalquist as Valdemar Dalquist
- Arvid Petersén as Singer
- Olga Adamsén as Woman at cocktail party
- Albin Ahrenberg as Pilot
- Helge Andersson as Janitor at the exhibition
- Anna-Lisa Baude as Girl
- Eric Bengtson as Orchestra manager
- Stina Berg as Mother Stina
- Erik Bergvall as Bergvall
- Gösta Bodin as Opera singer
- Rulle Bohman as Rulle from Gothenburg
- Arne Borg as Self - the swimmer
- Ernst Brunman as Man falling into the water
- Vilhelm Bryde as Production manager
- Oscar Carlsson as Make-up artist
- Gucken Cederborg as Opera singer
- Gustaf Edgren as Edgren, director
- Carl Gustaf Ekman as Prime minister Ekman
- Annalisa Ericson as Dancer
- Emanuel Gille as Film crew
- Isaac Grünewald as Isaac, the painter
- Eric Gustafson as Guest at restaurant
- Gösta Gustafson as Manager at shopping department
- Weyler Hildebrand as Janitor at the exhibition
- Gösta Jonsson as Accordion player
- Helge Kihlberg as Guest at restaurant
- Thyra Leijman-Uppström as Woman at cocktail party
- Mats Lindberg as Lindberg
- Sigfrid Lindberg as Soccer player
- Richard Lindström as Scotsman
- Manne Lundh as Make-up artist
- Hugo Lundström as Man in sightseeing bus
- John Melin as Wholesalesman in the boat
- Gustaf Molander as Molander, director
- John Nilsson as Soccer player
- Katie Rolfsen as Bathing beauty
- Edla Rothgardt as Woman at cocktail party
- Victor Sjöström as Sjöström, director
- Greta Strömberg as Twin #1
- Maya Strömberg as Twin #2
- Palle Östling as Banjo player

== Bibliography ==
- Qvist, Per Olov & von Bagh, Peter. Guide to the Cinema of Sweden and Finland. Greenwood Publishing Group, 2000.
- Wallengren, Ann-Kristin. Welcome Home Mr Swanson: Swedish Emigrants and Swedishness on Film. Nordic Academic Press, 2014.
