= Gunnar Johansson (composer) =

Swedish composer (1906–1991)

- Born: 23 March 1906; Arvika, Sweden
- Died: 18 May 1991 (aged 85); Stockholm, Sweden
- Occupation: Composer
- Years active: 1932-1953 (film)

Gunnar Johansson (1906–1991) was a Swedish composer, conductor and professor. He composed many film scores for the Swedish film industry. He also taught at the Royal College of Music in Stockholm.

== Selected filmography ==
- Augusta's Little Misstep (1933)
- Good Friends and Faithful Neighbours (1938)
- Kiss Her! (1940)
- With Open Arms (1940)
- One, But a Lion! (1940)
- June Night (1940)
- Goransson's Boy (1940)
- The Crazy Family (1940)
- The Fight Continues (1941)
- Bright Prospects (1941)
- The Train Leaves at Nine (1941)
- Poor Ferdinand (1941)
- Dunungen (1941)
- We're All Errand Boys (1941)
- Tonight or Never (1941)
- It Is My Music (1942)
- Little Napoleon (1943)
- Katrina (1943)
- In Darkest Smaland (1943)
- My People Are Not Yours (1944)
- Prince Gustaf (1944)
- Count Only the Happy Moments (1944)
- Maria of Kvarngarden (1945)
- The Serious Game (1945)
- The Girls in Smaland (1945)
- Black Roses (1945)
- Life in the Finnish Woods (1947)
- Private Karlsson on Leave (1947)
- The Poetry of Ådalen (1947)
- The Bride Came Through the Ceiling (1947)
- The Night Watchman's Wife (1947)
- Sunshine (1948)

== Bibliography ==
- Rasmussen, Bjørn. Filmens hvem-vad-hvor: Udenlanske film 1950-1967. Politiken, 1968.
