= Ringarum =

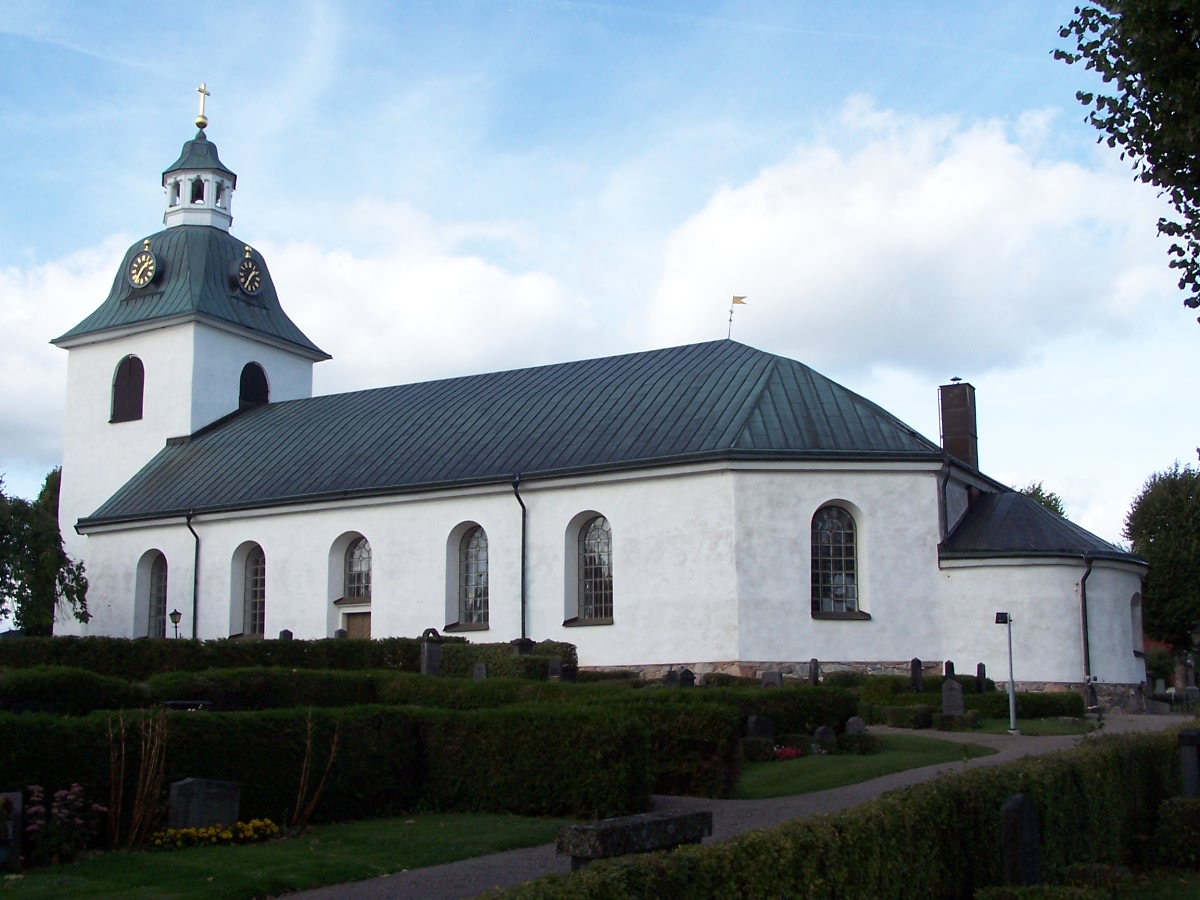
- Ringarum Church

- Location within Östergötland Location within Sweden
- Coordinates: 58°20′N 16°27′E
- Country: Sweden
- Province: Östergötland
- County: Östergötland County
- Municipality: Valdemarsvik Municipality

Area
  - Total: 0.92 km^{2} (0.36 sq mi)

Population (31 December 2020)
  - Total: 606
  - Density: 660/km^{2} (1,700/sq mi)
- Time zone: UTC+1 (CET)
  - Summer (DST): UTC+2 (CEST)

Ringarum is a locality situated in Valdemarsvik Municipality, Östergötland County, Sweden with 577 inhabitants in 2010.
