= One, But a Lion! =

- Directed by: Gustaf Molander
- Written by: Gösta Stevens; Gustaf Molander
- Starring: Håkan Westergren; Annalisa Ericson; Marianne Aminoff
- Cinematography: Julius Jaenzon
- Edited by: Oscar Rosander
- Music by: Gunnar Johansson
- Production company: Svensk Filmindustri
- Release date: 1 November 1940
- Running time: 94 minutes
- Country: Sweden
- Language: Swedish

One, But a Lion! (Swedish: En, men ett lejon!) is a 1940 Swedish comedy film directed by Gustaf Molander, who also co-wrote the screenplay, and starring Håkan Westergren, Annalisa Ericson and Marianne Aminoff.

The film's art direction was by Arne Åkermark.

== Cast ==
- Håkan Westergren as Kurt Lejon
- Annalisa Ericson as Camilla Storm
- Marianne Aminoff as Linda Lejon
- Fridtjof Mjøen as Harry Martin
- Tollie Zellman as Mrs. Grönberg
- Eric Abrahamsson as Mr. Eugene
- Mimi Pollak as Miss Blom
- Lill-Tollie Zellman as Miss Lisa
- Olga Adamsén as Customer
- Karin Alexandersson as Customer
- Margit Andelius as Cigar girl
- Gösta Bodin as Andersson
- Tor Borong as Travelling man
- Nils Dahlgren as Party guest
- Eivor Engelbrektsson as Shop assistant
- Britta Larsson as Party guest
- Marianne Lenard as Guest
- Walter Lindström as Policeman
- Gösta Lycke as Head Waiter
- Karin Nordgren as Guest
- Greta Wenneberg as Guest
- Lisa Wirström as Customer

== Bibliography ==
- Mariah Larsson & Anders Marklund. Swedish Film: An Introduction and Reader. Nordic Academic Press, 2010.
