= The Koster Waltz =

1958 film

- Directed by: Rolf Husberg
- Written by: Lennart Hellsing; Bengt Linder
- Produced by: Rune Waldekranz
- Starring: Egon Larsson; Åke Söderblom; Yvonne Lombard
- Cinematography: Göran Strindberg
- Edited by: Eric Nordemar
- Music by: Torbjörn Lundquist
- Production company: Sandrews
- Distributed by: Sandrew-Bauman
- Release date: 15 March 1958
- Running time: 97 minutes
- Country: Sweden
- Language: Swedish

The Koster Waltz (Swedish: Kostervalsen) is a 1958 Swedish romance film directed by Rolf Husberg and starring Egon Larsson, Åke Söderblom, Yvonne Lombard and Gaby Stenberg. It was shot at the Centrumateljéerna Studios in Stockholm. The film's sets were designed by the art director Nils Nilsson.

== Cast ==
- Egon Larsson as Kurt Granberg
- Åke Söderblom as Pelle Boman
- Yvonne Lombard as Maja Boman
- Gaby Stenberg as Birgit Anderberg
- Isa Quensel as Doris Fågelström
- Tilly Stephan as Mitzi Lachenberg
- Sven Lindberg as Bertram Johansson
- Einar Fagstad as Svalan Söderman
- Lars Egge as Konrad Anderberg
- Sangrid Nerf as Solveig
- Marie Ahlstedt as Student at holiday school
- Jessie Flaws as Ann
- Birgitta Ander as Chris
- Gunilla Asp as Student at holiday school
- Bernt Callenbo as Journalist
- Lars-Owe Carlberg as Polis
- Ulla Edin as Modell på reklambyrån
- Lilian Elgö as Flicka på reklambyrån
- Janne Eriksson as Pojken på reklambyrån
- Lauritz Falk as Henrik Åman
- Berit Frodi as Fru Nilsson, hembiträde
- Lennart Hellsing as Gäst på direktör Anderbergs båt
- Marita Holm as Student at holiday school
- Vincent Jonasson as Detektiv i Fjällbackas hamn
- Ann Karlén as Camilla
- Berit Kullander as Student at holiday school
- Torsten Lilliecrona as Reklambyrådirektör
- Sune Mangs as Fotograf
- Richard Mattsson as Advokat
- Lisbeth Redner as Student at holiday school
- Hanny Schedin as Andersson
- Sune Waldimir as Kapellmästaren
- Inga-Lill Åhström as Hilda

== Bibliography ==
- Krawc, Alfred. International Directory of Cinematographers, Set- and Costume Designers in Film: Denmark, Finland, Norway, Sweden (from the beginnings to 1984). Saur, 1986.
- Qvist, Per Olov & von Bagh, Peter. Guide to the Cinema of Sweden and Finland. Greenwood Publishing Group, 2000.
