= We House Slaves =

1942 film

- Directed by: Schamyl Bauman
- Written by: Christian Bogø (play); Axel Frische (play); Torsten Lundqvist; Schamyl Bauman
- Produced by: Rolf Husberg
- Starring: Dagmar Ebbesen; John Botvid; Ernst Eklund
- Cinematography: Hilmer Ekdahl
- Edited by: Rolf Husberg
- Music by: Erik Baumann
- Production company: Wivefilm
- Distributed by: Wivefilm
- Release date: 4 April 1942
- Running time: 90 minutes
- Country: Sweden
- Language: Swedish

We House Slaves (Swedish: Vi hemslavinnor) is a 1942 Swedish comedy film directed by Schamyl Bauman and starring Dagmar Ebbesen, John Botvid and Ernst Eklund. It was shot at the Centrumateljéerna Studios in Stockholm. The film's sets were designed by the art director Bibi Lindström. It was a remake of the 1933 film House Slaves, with Ebbesen reprising her role from the earlier film. Ebbesen had also played the role in a 1923 silent, eponymous version of the film.

== Cast ==
- Dagmar Ebbesen as Kristiana Falk
- John Botvid as Johan Blomqwist
- Ernst Eklund as Teodor Larsson
- Hjördis Petterson as Laura Larsson
- Karl-Arne Holmsten as Gunnar Andersson
- Maj-Britt Håkansson as Ingrid Larsson
- Kaj Hjelm as Palle Larsson
- Dagmar Olsson as Gullan, House-maid
- Carl-Gunnar Wingård as Calle Bergman
- Anna-Lisa Baude as Anna Bergman
- Julia Cæsar as Hanna
- Åke Engfeldt as Kadett Furustubbe
- Einar Axelsson as Baron Wolfgang
- Bengt Ekerot as Linus Tallhagen
- Bellan Roos as Springflicka
- Margit Andelius as Mrs. Karlsson
- Helga Brofeldt as Amanda
- Sickan Castegren as Guest
- Georg Fernqvist as Larssons Kamrer
- Jan-Erik Lindqvist as Kadett Hare
- Sten Mattsson as Varubud
- Mimi Pollak as Mrs. Rose Réenchrona
- Olav Riégo as Kristiana's Lawyer
- Lisa Wirström as Städerska

== Bibliography ==
- Per Olov Qvist & Peter von Bagh. Guide to the Cinema of Sweden and Finland. Greenwood Publishing Group, 2000.
