= Egon Larsson =

Swedish actor

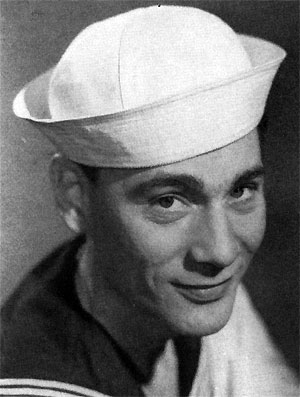
- Egon Larsson in 1951
- Born: 30 October 1914; Stockholm, Sweden
- Died: 7 February 1989 (aged 74); Helsingborg, Sweden
- Occupations: Singer, actor, dancer, director, choreographer
- Years active: 1933–1988

Egon Malte Larsson (30 October 1914 – 7 February 1989) was a Swedish singer, actor, dancer, director, choreographer, composer and writer. Larsson appeared in about 15 films between 1943 and 1958 and choreographed dance numbers in seven films.

Egon Larsson is buried at Kviberg Cemetery in Gothenburg.

== Selected filmography ==
- Det spökar - det spökar ... (1943)
- Gröna hissen (1944)
- Flottans kavaljerer (1948)
- Life at Forsbyholm Manor (1948)
- Södrans revy (1950)
- Två sköna juveler (1954)
- Flottans glada gossar (1954)
- Dance on Roses (1954)
- Flicka i kasern (1955)
- Foreign Intrigue (1955) (TV series)
- Sista natten (1956)
- The Koster Waltz (1958)
