= Agneta Lagerfeldt =

Swedish actress

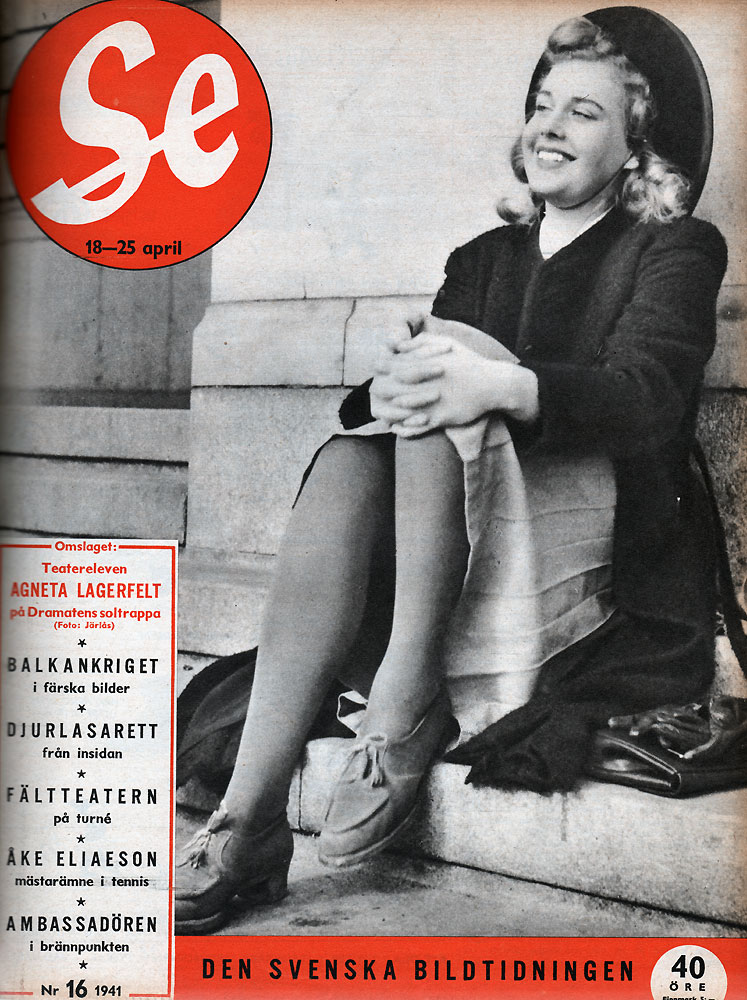
- Lagerfeldt on a magazine cover (1941)
- Born: 18 February 1919; Stockholm, Sweden
- Died: 27 January 2013 (aged 95); Stockholm, Sweden
- Occupation: Actress
- Years active: 1942-1947 (film)
- Spouse(s): Willy Peters (1943–1976; his death)

Agneta Lagerfeldt (1919–2013) was a Swedish stage and film actress. She also acted as a voice actress, dubbing foreign films for release in the Swedish market. She was married to the actor and director Willy Peters. The journalist Christian Peters is their son.

== Selected filmography ==
- Flames in the Dark (1942)
- A Girl for Me (1943)
- Young Blood (1943)
- Som folk är mest (1944)
- Fram för lilla Märta (1945)
- Love Goes Up and Down (1946)
- Brita in the Merchant's House (1946)
- Evening at the Djurgarden (1946)

== Bibliography ==
- Paietta, Ann C. Teachers in the Movies: A Filmography of Depictions of Grade School, Preschool and Day Care Educators, 1890s to the Present. McFarland, 2007.
