= Karin Nordgren =

Swedish actress (1919–2001)

- Born: 30 April 1919; Landskrona, Sweden
- Died: 20 January 2001 (aged 81); Stockholm, Sweden
- Occupation: Actress
- Years active: 1939–1942 (film)
- Spouse: Alf Kjellin (m. 1941; div. 1954)

Karin Nordgren (30 April 1919 – January 20, 2001) was a Swedish film and stage actress. She was married to actor Alf Kjellin from 1941 to 1954.

== Selected filmography ==
- Emilie Högquist (1939)
- Nothing But the Truth (1939)
- Kiss Her! (1940)
- June Night (1940)
- One, But a Lion! (1940)
- Lärarinna på vift (1941)
- Bright Prospects (1941)
- Poor Ferdinand (1941)
- Dunungen (1941)
- En sjöman i frack (1942)

== Bibliography ==
- Quirk, Lawrence J. The Films of Ingrid Bergman. Carol Publishing Group, 1975.
