= Thor Modéen =

Swedish actor

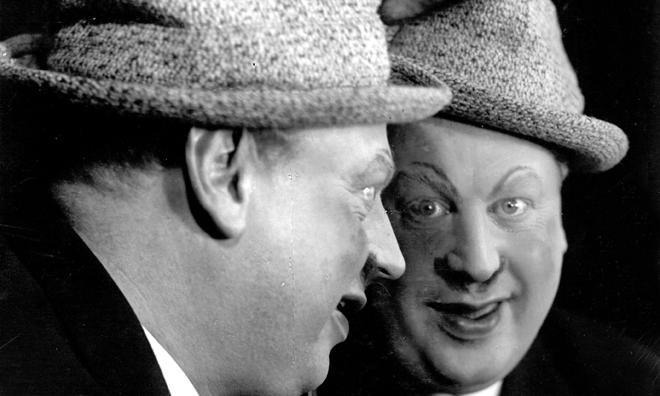
- Modéen in a Stockholm revue in 1935
- Born: 22 January 1898; Kungsör, Sweden
- Died: 28 May 1950 (aged 52); Stockholm, Sweden
- Occupations: Actor; Comedian
- Years active: 1923–1950

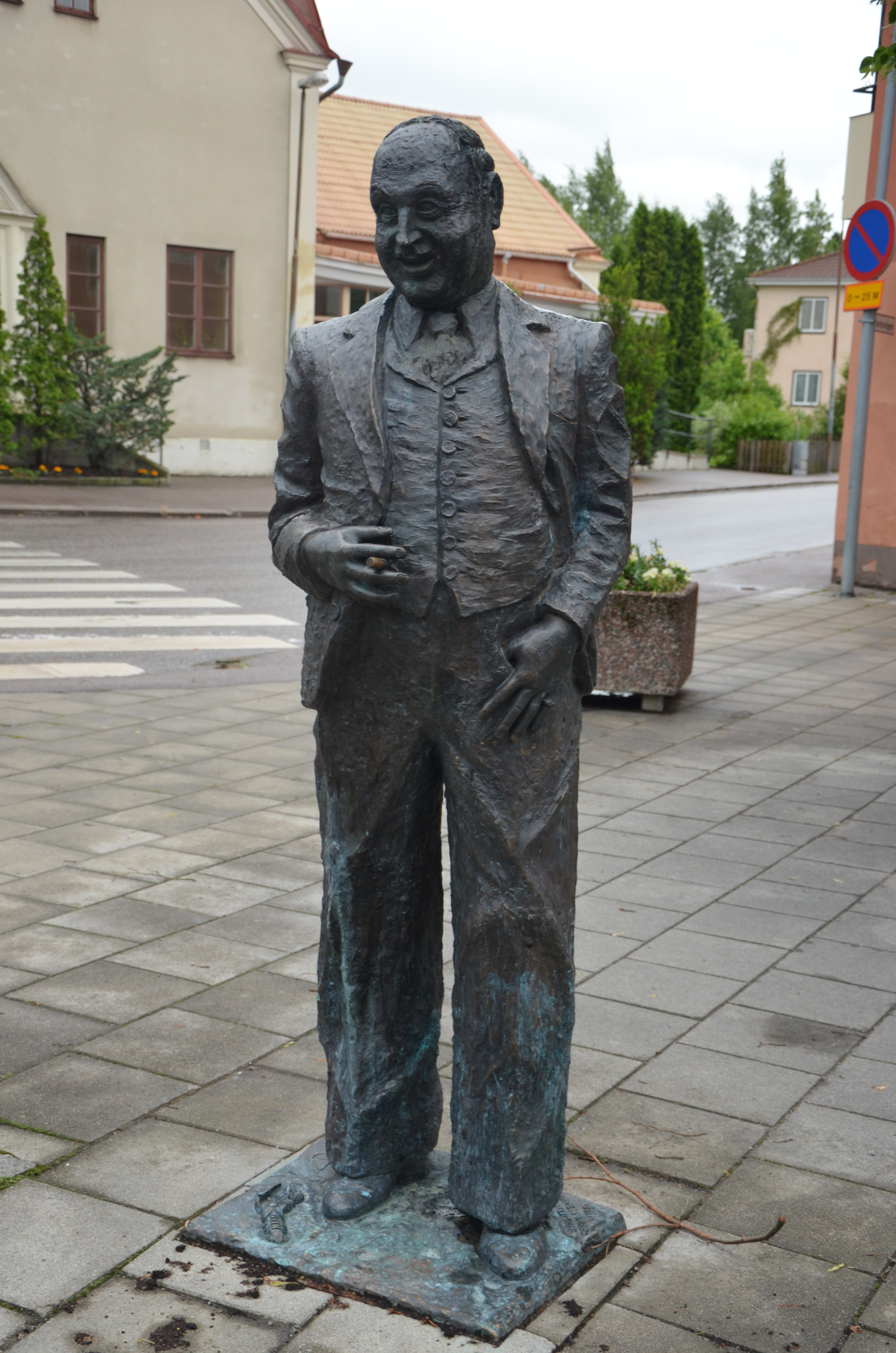
Statue of Thor Modéen at Kungsör, Sweden

Thor Modéen (22 January 1898 – 28 May 1950) was a Swedish actor and comedian who was active in both movies and on stage. Thor Modéen Teatern, a 3D cinema and theater in Kungsör, was named in his honor.

== Biography ==
Thor Odert Folke Modéen was born in Kungsör, Sweden. He began his career as a dancer and singer. He became a student with director Muck Linden at the Lorensberg Theater in Gothenburg in 1916 and subsequently appeared with Novilla, Folkteatern, Södra Teatern, Oscarsteatern, Vasateatern and Folkets hus in Stockholm.

He appeared in 88 films between 1923 and 1950. He mainly appeared in comedies, often worked with fellow comedians Åke Söderblom and John Botvid.

== Selected filmography ==
- The Tales of Ensign Stål (1926)
- The Devil and the Smalander (1927)
- The Ghost Baron (1927)
- Ship Ahoy! (1931)
- Love and Deficit (1932)
- Lucky Devils (1932)
- Two Men and a Widow (1933)
- Augusta's Little Misstep (1933)
- Boman's Boy (1933)
- Dear Relatives (1933)
- Andersson's Kalle (1934)
- En stilla flirt (1934)
- Simon of Backabo (1934)
- Fired (1934)
- The People of Småland (1935)
- Kungen kommer (1936)
- He, She and the Money (1936)
- It Pays to Advertise (1936)
- 65, 66 and I (1936)
- Unfriendly Relations (1936)
- Oh, Such a Night! (1937)
- Klart till drabbning (1937)
- Hotel Paradise (1937)
- Julia jubilerar (1938)
- Landstormens lilla Lotta (1939)
- Mot nya tider (1939)
- Between Us Barons (1939)
- Wanted (1939)
- Nothing But the Truth (1939)
- Swing it, magistern! (1940)
- The Crazy Family (1940)
- Kiss Her! (1940)
- Heroes in Yellow and Blue (1940)
- Med dej i mina armar (1940)
- Tonight or Never (1941)
- The Ghost Reporter (1941)
- We're All Errand Boys (1941)
- Poor Ferdinand (1941)
- How to Tame a Real Man (1941)
- Magistrarna på sommarlov (1941)
- The Train Leaves at Nine (1941)
- Adventurer (1942)
- Mister Collins' Adventure (1943)
- Little Napoleon (1943)
- Jolanta the Elusive Pig (1945)
- Lilla helgonet (1945)
- Fram för lilla Märta (1945)
- Harald the Stalwart (1946)
- The Night Watchman's Wife (1947)
- Private Karlsson on Leave (1947)
- Kärlek och störtlopp (1948)
- Life at Forsbyholm Manor (1948)
- Fiancée for Hire (1950)
