= Sunshine (1948 film) =

1948 film

- Directed by: Gösta Werner
- Written by: Sándor Faragó; Arne Mehrens
- Starring: Annalisa Ericson; Nils Ericsson; Georg Funkquist
- Cinematography: Karl-Erik Alberts
- Edited by: Eric Nordemar
- Music by: Sven-Erik Bäck; Gunnar Johansson
- Production company: Sveafilm
- Distributed by: Sveafilm
- Release date: 27 November 1948
- Running time: 88 minutes
- Country: Sweden
- Language: Swedish

Sunshine (Swedish: Solkatten) is a 1948 Swedish drama film directed by Gösta Werner and starring Annalisa Ericson, Nils Ericsson and Georg Funkquist. It was shot at the Imagoateljéerna Studios in the Stockholm suburb of Stocksund. The film's sets were designed by the art director Nils Nilsson.

== Synopsis ==
Monica Granström sets out to find who amongst four possible men is her real father.

== Cast ==
- Annalisa Ericson as Monica Granström
- Nils Ericsson as Peter Sundström
- Georg Funkquist as Johan Petrén
- Arnold Sjöstrand as Selim Hedberg
- Hugo Björne as Gustav Hellström
- Oscar Winge as Sven Gustafsson
- Marianne Löfgren as Amanda
- Einar Axelsson as Arvid Bjurstedt
- Hjördis Petterson as Klara Bjurstedt
- Åke Claesson as Jörgen Bure
- Jan Molander as Metusalem
- Naima Wifstrand as Helena
- Emmy Albiin as Guest in café
- Margit Andelius as Miss Hemlin
- Wiktor Andersson as Enockson, hotel porter
- Hilda Borgström as Aunt Margareta
- Christian Bratt as Eric Carle
- Inga Bucht as Waitress
- Julia Cæsar as Mrs. Råkberg
- Nils Hallberg as Demonstration participator
- Birgitta Hellerstedt as Anita
- Sven Melin as Clerk
- Saga Sjöberg as Guest in café

== Bibliography ==
- Cowie, Peter Françoise Buquet, Risto Pitkänen & Godfried Talboom. Scandinavian Cinema: A Survey of the Films and Film-makers of Denmark, Finland, Iceland, Norway, and Sweden. Tantivy Press, 1992.
- Qvist, Per Olov & von Bagh, Peter. Guide to the Cinema of Sweden and Finland. Greenwood Publishing Group, 2000.
