= Ingeborg Strandin =

Swedish opera singer and actress

Ingeborg Strandin (18 November 1881 – 8 March 1948) was a Swedish opera singer and actress.

Born in Stockholm as Ingeborg Lublin, Strandin made her film debut in the 1919 film His Lordship's Last Will directed by Victor Sjöström, and went on to participate in over 15 films.

== Selected filmography ==
- Boman at the Exhibition (1923)
- A Maid Among Maids (1924)
- The Marriage Game (1935)
- John Ericsson, Victor of Hampton Roads (1937)

=== Theatre ===
- Clara från Narvavägen (1920)
