= Unfriendly Relations =

1936 film

- Directed by: Anders Henrikson
- Written by: Börje Larsson; Åke Söderblom; Torsten Lundqvist
- Based on: Aunt Jutta from Calcutta by Max Reimann and Otto Schwartz
- Produced by: Harry Malmstedt
- Starring: Håkan Westergren; Karin Swanström; Gull-Maj Norin
- Cinematography: Martin Bodin
- Edited by: Rolf Husberg
- Music by: Jules Sylvain
- Production company: Wivefilm
- Distributed by: Wivefilm
- Release date: 27 July 1936
- Running time: 77 minutes
- Country: Sweden
- Language: Swedish

Unfriendly Relations (Swedish: Släkten är värst) is a 1936 Swedish comedy film directed by Anders Henrikson and starring Håkan Westergren, Karin Swanström and Gull-Maj Norin. It was shot at the Råsunda Studios in Stockholm. The film's sets were designed by the art director Arne Åkermark. It was based on the play Tante Jutta aus Kalkutta ("Aunt Jutta from Calcutta") by Max Reimann and Otto Schwartz, later adapted into a 1953 German film of the same title, directed by Karl Georg Külb.

== Synopsis ==
A bachelor living in Stockholm invents a family in order to get financial support from his wealthy aunt. Things are complicated, however, when she pays an unexpected visit to the city.

== Cast ==
- Håkan Westergren as Hasse, advokat
- Karin Swanström as Hans tant
- Gull-Maj Norin as May, hennes fosterdotter
- Nils Ericsson as Mille, skådespelare
- Maritta Marke as Hans fästmö
- Thor Modéen as Vallbäck-Nord, f.d. 'utbrytarkung'
- Eric Abrahamsson as Oscar, betjänt
- Carin Swensson as Lena
- Helge Andersson as Court Constable
- Valdemar Bentzen as Janitor
- Oscar Byström as Judge
- Eric Dahlström as Lawyer
- Eddie Figge as Woman at the Theatre
- Knut Frankman as Customs Clerk
- Hjördis Gille as Woman in Court
- John Hilke as Court Clerk
- Lilly Kjellström as Mrs. Andersson
- Thyra Leijman-Uppström as Woman in Court
- Arne Lindblad as Unit Manager at the Theatre
- Helge Mauritz as Actor at the Theatre
- Christian Schrøder as Janitor
- John Westin as Customs Clerk
- Oscar Åberg as District Attorney

== Bibliography ==
- Larsson, Mariah & Marklund, Anders. Swedish Film: An Introduction and Reader. Nordic Academic Press, 2010.
