= Lili Ziedner =

Swedish actress

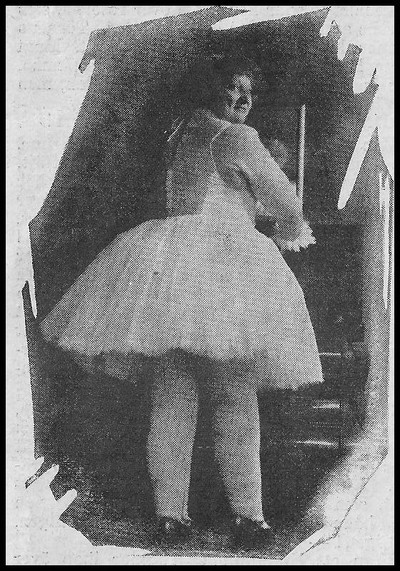
- Ziedner in 1929
- Born: 14 September 1885; Stockholm, Sweden
- Died: 10 February 1939 (aged 53); Stockholm, Sweden
- Occupation: Actress
- Years active: 1909–1939

Lili Ziedner (14 September 1885 – 10 February 1939) was a Swedish actress. She appeared in over twenty films between 1909 and 1939.

She died on 10 February 1939 in Stockholm. She had performed ten days before her death at Södra Teatern. She was buried at Norra begravningsplatsen on 15 February.

== Selected filmography ==
- Mannekängen (1913)
- Norrtullsligan (1922)
- Uncle Frans (1926)
- Colourful Pages (1931)
- The Love Express (1932)
- Transit Camp (1932)
- A Stolen Waltz (1932)
- Eva Goes Aboard (1934)
- A Wedding Night at Stjarnehov (1934)
- Close Relations (1935)
- Kvartetten som sprängdes (1936)
- Hotel Paradise (1937)
- Herr Husassistenten (1939)
- The Two of Us (1939)
