= The People of Högbogården =

1939 Swedish film

- Directed by: Arne Weel
- Written by: Jeppe Aakjær; Ragnar Holmström
- Based on: Livet paa Hegnsgaard by Jeppe Aakjær
- Produced by: Henning Karmark
- Starring: John Ekman; Linnéa Hillberg; Annalisa Ericson
- Cinematography: Karl Andersson
- Music by: Eric Westberg
- Production company: Nordisk Tonefilm
- Distributed by: Nordisk Tonefilm
- Release date: 9 October 1939
- Running time: 97 minutes
- Country: Sweden
- Language: Swedish

The People of Högbogården (Swedish: Folket på Högbogården) is a 1939 Swedish drama film directed by Arne Weel and starring John Ekman, Linnéa Hillberg and Annalisa Ericson. Location shooting took place around Gränna. It is based on a 1907 play by Danish writer Jeppe Aakjær, which Weel had directed as a Danish film Life on the Hegn Farm in 1938.

== Cast ==
- John Ekman as Ola Berg
- Linnéa Hillberg as Mrs. Karin Berg
- Annalisa Ericson as Greta Berg
- Bodil Kåge as Young Greta
- Peter Höglund as Arne Andersson
- Ragnar Planthaber as Young Arne
- Carl Ström as Per Sjövall
- Hilda Borgström as Per's Wife
- Wiktor Andersson as Farm-hand
- Carl Browallius as Old poor man
- Ivar Kåge as Nelson
- Oscar Ljung as Preacher
- John Melin as Mats Wilhelmsson
- Tekla Sjöblom as Old Woman
- Birgitta Valberg as Young Woman

== Bibliography ==
- Qvist, Per Olov & von Bagh, Peter. Guide to the Cinema of Sweden and Finland. Greenwood Publishing Group, 2000.
