= Allan Bohlin =

Swedish actor

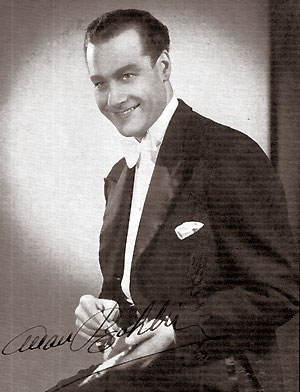
- Born: Karl Allan Clarence Bohlin; 5 November 1907; Stockholm, Sweden
- Died: 23 January 1959 (aged 51); Stockholm, Sweden
- Occupation: Actor
- Years active: 1934–1956

Allan Bohlin (5 November 1907 – 23 January 1959) was a Swedish film actor. He appeared in more than 40 films between 1934 and 1956.

== Selected filmography ==
- The Song to Her (1934)
- The Atlantic Adventure (1934)
- Walpurgis Night (1935)
- Under False Flag (1935)
- 65, 66 and I (1936)
- Johan Ulfstjerna (1936)
- Klart till drabbning (1937)
- The Andersson Family (1937)
- Oh, Such a Night! (1937)
- Landstormens lilla Lotta (1939)
- Whalers (1939)
- Variety Is the Spice of Life (1939)
- Oh, What a Boy! (1939)
- With Open Arms (1940)
- The Crazy Family (1940)
- Poor Ferdinand (1941)
- Lärarinna på vift (1941)
- The Train Leaves at Nine (1941)
- Lilla helgonet (1944)
- Oss tjuvar emellan eller En burk ananas (1945)
- Motherhood (1945)
- Crisis (1946)
- The Night Watchman's Wife (1947)
- Flottans kavaljerer (1948)
- The Red Horses (1954)
