= Hans Lindgren =

Swedish actor, screenwriter and film producer

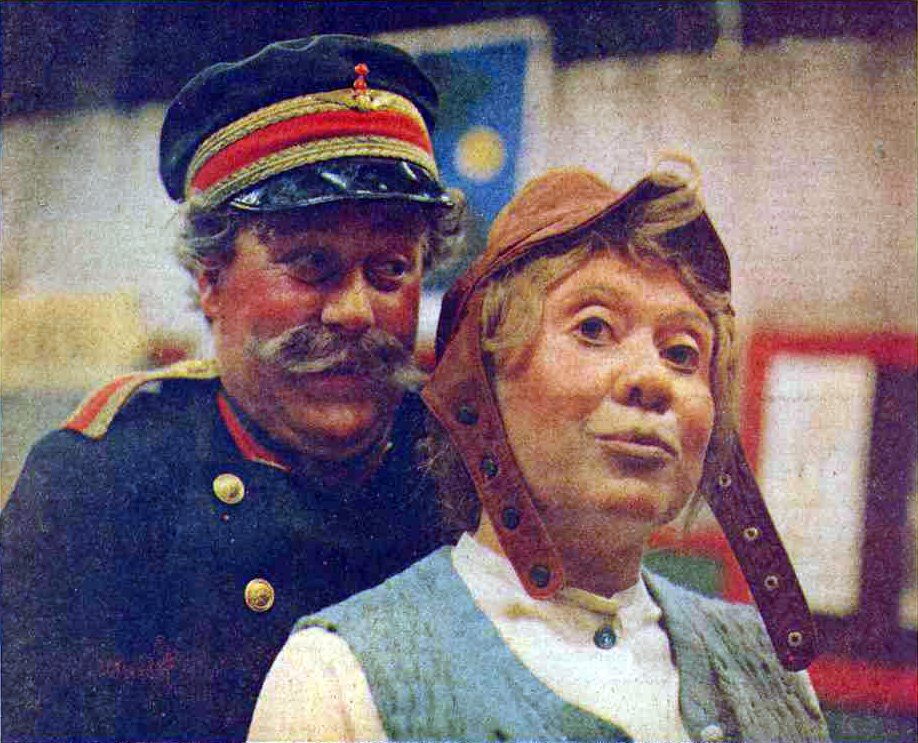
Hans Lindgren and Inga Gill in Klart spår till Tomteboda (Clear Track to Tomteboda)

Hans Olov Lindgren (6 January 1932 – 2 November 2012) was a Swedish actor and voice actor.

Lindgren was born in 1932 in Österåker, north of Stockholm, Sweden. He had his acting debut as a 10-year-old in 1942 in Vårat gäng by Gunnar Skoglund and starred in more than 40 film and television productions including Rännstensungar (1944), Barnen från Frostmofjället (1945) (where he starred Ante), Svenska Floyd (1961), and Bombi Bitt och jag (1968). In later years, Lindgren worked for the National Swedish Touring Theatre. He was married to Harriet Anna-Lisa Lindgren (1939–2007). Hans Lindgren narrated Ole Lukøje (Ol Dreamy) for the film The Snow Queen.

== Selected filmography ==
- Guttersnipes (1944)
- The Saucepan Journey (1950)
- Defiance (1952)
- Heart's Desire (1960)

== Selected filmography (Swedish dubbing) ==
- 1953: Peter Pan - Cubby (Hans later voiced Smee in the 2nd swedish dub from 1992)
- 1961: 101 Dalmatians - Pongo
- 1963: The Sword in the Stone - Sir Pelinore
- 1967: The Jungle Book - Kaa
- 1970: The Aristocats - Roquefort
- 1974: Robin Hood - Nutsy and Sexton
- 1977: The Rescuers - Bernard
- 1981: The Fox and the Hound - Dinky
- 1982: Snow White and the Seven Dwarfs - Happy
- 1983: Mickey's Christmas Carol - Goofy
- 1992: Goof Troop - Goofy
- 1995: The Secret of Nimh - Mr Ages
