= Boman at the Exhibition =

1923 film

- Directed by: Karin Swanström
- Written by: Oscar Hemberg; Oscar Rydqvist
- Starring: Karin Swanström; Georg Blomstedt; Wiktor Andersson; Ingeborg Strandin
- Cinematography: Gustav A. Gustafson
- Production company: Svensk Filmindustri
- Distributed by: Svensk Filmindustri
- Release date: 26 December 1923
- Running time: 76 minutes
- Country: Sweden
- Languages: Silent; Swedish intertitles

Boman at the Exhibition (Swedish: Boman på utställningen) is a 1923 Swedish silent comedy film directed by Karin Swanström and starring Swanström, Georg Blomstedt, Wiktor Andersson and Ingeborg Strandin. It was shot at the Råsunda Studios in Stockholm and on location in Gothenburg. The film's sets were designed by the art director Vilhelm Bryde.

== Cast ==
- Karin Swanström as Mrs. Sjöborg
- Georg Blomstedt as Boman
- Wiktor Andersson as Emanuel Göransson
- Ingeborg Strandin as Eulalia Göransson
- Harald Adelsohn as Adelsohn
- lsa Adenius as Ada
- Vilhelm Berndtson as Butler
- Gösta Björkman as Mailman
- Rudolf Bohman as Kålle
- Torre Cederborg as Elander
- Valdemar Ekegård as Ekegård
- Josef Fischer as Uncle Jörgen
- Karin Gardtman as Karin Sjöborg
- Carl Hagman as Persson
- Ann-Marie Kjellgren as Brita
- Nils Vilhelm Lund as Shoeshine
- Frans Pfunkenhofer as Johan Sjöborg

== Bibliography ==
- Gustafsson, Tommy. Masculinity in the Golden Age of Swedish Cinema: A Cultural Analysis of 1920s Films. McFarland, 2014.
- Wallengren, Ann-Kristin. Welcome Home Mr Swanson: Swedish Emigrants and Swedishness on Film. Nordic Academic Press, 2014.
- Wredlund, Bertil. Långfilm i Sverige: 1920-1929. Proprius, 1987.
