= Sven Sköld =

Swedish composer

- Born: 20 July 1899; Lidingö, Sweden
- Died: 23 October 1956 (aged 57); Sweden
- Occupation: Composer
- Years active: 1937-1956 (film)

Sven Sköld (July 20, 1899 – October 23, 1956) was a Swedish conductor and composer of film scores. He often collaborated with the film director Arne Mattsson. His score for Mattsson's 1951 film One Summer of Happiness won an award at the 1952 Cannes Film Festival.

== Selected filmography ==
- The Old Clock at Ronneberga (1944)
- Barnen från Frostmofjället (1945)
- Johansson and Vestman (1946)
- Rail Workers (1947)
- Girl from the Mountain Village (1948)
- Stronger Than the Law (1951)
- One Summer of Happiness (1951)
- The Clang of the Pick (1952)
- All the World's Delights (1953)
- The Shadow (1953)
- No Man's Woman (1953)
- Salka Valka (1954)
- Enchanted Walk (1954)
- The People of Hemsö (1955)
- Men in the Dark (1955)
- Paradise (1955)
- The Minister of Uddarbo (1957)

== Bibliography ==
- Kwiatkowski, Aleksander. Swedish Film Classics: A Pictorial Survey of 25 Films from 1913 to 1957. Courier Dover Publications, 1983.
