= Fröken Chic =

- Directed by: Hasse Ekman
- Written by: Hasse Ekman
- Produced by: Svensk Filmindustri
- Starring: Sickan Carlsson; Hasse Ekman; Meg Westergren; Herman Ahlsell
- Release date: 26 January 1959
- Running time: 91 minutes
- Country: Sweden
- Language: Swedish

Fröken Chic (English: Miss Chic) is a 1959 Swedish comedy film, directed by Hasse Ekman.

== Plot summary ==
The talent agent Buster Carell is near bankruptcy when his biggest talent, a singing lumberjack, runs off with the company funds. While watching a TV quiz show, he discovers Isabella Linder, who sings a little song after winning. Carell seeks her out and offers her a contract. She is not tempted, she wants to stay a school teacher, but Carell is not a man that takes no for an answer.

== Cast ==
- Sickan Carlsson as Isabella Linder, teacher
- Hasse Ekman as Buster Carell
- Meg Westergren as Margareta "Baby" Langenhielm
- Herman Ahlsell as Krister van Boren
- Sif Ruud as Miss Trimling, Busters secretary
- Hjördis Petterson as Rita Rang, writer, Isabellas aunt
- Sigge Fürst as Hagenius
- Stig Järrel as Urbàhn, show host in Kvitt eller dubbelt
- Yngve Gamlin as professor Gårdvar, judge in Kvitt eller dubbelt
- Elsa Carlsson as Margit van Boren, countess, Kristers mother
- Olof Sandborg as Hugo van Boren, count, Kristers father
- Carl-Gunnar Wingård as headmaster Malte Rylander
