= Mister Collins' Adventure =

1943 film

- Directed by: Anders Henrikson
- Written by: Anders Henrikson; Bengt Idestam-Almquist
- Based on: Mister Collins' Adventure by Frank Heller
- Starring: Anders Henrikson; Birgit Sergelius; Thor Modéen; Elof Ahrle
- Cinematography: Elner Åkesson
- Edited by: Ragnar Engström
- Music by: Sven Rüno
- Production company: Centrumfilm
- Distributed by: Wivefilm
- Release date: 27 August 1943
- Running time: 96 minutes
- Country: Sweden
- Language: Swedish

Mister Collins' Adventure (Swedish: Herr Collins äventyr) is a 1943 Swedish comedy film directed by and starring Anders Henrikson and also featuring Birgit Sergelius, Thor Modéen and Elof Ahrle. It was based on a novel by Frank Heller, which had previously been made into 1925 silent film The Adventure of Mr. Philip Collins. It was shot at the Centrumateljéerna Studios in Stockholm. The film's sets were designed by the art director Bertil Duroj.

== Synopsis ==
Filip Collin, a small-town Swedish lawyer makes unwise speculations and loses his clients money on financial speculation. He heads abroad hoping to recoup his losses, heading first to Denmark and then to London. After revenging himself on a man who cheated him out of money, he establishes himself as a first-class confidence trickster. Despite the ineffectual pursuit of Inspector Kenyon of Scotland Yard, he is ultimately able to escape his career of crime thanks to the attractive Mary von Holten and a friend Russian Grand Duke.

== Cast ==
- Anders Henrikson as Filip Collin
- Birgit Sergelius as Mary von Holten
- Thor Modéen as Grand Duke
- Elof Ahrle as Graham
- Stig Järrel as Grossmith
- Torsten Winge as Lavertisse
- Rune Carlsten as Kenyon
- Håkan Westergren as Vivitj
- Ragnar Widestedt as Sir John
- Carl-Gunnar Wingård as Walters
- Marianne Löfgren as Duchess

== Bibliography ==
- Krawc, Alfred. International Directory of Cinematographers, Set- and Costume Designers in Film: Denmark, Finland, Norway, Sweden (from the beginnings to 1984). Saur, 1986.
