= Hotel Paradise (1937 film) =

1937 film

- Directed by: Weyler Hildebrand
- Written by: Artur Enell; Robert Wahlberg
- Produced by: Robert Wahlberg
- Starring: Thor Modéen; Maritta Marke; Nils Ericson
- Cinematography: Erik Bergstrand
- Edited by: Rolf Husberg
- Music by: Eric Bengtson; Jules Sylvain; Evert Taube
- Production company: AB Stockholmfilm
- Distributed by: Wivefilm
- Release date: 8 February 1937
- Running time: 79 minutes
- Country: Sweden
- Language: Swedish

Hotel Paradise (Swedish: Pensionat Paradiset) is a 1937 Swedish comedy film directed by Weyler Hildebrand and starring Thor Modéen, Maritta Marke and Nils Ericson. It was shot at the Råsunda Studios in Stockholm. The film's sets were designed by the art director Arne Åkermark.

== Synopsis ==
The guests of a boarding house, the Hotel Paradise, anxiously await the arrival of an opera singer. When a tailor turns up he is mistaken for the singer and has to imitate the role.

== Cast ==
- Thor Modéen as Julle Bergström
- Maritta Marke as Lotta Bergström
- Nils Ericson as Nisse
- Julia Cæsar as Elvira Pettersson
- Greta Ericsson as Margit
- Carl Hagman as Don Carlos
- Lili Ziedner as Ms. Cronblom
- Carl-Gunnar Wingård as Pålsson
- Folke Helleberg as Eric Karlsson
- Arthur Fischer as Kihlman AKA Baron de Planche
- John Botvid as Fernlund
- Hugo Jacobsson as Svärd
- Hugo Bolander as Recording Clerk
- Helga Brofeldt as Pensions Guest
- Sigge Fürst as Singing man on steam boat
- Sven-Eric Gamble as Pelle Pålsson
- Hjördis Gille as Ms. Ström
- Linnéa Hillberg as Countess Klingenhjelm
- Arne Lindblad as Pensions Guest
- Richard Lund as Jonsson
- Siri Olson as Pensions Guest
- Åke Uppström as Mr. Roos
- Bullan Weijden as Mrs. Pålsson

== Soundtrack ==
- Thor Modéen – "En Äkta Mexikanare" (Music and Lyrics by Jules Sylvain and Sven Paddock)

== Bibliopgraphy ==
- Sundholm, John . Historical Dictionary of Scandinavian Cinema. Scarecrow Press, 2012.
- Wallengren, Ann-Kristin. Welcome Home Mr Swanson: Swedish Emigrants and Swedishness on Film. Nordic Academic Press, 2014.
