= Dunungen =

1941 Swedish film

- Directed by: Weyler Hildebrand
- Written by: Weyler Hildebrand
- Based on: Dunungen by Selma Lagerlöf
- Starring: Karin Nordgren; Adolf Jahr; Hilda Borgström
- Cinematography: Julius Jaenzon
- Edited by: Oscar Rosander
- Music by: Gunnar Johansson
- Production company: Svensk Filmindustri
- Distributed by: Svensk Filmindustri
- Release date: 26 December 1941
- Running time: 90 minutes
- Country: Sweden
- Language: Swedish

Dunungen is a 1941 Swedish historical drama film directed by Weyler Hildebrand and starring Karin Nordgren, Adolf Jahr and Hilda Borgström. It is based on the 1914 play of the same title by Selma Lagerlöf inspired by an earlier story of hers, which had previously been made into a 1919 silent film. It was shot at the Råsunda Studios in Stockholm and on location at Nyköping. The film's sets were designed by the art director Arne Åkermark.

== Cast ==
- Karin Nordgren as Anne-Marie Ehinger
- Adolf Jahr as Teodor Fristedt
- Hilda Borgström as Gunilla Fristedt
- George Fant as Mauritz Fristedt
- Gaby Stenberg as Elisabet Westling
- Viran Rydkvist as Frida
- John Ericsson as Karl-Otto
- Wiktor Andersson as Wilhelmsson, gardener
- Åke Claesson as Borgström
- Eric Gustafson as Sekter Kolmodin
- Yngve Nyqvist as Fristedt, mayor
- Millan Bolander as Mrs. Fristedt
- Olle Hilding as Ehinger
- Stina Ståhle as Mrs. Ehinger
- Astrid Bodin as Beata, housemaid
- David Erikson as Liljesson, policeman
- Ingemar Holde as Baker's boy
- Magnus Kesster as Johan
- Ingrid Luterkort as Teodor's maid
- Julius Mengarelli as Dancer at the party
- Artur Rolén as Nyberg
- Birger Sahlberg as Westling, Elisabeth's father

== Bibliography ==
- Goble, Alan. The Complete Index to Literary Sources in Film. Walter de Gruyter, 1999.
- Iverson, Gunnar, Widding Soderbergh, Astrid & Soila, Tytti. Nordic National Cinemas. Routledge, 2005.
