= Barnen från Frostmofjället =

- Directed by: Rolf Husberg
- Screenplay by: Rolf Husberg
- Story by: Laura Fitinghoff
- Produced by: Schamyl Bauman
- Cinematography: Olle Nordemar; Sven Nykvist
- Music by: Sven Sköld
- Release date: 18 September 1945
- Running time: 102 minutes
- Country: Sweden
- Language: Swedish

Barnen från Frostmofjället is a 1945 Swedish film, directed by Rolf Husberg. It is based on the novel with the same name by Laura Fitinghoff. The story concerns seven orphans and a goat named Gullspira travelling in northern Sweden during the 1860s. The name of the goat, Gullspira, is now used for the award for the best children's film maker.

== Cast ==
- Hans Lindgren as Ante
- Siv Hansson as Maglena
- Anders Nyström as Månke
- Ann-Sophie Honeth as Anna-Lisa (credited as Fiffi Hornett)
- Ulf Berggren as Per-Erik
- Paula Jagæus as Brita-Kajsa (credited as Paula Jageus)
- Christina Jagæus as Märta-Greta (credited as Kristina Jageus)
- John Ericsson as Sko-Pelle
- Dora Söderberg as Britta
- Ragnar Falck as Artur Grape
- Britta Brunius as Mrs. Grape
- Birger Åsander as Stor-Anders
- Karin Högel as Dordi
- Ingrid Luterkort as Brita
- Helge Hagerman as Oskar Niva
- Solveig Hedengran as Mrs. Niva
- Gunnar Sjöberg as Vicar
- Axel Högel as Peasant
- Carl Deurell as Stor-Jon, a peasant (credited as Karl Deurell)
- Carl Ericson as a peasant (credited as Karl Eriksson)
