= Love and Dynamite =

1934 film

- Directed by: O.A.C. Lund
- Written by: Richard Lindström; O.A.C. Lund
- Starring: Valdemar Dalquist; Birgit Sergelius; Isa Quensel
- Cinematography: Gustav Byström; Hugo Edlund
- Music by: Jules Sylvain
- Production company: Sveriges Biografägares Distributionsbyrå
- Distributed by: Sveriges Biografägares Distributionsbyrå
- Release date: 25 November 1933
- Running time: 93 minutes
- Country: Sweden
- Language: Swedish

Love and Dynamite (Swedish: Kärlek och dynamit) is a 1933 Swedish drama film directed and co-written by O.A.C. Lund and starring Valdemar Dalquist, Birgit Sergelius and Isa Quensel. It is now considered to be a lost film.

== Synopsis ==
An engineer takes the daughter of Gustafsson, the owner of the shipbuilding yard he works at, on an unauthorised cruise and is fired by her father. Later he is able to rescue one of his ships that has run aground by using dynamite to shift it and Gustafsson becomes reconciled to him marrying his daughter.

== Cast ==
- Steinar Jøranndstad as Ragge
- Valdemar Dalquist as Gustafsson
- Signe Lundberg-Settergren as Mrs. Gustafsson
- Birgit Sergelius as Anna-Greta
- Isa Quensel as Rosa
- Holger Löwenadler as Axel
- Einar Fagstad as Olle
- Eric Abrahamsson as Öl-Pelle
- Georg Rydeberg as Ture, insurance agent
- Nils Leander as Stranger

== Bibliography ==
- Krawc, Alfred. International Directory of Cinematographers, Set- and Costume Designers in Film: Denmark, Finland, Norway, Sweden (from the beginnings to 1984). Saur, 1986.
- Wredlund, Bertil & Lindfors, Rolf. Långfilm i Sverige: 1930-1939. Proprius, 1983.
