= A Stolen Waltz =

1932 film

- Directed by: Lorens Marmstedt
- Written by: Eric Roos
- Produced by: Lorens Marmstedt
- Starring: Ernst Eklund; Ragnar Falck; Aino Taube
- Cinematography: Adrian Bjurman
- Edited by: Adrian Bjurman
- Music by: Olof Thiel
- Production company: AB Irefilm
- Distributed by: AB Irefilm
- Release date: 4 February 1932
- Running time: 83 minutes
- Country: Sweden
- Language: Swedish

A Stolen Waltz (Swedish: En stulen vals) is a 1932 Swedish drama film directed and produced by Lorens Marmstedt and starring Ernst Eklund, Ragnar Falck and Aino Taube.

== Synopsis ==
Inga, a struggling music student living in a Stockholm boarding house, overhears a piece of music and submits it as her own composition the following day. Allan, a music publisher, is impressed and buys the rights to the tune. However, Inga feels guilt over stealing the music from its unknown author.

== Cast ==
- Ernst Eklund as Allan Dehner
- Ragnar Falck as Ludvig Fryckt
- Aino Taube as Inga
- Anna-Lisa Baude as Miss Gullkvist
- Maritta Marke as Black Sheep
- Erik 'Bullen' Berglund as Hovmästare
- Lili Ziedner as Ursula
- Gunnel Lindgren as Eva
- Eric Abrahamsson as Alarik Berenius
- Jenny Tschernichin-Larsson as Kristina
- Doris Nelson as Agata
- Sickan Carlsson as Aina
- Erik Forslund as Juror
- Hanny Schedin as Garderobiär
- Ulla Sorbon as Pensionatsgäst
- Carl-Gunnar Wingård as Head Waiter
- Wiktor Andersson as Hobo

== Bibliography ==
- Qvist, Per Olov & von Bagh, Peter. Guide to the Cinema of Sweden and Finland. Greenwood Publishing Group, 2000.
