= Valdemar Dalquist =

Swedish actor

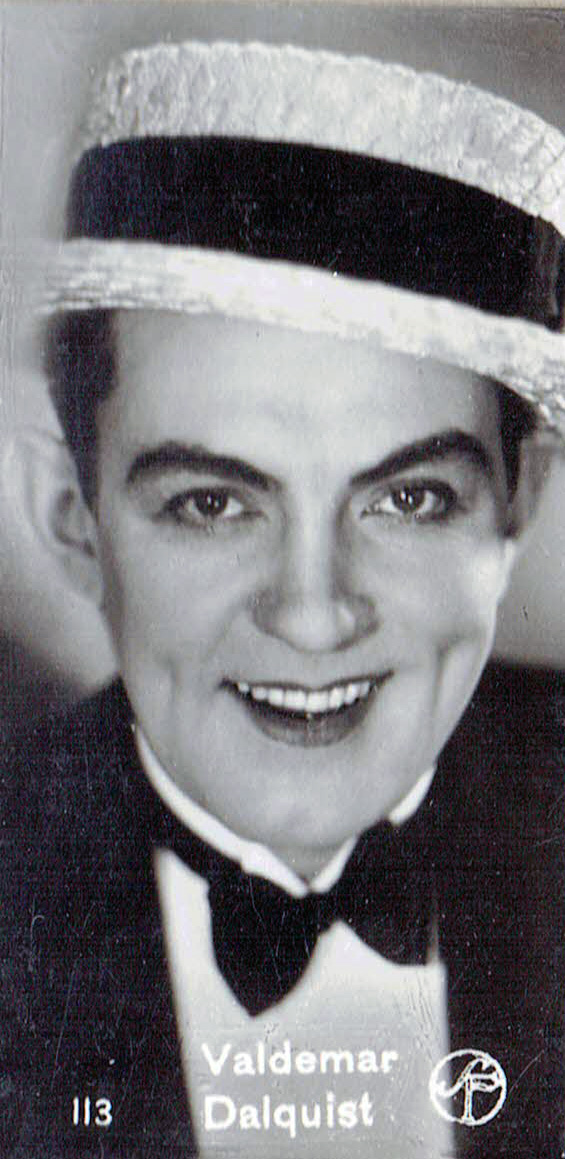
- Born: 23 September 1888; Grästorp, Sweden
- Died: 20 January 1937 (aged 48); Stockholm, Sweden
- Occupation: Actor
- Years active: 1921-1937 (film)

Valdemar Dalquist (September 23, 1888 – January 20, 1937) was a Swedish stage and film actor.

== Selected filmography ==
- Cirkus Bimbini (1921)
- Cavaliers of the Crown (1930)
- Tired Theodore (1931)
- Colourful Pages (1931)
- Love and Dynamite (1933)
- House Slaves (1933)
- The Atlantic Adventure (1934)
- The Count of the Old Town (1935)
- It Pays to Advertise (1936)

== Bibliography ==
- Chandler, Charlotte. Ingrid: Ingrid Bergman, A Personal Biography. Simon and Schuster, 2007.
- Wallengren, Ann-Kristin. Welcome Home Mr Swanson: Swedish Emigrants and Swedishness on Film. Nordic Academic Press, 2014.
