= Annalisa Ericson =

Swedish actress

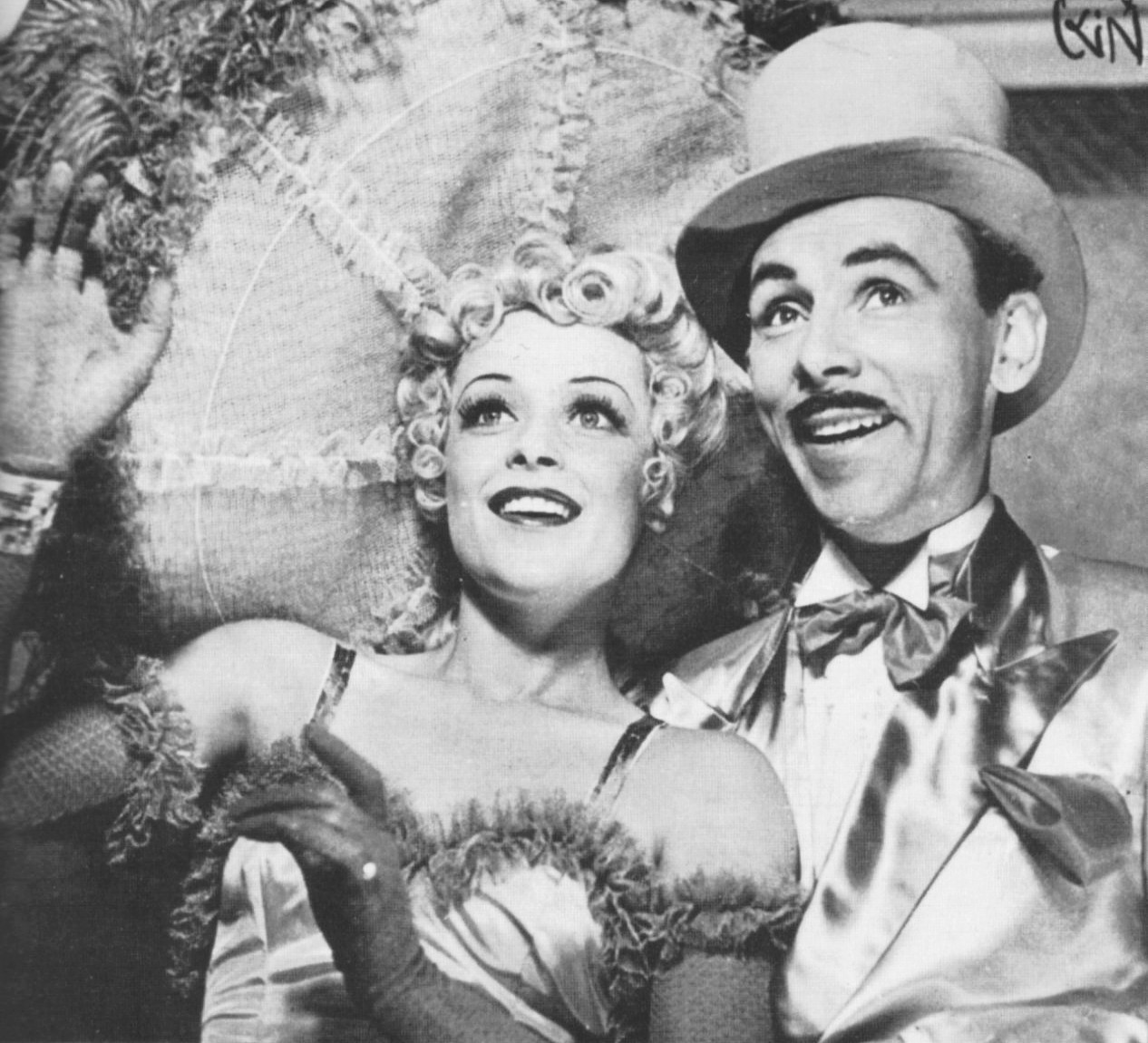
- Annalisa Ericson together with Nils Poppe in 1942.
- Born: 14 September 1913; Stockholm, Sweden
- Died: 21 April 2011 (aged 97); Stockholm, Sweden
- Occupation: Actress
- Years active: 1930–1993
- Spouse(s): Gunnar Wijkström (1939–?) (divorced); Uno von Segebaden (1942–?) (divorced) (1 child); Jurgen Schildt (2 July 1964–1990) (his death)
- Children: Claes (born 1943)

Annalisa Ericson (14 September 1913 – 21 April 2011) was a Swedish actress best known for her roles in 58 Swedish movies between 1930 and 1991.

The core of her acting work though took place on various theatres in Stockholm. Starting with ballet in 1919, she made her first work on the stage at the Royal Opera in Stockholm. After quitting the ballet in 1930, she became an acting student and made her first appearances in various plays and revues. Her first break in the movies was Värmlänningarna in 1932. Mixing revues with light comedy films, she slowly gained herself a name. In the 1940s she appeared in a number of musicals with actor Nils Poppe where the couple became known for their acrobatic dancing.

== Later years ==
In the 1950s, she mainly appeared in musicals and revues. As far as her movie career is concerned, she took part in a string of crime thrillers directed by Arne Mattsson. Her last film role was in 2004's Annalisa och Sven.

== Death ==
Ericson died on 21 April 2011, at the age of 97.

== Selected filmography ==
- Frida's Songs (1930)
- Colourful Pages (1931)
- The False Millionaire (1931)
- Mother-in-Law's Coming (1932)
- The Atlantic Adventure (1934)
- The Ghost of Bragehus (1936)
- Mother Gets Married (1937)
- Comrades in Uniform (1938)
- The People of Högbogården (1939)
- Kiss Her! (1940)
- The Crazy Family (1940)
- One, But a Lion! (1940)
- The Ghost Reporter (1941)
- Little Napoleon (1943)
- His Majesty Must Wait (1945)
- Tired Theodore (1945)
- Poor Little Sven (1947)
- Don't Give Up (1947)
- The Bride Came Through the Ceiling (1947)
- Sunshine (1948)
- The Kiss on the Cruise (1950)
- Say It with Flowers (1952)
- The Green Lift (1952)
- House of Women (1953)
- Café Lunchrasten (1954)
- Dance in the Smoke (1954)
- The Unicorn (1955)
- The Lady in Black (1958)
- Rider in Blue (1959)

== Sources ==
- Obituary - Svenska Dagbladet (Swedish)
