= Defiance (1952 film) =

1952 film

- Directed by: Gustaf Molander
- Written by: Vilgot Sjöman
- Based on: Lektorn by Vilgot Sjöman
- Produced by: Allan Ekelund
- Starring: Anders Henrikson; Per Oscarsson; Harriet Andersson; Eva Dahlbeck
- Cinematography: Åke Dahlqvist
- Edited by: Oscar Rosander
- Music by: Erik Nordgren
- Production company: Svensk Filmindustri
- Distributed by: Svensk Filmindustri
- Release date: 15 September 1952
- Running time: 95 minutes
- Country: Sweden
- Language: Swedish

Defiance (Swedish: Trots) is a 1952 Swedish drama film directed by Gustaf Molander and starring Anders Henrikson, Per Oscarsson, Harriet Andersson and Eva Dahlbeck. It was shot at the Råsunda Studios in Stockholm and on location in Solna. The film's sets were designed by the art director Nils Svenwall.

== Synopsis ==
A teacher imposes harsh discipline on his unruly son and the pupils in his class.

== Cast ==
- Anders Henrikson as Uno Thörner
- Per Oscarsson as Rolf Thörner
- Harriet Andersson as Siv aka Sivan
- Eva Dahlbeck as Teacher
- John Elfström as Siv's Father
- Marianne Löfgren as Lisa
- Hugo Björne as Pater de Blaye
- Hjördis Petterson as Erika, teacher
- Stig Järrel as Principal
- Viveca Serlachius as Inga
- Jarl Kulle as Jerka
- Christina Lundquist as Marianne
- Hans Lindgren as Ove, Rolf's friend
- Wiktor Andersson as Taxi driver
- Renée Björling as Ove and Marianne's mother
- Elsa Ebbesen as Neighbour
- Björn Berglund as Teacher
- Ernst Brunman as Teacher
- Göthe Grefbo as Young man
- Erna Groth as Dancing young woman
- Kaj Hjelm as Benke
- Ragnar Klange as Teacher
- Segol Mann as Teacher
- Anders Nyström as School boy

== Bibliography ==
- Qvist, Per Olov & von Bagh, Peter. Guide to the Cinema of Sweden and Finland. Greenwood Publishing Group, 2000.
