= The Train Leaves at Nine =

1941 film

- Directed by: Ivar Johansson
- Written by: Gösta Rodin
- Starring: Thor Modéen; Torsten Winge; Allan Bohlin
- Cinematography: Albert Rudling
- Edited by: Ivar Johansson
- Music by: Gunnar Johansson
- Production company: Sonora Film
- Release date: 15 November 1941
- Running time: 66 minutes
- Country: Sweden
- Language: Swedish

The Train Leaves at Nine (Swedish: Tåget går klockan 9) is a 1941 Swedish comedy film directed by Ivar Johansson and starring Thor Modéen, Torsten Winge and Allan Bohlin. It was shot at the Råsunda Studios in Stockholm. The film's sets were designed by the art director Arne Åkermark.

== Cast ==
- Thor Modéen as Oskar Reyner
- Torsten Winge as Fredrik Reyner
- Allan Bohlin as Thomas Linder
- Gaby Stenberg as Gun Lagerstroem
- Lill-Tollie Zellman as Anne-Marie
- Carl Hagman as Werner
- Carl Ström as Magnusson
- Sten Lindgren as Edkvist
- Eric Gustafson as Sandberg
- Ragnar Widestedt as Persson
- John Botvid as Police Captain
- Ingrid Envall as Miss Olsson
- David Erikson as First Gentleman
- Hartwig Fock as Policeman
- Folke Helleberg as Policeman
- Eric Laurent as Hedberg
- Signe Lundberg-Settergren as Mrs. Forsberg
- Helge Mauritz as Second Gentleman
- Artur Rolén as Westerlund
- Gösta Bodin as Taxi Driver
- Åke Wedholm as Third Gentleman

== Bibliography ==
- Qvist, Per Olov & von Bagh, Peter. Guide to the Cinema of Sweden and Finland. Greenwood Publishing Group, 2000.
