= Gaby Stenberg =

Swedish actress

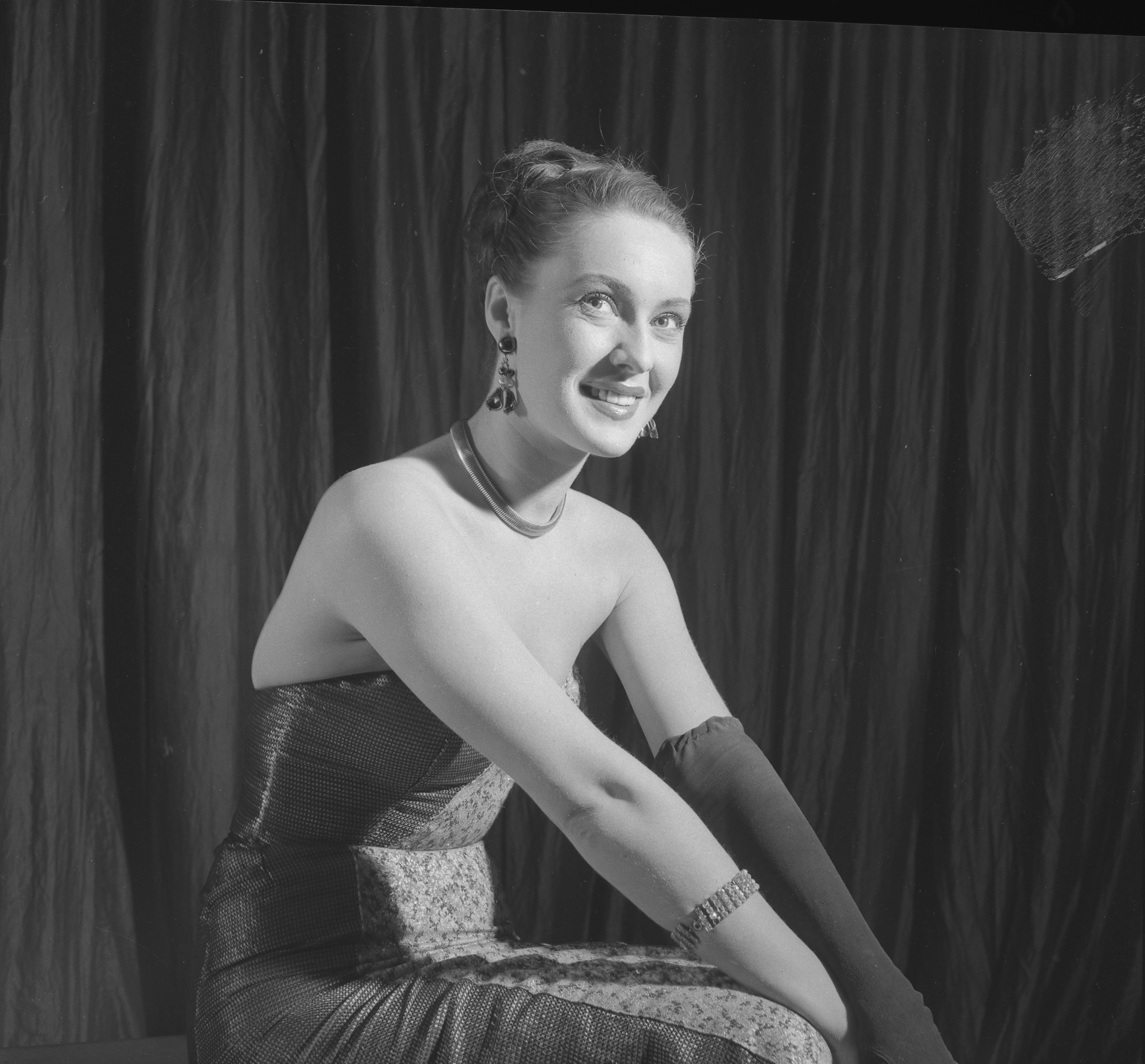
- Stenberg in 1951
- Born: Ida Gabriella Stenberg; 9 January 1923; Tokyo, Japan
- Died: 20 September 2011 (aged 88); Saltsjö-Boo, Sweden
- Occupation: Actress
- Years active: 1936–2002

Ida Gabriella Stenberg (9 January 1923 – 20 September 2011) was a Swedish actress. She appeared in forty films between 1936 and 1994.

== Selected filmography ==
- Kiss Her! (1940)
- With Open Arms (1940)
- The Train Leaves at Nine (1941)
- Poor Ferdinand (1941)
- Dunungen (1941)
- Goransson's Boy (1941)
- The Green Lift (1944)
- Don't Give Up (1947)
- No Way Back (1947)
- Dinner for Two (1947)
- Thirst (1949)
- Hendes store aften (1954)
- Night Light (1957)
- Mother Takes a Vacation (1957)
- Miss April (1958)
- The Koster Waltz (1958)
- Sängkammartjuven (1959)
- Sune's Christmas (1991)
