= Herman Ahlsell =

Swedish director and actor (1919–1994)

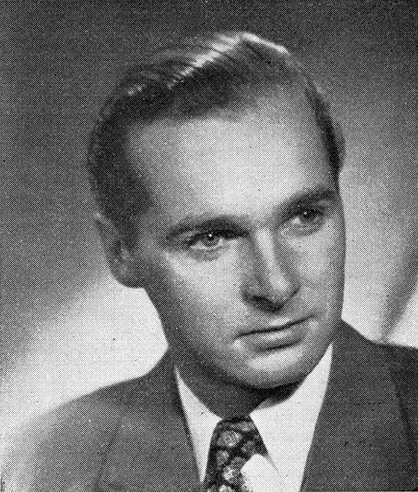
- Born: 4 October 1919; Danderyd, Sweden
- Died: 18 October 1994 (aged 75); Hovås, Sweden
- Occupations: Director, actor
- Years active: 1941-1984

Herman Adolf Ludvig Ahlsell (4 October 1919 – 18 October 1994) was a Swedish director and actor. Ahlsell studied at the Royal Dramatic Training Academy from 1938 to 1940. He is the father of Puck and Tom Ahlsell.

== Filmography ==
Year	Title	Role	Notes
1944	Vi behöver varann		
1952	Farlig kurva	Robert 'Robban' Printzell	
1954	En karl i köket	Olle Larsson	
1955	Getting Married	Lieutenant	Uncredited
1955	Sista ringen	Teacher	
1955	Farligt löfte	Bertil Strand	
1957	Lille Fridolf blir morfar	Egon Canon	
1959	Fröken Chic	Krister van Boren	
1959	A Lion in Town	Carl-Adam Pettersson	
1960	Domaren	Chief of Police	
1961	Lita på mej, älskling!	Hans	
1963	Lyckodrömmen	Hurtander	
1965	Ett sommaräventyr	Henrik	
