= Wiktor Andersson =

Swedish actor (1887–1966)

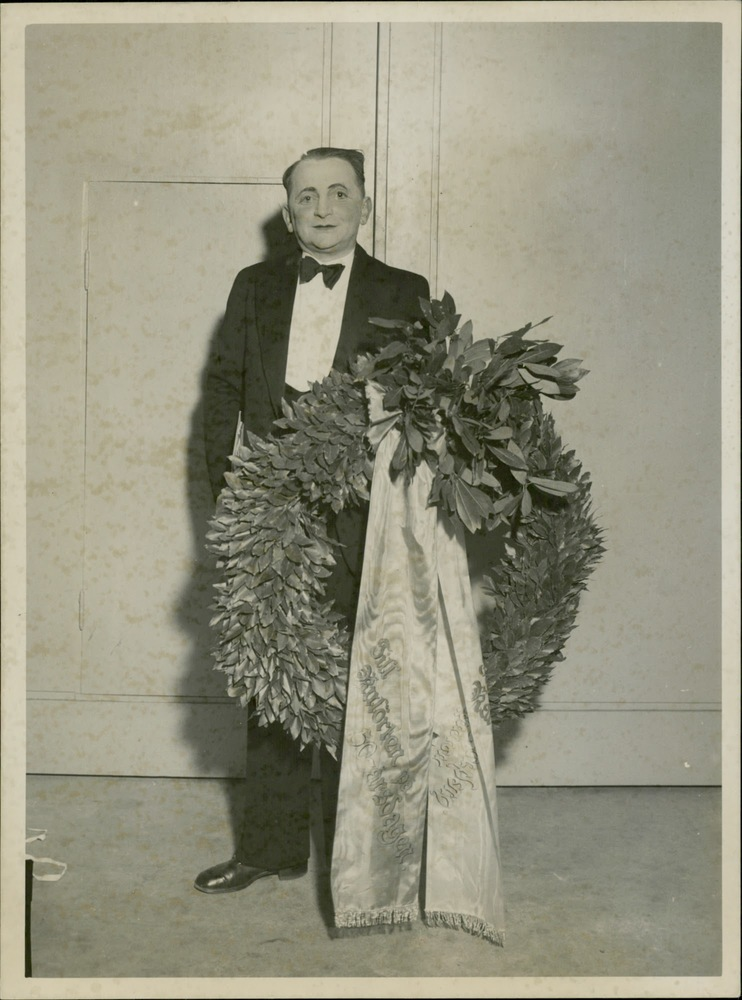
- Born: Wiktor Herman Andersson; 19 June 1887; Kungsbacka, Sweden
- Died: 13 September 1966 (aged 79); Stockholm, Sweden
- Occupation: Actor
- Years active: 1923–1958

Wiktor Herman "Kulörten" Andersson (19 June 1887 – 13 September 1966) was a Swedish film actor. He appeared in more than 160 films between 1923 and 1958.

== Selected filmography ==
- Boman at the Exhibition (1923)
- A Stolen Waltz (1932)
- Marriageable Daughters (1933)
- Two Men and a Widow (1933)
- What Do Men Know? (1933)
- Fired (1934)
- The People of Småland (1935)
- Under False Flag (1935)
- Ocean Breakers (1935)
- The Wedding Trip (1936)
- Conscientious Objector Adolf (1936)
- The Family Secret (1936)
- Sara Learns Manners (1937)
- Good Friends and Faithful Neighbours (1938)
- We at Solglantan (1939)
- The People of Högbogården (1939)
- Västkustens hjältar (1940)
- Her Melody (1940)
- With Open Arms (1940)
- Woman on Board (1941)
- The Ghost Reporter (1941)
- Goransson's Boy (1941)
- Dunungen (1941)
- Lasse-Maja (1941)
- Only a Woman (1941)
- The Poor Millionaire (1941)
- Nothing Is Forgotten (1942)
- Adventurer (1942)
- Men of the Navy (1943)
- In Darkest Smaland (1943)
- She Thought It Was Him (1943)
- The Sixth Shot (1943)
- Count Only the Happy Moments (1944)
- The Old Clock at Ronneberga (1944)
- Kungliga patrasket (1945)
- Oss tjuvar emellan eller En burk ananas (1945)
- Crisis (1946)
- Harald the Stalwart (1946)
- Evening at the Djurgarden (1946)
- The Bells of the Old Town (1946)
- Affairs of a Model (1946)
- Don't Give Up (1947)
- Kvarterets olycksfågel (1947)
- The Bride Came Through the Ceiling (1947)
- Crime in the Sun (1947)
- The Girl from the Marsh Croft (1947)
- A Swedish Tiger (1948)
- Private Bom (1948)
- Loffe the Tramp (1948)
- Sunshine (1948)
- Loffe as a Millionaire (1948)
- The Swedish Horseman (1949)
- Playing Truant (1949)
- Dangerous Spring (1949)
- The Street (1949)
- Two Stories Up (1950)
- Andersson's Kalle (1950)
- The Motor Cavaliers (1950)
- The Kiss on the Cruise (1950)
- When Love Came to the Village (1950)
- Customs Officer Bom (1951)
- Beef and the Banana (1951)
- Living on 'Hope' (1951)
- Love (1952)
- Defiance (1952)
- The Clang of the Pick (1952)
- Say It with Flowers (1952)
- Blondie, Beef and the Banana (1952)
- For the Sake of My Intemperate Youth (1952)
- Åsa-Nisse on Holiday (1953)
- The Chieftain of Göinge (1953)
- The Shadow (1953)
- All the World's Delights (1953)
- Time of Desire (1954)
- Young Summer (1954)
- The People of Hemsö (1955)
- Tarps Elin (1956)
- Woman in a Fur Coat (1958)
- Åsa-Nisse in Military Uniform (1958)
- Laila (1958)
- The Jazz Boy (1958)
- The Great Amateur (1958)
