= House Slaves (1933 film) =

1933 film

- Directed by: Ragnar Widestedt
- Written by: Christian Bogø (play); Axel Frische (play); Gösta Stevens
- Starring: Dagmar Ebbesen; Isa Quensel; Hasse Ekman
- Cinematography: Hilmer Ekdahl
- Music by: Helge Lindberg
- Production company: Nordisk Film
- Distributed by: Nordisk Film
- Release date: 10 April 1933
- Running time: 80 minutes
- Country: Sweden
- Language: Swedish

House Slaves (Swedish: Hemslavinnor) is a 1933 Swedish comedy film directed by Ragnar Widestedt and starring Dagmar Ebbesen, Isa Quensel and Hasse Ekman. It is a remake of the 1923 silent film of the same title, also starring Ebbesen. A separate Danish-language version Den ny husassistent was also produced.

Ebbesen also reprised her role in a 1942 remake of the film called We House Slaves.

== Synopsis ==
Greta is recruited as a maid in the house of the middle class Rosenqvist family.

== Cast ==
- Dagmar Ebbesen Kristina
- Isa Quensel as Greta
- Valdemar Dalquist as Palle Rosenqvist
- Anna Widforss as Klara Rosenqvist
- Hasse Ekman as Kurt Rosenqvist
- Maj Törnblad as Inga
- Håkan Westergren as Einar Nilsson
- Olav Riégo as Bergman
- Signe Wirff as Mrs. Bergman
- Eric Abrahamsson as K.A. Jönsson
- Gösta Bodin as Vacuum cleaner salesman
- Rulle Bohman as Mr. Borg
- Ludde Juberg as Anton Björketopp

== Bibliography ==
- Freiburg, Jeanne Ellen. Regulatory Bodies: Gendered Visions of the State in German and Swedish Cinema. University of Minnesota, 1994.
- Qvist, Per Olov & Von Bagh, Peter . Guide to the Cinema of Sweden and Finland. Greenwood Publishing Group, 2000.
