= Äsperöd =

Locality in Sweden

- Location within Skåne Location within Sweden
- Coordinates: 55°37′N 13°55′E
- Country: Sweden
- Province: Skåne
- County: Skåne County
- Municipality: Sjöbo Municipality

Area
  - Total: 0.27 km^{2} (0.10 sq mi)

Population (31 December 2010)
  - Total: 222
  - Density: 817/km^{2} (2,120/sq mi)
- Time zone: UTC+1 (CET)
  - Summer (DST): UTC+2 (CEST)

Äsperöd is a locality situated in Sjöbo Municipality, Skåne County, Sweden with 222 inhabitants in 2010.
