= Fred Godfrey =

Fred or Frederick Godfrey may refer to:

- Fred Godfrey (bandmaster) (1837–1882), English bandmaster and music arranger
- Fred Godfrey (footballer) (1910–1989), Australian footballer
- Fred Godfrey (songwriter) (1880–1953), Welsh songwriter
- Frederick Race Godfrey (1828–1910), Australian pioneer and politician

== See also ==
- Godfrey (name)
