= Kiss Her! =

1940 film

- Directed by: Weyler Hildebrand
- Written by: Weyler Hildebrand; Torsten Lundqvist
- Starring: Annalisa Ericson; Thor Modéen; Åke Söderblom
- Cinematography: Martin Bodin
- Edited by: Oscar Rosander
- Music by: Gunnar Johansson; Jules Sylvain
- Production company: Film AB Imago
- Distributed by: Fribergs Filmbyrå AB
- Release date: 17 May 1940
- Running time: 90 minutes
- Country: Sweden
- Language: Swedish

Kiss Her! (Swedish: Kyss henne!) is a 1940 Swedish comedy film directed and co-written by Weyler Hildebrand and starring Annalisa Ericson, Thor Modéen and Åke Söderblom. It is a loose adaptation of the 1933 German film And Who Is Kissing Me?.

The film's sets were designed by Arne Åkermark.

== Cast ==
- Annalisa Ericson as Lisa Larsson
- Thor Modéen as Manager Gravander
- Åke Söderblom as Åke Brenner, banker
- Eric Abrahamsson as Senior accountant Karlsson
- Hjördis Petterson as Rosa Blom
- John Botvid as Senior accountant Niklasson
- Viran Rydkvist as Mrs. Pallin
- Gustaf Lövås as Taxi driver
- Gaby Stenberg as Ingrid Boman
- Sigge Fürst as Krans, private driver
- Linnéa Hillberg as Mrs. Andersson
- Hugo Björne as Chairman of the board
- Gunnar Almqvist as Member of the board
- Margit Andelius as Miss Gren
- Bertil Berglund as Constable
- Erland Colliander as Palmqvist, editor
- Nils Dahlgren as Police inspector Antonsson
- Olle Ek as Maitre d', Restaurang Intime
- Kerstin Ekwall as Telephone operator at the bank
- David Erikson as Creditor
- Wilma Florice as Dancer
- Eric Fröling as Brixman, Åke's friend
- Gösta Grip as Journalist
- Alli Halling as Elsa, actress
- Gustaf Hedström as Guest on Restaurang Intime
- Hortensia Hedström as Guest on Restaurang Intime
- Gottfrid Holde as Creditor
- Arne Hülphers as Band leader
- Axel Isaksson as Journalist
- Albert Johansson as Creditor
- Helge Kihlberg as Doorman
- Gerda Landgren as Mrs. Holmdahl
- Sven Aage Larsen as Dance instructor
- Arne Lindblad as Creditor
- Richard Lund as Colonel, member of the board
- Erik Molin as Assistant police inspector
- Karin Nordgren as Dancer
- Yngve Nyqvist as Chamberlain, member of the board
- Siri Olson as Clerk
- Charley Paterson as Manager Landell
- Artur Rolén as Waiter
- Bellan Roos as Cleaning woman
- May Sandart as Dancer
- Georg Skarstedt as Journalist
- Yngve Sköld as Piano player at the theatre
- Adèle Söderholm as Adéle, dresser
- Majken Torkeli as Dancer
- Gustaf Unger as Dancer
- Eric von Gegerfelt as Member of the board
- Elsa Marianne von Rosen as Dancer
- Alice Wallis as Clerk
- Anna Widforss as Countess Kattgull
- Lisa Wirström as Ticket seller
- Oscar Åberg as Member of the board

== Bibliography ==
- Ulrich J. Klaus. Ergänzungen 1929/30 - 1945. Klaus-Archiv, 2006.
