= House Slaves (1923 film) =

1923 Swedish film

- Directed by: Ragnar Widestedt
- Written by: Christian Bogø (play); Axel Frische (play); Ragnar Hyltén-Cavallius; Sam Ask
- Produced by: Stellan Claësson; Karin Swanström
- Starring: Dagmar Ebbesen; Agda Helin; Karin Swanström
- Cinematography: Ragnar Westfelt
- Edited by: Ragnar Westfelt
- Production company: Bonnierfilm
- Distributed by: Svenska Filmkompaniet
- Release date: 24 September 1923
- Running time: 93 minutes
- Country: Sweden
- Languages: Silent; Swedish intertitles

House Slaves (Swedish: Hemslavinnor) is a 1923 Swedish silent comedy film directed by Ragnar Widestedt and starring Dagmar Ebbesen, Agda Helin and Karin Swanström. It was based on a 1920 Danish play which first appeared in Sweden in 1921. It was shot at studios in Kungsholmen in Stockholm with location shooting at Ränneslätt.

The plot revolves around Grethe, a young woman who heads to Stockholm to find work as a domestic servant. Ebbesen reprised the role of Kristina in the 1933 remake of the same name, in the 1942 film We House Slaves as well as over five hundred times on stage.

== Cast ==
- Dagmar Ebbesen as Kristina Mikkelsen
- Agda Helin as Grethe
- Elvin Ottoson as Palle Rasmussen
- Karin Swanström as Mathilde Rasmussen
- Erik Hoffman as Josef
- Olav Riégo as Sophus Sörensen
- Lia Norée as Anna Sörensen
- Fritz Strandberg as Tobias Klementsen
- Josua Bengtson as Carpenter
- Tyra Dörum as Carpenter's Wife
- Elsa Ebbesen as Job seeking girl
- Hartwig Fock as Vacuum cleaner salesman
- Karl Hellgren as Einar - Grethe's fiancé
- Torsten Lennartsson as Customer at employment office
- Emma Meissner as Fru Stjernholm
- August Tollquist as Anselm - Kristiana's brother

== Bibliography ==
- Freiburg, Jeanne Ellen. Regulatory Bodies: Gendered Visions of the State in German and Swedish Cinema. University of Minnesota, 1994.
- Qvist, Per Olov & Von Bagh, Peter . Guide to the Cinema of Sweden and Finland. Greenwood Publishing Group, 2000.
