= Ittla Frodi =

Swedish actress (1931–2003)

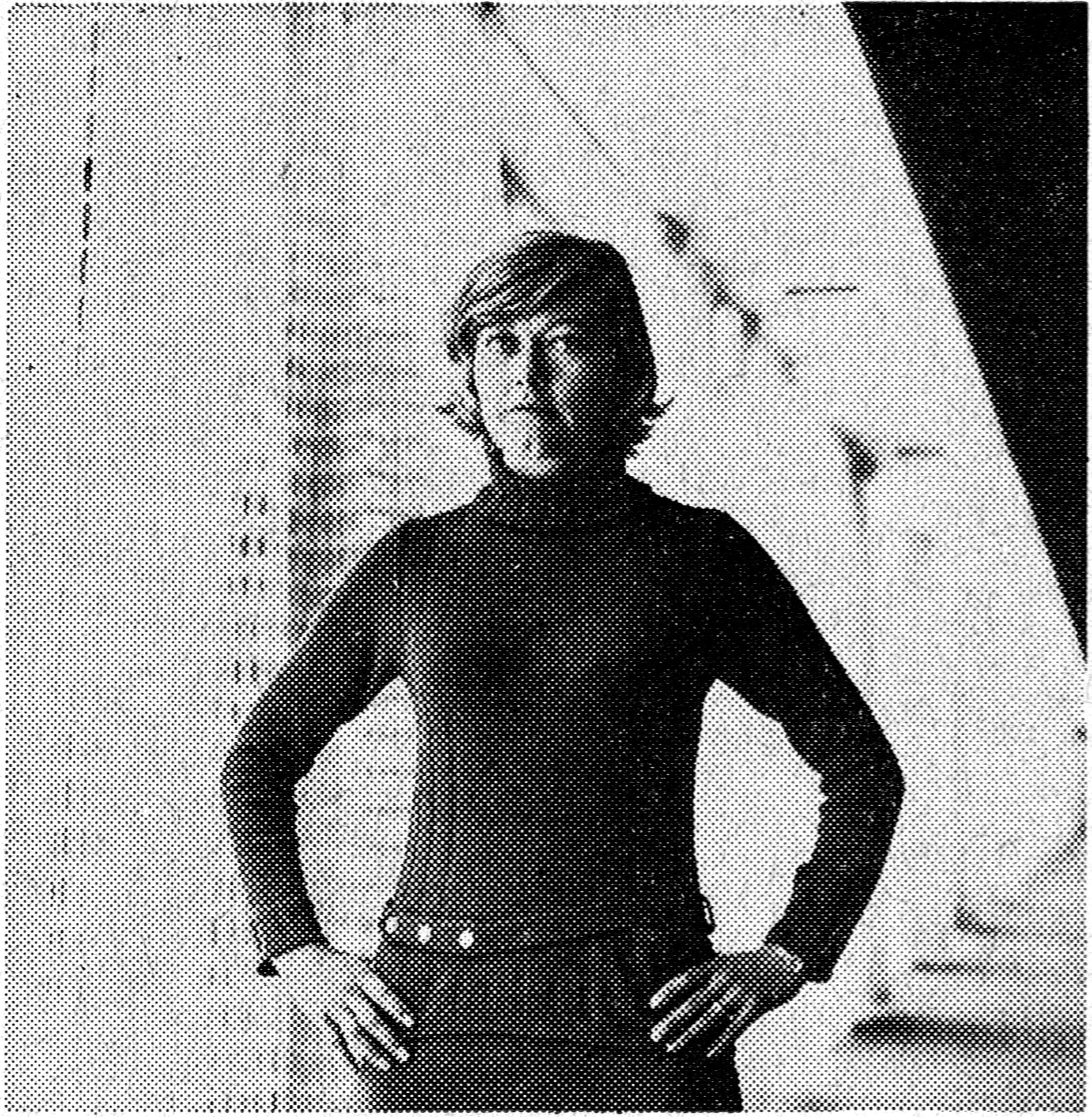
- Born: Ingvor Frodi; 17 February 1931; Gothenburg, Sweden
- Died: 18 February 2003 (aged 72); Gothenburg, Sweden
- Occupation(s): Actress, writer, producer
- Years active: 1954-1971

Ittla Frodi (17 February 1931 – 18 February 2003) was a Swedish actress, writer and producer. Frodi appeared in about 15 films between 1954 and 1971.

== Selected filmography ==
- En karl i köket (1954)
- The Girl in the Rain (1955)
- We at Väddö (1958)
- Space Invasion of Lapland (1959)
- Sköna Susanna och gubbarna (1959)
- Vi fixar allt (1961)
- Åsa-Nisse bland grevar och baroner (1961)
- Hällebäcks gård (1961)
- The Mannequin (1968)
- Tant Grön, tant Brun och tant Gredelin (1968)
- Maid in Sweden (1971)
