= Nils Ericson (actor) =

Swedish actor

- Born: 14 March 1906; Torsåker, Gävleborg County, Sweden
- Died: 6 April 1980 (aged 74); Stockholm, Sweden
- Occupations: Actor, singer
- Years active: 1928-1972

Nils "Nisse" Lennart Ericson (14 March 1906 – 6 April 1980) was a Swedish actor and singer. Ericson appeared in over 25 films between 1928 and 1972.

== Selected filmography ==
- Gustaf Wasa (1928)
- For Her Sake (1930)
- Cavaliers of the Crown (1930)
- Swedenhielms (1935)
- Under False Flag (1935)
- Unfriendly Relations (1936)
- Conscientious Objector Adolf (1936)
- Hotel Paradise (1937)
- Sun Over Sweden (1938)
- Just a Bugler (1938)
- The Sin of Anna Lans (1943)
- Nyordning på Sjögårda (1944)
- Evening at the Djurgarden (1946)
- Sunshine (1948)
- Life at Forsbyholm Manor (1948)
- Min syster och jag (1950)
- Kronans glada gossar (1952)
- 47:an Löken (1971)
