= Rolf Husberg =

Swedish film director, film editor and screenwriter (1908–1998)

- Born: John Rolf Husberg; 20 June 1908; Stockholm, Sweden
- Died: 2 November 1998 (aged 90); Stockholm, Sweden
- Occupation(s): Director, cinematographer, screenwriter, actor
- Years active: 1925–1972
- Spouse: Ninni Löfberg

John Rolf Husberg (20 June 1908 – 2 November 1998) was a Swedish film director, cinematographer, screenwriter and actor. Husberg directed over 30 films between 1939 and 1965.

== Selected filmography ==
- Say It with Music (1929)
- Colourful Pages (1931)
- Dear Relatives (1933)
- Marriageable Daughters (1933)
- People of Hälsingland (1933)
- What Do Men Know? (1933)
- Two Men and a Widow (1933)
- The Song to Her (1934)
- Andersson's Kalle (1934)
- The Atlantic Adventure (1934)
- Fired (1934)
- It Pays to Advertise (1936)
- He, She and the Money (1936)
- The Ghost of Bragehus (1936)
- Conscientious Objector Adolf (1936)
- Unfriendly Relations (1936)
- 65, 66 and I (1936)
- Witches' Night (1937)
- Russian Flu (1937)
- Adolf Strongarm (1937)
- Happy Vestköping (1937)
- Hotel Paradise (1937)
- Career (1938)
- Between Us Barons (1939)
- A Crime (1940)
- The Bjorck Family (1940)
- Heroes in Yellow and Blue (1940)
- A Real Man (1940)
- The Three of Us (1940)
- The Ghost Reporter (1941)
- We House Slaves (1942)
- Life and Death (1943)
- His Excellency (1944)
- Blåjackor (1945)
- Barnen från Frostmofjället (1945)
- Love Goes Up and Down (1946)
- Evening at the Djurgarden (1946)
- Bill Bergson, Master Detective (1947)
- Sampo Lappelill (1949)
- Son of the Sea (1949)
- Andersson's Kalle (1950)
- Beef and the Banana (1951)
- Bill Bergson and the White Rose Rescue (1953)
- All the World's Delights (1953)
- Flottans glada gossar (1954)
- En karl i köket (1954)
- Luffaren och Rasmus (1955)
- The Stranger from the Sky (1956)
- Moon Over Hellesta (1956)
- Räkna med bråk (1957)
- Laila (1958)
- The Koster Waltz (1958)
- The Die Is Cast (1960)
- Heart's Desire (1960)
