= List of Swedish films of the 1930s =

This is a list of films produced in Sweden and in the Swedish language in the 1930s.

== 1930 ==
| English Title | Director | Cast | Genre | Swedish Title | Notes |
|---|---|---|---|---|---|
| Cavaliers of the Crown | Gustaf Edgren | Fridolf Rhudin, Brita Appelgren, Weyler Hildebrand | Comedy | Kronans kavaljerer | |
| Charlotte Löwensköld | Gustaf Molander | Pauline Brunius, Gertrud Pålson-Wettergren, Birgit Sergelius | Drama | Charlotte Löwensköld | |
| The Doctor's Secret | John W. Brunius | Ivan Hedqvist, Pauline Brunius, Olof Sandborg | Drama | Doktorns hemlighet | Co-production with US |
| Father and Son | Victor Sjostrom | Rudolf Rittner, Franziska Kinz, Martin Herzberg | Drama | Väter und Söhne | Co-production with Germany |
| For Her Sake | Paul Merzbach | Gosta Ekman, Inga Tidblad, Håkan Westergren | Comedy | För hennes skull | |
| Frida's Songs | Gustaf Molander | Elisabeth Frisk, Bengt Djurberg, Tore Svennberg | Comedy | Fridas visor | |
| The People of Norrland | Theodor Berthels | Carl Barcklind, Elisabeth Frisk, Georg Blomstedt | Drama | Norrlänningar | |
| The Two of Us | John W. Brunius | Edvin Adolphson, Margit Manstad, Erik Berglund | Drama | Vi två | Co-production with US |
| Ulla, My Ulla | Julius Jaenzon | Ake Claesson, Brita Appelgren, Åke Claesson | Historical | Ulla min Ulla | |

== 1931 ==
| English Title | Director | Cast | Genre | Swedish Title | Notes |
|---|---|---|---|---|---|
| Colourful Pages | Edvin Adolphson, Valdemar Dalquist | Lili Ziedner, Gösta Ekman, Dagmar Ebbesen | Comedy | Brokiga blad | |
| Dangerous Paradise | Rune Carlsten | Elisabeth Frisk, Ragnar Arvedson | Drama | Farornas paradis | Co-production with US |
| Dante's Mysteries | Paul Merzbach | Dante, Elisabeth Frisk, Zarah Leander | Drama | Dantes mysterier | |
| The False Millionaire | Paul Merzbach | Fridolf Rhudin, Zarah Leander, Annalisa Ericson | Comedy | Falska millionären | Co-production with France |
| The Girl from Värmland | Erik A. Petschler | Erik A. Petschler, Gucken Cederborg, Arnold Sjöstrand | Drama | Flickan från Värmland | |
| Half Way to Heaven | Rune Carlsten | Elisabeth Frisk, Edvin Adolphson, Karin Swanström | Drama | Halvvägs till himlen | Co-production with US |
| Longing for the Sea | John W. Brunius | Edvin Adolphson, Carl Barcklind, Inga Tidblad | Drama | Längtan till havet | Co-production with France |
| Love and the Home Guard | Schamyl Bauman | Gideon Wahlberg, Gösta Gustafson, Ernst Brunman | Comedy | Kärlek och landstorm | |
| A Night of Love by the Öresund | Sölve Cederstrand, Ragnar Widestedt | Erik Berglund, Elisabeth Frisk, Theodor Berthels | Comedy | En kärleksnatt vid Öresund | |
| The Red Day | Gustaf Edgren | Sigurd Wallén, Dagmar Ebbesen, Sture Lagerwall | Comedy | Röda dagen | |
| Ship Ahoy! | Gustaf Edgren | Fridolf Rhudin, Weyler Hildebrand, Brita Appelgren | Comedy | Skepp ohoj! | |
| Skipper's Love | Ivar Johansson | Weyler Hildebrand, Einar Fagstad, Aino Taube | Comedy | Skepparkärlek | |
| Tired Theodore | Gustaf Edgren | Valdemar Dalquist, Karin Swanström, Brita Appelgren | Comedy | Trötte Teodor | Co-production with France |

== 1932 ==
| English Title | Director | Cast | Genre | Swedish Title | Notes |
|---|---|---|---|---|---|
| Black Roses | Gustaf Molander | Ester Roeck-Hansen, Einar Axelsson, Karin Swanström | Drama | Svarta rosor | |
| His Life's Match | Per-Axel Branner | Georg Blomstedt, Björn Berglund, Birgit Tengroth | Comedy | Hans livs match | |
| International Match | Gunnar Skoglund | Georg Blomstedt, Fritiof Billquist, Olof Sandborg | Drama | Landskamp | |
| Jolly Musicians | Theodor Berthels, Weyler Hildebrand | Anna Olin, Lasse Dahlquist, Isa Quensel | Comedy | Muntra musikanter | |
| Love and Deficit | Gustaf Molander | Sigurd Wallén, Tutta Rolf, Edvin Adolphson | Comedy | Kärlek och kassabrist | |
| The Love Express | Lorens Marmstedt | Isa Quensel, Einar Axelsson, Nils Ohlin | Drama | Kärleksexpressen | |
| Lucky Devils | Ivar Johansson, Sigurd Wallén | Erik Berglund, Maritta Marke, Tutta Rolf | Comedy | Lyckans gullgossar | |
| Modern Wives | Edvin Adolphson | Ivar Kåge, Margit Manstad, Elsa Carlsson | Drama | Modärna fruar | |
| Mother-in-Law's Coming | Paul Merzbach | Karin Swanström, Nils Wahlbom, Magda Holm | Comedy | Svärmor kommer | |
| The Österman Brothers' Virago | Thure Alfe | Carl Deurell, Artur Rolén, Solveig Hedengran | Comedy | Bröderna Östermans huskors | |
| Servant's Entrance | Gustaf Molander | Carl Barcklind, Tutta Rolf, Bengt Djurberg | Comedy | Vi som går köksvägen | |
| The Southsiders | Weyler Hildebrand | Gideon Wahlberg, Dagmar Ebbesen, Edvard Persson | Comedy | Söderkåkar | |
| A Stolen Waltz | Lorens Marmstedt | Ernst Eklund, Ragnar Falck, Aino Taube | Drama | En stulen vals | |
| The Storholmen Brothers | Sigurd Wallén | Fridolf Rhudin, Sigurd Wallén, Birgit Tengroth | Comedy | Pojkarna på Storholmen | |
| Students in Paris | Louis Mercanton | Meg Lemonnier, Henri Garat, Aino Taube | Musical | Studenter i Paris | Co-production with US |

== 1933 ==
| English Title | Director | Cast | Genre | Swedish Title | Notes |
|---|---|---|---|---|---|
| Augusta's Little Misstep | Thor Modéen | Edvard Persson, Dagmar Ebbesen, Aino Taube | Comedy | Augustas lilla felsteg | |
| Boman's Boy | Ivar Johansson | Bengt Djurberg, Birgit Tengroth, Sigurd Wallén | Comedy | Bomans pojke | |
| The Dangerous Game | Weyler Hildebrand | Edvard Persson, Ake Ohberg, Marianne Löfgren | Comedy | Den farliga leken | |
| Dear Relatives | Gustaf Molander | Gösta Ekman, Tutta Rolf, Carl Barcklind | Comedy | Kära släkten | |
| Fridolf in the Lion's Den | Weyler Hildebrand | Fridolf Rhudin, Aino Taube, Björn Berglund | Comedy | Fridolf i lejonkulan | |
| House Slaves | Ragnar Widestedt | Dagmar Ebbesen, Isa Quensel, Hasse Ekman | Comedy | Hemslavinnor | |
| Love and Dynamite | O.A.C. Lund | Valdemar Dalquist, Birgit Sergelius, Isa Quensel | Drama | Kärlek och dynamit | |
| Marriageable Daughters | Sigurd Wallén | Birgit Tengroth, Maritta Marke, Karin Ekelund | Comedy | Giftasvuxna döttrar | |
| People of Hälsingland | Ivar Johansson | Hilda Castegren, Sven Bergvall, Sten Lindgren | Drama | Hälsingar | |
| Perhaps a Poet | Lorens Marmstedt | Gösta Ekman, Gunnar Olsson, Karin Kavli | Drama | Kanske en diktare | |
| Saturday Nights | Schamyl Bauman | Edvard Persson, Dagmar Ebbesen, Gideon Wahlberg | Comedy | Lördagskvällar | |
| Secret Svensson | Schamyl Bauman | Fridolf Rhudin, Edvard Persson, Dagmar Ebbesen | Comedy | Hemliga Svensson | |
| Two Men and a Widow | John Lindlöf | Gösta Ekman, Gull-Maj Norin, Tollie Zellman | Comedy | Två man om en änka | |
| What Do Men Know? | Edvin Adolphson | Anders de Wahl, Birgit Tengroth, Håkan Westergren | Drama | Vad veta väl männen | |
| Wife for a Day | Gösta Rodin | Aina Rosén, Erik Berglund, Tollie Zellman | Comedy | Hustru för en dag | |

== 1934 ==
| English Title | Director | Cast | Genre | Swedish Title | Notes |
|---|---|---|---|---|---|
| Andersson's Kalle | Sigurd Wallén | Thor Modéen, Tollie Zellman, Naemi Briese | Comedy | Anderssonskans Kalle | |
| The Atlantic Adventure | Lorens Marmstedt, Edvin Adolphson | Birgit Tengroth, Valdemar Dalquist, Margit Manstad | Comedy | Atlantäventyret | |
| Eva Goes Aboard | Lorens Marmstedt | Einar Axelsson, Emy Hagman, Lili Ziedner | Comedy | Eva går ombord | |
| False Greta | John W. Brunius, Pauline Brunius | Adolf Jahr, Karin Albihn, Isa Quensel | Comedy | Falska Greta | Co-production with Finland |
| Fired | Ivar Johansson | Sture Lagerwall, Anne-Marie Brunius, Mathias Taube | Drama | Uppsagd | |
| Man's Way with Women | Per-Axel Branner | Edvin Adolphson, Inga Tidblad, Birgit Tengroth | Drama | Sången om den eldröda blomman | |
| Melody of the Sea | John W. Brunius | Carl Ström, Greta Almroth, Sigge Fürst | Drama | Havets melodi | |
| The Song to Her | Ivar Johansson | Sickan Carlsson, Åke Jensen, Greta Gynt | Comedy | Sången till henne | |
| Simon of Backabo | Gustaf Edgren | Fridolf Rhudin, Hilda Borgström, Sickan Carlsson | Comedy | Simon i Backabo | |
| Synnöve Solbakken | Tancred Ibsen | Karin Ekelund, Fritiof Billquist, Victor Sjöström | Drama | Synnöve Solbakken | |
| A Wedding Night at Stjarnehov | Torsten Lundqvist | Adolf Jahr, Elisabeth Frisk, Ruth Stevens | Comedy | En bröllopsnatt på Stjärnehov | |
| The Women Around Larsson | Schamyl Bauman | Edvard Persson, Gideon Wahlberg, Katie Rolfsen | Drama | Kvinnorna kring Larsson | |

== 1935 ==
| English Title | Director | Cast | Genre | Swedish Title | Notes |
|---|---|---|---|---|---|
| Adventure in Pyjamas | Ragnar Widestedt | Carl Barcklind, Signe Wirff, Anne-Marie Brunius | Comedy | Äventyr i pyjamas | |
| The Boys of Number Fifty Seven | Ivar Johansson | Julia Cæsar, Britta Brunius, Tord Bernheim | Comedy | Grabbarna i 57:an | |
| Close Relations | Sölve Cederstrand | Edvard Persson, Gideon Wahlberg, Dagmar Ebbesen | Comedy | Tjocka släkten | |
| The Count of the Old Town | Edvin Adolphson | Valdemar Dalquist, Julia Cæsar, Ingrid Bergman | Comedy | Munkbrogreven | |
| The Marriage Game | Ragnar Hyltén-Cavallius | Zarah Leander, Harry Roeck-Hansen, Einar Axelsson | Comedy | Äktenskapsleken | |
| Ocean Breakers | Ivar Johansson | Ingrid Bergman, Sten Lindgren, Tore Svennberg | Drama | Bränningar | |
| The People of Småland | Gösta Rodin | Sigurd Wallén, Sture Lagerwall, Sickan Carlsson | Comedy | Smålänningar | |
| Swedenhielms | Gustaf Molander | Gösta Ekman, Björn Berglund, Ingrid Bergman | Comedy | Swedenhielms | |
| Under False Flag | Gustaf Molander | Ernst Eklund, Tutta Rolf, Allan Bohlin | Comedy | Under falsk flagg | |
| Walpurgis Night | Gustaf Edgren | Lars Hanson, Karin Kavli, Ingrid Bergman | Drama | Valborgsmässoafton | |

== 1936 ==
| English Title | Director | Cast | Genre | Swedish Title | Notes |
|---|---|---|---|---|---|
| 65, 66 and I | Anders Henrikson | Thor Modéen, Carl Hagman, Katie Rolfsen | Comedy | 65, 66 and I | |
| Adventure | Per-Axel Branner | Karin Swanström, Tutta Rolf, Olof Winnerstrand | Drama | Äventyret | |
| Conscientious Objector Adolf | Sigurd Wallén | Adolf Jahr, Karin Albihn, Weyler Hildebrand | Comedy | Samvetsömma Adolf | |
| The Family Secret | Gustaf Molander | Olof Winnerstrand, Karin Swanström, Birgit Tengroth | Comedy | Familjens hemlighe | |
| The Ghost of Bragehus | Ragnar Arvedson, Tancred Ibsen | Adolf Jahr, Annalisa Ericson, Tollie Zellman | Comedy | Spöket på Bragehus | |
| The Girls of Uppakra | Lorens Marmstedt, Alice Eklund | Stina Hedberg, Isa Quensel, Lauritz Falk | Drama | Flickorna på Uppåkra | |
| He, She and the Money | Anders Henrikson | Håkan Westergren, Kirsten Heiberg, Maritta Marke | Comedy | Han, hon och pengarna | |
| Intermezzo | Gustaf Molander | Gösta Ekman, Inga Tidblad, Ingrid Bergman | Drama | Intermezzo | |
| It Pays to Advertise | Anders Henrikson | Thor Modéen, Håkan Westergren, Birgit Tengroth | Comedy | Annonsera! | |
| Johan Ulfstjerna | Gustaf Edgren | Gösta Ekman, Björn Berglund, Birgit Tengroth | Drama | Johan Ulfstjerna | |
| The Lady Becomes a Maid | Ivar Johansson | Hugo Björne, Olga Andersson, Marianne Löfgren | Comedy | Fröken blir piga | |
| On the Sunny Side | Gustaf Molander | Lars Hanson, Ingrid Bergman, Karin Swanström | Comedy | På solsidan | |
| Our Boy | Arne Bornebusch | Edvard Persson, Nils Wahlbom, Tollie Zellman | Comedy | Våran pojke | |
| Poor Millionaires | Ragnar Arvedson, Tancred Ibsen | Adolf Jahr, Anna Olin, Ernst Eklund | Comedy | Stackars miljonärer | |
| The Quartet That Split Up | Arne Bornebusch | Carl Barcklind, Birgit Rosengren, Aino Taube | Comedy | Kvartetten som sprängdes | |
| Raggen | Schamyl Bauman | Nils Wahlbom, Anna Olin, Isa Quensel | Comedy | Raggen - det är jag det | |
| Shipwrecked Max | Fritz Schulz, Sigurd Wallén | Max Hansen, Gull-Maj Norin, Brita Appelgren | Drama | Skeppsbrutne Max | Co-production with Austria |
| South of the Highway | Gideon Wahlberg | Edvard Persson, Fritiof Billquist, Mim Persson | Comedy | Söder om landsvägen | |
| Unfriendly Relations | Anders Henrikson | Håkan Westergren, Karin Swanström, Gull-Maj Norin | Comedy | Släkten är värst | |
| The Wedding Trip | Gustaf Molander | Håkan Westergren, Anne-Marie Brunius, Karin Swanström | Comedy | Bröllopsresan | |

== 1937 ==
| English Title | Director | Cast | Genre | Swedish Title | Notes |
|---|---|---|---|---|---|
| Adolf Strongarm | Sigurd Wallén | Adolf Jahr, Weyler Hildebrand, Georg Rydeberg | Comedy | Adolf Armstarke | |
| The Andersson Family | Sigurd Wallén | Sigurd Wallén, Elsa Carlsson, Inga-Bodil Vetterlund | Comedy | Familjen Andersson | |
| Conflict | Per-Axel Branner | Lars Hanson, Sigurd Wallén, Aino Taube | Drama | Konflikt | |
| Happy Vestköping | Ragnar Arvedson | Isa Quensel, Einar Axelsson, Nils Wahlbom | Comedy | Lyckliga Vestköping | |
| Hotel Paradise | Weyler Hildebrand | Thor Modéen, Maritta Marke, Nils Ericson | Comedy | Pensionat Paradiset | |
| John Ericsson, Victor of Hampton Roads | Gustaf Edgren | Victor Sjöström, Märta Ekström, Anders Henrikson | Historical | John Ericsson - segraren vid Hampton Roads | |
| Mother Gets Married | Ivar Johansson | Carl Barcklind, Margit Manstad, Annalisa Ericson | Comedy | Mamma gifter sig | |
| Oh, Such a Night! | Anders Henrikson | Sickan Carlsson, Birgit Tengroth, Kirsten Heiberg | Comedy | O, en så'n natt! | |
| The Pale Count | Gösta Rodin | Carl Schenstrøm, Harald Madsen, Anna Olin | Comedy | Bleka greven | |
| The People of Bergslagen | Gunnar Olsson | Karin Ekelund, Sten Lindgren, Arnold Sjöstrand | Drama | Bergslagsfolk | |
| Russian Flu | Gustaf Edgren | Ake Soderblom, Kirsten Heiberg, Edvin Adolphson | Comedy | Ryska snuvan | |
| Sara Learns Manners | Gustaf Molander | Tutta Rolf, Emma Meissner, Aino Taube | Comedy | Sara lär sig folkvett | |
| Witches' Night | Schamyl Bauman | Gösta Ekman, Signe Hasso, Ruth Stevens | Drama | Häxnatten | |

== 1938 ==
| English Title | Director | Cast | Genre | Swedish Title | Notes |
|---|---|---|---|---|---|
| Adolf Saves the Day | Adolf Jahr | Adolf Jahr, Artur Cederborgh, Eleonor de Floer | Comedy | Adolf klarar skivan | |
| Art for Art's Sake | Gunnar Skoglund | Jussi Björling, Åke Ohberg, Anders Henrikson | Comedy | Fram för framgång | |
| Baldwin's Wedding | Gideon Wahlberg | Edvard Persson, Bullan Weijden, Dagmar Ebbesen | Comedy | Baldevins bröllop | |
| Career | Schamyl Bauman | Signe Hasso, Sture Lagerwall, Tollie Zellman | Drama | Karriär | |
| Comrades in Uniform | Schamyl Bauman | Gösta Cederlund, Fritiof Billquist, Sigge Fürst | Comedy | Kamrater i vapenrocken | |
| A Cruise in the Albertina | Per-Axel Branner | Adolf Jahr, Signe Wirff, Olav Riégo | Drama | På kryss med Albertina | |
| Dollar | Gustaf Molander | Ingrid Bergman, Georg Rydeberg, Tutta Rolf | Comedy | Dollar | |
| For Better, for Worse | Ivar Johansson | Sten Lindgren, Mona Mårtenson, Rolf Botvid | Drama | I nöd och lust | |
| Good Friends and Faithful Neighbours | Weyler Hildebrand | Ludde Gentzel, Greta Almroth, Eric Abrahamsson | Comedy | Goda vänner och trogna grannar | |
| The Great Love | Anders Henrikson | Tutta Rolf, Håkan Westergren, Karin Swanström | Comedy | Den stora kärleken | |
| Just a Bugler | Anders Henrikson | Adolf Jahr, Elof Ahrle, Sickan Carlsson | Comedy | Bara en trumpetare | |
| Storm Over the Skerries | Ivar Johansson | Sten Lindgren, Karin Ekelund, Björn Berglund | Drama | Storm över skären | |
| Sun Over Sweden | Arne Bornebusch | Nils Lundell, Rut Holm, Inga-Bodil Vetterlund | Comedy | Sol över Sverige | |
| Thunder and Lightning | Anders Henrikson | Olof Winnerstrand, Nils Wahlbom, Marianne Aminoff | Comedy | Blixt och dunder | |
| A Woman's Face | Gustaf Molander | Ingrid Bergman, Tore Svennberg, Anders Henrikson | Drama | En kvinnas ansikte | |

== 1939 ==
| English Title | Director | Cast | Genre | Swedish Title | Notes |
|---|---|---|---|---|---|
| Between Us Barons | Ivar Johansson | Adolf Jahr, Birgit Tengroth, Gösta Cederlund | Comedy | Oss baroner emellan | |
| Circus | George Schnéevoigt | Carl Ström, Gösta Cederlund, Tollie Zellman | Drama | Cirkus | Co-production with Denmark |
| Emilie Högquist | Gustaf Molander | Georg Rydeberg, Signe Hasso, Anna Lindahl | Historical | Emilie Högquist | |
| Her Little Majesty | Schamyl Bauman | Joachim Holst-Jensen, Sonja Wigert, Anders Henrikson | Comedy | Hennes lilla majestät | |
| Kalle's Inn | Emil A. Lingheim | Edvard Persson, Bullan Weijden, John Degerberg | Comedy | Kalle på Spången | |
| Life Begins Today | Schamyl Bauman | Sture Lagerwall, Sonja Wigert, Nils Ohlin | Drama | I dag börjar livet | |
| Nothing But the Truth | Weyler Hildebrand | Erik Berglund, Tollie Zellman, Sickan Carlsson | Comedy | Rena rama sanningen | |
| Oh, What a Boy! | Ivar Johansson | Elof Ahrle, Sickan Carlsson, Gösta Cederlund | Comedy | Åh, en så'n grabb | |
| Only One Night | Gustaf Molander | Ingrid Bergman, Edvin Adolphson, Aino Taube | Drama | En enda Natt | |
| The People of Högbogården | Arne Weel | John Ekman, Linnéa Hillberg, Annalisa Ericson | Drama | Folket på Högbogården | |
| The Two of Us | Schamyl Bauman | Sture Lagerwall, Signe Hasso, Stig Järrel | Drama | Vi två | |
| Variety Is the Spice of Life | Gustaf Molander | Tutta Rolf, Per Aabel, Elsa Burnett | Comedy | Ombyte förnöjer | |
| Wanted | Schamyl Bauman | Edvin Adolphson, Birgit Rosengren, Elof Ahrle | Drama | Efterlyst | |
| We at Solglantan | Gunnar Olsson | Dagmar Ebbesen, Rut Holm, Nils Lundell | Comedy | Vi på Solgläntan | |
| Whalers | Anders Henrikson, Tancred Ibsen | Allan Bohlin, Tutta Rolf, Oscar Egede-Nissen | Drama | Valfångare | |
