= Andersson's Kalle =

Andersson's Kalle (Swedish: Anderssonskans Kalle) may refer to:

- Andersson's Kalle, a 1901 novel by Emil Norlander
- Andersson's Kalle (1922 film), a silent Swedish film directed by Sigurd Wallén
- New Pranks of Andersson's Kalle, a 1923 silent Swedish film directed by Sigurd Wallén
- Andersson's Kalle (1934 film), a Swedish film directed by Sigurd Wallén
- Andersson's Kalle (1950 film), a Swedish film directed by Rolf Husberg
- Andersson's Kalle (1972 film), a Swedish film directed by Arne Stivell
- Andersson's Kalle on Top Form, a 1973 Swedish film directed by Arne Stivell
