= Artificial Svensson =

1929 film

- Directed by: Gustaf Edgren
- Written by: Sölve Cederstrand; Gustaf Edgren
- Produced by: Vilhelm Bryde
- Starring: Fridolf Rhudin; Brita Appelgren; Weyler Hildebrand
- Cinematography: Hugo Edlund
- Production company: Svensk Filmindustri
- Distributed by: Svensk Filmindustri
- Release date: 14 October 1929
- Running time: 81 minutes
- Country: Sweden
- Languages: Silent; Swedish intertitles

Artificial Svensson (Swedish: Konstgjorda Svensson) is a 1929 Swedish silent comedy film directed by Gustaf Edgren and starring Fridolf Rhudin, Brita Appelgren and Weyler Hildebrand. It was shot at the Råsunda Studios in Stockholm. The film's sets were designed by the art director Vilhelm Bryde.

== Cast ==
- Fridolf Rhudin as Fridolf Ambrosius Svensson
- Brita Appelgren as Mary Lantz
- Weyler Hildebrand as Sgt.Mayor Göransson
- Karin Gillberg as Mary Björklund
- Sven Garbo as Harald Smith
- Georg Blomstedt as Col. Björklund
- Tor Borong as Col. Claes Gyllenbage
- Ernst Brunman as Doctor
- Einar Fagstad as Conscript
- Richard Lund as Lieutenant
- Olof Ås as Officer
- Alf Östlund as Private
- Bertil Ehrenmark as Soldat
- Louise Eneman-Wahlberg as Frun som blir skrämd
- Olle Hilding as Soldat
- Carlo Hultman as Soldat utanför läkarmottagningen
- Maja Jerlström as Hembiträdet
- Robert Jonsson as Inskrivningsofficer
- Ludde Juberg as Sjukvårdare
- Eric Malmberg as Inskrivningsofficer
- Greta Strömberg as Dansande på restaurangen
- Maya Strömberg as Dansande på restaurangen
- Åke Uppström as Soldat på marketenteriet
- John Wahlbom as Soldat på marketenteriet
- Harald Wehlnor as Underofficer
- Ruth Weijden as Smiths hembiträde

== Bibliography ==
- Gustafsson, Tommy. Masculinity in the Golden Age of Swedish Cinema: A Cultural Analysis of 1920s Films. McFarland, 2014.
