= Black Rudolf =

1928 film

- Directed by: Gustaf Edgren
- Written by: Sölve Cederstrand; Gustaf Edgren
- Starring: Fridolf Rhudin; Inga Tidblad; John Ekman
- Cinematography: Adrian Bjurman
- Edited by: Adrian Bjurman
- Production company: Svensk Filmindustri
- Distributed by: Svensk Filmindustri
- Release date: 22 October 1928
- Running time: 70 minutes
- Country: Sweden
- Languages: Silent; Swedish intertitles

Black Rudolf (Swedish: Svarte Rudolf) is a 1928 Swedish drama film directed by Gustaf Edgren and starring Fridolf Rhudin, Inga Tidblad and John Ekman. It was shot at the Råsunda Studios in Stockholm. The film's sets were designed by the art director Vilhelm Bryde.

The film was premiered on 22 October 1928 and was shot in the Filmstaden Råsunda with exteriors from Dalarö, Drottningholm Palace Park, Roslagsbanan, Munsö in Mälaren and the waters off the Huvudskär lighthouse in the Stockholm archipelago by Adrian Bjurman.

== Cast ==
- Fridolf Rhudin as Rudolf Carlsson
- Inga Tidblad as Nancy von Rosen
- John Ekman as Baransky
- Weyler Hildebrand as Franz Schultze
- Carl-Gustaf Berg as Per-Olof Sjöberg
- Linnea Spångberg as Inga Österman
- Signhild Björkman as Waitress
- Tor Borong as Customs Officer
- Birgit Chenon as Actress
- Karen Christensen as Kissing Scene Actress
- Lola Grahl as Ritzo-Rita
- Nalle Haldén as Department Store Manager
- Karl Jonsson as Cinematographer
- Ludde Juberg as Actor
- Herman Lantz as Bootlegger
- Katie Rolfsen as Beda Johansson
- Gunnar Skoglund as Actor
- Wilhelm Tunelli as Johan Österman

== Bibliography ==
- Gustafsson, Tommy. Masculinity in the Golden Age of Swedish Cinema: A Cultural Analysis of 1920s Films. McFarland, 2014.
