= Anderberg =

Anderberg is a Swedish surname. Notable people with the surname include:

- Axel Anderberg (1860–1937), Swedish architect
- Bengt Anderberg (1920–2008), Swedish writer
- Bertil Anderberg (1913–1991), Swedish film actor
- Erik Anderberg (1892–1990), Swedish Navy vice admiral
- Gylfe Anderberg (1878–1946), Swedish diplomat
- Olle Anderberg (1919–2003), Swedish sport wrestler
