= Stellan Claësson =

Swedish actor (1886–1970)

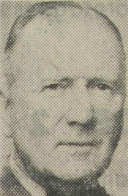
- Born: Erik Stellan Claësson; March 31, 1886; Söderhamn, Sweden
- Died: June 2, 1970 (aged 84); Stockholm, Sweden
- Occupation: Producer
- Spouse(s): Karin Swanström (1915-1942); Signe Liberg (b. 1949-1969)

Erik Stellan Claësson was a Swedish film producer. He was married to actress Karin Swanstrom and ran SF Studios for over a decade. He was responsible for first sighting Ingrid Bergman and introducing her to cinema.

== Biography ==
Claësson was the son of city physician Jonas Leonhard Claësson and Aurora Adelaide Hillman. He came to Stockholm where he first worked in the police force but then went into acting.

Claësson was appointed studio manager for SF Studios in Råsunda, Solna, in 1932. In his book Scandinavian Film, Forsyth Hardy writes of this period of the studio's history that "Svensk Filmindustri, through its producers Karin Swanstrom and Stellan Claesson, was content to produce modestly conceived films for the home market. They were for the most part comedies with a strong theatrical flavour or farces, some of them originating strangely in the novels of P. G. Wodehouse." During his time there, Claësson was nicknamed by some colleagues "Råsunda's dictator" for his autocratic manner. He was the production manager for 110 films between 1923 and 1948.

Stellan Claësson was first married to the actress Karin Swanström (1873-1942), from 1915 until her death; they managed SF Studios together and were sometimes called the "King and Queen in Filmstaden". In 1949, after her death, he married Signe Maria Elisabet Liberg (1896-1969). Claësson is buried at the northern cemetery in Stockholm together with his wife.

== Selected filmography ==
=== Producer ===
- House Slaves (1923)
- The Nurtull Gang (1923)
- Anna-Clara and Her Brothers (1923)
- Kalle Utter (1925)
- The False Millionaire (1931)
- Skipper's Love (1931)
- Ship Ahoy! (1931)
- The Storholmen Brothers (1932)
- International Match (1932)
- Dear Relatives (1933)
- Boman's Boy (1933)
- Augusta's Little Misstep (1933)
- Two Men and a Widow (1933)
- What Do Men Know? (1933)
- Marriageable Daughters (1933)
- The Song to Her (1934)
- Andersson's Kalle (1934)
- Simon of Backabo (1934)
- Swedenhielms (1935)
- Walpurgis Night (1935)
- It Pays to Advertise (1936)
- Conscientious Objector Adolf (1936)
- The Wedding Trip (1936)
- Johan Ulfstjerna (1936)
- Sara Learns Manners (1937)
- John Ericsson, Victor of Hampton Roads (1937)
- Conflict (1937)
- Art for Art's Sake (1938)
- Good Friends and Faithful Neighbours (1938)
- Whalers (1939)
- Oh, What a Boy! (1939)
- Only one night (1939)
- If I Could Marry the Minister (1941)
- Tomorrow's Melody (1942)
- Doctor Glas (1942)
- The Serious Game (1945)
- The Sixth Commandment (1947)
- Loffe the Tramp (1948)

=== Actor ===
- 1925 - First Mate Karlsson's Sweethearts (in the role of Benley)
