= The Storholmen Brothers =

1932 film

Pojkarna på Storholmen
- Official movie poster of 1932
- Directed by: Sigurd Wallén
- Written by: Ivar Johansson; Sigurd Wallén
- Produced by: Stellan Claësson; Film AB Minerva
- Starring: Fridolf Rhudin; Sigurd Wallén; Emmy Albiin; Bengt Djurberg; Sture Lagerwall; Anna Olin; Birgit Tengroth; Margit Manstad
- Cinematography: Elner Åkesson
- Edited by: Rolf Husberg
- Music by: Fred Winter
- Distributed by: Svensk Filmindustri
- Release date: 31 October 1932
- Running time: 93 minutes
- Country: Sweden
- Language: Swedish

The Storholmen Brothers (Swedish: Pojkarna på Storholmen) is a 1932 Swedish black-and-white comedy film. It was directed by and starred Sigurd Wallén and Fridolf Rhudin, two of the big names of Swedish film in the early 20th century. Pojkarna på Storholmen is one of the greatest box office hits in the history of the leading Swedish film studio Svensk Filmindustri, and generally regarded as one of the best Fridolf Rhudin comedies.

== Plot ==
The Sjölund family at Lillholmen Island in the Stockholm archipelago is quite religious and has therefore been regarded as a suitable place for the care of "odd young people adrift" who are to be placed there by the "Municipal Protection Society for Young Girls". One day, the fashionable Sonja Waller, a woman with a "questionable reputation", is expected at the island and the Sjölunds are waiting anxiously. Unfortunately, the young handsome Gunnar Andersson of the neighboring Storholmen Island has been sent to get her at a local steamboat bridge. Sonja, who is a pretty girl, immediately makes a great impression on Gunnar, who soon forgets that he is actually engaged to Aina, Sjölund's daughter. As Gunnar wants to show off for the new guest, the boat trip back to the Lillholmen is delayed for more than an hour. Back at the Storholmen Island, the general mood gets tense as all the locals are anxious to have a glimpse of the woman from the big city. After a short while, Ivar (Gunnar's brother) and Sixten (his cousin), along with the farmhand Snor-August, take off to the Lillholmen under false pretences. This angers Aina who herself maintains that she is actually engaged to Sixten, the heir of half the islet. Sixten is, for the solemn occasion, dressed in a seaman's sweater with the text "Waxholm I" (a famous archipelago steamer) across the chess. When Sonja arrives at the Lillholmen, Aina is horrified to discover that Gunnar and Sixten are almost obsessed by the new woman.

After having a look at her new home, Sonja takes off to the Storholmen to use the only phone available at the two islands. There, one of her friends back in Stockholm incidentally calls her. Sonja tells her about her new home and that the people there are really funny, and she jokes that the young men are particularly handsome. The friend gets interested and invites the brothers to Stockholm (a place where they have never been before), and the brothers take off to the city to see her at a nightclub. The young men are dressed in their black Sunday suits, and arriving in Stockholm, they have a drink at a bar where Sixten encounters a bald man (a classic scene where Sixten thinks that he should pull the poor man's hair). At the nightclub they meet with Sonja's friends, and they are quickly lost in the latest "Apache Dance". In quite a dizzy mood, the boys finally return to the Storholmen, where Sonja Waller has eventually reconciled with Aina – who now gets her Gunnar back. Moments later, Ivar proposes to Sonja, telling her that it doesn't matter that she is a woman with a "questionable background", and besides, there are "very few handsome women" in the archipelago anyway.

== Cast ==
- Fridolf Rhudin as Sixten Andersson, nicknamed "Waxholm Ettan"
- Sigurd Wallén as August Sjölund of Lillholmen
- Emmy Albiin as Kristin Sjölund (August's wife)
- Birgit Tengroth as Aina Sjölund (their daughter)
- Anna Olin as Mrs. Andersson (widow of Storholmen)
- Sture Lagerwall as Ivar Andersson (the widow's son and Sixten's cousin)
- Bengt Djurberg as Gunnar Andersson (Ivar's brother)
- Margit Manstad as Sonja Waller (nicknamed "balettråtta")
- Maja Cederborgh as Amalia, (maid at Storholmen, nicknamed "Waxholm Tvåan")
- Ruth Stevens as Ester (Sonja's friend)
- Einar Fagstad as Snor-August (farmhand at Lillholmen)
- Göran Bratt as Kalle (junior farmhand at Lillholmen)
- Gösta Ericsson as Ester's acquaintance at the nightclub
- Bengt-Olof Granberg as Ester's acquaintance at the nightclub
- Disa Gillis as Ester's friend at the nightclub

== Production ==
The film opened on 31 October 1932, at the Skandia movie theatre in Stockholm and became an instant success, and was running at movie theatres on a regular basis for almost 40 years. It was filmed at the Filmstaden Studios north of Stockholm, with some exterior scenes filmed at various locations in the Stockholm archipelago. The film is based on the play Pojkarna på Storholmen – Waxholm 1:an, which originally opened on 9 October 1914, at the Folkteatern theatre in Stockholm. A later version, opened on 3 May 1928, at the Mosebacke Theatre in Stockholm. In this version, Fridolf Rhudin acted as Sixten, originally a supporting-role character, which in the final movie became the lead character, tailor-made for Rhudin.

== Themes ==
An important theme is the strong religiosity of the locals in the archipelago, a backwater which stands in sharp contrast to the big city next door. Sixten has a continuous habit to say "Peace!" (Frid!) throughout the dialog, and that is, along with Fred Winter's cheerful song Waxholm Ettan, very much the trademark of the film.

== Music ==
- Waxholm Ettan, by Fred Winter and Einar Fagstad, lyrics by Sölve Cederstrand, performed by Sigurd Wallén and Fridolf Rhudin, played on the accordion by Einar Fagstad
- Kungliga Livgrenadjärregementets marsch, by Sam Rydberg (instrumental).
- Kärleksdrömmar, by Fred Winter, lyrics by Fritz Gustaf, performed by Gösta Kjellertz
- Flickan hon dansar, by Fred Winter, lyrics by Ritz Gustaf, performed by Lasse Dahlqvist synchronizing Sture Lagerwall, played on the accordion by Einar Fagstad
- Eksta-Valsen, by Arthur Hedström (instrumental).
- Frykdalsdans nr 2 (Dansen den går på grönan äng), by Ernst Willners and Tord Wetterberg (instrumental).
