= John Ericsson, Victor of Hampton Roads =

1937 film

- Directed by: Gustaf Edgren
- Written by: Oscar Rydqvist; Gustaf Edgren
- Produced by: Stellan Claësson
- Starring: Victor Sjöström; Märta Ekström; Anders Henrikson
- Cinematography: Åke Dahlqvist
- Edited by: Edvin Hammarberg
- Music by: Eric Bengtson
- Production company: Svensk Filmindustri
- Distributed by: Svensk Filmindustri
- Release date: 13 December 1937
- Running time: 92 minutes
- Country: Sweden
- Language: Swedish

John Ericsson, Victor of Hampton Roads (Swedish: John Ericsson – segraren vid Hampton Roads) is a 1937 Swedish historical drama film directed by Gustaf Edgren and starring Victor Sjöström, Märta Ekström and Anders Henrikson. It is a biographical film of the nineteenth century Swedish engineer and inventor John Ericsson, known for his work in Britain and the United States. The title refers to the 1862 Battle of Hampton Roads in the American Civil War, which featured the warship USS Monitor designed by Ericsson.

It was shot at the Råsunda Studios in Stockholm. The film's sets were designed by the art director Arne Åkermark. It was produced and distributed by Svensk Filmindustri.

== Cast ==
- Victor Sjöström as John Ericsson
- Märta Ekström as Amelia Ericsson
- Anders Henrikson as Taylor
- Sigurd Wallén as Karl 'Charlie' Petterson
- Kotti Chave as James Kerrigan
- Hilda Borgström as Ann Cassidy
- Carl Barcklind as Stephen Mallory
- Marianne Aminoff as Mary
- Ivar Kåge as Harry Delameter
- Olof Winnerstrand as Smith
- Richard Lund as Paulding
- Erik Rosén as Davis
- Helga Görlin as Jenny Lind
- Edvin Adolphson as Sanders
- Jussi Björling as Singer
- Knut Frankman as Seaman
- Gunnar Sjöberg as Seaman
- Carl Ström as Chief Guard
- Eric Abrahamsson as Clerk at the Navy Department
- Greta Almroth as Amelia's friend in England
- Carl August Andersson as First mate on 'Minnesota'
- Bror Berger as Unemployed
- Olle Björklund as Lieutenant on 'Merrimac'
- Gösta Bodin as Phineas Taylor Barnum, Jenny Lind's agent
- Carl Deurell as Foreman
- Bengt Djurberg as Lieutenant on 'Monitor'
- John Ericsson as Abraham Lincoln, president of the US
- August Falck as Sailor
- George Fant as Lieutenant on 'Monitor'
- Georg Fernqvist as Officer
- Emil Fjellström as Worker
- Gösta Grip as Confederate Minister
- Wictor Hagman as Sailor
- Hester Harvey as Black girl
- Folke Helleberg as Officer
- John Hilke as Jefferson Davis, president of the Confederacy
- Torsten Hillberg as Judge
- Anders Holmgren as Train driver
- Helge Karlsson as Soldier on 'Monitor'
- Helge Kihlberg as Young man at the station
- Alf Kjellin as Young man on Delamater's office
- Axel Lagerberg as Member of the Marine Committee
- Herman Lantz as Young man waiting for the Cunard Ferry
- Axel Lindberg as Lincoln's secretary
- Richard Lindström as Chairman of the Marine Committee
- Walter Lindström as Member of the Marine Committee
- Gösta Lycke as Commander on 'Minnesota'
- Helge Mauritz as Singer
- Nils Nordståhl as Commander on 'Cumberland'
- Yngve Nyqvist as General Robert E. Lee
- Gabriel Rosén as Confederate Chief of Guards
- Robert Ryberg as Draft officer
- Ingeborg Strandin as Worried mother
- Eric von Gegerfelt as Confederate minister
- James Westheimer as Sailor
- John Westin as Member of Congress
- Charles White as Jim, negro
- Oscar Åberg as Manager of the Confederate Shipyard

== See also ==
- List of films and television shows about the American Civil War

== Bibliography ==
- McIlroy, Brian. World Cinema: Sweden. Flicks Books, 1986.
- Qvist, Per Olov & von Bagh, Peter. Guide to the Cinema of Sweden and Finland. Greenwood Publishing Group, 2000.
- Wallengren, Ann-Kristin. Welcome Home Mr Swanson: Swedish Emigrants and Swedishness on Film. Nordic Academic Press, 2014.
