= Good Friends and Faithful Neighbours =

Good Friends and Faithful Neighbours may refer to:

- Good Friends and Faithful Neighbours (1938 film), Swedish film
- Good Friends and Faithful Neighbours (1960 film), Swedish film
