= Ship Ahoy! (film) =

1931 film

- Directed by: Gustaf Edgren
- Written by: Sölve Cederstrand; Gustaf Edgren
- Produced by: Stellan Claësson
- Starring: Fridolf Rhudin; Weyler Hildebrand; Brita Appelgren
- Cinematography: Martin Bodin; Elner Åkesson
- Music by: Jules Sylvain
- Production company: Minerva Film AB
- Distributed by: Svensk Filmindustri
- Release date: 26 December 1931
- Running time: 82 minutes
- Country: Sweden
- Language: Swedish

Ship Ahoy! (Swedish: Skepp ohoj!) is a 1931 Swedish comedy film co-written and directed by Gustaf Edgren and starring Fridolf Rhudin, Weyler Hildebrand and Brita Appelgren. It was shot at the Råsunda Studios in Stockholm and on location in Gothenburg. The film's sets were designed by the art director Arne Åkermark.

== Cast ==
- Fridolf Rhudin as Fridolf Svensson
- Weyler Hildebrand as Julius Göransson
- Brita Appelgren as Mary
- Edvin Adolphson as Alvarado de Gotho
- Georg Blomstedt as Lövgren, Karlshamn's chief of police
- Erik Bergman as Captain on 'Ingeborg'
- Wilhelm Högstedt as Captain on 'Fritiof'
- Yngve Nyqvist as Detective
- Nils Ekstam as Detective
- Carl Andersson as Man
- Helge Andersson as Man
- Anna-Lisa Berg as Girl selling chocolate
- Gunnar Björnstrand as Young man
- Rulle Bohman as Rulle, sailor
- Berns De Reaux as Black man
- Bertil Ehrenmark as Sailor on 'Ingeborg'
- Göran Eklund as Sailor on 'Ingeborg'
- Einar Fagstad as Rikard, sailor
- Emil Fjellström as Guest at Restaurant
- Ludde Gentzel as Sailor on 'Ingeborg'
- Eric Gustafson as Tied and burgled man
- Paul Hagman as Man
- Frithiof Hedvall as Constable Bäsk
- Olle Hilding as Waitor
- Maja Jerlström as Girl
- Ludde Juberg as Jimmy, black man
- Bo Korfitzen as Bartender
- Olof Krook as Man in the bar
- Herman Lantz as Guest on Restaurant Grand Fall
- Helge Mauritz as Steward on 'Fritiof'
- John Melin as Bartender
- Thor Modéen as Editor
- Doris Nelson as Rosita
- Nils Nordståhl as Young man
- Rutger Nygren as Young man
- Dagny Ohlson as Girl
- Werner Ohlson as Police trainee
- Olav Riégo as Ljungborg, editor
- Oscar Rosander as Man
- Aina Rosén as Betty
- Svea Svensson as Girl
- John Wahlbom as Man in the bar
- Edith Wallén as Mary's mother
- Birgit Widerbäck as Girl
- Lisa Wirström as Woman

== Bibliography ==
- Qvist, Per Olov & von Bagh, Peter. Guide to the Cinema of Sweden and Finland. Greenwood Publishing Group, 2000.
