= Goransson's Boy =

1941 film

- Directed by: Weyler Hildebrand
- Written by: Weyler Hildebrand; Torsten Lundqvist
- Produced by: Tor Borong
- Starring: Weyler Hildebrand; Eric Abrahamsson; Hilda Borgström; Emy Hagman
- Cinematography: Julius Jaenzon
- Edited by: Oscar Rosander
- Music by: Lasse Dahlquist; Gunnar Johansson; Jules Sylvain
- Production company: Fribergs Filmbyrå
- Distributed by: Fribergs Filmbyrå
- Release date: 22 September 1941
- Running time: 88 minutes
- Country: Sweden
- Language: Swedish

Goransson's Boy (Swedish: Göranssons pojke) is a 1941 Swedish drama film co-written and directed by and starring Weyler Hildebrand and also featuring Eric Abrahamsson, Hilda Borgström and Emy Hagman. It was shot at the Råsunda Studios in Stockholm. The film's sets were designed by the art director Arne Åkermark.

== Cast ==
- Weyler Hildebrand as Julius Göransson
- Tom Olsson as Pelle
- Eric Abrahamsson as Sudden
- Hilda Borgström as Aunt Brink
- Gaby Stenberg as Karin Brodin
- Emy Hagman as Anna Fagerlund
- Sigge Fürst as Skrot-Johan
- Magnus Kesster as Snobben
- Kotti Chave as Balalajka
- Carl Ström as Prison Chaplain
- Gunnar Sjöberg as Göran Bryhme, Pelle's father
- Elsa Ebbesen as Göransson's mother
- Wiktor Andersson as MC at the boxing
- Douglas Håge as Foreman
- John Elfström as Policeman interrogating Göransson
- Carl Ericson as Street sweeper
- Arthur Fischer as Wholesaler
- Helge Kihlberg as Prisoner
- Ivar Wahlgren as Policeman
- Aurore Palmgren as Quarreling woman
- Stig Olin as Young man at Norr Mälarstrand
- Christian Bratt as Young man at Norr Mälarstrand
- John Norrman as Old man at the Bachelor's Hotel
- Anders Frithiof as Warden at the prison

== Bibliography ==
- Holmstrom, John. The Moving Picture Boy: An International Encyclopaedia from 1895 to 1995. Michael Russell, 1996.
