= Adolf Strongarm =

1937 film directed by Sigurd Wallén

- Directed by: Sigurd Wallén
- Written by: Weyler Hildebrand; Torsten Lundqvist
- Produced by: Harry Malmstedt
- Starring: Adolf Jahr; Weyler Hildebrand; Georg Rydeberg
- Cinematography: Martin Bodin
- Edited by: Rolf Husberg
- Music by: Fred Winter
- Production company: Svensk Talfilm
- Distributed by: Svensk Talfilm
- Release date: 15 March 1937
- Running time: 87 minutes
- Country: Sweden
- Language: Swedish

Adolf Strongarm or Adolf Armstrong (Swedish: Adolf Armstarke) is a 1937 Swedish historical comedy film directed by Sigurd Wallén and starring Adolf Jahr, Weyler Hildebrand and Georg Rydeberg. It was shot at the Råsunda Studios in Stockholm. The film's sets were designed by the art director Allan Egnell.

== Synopsis ==
A mild-mannered Swedish university professor dreams that he has been transported back to the Middle Ages and is a noble knight fighting villains and wooing a beautiful lady.

== Cast ==
- Adolf Jahr as Adolf Turesson / Adolf Armstarke of Thureholm
- Weyler Hildebrand as Göran Göransson / Göran Göransson Tre Stånkor
- Georg Rydeberg as Georg Ankarhjelm / Knight Georg of Ankarshus
- Theodor Berthels as Wholesaler Larsson / Merchant Larsonius
- Alice Skoglund as Britta Larsson / Birgitta Larsonius
- Kate Thunman as Eufemia Larsson / Eufemia Larsonius
- James Westheimer as Olof Olsson / Pater Olaus
- Ludde Juberg as Professor / Antonius
- Olle Hilding as Henriksson / Henrik Mjölnare
- Stina Ståhle as Lena / Magdalena
- Eivor Engelbrektsson as Karin, waitress / Maid
- Richard Lund as Enögde galten / Knight Kristoffer
- Sigge Fürst as Christianity Teacher / Bandit leader
- Emil Fjellström as Folke Niklasson / Niklas Skäggfager
- Signhild Björkman as Maid
- Artur Cederborgh as Inn keeper
- Eddie Figge as Member of the audience at the lecture
- Carl Harald as Bandit
- John Hilke as Knight at Ankarshus
- Olle Jansson as Knight at Ankarshus
- Herman Lantz as Guest at Den Gyldene Freden / Bandit
- Sven Löfgren as Bandit
- Rutger Nygren as Member of the audience at the lecture
- Yngve Nyqvist as Member of the audience at the lecture
- Nils Poppe as Skogens Konung
- Manetta Ryberg as Lena's friend at Den Gyldene Freden
- Robert Ryberg as Guest at Den Gyldene Freden
- Stina Seelig as Woman
- Georg Skarstedt as Jester
- Harald Svensson as Board member
- Nils Wahlbom as Guest at Den Gyldene Freden / Bandit
- Tor Wallén as Knight at Ankarshus
- Harald Wehlnor as Man
- Ragnar Widestedt as Board member

== Bibliography ==
- Larsson, Mariah; Marklund, Anders (2010). Swedish Film: An Introduction and Reader. Nordic Academic Press.
