= The Suitor from the Highway =

1923 film

- Directed by: Sigurd Wallén
- Written by: Sam Ask; Sigurd Wallén
- Starring: Edvin Adolphson; Jenny Hasselqvist; Gösta Alexandersson
- Cinematography: Henrik Jaenzon
- Edited by: Sigurd Wallén
- Production company: Bewefilm
- Distributed by: Wahlströms Filmbyrå
- Release date: 1 October 1923
- Running time: 74 minutes
- Country: Sweden
- Languages: Silent; Swedish intertitles

The Suitor from the Highway (Swedish: Friaren från landsvägen) is a 1923 Swedish silent drama film directed by Sigurd Wallén and starring Edvin Adolphson, Jenny Hasselqvist and Gösta Alexandersson.

== Cast ==
- Edvin Adolphson as Sten Selling
- Jenny Hasselqvist as Astrid Löwen
- Gösta Alexandersson as Gösta Lind
- Vilhelm Bryde as Binge
- Sigurd Wallén as Vagel
- John Ekman as Jonas Råsten

== Bibliography ==
- Qvist, Per Olov & von Bagh, Peter. Guide to the Cinema of Sweden and Finland. Greenwood Publishing Group, 2000.
