= Oh, What a Boy! =

1939 film

- Directed by: Ivar Johansson
- Written by: Erik Asklund; Gösta Rodin
- Produced by: Stellan Claësson
- Starring: Elof Ahrle; Sickan Carlsson; Gösta Cederlund
- Cinematography: Elner Åkesson
- Edited by: Tage Holmberg
- Music by: Sune Waldimir
- Production company: Wivefilm
- Distributed by: Wivefilm
- Release date: 25 October 1939
- Running time: 82 minutes
- Country: Sweden
- Language: Swedish

Oh, What a Boy! (Swedish: Åh, en så'n grabb) is a 1939 Swedish musical comedy film directed by Ivar Johansson and starring Elof Ahrle, Sickan Carlsson and Gösta Cederlund. It was shot at the Råsunda Studios in Stockholm and on location in the city. The film's sets were designed by the art director Arne Åkermark. It was filmed from June 26, 1939 to September 1, 1939.

== Cast ==
- Elof Ahrle as Loffe Larsson
- Sickan Carlsson as Eva Blomberg
- Gösta Cederlund as Axel Blomberg
- Elsa Carlsson as Mrs. Blomberg
- Åke Engfeldt as Kurt 'Kurre' Lindberg
- Eivor Landström as Marianne Blomberg
- Erik Berglund as Bengtsson
- Allan Bohlin as Gunnar Lundgren
- Willy Peters as Carl-Bertil Blomberg
- Margit Agrell as Greta, Carl-Bertil's date
- Artur Cederborgh as Garage owner
- Eric Laurent as Constable Eriksson

== Bibliography ==
- Qvist, Per Olov & von Bagh, Peter. Guide to the Cinema of Sweden and Finland. Greenwood Publishing Group, 2000.
