= Conscientious Objector Adolf =

1936 film

- Directed by: Sigurd Wallén
- Written by: Torsten Lundqvist; Weyler Hildebrand
- Produced by: Stellan Claësson
- Starring: Adolf Jahr; Karin Albihn; Weyler Hildebrand
- Cinematography: Julius Jaenzon
- Edited by: Rolf Husberg
- Music by: Fred Winter
- Production company: Svensk Talfilm
- Distributed by: Svensk Talfilm
- Release date: 13 January 1936
- Running time: 86 minutes
- Country: Sweden
- Language: Swedish

Conscientious Objector Adolf (Swedish: Samvetsömma Adolf) is a 1936 Swedish comedy film directed by Sigurd Wallén and starring Adolf Jahr, Karin Albihn and Weyler Hildebrand. It was shot at the Råsunda Studios in Stockholm. The film's sets were designed by the art director Arne Åkermark.

== Synopsis ==
An opera performer gains a leading role, but his joy is cut short when he is called up for military service.

== Cast ==
- Adolf Jahr as Adolf Berg
- Karin Albihn as Ulla Waern
- Weyler Hildebrand as Göransson
- Elsa Carlsson as Aunt Maria
- Torsten Winge as Lt. Pettersson
- Nils Ericsson as Knutte
- Stig Järrel as Anton
- Hugo Björne as Maj. Waern
- Bertil Anderberg as Läkarbiträde
- Wiktor Andersson as Den Tandlöse
- Astrid Bodin as Woman at Party
- Rolf Botvid as Man in Evening Dress
- Gudrun Brost as Woman at Party
- Eric Dahlström as Doctor
- Nils Ekstam as Director
- John Elfström as Läkarbiträde
- Georg Fernqvist as Captain
- Sigge Fürst as Man in Evening Dress
- Hilding Gavle as Colonel
- Karin Granberg as Woman at Party
- Richard Lund as Major
- Ethel Ohlin as Ballet Dancer
- Knut Pehrson as Judge
- Christian Schrøder as Lieutenant
- Alice Skoglund as Colonel's Friend
- Carl Ström as Captain
- Åke Uppström as Guard
- John Westin as Captain

== Bibliography ==
- Krawc, Alfred. International Directory of Cinematographers, Set- and Costume Designers in Film: Denmark, Finland, Norway, Sweden (from the beginnings to 1984). Saur, 1986.
