= Ruth Weijden =

Swedish actress

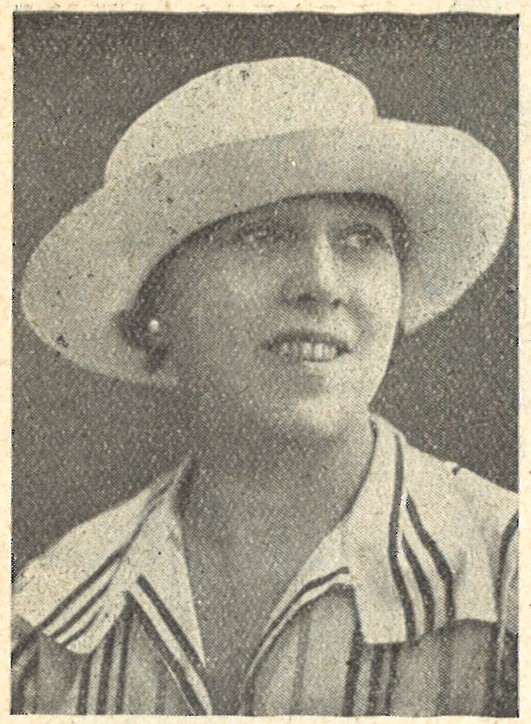
- Ruth Weijden circa 1927.
- Born: Ruth Augusta Gustafsson; 20 July 1889; Stockholm, Sweden
- Died: 27 June 1956 (aged 66); Stockholm, Sweden
- Occupation: Actress
- Years active: 1914–1949 (film)
- Spouse: Tor Weijden (1915 - 1920) (divorced)

Ruth Weijden (born Ruth Augusta Gustafsson; 20 July 1889 – 27 June 1956) was a Swedish stage and film actress. Having started acting in silent films, she later transitioned to “talkies”. She was married to Tor Weijden from 1915 to 1920.

== Selected filmography ==
- The Saga of Gosta Berling (1924)
- Sin (1928)
- Artificial Svensson (1929)
- Ulla, My Ulla (1930)
- His Life's Match (1932)
- What Do Men Know? (1933)
- Fridolf in the Lion's Den (1933)
- Saturday Nights (1933)
- Eva Goes Aboard (1934)
- Andersson's Kalle (1934)
- The Marriage Game (1935)
- The People of Småland (1935)
- The Family Secret (1936)
- Youth of Today (1936)
- Good Friends and Faithful Neighbours (1938)
- Storm Over the Skerries (1938)
- Lucky Young Lady (1941)
- A Girl for Me (1943)
- Count Only the Happy Moments (1944)
- Black Roses (1945)
- The Serious Game (1945)
- How to Love (1947)
- I Love You Karlsson (1947)
- The Devil and the Smalander (1949)

== Bibliography ==
- A. Kwiatkowski. Swedish Film Classics. Courier Corporation, 2013.
