= The False Millionaire =

1931 film

- Directed by: Paul Merzbach
- Written by: Henri Verdun (play); Oscar Rydqvist; Paul Merzbach
- Produced by: Stellan Claësson; Jacques Haïk
- Starring: Fridolf Rhudin; Zarah Leander; Annalisa Ericson
- Cinematography: Heinrich Balasch; Martin Bodin
- Edited by: Paul Merzbach
- Music by: Jules Sylvain; John Kåhrman
- Production companies: Les Établissements Jacques Haïk; Minerva Film AB
- Distributed by: Svensk Filmindustri
- Release date: 26 October 1931
- Running time: 90 minutes
- Countries: France; Sweden
- Language: Swedish

The False Millionaire (Swedish: Falska millionären) is a 1931 French-Swedish comedy film directed by Paul Merzbach and starring Fridolf Rhudin, Zarah Leander and Annalisa Ericson. It was shot at the Råsunda Studios in Stockholm and on location in the city. The film's sets were designed by the art director Vilhelm Bryde and Arne Åkermark. A separate French-language version Mon coeur et ses millions was also produced.

== Cast ==
- Fridolf Rhudin as Fridolf F. Johnson
- Zarah Leander as Marguerite Lebon
- Ingert Bjuggren as Baroness Brita Gyllenblad
- Håkan Westergren as Fridolf F. Johnson
- Erik Berglund asPolice officer
- Annalisa Ericson as Anna-Lisa
- Weyler Hildebrand as Weyler
- Olav Riégo as Dacapo
- Sture Lagerwall as Reporter
- Knut Lambert as Baron Gyllenblad
- Emma Meissner as Baroness Gyllenblad
- Gösta Lycke as Maitre d'
- Helge Andersson as Steward
- Gunnar Björnstrand as Member of the choir
- Tor Borong as Constable
- Josef Brandstedt as Trombone player
- Alice Carlsson as Woman on the ship
- Artur Cederborgh as Ship passenger
- Kotti Chave as Ship passenger
- Eivor Engelbrektsson as Young woman outside Grand Hotel
- Georg Fernqvist as Constable
- Sigge Fürst as Policeman
- Bengt-Olof Granberg as Man outside Grand Hotel
- Karin Granberg as Woman on the ship
- Paul Hagman as Maitre d'
- Carl Harald as Constable outside Grand Hotel
- Sune Holmqvist as Singing bellboy
- Per Hugo Jacobsson as Man outside Grand Hotel
- Ludde Juberg as Barber
- Axel Lagerberg as Police interrogating Fridolf
- Yngve Nyqvist as Constable
- Dagmar Olsson as Woman outside Grand Hotel
- Johan Petersson as Captain
- Harald Wehlnor as Constable outside Grand Hotel

== Bibliography ==
- Wallengren, Ann-Kristin. Welcome Home Mr Swanson: Swedish Emigrants and Swedishness on Film. Nordic Academic Press, 2014.
