= Skipper's Love =

1931 film

- Directed by: Ivar Johansson
- Written by: Ivar Johansson
- Produced by: Stellan Claësson
- Starring: Weyler Hildebrand; Einar Fagstad; Aino Taube
- Cinematography: Elner Åkesson; Martin Bodin; Åke Dahlqvist
- Edited by: Ivar Johansson
- Music by: Einar Fagstad
- Production company: Film AB Minerva
- Distributed by: Svensk Filmindustri
- Release date: 23 November 1931
- Running time: 93 minutes
- Country: Sweden
- Language: Swedish

Skipper's Love (Swedish: Skepparkärlek) is a 1931 Swedish comedy film directed by Ivar Johansson and starring Weyler Hildebrand, Einar Fagstad and Aino Taube. It was shot at the Råsunda Studios in Stockholm. The film's sets were designed by the art director Arne Åkermark.

== Cast ==
- Weyler Hildebrand as Oskar Julius Caesar Napoleon Karlsson
- Einar Fagstad as Harald Jensen
- Thyra Leijman-Uppström as Mrs. Lundbom
- Aino Taube as Majken Lundblom
- Sigurd Wallén as Norman
- Dagmar Ebbesen as Mrs. Norman
- Bengt Djurberg as Erik Jerker Norman
- Ragnar Widestedt as Borell
- Gösta Bodin as Drunk guest at Cosmopolite
- Tor Borong as Guest at 'Ankaret'
- Ernst Brunman as Police Lt. Svensson
- Lena Cederström as Guest at Cosmopolite
- Kotti Chave as Guest at Cosmopolite
- Ruth Stevens as Guest at Cosmopolite
- Sigge Fürst as Police constable
- Mona Geijer-Falkner as Guest at 'Ankaret'

== Bibliography ==
- Qvist, Per Olov & von Bagh, Peter. Guide to the Cinema of Sweden and Finland. Greenwood Publishing Group, 2000.
