= Secret Svensson =

1933 film

- Directed by: Schamyl Bauman
- Written by: Schamyl Bauman; Oscar Rydqvist
- Starring: Fridolf Rhudin; Weyler Hildebrand; Edvard Persson
- Cinematography: Harald Ernst Westerberg
- Edited by: Emil A. Lingheim
- Music by: Erik Baumann
- Production company: Europa Film
- Release date: 26 December 1933
- Running time: 100 minutes
- Country: Sweden
- Language: Swedish

Secret Svensson (Swedish:Hemliga Svensson) is a 1933 Swedish comedy film directed by Schamyl Bauman and starring Fridolf Rhudin, Weyler Hildebrand and Edvard Persson.

== Cast ==
- Fridolf Rhudin as Fridolf Svensson
- Weyler Hildebrand as Julius Göransson
- Edvard Persson as August Olsson
- Dagmar Ebbesen as Mrs. Jansson
- Rut Holm as Stina Jansson
- Emy Hagman as Eva Blomgren
- Ragnar Widestedt as Levenius
- Hugo Jacobsson as Nord
- Ernst Fastbom as Man
- Emil Fjellström as Tax Collector
- Alma Bodén as Fridolf's mother
- Märta Claesson as Mrs. Lindgren
- Nils Dahlström as Bus driver
- Erik Forslund as Man in line
- Knut Frankman as Man in line
- Lilly Kjellström as Maid
- John Melin as café owner
- Carl Reinholdz as Young man
- Greta Tegnér as Waitress on boat

== Bibliography ==
- Qvist, Per Olov & von Bagh, Peter. Guide to the Cinema of Sweden and Finland. Greenwood Publishing Group, 2000.
