= The People of Småland =

1935 film

- Directed by: Gösta Rodin
- Written by: Torsten Lundqvist; Gösta Rodin
- Starring: Sigurd Wallén; Sture Lagerwall; Sickan Carlsson
- Cinematography: Julius Jaenzon; Elner Åkesson
- Edited by: Gösta Rodin
- Music by: Ernfrid Ahlin
- Production company: Triangelfilm
- Distributed by: Svensk Talfilm
- Release date: 28 October 1935
- Running time: 106 minutes
- Country: Sweden
- Language: Swedish

The People of Småland (Swedish: Smålänningar) is a 1935 Swedish comedy film directed by Gösta Rodin and starring Sigurd Wallén, Sture Lagerwall and Sickan Carlsson. The film was shot at the Råsunda Studios in Stockholm and its sets designed by the art director Arne Åkermark.

== Cast ==
- Sigurd Wallén as Gustav Adolf Söderlund
- Sture Lagerwall as Gustav Söderlund
- Sickan Carlsson as Inga Blomgren
- Thor Modéen as Napoleon Olsson
- Eric Abrahamsson as Blomgren
- Torsten Winge as Berggren
- Hjalmar Peters as Johan Johansson
- Nils Jacobsson as Gille
- Bror Olsson as August Söderlund
- Emmy Albiin as Anna Söderlund
- Julia Cæsar as Vackra Olga
- Wiktor Andersson as Hotel clerk at Hotell Småland
- Johnny Bode as Musician
- Ernst Brunman as Kalle Broberg, ticket collector
- Artur Cederborgh as Ludvig Danielsson
- Emil Fjellström as Man on the street in Värnamo
- Hartwig Fock as Shop assistant in hat store
- Sune Holmqvist as Young man
- Nils Hultgren as Janitor at Blomgren's office
- Sven Jerring as Self
- Helge Kihlberg as Customer
- Eivin Lagergren as Musician
- Nils Larson as Musician
- Wilma Malmlöf as Woman
- Harry Essing as Man
- Erik Forslund as Man
- Richard Lindström as Clerk at Lindström & Co.
- Olav Riégo as Johansson
- Tom Walter as Man at the market
- Ruth Weijden as Inga's aunt

== Bibliography ==
- Wallengren, Ann-Kristin. Welcome Home Mr Swanson: Swedish Emigrants and Swedishness on Film. Nordic Academic Press, 2014.
