= Arne Åkermark =

Swedish art director

- Born: 12 October 1902; Stockholm, Sweden
- Died: 1962 (aged 59–60)
- Occupation: Art Director
- Years active: 1931–1962 (film)

Arne Åkermark (1902–1962) was a Swedish art director who worked on around a hundred and eighty films during a thirty-year career.

In 1948 Åkermark was employed in Britain for Ealing Studios epic Scott of the Antarctic.

== Selected filmography ==
- Colourful Pages (1931)
- Skipper's Love (1931)
- Dante's Mysteries (1931)
- The False Millionaire (1931)
- Ship Ahoy! (1931)
- Tired Theodore (1931)
- Black Roses (1932)
- Servant's Entrance (1932)
- International Match (1932)
- Mother-in-Law's Coming (1932)
- Love and Deficit (1932)
- His Life's Match (1932)
- Lucky Devils (1932)
- Dear Relatives (1933)
- Two Men and a Widow (1933)
- Augusta's Little Misstep (1933)
- Boman's Boy (1933)
- What Do Men Know? (1933)
- Marriageable Daughters (1933)
- The Song to Her (1934)
- Andersson's Kalle (1934)
- The Atlantic Adventure (1934)
- Fired (1934)
- Simon of Backabo (1934)
- Under False Flag (1935)
- The Marriage Game (1935)
- Walpurgis Night (1935)
- The People of Småland (1935)
- Adventure (1936)
- The Wedding Trip (1936)
- He, She and the Money (1936)
- Johan Ulfstjerna (1936)
- Conscientious Objector Adolf (1936)
- Unfriendly Relations (1936)
- It Pays to Advertise (1936)
- The Family Secret (1936)
- 65, 66 and I (1936)
- Russian Flu (1937)
- John Ericsson, Victor of Hampton Roads (1937)
- Conflict (1937)
- Oh, Such a Night! (1937)
- Sara Learns Manners (1937)
- The Andersson Family (1937)
- The Great Love (1938)
- Dollar (1938)
- Just a Bugler (1938)
- Good Friends and Faithful Neighbours (1938)
- Art for Art's Sake (1938)
- Thunder and Lightning (1938)
- Emilie Högquist (1939)
- Oh, What a Boy! (1939)
- Variety Is the Spice of Life (1939)
- Whalers (1939)
- Nothing But the Truth (1939)
- Kiss Her! (1940)
- With Open Arms (1940)
- One, But a Lion! (1940)
- The Crazy Family (1940)
- Bright Prospects (1941)
- Dunungen (1941)
- Poor Ferdinand (1941)
- Goransson's Boy (1941)
- We're All Errand Boys (1941)
- The Train Leaves at Nine (1941)
- The Fight Continues (1941)
- Tonight or Never (1941)
- It Is My Music (1942)
- There's a Fire Burning (1943)
- Katrina (1943)
- Dolly Takes a Chance (1944)
- The Emperor of Portugallia (1944)
- His Excellency (1944)
- The Invisible Wall (1944)
- The Gallows Man (1945)
- His Majesty Must Wait (1945)
- The Journey Away (1945)
- Affairs of a Model (1946)
- Sunshine Follows Rain (1946)
- The Balloon (1946)
- Poor Little Sven (1947)
- Private Karlsson on Leave (1947)
- Scott of the Antarctic (1948)
- Each Heart Has Its Own Story (1948)
- Pimpernel Svensson (1950)
- Restaurant Intim (1950)
- Living on 'Hope' (1951)
- Count Svensson (1951)
- The Girl from Backafall (1953)
- The Chieftain of Göinge (1953)
- Time of Desire (1954)
- Getting Married (1955)
- A Doll's House (1956)
- My Passionate Longing (1956)
- When the Mills are Running (1956)
- Woman in a Fur Coat (1958)
- A Difficult Parish (1958)
- Heart's Desire (1960)
- Lovely Is the Summer Night (1961)
- Ticket to Paradise (1962)

== Bibliography ==
- Barr, Charles. Ealing Studios. University of California Press, 1998.
