= Simon of Backabo =

1934 film

- Directed by: Gustaf Edgren
- Written by: Oscar Hemberg; Ragnhild Prim; Oscar Rydqvist
- Based on: Sympatiska Simon by Gösta Gustaf-Janson
- Produced by: Stellan Claësson
- Starring: Fridolf Rhudin; Hilda Borgström; Sickan Carlsson
- Cinematography: Martin Bodin
- Music by: Eric Bengtson
- Production company: Svensk Filmindustri
- Distributed by: Svensk Filmindustri
- Release date: 29 October 1934
- Running time: 93 minutes
- Country: Sweden
- Language: Swedish

Simon of Backabo (Swedish: Simon i Backabo) is a 1934 Swedish comedy film directed by Gustaf Edgren and starring Fridolf Rhudin, Hilda Borgström and Sickan Carlsson. It was shot at the Råsunda Studios in Stockholm. The film's sets were designed by the art director Arne Åkermark.

== Synopsis ==
A young man living with his grandmother and her maid Greta in the countryside, unexpectedly inherits a large fortune.

== Cast ==
- Fridolf Rhudin as Simon Jönsson
- Hilda Borgström as Grandmother
- Sickan Carlsson as Greta
- Thor Modéen as Gustaf Strömberg
- Semmy Friedmann as Dicke Lundén
- Mona Mårtenson as Mary Haglund
- Holger Löwenadler as Charley
- Emy Hagman as Jenny
- Weyler Hildebrand as Julius Göransson
- Carl Andersson as Frenchman
- Helge Andersson as Stationmaster in Backabo
- Naemi Briese as Lisa
- Wiola Brunius as Waitress
- Ernst Brunman as Man in reception committee
- Elsa Carlsson as Mademoiselle Claire de la Meunière
- Sonja Claesson as En kvinna
- Erland Colliander as Clerk at the Foreign Department
- Julia Cæsar as Mrs. Ewa Amalia Roos
- Nils Dahlgren as Man in reception committee
- Eric Dahlström as Train passenger
- Carl Deurell as Judge
- John Elfström as Petter i Hagen
- Albin Erlandzon as Man in Backabo
- Georg Fernqvist as Photographer
- Emil Fjellström as Porter
- Hartwig Fock as Auctioneer
- Knut Frankman as Man at the auction
- Sigge Fürst as Man interested in boxing
- Mona Geijer-Falkner as Woman at the auction
- Paul Hagman as Man
- Wictor Hagman as Photographer
- John Hilke as Journalist
- Nils Jacobsson as Journalist
- Sven Jerring as Radio Announcer
- Erik Johansson as Shopkeeper in Backabo
- Knut Lambert as Man in reception committee
- Arne Lindblad as Man
- Richard Lindström as Foreign department minister
- Walter Lindström as Policeman
- Helge Mauritz as Man in reception committee
- Martin Nilsson as Sjungande gast på Blenda
- Yngve Nyqvist as Man in reception committee
- Knut Pehrson as Flight Captain
- Algot Persson as Wardrober at Cafe de Paris
- Arvid Petersén as Ship broker
- Bellan Roos as Girl in News-Stand
- Wanda Rothgardt as Assistant at the Charm Institute
- Holger Sjöberg as Maitre d' at Cafe de Paris
- Georg Skarstedt as Gas salesman
- Hugo Tranberg as Man in reception committee
- Ilse-Nore Tromm as Guest at Cafe de Paris
- Tom Walter as Newspaper salesman
- Ivar Widner as Band leader

== Bibliography ==
- Larsson, Mariah & Marklund, Anders. Swedish Film: An Introduction and Reader. Nordic Academic Press, 2010.
- Qvist, Per Olov & von Bagh, Peter. Guide to the Cinema of Sweden and Finland. Greenwood Publishing Group, 2000.
