= International Match =

1932 film

- Directed by: Gunnar Skoglund
- Written by: Sigfrid Borgström; Gunnar Skoglund
- Produced by: Stellan Claësson
- Starring: Georg Blomstedt; Fritiof Billquist; Olof Sandborg
- Cinematography: Ferenc Zádori
- Edited by: Gunnar Skoglund
- Music by: Jules Sylvain
- Production company: Svensk Kulturfilm
- Distributed by: Svensk Filmindustri
- Release date: 29 March 1932
- Running time: 87 minutes
- Country: Sweden
- Language: Swedish

International Match (Swedish: Landskamp) is a 1932 Swedish drama film directed by Gunnar Skoglund and starring Georg Blomstedt, Fritiof Billquist and Olof Sandborg. It was shot at the Råsunda Studios in Stockholm and on location in the city. The film's sets were designed by the art director Arne Åkermark. Future star Ingrid Bergman made her screen debut in the film as an extra, appearing as a girl waiting in a queue.

== Synopsis ==
Erik, the son of a farmer, gets engaged to Brita a shop assistant. At his engagement party he ends up getting drunk. When a policeman is then stabbed with his knife, he is suspect but eventually cleared of any crime. However his father is so ashamed that he sells his farm and moves the family to Stockholm. There both Erik and his father struggle to find work, but eventually the son's athletic prowess allows him to get a job in a department store. His relationship with Brita becomes more distant, while his father himself becomes increasingly alcoholic and attempts suicide. at last Brita has a change of heart and helps Erik's father recover some money that had been stolen and buy back his farm and return to a life of sobriety.

== Cast ==
- Georg Blomstedt as Lars Erik Andersson
- Signe Lundberg-Settergren as Stina Andersson
- Fritiof Billquist as Erik Andersson
- Gun Holmqvist as Brita Blomstedt
- Olof Sandborg as Mr. Andelius
- Håkan Westergren as Otto Andelius
- Signhild Björkman as Karin Lind
- Nils Jacobsson as Wilhelm Bergstedt
- Arne Borg as Roffe Ek
- Jenny Tschernichin-Larsson as Mrs. Holmgren
- Emil Fjellström as Bootlegger
- Hjalmar Peters as Ruben Lindqvist
- Ragnar Falck as Pelle Björk
- Sigge Fürst as Police officer
- Holger Löwenadler as District Judge
- Georg Rydeberg as District-court recording clerk
- Concordia Selander as Fru Holmgren
- Olga Andersson as Andelius' wife
- Mona Geijer-Falkner as Buffet Manageress
- Eric Gustafson as Coach
- Gunnar Björnstrand as Student
- Carl Reinholdz as Tall Student
- Georg Skarstedt as Party Guest
- Ludde Juberg as Party Guest
- Helga Brofeldt as Party Guest
- Edla Rothgardt as Lady outside Store
- Ulla Billquist as Singer at Restaurant
- Ingrid Bergman as Girl Waiting in Line

== Bibliography ==
- Qvist, Per Olov & von Bagh, Peter. Guide to the Cinema of Sweden and Finland. Greenwood Publishing Group, 2000.
