= Gösta Alexandersson =

Swedish actor

- Born: 16 November 1905; Hedvig Eleonora Parish, Sweden
- Died: 17 March 1988 (aged 82); Karlstad, Sweden
- Occupation: Actor
- Years active: 1922-33
- Notable work: "Bomans pojke" and "Friaren från Landsvägen"

Gösta Alexandersson (16 November 1905 – 17 March 1988) was a Swedish actor best known for his roles in Bomans pojke and Friaren från Landsvägen.

== Filmography ==
- Thomas Graal's Ward (1922) – buspojke
- Andersson's Kalle (1922) – Kalle
- Amatörfilmen (1922) – smörgåsnisse
- The Suitor from the Highway (1923) – Gösta Lind
- New Pranks of Andersson's Kalle (1923) – Anderssonskans Kalle
- 40 Skipper Street (1925) – Tom
- Boman's Boy (1933) – bagarlärling
