= Kotti Chave =

Swedish actor (1911-1986)

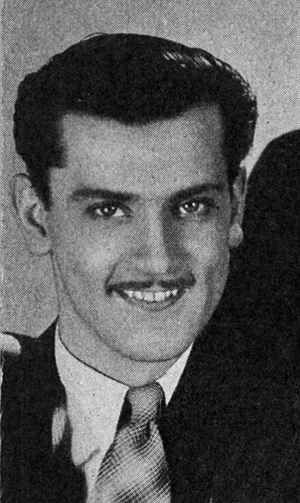
- Kotti Chave in Dollar (1938)
- Born: Björn Julius Haraldsson Chave; 18 September 1911; Helsinki, Grand Duchy of Finland
- Died: 4 May 1986 (aged 74); Nacka, Stockholms län, Sweden
- Occupation: Actor
- Years active: 1915-1974 (film)

Kotti Chave (born Björn Julius Haraldsson Chave; 18 September 1911 – 4 May 1986) was a Finnish-born Swedish film actor. He was the son of the theatre actor Harald Sandberg.

== Selected filmography ==
- In the Hour of Trial (1915)
- The False Millionaire (1931)
- Skipper's Love (1931)
- His Life's Match (1932)
- The Lady Becomes a Maid (1936)
- The Family Secret (1936)
- Sara Learns Manners (1937)
- John Ericsson, Victor of Hampton Roads (1937)
- Dollar (1938)
- Good Friends and Faithful Neighbours (1938)
- With Open Arms (1940)
- Första divisionen (1941)
- The Fight Continues (1941)
- Goransson's Boy (1941)
- Life and Death (1943)
- Katrina (1943)
- The Old Clock at Ronneberga (1944)
- The Lady in Black (1958)
- Mannequin in Red (1958)
- Musik ombord (1958)
- Fridolf Stands Up! (1958)
- Rider in Blue (1959)
- Good Friends and Faithful Neighbours (1960)

== Bibliography ==
- Lawrence J. Quirk. The films of Ingrid Bergman. Carol Pub Group, 1975.
