= Cavaliers of the Crown =

1930 film

- Directed by: Gustaf Edgren
- Written by: Sölve Cederstrand; Gustaf Edgren
- Starring: Fridolf Rhudin; Brita Appelgren; Weyler Hildebrand
- Cinematography: Hugo Edlund; Julius Jaenzon
- Music by: Eric Bengtson; John Kåhrman
- Production company: Film AB Minerva
- Distributed by: Svensk Filmindustri
- Release date: 1 December 1930
- Running time: 83 minutes
- Country: Sweden
- Languages: Silent; Swedish intertitles

Cavaliers of the Crown (Swedish: Kronans kavaljerer) is a 1930 Swedish silent comedy film directed by Gustaf Edgren and starring Fridolf Rhudin, Brita Appelgren and Weyler Hildebrand. It was shot at the Råsunda Studios in Stockholm. The film's sets were designed by the art director Vilhelm Bryde.

== Cast ==
- Fridolf Rhudin as Fridolf Svensson
- Weyler Hildebrand as Göran Göransson
- Brita Appelgren as Mary Björklund
- Stina Berg as Aunt Julia
- Helge Kihlberg as Uncle Göran
- Ragnar Arvedson as Dick Carter / Charles Paterson
- Nils Ericsson as Spiggen
- Knut Broberg as Cabaret Artist
- Valdemar Dalquist as Emmcee
- Ernst Brunman as Lawyer
- Carl-Hugo Calander as Man
- Eddie Figge as Mrs. Carter
- Wictor Hagman as Officer
- Olle Hilding as Con Man
- Gustav Hjorth as Man
- Maja Jerlström as Woman
- Ludde Juberg as Andersson
- Georg af Klercker as Officer
- Axel Lagerberg as Man
- Robert Ryberg as Con Man
- Carl Ström as Police chief

== Bibliography ==
- Qvist, Per Olov & von Bagh, Peter. Guide to the Cinema of Sweden and Finland. Greenwood Publishing Group, 2000.
