= Olle Hilding =

Swedish actor (1898–1983)

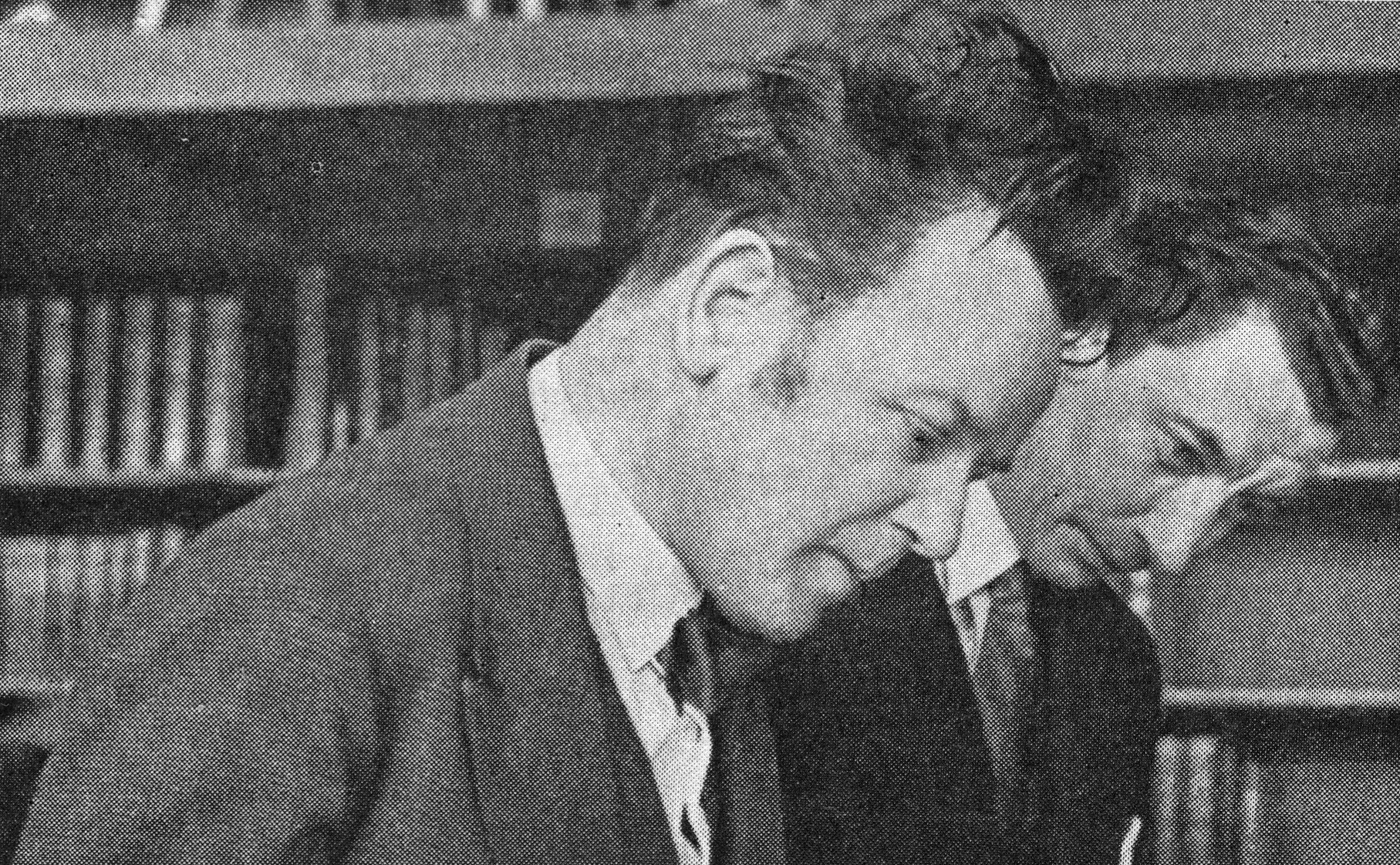
Author Erik Lindorm and Olle Hilding

Olle Hilding (born Hilding Olof Johansson; 19 July 1898 – 9 November 1983) was a Swedish stage and film actor. He appeared in motion pictures between 1923-1982.

== Biography ==
Hilding Olof Johansson was born and died in the Katarina Parish of Stockholm, Sweden. From 1920–1923 he toured the country with the theater company of Oscar Winge (1884-1951) and made his film debut under the direction of film director, Victor Sjöström (1879–1960) in Vem doer (1922). During much of the 1930s, Hilding helped author Erik Lindorm (1889-1941), with his book chronicles, most of which featured historical personalities and events as themes. Hilding returned to the theater in 1940. In 1934 he married actress Olga Appellöf (1898-1989). He won the Eugene O'Neill Award in 1973.

== Partial filmography ==
- Johan Ulfstjerna (1923) - Conspirator (uncredited)
- Artificial Svensson (1929) - Soldat (uncredited)
- Ulla, My Ulla (1930) - Court Valet (uncredited)
- Cavaliers of the Crown (1930) - Con Man (uncredited)
- Ship Ahoy! (1931) - Waitor (uncredited)
- Landskamp (1932) - Member of price committee (uncredited)
- Wife for a Day (1933) - Benjamin
- Fired (1934) - Aron Jacobsky (uncredited)
- Adolf Strongarm (1937) - Henriksson / Henrik Mjölnare
- Good Friends and Faithful Neighbours (1938) - Emil Norling
- Då länkarna smiddes (1939) - Forsman
- Mot nya tider (1939) - Chess Player (uncredited)
- Emilie Högquist (1939) - Dinner Guest (uncredited)
- Heroes in Yellow and Blue (1940) - Courtroom Clerk (uncredited)
- Landstormens lilla argbigga (1941) - Private (uncredited)
- Dunungen (1941) - Ehinger
- Dangerous Ways (1942) - Prant's Co-worker (uncredited)
- Adventurer (1942) - Pater Josef
- The Word (1943) - Brandeus
- Kajan går till sjöss (1943) - Policeman (uncredited)
- Excellensen (1944) - Gammal judisk man
- Live Dangerously (1944) - Olof
- My People Are Not Yours (1944) - Caretaker
- Som folk är mest (1944) - Lagerchefen (uncredited)
- Wandering with the Moon (1945) - Dan's Father (uncredited)
- Försök inte med mej..! (1946) - Priest (uncredited)
- Brita in the Merchant's House (1946) - Olsson (uncredited)
- Åsa-Hanna (1946) - Efraim
- Kristin Commands (1946) - Man at Auction (uncredited)
- Det glada kalaset (1946) - Lawyer
- Harald the Stalwart (1946) - Harald's father
- Livet i Finnskogarna (1947) - Pregnant girl's father (uncredited)
- The Key and the Ring (1947) - Falk
- Här kommer vi... (1947) - Teaterchefen (uncredited)
- Sin (1948) - Banker
- The Quartet That Split Up (1950) - Thun (uncredited)
- Barabbas (1953) - Old Potter at Jerusalem (uncredited)
- The Shadow (1953) - Berggren
- Marianne (1953) - Erik Ekman
- No Man's Woman (1953) - Henriksson, Judith's father (uncredited)
- Café Lunchrasten (1954) - Editor (uncredited)
- Seger i mörker (1954) - Bergquist
- Simon the Sinner (1954) - Believer
- Getting Married (1955) - Farm hand (uncredited)
- Ratataa eller The Staffan Stolle Story (1956) - Salamander, antikvitetshandlare (uncredited)
- Synnöve Solbakken (1957) - Priest (uncredited)
- Värmlänningarna (1957) - Jan Hansson
- Fridolf Stands Up! (1958) - Nilsson
- Fly mej en greve (1959) - Violinist (uncredited)
- Fridolfs farliga ålder (1959) - Nilsson
- Ön (1966) - Persson
- The Man Who Quit Smoking (1972) - Sjöström, lawyer
- En enkel melodi (1974)
- Långt borta och nära (1976) - Old Gesticulating Man
- Fanny and Alexander (1982) - Old Clergyman - Ekdahlska huset

== Other sources ==
- Olle Hilding at IMDb
- Olle Hilding at the Swedish Film Database
