= Elner Åkesson =

Swedish cinematographer (1890–1962)

- Born: 28 January 1890; Stockholm, Sweden-Norway
- Died: 7 April 1962 (aged 72); Stockholm, Sweden
- Occupations: Actor, Writer, Director
- Years active: 1921-1952 (film)

Elner Åkesson (1890–1962) was a Swedish cinematographer who worked on more than forty-five films.

== Selected filmography ==
- Skipper's Love (1931)
- Ship Ahoy! (1931)
- The Storholmen Brothers (1932)
- People of Hälsingland (1933)
- Boman's Boy (1933)
- The Atlantic Adventure (1934)
- The People of Småland (1935)
- Under False Flag (1935)
- He, She and the Money (1936)
- 65, 66 and I (1936)
- Oh, Such a Night! (1937)
- Thunder and Lightning (1938)
- Variety Is the Spice of Life (1939)
- Oh, What a Boy! (1939)
- Only One Night (1939)
- The Crazy Family (1940)
- Only a Woman (1941)
- Dangerous Ways (1942)
- Mister Collins' Adventure (1943)
- Gentleman with a Briefcase (1943)
- We Need Each Other (1944)
- Widower Jarl (1945)
- When the Meadows Blossom (1946)

== Bibliography ==
- Hagener, Malte. The Emergence of Film Culture: Knowledge Production, Institution Building, and the Fate of the Avant-garde in Europe, 1919-1945. Berghahn Books, 2014.
