= Andersson's Kalle (1922 film) =

1922 film

- Directed by: Sigurd Wallén
- Based on: Andersson's Kalle by Emil Norlander
- Produced by: Fredrik Andersson
- Starring: Gösta Alexandersson; Dagmar Ebbesen; Stina Berg
- Cinematography: Adrian Bjurman
- Production company: Fredfilm
- Distributed by: Fredrik Andersons Filmbyrå
- Release date: 4 September 1922
- Running time: 65 minutes
- Country: Sweden
- Languages: Silent; Swedish intertitles

Andersson's Kalle (Swedish: Anderssonskans Kalle) is a 1922 Swedish silent comedy film directed by Sigurd Wallén and starring Gösta Alexandersson, Dagmar Ebbesen and Stina Berg. It is based on the 1901 novel of the same title by Emil Norlander, which has been adapted into films on several occasions. It was followed by a sequel New Pranks of Andersson's Kalle in 1923. In 1934 Wallén remade it into a sound film.

== Cast ==
- Gösta Alexandersson as Kalle
- Anna Diedrich as Anderssonskan
- Dagmar Ebbesen as Pilgrenskan
- Stina Berg as Bobergskan
- Eugen Nilsson as Pilgren
- Aino Schärlund-Gille as Ann-Mari Graham
- Edith Wallén as Mjölk-Fia
- Hanna Rudahl as Petterssonskan
- Julia Cæsar as Lövbergskan
- Carl-Gunnar Wingård as Mogren
- Mathilda Caspér as Magasinsfrun
- Maja Cassel as Fru Graham
- Albin Lindahl as Graham
- Gertie Löweström as Pilgrenskans dotter

== Bibliography ==
- Qvist, Per Olov & von Bagh, Peter. Guide to the Cinema of Sweden and Finland. Greenwood Publishing Group, 2000.
