= Artur Cederborgh =

Swedish actor

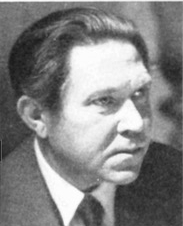
- Born: 30 December 1885; Stockholm, Sweden
- Died: 15 April 1961 (aged 75); Stockholm, Sweden
- Occupation: Actor
- Years active: 1919-1957

Artur Cederborgh (30 December 1885 – 15 April 1961) was a Swedish actor. He appeared in more than 70 films between 1919 and 1957.

== Selected filmography ==
- Synnöve Solbakken (1919)
- The Tales of Ensign Stål (1926)
- The Realm of the Rye (1929)
- Ulla, My Ulla (1930)
- The False Millionaire (1931)
- Tired Theodore (1931)
- Flickan från Värmland (1931)
- Black Roses (1932)
- Lucky Devils (1932)
- The Atlantic Adventure (1934)
- Andersson's Kalle (1934)
- The Boys of Number Fifty Seven (1935)
- The People of Småland (1935)
- 65, 66 and I (1936)
- Sara Learns Manners (1937)
- Mother Gets Married (1937)
- Adolf Strongarm (1937)
- Adolf Saves the Day (1938)
- Nothing But the Truth (1939)
- We at Solglantan (1939)
- Oh, What a Boy! (1939)
- The Crazy Family (1940)
- Only a Woman (1941)
- Lasse-Maja (1941)
- How to Tame a Real Man (1941)
- The Ghost Reporter (1941)
- Sun Over Klara (1942)
- Doctor Glas (1942)
- Adventurer (1942)
- Gentleman with a Briefcase (1943)
- She Thought It Was Him (1943)
- The Brothers' Woman (1943)
- In Darkest Smaland (1943)
- My People Are Not Yours (1944)
- The Forest Is Our Heritage (1944)
- Blizzard (1944)
- The Rose of Tistelön (1945)
- Kvarterets olycksfågel (1947)
- Neglected by His Wife (1947)
- The Girl from the Marsh Croft (1947)
- Each Heart Has Its Own Story (1948)
- On These Shoulders (1948)
- Realm of Man (1949)
- The People of Hemsö (1955)
- Getting Married (1955)
- The Minister of Uddarbo (1957)
