= Sigurd Wallén =

Swedish actor

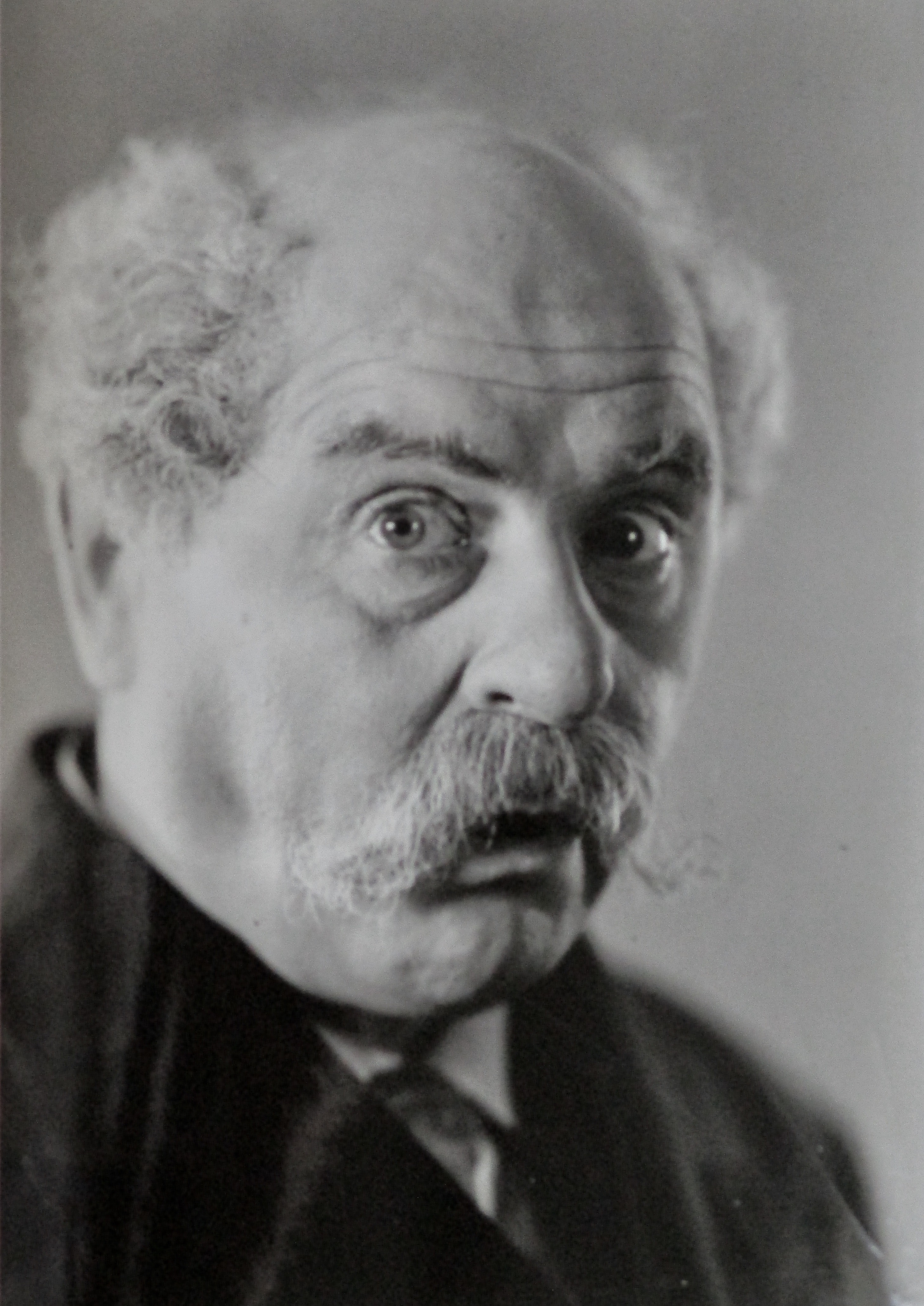
- Photo by Louis Huch.
- Born: Sigurd Richard Engelbrekt Wallén; 1 September 1884; Husbykvarn, Tierp, Sweden
- Died: 20 March 1947 (aged 62); Stockholm, Sweden
- Occupation: Actor
- Years active: 1911–1947

Sigurd Richard Engelbrekt Wallén (1 September 1884 – 20 March 1947) was a Swedish actor, film director, and singer.

== Selected filmography ==
- His Lordship's Last Will (1919)
- Andersson's Kalle (1922)
- New Pranks of Andersson's Kalle (1923)
- The Suitor from the Highway (1923)
- The Counts at Svansta (1924)
- Her Little Majesty (1925)
- The Million Dollars (1926)
- Uncle Frans (1926)
- The Queen of Pellagonia (1927)
- Jansson's Temptation (1928)
- Frida's Songs (1930)
- Skipper's Love (1931)
- Colourful Pages (1931)
- The Red Day (1932)
- His Life's Match (1932)
- The Storholmen Brothers (1932)
- Love and Deficit (1932)
- Servant's Entrance (1932)
- Black Roses (1932)
- Lucky Devils (1932)
- Marriageable Daughters (1933)
- Boman's Boy (1933)
- Andersson's Kalle (1934)
- The Count of the Old Town (1935)
- Swedenhielms (1935)
- The People of Småland (1935)
- Shipwrecked Max (1936)
- Conscientious Objector Adolf (1936)
- Adolf Strongarm (1937)
- John Ericsson, Victor of Hampton Roads (1937)
- Conflict (1937)
- The Andersson Family (1937)
- A Woman's Face (1938)
- Mot nya tider (1939)
- June Nights (1940)
- A Crime (1940)
- A Real Man (1940)
- With Open Arms (1940)
- Life Goes On (1941)
- The Poor Millionaire (1941)
- It Is My Music (1942)
- Night in Port (1943)
- In Darkest Smaland (1943)
- Imprisoned Women (1943)
- The People of Hemsö (1944)
- Skipper Jansson (1944)
- Widower Jarl (1945)
- Crime and Punishment (1945)
- When the Meadows Blossom (1946)
