= Fridolf in the Lion's Den =

1933 film

- Directed by: Weyler Hildebrand
- Written by: Konrad Maril (play) Schamyl Bauman; Weyler Hildebrand
- Starring: Fridolf Rhudin; Aino Taube; Björn Berglund
- Cinematography: Ernst Westerberg
- Edited by: Emil A. Pehrsson
- Music by: Sten Axelsson; Erik Baumann
- Production company: Europa Film
- Distributed by: Europa Film
- Release date: 11 March 1933
- Running time: 73 minutes
- Country: Sweden
- Language: Swedish

Fridolf in the Lion's Den (Swedish: Fridolf i lejonkulan) is a 1933 Swedish comedy film directed by Weyler Hildebrand and starring Fridolf Rhudin, Aino Taube and Björn Berglund. It was shot at the Sundbyberg Studios of Europa Film in Stockholm.

== Synopsis ==
Fridolf gets married without realising that his first wife is still alive and he has committed bigamy. He tracks his wife down when the circus comes to town.

== Cast ==
- Fridolf Rhudin as Fridolf Svensson
- Weyler Hildebrand as Police inspector Göransson
- Gueye Rolf as Ludmila
- Björn Berglund as Erik
- Aino Taube as Margit Vedholm
- Julia Cæsar as Mrs. Jonsson
- Rut Holm as Beda
- Erik A. Petschler as Circus manager
- Wiola Brunius as Girl at the shooting gallery
- Alice Carlsson as Clerk at the circus
- Lena Cederström as Girl at the shooting gallery
- Joel Jansson as Officer Tysk
- Ludde Juberg as Circus worker
- Artur Rolén as Pharmacist
- Holger Sjöberg as Polish wrestler
- Åke Uppström as Circus visitor
- Ruth Weijden as Barnmorskan

== Bibliography ==
- Larsson, Mariah & Marklund, Anders. Swedish Film: An Introduction and Reader. Nordic Academic Press, 2010.
