= Ernst Brunman =

Swedish actor

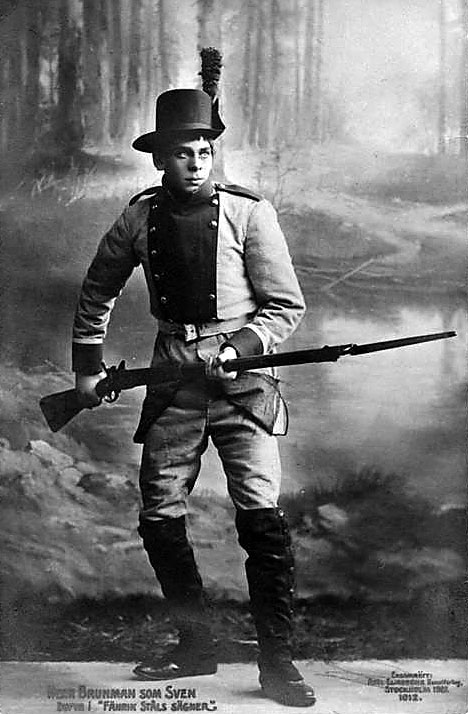
- Brunman (c.1912)
- Born: 2 August 1886; Stockholm, Sweden
- Died: 1 January 1961 (aged 74); Stockholm, Sweden
- Occupation: Actor
- Years active: 1919–1956 (film)

Ernst Olof Wilhelm Brunman (2 August 1886 – 1 January 1961) was a Swedish stage and film actor.

== Selected filmography ==
- Johan Ulfstjerna (1923)
- Artificial Svensson (1929)
- Ulla, My Ulla (1930)
- Frida's Songs (1930)
- Cavaliers of the Crown (1930)
- Skipper's Love (1931)
- The Red Day (1931)
- Kärlek och landstorm (1931)
- Colourful Pages (1931)
- Simon of Backabo (1934)
- The Marriage Game (1935)
- Kanske en gentleman (1935)
- The People of Småland (1935)
- Under False Flag (1935)
- Johan Ulfstjerna (1936)
- Life Begins Today (1939)
- They Staked Their Lives (1940)
- A Real Man (1940)
- Heroes in Yellow and Blue (1940)
- Blossom Time (1940)
- The Fight Continues (1941)
- Lasse-Maja (1941)
- Scanian Guerilla (1941)
- There's a Fire Burning (1943)
- In Darkest Smaland (1943)
- A Girl for Me (1943)
- The Rose of Tistelön (1945)
- Affairs of a Model (1946)
- The Balloon (1946)
- Don't Give Up (1947)
- Crime in the Sun (1947)
- Lilla Märta kommer tillbaka (1948)
- Private Bom (1948)
- Only a Mother (1949)
- Realm of Man (1949)
- Father Bom (1949)
- To Joy (1950)
- The Quartet That Split Up (1950)
- Summer Interlude (1951)
- Defiance (1952)
- Summer with Monika (1953)
- Enchanted Walk (1954)
- Wild Birds (1955)
- The Song of the Scarlet Flower (1956)

== Bibliography ==
- Steene, Birgitta. Ingmar Bergman: A Reference Guide. Amsterdam University Press, 2005.
