= Bertil Anderberg =

Swedish actor

- Born: Otto Bertil Anderberg; 13 February 1913; Malmö, Sweden
- Died: 11 September 1991 (aged 78); Gothenburg, Sweden
- Years active: 1936–1981

Otto Bertil Anderberg (13 February 1913 – 11 September 1991) was a Swedish film actor. He was born in Malmö, Sweden and died in Gothenburg.

== Filmography ==
Year	Title	Role	Notes
1936	Conscientious Objector Adolf	Läkarbiträde	Uncredited
1939	Only One Night	Carnival Visitor	Uncredited
1944	Skåningar	Holger, tailor	
1946	It Rains on Our Love	Police constable	Uncredited
1957	The Seventh Seal	Raval	
1962	Chans	Natan	
1968	Hour of the Wolf	Ernst von Merkens	
1970	Grisjakten	Thorne-Löwe	
