= Andersson's Kalle (1934 film) =

1934 film

- Directed by: Sigurd Wallén
- Written by: Sölve Cederstrand; Sigurd Wallén
- Based on: Andersson's Kalle by Emil Norlander
- Produced by: Stellan Claësson
- Starring: Thor Modéen; Tollie Zellman; Naemi Briese
- Cinematography: Åke Dahlqvist
- Edited by: Rolf Husberg
- Music by: Eric Bengtson
- Production company: Wivefilm
- Distributed by: Film AB Warner Bros.-First National
- Release date: 15 August 1934
- Running time: 77 minutes
- Country: Sweden
- Language: Swedish

Andersson's Kalle (Swedish: Anderssonskans Kalle) is a 1934 Swedish comedy film directed by Sigurd Wallén and starring Thor Modéen, Tollie Zellman and Naemi Briese. It was shot at the Råsunda Studios and on location around Stockholm. The film's sets were designed by the art director Arne Åkermark. It is based on the 1901 novel of the same title by Emil Norlander, which has been adapted into films on several occasions.

== Synopsis ==
Kalle, a young boy who is fond of practical jokes, lives in the Södermalm district of Stockholm with his elder sister Majken and his widowed mother. His pranks land him in trouble with the local police officer.

== Cast ==
- Thor Modéen as Police Constable Jonsson
- Tollie Zellman as Bobergskan
- Hjördis Petterson as Mrs. Pilgren
- Signe Lundberg-Settergren as Anderssonskan
- Naemi Briese as Majken
- Nils Hallberg as Kalle Andersson
- Björn Berglund as Gustaf Bergström
- Weyler Hildebrand as Schröder
- Jullan Kindahl as Mrs. Lundström
- Julia Cæsar as Lövdalskan
- Sonja Claesson as Lundkvistskan
- Wilma Malmlöf as Lindkvistskan
- Thyra Leijman-Uppström as Ferry Passenger
- Millan Fjellström as Petterssonskan
- Nils Wahlbom as Second
- Emil Fjellström as Farm Hand
- Anna Olin as Landlady
- Gerda Björne as Teacher
- Olof Sandborg as Doctor
- Stina Seelig as Teacher
- Artur Cederborgh as Bricklayer
- Einar Fagstad as Steersman
- Gustaf Lövås as Gardner
- Rudolf Svensson as Bricklayer
- John Ericsson as Bricklayer
- Sven-Eric Gamble as Boy
- Mona Geijer-Falkner as Cleaning lady
- Ruth Weijden as Lady
- Helga Brofeldt as Woman on the boat
- Erland Colliander as Managing Director

== Bibliography ==
- Qvist, Per Olov & von Bagh, Peter. Guide to the Cinema of Sweden and Finland. Greenwood Publishing Group, 2000.
