= Fridolf Rhudin =

Swedish actor

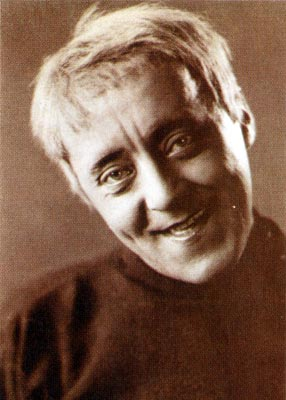
- Born: Sixten Fridolf Emanuel Rudin; 10 October 1895; Munkfors, Sweden
- Died: 6 March 1935 (aged 39); Stockholm, Sweden
- Years active: 1920–1934

Fridolf Rhudin (10 October 1895 – 6 March 1935) was a Swedish actor and comedian.

== Filmography ==
- Simon of Backabo (1934)
- Secret Svensson (1933)
- Fridolf in the Lion's Den (1933)
- Jolly Musicians (1932)
- Pojkarna på Storholmen (1932)
- Ship Ahoy! (1931)
- The False Millionaire (1931)
- Cavaliers of the Crown (1930)
- Finurliga Fridolf (1929)
- Artificial Svensson (1929)
- Black Rudolf (1928)
- Den Sorglustige barberaren (1927)
- The Ghost Baron (1927)
- The Rivals (1926)
- Mordbrännerskan (1926)
- First Mate Karlsson's Sweethearts (1925)
- För hemmet och flickan (1925)
- Flickan från paradiset (1924)
- The People of Simlang Valley (1924)
- Närkingarna (1923)
- Fröken på Björneborg (1922)
- Körkarlen (1921)
- Värmlänningarna (1921)
- Carolina Rediviva (1920)
- Erotikon (1920)
- Mästerman (1920)
