= Sigge Fürst =

Swedish actor (1905–1984)

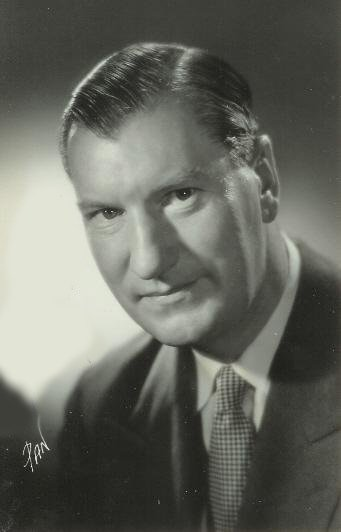
- Born: Karl Sigurd Tore Fürst; 3 November 1905; Stockholm, Sweden
- Died: 11 June 1984 (aged 78); Stockholm, Sweden
- Occupations: Actor, singer, entertainer, presenter, policeman
- Years active: 1931–1981
- Spouse: Ingrid Wallin (m. 1935–1984)
- Children: Lena (born 1936)

Karl Sigurd Tore "Sigge" Fürst (3 November 1905 – 11 June 1984) was a Swedish film actor who appeared in more than 130 films. He was born in Stockholm, Sweden and died there of lung cancer in 1984.

As well as appearing in films, Fürst made several radio shows, like the long-running Frukostklubben (the breakfast club) broadcast on radio on Saturday mornings from 1946-1949 and 1955-1978 (from 1968 also on Sundays), with invited guests.

== Selected filmography ==
- The False Millionaire (1931)
- Skipper's Love (1931)
- His Life's Match (1932)
- International Match (1932)
- Lucky Devils (1932)
- Dear Relatives (1933)
- Marriageable Daughters (1933)
- False Greta (1934)
- Simon of Backabo (1934)
- Melody of the Sea (1934)
- 65, 66 and I (1936)
- Conscientious Objector Adolf (1936)
- Adolf Strongarm (1937)
- Happy Vestköping (1937)
- Hotel Paradise (1937)
- Witches' Night (1937)
- Comrades in Uniform (1938)
- Career (1938)
- Her Little Majesty (1939)
- Kiss Her! (1940)
- Heroes in Yellow and Blue (1940)
- Woman on Board (1941)
- Goransson's Boy (1941)
- Lucky Young Lady (1941)
- Night in Port (1943)
- My People Are Not Yours (1944)
- His Excellency (1944)
- The Gallows Man (1945)
- The Girls in Smaland (1945)
- Widower Jarl (1945)
- The Balloon (1946)
- Evening at the Djurgarden (1946)
- Pengar – en tragikomisk saga (1946)
- Don't Give Up (1947)
- Carnival Evening (1948)
- Father Bom (1949)
- Love Wins Out (1949)
- The Devil and the Smalander (1949)
- Woman in White (1949)
- When Love Came to the Village (1950)
- The Motor Cavaliers (1950)
- The Saucepan Journey (1950)
- Knockout at the Breakfast Club (1950)
- Sköna Helena (1951)
- Summer with Monika (1953)
- A Lesson in Love (1954)
- Storm Over Tjurö (1954)
- Salka Valka (1954)
- Men in the Dark (1955)
- Smiles of a Summer Night (1955)
- Darling of Mine (1955)
- The Summer Wind Blows (1955)
- Seventh Heaven (1956)
- The Staffan Stolle Story (1956)
- The Girl in Tails (1956)
- A Little Nest (1956)
- Encounters in the Twilight (1957)
- Summer Place Wanted (1957)
- Bill Bergson Lives Dangerously (1957)
- More Than a Match for the Navy (1958)
- The Jazz Boy (1958)
- Only a Waiter (1959)
- The Beloved Game (1959)
- Heaven and Pancake (1959)
- A Lion in Town (1959)
- The Die Is Cast (1960)
- When Darkness Falls (1960)
- On a Bench in a Park (1960)
- Ticket to Paradise (1962)
- Äktenskapsbrottaren (1964)
- Shame (1968)
- The Passion of Anna (1969)
