= His Life's Match =

1932 film

- Directed by: Per-Axel Branner
- Written by: Per-Axel Branner (novel); Erik Lindorm
- Starring: Georg Blomstedt; Björn Berglund; Sigurd Wallén
- Cinematography: Martin Bodin; Åke Dahlqvist; Hugo Edlund
- Edited by: Rolf Husberg
- Music by: Jules Sylvain
- Production company: Film AB Minerva
- Release date: 18 January 1932
- Running time: 85 minutes
- Country: Sweden
- Language: Swedish

His Life's Match (Swedish: Hans livs match) is a 1932 Swedish comedy film directed by Per-Axel Branner and starring Georg Blomstedt, Björn Berglund and Sigurd Wallén.

The film's sets were designed by the art director Arne Åkermark.

== Cast ==
- Georg Blomstedt as Contractor Gawell
- Björn Berglund as Gunnar Gawell
- Sigurd Wallén as Jonas Häggblom
- Ruth Weijden as Karolina Häggblom
- Birgit Tengroth as Ann-Mari Häggblom
- Harry Isacsson as Kalle Häggblom
- Håkan Westergren as Freddy Bellin
- Nils Lundell as Danzig
- Julia Cæsar as Woman in window
- Carl Ström as Karlsson
- Gunnar Björnstrand as Student carrying 'Nicken'
- Helga Brofeldt as Woman in window
- Kotti Chave as Young man in the audience
- Hartwig Fock as News paper salesman
- Sigge Fürst as Dancing guest at restaurant
- Helge Hagerman as Young man in audience
- Gustaf Hedström as Maître d'
- Hugo Jacobsson as Distranor
- Sven Jerring as Radiokommentator
- Jullan Jonsson as Lady in window
- Ludde Juberg as Guest at Reinholds Café
- Ernst Rolf as Cheerleader
- Sven-Olof Sandberg as Singer at restaurant

== Bibliography ==
- Qvist, Per Olov & von Bagh, Peter. Guide to the Cinema of Sweden and Finland. Greenwood Publishing Group, 2000.
