= Torsten Lundqvist =

Swedish screenwriter

- Born: 14 June 1894; Stockholm, Sweden
- Died: 12 January 1957 (aged 62); Sweden
- Occupations: Director, Writer
- Years active: 1931-1955 (film)

Torsten Lundqvist (14 June 1894 – 12 January 1957) was a Swedish screenwriter. He worked one many scripts during the 1930s and 1940s, and was one of the three most prolific screenwriters in Swedish cinema alongside Sölve Cederstrand and Gösta Stevens. He also directed three films.

== Selected filmography ==
- A Night of Love by the Öresund (1931)
- Wife for a Day (1933)
- A Wedding Night at Stjarnehov (1934)
- The People of Småland (1935)
- It Pays to Advertise (1936)
- He, She and the Money 1936)
- Unfriendly Relations (1936)
- Conscientious Objector Adolf (1936)
- 65, 66 and I (1936)
- The Andersson Family (1937)
- Adolf Strongarm (1937)
- Oh, Such a Night! (1937)
- Good Friends and Faithful Neighbours (1938)
- Just a Bugler (1938)
- Whalers (1939)
- We at Solglantan (1939)
- Nothing But the Truth (1939)
- Frestelse (1940)
- Kiss Her! (1940)
- The Crazy Family (1940)
- Goransson's Boy (1941)
- Nothing Is Forgotten (1942)
- We House Slaves (1942)
- Doctor Glas (1942)
- In Darkest Smaland (1943)
- The Green Lift (1944)
- Guttersnipes (1944)
- Motherhood (1945)
- 100 dragspel och en flicka (1946)

== Bibliography ==
- Iverson, Gunnar, Soderbergh Widding, Astrid & Soila, Tytti. Nordic National Cinemas. Routledge, 2005.
- Taves, Brian. P.G. Wodehouse and Hollywood: Screenwriting, Satires and Adaptations. McFarland, 2006.
