= New Pranks of Andersson's Kalle =

1923 film

- Directed by: Sigurd Wallén
- Based on: Andersson's Kalle by Emil Norlander
- Starring: Gösta Alexandersson; Dagmar Ebbesen; Edvin Adolphson
- Cinematography: Henrik Jaenzon
- Edited by: Sigurd Wallén
- Production company: Bewefilm
- Distributed by: Wahlströms Filmbyrå
- Release date: 27 August 1923
- Running time: 64 minutes
- Country: Sweden
- Languages: Silent; Swedish intertitles

New Pranks of Andersson's Kalle (Swedish: Anderssonskans Kalle på nya upptåg) is a 1923 silent comedy film directed by Sigurd Wallén and starring Gösta Alexandersson, Dagmar Ebbesen and Edvin Adolphson. It is a sequel to the 1922 film Andersson's Kalle which was based on the 1901 novel of the same title by Emil Norlander.

== Synopsis ==
Kalle a young boy from the working class Södermalm district of Stockholm is adopted by a wealthy family and introduced into the high society of the city. However, he remains fond of practical jokes.

== Cast ==
- Gösta Alexandersson as Kalle
- Anna Diedrich as Anderssonsskan
- Dagmar Ebbesen as Pilgrenskan
- Albin Lindahl as Graham
- Hilda Castegren as Clövercrona
- Mona Mårtenson as Ruth Graha, direktørns syster
- Edvin Adolphson as Paul Abraham Ceder
- Julia Cæsar as Lövbergskan
- Hildur Skantze as Mrs. Graham
- Carl-Gunnar Wingård as Mogren

== Bibliography ==
- Qvist, Per Olov & von Bagh, Peter. Guide to the Cinema of Sweden and Finland. Greenwood Publishing Group, 2000.
