= Gösta Rodin =

Swedish film director and writer

- Born: 18 April 1902; Stockholm, Sweden
- Died: 6 June 1982 (aged 80); Stockholm, Sweden
- Occupations: Writer, Director, Editor
- Years active: 1931-1946 (film)

Gösta Rodin (April 18, 1902 – June 6, 1982) was a Swedish screenwriter and film director.

== Selected filmography ==
- Kärlek och landstorm (1931)
- Wife for a Day (1933)
- Äventyr på hotell (1934)
- The People of Småland (1935)
- Bombi Bitt och Jag (1936)
- The Pale Count (1937)
- A Cruise in the Albertina (1938)
- Oh, What a Boy! (1939)
- The Train Leaves at Nine (1941)
- Evening at the Djurgarden (1946)

== Bibliography ==
- Wallengren, Ann-Kristin. Welcome Home Mr Swanson: Swedish Emigrants and Swedishness on Film. Nordic Academic Press, 2014.
- Wright, Rochelle. The Visible Wall: Jews and Other Ethnic Outsiders in Swedish Film. SIU Press, 1998.
