= Good Friends and Faithful Neighbours (1938 film) =

1938 film

- Directed by: Weyler Hildebrand
- Written by: Weyler Hildebrand; Torsten Lundqvist
- Produced by: Stellan Claësson; Tor Borong
- Starring: Ludde Gentzel; Greta Almroth; Eric Abrahamsson
- Cinematography: Erik Bergstrand
- Edited by: Oscar Rosander
- Music by: Gunnar Johansson; Jules Sylvain
- Production company: Fribergs Filmbyrå
- Distributed by: Fribergs Filmbyrå
- Release date: 26 December 1938
- Running time: 85 minutes
- Country: Sweden
- Language: Swedish

Good Friends and Faithful Neighbours (Swedish: Goda vänner och trogna grannar) is a 1938 Swedish comedy film co-written and directed by Weyler Hildebrand and starring Ludde Gentzel, Greta Almroth and Eric Abrahamsson. It was shot at the Råsunda Studios in Stockholm. The film's sets were designed by the art director Arne Åkermark.

== Cast ==
- Ludde Gentzel as Ludvig Ask
- Greta Almroth as Laura Ask
- Eric Abrahamsson as Erik Jerker Karlsson
- Ruth Weijden as Kristina Karlsson
- Marianne Aminoff as Greta Ask
- Kotti Chave as Arne Karlsson
- Bror Bügler as Henrik Norling
- Olle Hilding as Emil Norling
- Olav Riégo as Mr. Morton
- Hilda Castegren as Rosa
- Richard Lund as Gebel
- Magnus Kesster as John
- Wiktor Andersson as Nisse Klöver
- Manne Grünberger as Pelle
- Nils Jacobsson as Fast
- Millan Bolander as Mrs. Mallander
- Vera Lindby as Viola, Greta's friend
- Gunnar Höglund as Kalle, Greta's brother
- Helga Brofeldt as Mrs. Johansson, woman at the sale
- Ingrid Envall as Girl
- Siri Olson as Shop clerk
- Anna-Stina Wåglund as Shop clerk

== Bibliography ==
- Wallengren, Ann-Kristin. Welcome Home Mr Swanson: Swedish Emigrants and Swedishness on Film. Nordic Academic Press, 2014.
