= Wife for a Day =

1933 film

- Directed by: Gösta Rodin
- Written by: Torsten Lundqvist; Gösta Rodin
- Starring: Aina Rosén; Erik Berglund; Tollie Zellman
- Cinematography: Adrian Bjurman
- Edited by: Adrian Bjurman
- Music by: Karl Wehle
- Production company: Publikfilm
- Distributed by: Publikfilm
- Release date: 11 February 1933
- Running time: 81 minutes
- Country: Sweden
- Language: Swedish

Wife for a Day (Swedish: Hustru för en dag) is a 1933 Swedish comedy film directed by Gösta Rodin and starring Aina Rosén, Erik Berglund and Tollie Zellman. It was shot at studios in the Segeltorp suburb of Stockholm.

== Synopsis ==
In order to secure an inheritance from his aunt, a man needs to find a woman to pretend to be his wife for a day.

== Cast ==
- Aina Rosén as Ingrid
- Greta Tegnér as Karin
- Erik Berglund as Svensson
- Tollie Zellman as Aunt Eufemia Wall
- Nils Ohlin as Richard Wall
- Rune Carlsten as Brylander
- Olle Hilding as Benjamin
- Ruth Stevens as Divorcée
- Åke Uppström as Knutte

== Bibliography ==
- Larsson, Mariah & Marklund, Anders. Swedish Film: An Introduction and Reader. Nordic Academic Press, 2010.
- Wright, Rochelle. The Visible Wall: Jews and Other Ethnic Outsiders in Swedish Film. SIU Press, 1998.
