= Weyler Hildebrand =

Swedish actor

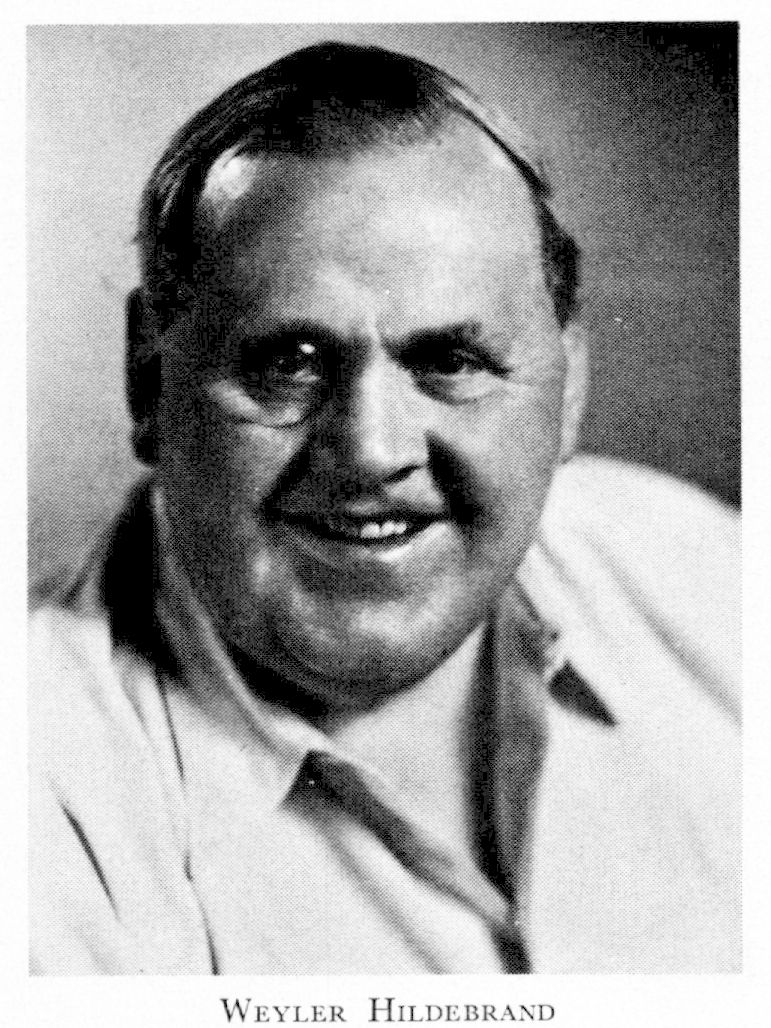
- Born: 4 January 1890; Västervik, Sweden
- Died: 17 November 1944 (aged 54); Solna, Sweden
- Occupations: Actor, film director, writer
- Years active: 1911–1944

Weyler Hildebrand (4 January 1890 – 17 November 1944) was a Swedish actor, film director and writer. He appeared in over 35 films between 1924 and 1944. He also directed over 20 films between 1932 and 1944 and wrote scripts to 30 films between 1925 and 1944.

== Selected filmography ==
- The Ghost Baron (1927)
- Black Rudolf (1928)
- Gustaf Wasa (1928)
- Artificial Svensson (1929)
- The People of Norrland (1930)
- Cavaliers of the Crown (1930)
- Skipper's Love (1931)
- The False Millionaire (1931)
- Colourful Pages (1931)
- Ship Ahoy! (1931)
- Jolly Musicians (1932)
- The Southsiders (1932)
- Fridolf in the Lion's Den (1933)
- Andersson's Kalle (1934)
- Simon of Backabo (1934)
- Munkbrogreven (1935)
- He, She and the Money (1936)
- Conscientious Objector Adolf (1936)
- 65, 66 and I (1936)
- Hotel Paradise (1937)
- The Andersson Family (1937)
- Klart till drabbning (1937)
- Adolf Strongarm (1937)
- Oh, Such a Night! (1937)
- Just a Bugler (1938)
- The Great Love (1938)
- Good Friends and Faithful Neighbours (1938)
- Whalers (1939)
- Landstormens lilla Lotta (1939)
- Nothing But the Truth (1939)
- Kyss henne! (1940)
- Goransson's Boy (1941)
- Dunungen (1941)
- Fröken Vildkatt (1941)
- Löjtnantshjärtan (1942)
- My People Are Not Yours (1944)
- Lilla helgonet (1944)
