= Einar Fagstad =

Norwegian-Swedish accordionist

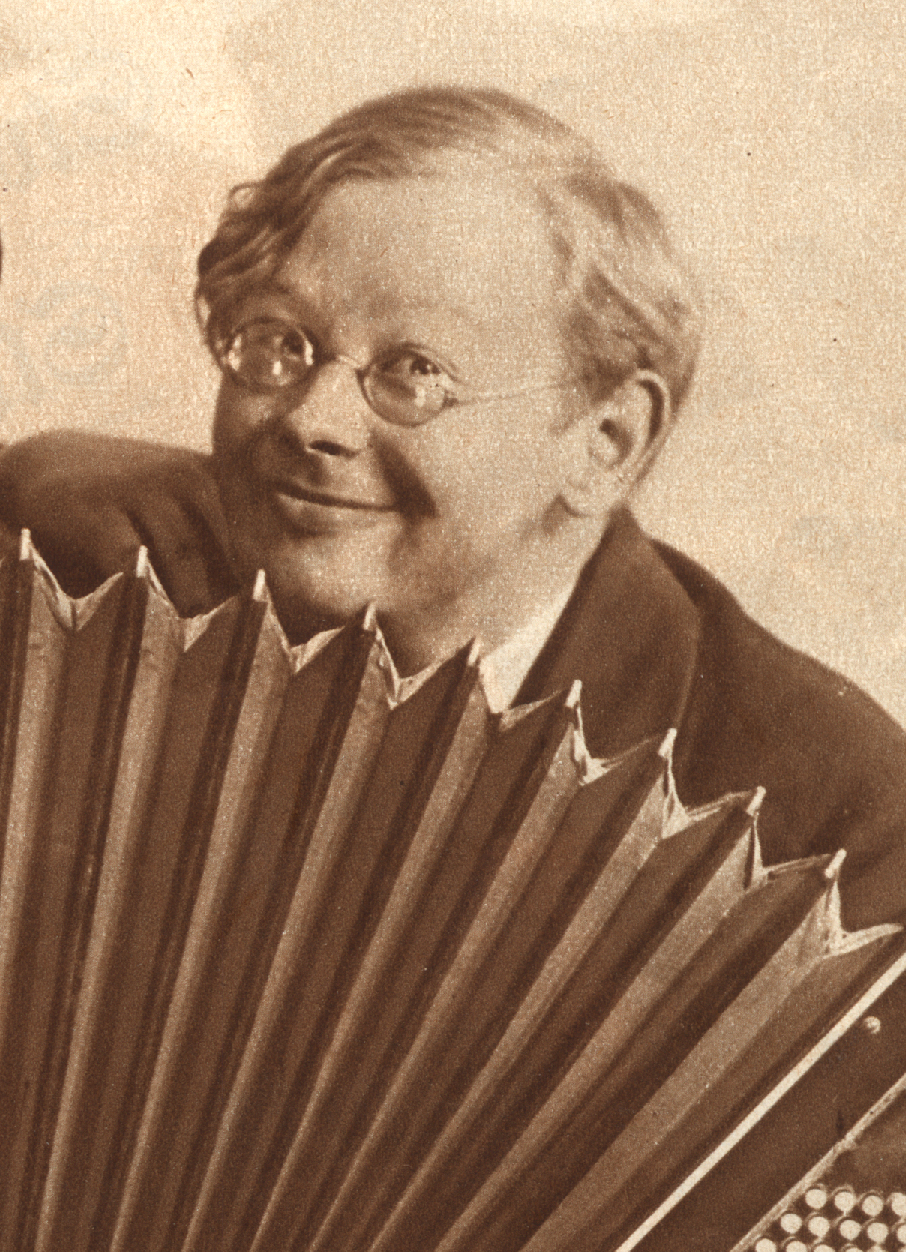
From theatre programme for Rolfs Revy 1931, performed in Stockholm 1931

Einar Fagstad (30 October 1899 – 19 February 1961) was a Norwegian–Swedish accordionist, singer, actor and composer.

Fagstad was born in Lillehammer and began playing the accordion at the age of four. He trained as a painter and studied at the Norwegian National Academy of Craft and Art Industry (1916–1917). He was employed as an accompanist from 1923 by Ernst Rolf who produced a series of musical revues. Fagstad made his film debut in 1929 under the direction of Gustaf Edgren (1895–1954) in Swedish movie Konstgjorda Svensson .

Fagstad was married to actress Gertie Löwenström (1898–1982). He died in Gothenburg.

== Film music ==
- Skipper's Love (1931)

== Selected filmography ==
- 40 Skipper Street (1925)
- Ship Ahoy! (1931)
- A Night of Love by the Öresund (1931)
- Servant's Entrance (1932)
- Love and Dynamite (1933)
- Vi som går kjøkkenveien (1933)
- Andersson's Kalle (1934)
- Ryska snuvan (1937)
- Valfångare (1939)
- The Jazz Boy (1958)
- The Koster Waltz (1958)
