= Whalers (film) =

1939 film

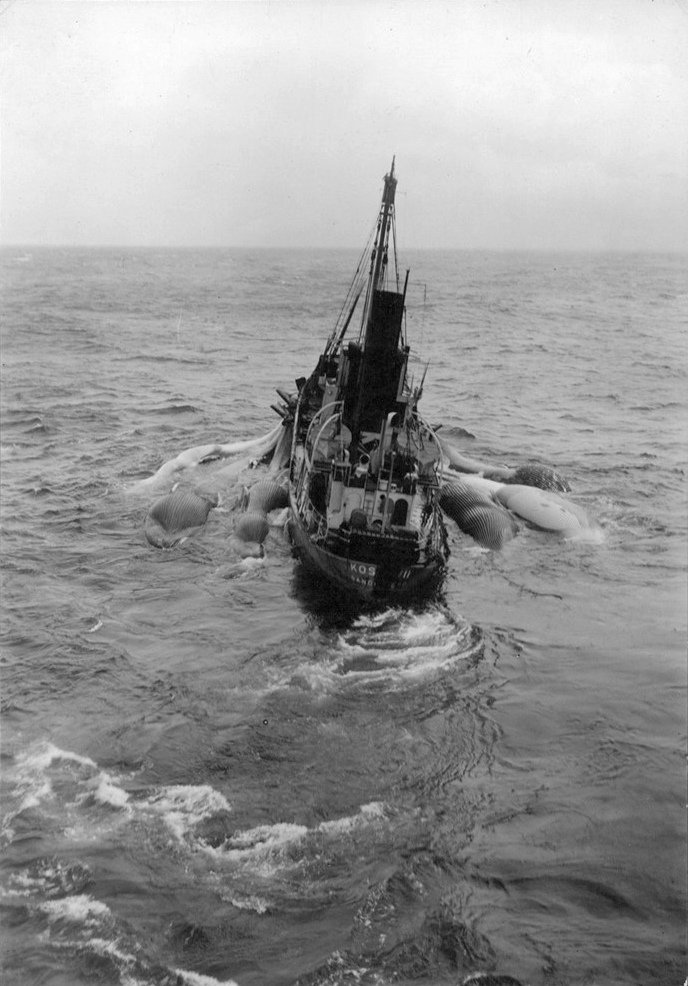
- Still from the film
- Directed by: Anders Henrikson; Tancred Ibsen
- Written by: Weyler Hildebrand; Torsten Lundqvist
- Produced by: Stellan Claësson
- Starring: Allan Bohlin; Tutta Rolf; Oscar Egede-Nissen
- Cinematography: Martin Bodin; Gunnar Fischer; Julius Jaenzon; Per G. Jonson
- Edited by: Oscar Rosander
- Music by: Jules Sylvain; Gunnar Johansson
- Production company: AB Svensk Filmindustri
- Distributed by: Svensk Filmindustri
- Release date: 23 August 1939
- Running time: 80 minutes
- Country: Sweden
- Language: Swedish

Whalers (Swedish: Valfångare) is a 1939 Swedish drama film directed by Anders Henrikson and Tancred Ibsen and starring Allan Bohlin, Tutta Rolf, and Hauk Aabel. It was Rolf's final film.

The film's sets were designed by the art director Arne Åkermark.

== Synopsis ==
The Swedish captain, Allan Bohlin gives passage to Tutta Rolf, who is the daughter of the ship's owner, Hauk Aabel. At this point, the chief mate, Oscar Egede-Nissen, becomes jealous and puts the Swede onto the Norwegian whaling ship Kosmos II, which is heading for the Southern Ocean, with Karl Holter as captain. On board, the two fight.

== Cast ==
- Allan Bohlin as Allan Blom
- Tutta Rolf as Sonja Jensen
- Oscar Egede-Nissen as Olav Lykke
- Hauk Aabel as Jensen Sr.
- Karl Holter as Captain of Kosmos II
- Artur Rolén as Nisse
- Erik 'Bullen' Berglund as Mr. Blom
- Arthur Barking as Store-Knut
- Georg Løkkeberg as Lieutenant
- Lilleba Bouchette as Solveig
- Torsten Hillberg as Captain
- Johan Hauge as Priest
- Carl-Gunnar Wingård as Cook
- Titus Vibe-Müller as Jensen Jr.
- Gunnar Höglund as Knut
- Arthur Fischer as Leif
- Magnus Kesster as Alfred

== Bibliography ==
- Hans J. Wollstein. Strangers in Hollywood: the History of Scandinavian Actors in American Films from 1910 to World War II. Scarecrow Press, 1994.
