= Emil Fjellström =

Swedish actor (1884–1944)

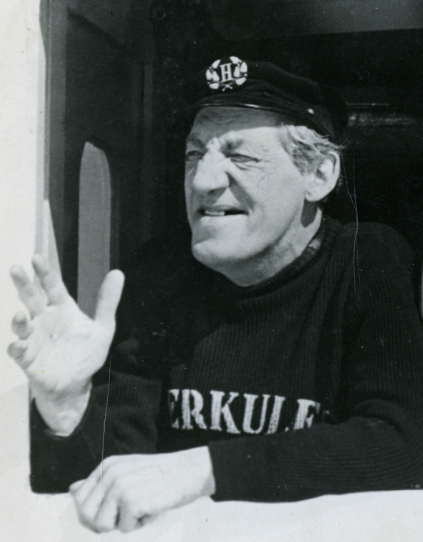
- Born: October 24, 1884; Östersund, Sweden
- Died: July 14, 1944 (aged 59); Stockholm, Sweden
- Occupation: Actor
- Years active: 1906–1944
- Spouse: Millan Fjellström (1913–1944)

Emil Fjellström (24 October 1884 – 14 July 1944) was a Swedish stage and film actor.

== Early life and stage career ==
Emil Fjellström was born in Näs parish, Östersund Municipality, Jämtland County and grew up in the city of Östersund. After finishing school, he briefly worked at the post office before joining a local theater revue. He then decided to pursue theater acting as a professional career and debuted at Anton Salmson's Operetta Theatre in 1906. He would travel extensively through the country in various touring theater companies throughout the early 1900s and 1910s and enjoy a measure of popularity in the provinces.

== Film career ==
Fjellström would make his film debut in the 1917 Gustaf Molander-penned, Mauritz Stiller-directed comedy Thomas Graals bästa film starring Victor Sjöström and Karin Molander, and appear in over 50 films between 1917 and his death in 1944. He was most often cast in comedic roles in film and character roles where he played rather stern but affectionate characters. Three films, 1945's Flickor i hamn, 1949's Hur tokigt som helst, and 1952's Adolf i toppform would be released posthumously.

== Return to the stage ==
While still appearing in films, he would eventually return to the stage in much larger roles at Stockholm's Kristallsalongen, Berns Theatre, Folk Theatre and the Vanadislundens open air theater and the Municipal Theatre in Gothenburg in the 1930s.

== Personal life ==
In 1913 Fjellström married stage and film actress Emilia "Millan" Fjellström (née Streiffert). The couple would remain married until his death in 1944 at age 59 in Stockholm, Sweden.

== Selected filmography ==
- His Lordship's Last Will (Swedish: Hans nåds testamente), 1919
- Karin Daughter of Ingmar (Swedish: Karin Ingmarsdotter), 1920
- The Monastery of Sendomir (Swedish: Klostret i Sendomir), 1920
- Black Roses (Swedish: Svarta rosor), 1932
- International Match (Swedish: Landskamp), 1932
- What Do Men Know? (Swedish; Vad veta väl männen), 1933
- Secret Svensson (Swedish: Hemliga Svensson), 1933
- Simon of Backabo (Swedish: Simon i Backabo), 1934
- The People of Småland (Swedish: Smålänningar), 1935
- Shipwrecked Max (Swedish: Skeppsbrutne Max), 1936
- The Andersson Family (Swedish: Familjen Andersson), 1937
- Adolf Strongarm (Swedish: Adolf Armstarke), 1937
- The Pale Count (Swedish: Bleka greven), 1937
- A Cruise in the Albertina (Swedish: På kryss med Albertina), 1938
- Comrades in Uniform (Swedish: Kamrater i vapenrocken), 1938
- Storm Over the Skerries (Swedish: Storm över skären), 1938
- Thunder and Lightning (Swedish: Blixt och dunder), 1938
- The Three of Us (Swedish: Vi tre), 1940
- A Real Man (Swedish: Karl för sin hatt), 1940
- Woman on Board (Swedish: En kvinna ombord), 1941
- Fransson the Terrible (Swedish: Fransson den förskräcklige), 1941
- Lasse-Maja, 1941
- The Ghost Reporter (Swedish: Spokreportern), 1941
- The Talk of the Town (Swedish: Det sags pa stan), 1941
- Tomorrow's Melody (Swedish: Morgondagens melodi), 1942
- The Heavenly Play (Swedish: Himlaspelet), 1942
- Men of the Navy (Swedish: Örlogsmän), 1943
- In Darkest Smaland (Swedish: I mörkaste Småland), 1943
- The Royal Hunt, (Swedish: Kungajakt), 1944
- The People of Hemsö (Swedish: Hemsöborna), 1944
- With You in My Arms (Swedish: Med dej i mina arma), 1945
