= Filmstaden =

Film studio in Solna, Sweden

Coordinates: 59°22′01″N 17°58′54″E

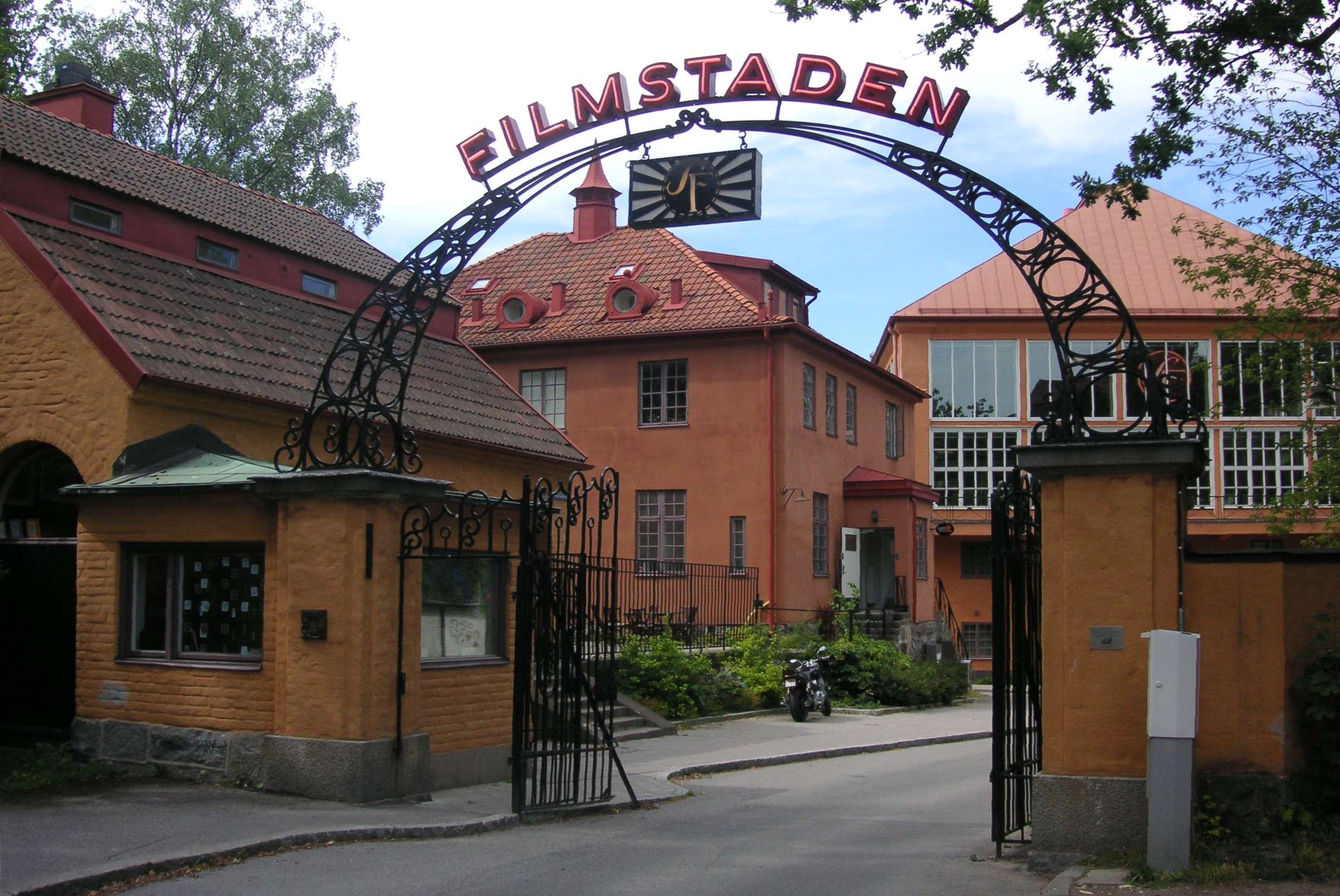
Filmstaden main gate (2008)

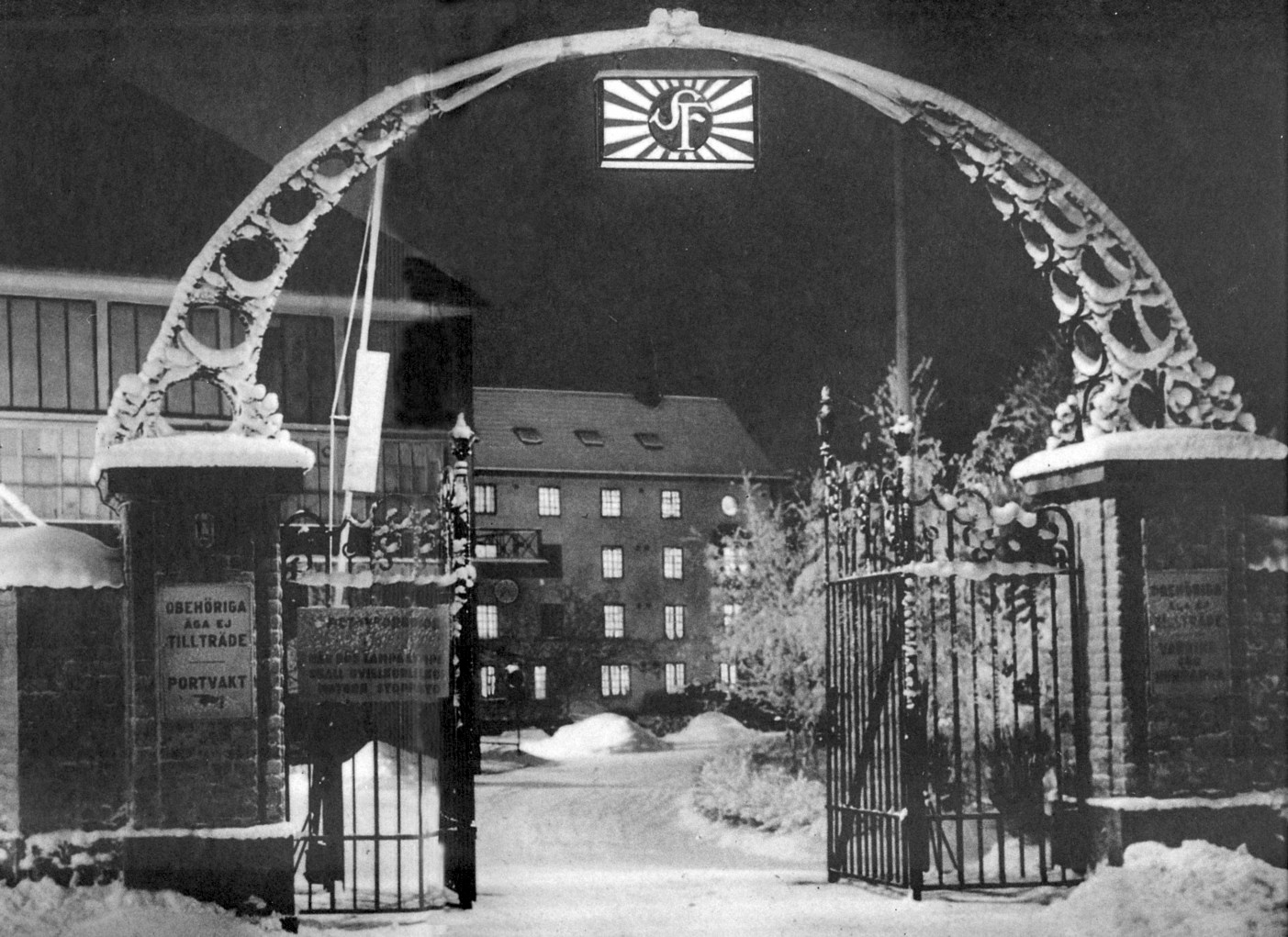
Filmstaden main gate (c.1925)

Filmstaden was a film studio situated in Råsunda, Solna Municipality in Stockholm, Sweden.

== History ==
Filmstaden was once one of the most modern film studios in Europe. It was built in 1919–1920 based on designs by Swedish architect Ebbe Crone (1885-1960). It was owned and operated by SF Studios (Svensk Filmindustri), the main Swedish film producer at the time. Some 400 movies have been created at Filmstaden. The first movie to be filmed at Filmstaden was The Phantom Carriage (Körkarlen. 1921) by director Victor Sjöström. Practically all Swedish actors and film directors of the 20th century had some connection with Filmstaden. In 1969, Svensk Filmindustri left Filmstaden and the studios were used by small film producers, production of television dramas and the Riksteatern Theatre. One of the last major films to partly have been filmed at Filmstaden was The Emigrants (Utvandrarna. 1971) directed by Jan Troell. Most of the buildings were quite well preserved until the beginning of the 21st century, when Filmstaden had to make way for a housing development. However, some buildings have been renovated and SF Studios has moved its headquarters back into a former studio building.

== Other sources ==
- Birkeland, Anders (2000) Filmstaden 1919-2000 (Stockholm: Streiffert) ISBN 91-7886-217-5
