= Eivor Engelbrektsson =

Swedish actress

- Born: Eivor Viola Elvira Engelbrektsson; 4 September, 1914; Stockholm
- Died: February 28, 2004 (aged 89); Kungsholms församling, Stockholm
- Other name: Eivor Karen
- Spouse(s): Sten Broman (1949–1952); Rudolph Kazen (1959–1990)

Eivor Viola Elvira Engelbrektsson (4 September 1914 – 28 February 2004), was a Swedish actress.

Eivor Engelbrektsson was born in Stockholm and was mainly engaged as a revue actress. She toured with the national theater in both singing and speaking roles. She made her film debut in 1931 in Paul Merzbach's Falska miljonären, and appeared in roughly 45 films. From 1949 to 1952 she was married to Sten Broman, and in 1959 she married British businessman Rudolph Kazen (1907–1990).

She died in Kungsholms församling, and is buried at Skogskyrkogården, Stockholm.

== Filmography ==
Year	Movie	Refs
1931	Falska miljonären	
1932	International Match	
1932	Jag gifta mig – aldrig	
1932	Modern Wives	
1932	Jolly Musicians	
1933	Boman's Boy	
1933	What Do Men Know?	
1934	Fired	
1934	Fasters millioner	
1934	The Song to Her	
1935	Under False Flag	
1935	Adventure in Pyjamas	
1936	Poor Millionaires	
1937	Conflict	
1937	Adolf Strongarm	
1938	Adolf Saves the Day	
1938	Styrman Karlssons flammor	
1939	Frun tillhanda	
1939	Only One Night	
1939	Då länkarna smiddes	
1940	Med dej i mina armar	
1940	Her Melody	
1940	One, But a Lion!	
1940	Gentleman att hyra	
1941	Fransson the Terrible	
1941	Tonight or Never	
1941	Only a Woman	
1941	Lärarinna på vift	
1942	Livet på en pinne	
1943	I dag gifter sig min man	
1943	Imprisoned Women	
1943	There's a Fire Burning	
1943	Gentleman with a Briefcase	
1943	Som du vill ha mej	
1944	The Green Lift	
1944	Appassionata	
1945	Motherhood	
1948	Kärlek, solsken och sång	
1948	Kvinnan gör mig galen	
1949	Playing Truant	
1949	Gatan	
1952	Blondie, Beef and the Banana	
1952	Adolf i toppform	
1953	Unmarried Mothers	
1955	Paradise	
1956	Flamman	

== Theater ==
Year	Role	Production	Director	Theater
1936	Marie	Kloka gubben Paul Sarauw	Sigurd Wallén	Södra Teatern
1937	Amalia Lund	Här kommer jag Axel Frische and Fleming Lynge	Ragnar Klange	Folkets hus teater
1940		Charley's Aunt; Brandon Thomas	Leif Amble-Naess	Södra teatern, moved to Vasateatern
1941		Äventyr på fotvandring Jens Christian Hostrup	Nils Johannisson	National Swedish Touring Theatre
1943		Roberta; Jerome Kern och Otto Harbach	Leif Amble-Naess	Oscarsteatern
1948	Laura Belinder	Gröna hissen Avery Hopwood	Martha Lundholm	Vasateatern
1949	Medverkande	Om ni behagar, revue Charles Henry, Harry Iseborg and Karl-Ewert	Werner Ohlson	Odeonteatern, Stockholm
1954	Medverkande	Arsenik åt alla spetsar, revue Rune Moberg	Gösta Jonsson	Boulevardteatern
