= Synnøve Solbakken =

Synnøve Solbakken or Synnöve Solbakken may refer to:

== Novel ==
- Synnøve Solbakken (novel), 1857 Norwegian peasant novel by Bjørnstjerne Bjørnson

== Films based on the novel ==
- Synnöve Solbakken (1919 film), Swedish silent film
- Synnöve Solbakken (1934 film), Swedish film
- Synnöve Solbakken (1957 film), Swedish film

== Other ==
- Synnøve Solbakken (politician) (born 1957), Norwegian politician
