= The Magnificent Lie =

The Magnificent Lie may refer to:

- The Magnificent Lie (1931 film), American film
- The Magnificent Lie (1955 film), Swedish film
