= Börje Larsson (director) =

Swedish film director

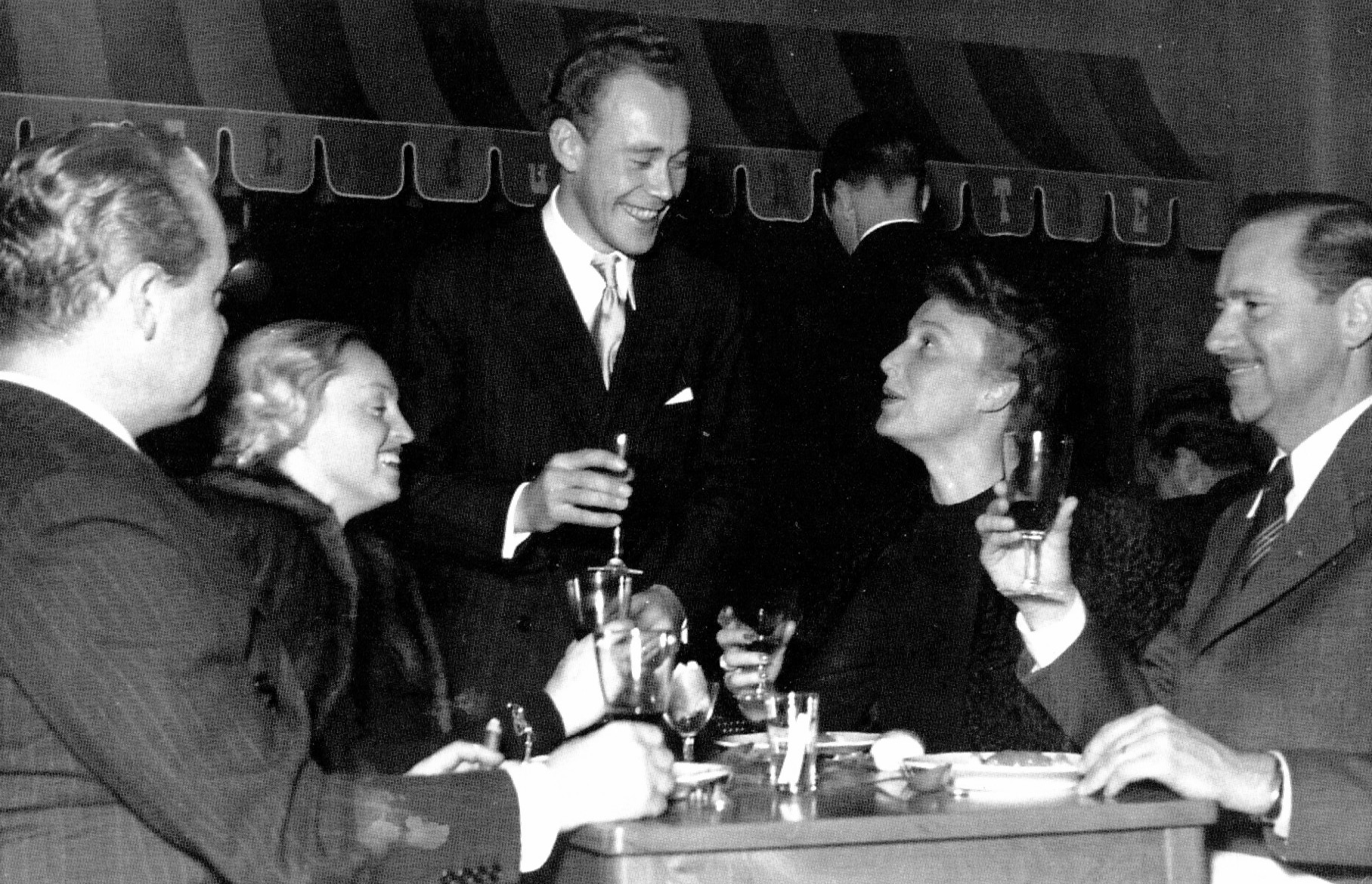
- Larsson (right) with Tore Wretman and Max Hansen in 1945.
- Born: 16 February 1910; Katrineholm, Sweden
- Died: 19 January 1982 (aged 71); Sweden
- Occupations: Director, Writer
- Years active: 1933-1965 (film)

Börje Larsson (1910–1982) was a Swedish screenwriter and film director. He was married to the screenwriter and costume designer Linda Larsson, who co-wrote three screenplays with him.

== Selected filmography ==
- Two Men and a Widow (1933)
- It Pays to Advertise (1936)
- Shipwrecked Max (1936)
- The Ghost of Bragehus (1936)
- Unfriendly Relations (1936)
- Poor Millionaires (1936)
- Happy Vestköping (1937)
- Career (1938)
- Comrades in Uniform (1938)
- Tonight or Never (1941)
- Lärarinna på vift (1941)
- Poor Ferdinand (1941)
- It Is My Music (1942)
- Men of the Navy (1943)
- A Girl for Me (1943)
- The Green Lift (1944)
- Between Brothers (1946)
- The Saucepan Journey (1950)
- The Green Lift (1952)
- Taxi 13 (1954)
- Laugh Bomb (1954)
- Flicka i kasern (1955)
- The Dance Hall (1955)
- Åsa-Nisse på Mallorca (1962)
- Åsa-Nisse och tjocka släkten (1963)
- Sten Stensson Returns (1963)

== Bibliography ==
- Gustafsson, Fredrik. The Man from the Third Row: Hasse Ekman, Swedish Cinema and the Long Shadow of Ingmar Bergman. Berghahn Books, 2016.
- Nelmes, Jill & Selbo, Jule. Women Screenwriters: An International Guide. Palgrave Macmillan, 2015.
- Wallengren, Ann-Kristin. Welcome Home Mr Swanson: Swedish Emigrants and Swedishness on Film. Nordic Academic Press, 2014.
