= Gustaf Wallenberg =

Gustaf Wallenberg may refer to:

- Gustaf Wally (1905–1966), real name Gustaf Wallenberg, actor and theatre manager
- Gustaf Wallenberg (diplomat) (1863–1937), Swedish diplomat
