= Hedengran =

Hedengran is a surname. Notable people with the surname include:

- Solveig Hedengran (1910–1956), Swedish actress
- Thomas Hedengran, Swedish actor
