= Illustreret Folkeblad =

Norwegian weekly newspaper

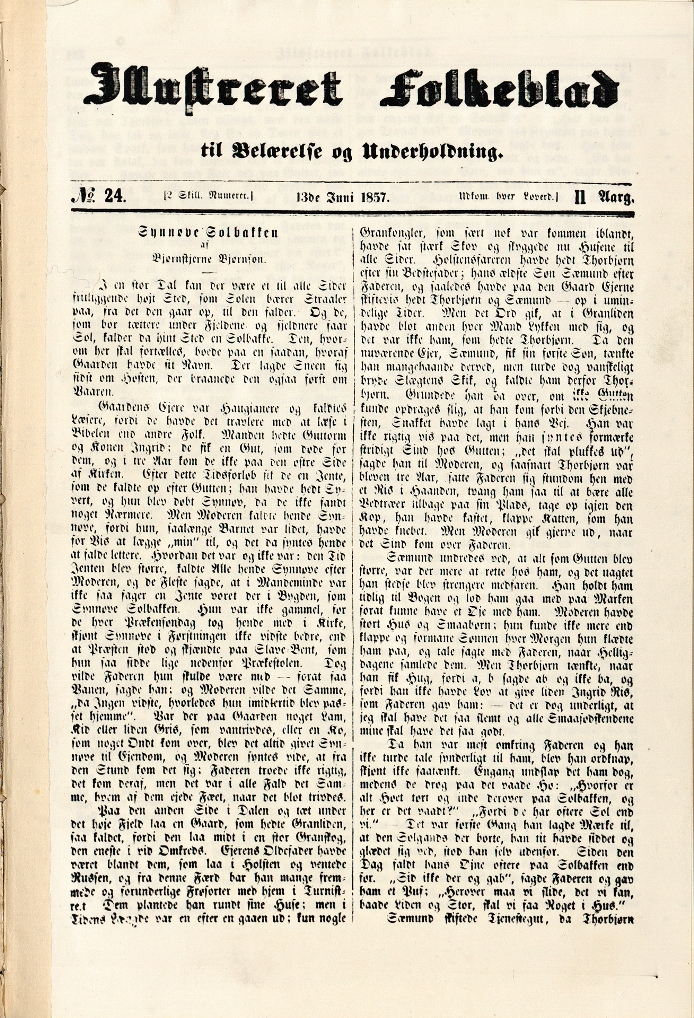
The first installment of Synnøve Solbakken, published in Illustreret Folkeblad on June 13, 1857

Illustreret Folkeblad (The Illustrated People's News) was a newspaper published in Norway from 1856 to 1858.

The newspaper was published weekly, and it bore the subtitle til Belærelse og Underholdning 'for education and entertainment'. Bjørnstjerne Bjørnson was the founder and editor of the paper, and he had several of his first peasant stories printed in it. Among these, Synnøve Solbakken, which was printed in Illustreret Folkeblad in 1857, is particularly noteworthy.

Publications by Bjørnson that appeared in the newspaper include: Aanun, Et farligt frieri (A Dangerous Courtship), Om Dands, Sang, Kortspil, Felespil og anden Morskab (Dancing, Singing, Card Games, Fiddling, and Other Amusements), Ole Stormoen, En munter Mand (A Cheerful Man; incomplete), and Synnøve Solbakken.
