= Gösta Cederlund =

Swedish actor (1888–1980)

- Born: 6 March 1888; Stockholm, Sweden
- Died: 4 December 1980 (aged 92)
- Years active: 1907–1975
- Spouse(s): 1). Ingeborg Elisabeth Magni (1914–1930) (her death); 2). Anna-Lisa Ryding (1932–1980) (his death).

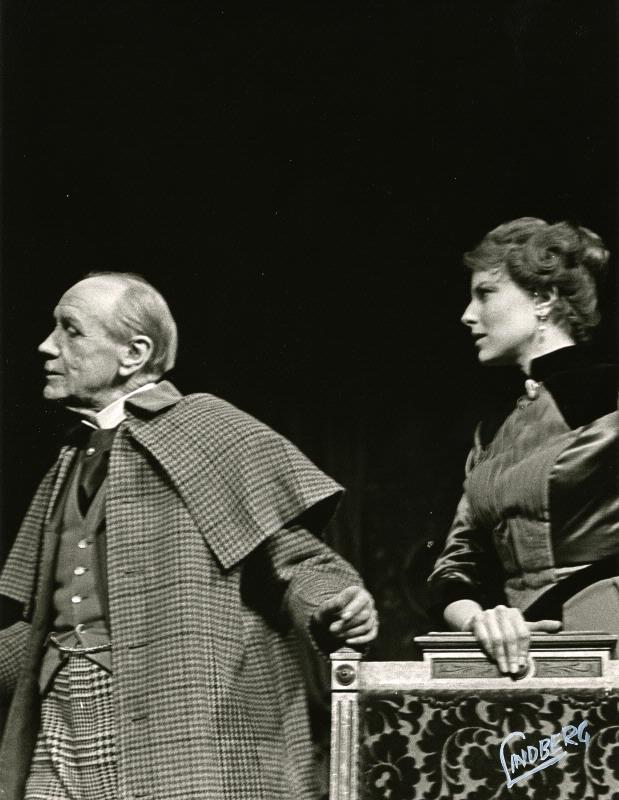
Gösta Cederlund and Kerstin Widgren in Gaslight at Helsingborg's city theater in 1966.

Gösta Cederlund, Gustaf ("Gösta") Edvard Cederlund, (6 March 1888 – 4 December 1980) was a Swedish actor and film director. He was a popular character actor from the 1930s to the 1950s.

He was married actress Anna-Lisa Ryding since 1932 and they were together until his death in 1980.

== Selected filmography ==
- A Dangerous Wooing (1919)
- Synnöve Solbakken (1919)
- Thora van Deken (1920)
- The Mill (1921)
- A Wild Bird (1921)
- A Fortune Hunter (1921)
- The Marriage Game (1935)
- Our Boy (1936)
- The Girls of Uppakra (1936)
- Sara Learns Manners (1937)
- Conflict (1937)
- Dollar (1938)
- Art for Art's Sake (1938)
- A Woman's Face (1938)
- Comrades in Uniform (1938)
- Career (1938)
- Oh, What a Boy! (1939)
- Her Little Majesty (1939)
- Mot nya tider (1939)
- Circus (1939)
- The Two of Us (1939)
- Between Us Barons (1939)
- Wanted (1939)
- They Staked Their Lives (1940)
- Heroes in Yellow and Blue (1940)
- A Real Man (1940)
- The Three of Us (1940)
- Her Melody (1940)
- A Crime (1940)
- Fransson the Terrible (1941)
- How to Tame a Real Man (1941)
- The Yellow Clinic (1942)
- The Case of Ingegerd Bremssen (1942)
- Dangerous Ways (1942)
- The Brothers' Woman (1943)
- Kungsgatan (1943)
- Som du vill ha mej (1943)
- Torment (1944)
- Stopp! Tänk på något annat (1944)
- Motherhood (1945)
- The Serious Game (1945)
- While the Door Was Locked (1946)
- It Rains on Our Love (1946)
- The Bells of the Old Town (1946)
- While the Door Was Locked (1946)
- Meeting in the Night (1946)
- The Sixth Commandment (1947)
- The Girl from the Marsh Croft (1947)
- Each to His Own Way (1948)
- Private Bom (1948)
- A Swedish Tiger (1948)
- Vagabond Blacksmiths (1949)
- Playing Truant (1949)
- Girl with Hyacinths (1950)
- Teacher's First Born (1950)
- Perhaps a Gentleman (1950)
- Valley of Eagles (1951)
- My Name Is Puck (1951)
- In the Arms of the Sea (1951)
- The Chieftain of Göinge (1953)
- The Road to Klockrike (1953)
- All the World's Delights (1953)
- The Red Horses (1954)
- Mord, lilla vän (1955)
- Darling of Mine (1955)
- Getting Married (1955)
- Night Light (1957)
- Woman in a Fur Coat (1958)
- Heart's Desire (1960)
- The Pleasure Garden (1961)
- A Matter of Morals (1961)
