= Circus (1939 film) =

1939 film by George Schnéevoigt

- Directed by: George Schnéevoigt
- Written by: Fleming Lynge; Svend Rindom
- Starring: Carl Ström; Gösta Cederlund; Tollie Zellman
- Cinematography: Valdemar Christensen
- Edited by: Valdemar Christensen
- Music by: Erik Fiehn
- Production company: Nordisk Film
- Distributed by: Nordisk Tonefilm
- Release date: 4 September 1939
- Running time: 100 minutes
- Countries: Denmark; Sweden
- Language: Swedish

Circus (Swedish: Cirkus) is a 1939 Danish-Swedish drama film directed by George Schnéevoigt and starring Carl Ström, Gösta Cederlund and Tollie Zellman. It was shot at the studios of Nordisk Film in Valby.

== Plot summary ==
The famous circus family Bohlin is run by, Magnus Bohlin, also called 'Altmeister'. His son Hjalmar has a daughter, Karin, who is tightrope-dancer, and a son, Ernst, as well as a daughter Olivia, also called 'Ollie.'

A clown trio consisting of brothers Georg and Hasse Jansson and Maurice Dupont is thrown into conflict when Hasse falls in love with the attractive Karin. Hasse abandons the trio to marry Karin and the couple have a son, Alfred. They create their own artist act - a combined clown and dance number. With this, they travel in the world.

However it is not long before that problems begin to emerge within the family relationships. The first crack appears when Georg is going through a struggle in Paris and Karin meets and falls in love with the Swedish neurologist Bengt Stromberg. The situation makes her long for a more stable life than the unpredictability that circus life affords her. Karin divorces Hasse and marries Stromberg and though she begins to live a more regular life in Stockholm, she never stops yearning for her past.

Her son Alfred however, finds the circus magnetic and he runs away to join the Cirkuss Bohlin. Unbeknown to him, his father, Hasse is one of the clowns in the Bohlin circus. As soon as the boy disappears, an alert to find him is broadcast on the radio. Once Alfred is found and Karin and her husband are reunited with Alfred, they realise that ALfred is totally obsessed with working as a clown, true to his own genetic heritage and so the Bohlin circus and its legacy continues.

== Cast ==
- Carl Ström as Magnus Bohlin
- Gösta Cederlund as Hjalmar Bohlin
- Tollie Zellman as Olivia
- Ellen Løjmar as Paula Bohlin
- Nils Kihlberg as Ernst
- Viveka Linder as Karin
- Ragnar Planthaber as Lille Alfredo
- Bror Bügler as Bengt Strömberg
- Henrik Schildt as Oscar Svensson
- Fritiof Billquist as Georg Jansson
- Peter Höglund as Hasse Jansson
- Eric Malmberg as Hollander
- Victor Montell as Maurice Dupont
- Ruth Stevens as Hanna

== Bibliography ==
- Krawc, Alfred. International Directory of Cinematographers, Set- and Costume Designers in Film: Denmark, Finland, Norway, Sweden (from the beginnings to 1984). Saur, 1986.
