= Poor Millionaires (1936 film) =

1936 film

- Directed by: Ragnar Arvedson; Tancred Ibsen
- Written by: Börje Larsson; Ragnar Arvedson; Tancred Ibsen
- Based on: Three Men in the Snow by Erich Kästner
- Produced by: Olof Thiel
- Starring: Adolf Jahr; Anna Olin; Ernst Eklund
- Cinematography: Olle Comstedt
- Edited by: Tancred Ibsen
- Music by: Sune Waldimir
- Production company: AB Irefilm
- Distributed by: AB Anglo Film
- Release date: 21 August 1936
- Running time: 99 minutes
- Country: Sweden
- Language: Swedish

Poor Millionaires (Swedish: Stackars miljonärer) is a 1936 Swedish comedy film directed by Ragnar Arvedson and Tancred Ibsen and starring Adolf Jahr, Anna Olin and Ernst Eklund. The film's sets were designed by the art director Manne Runsten. It is based on the 1934 novel Three Men in the Snow by Erich Kästner.

== Synopsis ==
An unemployed engineer wins a competition, first prize is a vacation to a luxury resort in the mountains.

== Cast ==
- Adolf Jahr as Jan Eriksson
- Anna Olin as Mrs. Eriksson
- Ernst Eklund as Georg Delmar
- Eleonor de Floer as Eva Delmar
- Nils Wahlbom as Johan
- Tollie Zellman as Mrs. Olander
- Olav Riégo as Holm
- Gerda Björne as Wholesalers wife
- Gudrun Brost as Hotel guest
- Carl Browallius as Larsson, clerk
- Eivor Engelbrektsson as Ofelia
- John Ericsson as Lumberer
- Georg Funkquist as Hovén, hotel manager
- Nils Hallberg as Bell boy
- Anna-Lisa Hydén as Hotel guest
- Håkan Jahnberg as Restaurant-keeper
- Nils Johannisson as Wholesaler
- Peggy Lindberg as Emma, cleaning lady
- Holger Löwenadler as Hotel guet wearing pyjama
- Charley Paterson as Manager at publicity department
- Inga-Bodil Vetterlund as Hotel guest
- Carl-Gunnar Wingård as Lövberg, porter

== Bibliography ==
- Larsson, Mariah & Marklund, Anders. Swedish Film: An Introduction and Reader. Nordic Academic Press, 2010.
