= Adventure in Pyjamas =

1935 film

- Directed by: Ragnar Widestedt
- Written by: Sam Ask; Ragnar Widestedt
- Starring: Carl Barcklind; Signe Wirff; Anne-Marie Brunius
- Cinematography: Henrik Jaenzon
- Edited by: Valdemar Christensen
- Music by: Kai Normann Andersen
- Production companies: AB Films; Nordisk Tonefilm
- Distributed by: Nordisk Tonefilm
- Release date: 11 March 1935
- Running time: 69 minutes
- Country: Sweden
- Language: Swedish

Adventure in Pyjamas (Swedish: Äventyr i pyjamas) is a 1935 Swedish comedy film co-written and directed by Ragnar Widestedt and starring Carl Barcklind, Signe Wirff and Anne-Marie Brunius. It was shot at the Valby Studios of Nordisk Film in Copenhagen. The film's sets were designed by the Danish art director Christian Hansen.

== Cast ==
- Carl Barcklind as Harry Anderberg
- Signe Wirff as Julia
- Anne-Marie Brunius as Dagny
- Nils Ohlin as Georg Edfeldt
- Ludde Gentzel as Pehrson
- Olga Hellqvist as Martha
- Carl-Gunnar Wingård as John Brandström
- Inga-Bodil Vetterlund as Signe
- Nils Leander as Carlo
- Eivor Engelbrektsson as Anna

== Bibliography ==
- Krawc, Alfred. International Directory of Cinematographers, Set- and Costume Designers in Film: Denmark, Finland, Norway, Sweden (from the beginnings to 1984). Saur, 1986.
