= Dangerous Ways =

1942 film

- Directed by: Anders Henrikson
- Written by: Ragnar Josephson
- Starring: Karin Ekelund; Georg Rydeberg; Ernst Eklund
- Cinematography: Elner Åkesson
- Edited by: Ragnar Engström
- Music by: Lars-Erik Larsson
- Production company: Centrumfilm
- Distributed by: Svensk Talfilm
- Release date: 26 January 1942
- Running time: 86 minutes
- Country: Sweden
- Language: Swedish

Dangerous Ways (Swedish: Farliga vägar) is a 1942 Swedish drama film directed by Anders Henrikson and starring Henrikson, Karin Ekelund, Georg Rydeberg and Ernst Eklund. The film's sets were designed by the art director Bertil Duroj.

== Synopsis ==
A family of refugees arrive in Stockholm but find life very hard when the father cannot get a work permit and they are short of money. But not all of their problems involve lack of money. The idleness and lack of hope can take them to dangerous paths.

== Cast ==
- Karin Ekelund as Vanja
- Anders Henrikson as Martin
- Georg Rydeberg as Stefan
- Ernst Eklund as Katena
- Hilda Borgström as Anna
- Frank Sundström as Carel
- Maj-Britt Håkansson as Sonja Katena
- Ivar Kåge as Ship Owner
- Gösta Cederlund as Green, Lawyer
- Hjördis Petterson as Hostess
- Torsten Winge as Prant
- Marianne Löfgren as Miss Kahlén
- Carl Barcklind as District Rural Judge
- Josua Bengtson as Stuveriförman
- Astrid Bodin as Waitress
- Gösta Bodin as Klädhandlare
- Siv Ericks as Green's Maid
- John Ericsson as Crew Hand
- David Erikson as Passkontrollant
- Gösta Grip as Tullkontrollant
- Olle Hilding as Prant's Co-worker
- Torsten Hillberg as C.G. Ceder
- Willy Peters as Policeman
- Ragnar Widestedt as Källarmästare

== Bibliography ==
- Qvist, Per Olov & von Bagh, Peter. Guide to the Cinema of Sweden and Finland. Greenwood Publishing Group, 2000.
- Wright, Rochelle. The Visible Wall: Jews and Other Ethnic Outsiders in Swedish Film. SIU Press, 1998.
