= Between Brothers (film) =

1946 film

- Directed by: Börje Larsson
- Written by: Eric Roos
- Starring: Max Hansen; Marianne Aminoff; Vibeke Falk
- Cinematography: Walter Boberg
- Edited by: Eric Nordemar
- Music by: Kai Normann Andersen
- Production company: Sveafilm
- Release date: 18 November 1946
- Running time: 96 minutes
- Country: Sweden
- Language: Swedish

Between Brothers (Swedish: Bröder emellan) is a 1946 Swedish comedy film directed by Börje Larsson and starring Max Hansen, Marianne Aminoff and Vibeke Falk. It was shot at the Centrumateljéerna Studios in Stockholm. The film's sets were designed by the art director Bertil Duroj.

== Synopsis ==
After living apart from each other for many years, Peter returns from America and proceeds to steal his twin brother Patrik's identity while he is in the hospital.

== Cast ==
- Max Hansen as Patrik Brodd / Peter Brodd
- Marianne Aminoff as Ingeborg Brodd
- Vibeke Falk as Birgit Sande
- Åke Grönberg as Bengtsson, driver
- John Botvid as Door-keeper at the hospital
- Hilda Borgström as Karin, maid
- Einar Axelsson as Fagerholm, banker
- Julia Cæsar as Door-keeper's wife
- Arthur Fischer as Perlman, lawyer
- Emy Hagman as Viola, maid
- Ragnar Widestedt as Doctor
- Maj-Lis Lüning as Elsa, nurse
- Inga-Bodil Vetterlund as Secretary
- Gerda Björne as Guest of Brodd
- Alli Halling as Mrs. Fagerholm
- Stig Johanson as Taxi Driver
- Mimi Pollak as Miss Sande
- Inga-Lill Åhström as Nurse
- Brita Öberg as Miss Sande's cleaning-woman

== Bibliography ==
- Qvist, Per Olov & von Bagh, Peter. Guide to the Cinema of Sweden and Finland. Greenwood Publishing Group, 2000.
