= Comrades in Uniform =

1938 film

- Directed by: Schamyl Bauman
- Written by: Börje Larsson; Schamyl Bauman; Oscar Hemberg
- Starring: Gösta Cederlund; Fritiof Billquist; Sigge Fürst
- Cinematography: Olle Comstedt; Willy Goldberger
- Edited by: Rolf Husberg
- Music by: Olof Thiel
- Production company: AB Irefilm
- Distributed by: AB Irefilm
- Release date: 28 January 1938
- Running time: 91 minutes
- Country: Sweden
- Language: Swedish

Comrades in Uniform (Swedish: Kamrater i vapenrocken) is a 1938 Swedish comedy film directed by Schamyl Bauman and starring Gösta Cederlund, Fritiof Billquist and Sigge Fürst. The film's sets were designed by the art director Arthur Spjuth.

== Synopsis ==
Two friends are called up for their military service as conscripts.

== Cast ==
- Gösta Cederlund as Överste Skyller
- Fritiof Billquist as Löjtnant Skanse
- Sigge Fürst as Sergeant Swärd
- Elof Ahrle as Loffe Holm, beväring
- Sture Lagerwall as Pelle Sundin, beväring
- Tord Bernheim as Tage Fredman, beväring
- Henrik Dyfverman as Daniel Lundqvist, beväring
- Tollie Zellman as Laura Fredman
- Annalisa Ericson as Annika Gårdeman
- Nils Hultgren as Manfred
- Solveig Hedengran as Greta
- Anna Lindahl as Sonja
- Axel Högel as Teatervaktmästaren
- Åke Grönberg as Bonzo
- Emil Fjellström as Supply Worker
- Rolf Botvid as Hostile Soldier
- Manne Grünberger as Hostile Soldier
- Frithiof Bjärne as Soldier
- Bellan Roos as Actress
- Hugo Jacobsson as Captain
- Nils Jacobsson as Captain
- Nils Johannisson as Björn Forell
- Ingrid Luterkort as Housemaid at Tuna
- Ragnar Widestedt as Lieutenant

== Bibliography ==
- Qvist, Per Olov & von Bagh, Peter. Guide to the Cinema of Sweden and Finland. Greenwood Publishing Group, 2000.
