= Between Us Barons =

1939 film

- Directed by: Ivar Johansson
- Written by: Rolf Husberg; Ivar Johansson
- Based on: Following Ann by Kenneth R.G. Browne
- Produced by: Lorens Marmstedt
- Starring: Adolf Jahr; Birgit Tengroth; Gösta Cederlund
- Cinematography: Ernst Westerberg
- Edited by: Ivar Johansson
- Music by: Eskil Eckert-Lundin
- Production company: Sandrews
- Release date: 26 December 1939
- Running time: 85 minutes
- Country: Sweden
- Language: Swedish

Between Us Barons (Swedish: Oss baroner emellan) is a 1939 Swedish comedy film directed by Ivar Johansson and starring Adolf Jahr, Birgit Tengroth and Gösta Cederlund. It was inspired by the British novel Following Ann by Kenneth R. G. Browne.

It was shot at the Gärdet Studios in Stockholm. The film's sets were designed by the art director Arthur Spjuth.

== Synopsis ==
A baron returns to Sweden after many years in Argentina. Soon after arriving, his luggage is stolen by a confidence trickster who masquerades as the baron in order to gain an invitation to the estate of a wealthy couple. Things become more complicated when the baron himself turns up, also in disguise.

== Cast ==
- Adolf Jahr as Gustaf Adolf Leijoncloo
- Birgit Tengroth as Inga
- Gösta Cederlund as Hektor Blomqvist
- Tollie Zellman as Agnes, hans hustru
- Elsa Desolneux as Karin, deras dotter
- Thor Modéen as Vilgot Sällberg
- Magnus Kesster as Jönsson-Hammarlöf-Bratt
- Hilding Gavle as Hansson, betjänt
- Gull Natorp as Tant Victoria

== Bibliography ==
- Qvist, Per Olov & von Bagh, Peter. Guide to the Cinema of Sweden and Finland. Greenwood Publishing Group, 2000.
