= Dagmar Edqvist =

Swedish author and screenwriter (1903–2000)

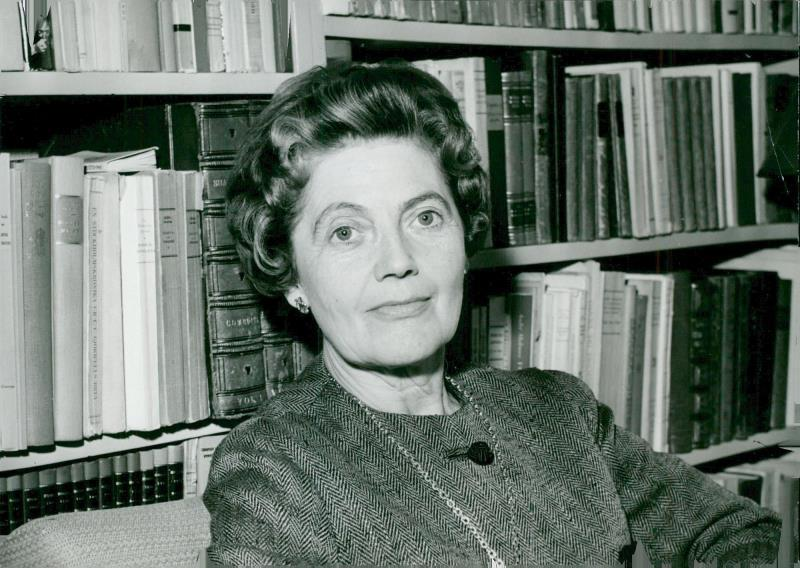
- Dagmar Edqvist
- Born: 20 April 1903; Visby, Sweden
- Died: 21 February 2000 (aged 96); Luleå, Sweden
- Occupations: Author; screenwriter

Dagmar Ingeborg Edqvist (20 April 1903 – 21 January 2000) was a Swedish writer and screenwriter. Best known for her works on women empowerment, her novels have been adapted for film and the stage.

== Early life ==
Dagmar Edqvist was born on 20 April 1903 in Visby, Sweden. She was the daughter of Hermanna Kroksted and Hjalmar Jansson, a lecturer in history. Jansson was also politically active, and served as a town councillor. Edqvist received her education privately and earned her school-leaving certificate in 1922. She married Torgny Edqvist, who was 15 years her senior. At the time, Torgny Edqvist worked as an associate teacher at the Visby school. In 1927, she went to France to continue her studies. In 1932, Edqvist and her husband moved to Malmö, where their daughter Suzanne was born in 1934. Widowed in 1964, she married ethnologist Olof Hasslöf five years later.

== Career ==
Edqvist worked as a secretary at the St Olof hospital in Visby. In 1932, her first novel, Kamrathustru, was published by Bonnier AB. Kamrathustru explored themes on the equal opportunities for women by introducing its protagonist Ebba Garland as an astute, independent, and level-headed character. The book was her first to address women empowerment and feminist issues, and received rapid recognition. During the 1930s, 1940s, and 1950s, she became one of the most read authors in Sweden, and were translated into several languages. Bonnier published 24 novels in this period, releasing almost one novel each year.

Edqvist's works can be classified into three segments. Her earliest novels explored contemporary themes of gender, and role of women as wives, professionals, and friends. Fallet Ingegerd Bremssen, published in 1937, is often regarded as her best known novel. In 1942, it was adapted into a drama film of the same name. Her works from the second era were set in Africa, and were influenced by her off-and-on visits to Tanzania. Among them were Skuggan blir kortare (1958), Den svarta systern (1961), Eldflugorna (1964), and Efter flykten (1977). The third era included historical novels, the first one Trolldryck was published in 1949. Mannen från havet, published in 1967, was set in the Viking and medieval periods. She continued to develop the theme in the next two installments of the series, Mannen som kom hem and Människor på en ö, were published in 1969 and 1971, respectively. The trilogy was later adapted into a play that was performed at the Allan Nilsson-led Länsteater in Gotland.

Edqvist was also known as a screenwriter. She wrote the screenplay for Music in Darkness (1940), En kvinna ombord (1941), Fallet Ingegerd Bremssen (1942), Lianbron (1965). Her novels Kamrathustru, Rymlingen fast, and Musik i mörker have been adapted to films.

== Later years ==
Edqvist died in Luleå in on 21 February 2000.
