= Erik Forslund =

Swedish actor

- Born: 22 October 1878; Stockholm, Sweden
- Died: 12 March 1960 (aged 81); Stockholm, Sweden
- Occupation: Actor
- Years active: 1931–1956

Erik Forslund (22 October 1878 – 12 March 1960) was a Swedish actor. He appeared in more than 70 films between 1931 and 1956.

== Selected filmography ==
- A Stolen Waltz (1932)
- Secret Svensson (1933)
- What Do Men Know? (1933)
- The People of Småland (1935)
- South of the Highway (1936)
- Oh, Such a Night! (1937)
- The People of Bergslagen (1937)
- Fransson the Terrible (1941)
- Lasse-Maja (1941)
- I Am Fire and Air (1944)
- The Emperor of Portugallia (1944)
- Oss tjuvar emellan eller En burk ananas (1945)
- Harald the Stalwart (1946)
- Desire (1946)
- The People of Simlang Valley (1947)
- Kvarterets olycksfågel (1947)
- I Am with You (1948)
- Big Lasse of Delsbo (1949)
