= Nils Wahlbom =

Swedish actor

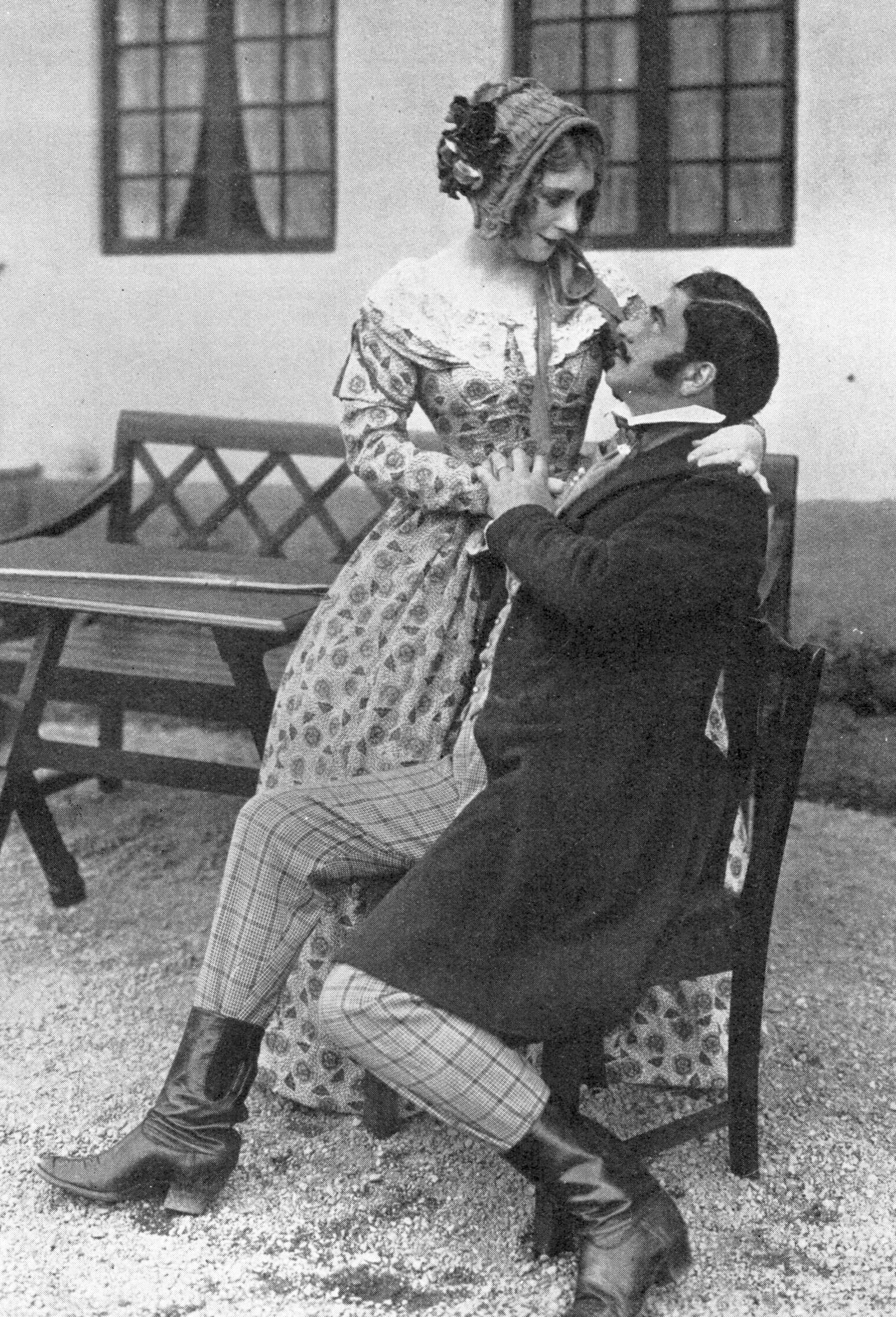
- Nita Hårleman (1891-1961) against Nils Wahlbom (1886-1937) in Country Life at Skansens open air theater.
- Born: 28 October 1886; Stockholm, Sweden
- Died: 24 October 1937 (aged 50); Stockholm, Sweden
- Occupation: Actor
- Years active: 1917-1937 (film)

Nils Wahlbom (October 28, 1886 – October 24, 1937) was a Swedish film actor. He appeared in around forty films including The Women Around Larsson (1934).

== Selected filmography ==
- The Tales of Ensign Stål (1926)
- The Devil and the Smalander (1927)
- Longing for the Sea (1931)
- Mother-in-Law's Coming (1932)
- What Do Men Know? (1933)
- Andersson's Kalle (1934)
- The Women Around Larsson (1934)
- The Atlantic Adventure (1934)
- A Wedding Night at Stjarnehov (1934)
- The Song to Her (1934)
- Kungen kommer (1936)
- Poor Millionaires (1936)
- Raggen (1936)
- Our Boy (1936)
- South of the Highway (1936)
- Adolf Strongarm (1937)
- Happy Vestköping (1937)
- Thunder and Lightning (1938)

== Bibliography ==
- Larsson, Mariah & Marklund, Anders. Swedish Film: An Introduction and Reader. Nordic Academic Press, 2010.
