= Career (1938 film) =

1938 film

- Directed by: Schamyl Bauman
- Written by: Franz Winterstein; Börje Larsson
- Starring: Signe Hasso; Sture Lagerwall; Tollie Zellman
- Cinematography: Hilmer Ekdahl
- Edited by: Rolf Husberg
- Music by: Olof Thiel
- Production company: Irefilm
- Distributed by: Sandrew-Baumanfilm
- Release date: 11 October 1938
- Running time: 106 minutes
- Country: Sweden
- Language: Swedish

Career (Swedish: Karriär) is a 1938 Swedish drama film directed by Schamyl Bauman and starring Signe Hasso, Sture Lagerwall and Tollie Zellman. The film's sets were designed by the art director Erwin Scharf. It follows the members of a touring theatre company in Sweden and the conflicts between the actors and the prima donna.

== Cast ==
- Signe Hasso as Monika Hall
- Sture Lagerwall as Erik Norrby
- Tollie Zellman as Nanny Högfelt
- Carl Barcklind as Ferdinand Sund
- Ruth Stevens as Karin Lund
- Olof Widgren as Helge Berg
- Olof Sandborg as Theater Manager
- Wiola Brunius a s Margit Larsson
- Mona Mårtenson as Actress
- Ludde Gentzel as Johansson
- Ragnar Widestedt as Lindell
- Gösta Cederlund as Malte Brundin Senior
- Sigge Fürst as Bus Driver
- Douglas Håge as Rydman, Theater Manager
- Åke Engfeldt as Malte Brundin Junior
- Hartwig Fock as Man at Railroad Crossing
- Gustaf Färingborg as Pelle Söderström, Actor
- Torsten Hillberg as Man
- Elsa Holmquist as Lena Moberg, Actress
- Bellan Roos as Landlady
- Lillebil Kjellén as Young Woman
- Arne Lindblad as Andersson, Janitor
- Signe Lundberg-Settergren as Landlady
- Aurore Palmgren as Prompter
- Eric von Gegerfelt as Maitre d'
- Birger Åsander as Man in the Audience

== Bibliography ==
- Gustafsson, Fredrik. The Man from the Third Row: Hasse Ekman, Swedish Cinema and the Long Shadow of Ingmar Bergman. Berghahn Books, 2016.
- Hjort, Mette & Lindqvist, Ursula. A Companion to Nordic Cinema. John Wiley & Sons, 2016.
