= Sven Arvor =

Swedish actor

- Born: 26 July 1907
- Died: 16 November 2001

Sven Arvor (26 July 1907 – 16 November 2001) was a Swedish actor best known for his roles in Fröken Julie, Kungliga Johansson and Kvinna utan ansikte.

== Filmography ==
- 1934 – Kungliga Johansson
- 1936 – Johan Ulfstjerna
- 1936 – Janssons frestelse
- 1936 – The Lady Becomes a Maid
- 1936 – Kungen kommer
- 1937 – Familjen Andersson
- 1937 – Klart till drabbning
- 1939 – Filmen om Emelie Högqvist
- 1940 – Stål
- 1942 – Sexlingar
- 1943 – Livet på landet
- 1944 – Prins Gustaf
- 1944 – Excellensen
- 1944 – Klockan på Rönneberga
- 1944 – Räkna de lyckliga stunderna blott
- 1945 – His Majesty Must Wait
- 1946 – Johansson och Vestman
- 1947 – Stackars lilla Sven
- 1947 – Kvinna utan ansikte
- 1947 – Jens Månsson i Amerika
- 1948 – Banketten
- 1948 – Flottans kavaljerer
- 1949 – Kärleken segrar
- 1949 – Kvinnan som försvann
- 1950 – Frökens första barn
- 1951 – Fröken Julie
- 1955 – The Magnificent Lie
- 1957 – A Guest in His Own House
- 1957 – Mother Takes a Vacation
