= Imprisoned Women =

1943 film

- Directed by: Olof Molander
- Written by: Margit Palmaer; Sven Stolpe
- Produced by: Lorens Marmstedt
- Starring: Gunnar Sjöberg; Elsie Albiin; Gunn Wållgren
- Cinematography: Olle Nordemar
- Edited by: Lennart Wallén
- Music by: Lars-Erik Larsson
- Production company: Terrafilm
- Distributed by: Terrafilm
- Release date: 12 March 1943
- Running time: 99 minutes
- Country: Sweden
- Language: Swedish

Imprisoned Women (Swedish: Kvinnor i fångenskap) is a 1943 Swedish drama film directed by Olof Molander and starring Gunnar Sjöberg, Elsie Albiin and Gunn Wållgren. It was made at the Centrumateljéerna Studios in Stockholm. The film's sets were designed by the art director Bibi Lindström.

== Synopsis ==
A pastor becomes a prison chaplain and encounters a number of woman inmates each of whom have their own life stories.

== Cast ==
- Gunnar Sjöberg as Pastor Brobäck
- Elsie Albiin as Mary
- Gunn Wållgren as Viola
- Hampe Faustman as Roland
- Barbro Hiort af Ornäs as Kaj
- Sigurd Wallén as Fängelseläkaren
- Erik Rosén as Fängelsedirektören
- Hjördis Petterson as Fånge
- Marianne Löfgren as Fånge
- Hilda Borgström as Fånge
- Vera Valdor as Fånge
- Märta Arbin as Fånge
- Signe Wirff as Föreståndarinnan på skyddshemmet
- Birgitta Arman as Flicka på skyddshemmet
- Ninni Löfberg as Flicka på skyddshemmet
- Maj-Britt Håkansson as Flicka på skyddshemmet
- Marianne Karlbeck as Flicka på skyddshemmet
- Margot Ryding as Fru Brobäck
- Carl Barcklind as Kyrkoherden
- Nina Scenna as Marys mor
- Carl Ström as Violas far
- Olga Appellöf as Violas mor
- Eric Laurent as Överkonstapeln
- Anna-Stina Wåglund as Expedit
- Agda Helin as Expedit
- Åke Claesson as Doctor
- Eivor Engelbrektsson as Office Clerk
- Karl Erik Flens as Roland's Friend
- Georg Funkquist as Otto Winblad
- Nils Hallberg as Fred
- Ingrid Luterkort as Policewoman
- Stina Ståhle as Teacher
- Birger Åsander as Angry Man

== Bibliography ==
- Gustafsson, Fredrik. The Man from the Third Row: Hasse Ekman, Swedish Cinema and the Long Shadow of Ingmar Bergman. Berghahn Books, 2016.
- Hjort, Mette & Lindqvist, Ursula. A Companion to Nordic Cinema. John Wiley & Sons, 2016.
