= Olof Sandborg =

Swedish actor

Olof Sandborg in Op Hoop van Zegen at Östermalmsteatern, 1907

Olof Sandborg (April 30, 1884 in Gothenburg – March 26, 1965 in Stockholm) was a Swedish stage and film actor. He won the Eugene O'Neill Award in 1962.

== Filmography ==
- Blodets röst (1913)
- Lady Marions sommarflirt (1913)
- Svärmor på vift eller Förbjudna vägar (1916)
- Brottmålsdomaren (1917)
- The Doctor's Secret (1930)
- International Match (1932)
- Djurgårdsnätter (1933)
- En melodi om våren (1933)
- Man's Way with Women (1934)
- A Wedding Night at Stjarnehov (1934)
- Andersson's Kalle (1934)
- The Ghost of Bragehus (1936)
- Happy Vestköping (1937)
- Russian Flu (1937)
- Career (1938)
- Only One Night (1939)
- Mot nya tider (1939)
- Hans Nåds testamente (1940)
- The Talk of the Town (1941)
- General von Döbeln (1942)
- Adventurer (1942)
- The Emperor of Portugallia (1944)
- Tired Theodore (1945)
- Simon the Sinner (1954)
- Whoops! (1955)
- The Dance Hall (1955)
- Moon Over Hellesta (1956)
- Night Child (1956)
- The Halo Is Slipping (1957)
- A Dreamer's Journey (1957)
- Miss April (1958)
- On a Bench in a Park (1960)
- Adventures of Nils Holgersson (1962)
- Mysteriet natten till den 25:e (1975)
