= The Chieftain of Göinge =

1953 film

- Directed by: Åke Ohberg
- Written by: August Cederborg (novel); Åke Ohlmarks; Gösta Rybrant
- Produced by: Ragnar Arvedson
- Starring: Edvin Adolphson; Alf Kjellin; Eva Dahlbeck
- Cinematography: Ingvar Borild
- Edited by: Lennart Wallén
- Music by: Erland von Koch
- Production company: Europa Film
- Distributed by: Europa Film
- Release date: 26 December 1953
- Running time: 93 minutes
- Country: Sweden
- Language: Swedish

The Chieftain of Göinge (Swedish: Göingehövdingen) is a 1953 Swedish historical adventure film directed by Åke Ohberg and starring Edvin Adolphson, Alf Kjellin and Eva Dahlbeck. It was shot at the Sundbyberg Studios in Stockholm. The film's sets were designed by the art director Arne Åkermark. It is based on the life of the seventeenth century Danish military commander Svend Poulsen known for leading men from Danish-owned Göinge in Scania.

== Cast ==
- Edvin Adolphson as Svend Poulsen
- Alf Kjellin as Lieutenant Henrik Wrede
- Hjördis Petterson as Maren Juul
- Eva Dahlbeck as Kristina Ulfstand
- Gösta Cederlund as Father Petrus
- Ragnar Arvedson as Baron Corfitz
- Ingrid Thulin as Anna Ryding
- Gunnar Hellström as Lars Paulinus
- Erik Hell as Red Nils
- Elof Ahrle as Sören Luden
- Wiktor Andersson as Lille Mats
- Douglas Håge as Truls Inn-keeper
- Isa Quensel as Black-Elsa
- Bengt Blomgren as Narrator
- Karl Erik Flens as Rebel
- Sven Holmberg as Mickel
- Göran Kjellberg as Truls' second grandchild
- Carl-Uno Larsson as Truls' first grandchild
- Gunvor Pontén as Laundry woman at Vanås
- Gösta Prüzelius as Mårten
- Olav Riégo as Army doctor
- Birger Åsander as Messenger

== Bibliography ==
- Klossner, Michael. The Europe of 1500-1815 on Film and Television: A Worldwide Filmography of Over 2550 Works, 1895 Through 2000. McFarland, 2002.
- Qvist, Per Olov & von Bagh, Peter. Guide to the Cinema of Sweden and Finland. Greenwood Publishing Group, 2000.
