= Olof Thiel =

Swedish film producer and composer

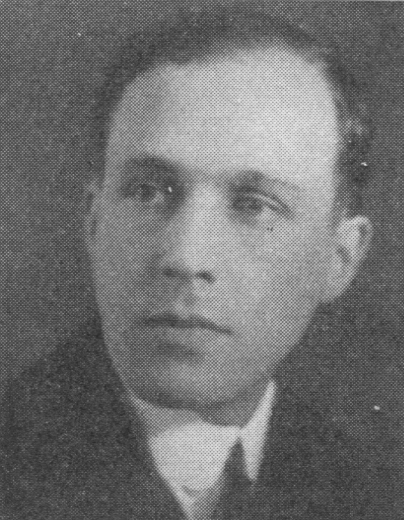
- Born: October 31, 1892; Stockholm, Sweden
- Died: December 10, 1978 (aged 86); Vallentuna, Sweden
- Resting place: Solna Cemetery
- Other names: Jacques Armand
- Spouse: Margareta Lindström
- Children: Madeleine Uggla
- Parents: Ernest Thiel (father); Anna Josephson (mother)
- Relatives: Carin Thiel, Signe Henschen, Lill Thiel

Olof Thiel (October 31, 1892 – December 10, 1978) was a Swedish film producer, film production manager, and composer. As a composer, he most often used the pseudonym "Jacques Armand." He also wrote some of the lyrics to his melodies.

== Family ==
Otto Thiel was the son of Ernest Thiel (1859–1947) and Anna Fredrika Josephson. His father Ernest created the Thiel Gallery (Thielska galleriet) art museum, which is one of the foremost museums in Stockholm. Otto Thiel's daughter Madeleine Uggla was a singing teacher and the mother of the actor Magnus Uggla.

== Career ==
Thiel was one of the directors of the company Filmaktiebolaget Biörnstad & Thiel, and he started the film company AB Irefilm. He composed the music for almost all of Irefilm's film productions.

== Film music (selected) ==
- A Stolen Waltz (1932)
- Fantegutten (1932)
- Flickan från varuhuset (1933)
- Ä' vi gifta? (1936)
- The Ghost of Bragehus (1936)
- Poor Millionaires (1936)
- En sjöman går iland (1937)
- Witches' Night (1937)
- Happy Vestköping (1937)
- En flicka kommer till sta'n (1937)
- Career (1938)
- Comrades in Uniform (1938)

== Films directed ==
- 1934: Synnöve Solbakken
- 1935: Kanske en gentleman
- 1936: Stackars miljonärer
- 1939: Midnattssolens son
