= The Case of Ingegerd Bremssen =

1942 film

- Directed by: Anders Henrikson
- Written by: Dagmar Edqvist
- Based on: The Case of Ingegerd Bremssen by Dagmar Edqvist
- Starring: Sonja Wigert; Anders Henrikson; Dagmar Ebbesen; Gösta Cederlund
- Cinematography: Harald Berglund; Sven Thermænius
- Edited by: Gösta Bjurman; Bengt Palm
- Music by: Nathan Görling
- Production company: Europa Film
- Distributed by: Europa Film
- Release date: 11 March 1942
- Running time: 87 minutes
- Country: Sweden
- Language: Swedish

The Case of Ingegerd Bremssen (Swedish: Fallet Ingegerd Bremssen) is a 1942 Swedish drama film directed by Anders Henrikson and starring Sonja Wigert, Henrikson, Dagmar Ebbesen and Gösta Cederlund. It was based on a 1937 novel of the same title by Dagmar Edqvist. It was shot at the Sundbyberg Studios in Stockholm. The film's sets were designed by the art director Max Linder.

== Synopsis ==
A young nurse Ingegerd Bremssen is assaulted and raped on a lonely road. She is taken to hospital but is extremely traumatised by the attack, and it leads to the breakdown of her engagement with a young army Lieutenant. From a staunchly conservative background she believes her honour has been violated and her life is impossible to rebuild. When she encounters her rapist again she shoots him dead. Placed on trial she is ultimately acquitted thanks to the sympathetic intervention of a psychologist.

== Cast ==
- Sonja Wigert as Ingegerd Bremssen
- Anders Henrikson as Dr. Thomas Arnholm
- Dagmar Ebbesen as Nurse Monica
- Gösta Cederlund as Harald Fors
- Olga Andersson as Mrs. Bremssen
- Marianne Löfgren as Kristin Mårtensson
- Nils Lundell as Lilja
- Georg Rydeberg as Lt. Walter von Baden
- Carl Barcklind as Judge Ericsson
- Ivar Kåge as Chief Physician
- Gunnar Olsson as Nilsson
- Gunnar Sjöberg as Dr. Ivarsson
- Vera Lindby as Hamnbojan
- Ingrid Luterkort as Nurse Kerstin
- Emmy Albiin as Aunt Marie
- Frithiof Bjärne as Hallin
- Birgitta Arman as Nurse
- Ingrid Backlin as Friend of Ingegerd
- Josua Bengtson as Guard
- Ann-Margret Bergendahl as Friend of Ingegerd
- Helga Brofeldt as Woman in court
- Åke Claesson as Procecutor
- Julia Cæsar as Train passenger
- Axel Högel as Train passenger
- Isa Palmgren as Sigrid
- Curt Masreliez as Young Man
- Carl Ström as Doctor
- Siv Thulin as Friend of Ingegerd
- Gerd Mårtensson as Nurse

== Bibliography ==
- Brunsdale, Mitzi M. Encyclopedia of Nordic Crime Fiction: Works and Authors of Denmark, Finland, Iceland, Norway and Sweden Since 1967. McFarland, 2016.
