= Ragnar Widestedt =

Swedish actor and director

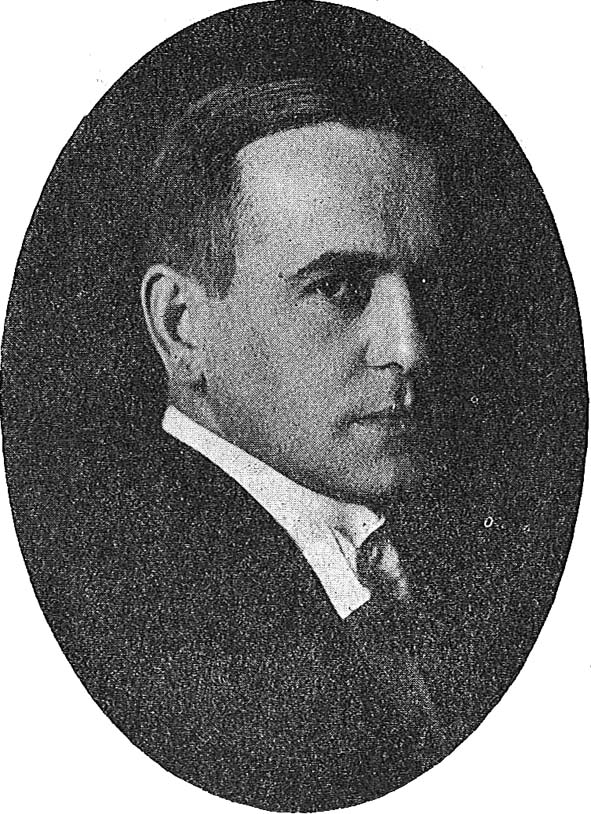
- Widestedt in a 1918 magazine
- Born: 3 May 1887; Njurunda, Sweden
- Died: 4 February 1954 (aged 66); Stockholm, Sweden
- Occupations: Actor, director, singer, composer
- Years active: 1916–1951 (film)

Ragnar Widestedt (3 May 1887 – 4 February 1954) was a Swedish stage and film actor, singer, composer and occasional film director.

== Selected filmography ==
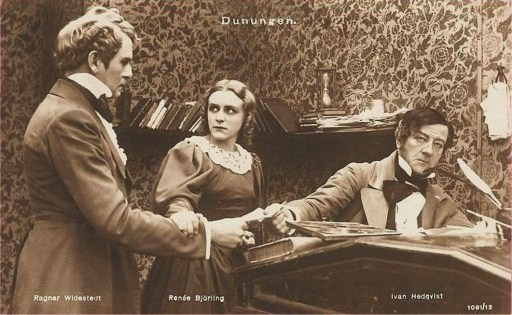
Widestedt (left) in a 1919 film

- House Slaves (1923)
- Skipper's Love (1931)
- A Night of Love by the Öresund (1931)
- Tired Theodore (1931)
- Lucky Devils (1932)
- Secret Svensson (1933)
- House Slaves (1933)
- Kanske en gentleman (1935)
- The Marriage Game (1935)
- Adventure in Pyjamas (1935)
- The Ghost of Bragehus (1936)
- The Andersson Family (1937)
- Adolf Strongarm (1937)
- Career (1938)
- A Cruise in the Albertina (1938)
- Comrades in Uniform (1938)
- Emilie Högquist (1939)
- Mot nya tider (1939)
- The Three of Us (1940)
- Heroes in Yellow and Blue (1940)
- The Crazy Family (1940)
- Lärarinna på vift (1941)
- How to Tame a Real Man (1941)
- Only a Woman (1941)
- Lucky Young Lady (1941)
- The Train Leaves at Nine (1941)
- Life Goes On (1941)
- Tomorrow's Melody (1942)
- It Is My Music (1942)
- Dangerous Ways (1942)
- She Thought It Was Him (1943)
- Gentleman with a Briefcase (1943)
- Mister Collins' Adventure (1943)
- A Girl for Me (1943)
- My People Are Not Yours (1944)
- Between Brothers (1946)

== Bibliography ==
- Freiburg, Jeanne Ellen. Regulatory Bodies: Gendered Visions of the State in German and Swedish Cinema. University of Minnesota, 1994.
- Soila, Tytti. The Cinema of Scandinavia. Wallflower Press, 2005.
