= Elsa Carlsson =

Swedish actress (1892–1978)

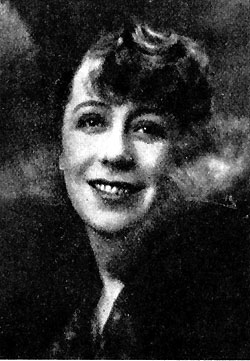
- Born: Elsa Elvira Karlsson; 13 February 1892; Gothenburg, Sweden
- Died: 13 October 1978 (aged 86); Stockholm, Sweden
- Occupation: Actress
- Years active: 1915–1976 (film & TV)
- Relatives: Tora Carlsson (sister)

Elsa Elvira Carlsson, Elsa Elvira Karlsson (13 February 1892 – 13 October 1978) was a Swedish stage and film actress.

== Partial filmography ==
- Nortullsligan (1923) - Girl in sewing circle
- Modern Wives (1932) - Ebba Tallén
- Pettersson & Bendel (1933) - Agda Alvin
- Simon of Backabo (1934) - Mademoiselle Claire de la Meunière (uncredited)
- The Marriage Game (1935) - Polly, hennes väninna
- Conscientious Objector Adolf (1936) - Aunt Maria
- Adventure (1936) - Countess Lagercrona
- 65, 66 and I (1936) - Lisa Pettersson
- The Andersson Family (1937) - Maria Andersson
- Rosor varje kväll (1939) - Mrs. Hyltén
- Oh, What a Boy! (1939) - Mrs. Blomberg
- The Crazy Family (1940) - Fru Laura Blom
- Hanna in Society (1940) - Lucie Hummerberg
- Älskling, jag ger mig (1943) - Annie Carleman
- How to Love (1947) - Ebba Lindgren von Hacken
- The Bride Came Through the Ceiling (1947) - Augustine Lejoncrona
- Banketten (1948) - Agnes
- Fiancée for Hire (1950) - Mrs. Winkler
- The Nuthouse (1951) - Adolf's aunt
- Getting Married (1955) - Emilia
- Egen ingång (1956) - Mrs. Petreus
- Mother Takes a Vacation (1957) - Elisabeth Broms
- Fröken Chic (1959) - Margit van Boren
- The Wedding Day (1960) - Victoria Blom
- Tre önskningar (1960) - Mrs. Anglin
- Do You Believe in Angels? (1961) - The Aunt

== Bibliography ==
- Lars Lofgren. Svensk teater. Natur & Kultur, 2003.
