= Mot nya tider =

1939 film

- Directed by: Sigurd Wallén
- Written by: Gösta Rodin; John Sandén
- Starring: Victor Sjöström; Sigurd Wallén; Bengt Djurberg; Solveig Hedengran
- Cinematography: Hilmer Ekdahl; Karl-Erik Alberts
- Distributed by: Svensk Talfilm
- Release date: November 6, 1939
- Running time: 97 minutes
- Country: Sweden
- Language: Swedish

Mot nya tider (Toward New Times) is a Swedish drama film from 1939 directed by Sigurd Wallén. It portrays the socio-political developments from 1885 until the dissolution of the union between Norway and Sweden in 1905. The film was shot from February to May 1939 at Sandrew Studios (Swedish: Sandrewateljéerna) in Stockholm and in Karlstad, Oslo, and Trondheim.

== Cast ==
- Victor Sjöström as Hjalmar Branting, Swedish politician
- Sigurd Wallén as Kalle Lundgren, a master painter
- Bengt Djurberg as Johan Dahlberg, an engineer
- Solveig Hedengran as Elin Ström
- Gun-Mari Kjellström as Eva, Johan and Elin's daughter as an infant
- Ulla Hodell as Eva as a young girl
- Marianne Aminoff as Eva as an adult
- Karl Holter as Henrik Thygesen, a Norwegian
- Georg Løkkeberg as Christian Thygesen, Henrik's brother, a Norwegian lieutenant / Helge Thygesen as an adult
- Åke Johansson as Helge Thygesen, Christian's son as a child
- Ingela Lundstedt as Sigrid Bergström, Christian Thygesen's fiancé, Helge's mother
- Thor Modéen as Lindqvist
- Ingolf Schanche as Christian Michelsen, Norwegian prime minister
- David Knudsen as Jørgen Løvland, Norwegian minister of foreign affairs
- Leif Amble-Næss as Harald Bothner, Norwegian minister
- Sigval Kvam as Edvard Hagerup Bull, Norwegian minister
- Olof Sandborg as King Oscar II
- Karl-Magnus Thulstrup as Crown Prince Gustav
- Sven Bergvall as Christian Lundeberg, Swedish prime minister
- Ragnar Widestedt as Fredrik Wachtmeister, Swedish foreign minister
- Rune Carlsten as Karl Staaff, Swedish politician
- Arne Lindblad as August Palm, Swedish politician
- Willy Peters as Per Albin Hansson, Swedish politician
- Carl Barcklind as Semmy Rubenson, Stockholm chief of police
- Gösta Cederlund as Governor Curry Treffenberg
- Stina Ståhle as Christina Nilsson, Swedish operatic soprano
- Georg Fernquist as Heinrich Robert Berns, a pastry chef
- Hjalmar Meissner as August Meissner
- Tord Bernheim as Hilding Nihlén, a dandy at Berns Salonger
- Carin Swensson as Hulda Malmström, a Swedish actress
- Carl Apolloff as Viscount António da Cunha Soto Maior, a Portuguese envoy
