= Georg Funkquist =

Swedish actor (1900–1986)

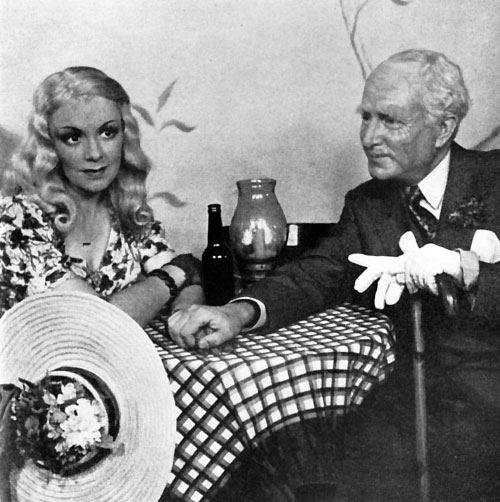
- Isa Quiensel and Georg Funquist in Three Waltzes, 1942
- Born: 13 March 1900; Uppsala, Sweden
- Died: 23 October 1986 (aged 86); Stockholm, Sweden
- Occupation: Actor
- Years active: 1922 – 1977

Georg Funkquist (13 March 1900 – 23 October 1986) was a Swedish film actor. He was born in Uppsala and died in Stockholm.

== Selected filmography ==
- The Red Day (1931)
- Poor Millionaires (1936)
- Mother Gets Married (1937)
- Happy Vestköping (1937)
- Adolf Saves the Day (1938)
- Kalle's Inn (1939)
- We at Solglantan (1939)
- Her Melody (1940)
- The Bjorck Family (1940)
- Home from Babylon (1941)
- Poor Ferdinand (1941)
- Little Napoleon (1943)
- Imprisoned Women (1943)
- There's a Fire Burning (1943)
- We Need Each Other (1944)
- Appassionata (1944)
- Crime and Punishment (1945)
- Affairs of a Model (1946)
- Sunshine (1948)
- Kvinnan bakom allt (1951)
- Summer Interlude (1951)
- Dance in the Smoke (1954)
- The Staffan Stolle Story (1956)
- The Stranger from the Sky (1956)
- Woman in a Fur Coat (1958)
- The Jazz Boy (1958)
- The Devil's Eye (1960)
- All These Women (1964)
