= Teatergrillen =

Restaurant in Stockholm, Sweden

Coordinates: 59°20′1″N 18°4′35.2″E

Teatergrillen is a Swedish restaurant at Nybrogatan 3 in Stockholm. It was started by Tore Wretman.

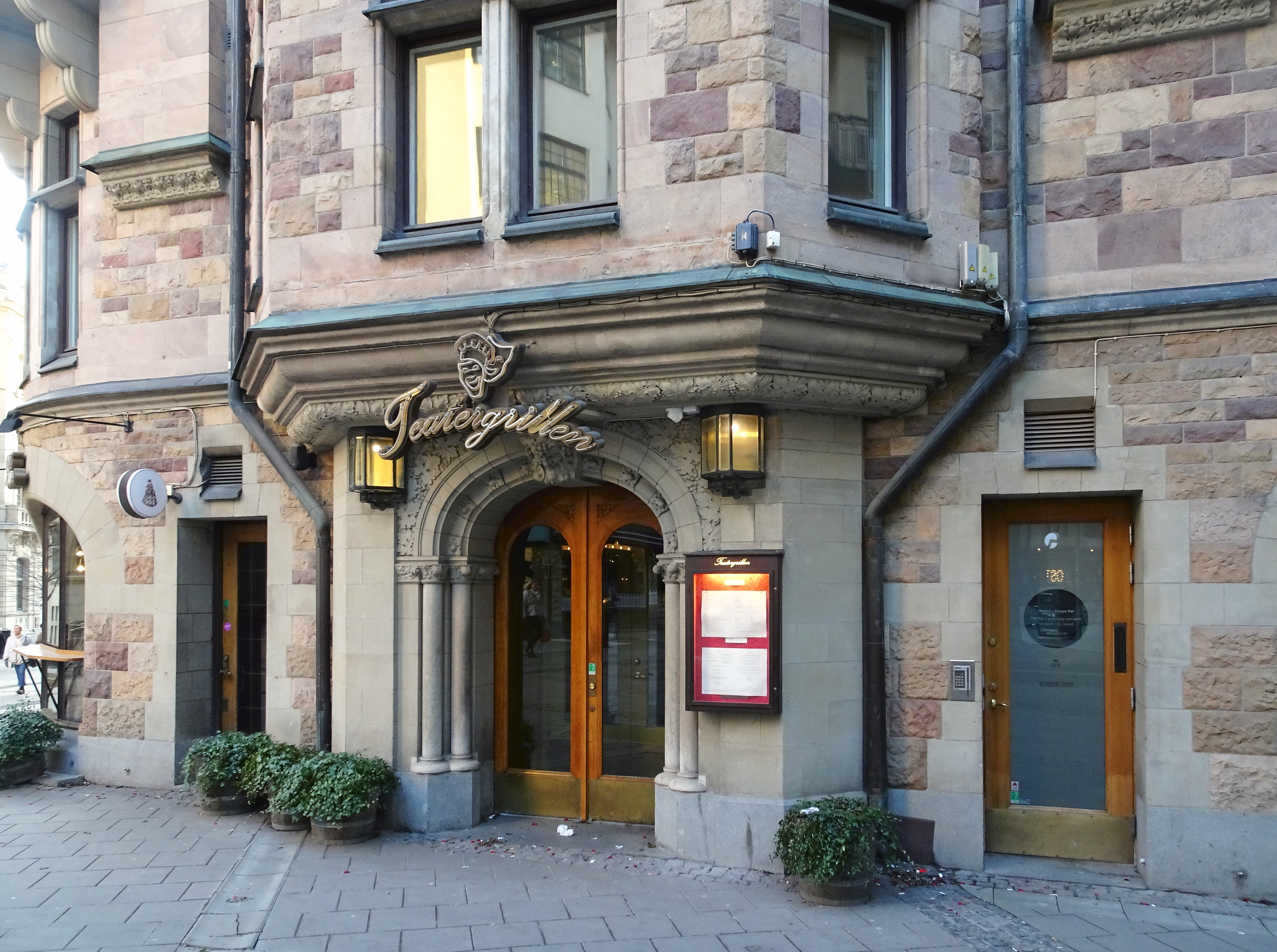
Teatergrillens entrance (2020) Teatergrillens dining room (2022)
