= Kanske en gentleman (1935 film) =

- Directed by: Ragnar Arvedson; Tancred Ibsen
- Written by: Theodor Berthels; Berndt Carlberg; Ulla Kåge
- Based on: Pygmalion by George Bernard Shaw
- Produced by: Olof Thiel
- Starring: Adolf Jahr; Carl Barcklind; Olga Andersson; Brita Appelgren
- Cinematography: Ernst Westerberg
- Music by: Sune Waldimir
- Production company: AB Irefilm
- Release date: August 24, 1935
- Running time: 98 minutes
- Country: Sweden

Kanske en gentleman (Perhaps a Gentleman) is a Swedish drama film from 1935 directed by Ragnar Arvedson and Tancred Ibsen. The film script was written by Theodor Berthels, Berndt Carlberg (pseudonym Berco), and Ulla Kåge. It was based on George Bernard Shaw's play Pygmalion.

The play also served as the basis for Anthony Asquith's and Leslie Howard's British film Pygmalion in 1938 and the musical My Fair Lady, which was filmed in the United States by George Cukor in 1964. The two Swedish films Kanske en gentleman (1950) and Fly mej en greve (1959) are also based on the play.

The film had its Swedish premiere on August 24, 1935 at the Astoria cinema in Stockholm.

== Cast ==
- Adolf Jahr as Gustaf "Gurra" Lind, a dock worker
- Carl Barcklind as company director Hugo Berner
- Olga Andersson as Sofia Berner, his wife
- Brita Appelgren as Vera Berner, his daughter
- Frank Sundström a Erik Berner, his son
- Ivar Kåge as Olof Mellgren, a doctor and friend of the Berner family
- Einar Axelsson as Baron Lejonsvan
- Maj Törnblad as Brita Olsson, an office girl at Berner's office
- Margit Andelius as Miss Höst, an office manager at Berner's office
- Aino Taube as Lisa, Berner's maid
- Ragnar Widestedt as a private detective
- Axel Högel as a workshop owner, Gurra's friend
- Torsten Winge as Rosenblom, a hairdresser
- Sture Baude as Persson, a pawnbroker
- Ernst Brunman as a port worker at Stadsgården / a man at the beer café
