= Flicka i kasern =

1955 film

- Directed by: Börje Larsson
- Written by: Börje Larsson; Ragnar Arvedson
- Starring: Sonja Stjernquist; Egon Larsson
- Release date: 26 December 1955
- Running time: 96 minutes
- Country: Sweden
- Language: Swedish

Flicka i kasern is a 1955 Swedish comedy, romance film directed by Börje Larsson, and starring Sonja Stjernquist and Egon Larsson.

== Cast ==
- Sonja Stjernquist as Eva Seman
- Egon Larsson as Staffan Torell
- Sten Gester as Allan Bergsten
- Åke Söderblom as Fredrik Berg
- Hjördis Petterson as Olga
- Mary Rapp as Beda
- Siv Ericks as Edith
- Torsten Lilliecrona as Corporal
- Carl-Gustaf Lindstedt as Police Commissioner
- Harry Ahlin as Ernst Jansson
- Ragnar Arvedson as Colonel
- Hans Strååt as Captain
