= Ingrid Luterkort =

Swedish actress

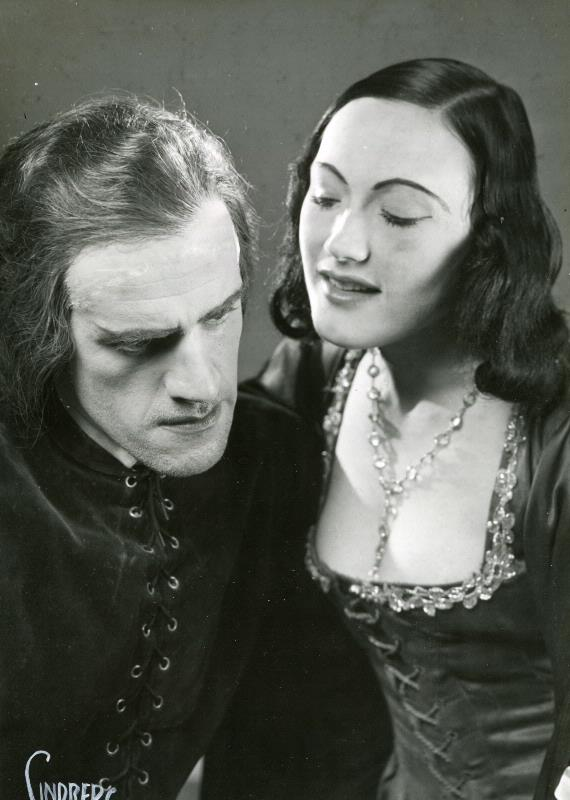
- Born: 28 June 1910; Lund, Sweden
- Died: 3 August 2011 (aged 101); Sweden
- Occupation: Actress
- Years active: 1932–2011
- Spouse(s): Einar Luterkort (1935–52; divorced); Bengt Segerstedt (1952–1986; his death)

Carola Ingrid Margareta Segerstedt Luterkort (née Eklundh, 28 June 1910 – 3 August 2011) was a Swedish actress and stage director, whose professional career spanned from 1932 to 2011.

Born in Lund, Luterkort studied in the Royal Dramatic Training Academy (1932–1934) together with Ingrid Bergman, Gunnar Björnstrand and Signe Hasso. She made her debut at the Royal Dramatic Theatre in 1933. She taught Theatre Studies at Stockholm University 1970–1977.

Luterkort remained active into her 90s. Some of her films are Barnen från Frostmofjället (1945) and Klassfesten (2002). In 1998, she released a book on theatre history, Om igen, herr Molander!.

== Personal life ==
Luterkort was married twice. From 1935 until 1952, she was married to Einar Luterkort. After that marriage ended in divorce, she married Bengt Segerstedt. This marriage lasted until 1986, when her husband died. Luterkort turned 100 years old and celebrated by reading Dagens Dikt on the radio.

She died on 3 August 2011, aged 101.

== Selected filmography ==
- It Pays to Advertise (1936)
- Happy Vestköping (1937)
- The People of Bergslagen (1937)
- Comrades in Uniform (1938)
- Bashful Anton (1940)
- Dunungen (1941)
- The Case of Ingegerd Bremssen (1942)
- A Girl for Me (1943)
- Imprisoned Women (1943)
- I Love You Karlsson (1947)
- Neglected by His Wife (1947)

== Sources ==
- "Ingrid Luterkort" (in Swedish). Swedish Film Institute.
- Ingrid Luterkort at IMDb
