= Carl Barcklind =

Swedish actor

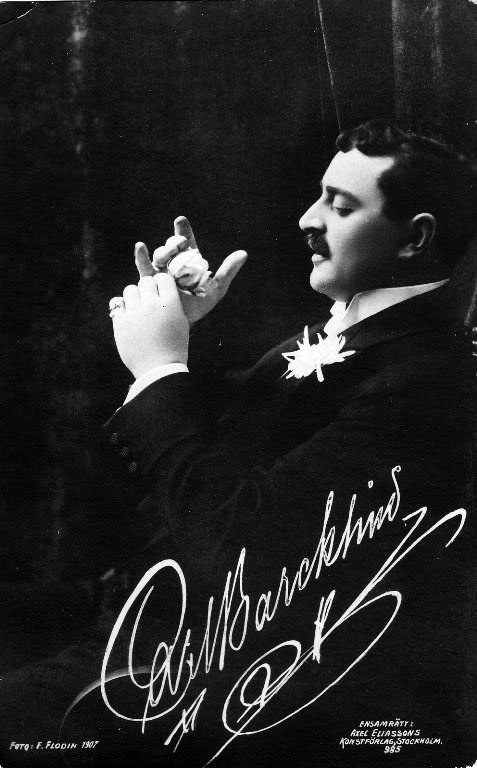
- Barcklind in 1907
- Born: 1 June 1873; Sala, Sweden
- Died: 21 August 1945 (aged 72); Stockholm, Sweden
- Occupation: Actor
- Years active: 1907–1945 (film)

Carl Barcklind (1 June 1873 – 21 August 1945) was a Swedish stage and film actor.

== Biography ==
Carl Vilhelm Barcklind was born at Sala in Västmanland County, Sweden. He made his debut as an opera singer in 1907 at the Oscarsteatern. He was associated with Albert Ranft as an actor in operettas in his theaters 1898–1922. Barcklind was director of Stora Teatern in Gothenburg 1925–1927. He toured the United States from 1927 to 1928 and was employed by the Royal Dramatic Theatre in 1930. Barcklind is buried at Norra begravningsplatsen in Stockholm.

== Selected filmography ==
- Ingeborg Holm (1913)
- The People of Norrland (1930)
- Longing for the Sea (1931)
- Servant's Entrance (1932)
- Black Roses (1932)
- Dear Relatives (1933)
- Kanske en gentleman (1935)
- Adventure in Pyjamas (1935)
- The Quartet That Split Up (1936)
- Mother Gets Married (1937)
- John Ericsson, Victor of Hampton Roads (1937)
- Career (1938)
- Her Little Majesty (1939)
- Mot nya tider (1939)
- The Two of Us (1939)
- The Crazy Family (1940)
- Hanna in Society (1940)
- Blossom Time (1940)
- Västkustens hjältar (1940)
- The Three of Us (1940)
- A Crime (1940)
- Lasse-Maja (1941)
- The Case of Ingegerd Bremssen (1942)
- Dangerous Ways (1942)
- Imprisoned Women (1943)

== Bibliography ==
- Gunnar Iverson, Astrid Soderbergh Widding & Tytti Soila. Nordic National Cinemas. Routledge, 2005.
