= Tekla Sjöblom =

Swedish actress

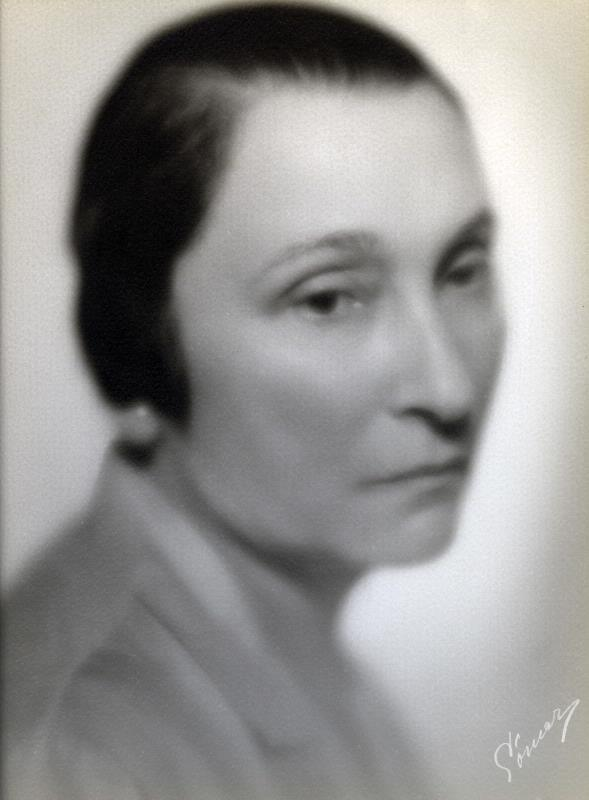
- Born: 21 July 1878; Stockholm, Sweden
- Died: 30 May 1967 (aged 88); Stockholm, Sweden
- Occupation: Actress
- Years active: 1899-1961

Tekla Sjöblom (21 July 1878 – 30 May 1967) was a Swedish actress. She appeared in more than 30 films between 1916 and 1961.

== Selected filmography ==
- Thomas Graal's Ward (1922)
- Sealed Lips (1927)
- Modern Wives (1932)
- The People of Högbogården (1939)
- Scanian Guerilla (1941)
- The Forest Is Our Heritage (1944)
- Count Only the Happy Moments (1944)
- Black Roses (1945)
- Crime and Punishment (1945)
- Lars Hård (1948)
- Sir Arne's Treasure (1954)
- Woman in a Fur Coat (1958)
- Lovely Is the Summer Night (1961)
