= Two Men and a Widow =

1933 film

- Directed by: John Lindlöf
- Written by: Börje Larsson; Åke Söderblom
- Based on: Der Regimentspapa by Richard Kessler and Heinrich Stobitzer
- Produced by: Stellan Claësson
- Starring: Gösta Ekman; Gull-Maj Norin; Tollie Zellman
- Cinematography: Julius Jaenzon; Sven Thermænius
- Edited by: Rolf Husberg
- Music by: Eric Bengtson
- Production company: John Lindloef Productions
- Distributed by: Film AB Le Mat-Metro-Goldwyn
- Release date: 26 December 1933
- Running time: 89 minutes
- Country: Sweden
- Language: Swedish

Two Men and a Widow (Swedish: Två man om en änka) is a 1933 Swedish comedy film directed by John Lindlöf, written by Börje Larsson and starring Gösta Ekman, Gull-Maj Norin and Tollie Zellman. It was shot at the Råsunda Studios in Stockholm. The film's sets were designed by the art director Arne Åkermark.

A 1984 film of the same name, based on the same play, was directed by Albert Gaubier.

== Cast ==
- Gösta Ekman as 39 Ludwig Karlsson
- Martin Öhman as Öhman
- Tollie Zellman as Emilia Lundvall
- Gull-Maj Norin as Karin Lundvall
- Bengt Djurberg as Paul Rosencrona
- Thor Modéen as Manager Ström
- Åke Ohberg as Harry Garpman
- Maritta Marke as Elsa
- Ilse-Nore Tromm as Märy
- Anna-Lisa Baude as Stina
- Jullan Jonsson as Johanna
- Ulwa Wiman as Viola
- Wiktor Andersson as Sheet-metal worker

== Bibliography ==
- Freiburg, Jeanne Ellen. Regulatory Bodies: Gendered Visions of the State in German and Swedish Cinema. University of Minnesota, 1994.
