= The Andersson Family =

1937 film

- Directed by: Sigurd Wallén
- Written by: Jens Locher (play); Weyler Hildebrand; Torsten Lundqvist
- Starring: Sigurd Wallén; Elsa Carlsson; Inga-Bodil Vetterlund
- Cinematography: Martin Bodin
- Music by: Kai Gullmar
- Production company: Svensk Talfilm
- Distributed by: Svensk Talfilm
- Release date: 11 October 1937
- Running time: 71 minutes
- Country: Sweden
- Language: Swedish

The Andersson Family (Swedish: Familjen Andersson) is a 1937 Swedish comedy film directed by Sigurd Wallén and starring Wallén, Elsa Carlsson and Inga-Bodil Vetterlund. It was shot at the Råsunda Studios in Stockholm. The film's sets were designed by the art director Arne Åkermark.

== Cast ==
- Sigurd Wallén as Kalle Andersson
- Elsa Carlsson as Maria Andersson
- Inga-Bodil Vetterlund as Elsa Andersson
- Hilda Borgström as Kalle's Mother
- Allan Bohlin as Erik Bruhn
- Björn Berglund as Pelle Karlsson
- Hilding Gavle as Pettersson
- Karin Albihn as Therése Garpe
- Ragnar Widestedt as Garpe, banker
- Arthur Fischer as Konsul Bruhn
- Gudrun Brost as Lisa
- Carl Browallius as Amiral Sörenholm
- Carl Ström as Major
- Emma Meissner as Mrs. Sörenholm
- Märtha Lindlöf as Mrs. Wallander
- Karin Granberg as Mrs. Lönnqvist
- Karin Appelberg-Sandberg as Mrs. Pettersson
- Hildur Lithman as Generalkonsulinnan
- Hugo Björne as Lawyer Nyhlén
- Emil Fjellström as Kalles vän
- Einar Lindström as Gurra Svensson
- Yngve Nyqvist as Waiter
- Georg Skarstedt as Tvätteriarbetare
- Inga-Lill Åhström as Tvätteriarbeterska

== Bibliography ==
- Qvist, Per Olov & Von Bagh, Peter . Guide to the Cinema of Sweden and Finland. Greenwood Publishing Group, 2000.
- Wallengren, Ann-Kristin. Welcome Home Mr Swanson: Swedish Emigrants and Swedishness on Film. Nordic Academic Press, 2014.
