= Modern Wives =

1932 film

- Directed by: Edvin Adolphson
- Written by: Algot Sandberg (play); Edvin Adolphson; Gösta Stevens
- Produced by: Eric A. Pettersson
- Starring: Ivar Kåge; Margit Manstad; Elsa Carlsson
- Cinematography: Valdemar Christensen
- Music by: Elof Adolphson; Bert Carsten; Sonja Sahlberg
- Production company: Filmindustri AB Triumvir
- Distributed by: Film AB Paramount
- Release date: 21 September 1932
- Running time: 87 minutes
- Country: Sweden
- Language: Swedish

Modern Wives (Swedish: Modärna fruar) is a 1932 Swedish drama film directed by Edvin Adolphson and starring Ivar Kåge, Margit Manstad and Elsa Carlsson. It was shot at the Valby Studios of Nordisk Film in Copenhagen. The film's sets were designed by the art director Christian Hansen.

== Synopsis ==
Lola, the wife of Stockholm architect Georg Wall, returns to their apartment one day and announces she wants a divorce.

== Cast ==
- Ivar Kåge as Georg Wall
- Margit Manstad as Lola Wall
- Edvin Adolphson as Tallén
- Elsa Carlsson as Ebba Tallén
- Olof Winnerstrand as Acke
- Oscar Byström as Wall Sr.
- Constance Byström as Mrs. Ekberg
- Einar Beyron as Refrängsångare
- Eivor Engelbrektsson as Ung dam
- Disa Gillis as Ung dam
- Ollars-Erik Landberg as Rockvaktmästare
- Otto Lington as Orkesterledare
- Tekla Sjöblom as Clara

== Bibliography ==
- Freiburg, Jeanne Ellen. Regulatory Bodies: Gendered Visions of the State in German and Swedish Cinema. University of Minnesota, 1994.
