= The Ghost of Bragehus =

1936 film

- Directed by: Ragnar Arvedson; Tancred Ibsen
- Written by: Börje Larsson; Ragnar Arvedson
- Starring: Adolf Jahr; Annalisa Ericson; Tollie Zellman
- Cinematography: Olle Comstedt
- Edited by: Rolf Husberg
- Music by: Olof Thiel
- Production company: AB Irefilm
- Distributed by: AB Anglo Film
- Release date: 25 November 1936
- Running time: 90 minutes
- Country: Sweden
- Language: Swedish

The Ghost of Bragehus (Swedish: Spöket på Bragehus) is a 1936 Swedish comedy film directed by Ragnar Arvedson and Tancred Ibsen and starring Adolf Jahr, Annalisa Ericson and Tollie Zellman. The film's sets were designed by the art director Manne Runsten.

== Synopsis ==
Adrienne has inherited the ramshackle Bragehus Castle, and she is courted by Einar. This annoys her aunts who have lived at the castle for many years. They decide to scare Einar away by pretending to be ghosts.

== Cast ==
- Adolf Jahr as Einar Hård
- Annalisa Ericson as Adrienne Brage
- Tollie Zellman as Agate Brage
- Britta Estelle as Young Agate Brage
- Gerda Björne as Beat-Sophie Brage
- Märtha Lindlöf as Constance Brage
- Eric Abrahamsson as Eriksson
- Einar Axelsson as Arnell
- Olof Sandborg as Dyhlén
- Hugo Björne as Joachim Brage
- John Ericsson as Befallningsman
- Anders Frithiof as Rik bonde
- Torsten Hillberg as Rik bonde
- Erik Johansson as Dräng
- Siri Olson as Maid
- Ragnar Widestedt as Landsfiskalen

== Bibliography ==
- Larsson, Mariah & Marklund, Anders. Swedish Film: An Introduction and Reader. Nordic Academic Press, 2010.
