= Mother Gets Married =

1937 film

- Directed by: Ivar Johansson
- Written by: Ivar Johansson
- Starring: Carl Barcklind; Margit Manstad; Annalisa Ericson
- Cinematography: Ernst Westerberg
- Music by: Hanns Bingang
- Production company: Sveriges Biografägares Distributionsbyrå
- Distributed by: Sveriges Biografägares Distributionsbyrå
- Release date: 23 October 1937
- Running time: 86 minutes
- Country: Sweden
- Language: Swedish

Mother Gets Married (Swedish: Mamma gifter sig) is a 1937 Swedish comedy film directed by Ivar Johansson and starring Carl Barcklind, Margit Manstad and Annalisa Ericson. It was shot at the Kristallsalongen Studios in Stockholm and on location in the city. The film's sets were designed by the art director Bertil Duroj.

== Synopsis ==
When her widowed mother plans to sell a hotel she owns, her daughter goes to investigate the business undercover.

== Cast ==
- Carl Barcklind as Berner
- Margit Manstad as Mrs. Lena Helling
- Annalisa Ericson as Mona Helling
- Nils Ohlin as Folke Berner
- Georg Funkquist as Ambrosius Andersson
- Torsten Bergström as Porter
- Hugo Björne as Albert Meyer
- Olle Törnquist as Håkan Wallenius
- Lars Seligman as Astervall
- Gösta Bodin as Angry hotel guest
- Artur Cederborgh as Police officer
- Albin Erlandzon as Police officer
- Arthur Fischer as Hotel guest in restaurant
- Elsa Holmquist as Kajsa
- Nils Johannisson as Hotel guest
- Eivor Landström as Meyer's secretary
- John Norrman as Jönsson
- Robert Ryberg as Police officer
- Saga Sjöberg as Maid
- Hugo Tranberg as Taxi driver
- Lisa Wirström as Hotel guest

== Bibliography ==
- Qvist, Per Olov & von Bagh, Peter. Guide to the Cinema of Sweden and Finland. Greenwood Publishing Group, 2000.
