= Inga-Bodil Vetterlund =

Swedish actress

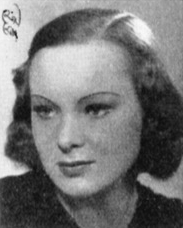
- Vetterlund in 1940
- Born: Inga-Bodil Isabella Vetterlund; 30 January 1914; Stockholm, Sweden
- Died: 14 September 1980 (aged 66)
- Occupation: Actress
- Years active: 1930–1967

Inga-Bodil Vetterlund (30 January 1914 – 14 September 1980) was a Swedish film and stage actress.

== Selected filmography ==
- Charlotte Löwensköld (1930)
- Pettersson - Sverige (1934)
- Adventure in Pyjamas (1935)
- Söder om landsvägen (1936)
- Poor Millionaires (1936)
- The Andersson Family (1937)
- Sun Over Sweden (1938)
- Alle man på post (1940)
- Fransson the Terrible (1941)
- Tre glada tokar (1942)
- Aktören (1943)
- Som folk är mest (1944)
- Sabotage (1944)
- The Green Lift (1944)
- Tired Theodore (1945)
- Between Brothers (1946)
- Sällskapslek (1963)
