= Toast Skagen =

Swedish toast dish

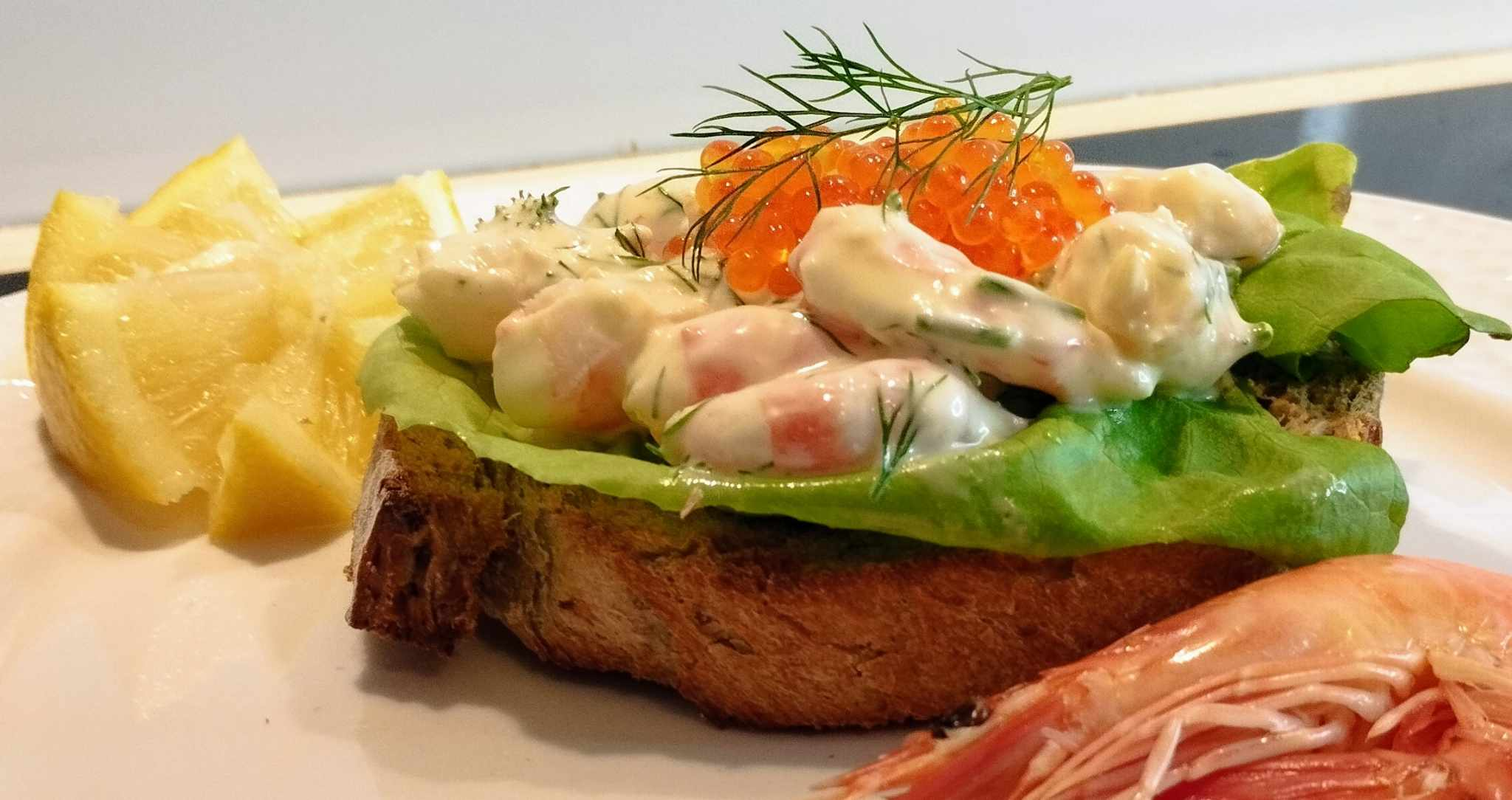
Toast Skagen

Toast Skagen is a Swedish starter and food dish. It consists of pieces of toasted bread and a prawn salad called skagenröra, typically made with mayonnaise, sour cream and dill, sometimes dijon mustard, and garnished with roe. Sometimes crab or crabsticks are substituted for prawns. The name of the dish stems from Skagen in Denmark, where it is also popular, but going under the name Skagenssalat. The dish was created by the Stockholm-based restaurateur and chef Tore Wretman. He introduced Toast Skagen to the public in the 1950s. It is a popular entrée and starter dish in the Nordics, especially during spring, summer and autumn.

The dish has been subject to various adaptations, including the crab/crabstick version, which is more popular during the Swedish and Finnish crab season from July to October.

== See also ==
- List of toast dishes
