= Tollie Zellman =

Swedish actress

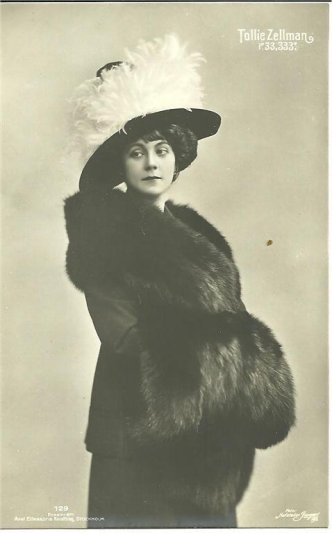
- Born: 31 August 1887; Stockholm, Sweden
- Died: 9 October 1964 (aged 77); Stockholm, Sweden
- Occupation: Actor
- Years active: 1906–1952

Berta Alice Victoria "Tollie" Zellman (31 August 1887 – 9 October 1964) was a Swedish actor and director. She appeared in 49 films between 1906 and 1964. Tollie Zellman appeared on scene first 1907. She is one of Sweden's most famous comediennes. From 1941 to 1947 she worked at the Oscar Theater in Stockholm. Her most famous role was as Mrs Dulcie Baxter in a play by Hubert Henry Davies, The Mollusc. From 1906 to 1964 she played in nearly 50 films.

== Life ==
Berta Alice Victoria "Tollie" Zellman was born on 31 August 1887 in Norrmalm, Stockholm. Her father was a church and decorative painter. Zellman attended the Åhlin school and then a girls' school in Nyköping. Zellman described herself as the class clown at school. She went into office work at the Nordiska Kompaniet in Nyköping after leaving school, but harbored dreams of going on stage. Her parents were not supportive of the move. Zellman was 19 when she made her stage debut, in 1906, at the Örnsköldsvik theatre. Tollie was a childhood nickname, and became her stage name.

Zellman toured with the Alfred Lundberg company, but left the company in 1908 when she found she was pregnant. She had a daughter in March 1908, who became actor Lill-Tollie Zellman. Zellman took a job in Helsinki with the August Bodén operetta company to support herself and her child.

Zellman initially played character roles, and studied acting in Paris. She also directed at Svenska Teatern in Helsinki and other Swedish theatres in the late 1920s. Her big breakthrough as an actor came in 1911, playing Jenny in the play 33,333 at the Folk theatre, followed by the role of Mrs. Dulcie Baxter in Hubert Henry Davies's comedy play Mollusken, which she played on stage and on radio. She appeared in 49 films between 1906 and 1964. Zellman was known for her aristocratic acting style, and characteristic drawl. Actor Hjördis Petterson said that Zellman would deliver “one syllable every minute”.

Zellman died on 9 October 1964 in Kungsholm parish, Stockholm. She was married in 1916 to consul Viggo Berch, and then from 1918-–1923 to chamberlain Carl Holmquist.

== Selected filmography ==
- Kolingens galoscher (1912)
- Norrtullsligan (1923)
- Servant's Entrance (1932)
- Two Men and a Widow (1933)
- Wife for a Day (1933)
- Andersson's Kalle (1934)
- Munkbrogreven (1935)
- Kungen kommer (1936)
- Poor Millionaires (1936)
- Our Boy (1936)
- The Ghost of Bragehus (1936)
- Happy Vestköping (1937)
- Career (1938)
- Comrades in Uniform (1938)
- Between Us Barons (1939)
- Circus (1939)
- Emilie Högquist (1939)
- Nothing But the Truth (1939)
- One, But a Lion! (1940)
- Heroes in Yellow and Blue (1940)
- Poor Ferdinand (1941)
- Tonight or Never (1941)
- There's a Fire Burning (1943)
- I Killed (1943)
- Blåjackor (1945)
- Idel ädel adel (1945)
- Tired Theodore (1945)
- While the Door Was Locked (1946)
- Lilla Märta kommer tillbaka (1948)
- The Green Lift (1952)
