= Happy Vestköping =

1937 film

- Directed by: Ragnar Arvedson
- Written by: Ferdinand Altenkirch; Ragnar Arvedson; Börje Larsson
- Produced by: Ragnar Arvedson
- Starring: Isa Quensel; Einar Axelsson; Nils Wahlbom
- Cinematography: Willy Goldberger
- Edited by: Rolf Husberg
- Music by: Olof Thiel
- Production company: AB Irefilm
- Distributed by: AB Irefilm
- Release date: 20 August 1937
- Running time: 78 minutes
- Country: Sweden
- Language: Swedish

Happy Vestköping (Swedish: Lyckliga Vestköping) is a 1937 Swedish comedy film directed and co-written by Ragnar Arvedson and starring Isa Quensel, Einar Axelsson and Nils Wahlbom.

== Synopsis ==
The small Swedish town of Vestköping awaits the arrival of Justus Napoleon Rosén, who had emigrated to the United States many years earlier and has reportedly become very wealthy, while the town itself has struggled in recent years on the back of the Vestköping mine doing poorly.

== Cast ==
- Isa Quensel as Ann-Marie Brandt
- Einar Axelsson as Lennart Rosén
- Nils Wahlbom as Uncle Justus Napoleon Rosén
- Tollie Zellman as Vivi Rosén
- Olav Riégo as Theodor Rosén
- John W. Brunius as Skotte, banker
- Eric Abrahamsson as Edvard Claesson
- Charley Paterson as Mayor
- Georg Funkquist as Hotel manager
- Stig Järrel as Author Rolf Gånge
- Olof Sandborg as Department manager
- Sigge Fürst as Worker at the railway station
- Ragnar Arvedson as Secretary
- Gillis Blom as Torphammar
- Rolf Botvid as Bank clerk
- Bertil Ehrenmark as Unemployed
- Georg Fernqvist as Mayor's secretary
- Millan Fjellström as Woman reading a news article
- Wictor Hagman as Janitor at City Hall
- Nils Hallberg as Bell boy
- Sten Hedlund as Secretary
- Gösta Hillberg as Office manager
- Per Hugo Jacobsson as Unemployed
- Håkan Jahnberg as Anne-Marie's secretary
- Nils Johannisson as Hotel clerk
- Erik Johansson as Worker
- Magnus Kesster as Westman
- Sven Kihlberg as American in telephone
- John Lindén as Young man asking for Justus Rosén
- Ingrid Luterkort as Rosén's maid
- Gösta Lycke as Thrane
- Holger Löwenadler as Krohn
- Otto Malmberg as Cashier
- Arthur Natorp as Bank clerk
- Siri Olson as Woman in the waiting room
- Edla Rothgardt as Woman reading a news article
- Robert Ryberg as Fire captain
- Harald Svensson as Man in the waiting room
- Eric von Gegerfelt as Bank customer
- Oscar Åberg as Guest in Rådhussalen

== Bibliography ==
- Wallengren, Ann-Kristin. Welcome Home Mr Swanson: Swedish Emigrants and Swedishness on Film. Nordic Academic Press, 2014.
