= Lillebil Kjellén =

Swedish actress

- Born: December 3, 1921; Drammen, Norway
- Died: March 7, 1994 (aged 72); Stockholm, Sweden
- Occupation: Actress
- Spouse(s): Tore Wretman (1945–1953); Lars Nordrum

Britta Lillebil Sofia Kjellén, a.k.a. Lillebil Nordrum (December 3, 1921 – March 7, 1994) was a Swedish actress born Drammen, Norway to Swedish parents. She grew up in Stockholm, Sweden, where she attended the Royal Dramatic Training Academy. She made her screen debut in the 1938 film Karriär, and she played several roles in Swedish films in the 1940s and 1950s. Kjellén was married to the Swedish chef Tore Wretman from 1945 to 1953, and then to the Norwegian actor Lars Nordrum.

== Filmography ==
- Career (1938) as the young lady in front of the theater manager in the audience at the Apollo Theater
- Life Begins Today (1939) as a ballet dancer (uncredited)
- Beredskapspojkar (1940) as a guest at the dance (uncredited)
- Karusellen går (1940) as a funfair visitor (uncredited)
- Only a Woman (1941) as a dinner guest at the Juréns (uncredited)
- Fransson the Terrible (1941) as Britta Lund
- Nygifta (1941) as the young lady at the restaurant (uncredited)
- Uppåt igen (1941) as a young lady (uncredited)
- Doktor Glas (1942) as Lowenius's daughter
- Olycksfågeln nr 13 (1942) as Mary Borring
- Flickan är ett fynd (1943) as Karin
- Life and Death (1943) as Gittan
- Narkos (1944) as a woman at the party (uncredited)
- På farliga vägar (1944) as Kid Gaston's girlfriend
- 13 stoler (1945) as Gun Svärdsjö, a cigarette girl at the Café Royal
- En förtjusande fröken (1945) as Julia, Paul's maid
- Tre söner gick till flyget (1945) as Åke's girlfriend
- Försök inte med mej ..! (1946) as Miss Kulle, Kronberg's secretary
- I Love You Karlsson (1947) as Connie Schmidt
- Kvinnan gör mig galen (1948) as Sissi
- Beef and the Banana (1951) as Kerstin Carve
- The Green Lift (1952) as Elsie
- The Magnificent Lie (1955) as Gertrud, a maid
- The Summer Wind Blows (1955) as Mrs. Lindgren, the woman on the train
- Peter van Heeren (1957) as Miss Lyng
- Millionær for en aften (1960)
