= Ragnar Arvedson =

Swedish actor (1895–1973)

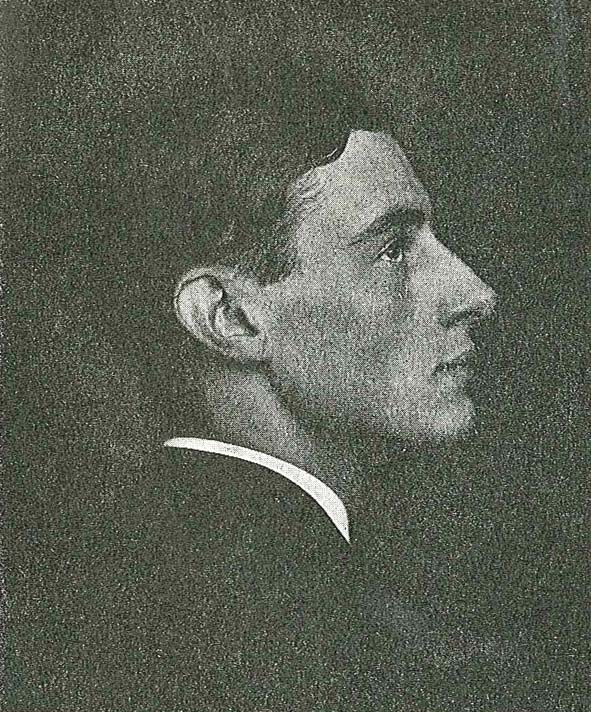
- Born: 4 December 1895; Linköping, Sweden
- Died: 2 October 1973 (aged 77); Stockholm, Sweden
- Occupations: Actor, director, writer, producer
- Years active: 1919–1972

Ragnar Arved Arvedson (4 December 1895 – 2 October 1973) was a Swedish actor, director, writer and producer. Arvedson appeared in about 50 roles in films between 1920 and 1970 and directed about 20 films between 1935 and 1949.

== Selected filmography ==
- Thomas Graal's Ward (1922)
- A Maid Among Maids (1924)
- Charles XII (1925)
- Her Little Majesty (1925)
- The Lady of the Camellias (1925)
- She Is the Only One (1926)
- His English Wife (1927)
- A Perfect Gentleman (1927)
- The Devil and the Smalander (1927)
- Sin (1928)
- Cavaliers of the Crown (1930)
- For Her Sake (1930)
- Dangerous Paradise (1931)
- Kanske en gentleman (1935)
- The Ghost of Bragehus (1936)
- The Wedding Trip (1936)
- Poor Millionaires (1936)
- Happy Vestköping (1937)
- Lucky Young Lady (1941)
- How to Tame a Real Man (1941)
- In Darkest Smaland (1943)
- Gentleman with a Briefcase (1943)
- Elvira Madigan (1943)
- The Girls in Smaland (1945)
- Brita in the Merchant's House (1946)
- Dinner for Two (1947)
- Flickan från tredje raden (1949)
- The Street (1949)
- In Lilac Time (1952)
- The Chieftain of Göinge (1953)
- Young Summer (1954)
- The Magnificent Lie (1955)
- Flicka i kasern (1955)
- Voyage in the Night (1955)
- The Summer Wind Blows (1955)
- Getting Married (1955)
- The Biscuit (1956)
- Bill Bergson Lives Dangerously (1957)
- A Lion in Town (1959)
- The Devil's Eye (1960)
- On a Bench in a Park (1960)
- Night Games (1966)
