= South of the Highway =

1936 film

- Directed by: Gideon Wahlberg
- Written by: Henry Richter
- Starring: Edvard Persson; Fritiof Billquist; Inga-Bodil Vetterlund
- Cinematography: Harald Berglund; Olle Ekman
- Edited by: Emil A. Lingheim
- Music by: Erik Baumann; Edvin Lindberg
- Production company: Europafilm
- Release date: 26 December 1936
- Running time: 98 minutes
- Country: Sweden
- Language: Swedish

South of the Highway (Swedish: Söder om landsvägen) is a 1936 Swedish comedy film directed by Gideon Wahlberg and starring Edvard Persson, Fritiof Billquist and Inga-Bodil Vetterlund.

The film's art direction was by Max Linder.

== Cast ==
- Edvard Persson as Edward Månsson
- Fritiof Billquist as Måns Månsson
- Inga-Bodil Vetterlund as Inga Månsson
- Alfhild Degerberg as Old Servant
- Mim Persson as Karna
- Benkt-Åke Benktsson as Truls
- Holger Sjöberg as Elof
- Nils Wahlbom as Isidor
- Agda Helin as Maggie
- Helge Mauritz as Aron Levander
- Georg af Klercker as Mr. Berghammar
- Signe Modin as Siri Berghammar
- Nils Ekman as Arne Berghammar
- Olov Wigren as Ivar
- John Degerberg as Policeman
- Margit Andelius as Måns' landlady
- Astrid Bodin as Maid
- Birgit Edlund as Måns' girlfriend in Lund
- Erik Forslund as Farmhand
- Olle Jansson as Student
- Birger Malmsten as Student
- John Norrman as Vet
- Carl Reinholdz as Farmhand
- Carl Ström as Chief of police
- Lisa Wirström as Sofi, the professor's housemaid

== Bibliography ==
- Qvist, Per Olov & von Bagh, Peter. Guide to the Cinema of Sweden and Finland. Greenwood Publishing Group, 2000.
