= Synnøve Solbakken (novel) =

1857 novel by Bjørnstjerne Bjørnson

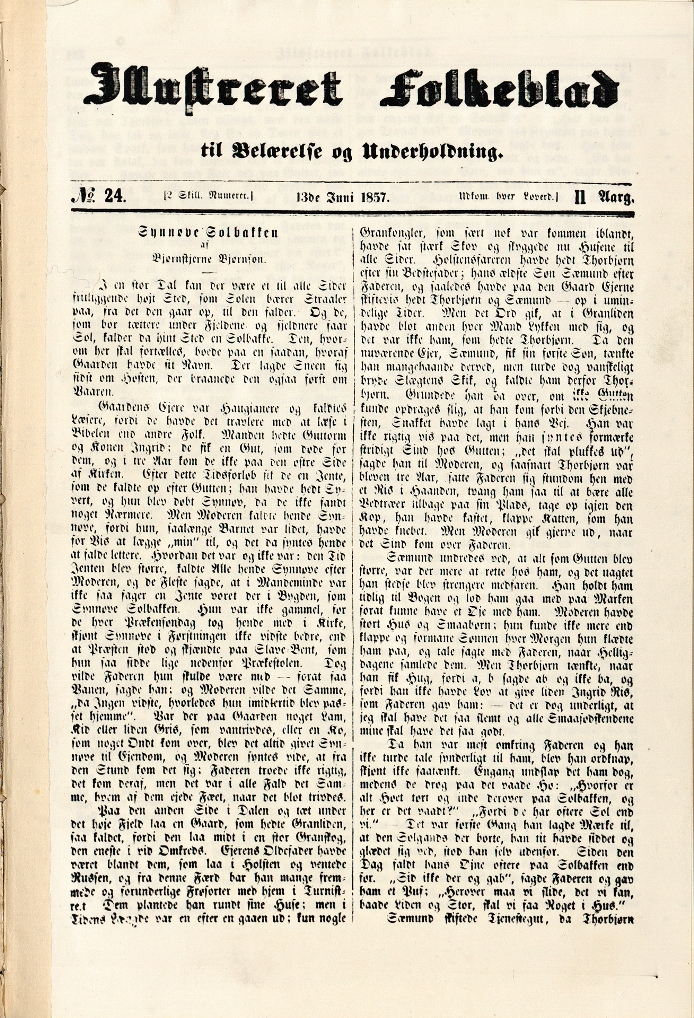
The first installment of Synnøve Solbakken, published in Illustreret Folkeblad on June 13, 1857

Synnøve Solbakken is a Norwegian peasant novel by Bjørnstjerne Bjørnson published in 1857. The story was first published in the newspaper Illustreret Folkeblad in 1857, and it was then issued in book form by Johan Fjeldsted Dahl that same year.

== Summary ==
The main characters are Torbjørn Granlien and Synnøve Solbakken. Torbjørn lives at the Granlien farm, which is in the shade, and Synnøve Solbakken lives at the Solbakken farm, where there is always sunshine. In the Granlien family, the eldest sons in each generation are always named Torbjørn and Sæmund, in alternation. It always goes well for those named Sæmund and badly for those named Torbjørn. Torbjørn's father, Sæmund, tries to stifle Torbjørn's wild nature by being strict and having Torbjørn do hard physical work. The book is about Torbjørn's struggle to win Synnøve Solbakken, his journey from the shadow side to the sunny side. Synnøve is also in love with Torbjørn, but her parents, especially her mother, do not think that Torbjørn is good enough for her. Finally, Torbjørn proves that he has changed by forgiving a man that stabbed him, almost killing him. The story ends with Torbjørn finally at the Solbakken farm, looking back at the Granlien farm.

== Film adaptations ==
The novel has been adapted for film four times:

- 1919: Synnöve Solbakken (Sweden, directed by John W. Brunius)
- 1934: Synnöve Solbakken (Sweden, directed by Tancred Ibsen)
- 1934: Synnøve Solbakken (Norway, directed by Tancred Ibsen)
- 1957: Synnöve Solbakken (Sweden, directed by Gunnar Hellström)

== In music ==
Swedish composer Hugo Alfvén wrote a Synnöve Solbakken Suite (Opus 50) from the 1934 film music, after Norwegian melodies.
