= Fransson the Terrible =

1941 film

- Directed by: Gösta Cederlund
- Written by: Ove Ekelund (novel); Theodor Berthels
- Produced by: Carl Anderson; Carl Florman; Gösta Sandin
- Starring: Elof Ahrle; Carl-Gunnar Wingård; Inga-Bodil Vetterlund
- Cinematography: Sten Dahlgren
- Edited by: Tage Holmberg
- Music by: Sven Rüno
- Production companies: Gloria-Film; Svensk Talfilm
- Distributed by: Svensk Talfilm
- Release date: 22 September 1941
- Running time: 81 minutes
- Country: Sweden
- Language: Swedish

Fransson the Terrible (Swedish: Fransson den förskräcklige) is a 1941 Swedish comedy film directed by Gösta Cederlund and starring Elof Ahrle, Carl-Gunnar Wingård, and Inga-Bodil Vetterlund. The film's sets were designed by the art director Bertil Duroj.

== Synopsis ==
Fransson, a baker, arrives in a small town and enjoys great success with his new type of whole wheat bread, rescuing a previously struggling bakery. However malicious rumors begin to spread that he has stolen money.

== Cast ==
- Elof Ahrle as Fransson
- Carl-Gunnar Wingård as Finholm
- Inga-Bodil Vetterlund as Barbro
- Rune Carlsten as Ågren
- Hilda Borgström as Miss Öhrström
- John Botvid as Vallin
- Einar Axelsson as Borg
- Marianne Löfgren as Rut
- Åke Engfeldt as Felix
- Emil Fjellström as Lösa Wilhelm
- Lillebil Kjellén as Britta Lund
- Yngve Nyqvist as Bakery Manager
- David Erikson as Head Clerk
- Bellan Roos as Anna
- John Elfström as Gunnar
- Elsie Albiin as Girl
- Ann-Margret Bergendahl as Kund i konditoriet
- Bengt Brunskog as Dansande ung man
- Carl Ericson as Konstapel Olofsson
- Erik Forslund as Man vid groggbordet
- Knut Frankman as Man vid groggbordet
- Mary Hjelteas Fru Lundström
- Svea Holm as Fru Karlsson
- Stig Johanson as Lindkvist
- Helge Karlsson as Policeman
- Helge Kihlberg as Herr Fred
- Wilma Malmlöf as Kund i bageriet

== Bibliography ==
- Krawc, Alfred. International Directory of Cinematographers, Set- and Costume Designers in Film: Denmark, Finland, Norway, Sweden (from the beginnings to 1984). Saur, 1986.
