= Lärarinna på vift =

1941 film

- Directed by: Börje Larsson
- Written by: Börje Larsson
- Starring: Karin Ekelund; Allan Bohlin; Georg Rydeberg; Gull Natorp; Eric Gustafson; Hugo Björne; Eric Abrahamsson
- Music by: Jules Sylvain; Hans Åke Gäfvert; Kai Gullmar
- Release date: 29 September 1941
- Running time: 83 min
- Country: Sweden
- Language: Swedish

Lärarinna på vift (transl. Schoolmistress on the loose) is a 1941 Swedish romantic comedy film directed by Börje Larsson, who also wrote the script.

== Plot summary ==
Karin Berggren is a strict teacher at Sunninge flickpension, a distinguished boarding school for girls in a venerable old castle in Scania in the south of Sweden. The school awaits the son of its founder for an inspection.

The night before the inspection Karin and her colleague Bror sneak away to visit a nightclub in Copenhagen. There, Karin suddenly, when she hears the nightclub singer sing, on a whim wants to see if she possibly could do it better? She gets herself up on stage and starts to sing. And is greeted by cheers and standing ovations.

After her success, Karin is offered an engagement at the nightclub, and accepts it, to be able to raise money to cover the embezzlement of the schools money by a colleague, that has just been discovered. So by daytime she is a teacher in French and by night a seductive nightclub singer in Copenhagen, under the name Lucy Phillips.

When the founders son Peter visits the girls school the following day, he soon understands what is going on and tries to put an end to Karins singing career, convinced that it is not appropriate for a teacher at the school.

Karin's double life is soon discovered at the school and the scandal is a fact. Colleagues gather for deliberation on Karin's future there, but she has already left for Copenhagen to perform. So the colleagues follow her, to see her performance with their own eyes, and there Karin makes her entrance on stage, singing Love's ABC...

== Cast ==
- Karin Ekelund as Karin Bergengren, teacher, appearing as a singer under the name Lucy Phillips
- Allan Bohlin as Peter Kullby
- Georg Rydeberg as Doctor Bror Viberg, a teacher
- Gull Natorp as Ms Kristin Bruuhn, Principal of Sunninge girls school
- Eric Gustafson as Jens Worms-Pedersen, manager of the nightclub Natuglen in Copenhagen
- Hugo Björne as chairman of the girls school, Count
- Eric Abrahamsson as Napoleon Bengtsson, janitor
- Hjördis Petterson as Ms Hedberg, a teacher
- Diana Miller as Nightclub singer
- Liane Linden as Astrid, a pupil
- Karin Nordgren as Gertrud Norell, a pupil
- Ulla Hodell as Marianne, a pupil
- Helga Hallén as a Danish journalist
- Ragnar Widestedt as a Danish journalist
- Sigge Fürst as "The Great", Kullbys contact at the nightclub
- Artur Rolén as his "accomplice"
- Sven Aage Larsen as head waiter at the nightclub
- Ester Textorius as Ms Boman, a teacher
- Wiktor "Kulörten" Andersson as a Danish journalist
- Richard Lund as a teacher
