= Solveig Hedengran =

Swedish actress (1910–1956)

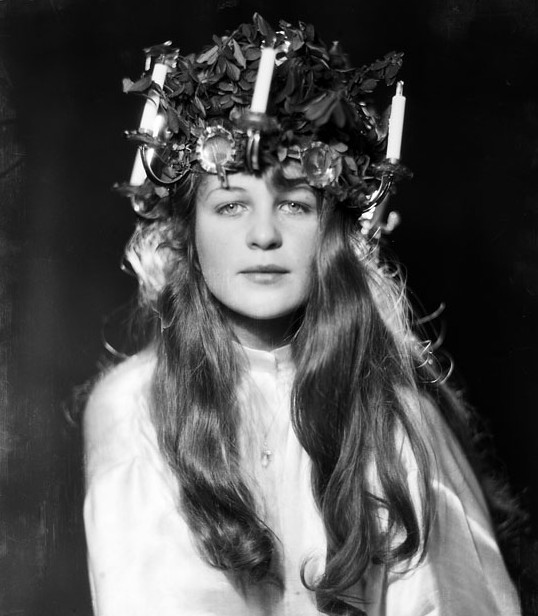
- Solveig Hedengran dressed as Saint Lucy
- Born: Solveig Hedengran; 26 April 1910; Stockholm, Sweden
- Died: 29 April 1956 (aged 46); Stockholm, Sweden
- Occupation: Actress
- Years active: 1919–1956
- Spouse(s): Folke Öfverholm (1936–1943)

Solveig Hedengran (26 April 1910 – 29 April 1956) was a Swedish stage and film actress. She appeared in about 30 films between 1919 and 1956.

Hedengran attended Dramatens Elevskola and is credited with being the first young woman to be crowned St Lucy in the modern celebration of the festival. She married Folke Öfverholm in 1936 (div. 1943); they had one daughter, Margareta. Hedengran suffered from poor health and died a week after being diagnosed with leukaemia in 1956.

== Selected filmography ==
- Synnöve Solbakken (1919)
- German Women - German Faithfulness (1927)
- The Poetry of Ådalen (1928)
- The Realm of the Rye (1929)
- The Österman Brothers' Virago (1932)
- Synnöve Solbakken (1934)
- Skärgårdsflirt (1935)
- Raggen (1936)
- Comrades in Uniform (1938)
- Mot nya tider (1939)
- Swing it, magistern! (1940)
- How to Tame a Real Man (1941)
- En trallande jänta (1942)
- Barnen från Frostmofjället (1945)
- Bill Bergson, Master Detective (1947)
- Love Wins Out (1949)
- Poker (1951)
- Bill Bergson and the White Rose Rescue (1953)
- All the World's Delights (1953)
- Café Lunchrasten (1954)
- The Girl in the Rain (1955)
