= The Magnificent Lie (1955 film) =

1955 film

- Yugoslavian release poster
- Directed by: Mike Road
- Written by: Bob Condon
- Based on: La Grande Bretèche by Honoré de Balzac
- Produced by: Signe Hasso
- Starring: Signe Hasso; Mike Road; Stig Olin
- Cinematography: Sven Nykvist
- Music by: Jules Sylvain
- Production company: Bauman-Produktion
- Distributed by: Sandrew-Baumanfilm
- Release date: 24 January 1955
- Running time: 95 minutes
- Country: Sweden
- Language: Swedish

The Magnificent Lie (Swedish: Den underbara lögnen) is a 1955 Swedish drama film directed by Mike Road and starring Signe Hasso, William Langford, Road and Stig Olin. It was shot at the Centrumateljéerna Studios in Stockholm. The film's sets were designed by the art director Arthur Spjuth. It is based on the 1831 short story La Grande Bretèche by Honoré de Balzac and a further short story by Guy de Maupassant. Hasso produced the film, having recently return from a Hollywood, and cast her husband Langford opposite her.

== Synopsis ==
On the night before her wedding a young prospective bride opens a book of short stories and witnesses two nineteenth century tales of love and tragedy.

== Cast ==
- Signe Hasso as Joséphine de Merret
- William Langford as Count Louis de Merret
- Ragnar Arvedson as Innkeeper
- Sven Arvor as Waiter
- Ann Bibby as Innkeeper's Wife
- John Botvid as Old Man
- Ruth Brady as Agnes' Cousin
- Tor Isedal as Policeman
- Lillebil Kjellén as Gertrud
- Stig Olin as Goronflot
- Hjördis Petterson as Aunt Emilie
- Mike Road as Edmond
- Naima Wifstrand as Gertrud (50 years later)

== Bibliography ==
- Hannsberry, Karen Burroughs. Femme Noir: Bad Girls of Film. McFarland, 2012.
- Krawc, Alfred. International Directory of Cinematographers, Set- and Costume Designers in Film: Denmark, Finland, Norway, Sweden (from the beginnings to 1984). Saur, 1986.
