= Gustaf Wally =

Swedish actor

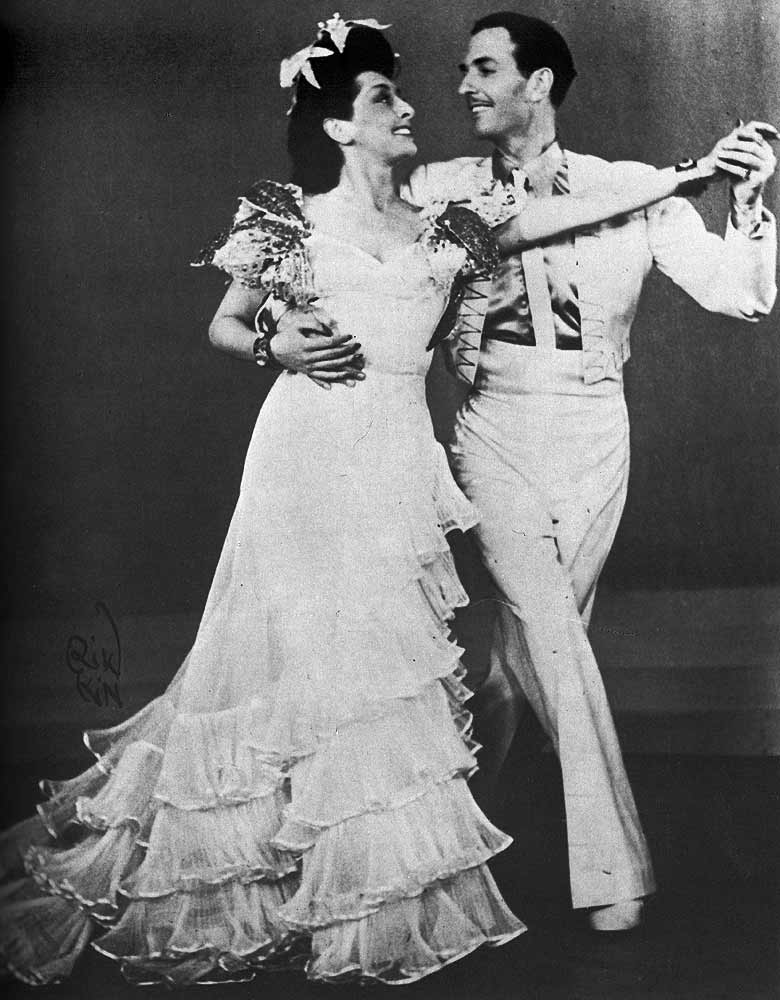

Gustaf Wally (24 November 1905 – 3 March 1966), Swedish dancer, actor and theatre manager, was born Gustaf Wallenberg. He was a member of the industrialist Wallenberg family.

He formed the dance troupe the Wally brothers along with the Dane Niels Bagge-Wessel. In the 1930s, Gustaf Wally participated in shows by Karl Gerhard and Kar de Mumma. He was the head of "Södra Teatern" in Stockholm from 1939 to 1941, and "Oscarsteatern" from 1942 to 1947. Wally was known for hosting shows in the indoor circus arena in Stockholm's Djurgården. He made ten records and took part in seven movies.

Wally died of a heart attack during a flight between New York and Panama in 1966.

== Selected filmography ==
- The Dangerous Game (1933)
- Som du vill ha mej (1943)

== See also ==
- Raoul Wallenberg, Wally's cousin
