= Synnöve Solbakken (1934 film) =

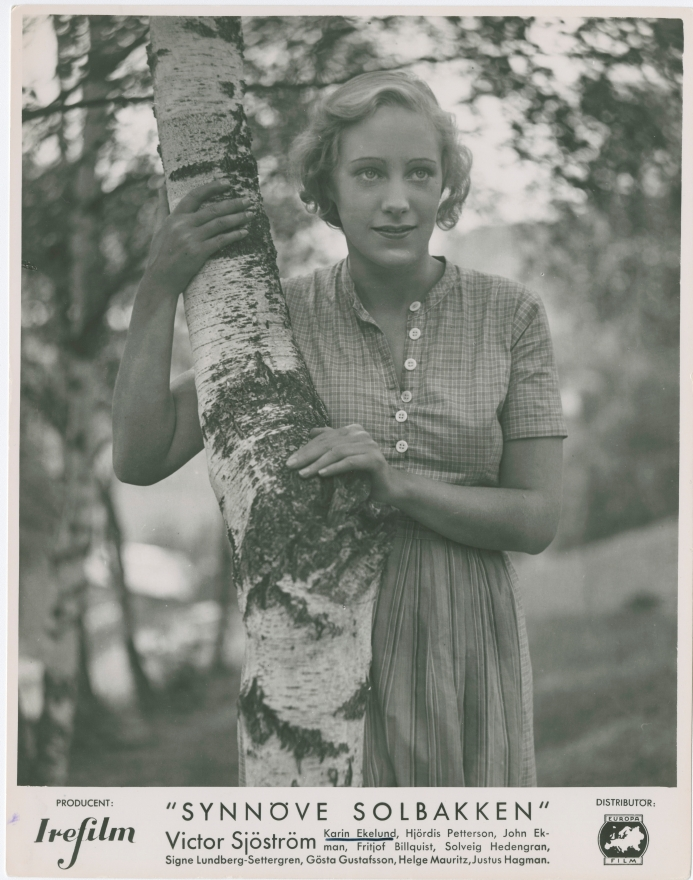
- Directed by: Tancred Ibsen
- Written by: Tancred Ibsen, Torsten Flodén
- Based on: Synnøve Solbakken by Bjørnstjerne Bjørnson
- Produced by: Olof Thiel
- Starring: Karin Ekelund; Fritiof Billquist; Helge Mauritz
- Cinematography: Hilmer Ekdahl
- Edited by: Tancred Ibsen
- Music by: Hugo Alfvén
- Production company: AB Irefilm
- Release date: October 22, 1934
- Running time: 81 minutes
- Country: Sweden

Synnöve Solbakken is a Swedish drama film from 1934 directed by Tancred Ibsen. The film script was written by Ibsen and Torsten Flodén. It is based on Bjørnstjerne Bjørnson's 1857 novel Synnøve Solbakken.

The film was shot at Irefilm's studios in Stockholm, and the outdoor scenes were shot in Vågå Municipality. Synnöve Solbakken premiered on October 22, 1934, at the Skandia cinema in Stockholm. The novel was adapted for film two other times in Sweden, in 1919 and in 1957.

== Plot ==
Torbjörn and Synnöve are two children living in the same valley. Synnöve's mother does not like them playing with each other because Torbjörn's grandfather drinks. They have both now grown up. Torbjörn is teased for having an alcoholic grandfather. This leads to fights, which Synnöve wants him to stop. During a fight, Torbjörn is stabbed in the back and paralyzed. He asks Synnöve to seek another man and not commit herself to a cripple. One day he sees his father's carriage overturn and, distressed by the event, he suddenly get up for the first time since the paralysis. A miracle has happened, and he can finally have his beloved.

== Cast ==
- Karin Ekelund as Synnöve Solbakken
- Fritiof Billquist as Torbjörn Granliden
- Helge Mauritz as Knut Nordhaug
- Gösta Gustafson as Aslak
- Victor Sjöström as Sämund Granliden
- Signe Lundberg-Settergren as Ingeborg Granliden
- Solveig Hedengran as Ingrid Granliden
- John Ekman as Guttorm Solbakken
- Hjördis Petterson as Karen Solbakken
- Justus Hagman as the doctor
- Ulla Wessman as Synnöve as a child
- Nils Granberg as Torbjörn as a child
- Törje Reuter as Knut as a child

== Norwegian version ==
At the same time as the Swedish version of the film, a Norwegian version was made, in which Karin Ekelund was replaced by Randi Brænne.
