= Som du vill ha mej =

- Directed by: Gösta Cederlund
- Written by: Kid Bruncrona
- Based on: Tancred Ibsen's film script for The Dangerous Game, in turn based on Alex Brinchmann's play Karusell
- Produced by: Bengt Janzon
- Starring: Karin Ekelund; Lauritz Falk; Stig Järrel
- Cinematography: Karl-Erik Alberts
- Music by: Sven Rüno
- Production company: AB Svensk Talfilm
- Release date: March 15, 1943
- Running time: 81 minutes
- Country: Sweden

Som du vill ha mej (As You Want Me) is a Swedish romantic comedy film from 1943 directed by Gösta Cederlund. The script was written by Kid Bruncrona based on Tancred Ibsen's film script for The Dangerous Game, in turn based on Alex Brinchmann's play Karusell.

The film premiered in Sweden on March 15, 1943. Gustaf Wally appears in the film as a singer and dancer in one of his few film roles.

== Plot ==
The outgoing architect Gösta thinks that his wife Gunilla is a bit bored and boring as unlike him she does not prefer to party. Gösta asks his friend Fredrik, a doctor, for help. Fredrik is persuaded to test an invigorating injection on her. What they do not know is that Gunilla has overheard the entire conversation, and she decides to teach the gentlemen, in particular Gösta, a lesson. Gunilla changes in both character and appearance, and she begins a romance with a stylish conductor, all to make her husband jealous.

== Cast ==
- Karin Ekelund as Gunilla
- Lauritz Falk as Gösta the architect
- Stig Järrel as Fredrik, the doctor
- Georg Rydeberg as Stefan, the director
- Gösta Cederlund as Birger
- Marianne Löfgren as Mrs. Sandeman
- Gustaf Wally as the singer
- Karin Kavli as Sylvia, the opera singer
- Astrid Bodin as the servant
- Marianne Gyllenhammar as the secretary
- Cécile Ossbahr as the telephone operator
