= Synnöve Solbakken (1919 film) =

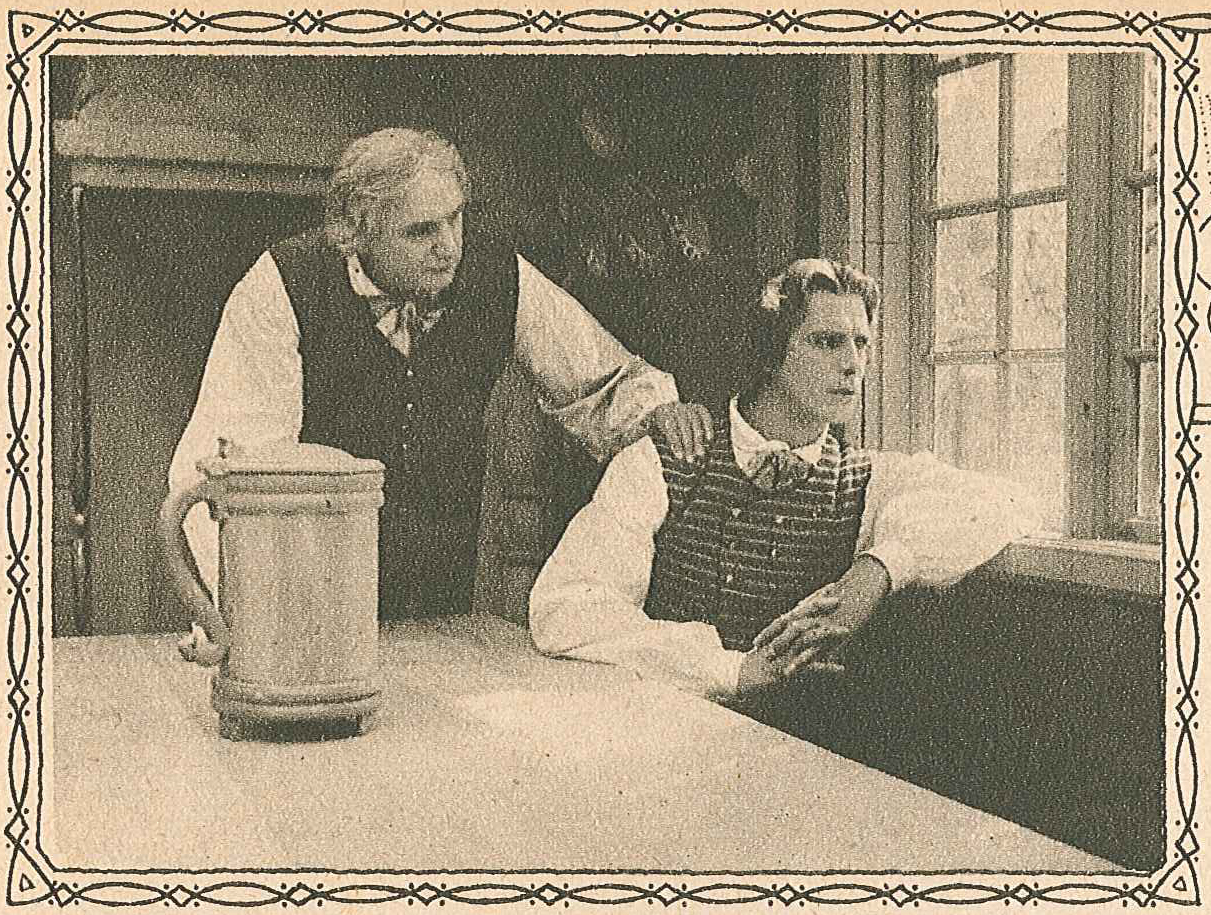
- Egil Eide as Sæmund and Lars Hanson as Thorbjörn
- Directed by: John W. Brunius
- Written by: John W. Brunius, Sam Ask
- Based on: Synnøve Solbakken by Bjørnstjerne Bjørnson
- Starring: Karin Molander; Lars Hanson; Egil Eide
- Cinematography: Hugo Edlund, Arthur Thorell
- Production company: Filmindustri AB Skandia
- Release dates: October 20, 1919 (Kinoen Metropol, Helsingborg, Sweden)
- Country: Sweden

Synnöve Solbakken is a Swedish silent film from 1919 directed by John W. Brunius. The screenplay was written by Brunius and Sam Ask. It is based on Bjørnstjerne Bjørnson's 1857 novel Synnøve Solbakken. The novel was adapted for film two additional times in Sweden (in 1934 and 1957).

== Filming ==
The film was shot in the summer of 1919 at the Skandiaateljén studio in the Långängen neighborhood of Stocksund, Sweden and in Sel Municipality in Norway's Gudbrandsdalen valley.

== Plot ==
Thorbjörn and Synnöve fall in love with each other as teenagers. Another boy interested in Synnöve incorrectly tells her father that Thorbjörn is a bully. Therefore, her parents consider Thorbjörn unfit for her. They do not meet for several years, and in the meantime Synnöve rejects many suitors. After Thorbjörn is stabbed with a knife, Synnöve's parents realize that he is not a bully after all, and they accept his proposal.

Synnöve Solbakken

== Cast ==
- Karin Molander: Synnöve Solbakken
- Lars Hanson: Thorbjörn Granliden
- Egil Eide: Sæmund Granlien, Thorbjörn's father
- Hjalmar Peters: Guttorm Solbakken, Synnöve's father
- Svea Peters: Ingebjörg Granlien, Thorbjörn's mother
- Ingrid Sandahl: Karen Solbakken, Synnöve's mother
- Einar Rød: Aslak, a farmhand at the Granliden farm
- Ellen Dall: Ingrid Granlien, Thorbjörn's sister
- Gösta Cederlund: Knud Nordhaug
- Torsten Bergström: Knud's friend
- Einar Bruun: Knud's friend
- Artur Cederborgh: Knud's friend
- Lisa Holm: the bride
- Justus Hagman: the doctor
- Palle Brunius: Thorbjörn as a child
- Solveig Hedengran: Synnöve as a child
- Local residents of the Gudbrand Valley: extras
