= Tore Wretman =

Swedish chef and restaurateur

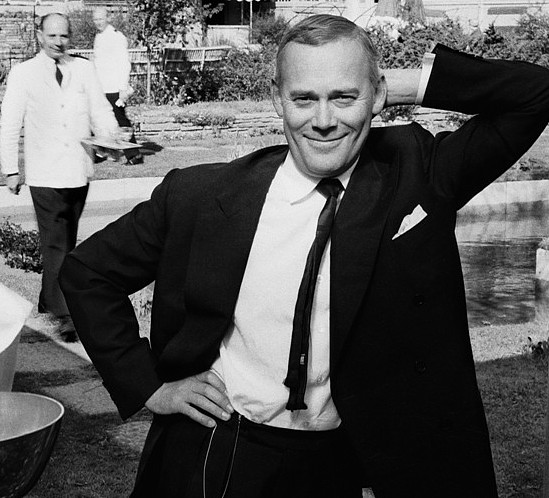
- Wretman in the early 1960s
- Born: Tore Fredrik Wretman; 7 May 1916; Stockholm, Sweden
- Died: 13 February 2003 (aged 86); Stockholm, Sweden

Tore Fredrik Wretman (7 May 1916 – 13 February 2003) was a Swedish chef and restaurateur. Wretman is perhaps best known for helping to popularize cooking to men in Sweden, and his work as a restaurateur founding several of Stockholm's most popular restaurants. He is also known for creating Toast Skagen.

== Biography ==
=== Early years ===
Wretman was born in Stockholm to writer Harald Wretman and Helga Nordström. He was the nephew of writer Tora Nordström-Bonnier. His parents divorced when Wretman was very young, and he spent part of his childhood at a children's home. This was revealed in the documentary Tore Wretman – kökspojken broadcast on Sweden's national public television broadcaster SVT in 2015.

=== Apprenticeships and Second World War ===
Wretman did not succeed in school, and at the age of sixteen he began apprenticing in the kitchen at the Hotel Continental in Stockholm. A year later he started working as a waiter at Operabaren in Operakällaren. There he met wine importer Fredrik König, who subsequently got him a job at Maxim's in Paris, in 1933. At Maxim's he learned the basics in the kitchen and was an apprentice under chef Louis Barth and restaurant owner Albert Baser. He worked as commis saucier and poissonnier.

In 1937, Wretman worked as head of the bar at the restaurant Soleil de Minuit in the Swedish pavilion at the Exposition Internationale des Arts et Techniques dans la Vie Moderne. There he became acquainted with Sara Reuterskiöld, who was about to open the restaurant Regnbågen; she hired Wretman as head chef. He got the opportunity to introduce French cuisine on the menu. His position at Regnbågen was short-lived as in 1937 he was drafted into the Svea Life Guards infantry regiment.

After his army duty, Wretman spent a few years in the United States. In 1941, he started working on the Finnish cargo ship SS Winha, so he could return to Sweden via Finland. The ship was boarded north of Iceland by the British navy and was brought to Kirkwall on the Orkney islands. Afterwards Wretman was brought to a camp in London and was ultimately released. Because of the ongoing war in Europe, he was unable to return to Sweden. He obtained a job as a receptionist at a London hotel, where he stayed until 1943 when he finally had the chance to return to Sweden.

=== Later life ===
In 1943 and 1944, Wretman worked as head waiter at Operakällaren in Stockholm. In 1945, at the age of 29, he bought the restaurant Riche on Birger Jarlsgatan. The restaurant was in bad shape after the war years, so Wretman set about to make several big changes. The pillar sections were halved, and its entrance was built on Nybrogatan, where Wretman opened his second restaurant Teatergrillen, which soon became one of Stockholm's most popular restaurants.

Five years later, Wretman took over the Stallmästaregården restaurant, which became one of the most renowned restaurants in the country after only a short time. In 1955, Wretman took over Operakällaren. After renovations and a complete overhaul, the restaurant was reopened in 1961, with Werner Vögeli as head chef. In 1971, Wretman did the same with Restaurant Victoria in Kungsträdgården.

Wretman later sold his restaurants and moved to Mougins on the French Riviera.

== Personal life ==
Wretman's first marriage, from 1945 to 1953, was to actress Lillebil Kjellén. The couple had two daughters—Ann-Sofie (born 1946) and Charlotta (born 1949). His daughter Ann-Sofie is a food writer.

His second marriage was from 1953 to 1971 to actress Meg Westergren. They had a son named Fredrik (born 1953) and a daughter named Malin (1956–1997).

He married flight attendant Ewa Wikmar in 1971. The couple had two children—Johan (born 1973) and Filip (born 1975). Together they ran a real estate business called Wretman Estate on the French Riviera.

== Legacy ==
Wretman played a big role in educating Swedes about the world of cuisine with his radio show Novisen vid spisen on Sveriges Radio. The radio show began broadcasting in 1950 and was hosted by journalist Folke Olhagen. The duo also presented segments on television meant to educate men about cooking and cuisine, a task that had previously been considered a woman's duty.

He is known to have introduced avocado and green pepper to the Swedish public, as well as prawns on toast, a dish which is better known as Toast Skagen.

He received an honorary PhD from Umeå University, as well as an honorary doctorate in gastronomy from the same university.

In 2002, Wretman was featured on a stamp in the series "Svensk Gastronomi".

== Bibliography ==
- Ur främmande grytor (1953)
- Menu (1958)
- Svensk husmanskost (1966)
- På tal om mat (1970)
- Bjudningsboken I (1973)
- Bjudningsboken II (1974)
- Smörgåsbordet (1976)
- The Swedish Smörgåsbord (1970)
- Festmeny (1980)
- Mat & minnen (1987)
- Om den ärbara vällusten (1988)
- Kökspojken (1996)
