= Chisago Lakes =

Area of Chisago County, Minnesota, US

Coordinates: 45°23′N 92°51′W

Chisago Lakes is an area of Chisago County, Minnesota, along Highway 8. The Chisago Lakes Area Chamber of Commerce includes the combined areas of Shafer, Center City, Chisago City, Almelund, Taylor's Falls, and Lindström.

== History ==
The Chisago Lakes Area is named from two Chippewa words "Kichi" meaning large, and "Saga" meaning fair or lovely. The Swedish called it "The Big Lake", as many of today's lakes were once one large lake. Swedish immigrants settled in the Chisago Lakes area in the mid-19th century. The area became a popular tourist area, with the lakes and railroad coming through. The Depression years dried up the lakes and the tourists. There was a growth of tourism in the late 1940s, as the lakes began to prosper once again.

== Cities ==
=== Chisago City ===
Originally platted in 1855, Chisago City was replatted at another location in 1892 and incorporated in 1906. Chisago City became a tourist resort destination after the 1880 railroad was built. Chisago City was home to Vilhelm Moberg during the summer of 1947, while he rode his bike through the area researching for what would become his four-volume saga of Swedish Immigrants in North America, The Emigrants suite: The Emigrants, Unto a Good Land, The Settlers and The Last Letter Home. The city has dedicated a park and a statue, housed in the park, to Vilhelm Moberg. Chisago City is sister city to Algutsboda, Sweden.

=== Center City ===
Center City was founded in 1851 and was the first permanent Swedish settlement in Minnesota. It became the county seat in 1875. The Chisago Lakes Lutheran Church was the first Swedish settled church in the area, being organized in 1854 in the barn of Per Berg. Highway 8 follows much of the old railroad bed through the city of Center City. Today, two blocks along Summit Avenue, including 18 homes, form a historic district listed on the National Register of Historic Places. Center City is sister city to Hassela, Sweden.

=== Lindström ===
Lindstrom, the biggest city in the Chisago Lakes region, has a sister-city relationship with Tingsryd, Sweden. The city was established in 1894 after being planned in 1880 and named after Daniel Lindström, who hailed from Hassela, Hälsingland, Sweden. The city commemorates its history through celebrations that revolve around Karl Oskar and his wife, Kristina, fictional characters that represent the numerous immigrant families that settled in the "land of kichisaga" during the mid-19th century. These families had escaped from hardships in their native Småland, Sweden, to rebuild their lives in an unclaimed territory in America. A statue of Karl and Kristina serves as a symbol for the Swedish peasants who migrated over a century ago and settled in the Chisago Lakes region. Lindström is sister city to Tingsryd, Sweden.

=== Shafer ===
Shafer is a farming community and was once a potato hub. Shafer was first organized as part of Taylors Falls. In 1853 the town was renamed after a transient farm worker, Jacob Shafer, from Sweden. The Shafer community is proud of its heritage. Throughout the year, events are held in a "town square" type of atmosphere. Shafer is sister city to Nöbbele, Sweden

=== Taylors Falls ===
Taylors Falls was the location where the main characters of Vilhelm Moberg's Swedish novel The Emigrants first settled. It was adapted into a film, and later a musical called Kristina från Duvemåla.

=== Almelund ===
The village of Almelund was founded in 1887 by Swedish immigrant John Almquist.

== See also ==
- U.S. Highway 8
- Chisago Lakes School District
