= Kristina från Duvemåla =

Kristina Från Duvemåla
- Music: Benny Andersson
- Lyrics: Björn Ulvaeus (Swedish lyrics and English lyrics); Herbert Kretzmer (English lyrics)
- Book: Björn Ulvaeus
- Basis: The Emigrants by Vilhelm Moberg
- Productions: 1995 Malmö; 1996 Minneapolis In Concert; 1997 Gothenburg; 1998 Stockholm; 2001 Swedish Tour; 2006 New York Workshop; 2009 New York in Concert; 2010 London in Concert; 2012 Helsinki; 2014 Gothenburg; 2016 Norway in Concert; 2021 Bømlo; 2024 Lørenskog; 2025 Sundsvall

Kristina från Duvemåla ("Kristina from Duvemåla") is a Swedish musical written by former ABBA members Björn Ulvaeus (lyrics) and Benny Andersson (music). It is based on The Emigrants saga, a series of four novels by Swedish author Vilhelm Moberg detailing a family's poverty-driven migration from Sweden to America in the mid-19th century: The Emigrants (1949), Unto a Good Land (1952), The Settlers (1956), and The Last Letter Home (1959).

== History ==
The show premiered at the Malmö Opera and Music Theatre in Malmö, Sweden, on 7 October 1995. The audience gave it a 10-minute standing ovation, while the critics unanimously praised it. Martin Nyström of Dagens Nyheter wrote that Andersson and Ulvaeus "created a great Swedish musical that thematically touches on the great questions of our time" and compared Andersson's musicality with that of Schubert; while Svenska Dagbladet's Carl-Gunnar Åhlén concluded that Björn Ulvaeus "succeeded in presenting the drama without getting bogged down, despite its almost Wagnerian length." A few years later, however, Dagens Nyheter reviewer Marcus Boldemann wrote that "Kristina från Duvemåla is not an A-class musical work."

On 12 October 1996, the 90-minute (of a nearly four-hour score) concert version with the original cast was presented, in Swedish, in Minneapolis, Minnesota, as an opening event of the Plymouth Music Series 1996–1997 season in Orchestra Hall; and next day in Chisago Lakes High School in Lindstrom, Minnesota – the area where much of the events in Moberg's books took place and where the statue of the books' two main characters stands on the main street of the town.

The American premiere received a glowing review from Minneapolis Star and Tribune: "I have seen the future of the music theater, and its name is Kristina... Engaging, emotionally charged – and at times haunting – a piece of work capable of enchanting US viewers even when performed in a cut-down, concert version and in a tongue foreign to the audience"; while Helen Sjöholm who performed the role of Kristina was described as "extraordinary."

Time magazine later wrote that "the show has Swedes, Americans, Indians; a sacrificial whore and the death of a child; and – in case you think it sounds too solemn for your tastes – a bilingual fart joke... and it's one of the most ambitious swatches of musical theater (39 songs!) since Gershwin's 1935 "Porgy and Bess," with one of the most serious, lyrically seductive scores since Rodgers and Hammerstein were creating their midcentury, midcult epics."

Subsequently, the musical was staged at Gothenburg Opera and then premiered at the Stockholm's Cirkus that was specially renovated for it. This production won four 1998 Guldmasken Theatre Awards (Swedish equivalent of Tony Award). Counting all three runs, which were almost continuous, interrupted only by summer vacations and hiatuses due to the production's physical moving, Kristina från Duvemåla ran for nearly four years (more than 650 performances in total), making it the second longest running musical in Swedish history. In 2001, a touring concert staging was presented featuring most of the original performers recreating their previous roles. All three original Swedish productions were directed by Lars Rudolfsson with set design by Tony Award-winner Robin Wagner and musical direction by Anders Eljas.

The original cast triple CD set was released in 1996 and peaked at number two on the Swedish album chart, remaining on it for a total of 74 weeks and winning the 1996 Swedish Grammis Award as the best album. For a number of years, the song "Guldet blev till sand" (Gold Can Turn to Sand) performed by Peter Jöback held the distinction of having spent the longest amount of time on the national Swedish radio chart Svensktoppen.

By the mid-2000s, the show had been translated into English by Björn Ulvaeus and the Les Misérables English lyricist Herbert Kretzmer. English translations of individual songs have been presented at various concert performances throughout the last two or three years, mainly by Helen Sjöholm or Swedish musical theatre stalwart Tommy Körberg, always in association with Benny Andersson or Björn Ulvaeus.

== English-language version of the musical ==
=== In the US ===
In March 2006, a workshop was held in New York and featured Sara Chase as Kristina, Clarke Thorell as Karl Oskar, Kevin Odekirk as Robert and Alice Ripley as Ulrika, the latter performing the song "You Have to Be There" from the musical in her and Emily Skinner's 2006 show at The Town Hall in New York and later releasing this live recording on Raw at Town Hall 2-CD set.

At the time, there had been talk of a fall 2007 opening at The Broadway Theatre, but those plans never materialized partly due to a protracted legal battle over the use of the original book written for the musical.

The English-language premiere of the musical, in a concert version under the name "Kristina: A Concert Event," took place at Carnegie Hall on 23 and 24 September 2009, with Helen Sjöholm as Kristina, Russell Watson as Karl Oskar, Louise Pitre as Ulrika and Kevin Odekirk as Robert.

The performances received mixed reviews, from TIME commenting that "some of the most rapturous melodies ever heard in Carnegie Hall poured out of that grand old barn last night" to Variety concluding that "Moberg's series adds up to some 1,800 pages, and many in the restless Carnegie Hall audience may have felt they were sitting through all of them...U.S. audiences are likely to find Kristina's epic tale less than gripping." Talkin' Broadway critic Matthew Murray admitted: "It's a musical you don't just want to listen to: During the better portions of its score – of which there are many – you feel you have to...Andersson's work is so big, so thoroughly conceived, and so varied in style, tempo, and color that it often feels more like a symphony than a musical. Of course, making it one would mean jettisoning the specific story treatment and lyrics, losses most shows couldn't weather. But its music is so good that Kristina could be even more powerful as a result."

The Carnegie Hall concert recordings were released on a 2-CD set by Decca Records on 12 April 2010.

=== In the UK ===
Kerry Ellis premiered the song "You Have to Be There" in its English-language version, at Thank You for the Music, a special event celebrating the music of Benny Andersson and Björn Ulvaeus on 13 September 2009. The song is featured on her debut album Anthems (2010) produced by Brian May. She has since sung the song at various live events, including Anthems: The Tour (2011).

The UK premiere of the musical, also in a concert version, took place at the Royal Albert Hall on 14 April 2010.

Similarly to the US, it received a mixed critical response. "The inspiration for both score and lyrics feels more like a retread of the worst excesses of Les Misérables (a fact amplified here by sharing the English lyricist of that show, Herbert Kretzmer) and Frank Wildhorn, with the occasional Lloyd Webber rock riff thrown in for good measure," wrote The Stage, while The Times concluded that "the piece displayed moments of musical power. But it will need major restructuring if it is to work on the theatrical stage... if it showed gleams of promise, this concert also emphasised that Kristina still has a long road to travel before any of us is truly moved to say thank you for the music."

Contrary to these opinions, chief classical music and opera critic for The Independent, Edward Seckerson wrote a highly sympathetic review of the performance, calling Benny Andersson "a composer/melodist of startling distinction." He suggested that "this one-off concert performance...presented only its bare bones, a series of musical snapshots from a much larger whole... So dramatically sketchy, musically sumptuous. But Andersson's gorgeous folk-sourced melodies (like a Swedish Grieg) spirited us forward from one accordion-flecked knees-up and effusive ballad to the next... If ever a piece sung a nation's pride, this is it."

== Original cast (1995–1999) ==
- Kristina – Helen Sjöholm
- Karl Oskar – Anders Ekborg
- Robert – Peter Jöback
- Ulrika – Åsa Bergh
- Fina-Kajsa – Marianne Mörck
- Danjel – Tommy Juth
- Arvid – Lars Leishem

Replacement performers included Frida Bergh (Kristina), Joakim Jennefors (Karl Oskar), Niklas Andersson (Robert), Lisa Gustafsson (Kristina) and Christer Nerfont (Robert).

== Helsinki, Gothenburg and Stockholm cast (2012–2015) ==
- Kristina – Maria Ylipää
- Karl Oskar – Robert Noack
- Robert – Oskar Nilsson
- Ulrika – Birthe Wingren
- Fina Kajsa – Veronika Mattsson / Helen Elde
- Danjel – Kent Sjöman
- Arvid – Ingemar Raukola

== Norway, Norwegian premiere concert cast (2016) ==
On 9 September 2016, the concert version with a Norwegian cast (but sung in Swedish) was presented at Lillestrøm Kultursenter, Lillestrøm. It was later presented at Lørenskog Hus, Lørenskog, and at Ullensaker Kulturhus, Jessheim. The entire run was sold out and got rave reviews in the press. The Romerike symphony Orchestra and St. Laurentius choir was conducted by Anders Eljas who was also musical director for this production.

- Kristina – Reidun Sæther
- Karl Oskar – Espen Grjotheim
- Robert – Sigurd Marthinussen
- Ulrika – Kirsti Lucena Andersen
- Fina Kajsa – Hege Schøyen
- Danjel – Christian Ranke
- Arvid – Morten Gjerløw Larsen

== Bømlo Teater, Norwegian premiere, fully staged version (2021) ==
In August 2021, the first fully staged production was played on the outdoor stage at Bømlo Teater in Bømlo Municipality on the west coast of Norway. The version was the same as the one developed for the Helsinki production. It was played for the first time in Norwegian, translated by Runa Våge Krukhaug. The production was directed by Jostein Kirkeby-Garstad, and conducted by musical director Gunvald Ottesen.

- Kristina – Christine Guldbrandsen
- Karl Oskar – André Søfteland
- Robert – Anders Gjønnes
- Ulrika – Mareike Wang
- Fina Kajsa – Britt Synnøve Johanssen
- Danjel – Espen Hana
- Arvid – Håkon Kvarven Paulsen

== Lørenskog Hus (fully staged) and Oslo concert version (2024) ==
In October 2024, will premiere both a fully staged production at Lørenskog hus just outside Oslo Norway and the concert version in Oslo later in the year. The version was the same as the one developed for the Helsinki production, and was later done at Bømlo Teater. The production will be directed by Ola Beskow, choreographed by Simen Gloppen and conducted by musical director Anders Eljas. The whole cast will later do the concert version at Oslo konserthus with the only cast change being Herborg Kråkevik as the narrator/Fina Kajsa, and Espen Grotheim as Robert.

- Kristina – Sanne Kvitnes
- Karl Oskar – Anders Gjønnes
- Robert – Max Graarud
- Ulrika – Solveig Andsnes
- Fina Kajsa – Elise Hellem Ratvik
- Danjel – Christian Ranke
- Arvid – Frikk Hana

== Plot ==
Prologue

For 25 years Nils has worked with an iron rod to move stones from the fields of his farm Korpamoen in Ljuder's parish, Småland, Sweden. One day he slips and a big rock rolls onto him, breaking both his hip and femur. As a cripple he cannot work and is forced to sell the farm. His oldest son, Karl Oskar, barely of age, convinces Nils to sell the farm to him, and he buys it for 1700 riksdaler.

Act I

Karl Oskar visits his girlfriend Kristina, who waits for him and pictures him making his way through the familiar surroundings ("Duvemåla Pasture"). Karl Oskar tells her that he has bought his father's farm, and can now marry her ("My Lust For You"). They marry and begin a life together, but times are hard because of bad harvests (King of Stone's Kingdom). Kristina worries that they cannot support their growing family, and suggests to her husband that they take steps to prevent another pregnancy. Karl Oskar says that it would be a betrayal of his love for her.

Karl Oskar's younger brother, Robert, is on his way to begin work as a farm hand on a nearby farm. He stops by a stream and wishes he was as free as the water ("Out Towards a Sea").

Kristina is pregnant again, and she and Karl Oskar worry that they won't be able to feed their children during winter, because of a drought and bad harvest. An angry Karl Oskar tells God that since he took their hay last year, he might as well take the rest. Shortly thereafter lightning strikes the barn, setting it on fire. Kristina tells her husband that he got what he wished for ("Bad Harvest").

Young Arvid, who works as a farmhand beside Robert at the farm of Nybacken, is unjustly punished by his mistress; in desperation, he sets out to kill her with an axe, but Robert stops him. The two boys dream of a better world, a world across the ocean, called North America, which Robert has read about.

Kristina loves her home, and is happy to be married to Karl Oskar and have their three children (Blåklintstäcket/Kristina's Apple Tree). One day Robert returns home, having been beaten by his master. He refuses to go back, and asks for his share of the inheritance so he can leave Sweden and travel to North America. Karl Oskar confesses that he has been considering the same thing; he and Robert try to convince Kristina that she will love America, but she is too afraid ("No"). Kristina asks her beloved Uncle, Danjel, to help her change her husband's mind. In a dream, Danjel has a vision where he is called to fulfill his uncle's work of restoring God's Kingdom on earth and to lead the people away from the false teachings. One night he gathers a group of outcasts to celebrate communion ("Little Group"); the gathering is disrupted by the Provost and the local authorities, who scatter the group and intend to bring them all to justice for breaking the law. One of the persons in the room, Ulrika of Västergöhl, a former prostitute who is now born again through Christ and lives in Danjel's house, is furious over the hypocrisy of their persecutors, one of whom used to be her customer. Ulrika vows that her illegitimate daughter Elin will never have to suffer because her mother was a whore ("Never").

Kristina, and Karl Oskar's parents, try to convince him to stay, pointing out the advantages of home ("Golden Wheat Fields"). When Kristina makes christening porridge for the new baby, their starving oldest daughter (Anna) eats it, but the grain swells in her stomach, and she dies ("Come To Me Everyone"). Realising that the poverty in Sweden is just as dangerous as anything overseas, Kristina agrees to move. They visit the Provost and write down their reasons for emigrating in the church book. The provost warns them of all the horrors waiting in America, saying that God will wipe America off the face of the earth within fifty years. The emigrants begin their journey. Karl Oskar, Kristina, their children and Robert have gained some companions; Danjel and his family are moving to escape religious persecution, along with Ulrika and her daughter, and so is Arvid, who has also been living with Danjel. A group of 16 people leaves Ljuder, never to return ("We Open Up the Gateways.")

The ship turns out to be smaller than they had thought it would be. Karl Oskar must bunk with the bachelors. For the first time in their marriage, Kristina and Karl Oskar are separated ("Farmers at Sea"). One day Kristina discovers lice on her body. She is horrified, since she has never had them before in her life, and blames Ulrika, who has none ("Lice"). An old woman on the ship, Fina-Kajsa, is traveling to find her son in America, carrying a big grindstone because she has heard grindstones are very expensive in America. Fina-Kajsa tells the story of how lice came to be.

One night in the middle of a storm Karl Oskar is woken by his oldest son, Johan, who tells him that his mother is bleeding. Kristina, pregnant with her fifth child, has fallen ill with scurvy. The captain does what he can to help her, and Karl Oskar sits by her side, waking through the longest night of his life ("Stay"). When morning finally comes Kristina is alive, but Danjel's wife, who has been ill for a long time without telling her husband, has died ("Burial at Sea"). Fina-Kajsa has a letter from her son, saying that he has plowed 100 acres of fields with good soil. Karl Oskar asks where this is, and Fina-Kajsa reads: "Taylors Falls, Minnesota." Easy to remember, Karl Oskar points out ("Minne" meaning "memory" in Swedish).

On Midsummer's Eve land is finally spotted, after two and a half months on the ocean. The sight of all the New Yorkers out for a Sunday walk overwhelms the immigrants, and so does the foreign language ("A Sunday in Battery Park"). An apple given by one friendly lady to the children reminds Kristina of home. Johan asks if they can go home now. Kristina remembers her motherland, where they now are celebrating midsummer ("Home"). The group travels by train and steamboat, amazed at how wide America is ("Travel Through America"). At a land grab Karl Oskar's and Kristina's daughter Lill-Märta disappears. At the last moment, when the paddle steamer already started moving, Ulrika finds Märta and returns the girl to her parents.

One night the immigrants are left on a pier in Stillwater. It is dark and rainy, and no one understands what they say; they are completely abandoned, until Baptist pastor Henry O Jackson shows up and offers the immigrants shelter, warmth and food. As Danjel prays, thanking the Lord for the food, they find out that they have a word in common: "Amen." Robert tells his friend Arvid of his plans to go on the California trail and dig for gold and asks him to come along. Karl Oskar is highly skeptical, but his brother is firmly set on leaving ("The Dream of Gold"). The women are amazed by how Pastor Jackson handles household chores, and begin to understand that women are more equal in this country. The immigrants struggle to communicate with Reverend Jackson ("To Think That Men Like Him Can Exist").

Karl Oskar and Kristina continue to Lake Ki-Chi-Saga, where they intend to build their new home. Here, with help from Ulrika, Kristina gives birth to a healthy son. Karl Oskar reads the Christmas Gospel for his little family, and Kristina tells her new-born child about the land where she was born, and of her astrakan apple tree which is still carrying fruit ("My Astrakan").

Act II

A few years have passed by. The settlers gather and celebrate their choice to move to this New World ("The Superiors"). But Kristina lies awake at night, tormented by her longing for Sweden, and begs God to let her return ("Bright Evenings in Springtime"). Karl Oskar tells her that if God tries to move her back he will reach out his hand and keep her by his side. He shows her the boots that belonged to their daughter Anna, and reminds her why they left Sweden. He plans to write to her father and ask for some seeds from her astrakan tree, in the hope that a new tree planted at their new settlement will help her feel at home.

When Christmas comes Karl Oskar has bought Kristina a new stove, called the Queen of the Prairie. Their friends gather at New Duvemåla to celebrate Christmas, and they all marvel at the new stove ("The Queen of the Prairie"). The fun gathering is disrupted when Karl Oskar gets into a fight with Nöjd, a fur hunter, who tells Karl Oskar that he does not own the land he farms, which is stolen from the Indians. Karl Oskar describes his plight back home in Sweden, and tells Nöjd how hard he has worked to turn the wild grass on his property into a home and a farm ("Wild Grass").

One evening in June, a strange man is spotted down at the lake shore. Robert has come back from the gold fields. Arvid is not with him, but Robert has a lot of money, which Karl Oskar deposits at the bank. Kristina finds Arvid's watch and demands to know where Arvid is. Robert tells her that he eventually reconciled to his fate and then tells her the story of how they went searching for gold, but ended up lost in the desert. Arvid drank poisoned water and died ("Robert's Story"). The money Robert gives to Karl Oskar turns out to be counterfeit. Karl Oskar becomes furious ("Wild Cat Money"), believing that his brother knew this. Robert walks out to the woods where he finds a lonely stream, the symbol of the freedom he never found. He has caught yellow fever, and by the stream he dies ("Out Towards a Sea (Reprise)").

Karl Oskar and Kristina plant seeds in their new farmlands, and a great wheat field is grown ("The Field"), along with Kristina's apple tree, planted from seeds from home.

Back in Sweden Ulrika was a whore and no respectable man would look at her twice. Now she tells Kristina she has had several suitors ("Won't You Marry Me?") and has decided to marry Pastor Jackson, with whom she has been in love since they met; she will convert to Baptism. Kristina and Ulrika cherish their friendship ("A Miracle of the Lord"). Kristina comes to watch her friend being baptised by Pastor Jackson ("Down to the Sacred Wave").

Kristina suffers a miscarriage and Ulrika takes her to the doctor, then brings Karl Oskar the bad news that, after her miscarriage, Kristina's body cannot take much more. Another childbirth would mean her death ("Miscarriage"). A devastated Kristina thinks of all the bad things that have happened to her, having to leave her home, losing her child and now her husband's love. She desperately prays to God, not knowing what she will do if he isn't real ("You Have To Be There").

As time passes, Kristina begins to feel better. One day the settlers gather for a big harvest feast ("Harvest Feast"), and she tells Uncle Danjel of her wish to live long enough to see her children grow up. She also tells him about her apple tree, which finally is blooming and will give fruits to the autumn. After the feast Kristina tries to convince Karl Oskar that it is God's meaning that husband and wife should be together, and that if God wants her to live she will live, but if He wants her to die He will take her regardless. Karl Oskar argues, until she repeats the words he said to her so many years ago ("Here You Have Me Again").

During the civil war, the state of Minnesota gets a civil war of its own, an Indian uprising. Chaos, murder and violence begin to spread ("Red Iron/The Sioux uprising") at the same time as Kristina finds out that she is once again carrying a child. She tells Karl Oskar, who is worried. She turns to God and asks for help to comfort him, since she is so weak and tired herself ("Help Me Comfort"). The settlers have to leave their homes as the uprising spreads ("Where Do We Belong?"). Karl Oskar sends the children away with Danjel, but cannot leave himself because Kristina has miscarried again, and lies dying in her bed.

Karl Oskar is the only settler remaining in St. Croix Valley, but the apples on the Astrakan tree have finally matured. Karl Oskar gives Kristina the first of the ripe apples, and she smells it. She tells Karl Oskar not to grieve, saying she will be waiting for him at Duvemåla Pasture, as she used to ("I'll Be Waiting There"). Kristina then dies peacefully in her husband's arms.

== Music numbers in the original set ==
(English translations in parentheses)

=== Act I ===
- Prolog – Orkester, Nils, Märta, Karl Oskar, Robert
- Duvemåla hage (Path of Leaves and Needles) – Kristina
- Min lust till dig/Wedding (Where You Go I Go With You) – Kristina, Karl Oskar, Ensemble
- Kung i stenrike (Stone Kingdom) – Kristina, Karl Oskar
- Robert vid bäcken (Down to the Sea) – Robert
- Missväxt (A Bad Harvest) – Kristina, Karl Oskar, Anna, Ensemble
- Bröderna vill åka till Nordamerika (No!) – Karl Oskar, Robert, Kristina
- Bönemötet (He's Our Pilot) – Danjel, Inga-Lena, Ulrika, Elin, Arvid, others
- Aldrig (Never) – Ulrika
- Om ett fat korngrynsgröt (Golden Wheat Fields/All Who Are Grieving) – Kristina, Karl Oskar, Nils, Märta, Ensemble
- Vi öppnar alla grindar (We Open Up the Gateways) – Brusander, Kristina, Karl Oskar, Robert, Ulrika, Danjel, Ensemble
- Bönder på havet (Peasants at Sea) – Ensemble
- Löss (Lice) – Ulrika, Kristina, Fina-Kajsa, Ensemble
- Kristina nära döden (In The Dead of Darkness) – Karl Oskar
- Begravning till sjöss (Funeral at Sea) – Captain Lorentz, others
- Battery Park – New York (A Sunday in Battery Park) – Ensemble, Danjel, Robert, Fina-Kajsa, Ulrika
- Hemma (Home) – Kristina
- Resan i Amerika/Från New York till Stillwater – Ensemble, Danjel
- Hemma hos Pastor Jackson (Dreams of Gold) – Robert, Arvid, Karl Oskar
- Tänk att män som han kan finnas (American Man) – Kristina, Ulrika, Elin, Fina-Kajsa
- Modern och barnet (Summer Rose) – Kristina

=== Act II ===
- Överheten (Emperors and Kings) – Ensemble, Ulrika, Danjel, Fina-Kajsa, Karl Oskar, Kristina
- Ljusa kvällar om våren (Twilight Images Calling) – Kristina, Karl Oskar, Anna with angels
- Präriens drottning (Queen of the Prairie) – The children, Karl Oskar, Kristina, Ensemble
- Vildgräs (Wild Grass) – Karl Oskar
- Robert kommer tillbaka (Robert's story/Gold Can Turn To Sand) – Robert, Kristina, lill-Märta
- Wild Cat Money – Karl Oskar, Robert
- Robert vid bäcken – repris (Down to the Sea – Reprise) – Robert
- Åkern (The fields grow) – Orchestra, Kristina, Karl Oskar
- Ulrikas tre friare – Ulrika, Kristina, Nöjd, Abbott, Thomassen
- Ett herrans underverk (Miracle of God) – Ulrika, Kristina
- Dop (Down to the Waterside) – Ensemble, Pastor Jackson, Ulrika
- Missfall (Miscarriage) – Ulrika, Karl Oskar
- Du måste finnas (You Have to Be There) – Kristina
- Skördefest – Orchestra, Karl Oskar, Ulrika, Danjel, Kristina
- Här har du mig Igen (Here I Am Again) – Kristina, Karl Oskar
- Red Iron/Hjälp mig trösta (Sioux rise/With Child Again) – Red Iron, Kristina
- De flyendes kör (Rising from the Myth and Legend) – Ensemble
- Slutet (I'll Be Waiting There) – Kristina, Karl Oskar

== Kristina: A Concert Event (2009 English language version) ==
On 23 and 24 September 2009, Benny Andersson, Björn Ulvaeus, Ki-Chi-Saga and Universal Music presented "Kristina: A Concert Event"; Music by Benny Andersson; Lyrics by Björn Ulvaeus and Herbert Kretzmer. The concert took place at Carnegie Hall.

Act One

- Overture
- Path of Leaves and Needles
- Where You Go I Go With You
- Stone Kingdom
- Down to the Sea
- A Bad Harvest
- No!
- He's Our Pilot
- Never
- Golden Wheat Fields
- All Who Are Grieving
- We Open Up the Gateways
- Peasants at Sea
- Lice
- In The Dead of Darkness
- A Sunday in Battery Park
- Home
- American Man
- Dreams of Gold
- Summer Rose

Act Two

- Emperors and Kings
- Twilight Images Calling
- Queen of the Prairie
- Wild Grass
- Gold Can Turn To Sand
- Wildcat Money
- To The Sea
- Miracle of God
- Down to the Waterside
- Miscarriage
- You Have to Be There
- Here I Am Again
- With Child Again
- Rising from the Myth and Legend
- I'll Be Waiting There

Note: In the Playbill for the concert the song "Summer Rose" was listed as a reprise at the end of Act Two but was not performed at either of the two concerts.

The cast featured:

- Kristina – Helen Sjöholm
- Karl Oskar – Russell Watson
- Ulrika – Louise Pitre
- Robert – Kevin Odekirk
- Daniel – David Hess
- Brusander – Robert Ousley
- Arvid – Greg Stone
- Fina-Kajsa – Joy Hermalyn
- Jackson – Walter Charles
- Nojd – Raymond Jaramillo McLeod
- Ensemble – Derin Altay, Chris Bohannan, Jane Brockman, Walter Charles, Rebecca Eichenberger, Osborn Focht, Blythe Gruda, Liz Griffith, Joy Hermalyn, David Hess, Michael James Leslie, T. Doyle Leverett, Rob Lorey, Frank Mastrone, Raymond Jaramillo McLeod, Linda Mugleston, Jan Neuberger, Robert Ousley, Sal Sabella, Wayne Schroder, Greg Stone, Jessica Vosk, Kathy Voytko
- Understudies – For Kristina: Kathy Voytko; For Karl Oskar: David Hess

American Theatre Orchestra

Music director and conductor: Paul Gemignani

Director: Lars Rudolfsson

== Music (1995 original cast recording) ==
The song titles are the original Swedish ones. The titles in parentheses are the titles directly translated into English.

Act One

- "Prolog"
- "Duvemåla hage" (Duvemåla Pasture)
- "Min lust till dig" (My Desire for You)
- "Ut mot ett hav" (Out to a Sea)
- "Missväxt" (Bad Harvest)
- "Nej" (No)
- "Lilla skara" (Little Group)
- "Aldrig" (Never)
- "Kom till mig alla" (Come to Me, Everyone)
- "Vi öppnar alla grindar" (We Open All the Gates)
- "Bönder på havet" (Peasants at Sea)
- "Löss" (Lice)
- "Stanna" (Stay)
- "Begravning till sjöss" (Burial at Sea)
- "A Sunday in Battery Park"
- "Hemma" (Home)
- "Från New York till Stillwater" (From New York to Stillwater)
- "Tänk att män som han kan finnas" (To Think that Men Like Him Exist)
- "Kamfer och lavendel" (Camphor and Lavender)
- "Drömmen om guld" (The Dream of Gold)
- "Min astrakan" (My Astrakan [Apple Tree])

Act Two

- "Överheten" (The Superiors)
- "Ljusa kvällar om våren" (Bright Evenings in Springtime)
- "Präriens Drottning" (The Queen of the Prairie)
- "Vildgräs" (Wild Grass)
- "Jag har förlikat mig till slut" (I Have Resigned at Last)
- "Guldet blev till sand" (The Gold Turned into Sand)
- "Wild Cat Money"
- "Ut mot ett hav (repris)" (Out to a Sea (Reprise))
- "Vill du inte gifta dig med mig?" (Won't You Marry Me?)
- "Ett Herrans underverk" (A Miracle of the Lord)
- "Down to the Sacred Wave"
- "Missfall" (Miscarriage)
- "Du måste finnas" (You Must Exist)
- "Skördefest" (Harvest Feast)
- "Här har du mig igen" (Here You Have Me Again)
- "Red Iron"/"Hjälp mig trösta" (Red Iron/Help Me Comfort)
- "Var hör vi hemma?" (Where Do We Belong?)
- "I gott bevar" (In Good Keeping)
