= Ride This Night (disambiguation) =

Ride This Night (Swedish:Rid i natt) is a 1941 Swedish novel by Vilhelm Moberg.

Ride This Night or Rid i natt may also refer to:

- Ride Tonight!, a 1942 Swedish film directed by Gustaf Molander based on the novel
- Ride This Night (TV series), a 1985 Swedish TV series based on Ride This Night
