= The Emigrants (1971 film) =

1971 Swedish film

- American theatrical release poster
- Utvandrarna
- Directed by: Jan Troell
- Screenplay by: Jan Troell; Bengt Forslund
- Based on: The Emigrants and Unto a Good Land by Vilhelm Moberg
- Produced by: Bengt Forslund
- Starring: Max von Sydow; Liv Ullmann; Eddie Axberg; Allan Edwall; Monica Zetterlund; Pierre Lindstedt
- Cinematography: Jan Troell
- Edited by: Jan Troell
- Music by: Erik Nordgren
- Production company: Svensk Filmindustri
- Distributed by: Svensk Filmindustri (Scandinavia); Warner Bros. (International)
- Release date: 8 March 1971 (Sweden)
- Running time: 192 minutes
- Country: Sweden
- Language: Swedish
- Budget: $1.6 million

The Emigrants (Swedish: Utvandrarna) is a 1971 Swedish drama film directed and co-written by Jan Troell, and starring Max von Sydow, Liv Ullmann, Eddie Axberg, Allan Edwall, Monica Zetterlund, and Pierre Lindstedt. It and its 1972 sequel, The New Land (Nybyggarna), which were produced concurrently, are based on Vilhelm Moberg's The Emigrants, a series of novels about poor Swedes who emigrate from Småland, Sweden, in the mid-19th century and make their home in Minnesota. This film adapts the first two of the four novels–The Emigrants (1949) and Unto a Good Land (1952)–which depict the hardships the emigrants experience in Sweden and on their journey to America.

The Emigrants won international acclaim and was nominated for the Academy Award for Best Foreign Language Film at the 44th Academy Awards. It was nominated for four more Oscars the following year, including for Best Picture, the same year that The New Land was nominated for Best Foreign Language Film. The 1974 American television series The New Land is loosely based on both The Emigrants and its sequel.

== Plot ==
In 1844, the Nilsson family lives on a small farm in Korpamoen in Ljuder Parish in the Swedish province of Småland. Eldest son, Karl Oskar, runs the farm after his father, Nils, is injured. Karl Oskar marries Kristina Johansdotter. In the following years, Karl Oskar and Kristina have four children, Anna, Johan, Märta and Harald. The family struggles with rock-filled fields, poor weather, and bad harvests, leaving them hungry and in debt. Kristina rebukes Karl Oskar for his irreligious attitude, partially blaming it for causing their problems.

Karl Oskar's daydreaming and bookish younger brother, Robert, tired of being overworked and regularly beaten as an indentured farmhand at Aron's farm, reads about how wonderful America is and decides to emigrate. He asks Arvid, his fellow farmhand, to come with him. Arvid agrees, but their hopes are dashed upon realizing they are unable to afford passage. Robert wants to sell his share of the family farm to Karl Oskar, only to learn that Karl Oskar has also considered going to America. Despite the potential for a better life, Kristina is unenthusiastic, not wanting to leave her homeland and concerns about the arduous journey. However, when daughter Anna dies after gorging on uncooked porridge that ruptures her stomach, a devastated Kristina agrees to Karl Oskar's plan to leave Sweden.

Meanwhile, Danjel Andreasson, Kristina's uncle, is being persecuted by Brusander, the local provost, for rejecting the official religion and holding fundamentalist religious services at his home. He and his wife, Inga-Lena, and their four young children are exiled, so they join Karl Oskar in his move to America. Ulrika of Västergöhl, a former prostitute who is one of Danjel's followers, and her illegitimate sixteen-year-old daughter, Elin, also join them, and Jonas Petter, a neighbor, is interested to escape his unhappy marriage. Robert is able to persuade Danjel to hire Arvid and pay his fare. Before their departure, Kristina tells Karl Oskar she is pregnant.

The emigrants travel to Karlshamn and board the wooden brig Charlotta, bound for New York City. On board, Karl Oskar and Kristina meet Måns and Fina-Kajsa Andersson, an elderly couple heading for the Minnesota Territory to settle on their son Anders' farm near a town called Taylor's Falls. After hearing how good the land is there, Karl Oskar and Kristina decide to follow them. During the voyage, Inga-Lena and Måns Andersson die of unrelated sudden illnesses, and Kristina nearly dies from a severe nosebleed.

Upon arrival in New York, Karl Oskar and his party, along with Fina-Kajsa, travel westward to Minnesota, first by train, and then by riverboat. Throughout the whole journey from Sweden, the pious Kristina has been prejudiced against Ulrika for her past immorality, but they reconcile after Ulrika finds Kristina's missing child at a riverboat stop who was almost left behind. Soon after, while still on the riverboat, Danjel's infant daughter dies after a brief illness.

After finally arriving at the town of Stillwater, the party, with help from Pastor Jackson, a friendly Baptist minister, finds their way to Anders' farm in what is now known as the Chisago Lakes area. He lives in a wooden shack, but the land is fertile, and Danjel and Jonas Petter choose fine farmland tracts nearby. Karl Oskar, however, heads deep into the woods to explore the lands along the shore of Lake Ki Chi Saga that he hears are even better. Upon arrival, he finds the topsoil is excellent and stakes a claim by carving his name into a tree overlooking the lake.

== Cast ==
- Max von Sydow as Karl Oskar Nilsson
- Liv Ullmann as Kristina Nilsson
- Eddie Axberg as Robert Nilsson
- Sven-Olof Bern as Nils, Karl Oskar and Robert's father
- Aina Alfredsson as Märta, Karl Oskar and Robert's mother
- Allan Edwall as Danjel Andreasson, Kristina's uncle
- Monica Zetterlund as Ulrika
- Pierre Lindstedt as Arvid
- Hans Alfredson as Jonas Petter
- Ulla Smidje as Inga-Lena Andreasson, Danjel's wife
- Eva-Lena Zetterlund as Elin, Ulrika's daughter
- Gustaf Färingborg as Brusander, the provost
- Åke Fridell as Aron
- Agneta Prytz as Fina-Kajsa
- Halvar Björk as Anders Månsson, Måns and Fina-Kajsa's son
- Arnold Alfredsson as Verger
- Bror Englund as Måns Jakob
- Tom C. Fouts as Pastor Jackson
- Bruno Sörwing as Sherriff Lönnegren

== Production ==
=== Development ===
Plans for adapting The Emigrants novels began late in 1967. Its author, Vilhelm Moberg, had seen Jan Troell's film Here Is Your Life before producer Bengt Forslund approached him about an Emigrants film. SF Studios wished to adapt all four novels, although it was uncertain how such a film structure would work.

Moberg requested Forslund and Troell meet him, and the three men mapped out a plot, with 98 scenes, finishing in March 1968. They also envisioned Max von Sydow, Liv Ullmann and Eddie Axberg as the ideal stars. Troell and Forslund went location scouting in the United States in September 1968, but found many of the lands were too developed or could not accommodate film equipment.

=== Filming ===
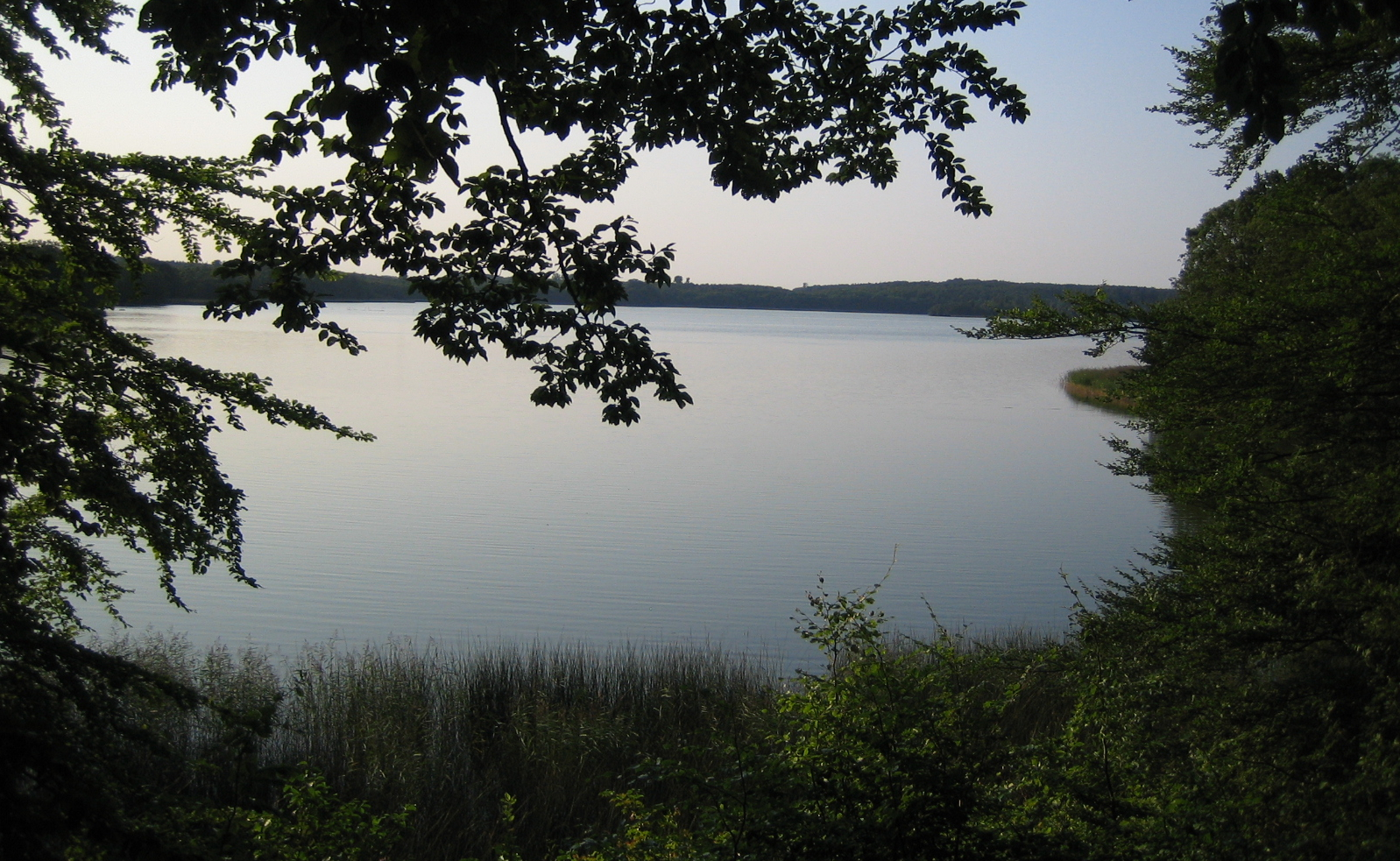
Lake Krageholm was a filming location.

The scenes set in Chisago Lakes were actually filmed at Lake Krageholm in Scania, Sweden. Filming took place from June 1969 to January 1970, and then from May to August 1970.

Ullmann said that for The Emigrants and The New Land, which were shot at the same time, the actors had to learn historic methods of laundry, and also that the brief scene in The Emigrants where she is on a swing took two days to film.

The film employed 20 actors and 500 extras. The combined cost of the two films was kr 7 million, making them the most expensive Swedish film produced until that time.

== Release ==
The Emigrants was released to cinemas in Sweden on 8 March 1971. It opened in New York City on 24 September 1972. The version released in the U.S. was cut from 190 to 150 minutes by Warner Bros., who distributed the film in the United States.

In the U.S., the film was not released on home video until February 2016, when The Criterion Collection released it, along with The New Land, on DVD and Blu-ray. The films had been frequently requested by customers. In 2016, The Emigrants was also featured in the Gothenburg Film Festival.

== Reception ==
=== Critical reception ===
The film received mostly positive reviews. The Emigrants has an approval rating of 94% on review aggregator website Rotten Tomatoes, based on 17 reviews, and an average rating of 9/10. Roger Ebert gave it four stars, praising it as a "masterpiece", "infinitely absorbing and moving", and likely more accurate than traditional stories about immigration to the United States. Richard Schickel wrote in Life that "Jan Troell has made the masterpiece about the dream that shaped America - a dream, and an America, fast disappearing from our views". Vincent Canby of The New York Times hailed the acting performances, especially from von Sydow and Ullmann, which he found to hold "a kind of spontaneous truth, in look and gesture, that does a lot to relieve the otherwise programed nobility, truth and beauty". However, Canby criticized Troell for excessive views of "sunlight-reflected-in-water that becomes just one too many, a thing of movie decoration". In New York, Judith Crist praised the film as "exquisite", and wrote that the depiction of history "throbs with flesh and blood". In 5001 Nights at the Movies, Pauline Kael declared the film is "A bursting, resonant work".

In his 2015 Movie Guide, Leonard Maltin gave the film three stars, calling it "Solid if rambling". Dave Kehr recalled it as overrated, calling it "Uncommitted, tedious, and often dishonest". In 2016, the Swedish journal Sydsvenskan recalled The Emigrants as a classic.

Immigration historian Roger Daniels has called the film "outstanding," as well as "arguably the finest social history in a commercial movie."

=== Accolades ===
The Emigrants was nominated for five Academy Awards, including for both Best Foreign Language Film and Best Picture. However, the academy's rules for eligibility for specific awards meant the nominations occurred in two separate years. It was the third film not in English to be nominated for Best Picture in the history of the academy.

Award	Date of ceremony	Category	Recipient(s)	Result	Ref(s)
Academy Awards	10 April 1972	Best Foreign Language Film	Jan Troell	Nominated	
Academy Awards	27 March 1973	Best Picture	Bengt Forslund	Nominated	
Academy Awards	27 March 1973	Best Director	Jan Troell	Nominated	
Academy Awards	27 March 1973	Best Actress in a Leading Role	Liv Ullmann	Nominated	
Academy Awards	27 March 1973	Best Adapted Screenplay	Jan Troell and Bengt Forslund	Nominated	
Golden Globe Awards	28 January 1973	Best Foreign Language Film	The Emigrants and The New Land	Won	
Golden Globe Awards	28 January 1973	Best Actress in a Motion Picture – Drama	Liv Ullmann	Won	
Guldbagge Awards	none	Best Film	Utvandrarna	Won	
Guldbagge Awards	23 October 1972	Best Actor	Eddie Axberg	Won	
National Board of Review	14 December 1972	Top Foreign Films	The Emigrants	Won	
New York Film Critics Circle	3 January 1973	Best Actress	Liv Ullmann	Won	

== Legacy ==
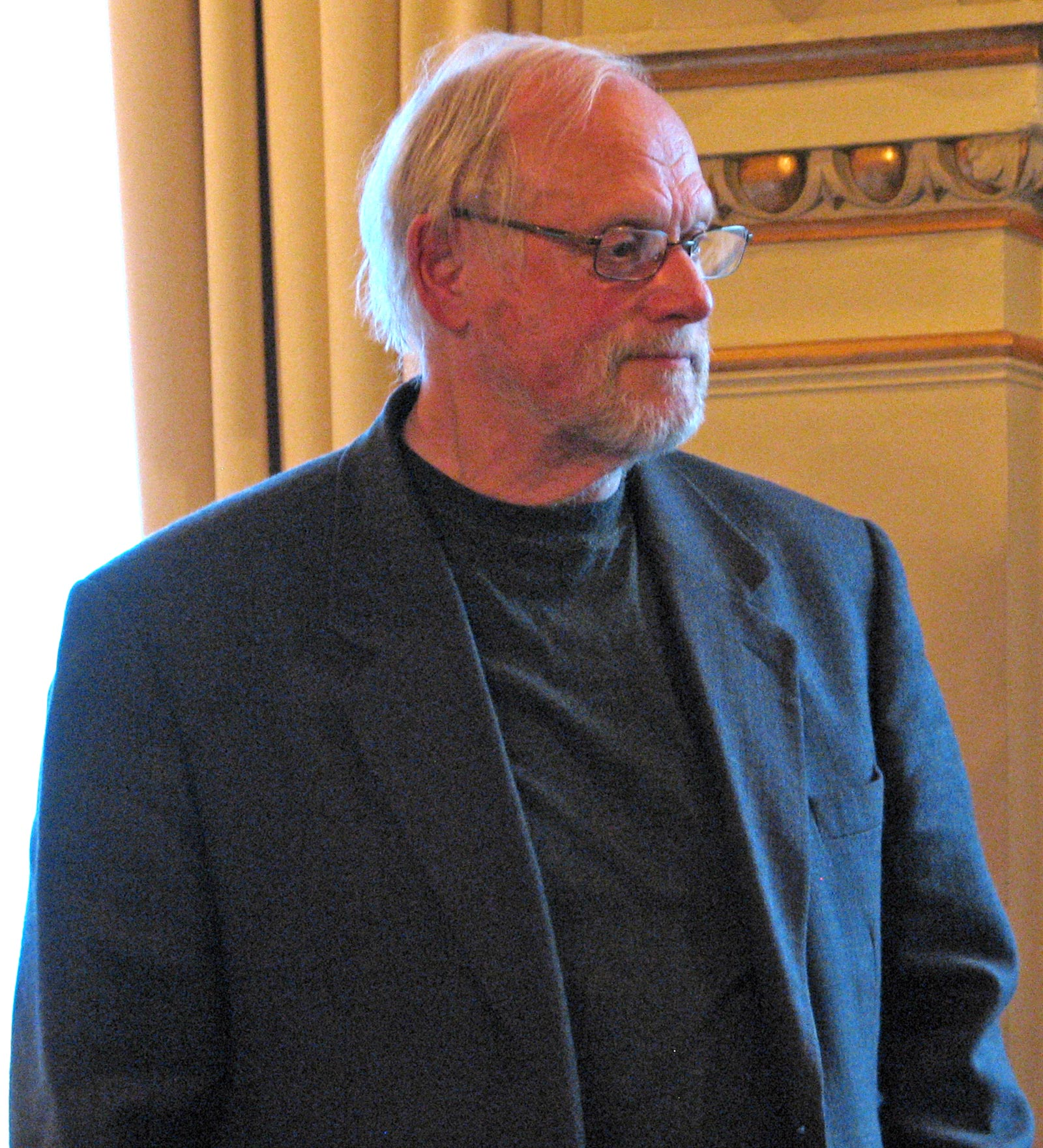
The Emigrants helped make Jan Troell prominent internationally.

The sequel, The New Land (Nybyggarna), was released in 1972. The 1974 U.S. television series The New Land is based loosely on both The Emigrants and its sequel. The creation of the TV series can be attributed to the popularity of the films. In Sweden, the musical Kristina från Duvemåla by Björn Ulvaeus and Benny Andersson, formerly of ABBA fame, was designed partly in reaction to Troell's films, particularly in differences in the set. Troell also gave his approval to Daniel Espinosa to make a new Emigrants film adaptation in 2015, which was ultimately not produced. In 2021, another adaptation based on the book series was released, directed by Erik Poppe.

The two films were considered to give Jan Troell his "international breakthrough". They led to his receiving, and accepting, an offer from Warner Bros. to make Zandy's Bride, one of the first times a prominent Swedish director moved to Hollywood since the 1920s.

== See also ==
- List of submissions to the 44th Academy Awards for Best Foreign Language Film
- List of Swedish submissions for the Academy Award for Best Foreign Language Film
- List of foreign-language films nominated for Academy Awards
