= The New Land (1972 film) =

1972 film

- American theatrical release poster
- Nybyggarna
- Directed by: Jan Troell
- Written by: Jan Troell; Bengt Forslund
- Based on: The Settlers and The Last Letter Home by Vilhelm Moberg
- Produced by: Bengt Forslund
- Starring: Max von Sydow; Liv Ullmann; Eddie Axberg; Allan Edwall; Monica Zetterlund; Pierre Lindstedt
- Cinematography: Jan Troell
- Edited by: Jan Troell
- Music by: Bengst Ernryd; Georg Oddner
- Distributed by: Svensk Filmindustri (Scandinavia); Warner Bros. (International)
- Release date: 26 February 1972 (Sweden)
- Running time: 202 minutes
- Country: Sweden
- Language: Swedish
- Box office: SEK 11.8 million (Sweden)

The New Land (Swedish: Nybyggarna) is a 1972 Swedish film co-written and directed by Jan Troell and starring Max von Sydow, Liv Ullmann, Eddie Axberg, Allan Edwall, Monica Zetterlund, and Pierre Lindstedt. It and its 1971 predecessor, The Emigrants (Utvandrarna), which were produced concurrently, are based on Vilhelm Moberg's The Emigrants, a series of four novels about poor Swedes who emigrate from Småland, Sweden, in the mid-19th century and make their home in Minnesota.

This film is based on the latter two novels of the series: The Settlers (1956) and The Last Letter Home (1959). It explores the struggles of the emigrants to establish a settlement on the frontier and adjust to life in America.

Like The Emigrants, The New Land was nominated for the Academy Award for Best Foreign Language Film. The 1974 American television series The New Land is loosely based on The Emigrants and this film.

== Plot ==
In 1850, Karl Oskar Nilsson, his wife, Kristina, and their three children, along with Karl Oskar's younger brother Robert and Robert's friend Arvid, arrive in what is now known as the Chisago Lakes area in Minnesota after enduring an arduous sea and overland trip from Sweden.

The family initially shelters in a shanty while Karl Oskar builds a permanent house. He begins clearing the land of the pine trees, and, with the help from Robert, Arvid, and their Swedish neighbors, completes a small farmhouse before winter. At the housewarming party, the assembled Swedish settlers, which include Danjel, Kristina's uncle, and Ulrika, who is now Kristina's close friend, discuss whether they regret emigrating. Kristina, homesick, bursts into tears.

Kristina, aided by Ulrika, gives birth to a son, who she names Danjel, after her uncle. Ulrika later marries Pastor Jackson, a friendly Baptist minister who lives in a nearby town. Pious Lutheran neighbors attempt to persuade Kristina and Karl Oskar to shun Ulrika for marrying into another faith, but they refuse.

Robert and Arvid head West to the California Gold Rush. After several years, Robert returns alone to Karl Oskar's farm. He gives his brother and Kristina a stack of banknotes. Feeling that Karl Oskar always looked down on him, Robert says that the money is only a small amount of the gold he found.

Via flashbacks, it is revealed that Robert suffered a series of misfortunes. After working their way west, Robert and Arvid got lost in the desert. Arvid died after drinking poisoned water. Robert was rescued by their Hispanic guide, who took him to a village in the Sierra Nevada. When the guide caught yellow fever, Robert nursed him, despite the risk. Before dying, the guide gave Robert a sack of coins.

After spending time in a small town, Robert exchanged the coins for lighter banknotes and returned to Minnesota. Karl Oskar discovers that Robert was cheated, as the banknotes are worthless. Robert is distraught and, having refused medical help for a persistent cough, dies a short time later.

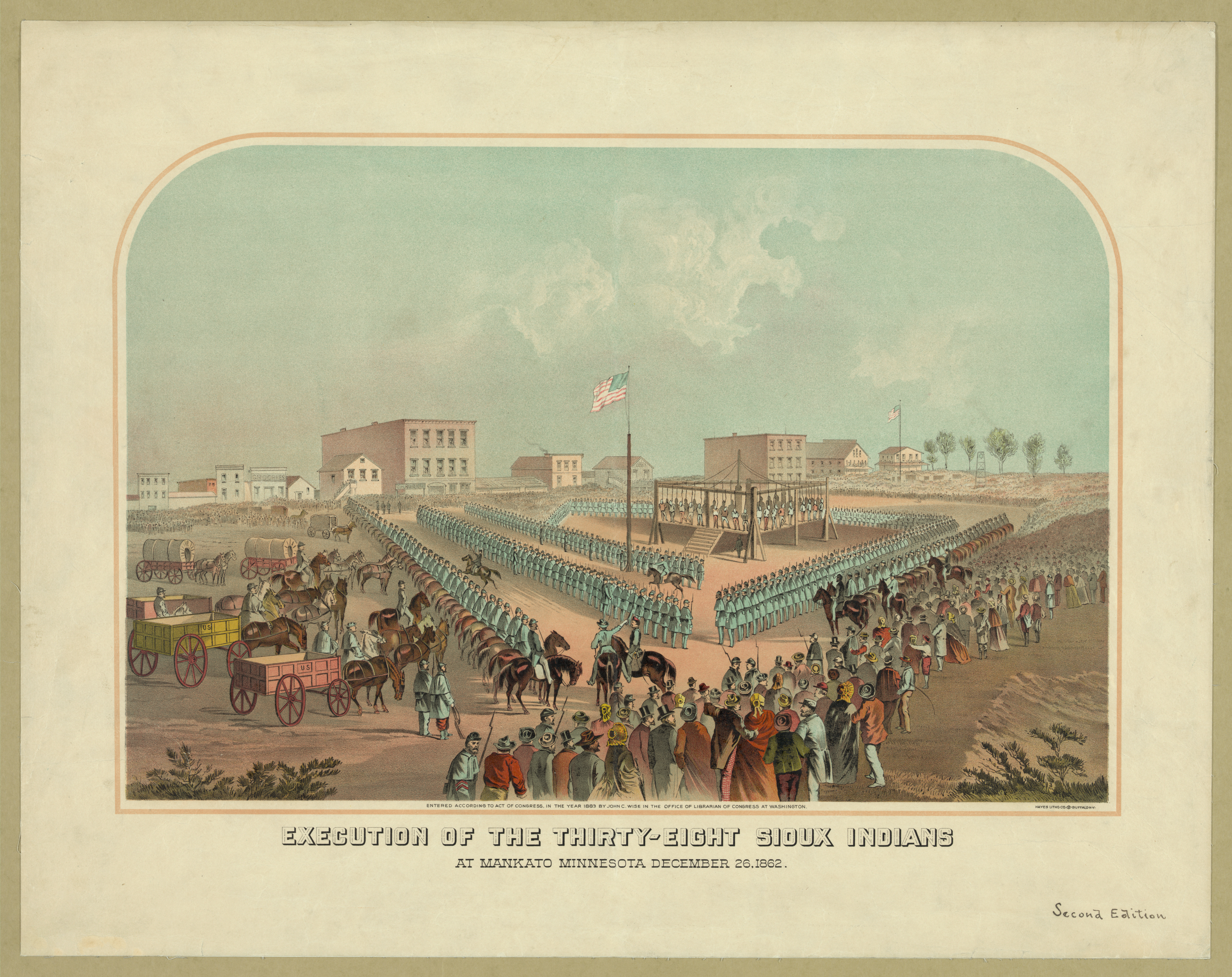
The mass execution of Sioux warriors after the Dakota War of 1862 is portrayed in the film.

In the following years, Karl Oskar becomes an American citizen and tries to volunteer to serve in the Civil War, but he is rejected because of his limp.

Kristina still misses Sweden, and is glad that her husband will not serve as a soldier and kill others. She gives birth to two more children, Ulrika and Frank, after which a doctor advises that, after so many children, another pregnancy could be fatal. Leaving her fate to God, Kristina becomes pregnant again, but suffers several miscarriages. She falls ill when the Dakota War of 1862 breaks out.

Pushed out of their territories, the starving Dakota people rise up and kill hundreds of settlers across Minnesota. Among the dead are Uncle Danjel, his eldest son, and his pregnant daughter-in-law. Karl Oskar is at Kristina's bedside as she dies. The US Army puts down the uprising, and President Abraham Lincoln approves the mass execution of 38 Sioux (Dakota) warriors, a singular event in Mankato.

Overwhelmed by grief, widower Karl Oskar withdraws into solitude as his children grow up and start their own families. He often visits Kristina's grave overlooking the lake. While tending the plot, he can hear hammering sounds of numerous other Swedes, who are moving into the area.

Karl Oskar dies on 7 December 1890. His children have become more American and mostly forgotten their Swedish language. A neighbor, Axel J. Andersson, writes a letter to Karl Oskar's sister Lydia in Sweden to inform her of his death. Included with the letter and visible to viewers is a family photograph showing Karl Oskar surrounded by his many children and grandchildren.

== Cast ==
- Max von Sydow as Karl Oskar Nilsson
- Liv Ullmann as Kristina Nilsson
- Eddie Axberg as Robert Nilsson
- Pierre Lindstedt as Arvid
- Allan Edwall as Danjel Andreasson, Kristina's uncle
- Monica Zetterlund as Ulrika
- Hans Alfredson as Jonas Petter
- Agneta Prytz as Fina-Kajsa
- Halvar Björk as Anders Månsson, Fina-Kajsa's son
- Tom C. Fouts as Pastor Jackson
- Peter Lindgren as Samuel Nöjd
- Per Oscarsson as Pastor Törner
- Oscar Ljung as Petrus Olausson, the Nilssons' first neighbor
- Karin Nordström as Judit Olausson, Petrus' wife
- Eva-Lena Zetterlund as Elin, Ulrika's daughter (uncredited)

== Production ==
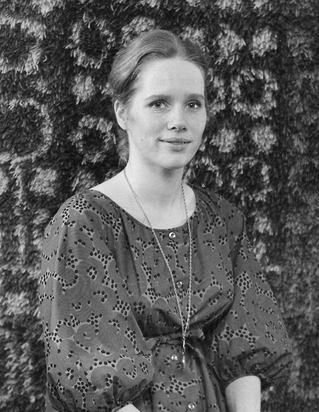
Liv Ullmann won awards for Best Actress from the National Board of Review, National Society of Film Critics and the Hollywood Foreign Press Association's Golden Globes for her portrayal of Kristina.

Actress Liv Ullmann said that The New Land was filmed concurrently with The Emigrants over the course of a year. The cast members spent days in the fields to portray farming, particularly for The New Land. Ullmann said that, after three days of this, she began to feel exhausted.

The film was shot at Filmstaden in Stockholm, as well as in Småland and Skåne in Sweden and Wisconsin, Minnesota, and Colorado in the United States, between February 1969 and January 1970. The combined cost of the two films was SEK 7,000,000 (equivalent to SEK 73,000,000 in 2023), making them the most expensive Swedish films produced at the time.

== Release ==
The New Land was released to cinemas in Sweden on 26 February 1972. The film opened in New York City on 26 October 1973.

The Emigrants and The New Land were edited as The Emigrant Saga and aired on television.

The films were first released for home video viewing in the United States in February 2016, when The Criterion Collection released both films on DVD and Blu-ray. The films had been frequently requested by customers. In 2016, The New Land was featured in the Gothenburg Film Festival.

== Reception ==
=== Critical reception ===
The New Land has an approval rating of 100% on review aggregator website Rotten Tomatoes, based on 9 reviews, and an average rating of 8.9/10.

Writing for The New York Times, Lawrence van Gelder praised the film as "a masterly exercise in film-making", and complimented von Sydow and Ullman. He wrote that, while the film could be "a reunion with old friends" for audiences that had seen The Emigrants, The New Land could also stand alone. Stephen Farber of The New York Times called The New Land "a shattering film", and asserted that "its portrait of the Indians is one of the most interesting ever caught on film". In New York, Judith Crist said the film demonstrated "poetic and human detail". U.S. novelist Philip Roth was also an admirer of the film, writing in 1974 that "It's the first movie I've seen in years and years where I actually believed in the life and death of the characters. But the rendering of the settlement of the Midwest by immigrant Swedes and their dealings with the Indians and nature, is as good as anything in American literature on the subject", and it was an influence on some of his later work.

Roger Ebert referred to The New Land as a masterpiece in his review of Troell's Everlasting Moments (2008). In his 2015 Movie Guide, Leonard Maltin gave the film three and a half stars out of four, praising it for "Superior performances, photography, many stirring scenes". Author Terrence Rafferty wrote that The New Land appears lighter than The Emigrants, but has "a more pervasive sense of danger" and "disquiet", and compared Robert and Arvid to Lennie and George in John Steinbeck's Of Mice and Men. The 1974 American television series The New Land was based loosely on both The Emigrants and The New Land, which Rafferty attributed to the popularity of both films.

=== Box office ===
The film was the highest-grossing film in Sweden in 1972 with a gross of SEK 11,815,000.

=== Accolades ===
The New Land was nominated for the Academy Award for Best Foreign Language Film in the same year Troell was nominated for Best Director for The Emigrants, the first time a director was nominated in those categories for two different films in the same year.

Award	Date of ceremony	Category	Recipient(s)	Result	Ref(s)
Academy Awards	27 March 1973	Best Foreign Language Film	Jan Troell	Nominated	
Bodil Awards	1973	Best European Film	Jan Troell	Won	
Golden Globes	28 January 1973	Best Foreign Language Film	The Emigrants and The New Land	Won	
Guldbagge Awards	23 October 1972	Best Actor	Eddie Axberg	Won	
Guldbagge Awards	23 October 1972	Best Actress	Monica Zetterlund	Won	
National Board of Review	24 December 1973	Best Actress	Liv Ullmann	Won	
National Board of Review	24 December 1973	Top Foreign Films	The New Land	Won	
National Society of Film Critics	4 January 1974	Best Actress	Liv Ullmann	Won	

== See also ==
- List of submissions to the 45th Academy Awards for Best Foreign Language Film
- List of Swedish submissions for the Academy Award for Best Foreign Language Film
