= Jan Troell =

Swedish filmmaker (born 1931)

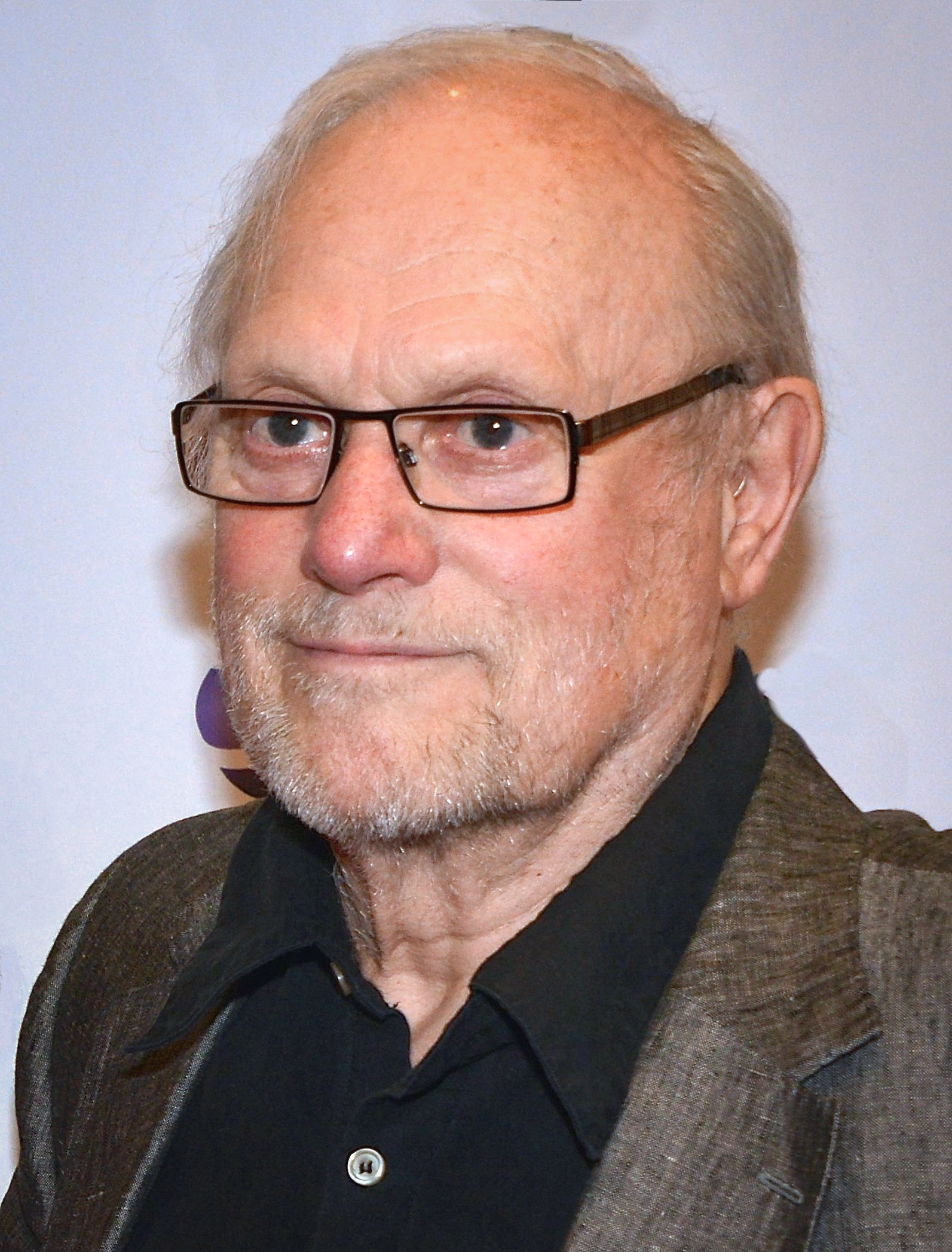
- Troell at the 2013 Stockholm Film Festival
- Born: Jan Gustaf Troell; 23 July 1931 (age 95); Malmö, Sweden
- Occupation: Filmmaker
- Years active: 1966–present
- Spouse: Agneta Ulfsäter

Jan Gustaf Troell (born 23 July 1931) is a Swedish filmmaker, screenwriter, author, and cinematographer. His realistic films, with a lyrical photography in which nature is prominent, have placed him in the first rank of modern Swedish film directors along with Ingmar Bergman and Bo Widerberg.

== Life and career ==
Troell was born in Limhamn outside Malmö, Sweden. For several years, he worked as an elementary-school teacher but started to make short films in the sixties. In 1965 he co-produced the film 4x4 and it was entered into the 4th Moscow International Film Festival. He became director of photography for Bo Widerberg but soon made a debut with his own first feature, Here's Your Life (Här har du ditt liv, 1966), about a working class boy in Sweden, set in the beginning of the 20th century. The film was based upon an autobiographical novel by Eyvind Johnson. For the film he won the Guldbagge Award for Best Director at the 4th Guldbagge Awards. His next film Who Saw Him Die? (Ole dole doff, 1968) won the Golden Bear award at the 18th Berlin International Film Festival.

Troell's major work in the 1970s became The Emigrants (Utvandrarna, 1971) and its sequel The New Land (Nybyggarna, 1972), two epic films about peasants emigrating from the barren Swedish countryside to The United States in the 19th century. Once again, Troell films were based upon the novels of a Swedish working-class author, in this case Vilhelm Moberg's famous Emigrants suite. As in many of Troell's films, Max von Sydow plays one of the major roles. The Emigrants was nominated for several Academy Awards.

After a brief and unsuccessful sojourn in Hollywood, which resulted in the films Zandy's Bride (1974), starring Gene Hackman, and Hurricane (1979), Troell made Flight of the Eagle (Ingenjör Andrées luftfärd, 1982). It is a film about S. A. Andrée's disastrous Arctic balloon expedition of 1897. The Flight of the Eagle was nominated for the Academy Awards (foreign-language film).

The release of Il Capitano: A Swedish Requiem (Il Capitano, 1991) became controversial since the film is based upon a true story; the brutal murder of a Swedish family just a few years earlier (see Juha Valjakkala). Yet, it concentrates on the psychological power game between the murderer and his girlfriend rather than the violence of the crime. He was awarded with the Silver Bear for Best Director at the 42nd Berlin International Film Festival. It also won the award for Best Film at the 27th Guldbagge Awards.

Troell has also made documentaries, for instance Land of Dreams (Sagolandet, 1988), dealing with modern society's alienation from nature and A Frozen Dream (En frusen dröm, 1997) in which he once again brings up Andrée's polar expedition. Troell took part of an extensive poll by Sight & Sound, where he revealed his favorite films to be Snow White and the Seven Dwarfs, Hugo, Modern Times, Hour of the Wolf, The Night of the Hunter and Some Like It Hot.

Despite his age (he is currently in his 90s), Troell has remained productive. His recent films include As White as in Snow (Så vit som en snö, 2001), based on the life of Swedish aviator Elsa Andersson; a documentary called Presence (Närvarande, 2003); Everlasting Moments (Maria Larssons eviga ögonblick, 2008), based on the life of Maria Larsson, a 20th-century, working class photographer; and his latest film, The Last Sentence (Dom över död man)., a biographical film about the Swedish publicist Torgny Segerstedt. The Last Sentence premiered in November 2012 at the Stockholm International Film Festival. At the same festival Troell was awarded the Lifetime Achievement Award.

== Filmography ==
=== Fiction feature films ===
Year	English title	Original title	Source material
1965	4x4		
1966	Here's Your Life	Här har du ditt liv	Här har du ditt liv! by Eyvind Johnson
1968	Who Saw Him Die?	Ole dole doff	Ön sjunker by Clas Engström
1971	The Emigrants	Utvandrarna	The Emigrants and Unto a Good Land by Vilhelm Moberg
1972	The New Land	Nybyggarna	Unto a Good Land, The Settlers and The Last Letter Home by Vilhelm Moberg
1974	Zandy's Bride		The Stranger by Lillian Bos Ross
1977	Bang!		Orgeladjunkten by Sven Christer Swahn
1979	Hurricane		The Hurricane by Charles Nordhoff and James Norman Hall
1982	Flight of the Eagle	Ingenjör Andrées luftfärd	Ingenjör Andrées luftfärd by Per Olof Sundman
1991	Il Capitano: A Swedish Requiem	Il capitano	
1996	Hamsun		Processen mod Hamsun by Thorkild Hansen
2001	As White as in Snow	Så vit som en snö	Den ofullbordade himlen by Jacques Werup
2008	Everlasting Moments	Maria Larssons eviga ögonblick	Att människan levde: en släktkrönika by Agneta Ulfsäter-Troell
2012	The Last Sentence	Dom över död man	

=== Documentary feature films ===
Year	English title	Original title
1988	Land of Dreams	Sagolandet
1997	A Frozen Dream	En frusen dröm
2003	Presence	Närvarande
2007	Tune	Färgklang
2011	Kalla ingenting för sent	

=== Short films ===
Year	Title	Minutes
1960	Stad	25
1961	Sommartåg	14
1961	Nyårsafton på skånska slätten	7
1962	Pojken och draken	30
1962	En broder mer	20
1962	De kom tillbaka	24
1962	Båten	21
1963	Drömmar och syner vid havet	25
1964	Trakom	15
1964	Johan Ekberg	21
1964	Den gamla kvarnen	10
1965	Vår i Dalby hage	4
1965	Uppehåll i myrlandet	30
1965	Porträtt av Åsa	29
1975	Nålsögat	29
1989	Tolvslaget – dagens dikt	7
1994	Dansen	20
1997	... och barnen i äppelträdet	25
2000	92,8 MHz ... drömmar i söder	30
2002	Reflexion 2001	7
2004	The Yellow Tag	10
2010	Med mitt mått mätt – en ökenvandring	6

=== Cinematography only ===
Year	Title	Director
1963	The Baby Carriage	Bo Widerberg
