= Chisago =

Chisago may refer to:

- Chisago City, Minnesota, Minnesota
- Chisago County, Minnesota
- Chisago Lakes, Chisago County, Minnesota
