= Anders Eljas =

Swedish musician, orchestrator and conductor

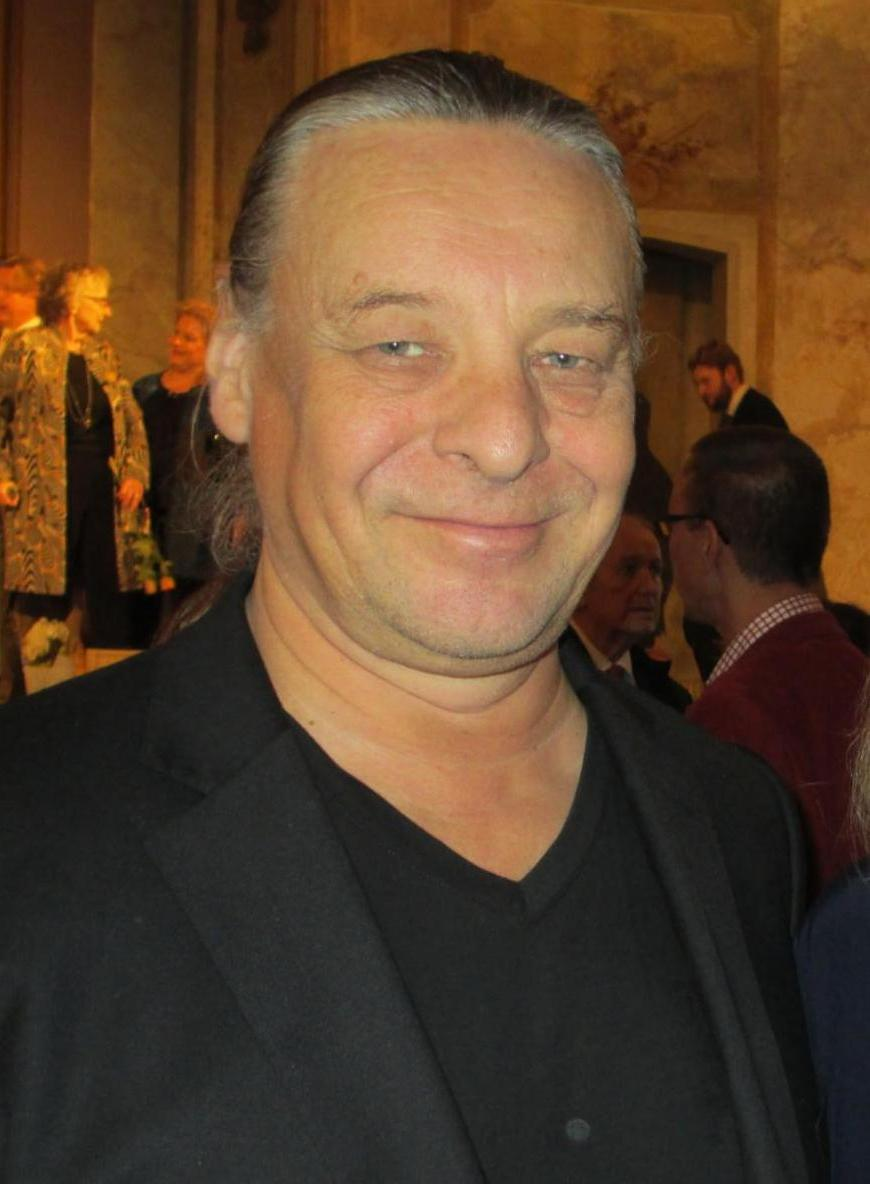
Eljas in 2015.

Anders Erik Gillis Eljas (born 15 January 1953 in Stockholm) is a Swedish musician, orchestrator and conductor.

== Biography ==
He was educated at the Royal College of Music in Stockholm, where he studied piano and violin, began his musical career at Alexandra's and soon toured as keyboardist with Björn Skifs and on ABBA's world tours.

During the 1970s and 1960s, he worked as an orchestrator and arranger for a number of Swedish artists, including Lill-Babs, Lasse Berghagen, Elisabeth Söderström, and Sven-Bertil Taube.

Eljas worked as a producer for CBS Records International (now Sony Music) During the 1980s, he orchestrated the musical Chess, conducting the London Symphony Orchestra for a recording of the musical and a 1984 European tour. In 1988, Eljas was also one of the orchestrators for the Broadway musical Carrie.

Eljas has conducted and acted as musical director for musicals such as Guys and Dolls, Les Misérables, and Mamma Mia!, and was a conductor for many of Povel Ramel's musical revues.

From 1978 to 1995, Eljas was often Sveriges Television's band leader for its shows. He was also a regular celebrity contestant on the popular charades show Gäster med gester on TV.

In 1995 he was responsible for the orchestration of Kristina från Duvemåla.

Since 2000 he has lived with singer Wenche Myhre in Norway.

== Movie music ==
1987: Mio in the Land of Faraway

== Filmography ==
1977: ABBA: The Movie – musician

== Musicals ==
- 1984 – Chess – arrangements & orchestration
- 1995 – Kristina från Duvemåla – orchestration
- 2017 – Chess – new orchestration (first performed in Kristianstad, Sweden, relaunching the musical globally)
