= Land of Dreams (1988 film) =

- Directed by: Jan Troell
- Written by: Jan Troell
- Produced by: Göran Setterberg
- Starring: Rollo May; Ingvar Carlsson; Tage Erlander
- Cinematography: Jan Troell
- Music by: Tom Wolgers
- Distributed by: Swedish Film Institute
- Release date: 8 February 1988
- Running time: 184 minutes
- Country: Sweden
- Languages: Swedish; English

Land of Dreams is a 1988 Swedish essay film by Jan Troell. Its original Swedish title is Sagolandet, which means "The land of tales". Through a series of reportages from contemporary Sweden, Troell uses the film to ponder on the country's transformation since his childhood, into a society he argues has become permeated by rationality at the expense of creativity. Interweaved with the reportages are conversations with the American existential psychologist Rollo May, the politician Ingvar Carlsson soon before he became the prime minister of Sweden, and former prime minister Tage Erlander. Filming took place from 1983 to 1986.

== Release ==
The film premiered in Sweden on 8 February 1988, distributed by the Swedish Film Institute. It was screened in the Forum section of the 38th Berlin International Film Festival. It won the Swedish Film Critics Award for best domestic film of 1988.
