= Raskens =

1927 novel by Vilhelm Moberg

- Author: Vilhelm Moberg
- Language: Swedish
- Published: 1927
- Publisher: Albert Bonnier
- Publication place: Sweden

Raskens is a 1927 novel by Swedish writer Vilhelm Moberg. The story takes place in the 19th century and is about Gustav Karlsson, a peasant who becomes a soldier in the Swedish allotment system. As a soldier he gets a new name, Rask.

It was made into a successful TV mini-series in 1976, starring Sven Wollter and Gurie Nordwall.
