= Bengt Forslund =

Swedish film producer (born 1932)

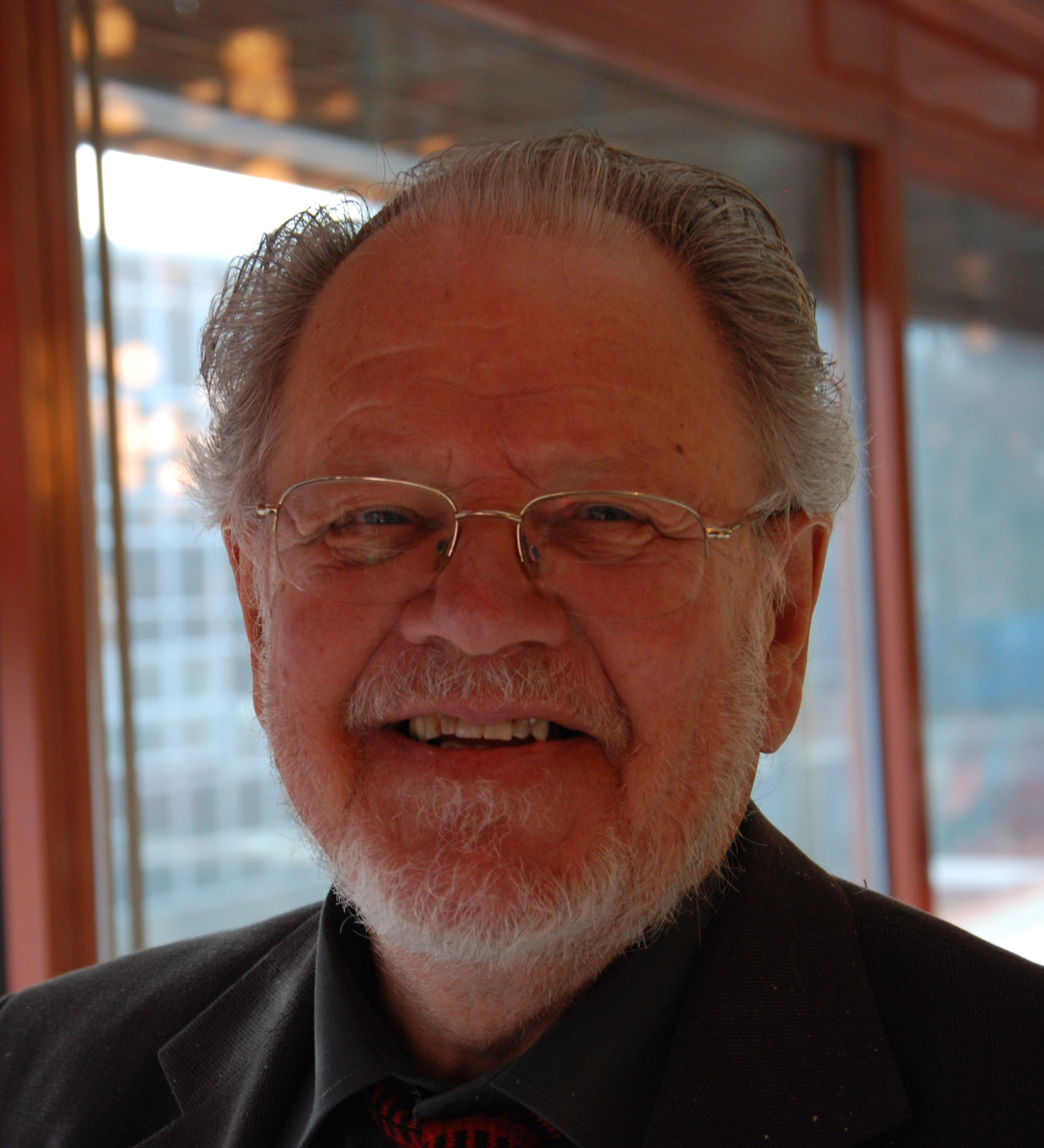
- Bengt Forslund; Photo: Bengt Oberger
- Born: 22 June 1932 (age 94)
- Occupations: Film producer, screenwriter

Bengt Forslund (born 22 June 1932) is a Swedish film producer, screenwriter and production manager. He produced and co-wrote (with Jan Troell) The Emigrants (1971), for which he was nominated for Academy Awards for both Best Picture and Writing Adapted Screenplay. At the 8th Guldbagge Awards he won the Special Achievement award.

== Selected filmography ==
- 4x4 (1965)
- The Corridor (1968)
- Made in Sweden (1969)
- The Emigrants (1971)
- Pistol (1973)
- A Handful of Love (1974)
- Gangsterfilmen (1974)
- The White Wall (1975)
- Hello Baby (1976)
- Games of Love and Loneliness (1977)
