= Ride This Night =

1941 novel by Vilhelm Moberg

- First edition
- Author: Vilhelm Moberg
- Language: Swedish
- Genre: Historical
- Publisher: Bonniers
- Publication date: 1941
- Publication place: Sweden
- Media type: Print

Ride This Night (Swedish: Rid i natt!) is a Swedish historical novel by Vilhelm Moberg which was first published in 1941. The novel is set in the seventeenth century, portraying Sweden as being occupied by the Germans. The novel attempted to foment anti-German sentiment in neutral Sweden by drawing a parallel with Germany's occupation of much of Europe during the Second World War, even though Germany never tried to occupy Sweden.

== Adaptations ==
In 1942 the novel was made into a film entitled Ride Tonight! directed by Gustaf Molander and starring Lars Hanson, Oscar Ljung and Gerd Hagman. Moberg adapted his own novel for the screenplay. In 1985 the novel was turned into a miniseries Ride This Night.

== Bibliography ==
- Winkel, Roel Vande & Welch, David. Cinema and the Swastika: The International Expansion of the Third Reich. Palgrave MacMillan, 2011.
