= Ride Tonight! =

1942 film

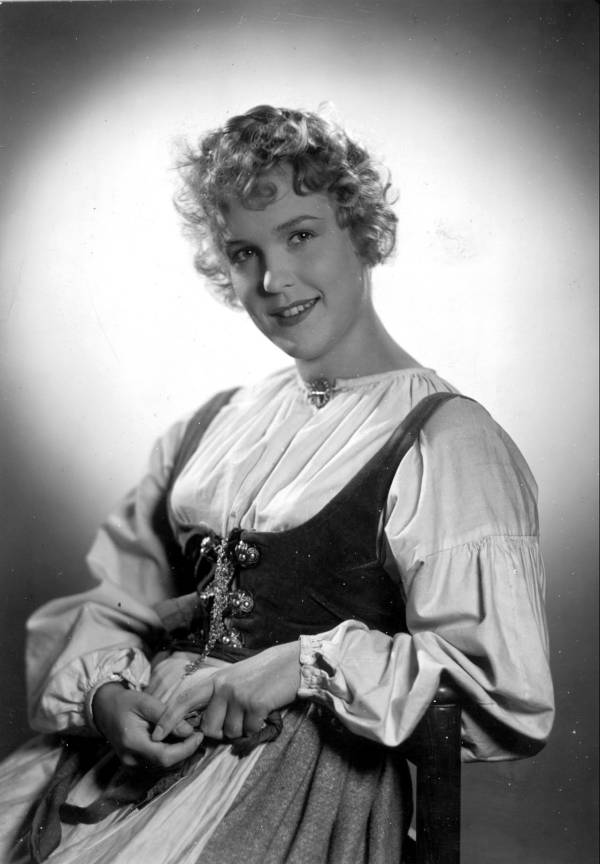
- Eva Dahlbeck during filming
- Directed by: Gustaf Molander
- Written by: Vilhelm Moberg (novel); Gustaf Molander
- Produced by: Harald Molander
- Starring: Lars Hanson; Oscar Ljung; Gerd Hagman; Eva Dahlbeck; Hilda Borgström
- Cinematography: Åke Dahlqvist
- Edited by: Oscar Rosander
- Music by: Jules Sylvain
- Production company: Svensk Filmindustri
- Distributed by: Svensk Filmindustri
- Release date: 23 November 1942
- Running time: 106 minutes
- Country: Sweden
- Language: Swedish

Ride Tonight! (Swedish: Rid i natt) is a 1942 Swedish historical drama film directed by Gustaf Molander and starring Lars Hanson, Oscar Ljung, Gerd Hagman and Eva Dahlbeck. It is an adaptation of the 1941 novel Ride This Night by Vilhelm Moberg. Moberg himself adapted his novel for the screenplay. The film, like the original novel, alluded directly to events in occupied Europe during the Second World War and helped to bolster anti-Nazi sentiment in neutral Sweden.

== Synopsis ==
In 17th century southern Sweden, a peasant uprising takes place against German landowners.

== Partial cast ==
- Lars Hanson as Jon Stånge
- Oscar Ljung as Ragnar Svedje of Svedjegaarden
- Gerd Hagman as Annika
- Eva Dahlbeck as Botilla
- Erik 'Bullen' Berglund as Lars Borre
- Hilda Borgström as Mother Sigga
- Nils Lundell as Ygge, the thief of Bläsemåla
- Erik Hell as Hans of Lenhovda
- Hugo Björne as Petrus Magni
- Sven Bergvall as Archbishop
- Carl Ström as Klas Bock
- Gunnar Sjöberg as Foreign peasant
- Hampe Faustman as Bo Eriksson
- Josua Bengtson as Danjel, inn-keeper
- Axel Högel as Ola of Klavmo
- Gunnar Collin as Matts Elling, peasant
- Signe Lundberg-Settergren as Housewife

== Bibliography ==
- Winkel, Roel Vande & Welch, David. Cinema and the Swastika: The International Expansion of the Third Reich. Palgrave MacMillan, 2011.
