= The Emigrants (novel series) =

Series of four novels by Vilhelm Moberg

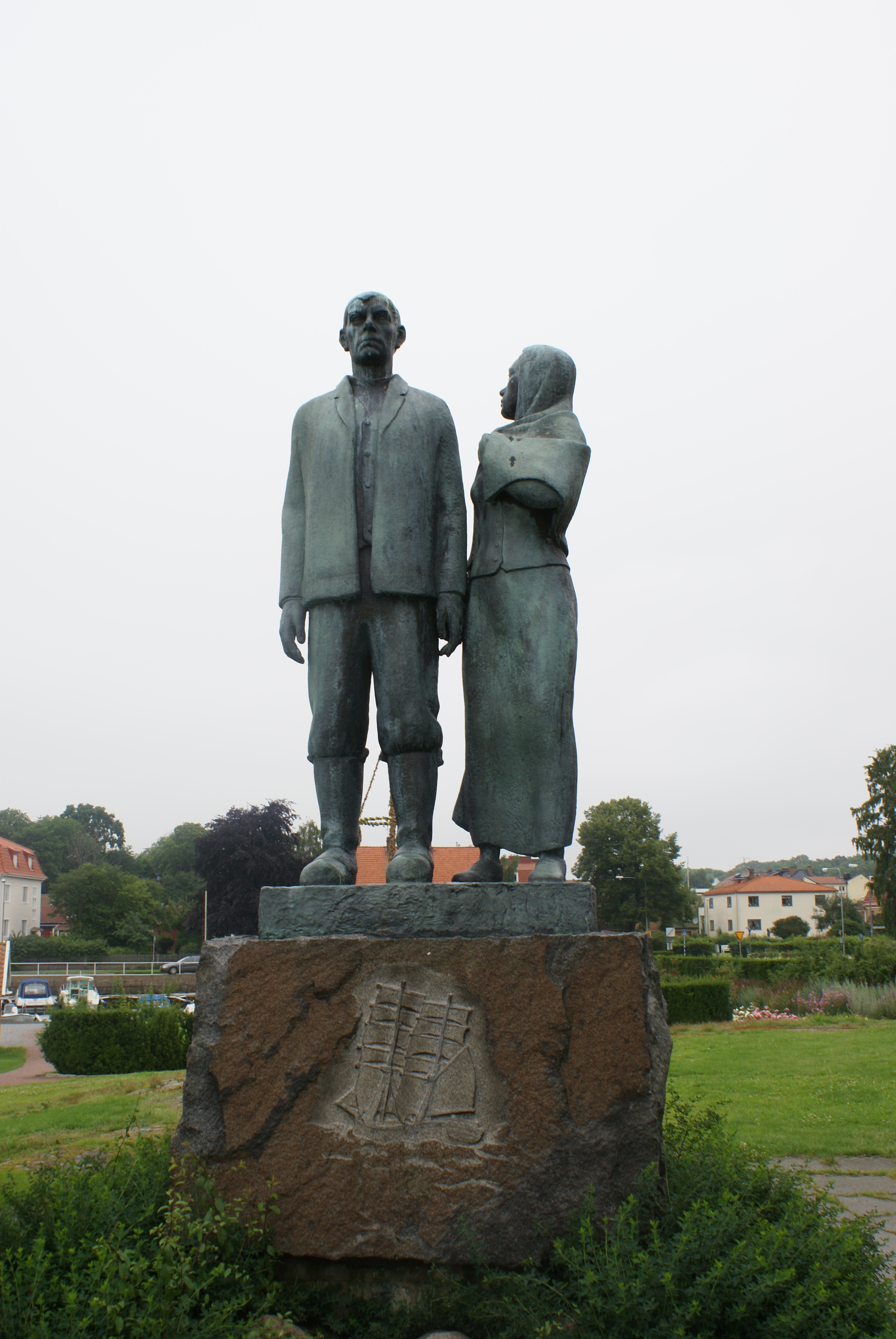
- Statue of the main characters, Karl Oskar and Kristina, in Karlshamn
- Author: Vilhelm Moberg
- Original title: Utvandrarna
- Translator: Gustaf Lannestock
- Language: Swedish
- Genre: Historic drama
- Publisher: Bonniers (Swedish edition)
- Publication date: 1949, 1952, 1956, 1959
- Publication place: Sweden
- English publication date: 1951, 1954, 1961, 1961
- Media type: Print
- Pages: 1780 (in total, Swedish edition)

The Emigrants is a series of four novels by Swedish author Vilhelm Moberg:

- The Emigrants (Swedish: Utvandrarna), 1949
- Unto a Good Land (title in Swedish: Invandrarna 'The Immigrants'), 1952
- The Settlers (Swedish: Nybyggarna), 1956
- The Last Letter Home (title in Swedish: Sista brevet till Sverige 'The Last Letter to Sweden'), 1959

Written in the mid-20th century, they explore the large Swedish emigration to the United States that started about a century earlier. Many of the first immigrants settled in the Midwest, including the Minnesota Territory:

All of the books have been translated into English, in addition to numerous other languages. The novels are generally considered to be among the best works of Swedish literature.

== Plot ==
The first novel describes conditions in Sweden that caused people to become emigrants and make the long and strenuous journey. A party of assorted people living in the province of Småland, Sweden, is explored as they decide to emigrate to the United States in 1850. (Later novels deal with their journey and settling in the Minnesota Territory.) They are among the first significant wave of Swedish emigration to the United States.

The novel focuses primarily on Karl Oskar Nilsson and his wife, Kristina Johansdotter, a young married couple who live with their four small children (Anna, Johan, Lill-Märta, and Harald) and Karl Oskar's parents and his rebellious younger brother Robert. The family lives on a small farm at Korpamoen, where the soil is thin and rocky and so growing crops extremely difficult. Robert works for a neighbouring farm family, which mistreats him. He and with his friend Arvid first come across accounts of going to America. When he talks with Karl Oskar about the idea, his brother says that he too is intrigued by pamphlets that state that farmers' conditions in North America are much better. Also, they will be able to homestead to acquire land. Kristina, however, adamantly opposes emigrating since she does not want to leave her homeland or to risk the lives of her children during the journey.

In the winter of 1849, the family has very little food. To celebrate the christening of their youngest child, Harald, Kristina prepares a large bowl of barley porridge and puts it into the basement to cool. Although she is told to wait, their eldest child, four-year-old Anna, helps herself to so much porridge that she becomes ill. Her parents send for Beata, a healing woman, but she says that Anna's stomach has burst and that she cannot be saved. After Anna dies, Kristina agrees to leave with her husband for America.

As they prepare to emigrate, the young Nilssons are joined by Kristina's uncle and aunt, Danjel and Inga-Lena Andreasson, and their four children. Danjel is the pastor of a local conventicle of the Radical Pietistic Åkianer sect. He has suffered severe persecution by the established state-controlled Church of Sweden. Andreasson seeks religious freedom in the United States. His family is joined by Ulrika of Västergöhl, a former prostitute and member of the conventicle who wants to start a new life with her illegitimate teenage daughter, Elin. Andreasson is paying for the passage of Ulrika and Elin and for Robert's friend Arvid, who worked for him as a farmhand. The last member of the party is Jonas Petter, a friend of Karl Oskar, who is fleeing an unhappy marriage.

The party sets off by wagon for the Swedish port city of Karlshamn, on the Baltic Sea, where they board the brig Charlotta, bound for New York City.

== Recognition ==
By 2013, the four novels in total had sold nearly two million copies in Sweden and been translated into more than 20 languages.

=== Honours ===
- In a 1997 poll by Biblioteket i fokus ("Library in focus"), the series was ranked as the best Swedish book of the 20th century by 27,000 people.
- In a 1998 poll by Sveriges Television, the series was ranked as the most important Swedish book of all time by 17,000 people.

== Adaptations ==
In the late 20th and early 21st centuries, the series was adapted for other forms of representation: three films, and television series, and musical theatre.

Two Swedish movies based on the books, directed by Jan Troell and starring Max Von Sydow and Liv Ullmann as Karl Oskar and Kristina, were released in the 1970s:

- The Emigrants (1971) was based on the first two novels.
- The New Land (1972) was a sequel based on the last two novels.

The American television series The New Land (1974) starred Scott Thomas, Bonnie Bedelia, and Kurt Russell, and was broadcast by ABC. The series was loosely based on the 1971 and 1972 film adaptations. 13 episodes were produced, but only 6 aired.

The Swedish musical Kristina från Duvemåla (1995) was based on the novels. It was created by former ABBA members Björn Ulvaeus and Benny Andersson. It was successful in Sweden and abroad.

Another Swedish film adaptation, titled simply The Emigrants (2021), starred Gustaf Skarsgård, Lisa Carlehed and Tove Lo. Its screenplay was written by Siv Rajendram Eliassen and Anna Bache-Wiig, and the film was directed by Erik Poppe. It was released on digital platforms in August 2023.
