= 8th Guldbagge Awards =

Annual Swedish film awards ceremony

- Date: 23 October 1972
- Site: Filmhusets ateljéer, Stockholm, Sweden

Highlights
- Best Picture: The Apple War

The 8th Guldbagge Awards ceremony, presented by the Swedish Film Institute, honored the best Swedish films of 1971 and 1972, and took place on 23 October 1972. The Apple War directed by Tage Danielsson was presented with the award for Best Film.

== Awards ==
- Best Film: The Apple War by Tage Danielsson
- Best Director: Tage Danielsson for The Apple War
- Best Actor: Eddie Axberg for The Emigrants and The New Land
- Best Actress: Monica Zetterlund for The Apple War and The New Land
- Special Achievement: Bengt Forslund
