= Pierre Lindstedt =

Swedish actor (1943–2026)

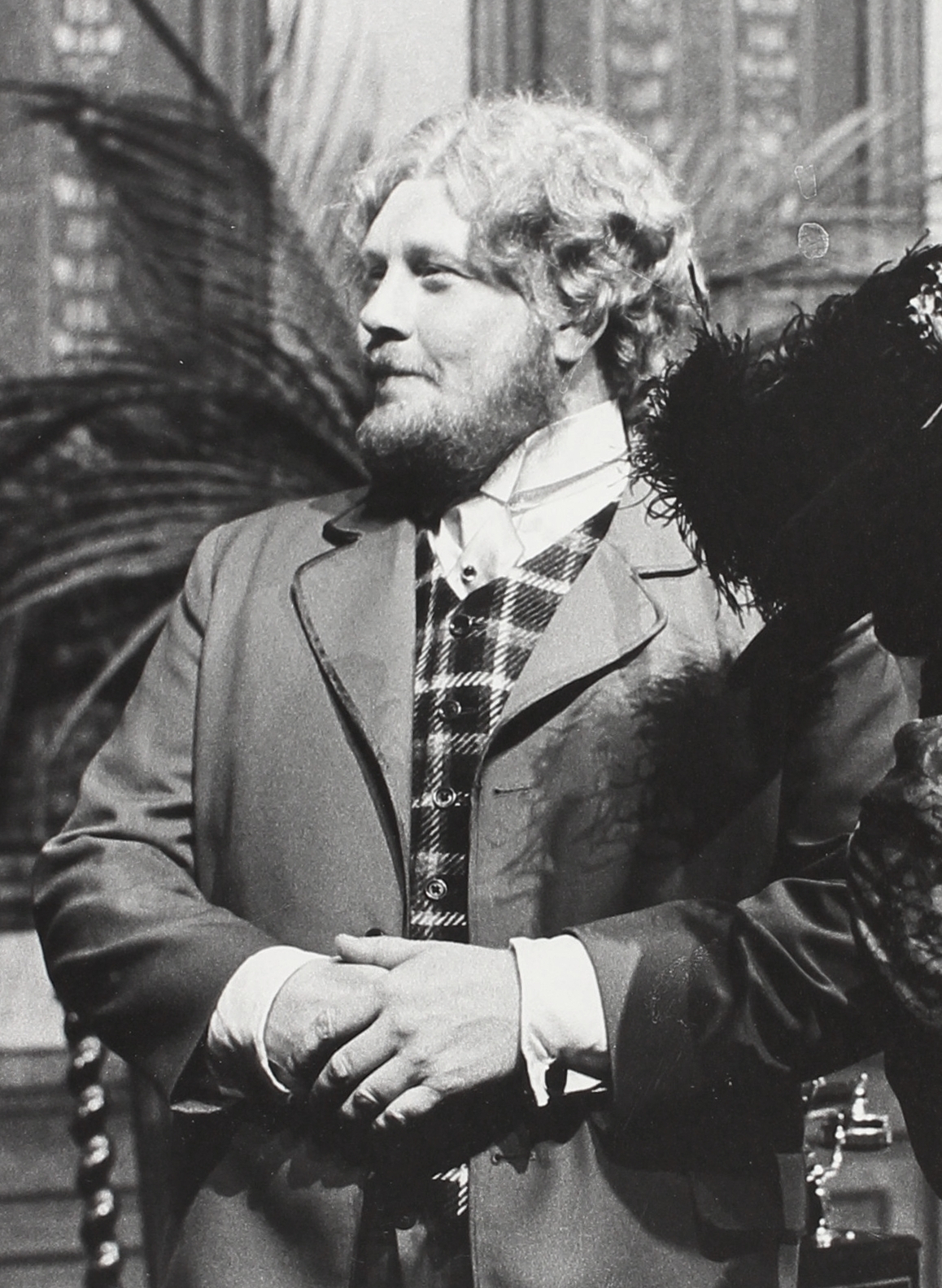
- Pierre Lindstedt during a production of The Spanish Fly at Örebro Theater, 1960s.
- Born: Pierre Ernst Vilhelm Lindstedt; 15 August 1943; Haninge, Sweden
- Died: 10 October 2026 (aged 83)
- Occupation: Actor
- Years active: 1966–20??
- Spouse: Kajsa
- Relatives: Carl-Gustaf Lindstedt (father)

Pierre Ernst Vilhelm Lindstedt (15 August 1943 – 10 October 2026) was a Swedish actor. He appeared in more than 50 films and television shows since 1966. Lindstedt died on 10 October 2026, at the age of 83. He was the son of actor Carl-Gustaf Lindstedt.

== Selected filmography ==
- Ormen (1966)
- The Emigrants (1971)
- The New Land (1972)
- The Man Who Quit Smoking (1972)
- Emil och griseknoen (1973)
- T. Sventon praktiserande privatdetektiv (1989) (Julkalendern, TV)
- Lotta flyttar hemifrån (1993)
- Drömkåken (1993)
- Mysteriet på Greveholm (1996)
- Jag är din krigare (1997)
- Kalle Blomkvist och Rasmus (1997)
- Beck – Advokaten (2006)
- Oskyldigt dömd (2008) (TV)
- Superhjältejul (2009) (TV)
- Mysteriet på Greveholm: Grevens återkomst (2012)
