= Eddie Axberg =

Swedish actor

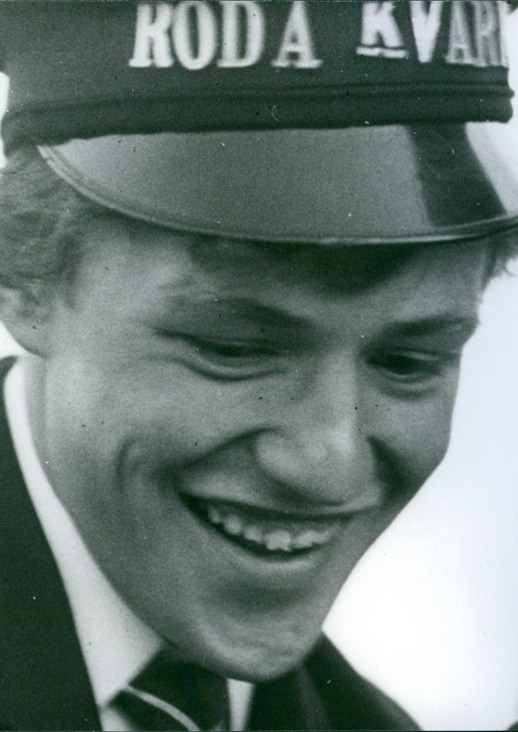
- Axberg in a scene from Here Is Your Life (1966)
- Born: Jan Eddie Axberg; 9 July 1947 (age 78); Stockholm, Sweden
- Occupations: Actor, sound engineer
- Years active: 1959-present

Jan Eddie Axberg (born 9 July 1947) is a Swedish actor and audio engineer. He has appeared in more than 50 films and television shows since 1959. At the 8th Guldbagge Awards he won the award for Best Actor for his roles in The Emigrants and The New Land.

== Selected filmography ==
- Ticket to Paradise (1962)
- Vi på Saltkråkan (1964) (TV)
- Here's Your Life (1966)
- Ormen (1966)
- The Emigrants (1971)
- The New Land (1972)
- A Guy and a Gal (1975)
- Maria (1975)
- City of My Dreams (1976)
- To Be a Millionaire (1980)
- The Queen of Sheba's Pearls (2004)
- Peter-No-Tail (Pelle Svanslös) (1981) (director together with Stig Lasseby; chief animator)
- Peter-No-Tail in Americat (Pelle Svanslös i Amerikatt) (1985) (director together with Stig Lasseby; layout artist)
