= National Board of Review Awards 1973 =

Edition of the film award

45th National Board of Review Awards

December 24, 1973

The 45th National Board of Review Awards were announced on December 24, 1973.

== Top Ten Films ==
1. The Sting
2. Paper Moon
3. Bang the Drum Slowly
4. Serpico
5. O Lucky Man!
6. The Last American Hero
7. The Hireling
8. The Day of the Dolphin
9. The Way We Were
10. The Homecoming

== Top Foreign Films ==
1. Cries and Whispers
2. Day for Night
3. The New Land
4. The Tall Blond Man with One Black Shoe
5. Alfredo, Alfredo
6. Trafic

== Winners ==
- Best Film:
  - The Sting
- Best Foreign Film:
  - Cries and Whispers
- Best Actor:
  - Al Pacino — Serpico
  - Robert Ryan — The Iceman Cometh
- Best Actress:
  - Liv Ullmann — The New Land
- Best Supporting Actor:
  - John Houseman — The Paper Chase
- Best Supporting Actress:
  - Sylvia Sidney — Summer Wishes, Winter Dreams
- Best Director:
  - Ingmar Bergman — Cries and Whispers
