= Oscar Ljung =

Swedish actor (1909–1999)

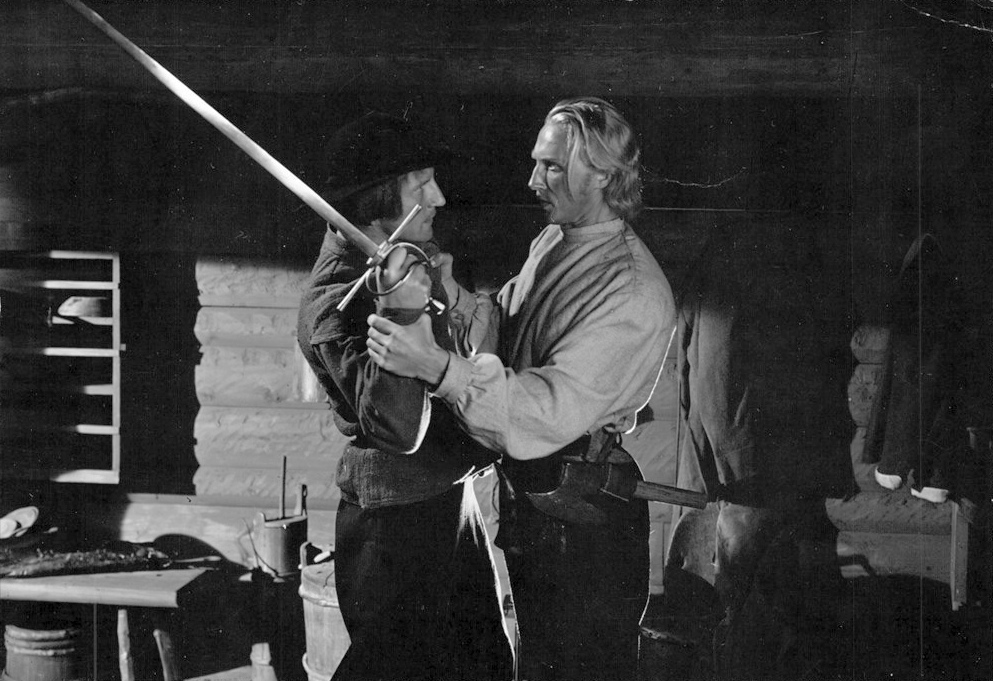
- Oscar Ljung at right in Ride Tonight! (1942)
- Born: 6 September 1909; Landskrona, Sweden
- Died: 29 April 1999 (aged 89)
- Occupation: Actor
- Years active: 1935–1983

Oscar Ljung (6 September 1909 – 29 April 1999) was a Swedish film actor. He appeared in more than 40 films between 1935 and 1983. He was born in Landskrona, Sweden.

== Partial filmography ==
- Järnets män (1935) - Sten Brändström
- The People of Högbogården (1939) - Preacher
- Romans (1940) - Manager at Agrarbolaget (uncredited)
- The Talk of the Town (1941) - Törring, pharmacist
- The Fight Continues (1941) - Allan Hagberg
- Scanian Guerilla (1941) - Per Jensen
- Ride Tonight! (1942) - Ragnar Svedje of Svedjegaarden
- Livet måste levas (1943) - Gustaf Blom
- En fånge har rymt (1943) - Frans Karlsson
- The Old Clock at Ronneberga (1944) - Henrik Heijken
- The Rose of Tistelön (1945) - Kapten Rosenberg
- The Girl from the Marsh Croft (1947) - Per Martinsson
- On These Shoulders (1948) - Andreasson
- Sjösalavår (1949) - Sailor (scenes deleted)
- Realm of Man (1949) - Andreasson
- Skipper in Stormy Weather (1951) - Valter
- Den store gavtyv (1956) - Kalle Karlfeldt
- Synnöve Solbakken (1957) - Guttorm Solbakken
- The Magician (1958) - Antonsson, burly stableman
- The Virgin Spring (1960) - Simon
- Gøngehøvdingen (1961) - Svensk officer
- Vindingevals (1968) - Thelander
- Fanny Hill (1968) - Jan Wilhelmsson
- The New Land (1972) - Petrus Olausson
- Summer Paradise (1977) - Arthur
- Sally and Freedom (1981) - Sally's Father
