= The Settlers (novel) =

1956 novel by Vilhelm Moberg

- First edition
- Author: Vilhelm Moberg
- Original title: 'Nybyggarna'
- Translator: Gustaf Lannestock
- Cover artist: Nisse Zetterberg
- Language: Swedish
- Series: The Emigrants
- Genre: Historical novel
- Publisher: Bonniers (Swedish)
- Publication date: 1956
- Publication place: Sweden
- English publication date: 1961
- Media type: Print
- Pages: 535 pp (Swedish edition)
- ISBN: 0-87351-321-5
- OCLC: 32391776
- Dewey Decimal: 839.73/72 20
- LC Class: PT9875.M5 N913 1995
- Preceded by: Unto a Good Land
- Followed by: The Last Letter Home

The Settlers (Swedish: Nybyggarna, 1956) is a novel by Swedish writer Vilhelm Moberg. It is the third and the longest part of his four novels in the series The Emigrants.

== Plot ==
The book tells about the Swedish immigrants' new life in the United States, where most of the Nilsson party and their friends have started to feel at home.

It also follows the journey of Robert Nilsson and his friend Arvid on the California Trail. They went west to join the Gold Rush.

== Film, television or theatrical adaptions ==
- The New Land, a 1972 sequel to the first film by Jan Troell, The Emigrants (1971), is based on the last two novels, The Settlers and The Last Letter Home.
