= Zandy's Bride =

1974 film by Jan Troell

- Theatrical release poster
- Directed by: Jan Troell
- Screenplay by: Marc Norman
- Based on: The Stranger; 1942 novel by Lillian Bos Ross
- Produced by: Harvey Matofsky
- Starring: Gene Hackman
- Cinematography: Jordan Cronenweth; Frank M. Holgate
- Edited by: Gordon Scott
- Music by: Michael Franks; Fred Karlin
- Distributed by: Warner Bros.
- Release date: May 19, 1974
- Running time: 97 minutes
- Country: United States
- Language: English
- Budget: $3 milliion

Zandy's Bride is a 1974 American Western film directed by Jan Troell and starring Gene Hackman and Liv Ullmann.

The film is also known as For Better, for Worse in the United States (TV title). It was filmed on location near Big Sur, California.

== Plot ==
Zandy Allan is a hard-working cattle rancher in a remote part of the American West who needs a hired hand more than he needs a wife. He sends away for a mail-order bride, a Swedish woman who lives near Minneapolis. Expecting a woman in her 20s, Zandy is disappointed when Hannah Lund turns out to be 32. He is not interested in love, only in work, although this does not keep him from misbehaving around a local woman named Maria. Hannah is here, in his mind, strictly to help Zandy run his ranch and provide future sons. However, the more time he spends with Hannah, the less he comes to treat her as a possession that he has bought, in no small part because of her insistence that she be treated with respect.

== Cast ==
- Gene Hackman as Zandy Allan
- Liv Ullmann as Hannah Lund
- Eileen Heckart as Ma Allan
- Susan Tyrrell as Maria Cordova
- Harry Dean Stanton as Songer
- Joe Santos as Frank Gallo
- Frank Cady as Pa Allan
- Sam Bottoms as Mel Allan
- Robert E. Simpson as Bill Pincus
- Vivian Gordon as Street girl
- Fabian Gregory Cordova as Indian boy
- Rod McGaughy as Gang's Boss

== Production ==
Film rights to the novel were bought by producer Charles Feldman. He died in 1969 and left the rights in his will to Capucine. She unsuccessfully tried to get a workable screenplay the novel. She later sold the film rights to Harvey Matofsky, having met him at the house of Fellini. He had Marc Norman write the script and attracted the interest of Gene Hackman, which led to financing.

Director Jan Troell recounted, "The first problem with me on Zandy's Bride was that I wasn't allowed to operate the camera [because of U.S. union rules]. That makes a lot of difference to me because I feel very awkward sitting beside the camera. Otherwise, I thought it was a very useful experience."

The film was cut after preview screenings.

== Honors ==
The film won Jan Troell the European David award at the 1976 David di Donatello Awards.

== See also ==
- List of American films of 1974
