= Unto a Good Land =

1952 novel by Vilhelm Moberg

- First edition
- Author: Vilhelm Moberg
- Original title: 'Invandrarna'
- Translator: Gustaf Lannestock
- Language: Swedish
- Series: The Emigrants
- Genre: Historical novel
- Publisher: Bonniers (Swedish edition)
- Publication date: 1952
- Publication place: Sweden
- English publication date: 1954
- Media type: Print
- Pages: 490 (Swedish edition)
- ISBN: 0-87351-320-7
- OCLC: 32346945
- Dewey Decimal: 839.73/72 20
- LC Class: PT9875.M5 I613 1995
- Preceded by: The Emigrants
- Followed by: The Settlers

Unto a Good Land (Swedish: Invandrarna, 1952, lit. 'The Immigrants') is a Swedish novel by Vilhelm Moberg. It is the second of his four-novel The Emigrants series.

Unto a Good Land was translated into English in 1954 and was also published in other languages. In 1971 Swedish director Jan Troell adapted both Unto a Good Land, and the preceding novel into a film titled The Emigrants. A sequel, titled The New Land, based on the third and fourth novels in Moberg's series was released in 1972.

== Plot ==
The novel continues the journey of the Swedish Nilsson family in America. The novel begins with the family continuing on from New York City, New York. The Nilssons decide to settled near Taylors Falls, Minnesota, where Fina-Kajsa's son, Anders Månsson, lives. The novel describes their travel by train and then steamboat. On the way to Taylors Falls Danjel's daughter dies of typhoid. When the Nilssons arrive in Minnesota Karl-Oscar, Danjel, and Jonas Petter look for acreage to claim. Karl Oscar settles on the banks of Lake Ki-Chi-Saga (now Lake Chisago), Minnesota Territory. There the Nilssons start building their homestead, living first in a shanty while Karl Oscar attempts to finish their house before the arrival of winter. Since the Nilssons arrived late in the summer they cannot hope to plant anything before the oncoming winter.

Robert, Karl-Oskar's younger brother, takes off for California with his friend Arvid to join the search for gold to join the Gold Rush.
