= The New Land (TV series) =

- Genre: Drama
- Starring: Bonnie Bedelia; Scott Thomas; Kurt Russell
- Opening theme: performed by John Denver
- Country of origin: United States
- Original language: English
- No. of seasons: 1
- No. of episodes: 13 (7 unaired)

Production
- Executive producer: William Blinn
- Running time: 60 minutes
- Production company: Warner Brothers Television

Original release
- Network: ABC
- Release: September 14 – October 19, 1974

Counterclockwise from top left: Scott Thomas as Christian Larsen, Bonnie Bedelia as Anna Larsen, and Kurt Russell as Bo Larsen in a promotional photo for The New Land.

The New Land is a 1974 American dramatic television series about a Swedish immigrant family to the United States trying to establish a life in rural Minnesota in 1858, loosely based on the Academy Award-nominated Swedish film The Emigrants and its sequel, The New Land. It stars Scott Thomas, Bonnie Bedelia, and Kurt Russell. It aired on ABC from September 14 to October 19, 1974.

== Cast ==
- Bonnie Bedelia as Anna Larsen
- Scott Thomas as Christian Larsen
- Todd Lookinland as Tuliff Larsen
- Debbie Lytton as Annaliese Larsen
- Kurt Russell as Bo Larsen
- Donald Moffat as Reverend Lundstrom
- Gwen Arner as Molly Lundstrom
- Lou Frizzell as Murdock
- James Olson as Johansen

== Synopsis ==
Christian and Anna Larsen immigrate from Sweden to the United States with their children, nine-year-old Tuliff and eight-year-old Annaliese, in 1858 and settle in the wilderness outside Solna, Minnesota, where they set about establishing a new life for themselves and their family. Also there is Christian's brother Bo. Reverend Lundstrom and his wife Molly live in the area, and Murdock is the proprietor of the local general store.

== Production ==
William Blinn was the executive producer of The New Land. Philip Leacock produced the show and directed at least one of its episodes. Blinn wrote for the show, as did Gerry Day, Ray Goldrup, Bethel Leslie, Larry Brody, Michael Michaelian, and Katharyn Powers.

Loosely based on two Swedish movies, 1971's The Emigrants and 1972's The New Land, the show was filmed on location in California and central Oregon, near Sunriver.

Popular singer John Denver sang the theme song for The New Land.

== Critical reception ==
The New Land received almost universal acclaim from critics, many of whom compared it favorably with the hit series The Waltons. In the Los Angeles Times, reviewer Cecil Smith wrote that The New Land "seems to catch the rich, grainy earthiness of pioneer life, of clawing a living out of the hard land with the same effectiveness The Waltons mirror the Depression."

== Broadcast history ==
The New Land premiered on ABC on September 14, 1974, but drew low ratings despite its critical acclaim. Its 7.9 rating was substantially lower than that of All in the Family (29.3) and Friends and Lovers (21.3) on CBS and Emergency! (19.7) on NBC in the same time slot. It was cancelled after the broadcast of its sixth episode on October 19, 1974. Seven additional episodes never aired.

The New Land aired Saturdays at 8:00 p.m. EDT/PDT throughout its brief run.

== Episodes ==
No.	Title	Original release date
1	"The Word Is: Persistence"	September 14, 1974
The Larsens cannot afford to replace the livestock they lost in a fire, and Bo must consider the options for the family when he discovers that the land they bought is going to be much harder to cultivate than they first thought. Mike Farrell guest-stars.
2	"The Word Is: Growth"	September 21, 1974
The women of Solna face a frightening problem when the only midwife in the area moves away. Ed Lauter and Ellen Geer guest-star.
3	"The Word Is: Acceptance"	September 28, 1974
A bear attacks Bo and gravely injures him, and Tuliff is haunted by Bo's misfortune and must face the prospect of his death.
4	"The Word Is: Mortal"	October 5, 1974
A cholera epidemic threatens the Solna area. Salome Jens, Don Dubbins, and Lin McCarthy guest-star.
5	"The Word Is: Alternative"	October 12, 1974
Bo falls in love with a young immigrant woman who has come to Solna to marry another man. Belinda J. Montgomery guest-stars.
6	"The Word Is: Celebration"	October 19, 1974
During a three-day journey to a dance in a neighboring town, the Larsens encounter unexpected dangers.
7	"The Word Is: Dignity"	Unaired
The Larsens befriend a slave who is eager to gain his freedom. Lou Gossett, Cliff Osmond, and Pat Hingle guest-star.
8	"The Word Is: Compassion"	Unaired
The presence of a Native American frightens the farmers of the Solna area even though he is peaceable. Ned Romero guest-stars.
9	"The Word Is: Hope"	Unaired
The farmers of Solna need help digging irrigation ditches, but the only laborers available are a group of convicts who are being transferred to a prison in another state. Larry Golden guest-stars.
10	"The Word Is: Caring"	Unaired
A timber wolf is preying on valuable farm animals in the Solna area. Ronald Feinberg guest-stars.
11	"The Word Is: Gullible"	Unaired
Christian and Bo infuriate Anna by buying a beautiful plow horse which they do not need.
12	"The Word Is: Thingamajig"	Unaired
An unscrupulous salesman tricks Anna into buying a sewing machine on credit without telling her about interest or penalty payments. David Huddleston guest-stars.
13	"The Word Is: Giving"	Unaired
The Larsens are burdened with debts, making Anna afraid to tell Christian that she is pregnant. Lee H. Montgomery and Fritz Weaver guest-star.
