= Vilhelm Moberg =

Swedish journalist, author, playwright, historian, and debater

Karl Artur Vilhelm Moberg
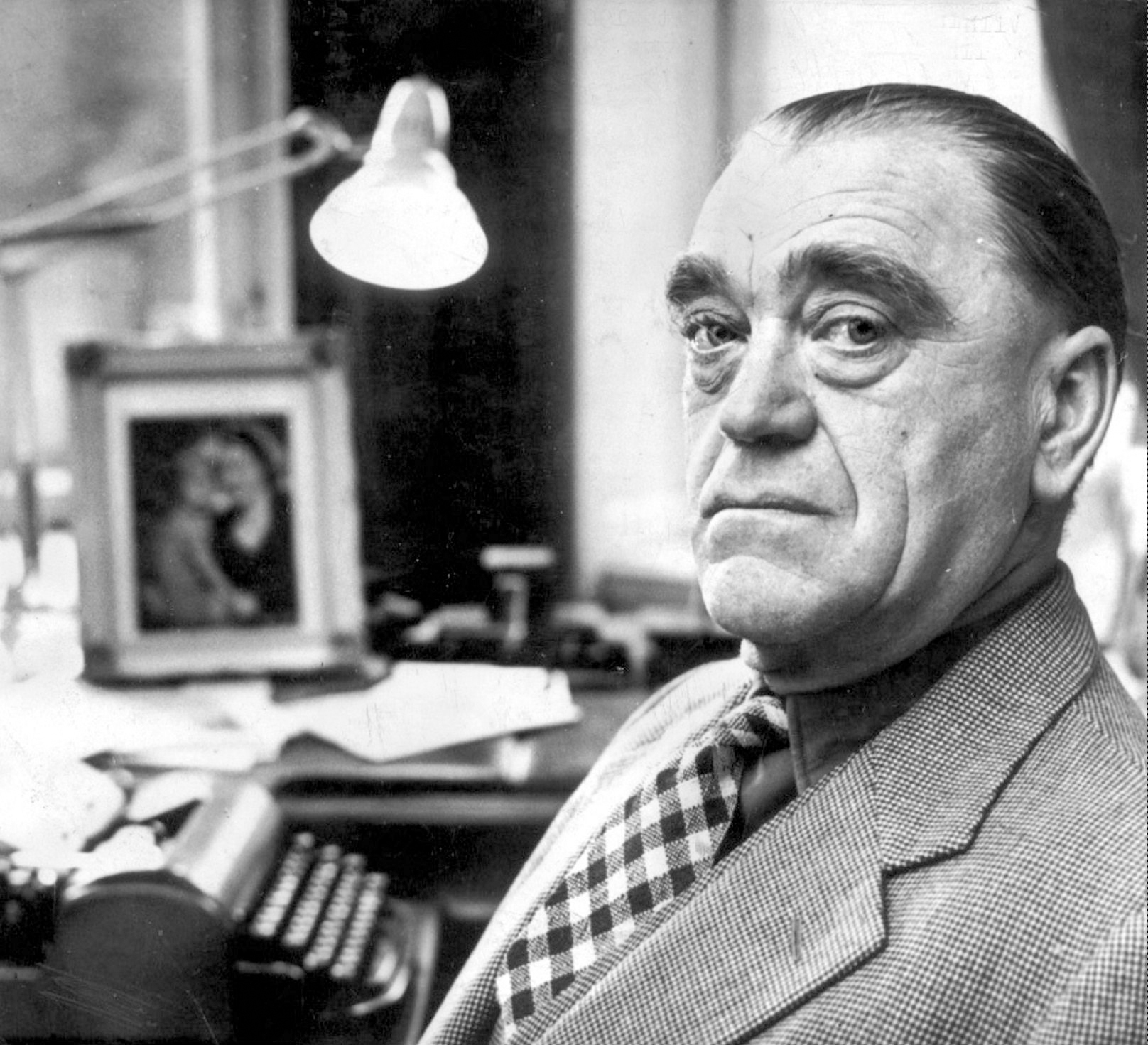
- Vilhelm Moberg, 1967
- Born: Karl Artur Vilhelm Moberg; 20 August 1898; Moshultamåla, Sweden
- Died: 8 August 1973 (aged 74); Väddö, Sweden
- Resting place: Norra begravningsplatsen
- Citizenship: Swedish
- Occupations: Journalist, author, playwright, historian, debater
- Children: Åsa Moberg
- Writing career
- Pen name: Ville i Momåla
- Language: Swedish
- Period: c. 1917–1961
- Notable work: The Emigrants

Karl Artur Vilhelm Moberg (20 August 1898 – 8 August 1973) was a Swedish journalist, author, playwright, historian, and debater. His literary career, spanning more than 45 years, is associated with his four‑volume series The Emigrants. The novels, published between 1949 and 1959, deal with the Swedish emigration to the United States in the 19th century. They have been adapted for a total of three movies (two in the 1970s and one in 2021), and a musical.

Among his other works are Raskens (1927) and Ride This Night (1941), a historical novel of a 17th‑century rebellion in Småland, acknowledged for its subliminal but widely recognised criticism of the Hitler regime.

A prominent public intellectual and debater in Sweden, Moberg was recognized for his vocal criticism of the Swedish monarchy (most notably after the Haijby affair), describing it as a servile government by divine mandate, and publicly supporting its replacement with a Swiss‑style confederal republic. He spoke out aggressively against the policies of Nazi Germany, the Greek military junta, and the Soviet Union, and his works were among those destroyed in Nazi book burnings. In 1971, he scolded Prime Minister Olof Palme for refusing to present the Nobel Prize in Literature to its recipient Alexander Solzhenitsyn – who was refused permission to attend the ceremony in Stockholm – through the Swedish embassy in Moscow.

Moberg's suicide by self‑inflicted drowning drew much attention. He had had a long struggle with depression and writer's block.

== Early life ==
Karl Artur Vilhelm Moberg was born in 1898 on a farm outside the town Emmaboda in the Parish of Algutsboda in Småland, in southern Sweden. He was the fourth child of six, of whom only three survived into adulthood. His forebears were soldiers and small farmers. He lived the first nine years of his life at the tenement soldier's cottage in Moshultamåla that his father Karl Moberg, a territorial soldier, took over in 1888.

In 1907 the family moved to a small farm in the village of Moshultamåla. This had been the family home of his mother Ida Moberg; they had lost it due to poverty. Money from her family in America enabled them to buy the property back. Moberg had only limited schooling from 1906 until 1912. However, as a child he was an avid reader; he published his first writing at the age of 13.

Moberg worked as a farmer and forest laborer, and later at glassblowing before and between his various studies. In 1916 he nearly emigrated to the United States, following his uncle and aunt, but ultimately decided to remain in Sweden with his parents. Largely self‑educated, Moberg studied at Kronoberg County Folk High School in Grimslöv from 1916 to 1917, and at Katrineholms Praktiska Skola, a private school in Katrineholm, from 1917 to 1918. Moberg contracted the Spanish flu in 1918, and was sick for half a year. After his illness, Moberg took a position on the newspaper Vadstena Läns Tidning in Vadstena, Östergötland, which published many of his stories between 1919 and 1929.

In 1926, Moberg made his breakthrough as a playwright when his comedy Kassabrist had a successful run in Stockholm. He published his first novel Raskens the following year. Moberg became a full‑time writer when the financial success of Raskens enabled him to devote himself entirely to writing.

== Author ==
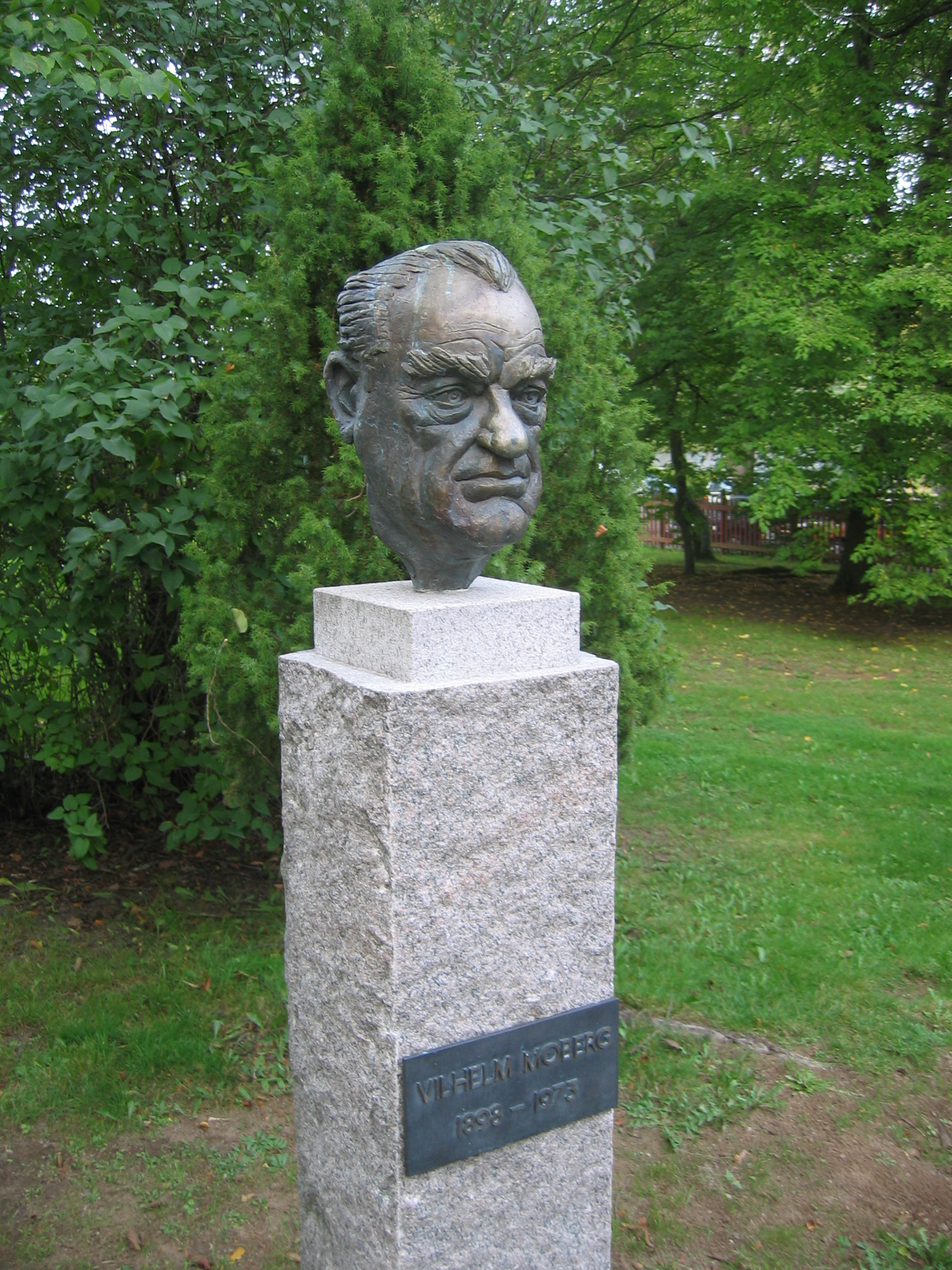
Bust near the Swedish Emigrant Institute, Växjö

Many of his works have been translated into English, and he is well‑recognized in the English‑speaking world among those interested in Scandinavian culture and history. In his autobiographical novel, A Soldier with a Broken Rifle (Swedish: Soldat med brutet gevär), he speaks to the importance of giving voice to the downtrodden, illiterate classes of his forebears. This viewpoint also formed his History of the Swedish People, I–II (Swedish: Min svenska historia, berättad för folket, I–II), published in 1970–71 in both Swedish and English. He had intended the history to have more volumes, but he never finished it.

As a playwright, Moberg wrote 38 works for the stage or for radio (1919–1973). Some were produced as lighter classics of the Swedish stage and television, or were adapted as feature films by directors such as Ingmar Bergman (Lea och Rakel/Leah and Rachel; Malmö City Theatre 1955) and Alf Sjöberg (Domaren/The Judge; 1960).

== Social themes ==
Moberg had become a member of a young Social Democrats club in 1913. In his works, he often expressed a republican (anti‑royalist) point of view. He was strongly influenced by the facts that surfaced in the Kejne affair and Haijby affair, in which Moberg took an active part.

From the 1950s, Moberg participated in debates about the Swedish monarchy, bureaucracy, and corruption. In addition, he devoted much time to help individual citizens who had suffered injustice. Much like others of his generation of Swedish authors from a working‑class background, such as Ivar Lo‐Johansson, Harry Martinson and Moa Martinson, Moberg depicted the life of the dispossessed, their traditions, customs, and everyday struggle. His novels are important documents of social history, and trace the influences of various social and political movements in Sweden.

== The Emigrants series ==
From 1948 to 1960, Moberg lived in Carmel-by-the-Sea, California. While there, he wrote his most famous work, The Emigrants, a series of four novels, written between 1949 and 1959. The series describes one Swedish family's emigration from Småland to Chisago County, Minnesota in the mid‑19th century. This was a destiny shared by almost one million Swedish people, including several of the author's relatives. These novels have been translated into English: The Emigrants (1951), Unto a Good Land (1954), The Settlers (1961), and The Last Letter Home (1961). His literary portrayal of the Swedish‑American immigrant experience is considered comparable to Ole Edvart Rølvaag's work depicting that of Norwegian‑American immigrants.

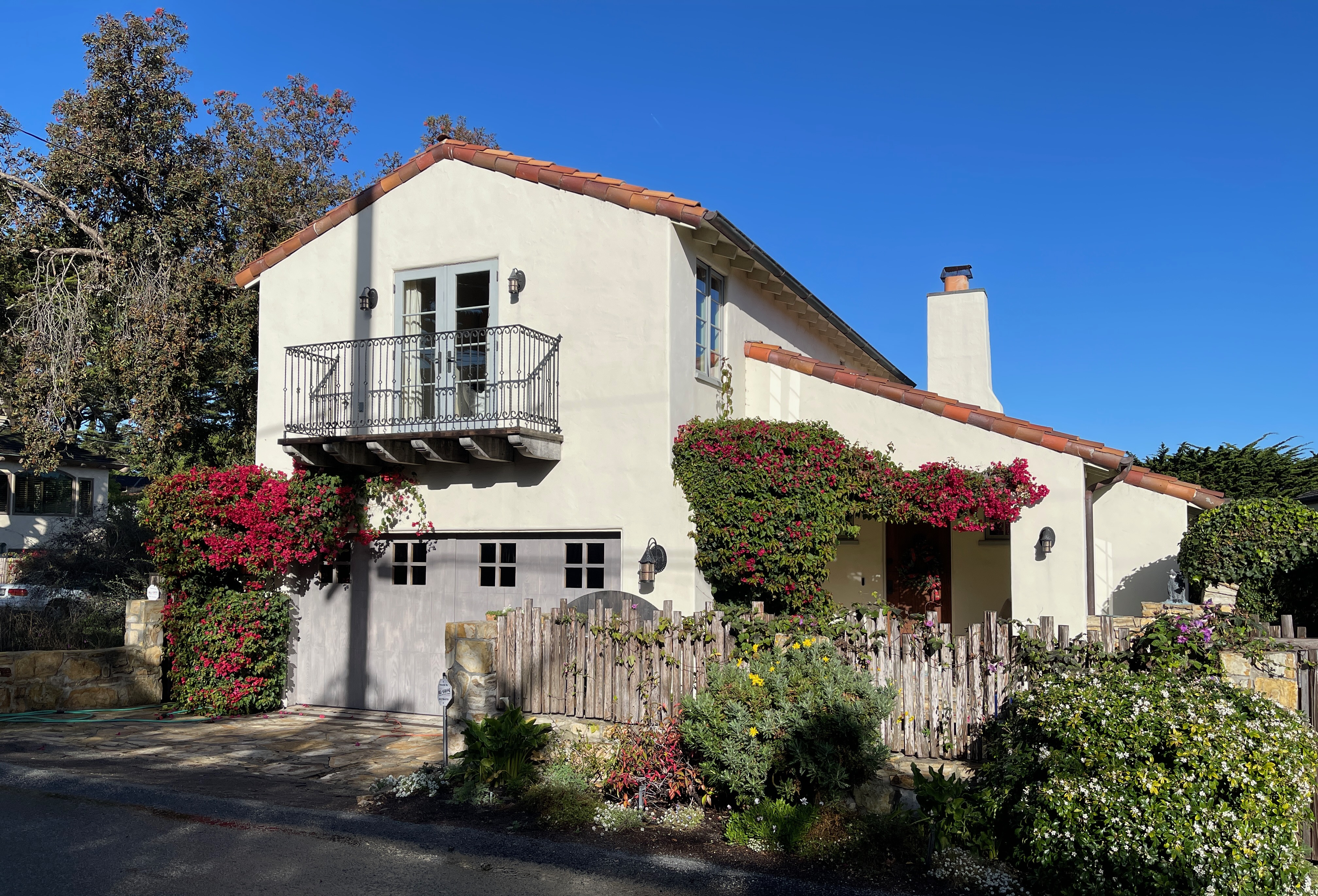
The Vilhelm Moberg House in Carmel Point.

The Vilhelm Moberg House is located on Carmel Point at 2423 San Antonio Avenue, near Isabella & Martin Way. Moberg also lived for a time in the guesthouse of Gustaf Lannestock, his friend and translator, at 26085 Scenic Road.

=== Films and musical ===
Swedish film director Jan Troell in 1971–72 adapted the books into two major feature films, The Emigrants (based on the first two novels) and The New Land (based on the second two), both starring Max von Sydow and Liv Ullmann as Karl Oskar and Kristina. These were nominated for several Academy Awards, and The New Land won Golden Globe Awards.

The musical Kristina från Duvemåla (English title Kristina) (1995) by ex‑ABBA members Björn Ulvaeus and Benny Andersson is based on Moberg's The Emigrants Series.

A later film adaptation, known simply as The Emigrants was released in 2021, and in August 2022 on digital platforms.

Several other works by Moberg have been turned into films and TV series in Sweden over the years.

== Moberg Room ==
Moberg donated his papers to the Swedish Emigrant Institute in Växjö, Sweden, It displays his original manuscripts, excerpts, notes, and photographs in The Moberg Room, in such a way that visitors get a feeling of meeting Vilhelm Moberg in his workshop. This unique collection of Moberg memorabilia includes Axel Olsson's sculpture entitled The Emigrants, which portrays the main characters featured in The Emigrants Series. The Vilhelm Moberg Society, headquartered in the Swedish Emigrant Institute, promotes publications, research and popular interest in Moberg's works.

== Later life ==
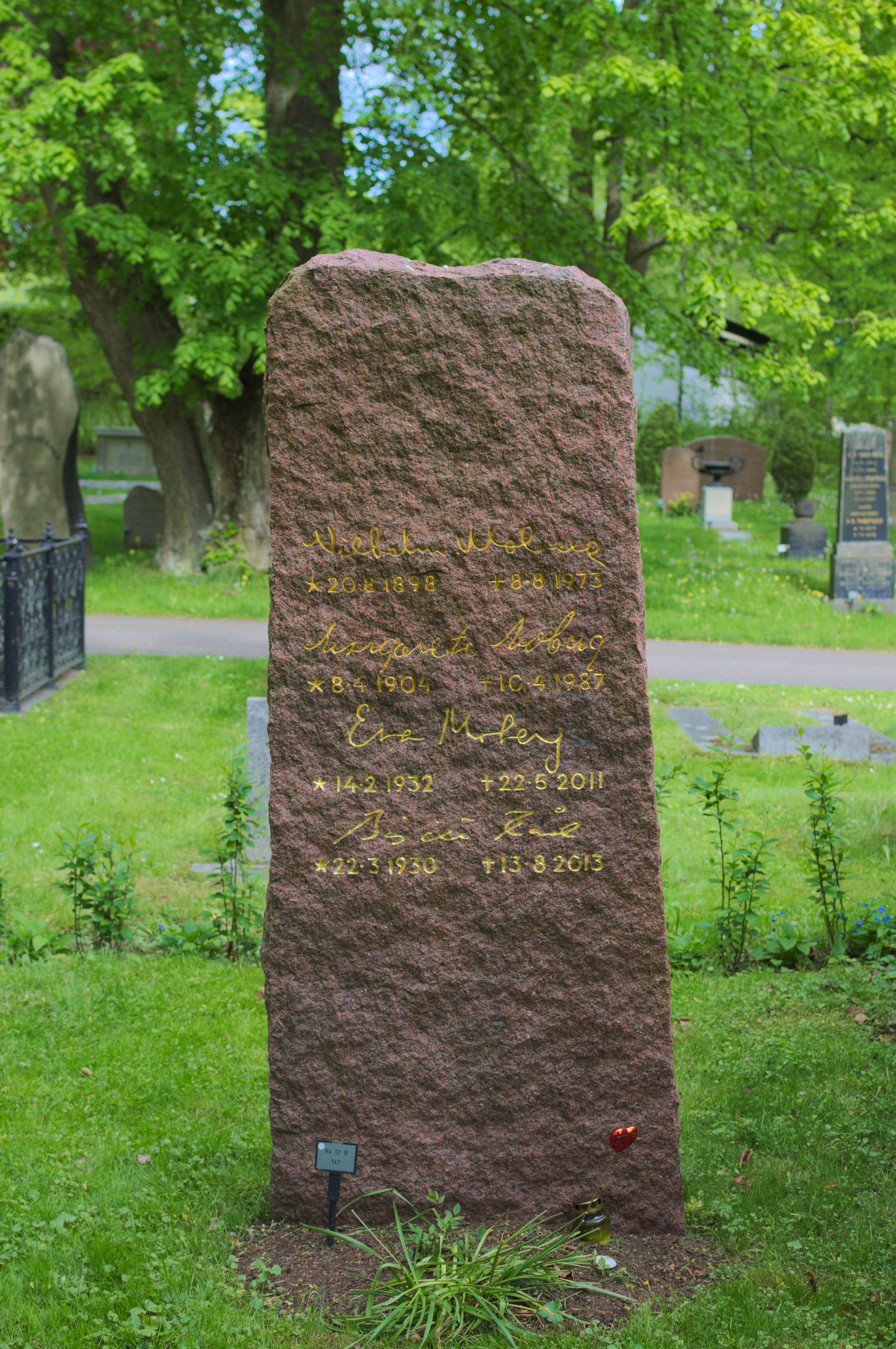
Grave at Norra begravningsplatsen in Stockholm.

Moberg struggled with severe depression in the last years of his life. He committed suicide by drowning himself in the sea outside his house. He left a note to his wife saying: "The time is twenty past seven; I go to seek in the sea the eternal sleep. Forgive me, I could not endure." Moberg was buried in Norra begravningsplatsen in Stockholm.

Klockan är tjugo över sju. Jag går att söka i sjön, sömnen utan slut. Förlåt mig, jag orkade inte uthärda.

== Works in English translation ==
=== The Emigrants novel series ===
- The Emigrants (1949), ISBN 0-87351-319-3.
- Unto a Good Land (1952), ISBN 0-87351-320-7.
- The Settlers (1956), ISBN 0-87351-321-5.
- The Last Letter Home (1959), ISBN 0-87351-322-3.

=== Other fiction ===
- Memory of Youth
- Ride This Night
- A Time on Earth, ISBN 1-56849-314-2.
- When I Was a Child, ISBN 0-8488-0302-7.

=== Nonfiction ===
- A History of the Swedish People, Vol. 1: From Prehistory to the Renaissance, ISBN 0-8166-4656-2.
- A History of the Swedish People, Vol. 2: From Renaissance to Revolution, ISBN 0-8166-4657-0. Both volumes translated by Paul Britten Austin.
- The Unknown Swedes: A Book About Swedes and America, Past and Present, ISBN 0-8093-1486-X.

== Sources ==
- Holmes, Philip. Vilhelm Moberg, Twayne's world authors series (Boston, MA: Twayne Publishers. 1980)
- Holmes, Philip. Vilhelm Moberg. En introduktion till hans författarskap (Stockholm, Carlsson, 2001)
- Holmes, Philip. Vilhelm Moberg: Utvandrarna (Studies in Swedish literature (Orton and Holmes. 1976)
- Eidevall, Gunnar. Vilhelm Moberg, Swedish portraits (Stockholm, Sweden: Svenska Institutet; 2nd edition. 1996)
- Mårtensson, Sigvard. Vilhelm Moberg och teatern (Stockholm, Carlssons, 1992)
