= The Last Letter Home =

1959 novel by Vilhelm Moberg

- First english edition
- Author: Vilhelm Moberg
- Original title: 'Sista brevet till Sverige'
- Translator: Gustaf Lannestock
- Language: Swedish
- Series: The Emigrants
- Genre: Historical novel
- Publisher: Bonniers (Swedish edition)
- Publication date: 1959
- Publication place: Sweden
- English publication date: 1961
- Media type: Print
- Pages: 311 pp (Swedish edition)
- ISBN: 0-87351-322-3
- OCLC: 32346926
- Dewey Decimal: 839.73/72 20
- LC Class: PT9875.M5 S513 1995
- Preceded by: The Settlers
- Followed by: None

The Last Letter Home (Swedish: Sista brevet till Sverige) is a 1959 historical novel by Swedish writer Vilhelm Moberg. It is the fourth and final novel of his The Emigrants series. It is the shortest book of the four and has a faster pace.

== Plot ==
This novel tells about Karl-Oskar and Kristina Nilson in their later lives and their deaths. The novel has a slightly more reflective perspective than the other three. It is set against such events as the American Civil War and the Sioux Outbreak of 1862 through the perspective of the settlers.

== Film, television or theatrical adaptions ==
- The New Land (1972), Jan Troell's film sequel to The Emigrants, is based on the last two novels of Moberg's series: The Settlers and this one.
