= The Emigrants (Moberg novel) =

1949 novel by Vilhelm Moberg

- First edition
- Author: Vilhelm Moberg
- Original title: Utvandrarna
- Translator: Gustaf Lannestock
- Language: Swedish
- Series: The Emigrants (Swedish: Utvandrarepos)
- Genre: Historical novel
- Publisher: Bonniers (Swedish edition)
- Publication date: 1949
- Publication place: Sweden
- English publication date: 1951
- Media type: Print
- Pages: 444 (Swedish edition)
- ISBN: 0-87351-319-3
- OCLC: 32346955
- Dewey Decimal: 839.73/72 20
- LC Class: PT9875.M5 U713 1995
- Preceded by: None
- Followed by: Unto a Good Land

The Emigrants (Swedish: Utvandrarna, 1949) is a novel by Swedish writer Vilhelm Moberg. It is the first of his four-novel series entitled The Emigrants. In these he explores the causes and process of the major Swedish emigration to the United States beginning in the mid-nineteenth century, and the hardships they endure in their journey and settling in such frontier areas as the Minnesota Territory.

In 1951, Simon & Schuster published an English-language edition translated by Gustaf Lannestock.

== Plot ==
The story takes place in the 1840s up to 1850. The first part of the novel describes the hardships faced by rural families in Sweden, who generally struggled in poverty. Karl Oskar Nilsson and his wife, Kristina, own a farm in Ljuder socken in Småland. They have four children and work hard to make a living, but the poor soil and poor harvests lead to famine. This is a catalyst for emigration to the United States in search of a better life. Karl Oskar and his brother Robert want to go, but Kristina doesn't want to leave her home country. She knows that she will never see the rest of their family again, and fears risk to their children. But after their daughter dies, she agrees to go, realizing their children are at risk in Sweden, too.

They pack up their belongings and book ship passage in a group with others from their parish. The characters illustrate some of the motives that prompted people to leave Sweden in the 19th century. The travelers include:

- Karl Oskar, Kristina and their children – seeking to escape poverty and famine, and to find a place with better land so their work pays off.
- Robert, Karl Oskar's younger brother – landless, the second son of a farmer whose holdings are too small to sub-divide. He seeks escape from being a hired farmhand.
- Danjel Andreasson with family, Kristina's maternal uncle, has been banished from the country as a member of a religious sect. The state Lutheran church did not abide dissent. They bring their farmhand Arvid, a friend of Robert Nilsson.
- Jonas Petter Albrektsson, seeks to escape an unhappy marriage, as divorce was not possible.
- Ulrika of Västergöhl, a former prostitute, wanting a new life with her illegitimate daughter Elin.

The second part of the book tells of their sea journey across the Atlantic Ocean. They board the ship in Karlshamn, and have an arduous, ten-week voyage, during which they deal with sea-sickness and scurvy, before reaching New York City in midsummer of 1850. The novel ends with the travelers marveling at the technological wonders of their new country. The Hudson River Railroad (which would grow into the New York Central) is almost complete, and opened October 3, 1851.
