= Timeline of LGBTQ history in Sweden =

Notable events in Swedish LGBTQ history

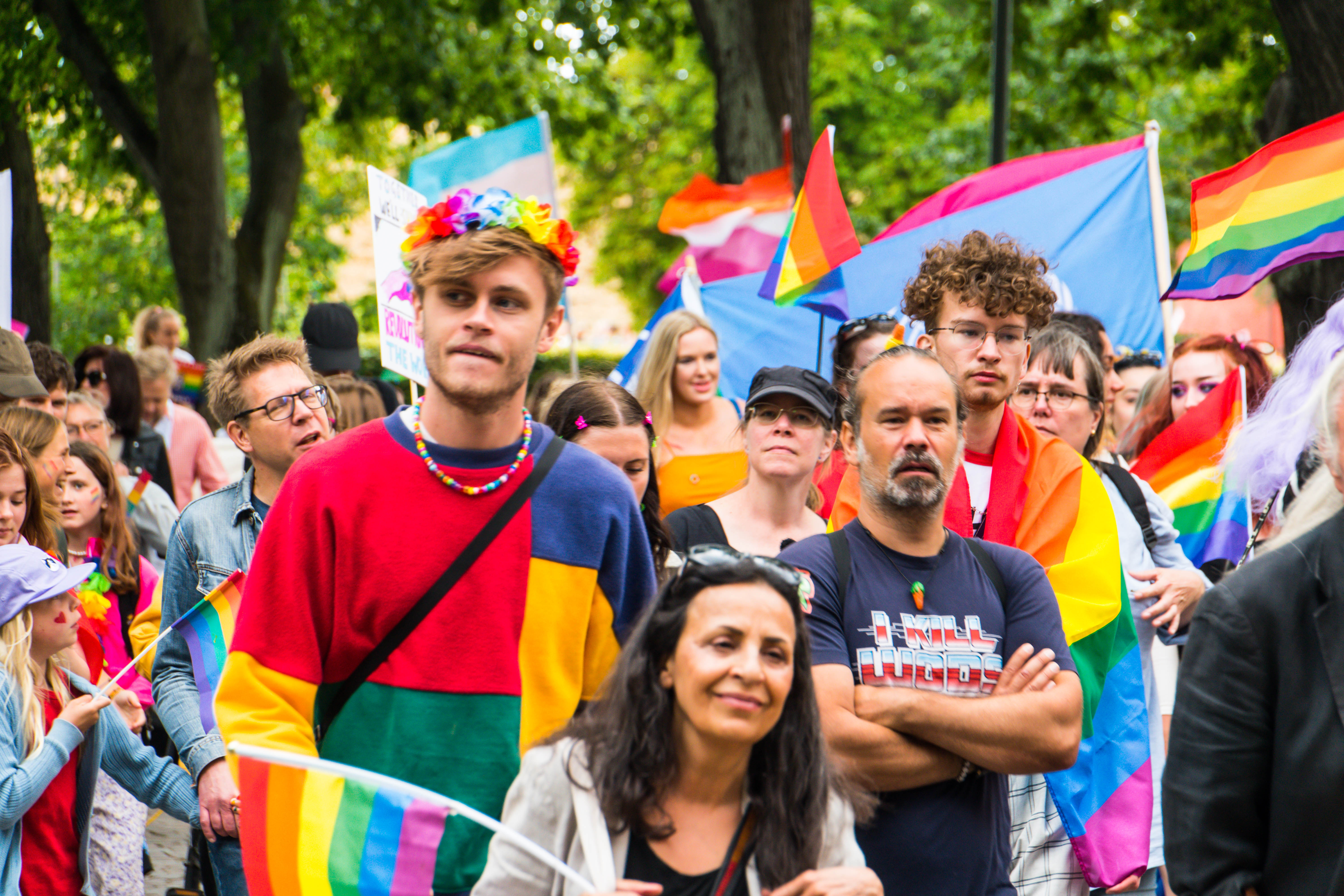
The 2022 Malmö Pride Parade.

This timeline features notable events in Swedish LGBTQ history.

== Pre-20th century ==
- 1608: Charles IX enacts Sweden's first secular law against sodomy in 1608, making the act punishable by death.
- 1734: The new Civil Code of 1734 contains no mention of sodomy.
- 1864: A new penal code is enacted, criminalizing same-sex activity regardless of gender as "fornication against nature" with a punishment of up to two years of hard labor.

== 20th century ==
=== Early 20th century ===
- 1932: Anders Vilhelm Lundstedt proposes a motion to decriminalize homosexual acts before the Riksdag. The motion is rejected by the Riksdag, but referred to the Board of Health for an opinion.
- 1944: Homosexual acts between consenting adults are decriminalized in Sweden.
- 1948: Lutheran pastor Karl-Erik Kejne publicly accuses a group of gay men of threatening and attempting to take his life. This marks the beginning of the Kejne affair, which popularized belief in a conspiracy theory concerning a secret homosexual organized crime ring that allegedly compromised powerful members of society and institutions.

=== 1950s ===
==== 1950 ====
- 8 March: Birger Sjödén, the director of a reform school, publishes the op-ed "The Homosexual Prostitution" (Swedish: Den homosexuella prostitutionen) in the newspaper Dagens Nyheter The piece called for action against "those who sexually abuse underage youths."
- 4 July: The moral panic stoked by Sjödén's article leads Stockholm's governor Johan Hagander to convene representatives from law enforcement, social services, the military and civil society groups. These parties concluded that action must be taken to protect to protect youth from male prostitution. The Hagander Committee was established to accomplish this, leading to increased surveillance and policing of gay men and their cruising practices centered around urinals, parks and bath houses.
- 21 October: The first LGBT organization in Sweden is founded in Solna. The group initially formed as a local chapter of the Danish organization Circle of 1948 (now LGBT+ Danmark).

==== 1952 ====
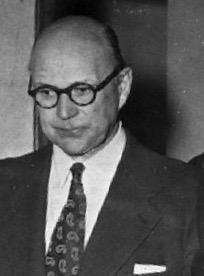
Kurt Haijby in 1952.

- 22 December: Restauranteur Kurt Hajiby is convicted of blackmail for alleging an affair with King Gustaf V to extort money from the Royal Court. Hajiby spent the next six years in jail.
- The Swedish chapter of the Circle of 1948 split off into an independent group called the National Organization for Sexual Equality (Swedish: Riksförbundet för sexuellt likaberättigande or RFSL).

==== 1955 ====
- RFSL begins to publish Följeslagaren (Companion), a periodical about LGBT issues.

=== 1960s ===
==== 1964 ====
- Eva-Lisa Bengtson founds Transvestia, the first organization for transgender people in Sweden. The first meetings were held the following year in Stockholm.

==== 1966 ====
- Full Personality Expression Sweden, a local chapter of the United States group Full Personality Expression, is founded as the country's first cross-dressing organization.
- The first Swedish commercial magazine aimed at a gay male audience, HOMO, is founded. The magazine ran until 1969.

==== 1969 ====
- The magazine Viking, later known as Revolt: against sexual prejudice (Swedish: Revolt: mot sexuella fördomar), is first published. Containing both pornography and serious features about gay rights, the magazine ran until 1986.

=== 1970s ===
==== 1971 ====
- 15 May: The Gay Power Club holds Sweden's first pride parade in Örebro.

==== 1972 ====
- 21 April: Sweden passes the Legal Gender Recognition Act, becoming the first country to allow transgender people to change their legal gender. Free gender reassignment treatment is introduced the same year.

==== 1973 ====
- Loge 70, the first BDSM and leather club in Sweden, is founded. The nightclub's logo was designed by Tom of Finland.

==== 1974 ====
- 30 November: LM in Gothenburg, the first leather group in Sweden, meets for the first time in Gothemburg. The group was inspired by the Danish organization SLM (Scandinavian Leather Men).

==== 1975 ====
- 2 May: The leather and BDSM group SLM Stockholm was founded. The group would go on to play an important role as a center of social support during the HIV/AIDS crisis.

==== 1977 ====
- RFSL holds its first liberation demonstration in Stockholm's Vasaparken in August. This demonstration evolved into an annual homosexual liberation week (Swedish: Homosexuella frigörelseveckan) event.

==== 1978 ====
- A government committee is established to investigate legal concerns and discrimination faced by homosexuals.

==== 1979 ====
- 29 August: The National Board of Health and Welfare declassifies homosexuality as a mental illness. The move followed a liberation week sit-in at the board's headquarters organized by the RFSL.
- The Benjamin Patient Association (Swedish: Patientföreningen Benjamin) is founded as Sweden's first group for trans women and trans men. The organization was an arm of the RFSL between 1980 and 1985.

=== 1980s ===
==== 1982 ====
- After the country's first reported HIV diagosis the year prior, the first official case of HIV/AIDS is diagnosed at Roslagstulls hospital in Stockholm.
- The first clinic for men who have sex with men is established at Södersjukhuset in Stockholm, where men can be tested for sexually transmitted infections.

==== 1987 ====
- 4 June: Under the pretext of preventing the spread of HIV and other sexually transmitted infections, a new law bans gay saunas clubs where sexual acts may take place. The ban was lifted in 2004.
- The Homosexual Cohabitees Act is enacted, which holds that same-sex couples who live together should receive the same legal treatment as heterosexual cohabitees. The law would go into effect the following year.
- The Swedish Penal Code is amended to ban discrimination based on homosexual orientation, later broadened to discrimination based on sexual orientation.

=== 1990s ===
==== 1991 ====
- 15 September: Following the country's general election, Swedish Social Democratic Party member Kent Carlsson becomes the first openly gay member representative to serve in the Riksdag.

==== 1994 ====
- The Registered Partnership Act allows same-sex couples to participate in a ceremony similar to a civil marriage, giving them the same rights as married couples with a few exceptions such as parenthood. The law would go into effect the following year.

==== 1995 ====
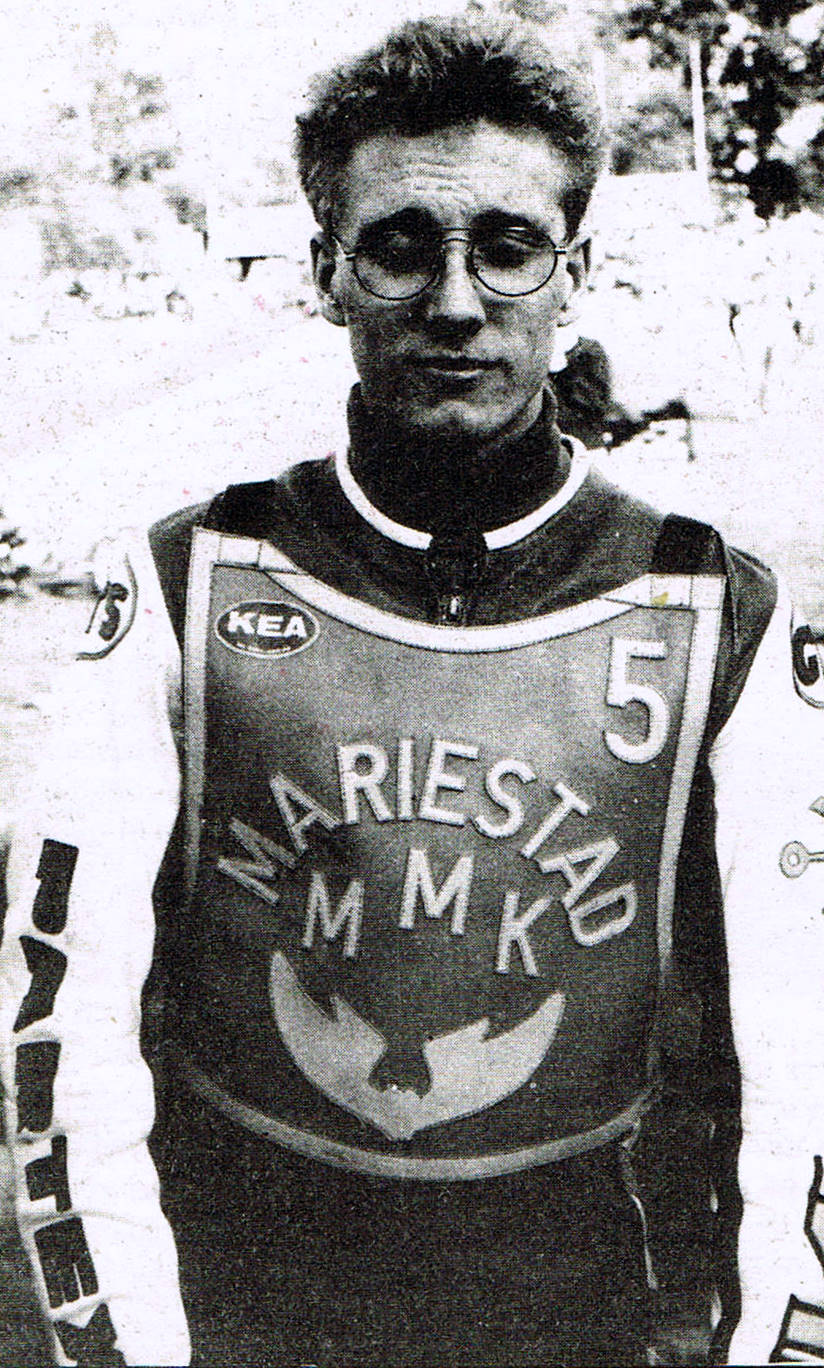
Peter Karlsson in 1993.

- 11 March: Ice hockey player Peter Karlsson is stabbed to death in Västerås by a 19-year-old member of a skinhead group with neo-Nazi ties. While the athlete was not openly gay, the man who confessed to the crime alleged that Karlsson had propositioned and grabbed him, which BBC reporter Trygve Skogseth retrospectively characterized as a gay panic defense. When police searched the man's home, they found anti-gay propaganda.
- The magazine QX is founded, which would go on to become the largest LGBT publisher in Scandinavia.

==== 1996 ====
- The first gay kiss on Swedish television occurs on an episode of the SVT soap opera Rederiet between the characters Micki (Ola Forssmed) and his love interest.

==== 1998 ====
- 8 August: Stockholm hosts the annual Europride festival for the first time. More than 300,000 people participate in the festivities.

==== 1999 ====
- The first annual Gaygalan Awards are presented by QX.
- The Prohibition of Discrimination in Working Life on Grounds of Sexual Orientation Act goes into effect, and the Ombudsman against Discrimination on Grounds of Sexual Orientation position is created.

== 21st century ==
=== 2000s ===
==== 2001 ====
- 20 December: The Equal Treatment of Students at University Act is passed. Aimed at ending discrimination for students and applicants in higher education, including discrimination on the basis of sexual orientation. The law would go into effect the following year.

==== 2002 ====
- 14 November: The Riksdag approves a reform to expand the legal definition of hate speech to include hate speech based on sexual orientation. The law went into effect on 1 January 2003.

==== 2003 ====
- 1 February: A new law gives same-sex registered partners the same consideration as married couples when applying for adoption.
- A new Cohabitees Act goes into effect, covering same-sex and heterosexual cohabitees alike.
- The Prohibition of Discrimination act goes into effect, banning discrimination based on sexual orientation in the workplace.

==== 2004 ====
- 31 March: The ban on sauna clubs is lifted, effective 1 July of the same year.

==== 2005 ====
- 22 April: Klubb Vega, the first sauna club to open following the lift of the sauna ban, opens in Stockholm.
- June: The Riksdag passes a law granting lesbian couples the right to assisted reproduction in public hospitals.
- The Prohibition of Discrimination Act is extended to ban discrimination based on sexual orientation in social programs such as healthcare system and unemployment insurance.

==== 2006 ====
- 23 February: Social Democratic Party member Elisebeht Markström comes out, becoming the first openly lesbian member of the Riksdag.
- The Act Prohibiting Discriminatory and other Degrading Treatment of Children and Pupils goes into effect, requiring schools to develop plans for equal treatment and banning discrimination based on sexual orientation in preschools, compulsory schools and upper secondary schools.
- 6 October: Andreas Carlgren and Tobias Billström become the first openly gay and bisexual Swedish cabinet members, respectively.

==== 2007 ====
- June: The first West Pride festival is celebrated in Gothenburg.

==== 2009 ====
- The Discrimination Act goes into effect, replacing prior anti-discrimination law and expanding protection based on sexual orientation, including for transgender individuals.
- The Marriage Code and other related statutes are made gender neutral, legalizing same sex marriage in Sweden.
- The National Board of Health and Welfare declassifies transvestitism as a mental illness.
- October: The Church of Sweden votes to not distinguish between marriage services for same-sex and straight couples.

==== 2013 ====
- Amendments to the Legal Gender Recognition Act take effect, enabling any Swedish resident in the population registration to change their legal gender regardless of citizenship status.
- The mandatory sterilization requirement of the Legal Gender Recognition Act is lifted.

==== 2016 ====
- Assistive reproductive services through the Swedish health care system become available to single women.

==== 2018 ====
- Those affected by the prior mandatory sterilization requirement of the Legal Gender Recognition Act become eligible for financial compensation.
- 1 July: Extended protections for transgender individuals in the criminal code take effect.

==== 2019 ====
- The Freedom of the Press Act is amended with stronger protections against hate crimes targeting transgender people.

=== 2020s ===
==== 2021 ====
- August: The 2021 World Pride festival is hosted jointly by Malmö Pride and Copenhagen Pride.

==== 2023 ====
- 4 March: Drag Race Sverige, the Swedish spinoff of the Drag Race franchise, debuts on WOW Presents Plus.

==== 2025 ====
- Changes to the Legal Gender Recognition Act take effect, allowing those 16 and older to change their legal gender with approval from a parent or legal guardian.

== See also ==
- LGBTQ rights in Sweden
