= LGBTQ history in Sweden =

LGBTQ history in Sweden involves the contributions, experiences, and social movements of lesbian, gay, bisexual, transgender, and queer people in Sweden.

== 17th–18th centuries ==
Cases of homosexuality were handled by Church courts until 1608, when the first secular anti-sodomy law was introduced via a 1608 legal appendix by Charles IX. It prescribed the death penalty for both parties, supported by Leviticus 20:13.

The Civil Code of 1734 did not mention homosexuality. Jonas Liliequist, a history professor at Umeå University, argued that this was due to "a shift in policy from deterrence to a policy of silence."

== 19th century ==
In 1864, Sweden introduced a new penal code which went into effect in 1865. In many ways the code was significantly more liberal than those from 1734 and 1779, as it banned extreme punishments such as death by torture and introduced the concept that punishments should be proportional to the crime. However it also criminalized homosexual sex acts. "Fornication against nature" was categorized with bestiality. Both could be penalized with up to two years of hard labour.

== 20th century ==
=== Decriminalization ===
Decriminalization of same-sex sexual activity in Sweden was first formally raised by Vilhelm Lundstedt in 1933, when he introduced a private motion to members of the Riksdag that argued for the removal of "fornication against nature" (Swedish: otukt mot naturen) from the criminal code. He suggested same-sex relations should be regulated similarly to heterosexual ones, with no restriction for consenting adults and provisions to prevent exploitation of vulnerable groups. The motion was rejected, but the Ministry of Justice referred the motion to the National Swedish Board of Health for consideration.

Although formally criminalized since 1864, convictions for same-sex activity were rare until the mid-1930s. Between 1935–1944, 753 men were convicted, representing 1.19 convictions per 100,000 people. Very few women were ever convicted using the statute.

Sex between consenting adults of the same sex was ultimately decriminalized in 1944.

=== Social stigma and moral panic ===
Although no longer illegal, the 1944 decriminalization set the age of consent for same-sex activity at 18, and 21 in situations of dependency, higher than the age of consent for heterosexual activity which was always set at 15. Only in 1978 was the age of consent equalized to 15 regardless of sexual orientation. Additionally, homosexuality was still considered to be a mental disorder following the decriminalization. Possible treatments for homosexuality included therapy, hypnosis, electroshock, and medications.

==== Sjödén article ====
On 8 March 1950, Birger Sjödén, a reform school principal, published "The Homosexual Prostitution" (Swedish: Den homosexuella prostitutionen) in Dagens Nyheter. In the article, he wrote that many imprisoned boys he had met were exploited or coerced into prostitution by homosexual men. Sjödén argued this was a direct result of decriminalization and increased societal permissiveness. The publication was characteristic of concerns about homosexual predation that were common in Sweden during the 1950s. In response to the moral panic, the governor of Stockholm created the Hagander Committee, which authorized police investigation into gay culture and surveillance of meeting places, with a focus on urinals, parks, and bathhouses.

=== RFSL ===
The first homosexual organization in Sweden was founded at a meeting in Solna on 21 October 1950 as a branch of the Association of 1948 (Danish: Forbundet af 1948). Allan Hellman, an engineer from Lysekil, was one of the first people to openly identify himself as a homosexual in the media, had organized the gathering. There were 35 men and one woman in attendance. In 1952, the group split off from the Danish group and assumed its own name, the National Federation for Sexual Equality (Swedish: Riksförbundet för sexuellt likaberättigande), or the RFSL. Discretion and secrecy were considered paramount. People used pseudonyms and had to be recommended by existing members to join. RFSL initially focused on organizing social activities for gay men and women to combat the effects of societal isolation.

=== Gay liberation ===
In response to the Stonewall rebellion in 1969, the RFSL became more engaged with the gay liberation movement, and worked to increase their political activity and public visibility. The first pride demonstration in Europe was held in Örebro on 15 May 1971 by the Gay Power Club. There were approximately 16 participants, carrying signs advocating for equality for homosexuals and bisexuals. Vanja Södergren, who attended and helped plan the event, described it as silent.

On 29 August 1979, the RFSL organized a sit-in at the National Board of Health and Welfare to coincide with their Liberation Week. Around 40 people gathered in the main stairwell of the agency's office with banners and began chanting. The police were called, but before there could be any intervention Barbro Westerholm, then the Minister for Health and Social Affairs, met with the activists. With her support, homosexuality and bisexuality were soon declassified as mental diseases.

The first openly homosexual person elected to the Riksdag was Kent Carlsson, a gay Social Democrat, in 1991.

In the 1980s and 1990s, multiple gay men were murdered in alleged hate crimes. A notable case was that of ice hockey player Peter Karlsson, who was walking home in Västerås in 1995 when he was attacked by a 19-year old man with ties to a neo-Nazi skinhead group. The assailant claimed a gay panic defense and was sentenced to eight years for manslaughter. Critics felt the brutality of the crime (Karlsson was stabbed 64 times) and the anti-gay literature found in the perpetrator's home was not given sufficient consideration in sentencing.

In 1995, Sweden became the third country in the world to introduce registered partnerships for same-sex couples, after Denmark and Norway.

== 21st century ==
The first openly lesbian woman in the Riksdag was Elisebeht Markström of the Social Democrats. Elected in 1995, she confirmed her sexuality in a 2006 interview with QX.

=== Same-sex marriage ===
Same-sex marriage was legalized on 1 May 2009, following the adoption of a gender-neutral marriage law by the Riksdag on 1 April of the same year. Sweden was the second in Scandinavia, the fifth in Europe, and the seventh in the world to open marriage to same-sex couples nationwide. On 22 October 2009, the governing board of the Church of Sweden voted to allow its priests to wed same-sex couples in church ceremonies. Priests who did not want to perform same-sex marriages would be permitted to refuse, although substitutions had to be found.

== See also ==
- LGBTQ rights in Sweden
- LGBTQ rights by country or territory
- Same-sex marriage in Sweden
- Timeline of LGBTQ history in Sweden
