= Stockholm Pride =

LGBTQ pride festival in Sweden

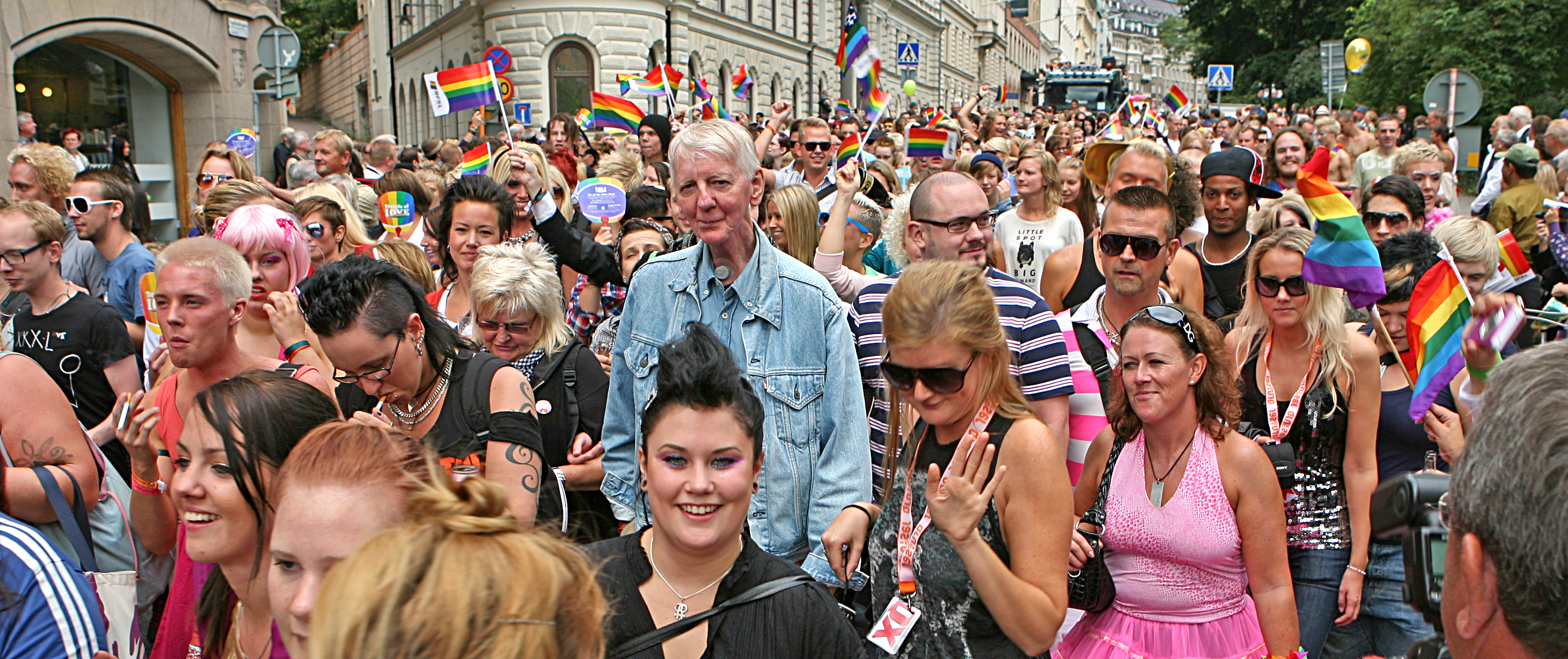
- 2009 Stockholm Pride Parade
- Status: active
- Genre: festivals
- Frequency: Annually in late-July and early-August
- Location: Stockholm
- Country: Sweden
- Inaugurated: 1998; 28 years ago
- Website: http://www.stockholmpride.org/en/

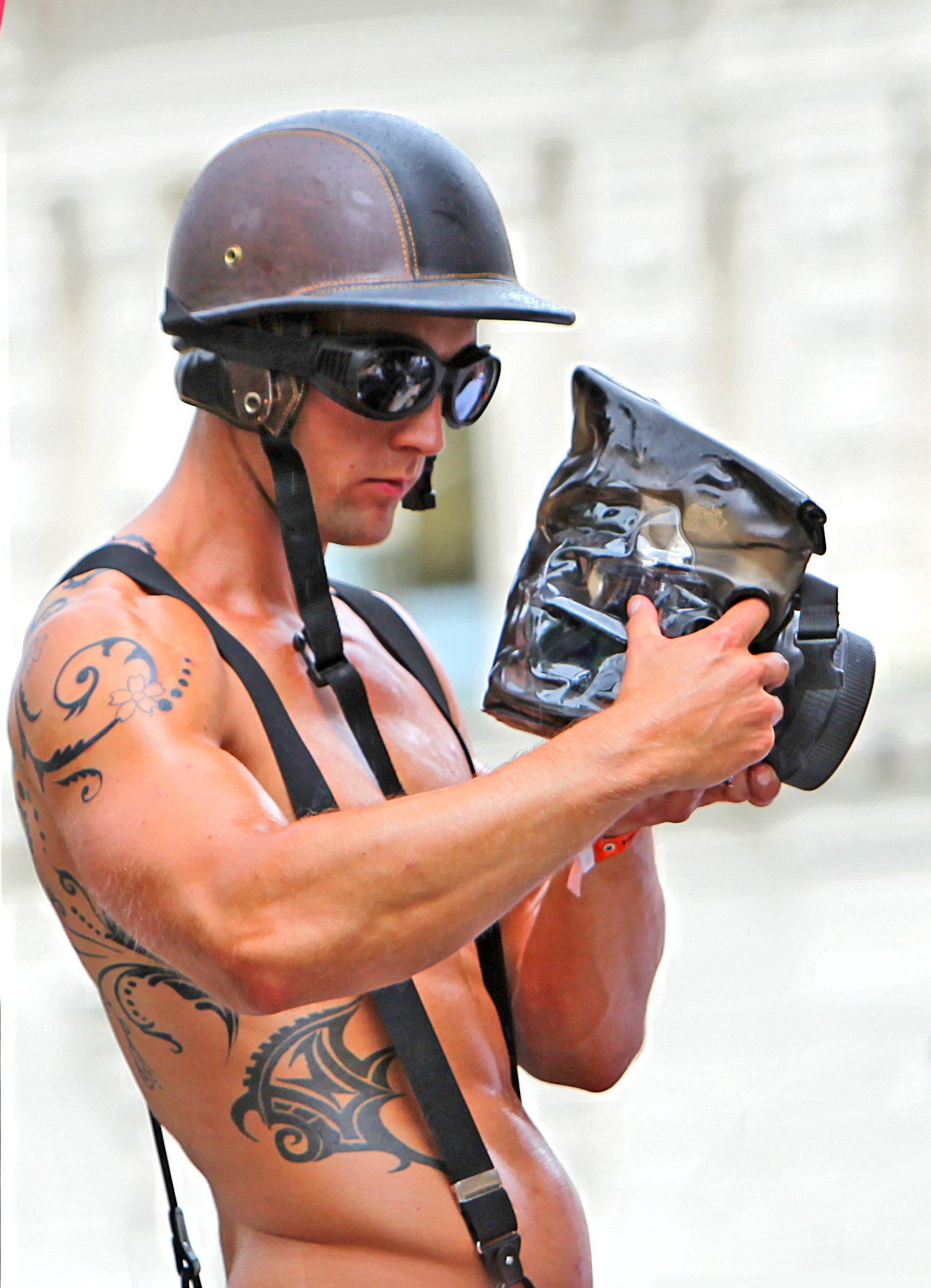
Body art at Stockholm Pride 2009

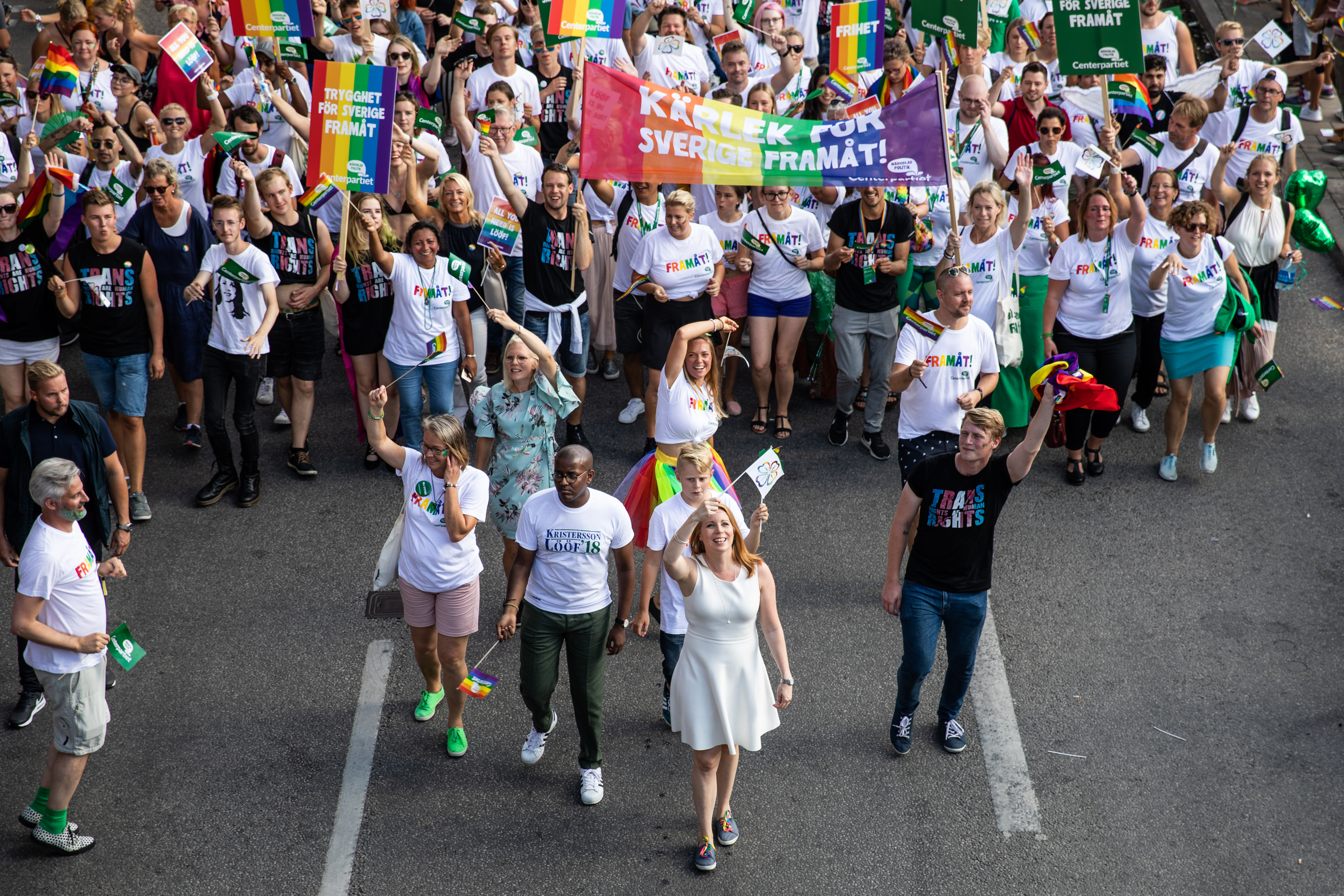
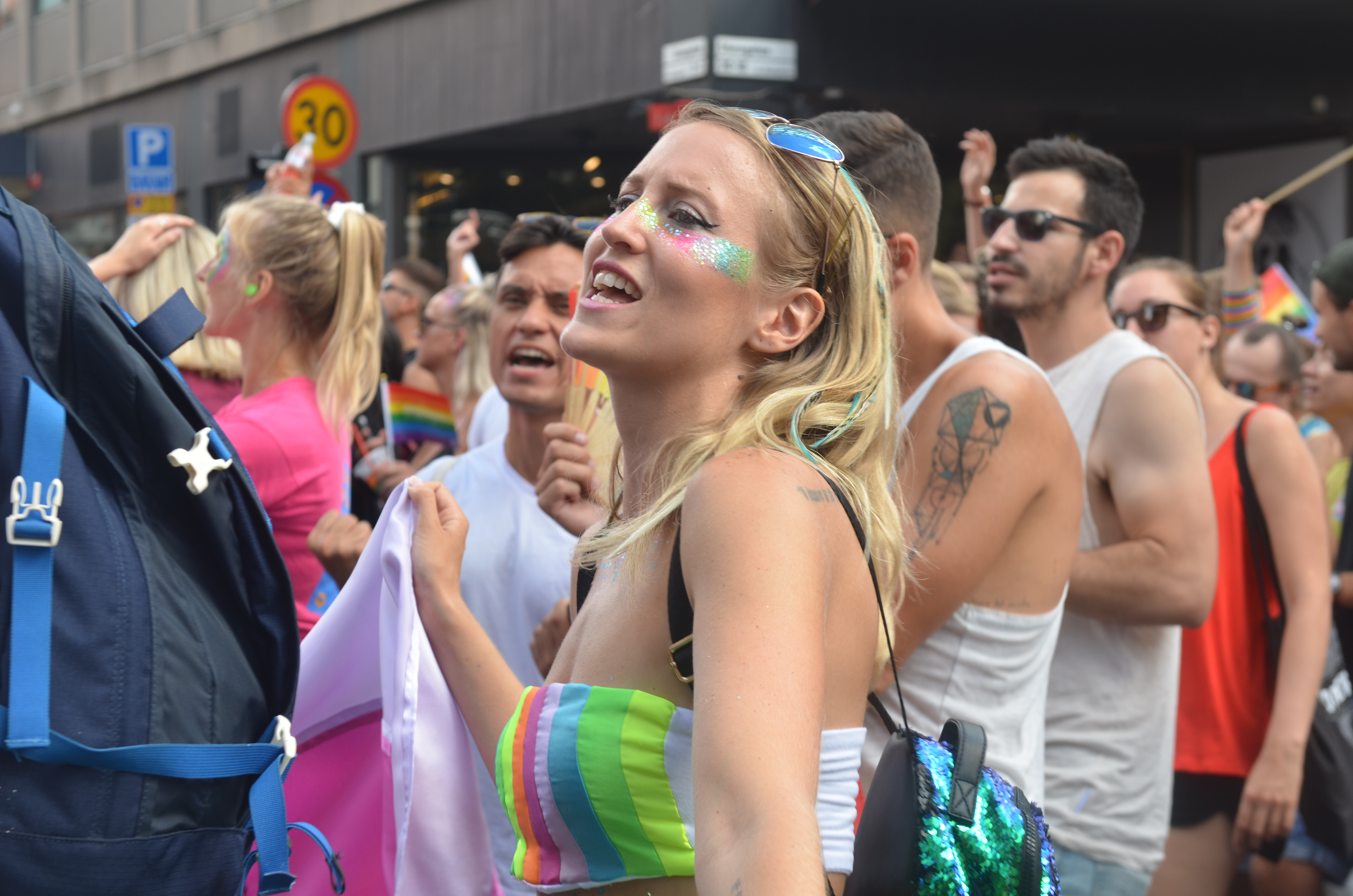
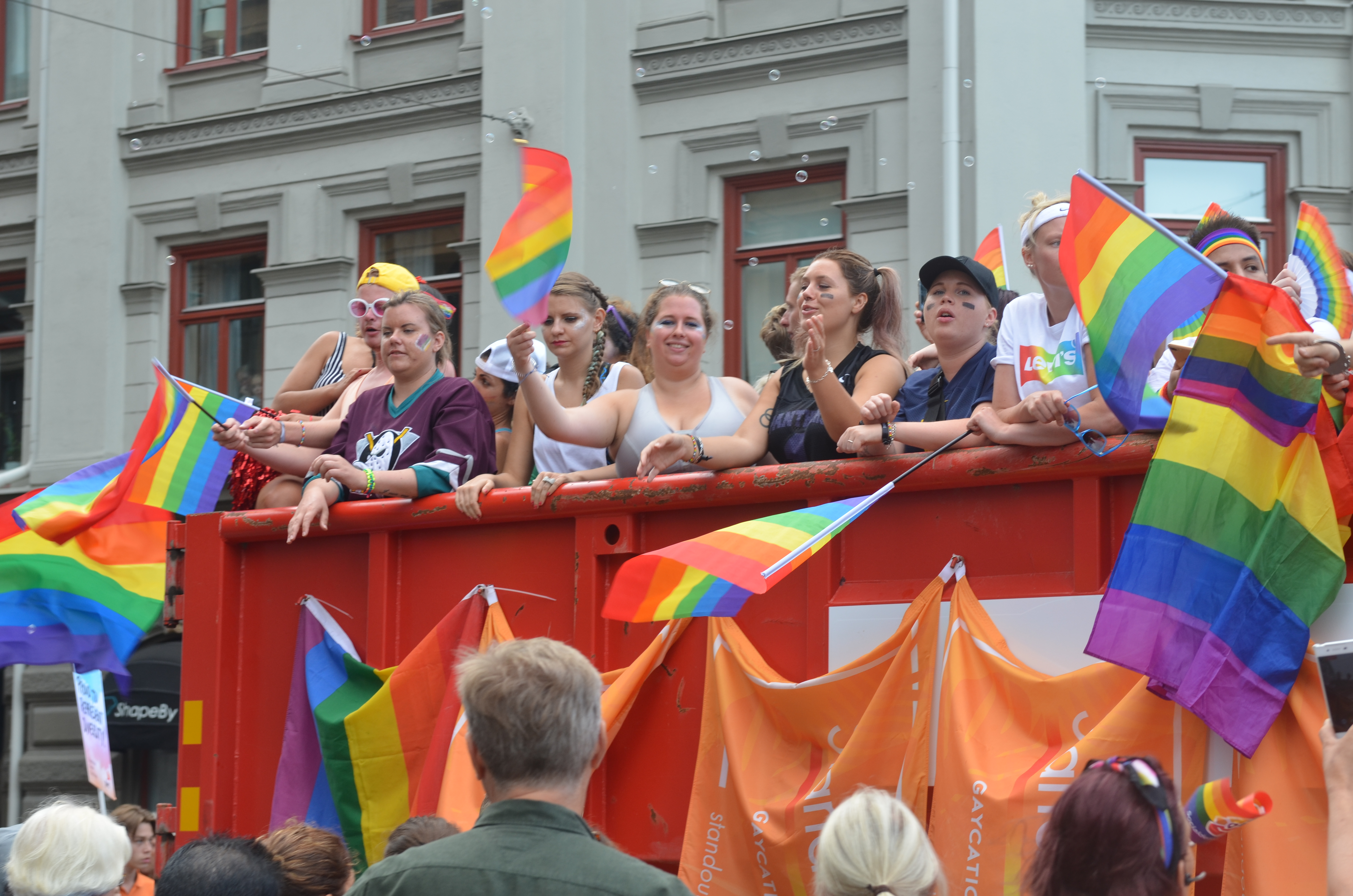
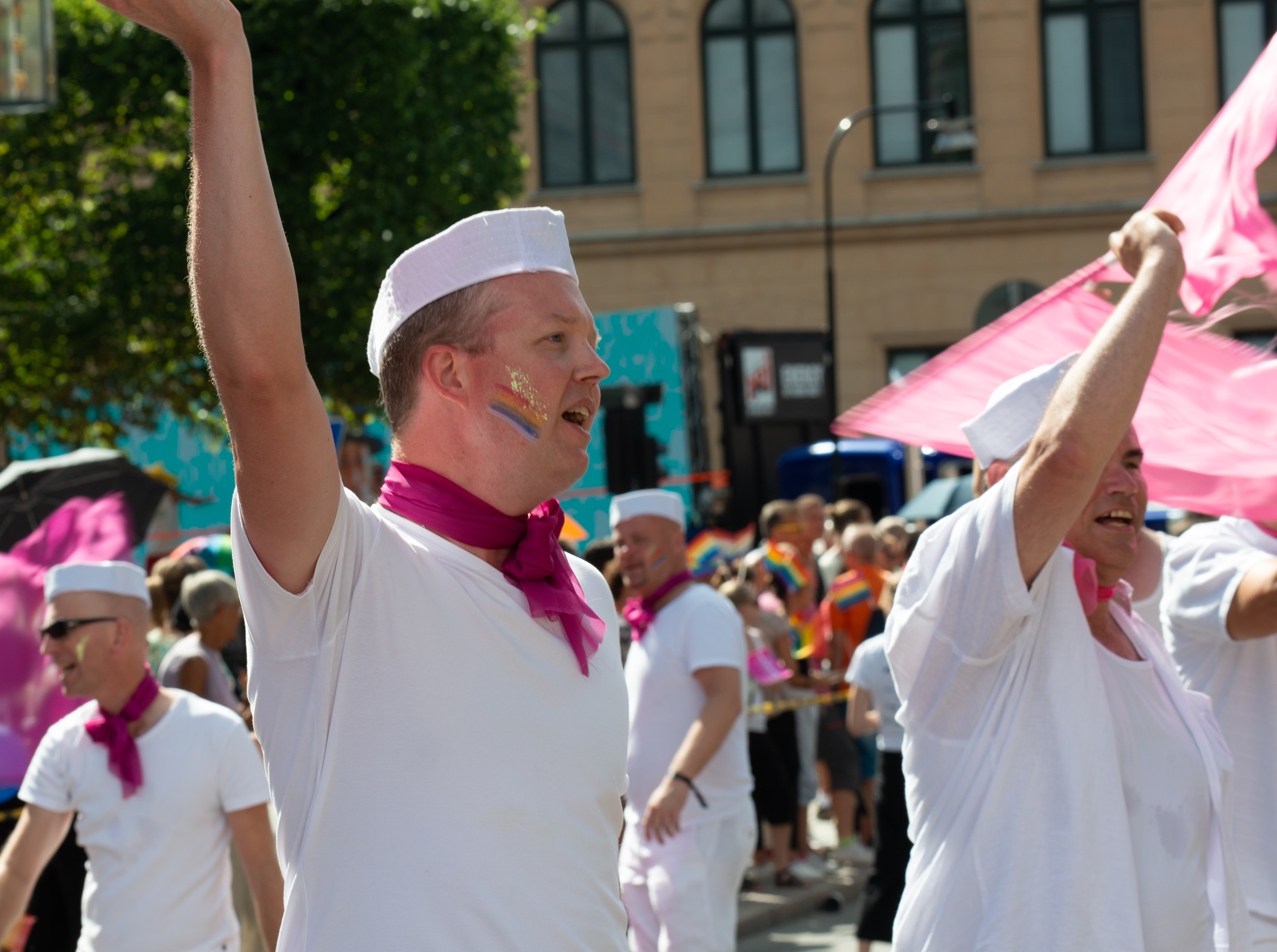
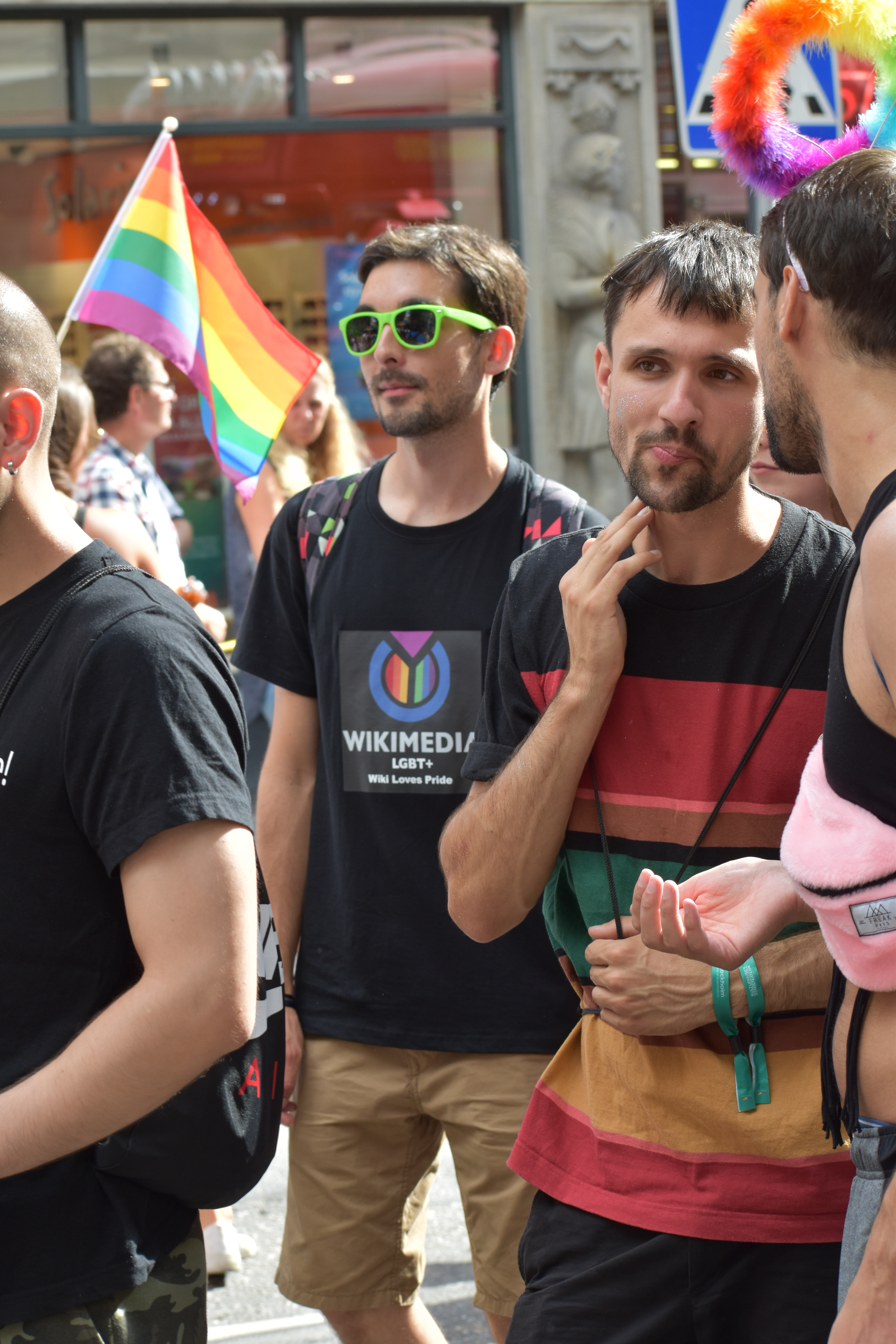
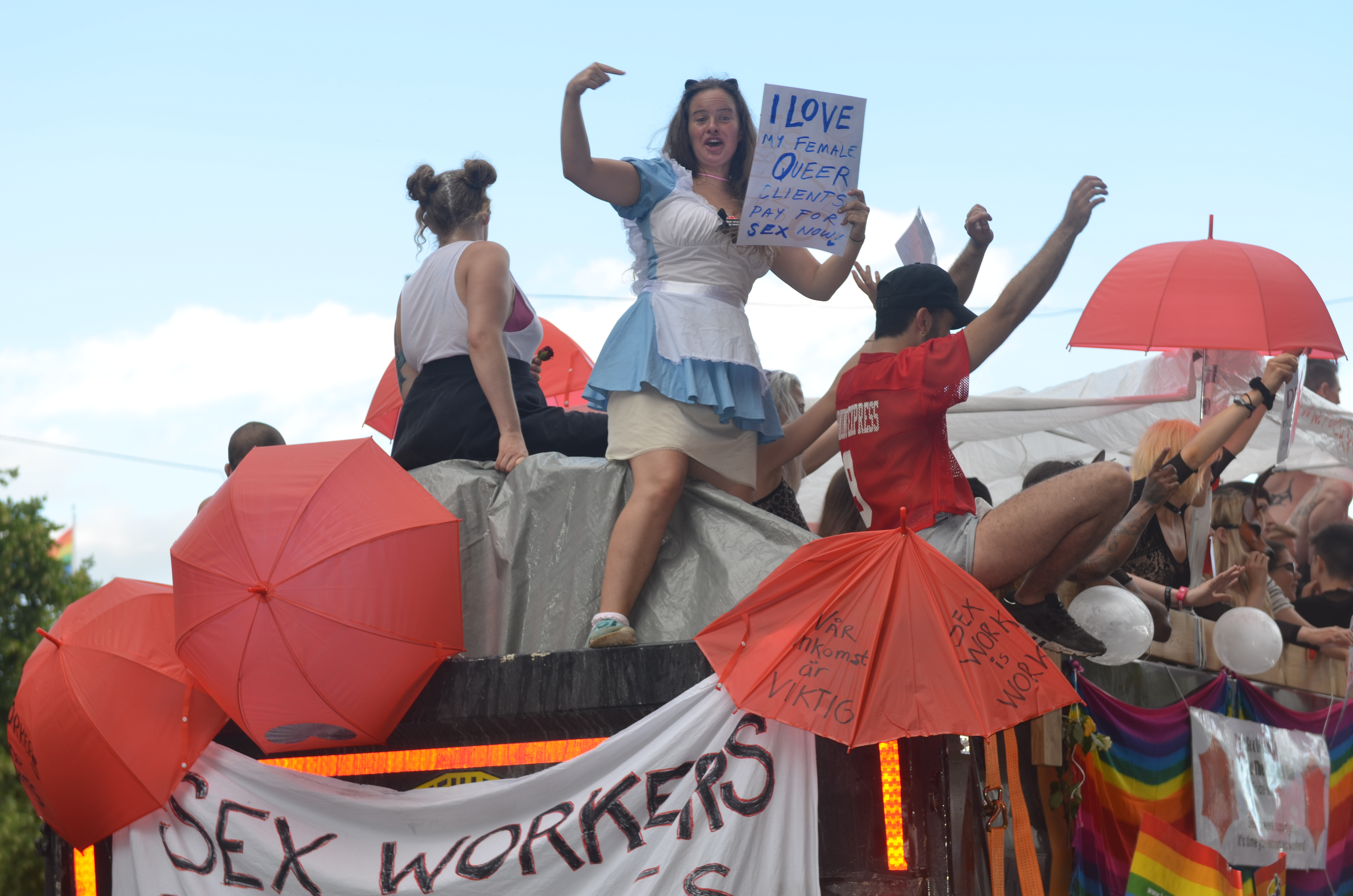
Stockholm Pride 2018

Stockholm Pride (styled as STHLM Pride) is an annual LGBT pride festival, put on by the non-profit Stockholm Pride Association, held in Stockholm, the capital of Sweden. Since 1998, Stockholm Pride has grown and is now the largest pride event in Scandinavia. The event now involves approximately 60,000 parade participants and 600,000 attendees. It takes place in late July or early August.

The event involves multiple offerings including Pride House (workshops, author talks, debates), Pride Kinky (an exploration of BDSM), Pride Park (artists, exhibitors, restaurants and bars), Pride Youth (an event for people age 13-20), and the Pride Parade.

In 1998, 2008 and 2018, Stockholm Pride was the host of the EuroPride.

== History ==
Various historical moments involving Stockholm Pride include:

- 1998 – Stockholm Pride hosts EuroPride.
- 2008 – Stockholm Pride is the host of EuroPride for the second time.
- 2014 – Prime Minister Fredrik Reinfeldt becomes the first Swedish Prime Minister to march in Stockholm Pride.
- 2015 – Prime Minister Stefan Löfven chooses not to march in the Stockholm Pride Parade, citing other commitments.
- 2017 – Stockholm Pride featured a 3-mile parade with 45,000 participants and 500,000 spectators, including same-sex weddings conducted by Mayor Karin Wanngård.
- 2018 – Stockholm Pride cohosts EuroPride with West Pride, with a performance by Markus Krunegård and the Stockholm Gay Choir, and Banarama.
- 2019 – The event commemorated the 40th anniversary of homosexuality being declassified as a mental illness in Sweden. Performers include the Village People, Pussy Riot and Icona Pop.
- 2022 – Opera singer Rickard Söderberg leads a opera singalong in the Pride Park with 25 of Sweden's most well-known opera stars.
- 2023 – The event is opened with a speech from Helena Westin, one of the founders of Stockholm Pride.

== Dog tag ==
Each year, a unique design accessory is created to accompany the Stockholm Pride festival event. The Dog tag is chosen through a design competition, alternating internationally renowned names such as Jean Paul Gaultier, Efva Attling, Lars Wallin and young debutant designer.

=== Dog tag designers ===
- 1998 – Efva Attling (silver plate pendant)
- 1999 – Camilla Wessman (white plastic plate)
- 2000 – Tom Hedqvist (rubberband spelling "faith", "hope" and "love")
- 2001 – Lars Wallin (leather strap with rhinestones)
- 2002 – Christer Lindarw (silver keychain with silver plate)
- 2003 – Andy Gunnarsson (wrist-sweatband)
- 2004 – Louise Häggberg (puzzle piece that could be fitted with other pieces)
- 2005 – Lars Eriksson (flower)
- 2006 – Magnus Skogsberg (bag)
- 2007 – Margaretha Julle (tie)
- 2008 – Jake Rydqvist (pendant that could be lit up)
- 2009 – Alessandro Falca (silver plate with braille text spelling "Hetero")
- 2010 – Sofia Priftis (scarf)
- 2011 – Karolina Tullberg (tin bracelet, with the message "Alltid Öppen" – "Always Open")
- 2012 – Bea Szenfeld (metal container with unscrewable lid, containing confetti and a message)
- 2013 – Jean Paul Gaultier (silver-coloured berlock with the message "It is beautiful to be what you are")
- 2014 – Jessy Heuvelink (unisex leather bracelet engraved with the message "Celebrate Diversity")
- 2015 – Gunn Lundemo and Kristin Ampar (antique metal chain with a shiny plated ring called "aringtofreedom")
- 2016 – Designed in collaboration with the Swedish company Molind.
- 2017 – Amanda Oscarsson (gold necklace with triangle pendant)
- 2018 – There was no dog tag in 2018.
- 2019 – Mariette Hansson and Jenny Hansson (necklace with plexiglass rod)
- 2020 – Cancelled due to the pandemic.
- 2021 – Peter Englund (brass charm)
- 2022 – Tone Sekelius (XXX inspired by the theme "Time to confess your color")
- 2023 – Efva Attling (graphic necklace with the number 25 to celebrate Stockholm Pride's 25th anniversary)

2023 was the last year Stockholm Pride made the dog tag.

== See also ==
- LGBT rights in Sweden
