= Swedish Federation for Lesbian, Gay, Bisexual and Transgender Rights =

LGBTQ organization in Sweden

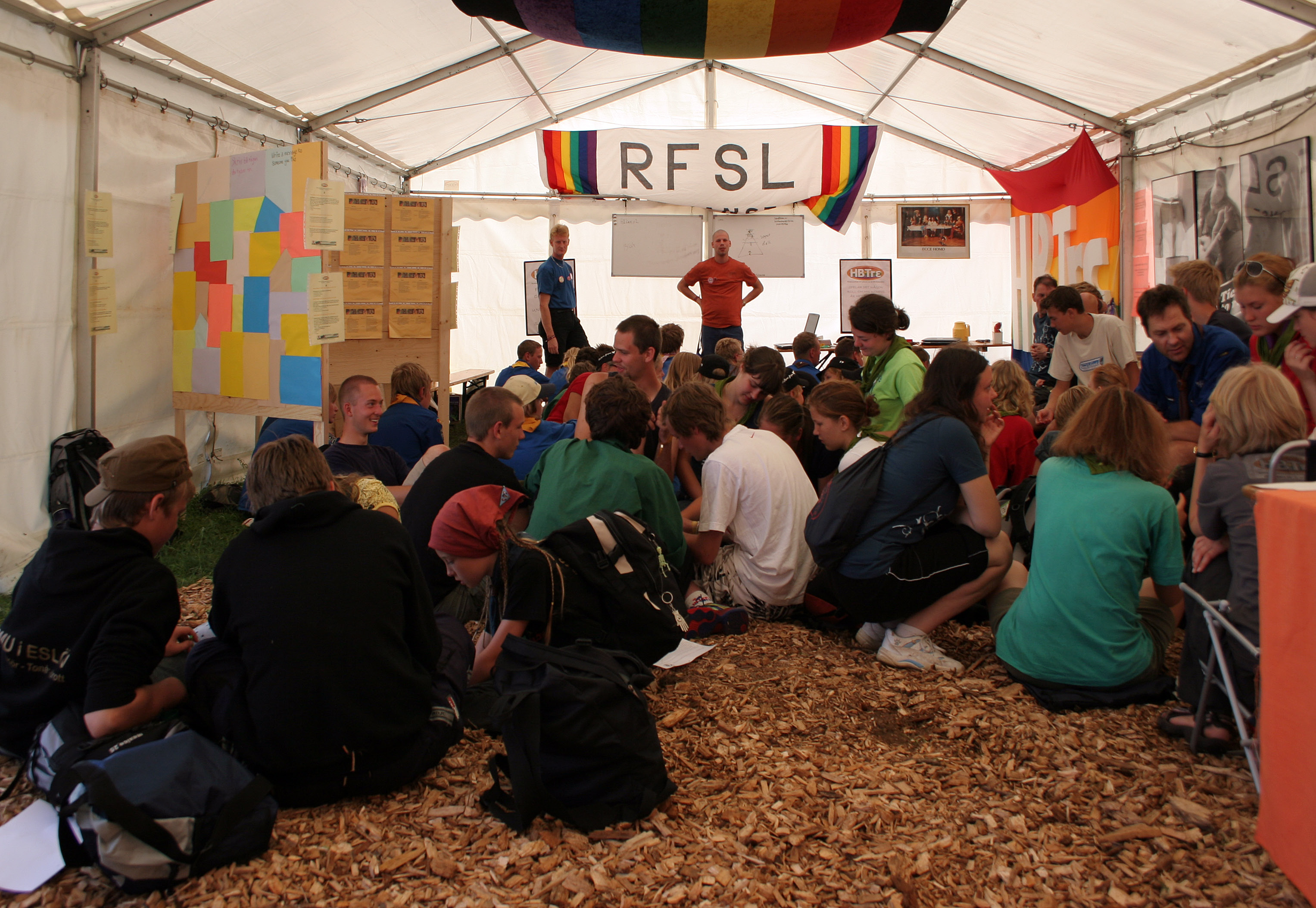
RFSL holding a seminar at the Jiingijamborii national Scout jamboree in Rinkaby

The Swedish Federation for Lesbian, Gay, Bisexual, Transgender and Queer Rights (Swedish: Riksförbundet för homosexuellas, bisexuellas, transpersoners och queeras rättigheter, RFSL, formerly Riksförbundet för sexuellt likaberättigande) is a Swedish organization working for LGBT rights. The RFSL describes itself as one of the oldest still-operating LGBTQ organizations in the world. As of 2018, it had about 7,000 members and has 36 regional offices spread over the country.

== History ==
RFSL was founded at a meeting in Solna on 21 October 1950 as a branch of the Association of 1948 (Danish: Forbundet af 1948). Allan Hellman, one of the first people to openly identify himself as a homosexual in the media, had organized the gathering. There were 35 men and one woman in attendance.

In 1952, the group split off from the Danish group and assumed its own name, the Swedish Federation for Sexual Equality (Swedish: Riksförbundet för sexuellt likaberättigande), or the RFSL. It initially focused on organizing social activities for gay people to combat the effects of societal isolation.

In response to the Stonewall rebellion in 1969, the RFSL became more engaged with the gay liberation movement, and worked to increase their political activity and public visibility.

On 29 August 1979, the RFSL organized a sit-in at the National Board of Health and Welfare to coincide with their Liberation Week. Around 40 people gathered in the main stairwell of the agency's office with banners and began chanting. The police were called, but before there could be any intervention Barbro Westerholm, then the Minister for Health and Social Affairs, met with the activists. With her support, homosexuality and bisexuality were soon declassified as mental diseases.

RFSL was a major lobbyist for same-sex marriage, a goal that was reached in April 2009 after 50 years of working with that specific issue.

In July 2007, RFSL received consultative status with the United Nations Economic and Social Council.

Lawyer and social worker Trifa Shakely was elected as the new president in 2021.

== See also ==
- LGBTQ history in Sweden
- LGBTQ rights in Sweden
- List of LGBTQ rights organizations
- Ombudsman against Discrimination on Grounds of Sexual Orientation
