= LGBTQ rights in Sweden =

- Location of Sweden (dark green) – in Europe (light green & dark grey) – in the European Union (light green) – [Legend]
- Legal status: Legal since 1944, age of consent equalized in 1972
- Gender identity: Right to change legal gender since 1972; no sterilization or surgery required since 2013
- Military: LGBTQ people are allowed to serve openly
- Discrimination protections: Sexual orientation and gender identity/expression protections (see below)

Family rights
- Recognition of relationships: Same-sex marriage since 2009
- Adoption: Full adoption rights since 2003

Lesbian, gay, bisexual, transgender, and queer (LGBTQ) rights in Sweden are regarded as some of the most progressive in Europe and the world. Same-sex sexual activity was legalized in 1944 and the age of consent was equalized to that of heterosexual activity in 1972. Sweden also became the first country in the world to allow transgender people to change their legal gender post-sex reassignment surgery in 1972, whilst transvestism was declassified as an illness in 2009. Legislation allowing legal gender changes without hormone replacement therapy and sex reassignment surgery was passed in 2013.

After allowing same-sex couples to register for partnership benefits in 1995, Sweden became the seventh country in the world to legalize same-sex marriage in 2009. Discrimination on the basis of sexual orientation has been banned since 1987 and on the basis of gender identity and expression since 2010. Gay and lesbian couples can petition to adopt since 2003, and lesbian couples have had equal access to IVF and assisted insemination since 2005. Sweden has been recognized as one of the most socially liberal European countries, with recent polls indicating that a large majority of Swedes support LGBTQ rights and same-sex marriage. Polling from the 2019 Eurobarometer showed that 98 percent of Swedes believed gay and bisexual people should have the same rights as heterosexual people, the highest in the European Union, and 92 per cent supported same-sex marriage. The proliferation of LGBTQ rights in Sweden appears to have further facilitated the inclusion of gays, lesbians and bisexuals in democratic action. However, recent years have seen the rise of anti-gender campaigns in Sweden, which scholars warn pose a growing threat to LGBTQ rights, particularly those of transgender people.

== Law regarding same-sex sexual activity ==
Sweden legalised same-sex sexual activity in 1944, with the age of consent set at 18. In 1987, in order to combat the spread of HIV, the Riksdag passed a law against sex in gay saunas and against prostitution. It was repealed in 2004. In 1972, Sweden became the first country in the world to allow transgender people to legally change their sex, provided free hormone therapy, and an equal age of consent was set at 15. However, the requirements under the 1972 act for changing gender included being unmarried, a Swedish citizen and infertile. This was followed by an activist occupation of the main office of the National Board of Health and Welfare. In October 1979, Sweden joined the few other countries in the world at the time to declassify homosexuality as an illness. Being transgender was declassified as an illness in 2017.

== Recognition of same-sex relationships ==
=== Registered partnership ===
Same-sex couples in Sweden had the right to register their partnerships from 1995 onwards. These partnerships had all the rights of marriages except "as provided by sections 3–4" of the law. As well, all provisions of a statute or any other legislation related to marriage or spouses applied to registered partnerships and partners, except as under sections 3–4.

Since May 2009, new registered partnerships can no longer be entered into due to the legalization of same-sex marriage. The status of existing partnerships remains unaltered, except that they can be converted to marriage if the couple so desires.

=== Same-sex marriage ===
Effective 1 May 2009, marriage between two people of the same sex has been legal in Sweden after a government report published in March 2007, written by former Chancellor of Justice Hans Regner, proposing that marriage be extended to same-sex couples.

On 1 April 2009, the Riksdag voted on a change to the law, legalizing same-sex marriages. All parties supported the proposal, with the exception of the Christian Democrats. The Swedish Cabinet Government, under whom this legislation was passed, consisted of the Moderate Party, the Centre Party, the Liberals and the Christian Democrats.

Vote totals	Votes
Yes	261
No	22
Abstain	16
Absent	50

On 22 October 2009, the Assembly of the Church of Sweden voted in favour of giving its blessing to same-sex couples, including the use of the term for marriage: äktenskap ("matrimony"). The new rules were introduced on 1 November 2009.

Vote totals	Votes
Yes	176
No	62
Abstain	11
Absent	0

=== Royal family in Sweden ===
The Swedish Act of Succession requires a prince or princess to seek the consent of the government to marry. In October 2021, Marshal of the Realm Fredrik Wersäll stated that a potential marriage would not be treated differently depending on if it would be same-sex or not, allowing members of the royal family to enter into a same-sex marriage without affecting their rights in the order of succession.

== Adoption and family planning ==
Since 1 February 2003, registered partners have had the same adoption rights as married couples. Single LGBTQ individuals are permitted to adopt as well. With regard to foreign adoptions, the Ministry of Justice states: "As regards adoption from abroad, it is important that we are sensitive and aware that those countries with which Sweden cooperates often hold a different view on homosexual people and homosexual parenthood. Co-operation regarding intercountry adoptions must be based on trust. This means that the limitations and terms that the countries of origin lay down must be complied with."

In 2005, a new law was passed allowing lesbian couples to access assisted insemination in public hospitals.

== Military service ==
LGBTQ people are not banned from military service. Sweden explicitly allows LGBTQ people to serve openly in the military. Sweden was amongst the first nations in the world to allow LGBTQ people to serve. In fact, gay men were allowed to serve even before Sweden demedicalized homosexuality in 1979.

The Swedish Armed Forces states that it actively works for an environment where individuals do not feel it to be necessary to hide their sexual orientation or gender identity. In 2015, they launched a Pride campaign featuring a soldier in uniform with the rainbow flag badged to her arm. The text's bold letters translates to "some things you should not have to camouflage," followed by the text "equality is an important ingredient in a democracy. In the military, we treat each other with respect and see our differences as a strength. We are an inclusive organisation where all who serve and contribute should feel welcomed and respected".

== Transgender rights ==
Sweden was the first country in to introduce a law on gender recognition. The ability to legally change the gender marker on official identification documents in Sweden has been possible since 1972. However, certain criteria had to be met: one had to be a Swedish citizen and 18 years old, unmarried (having divorced if necessary), have lived for two years as the opposite gender, be sterilized and have undergone sex reassignment surgery. The law was re-evaluated in 2007, proposing removals of the requirements to be a Swedish citizen, unmarried and sterilized, and presented to the Christian Democrat Minister for Health and Social Affairs.

The Swedish Discrimination Ombudsman (DO) and the Swedish Federation for Lesbian, Gay, Bisexual and Transgender Rights (RSFL) inquired about the future of the proposed new law. In January 2013, the Stockholm Administrative Court of Appeal deemed that the requirements to be sterilized and undergo sex reassignment surgery in order to change gender violated the constitution and the European Convention on Human Rights, (Note: The court found the requirement to be sterilized and undergo sex reassignment surgery violated chapter 2, article 8 of the Instrument of Government in addition to article 8 and 14 of the European Convention on Human Rights.) and the requirement was thus de facto abolished. In May 2013, the Riksdag passed a motion to remove the requirements. The revised law entered into force in July 2013.

In March 2017, the Löfven Government announced it would compensate an estimated 800 transgender people who were forced to undergo sex reassignment surgery and be sterilized so as to have their sex legally reassigned. In late March 2018, the Swedish Parliament voted in favour of the compensation. Approximately 600-700 people were eligible to receive 225,000 SEK each. This made Sweden the first country to compensate transgender people who were victims of forced sterilization as a requirement to attain legal gender recognition.

In January 2018, the majority of the parties in the Riksdag were interested in researching the possibility of introducing a third legal gender on official documents.

=== Gender law reform ===
In February 2015, the Löfven Government introduced two bills. The first one allowing legal gender change without any form of psychiatric or psychological evaluation as well as the need of a diagnosis or any kind of medical intervention. The other one allowing sex reassignment surgery if the person applying for it submits a positive opinion from a psychiatrist. As of 2019, the bills remained pending and had been the subject of several public consultations. As of August 2020, the bills were still in an early draft form. In November 2021 a new proposal was sent for consideration to various governmental and non-governmental organisations.

In July 2022 the government submitted a new law proposal to the Legislative Council. This proposal changed the requirements in the law for a legal gender change, which in previous drafts had been changed to an administrative process, to still require a simplified medical process. It also includes an increase of the proposed age at which the legal gender can be changed from the previous 12 to 16. As of July 2022 the Löfven government planned to present the law for a vote in the Riksdag after the election in September, with the law to take force on 1 October 2024.

In April 2024, a majority of the Riksdag voted in favor of both bills, with 234 votes in favour and 94 votes against. The new laws are due to take effect on 1 July 2025. Under the approved laws, the minimum age to change legal gender without the requirement of a diagnosis of gender dysphoria was lowered from age 18 to age 16. A statement from a doctor or psychologist on the permanence of the gender identity "for the foreseeable future" and approval from the National Board of Health and Welfare will still be required. Persons aged 16 and 17 will also need approval of their legal guardians. Surgical procedures of the genitalia will be allowed for those above 18, with removal of the gonads being limited to those 23 years of age or older without an exceptional reason.

=== Access to healthcare ===
In Sweden, patients seeking to access gender affirming healthcare must first undergo extended evaluations with psychiatric professionals, during which they must - without any form of medical transition - successfully live for one full year as their desired gender in all professional, social, and personal matters. Gender clinics are recommended to provide patients with wigs and breast prostheses for the endeavor. Further, those with potential comorbidities are subject to additional long-term scrutiny prior to allowance of any sort of access to medical care. The evaluation additionally involves, if possible, meetings with family members and/or other individuals close to the patient. Patients may be denied care for any number of "psychosocial dimensions", including their choice of job or their marital status.

Sweden's Karolinska Institute, administrator of the second-largest hospital system in the country, announced in March 2021 that it would discontinue providing puberty blockers or Gender-Affirming Hormone Therapy to children and teens under 16. Additionally, the Karolinska Institute changed its policy to cease providing puberty blockers or cross-sex hormones to teenagers 16–18, outside of approved clinical trials. On 22 February 2022, Sweden's National Board of Health and Welfare said that puberty blockers should only be used in "exceptional cases" and said that their use is backed by "uncertain science". However, this new guidance is a recommendation and is not comparable to a ban on the treatments.

Additionally, other providers in Sweden continue to provide puberty blockers, and a clinician's professional judgment determines what treatments are recommended or not recommended. Youth are able to access gender-affirming care when doctors deem it medically necessary. Sweden has not banned gender-affirming care for minors and it is offered as part of its national healthcare service. However, misinformation that Sweden had banned gender-affirming care for minors proliferated on social media and some Republican politicians in the United States have used this misinformation to justify their outright bans on the treatments. Nationwide data from the National Board of Health and Welfare released in 2026 found that the number of trans children prescribed puberty blockers in Sweden had actually slightly increased in the years since the board issued their 2022 guidance.

In 2021, the Swedish National Board of Health and Welfare reduced the number of clinics allowed to provide gender affirming healthcare from seven to three. Those three clinics have yet to be chosen.

== Discrimination protections ==
Unfair discrimination against gay men, lesbians and bisexuals has been outlawed under the Penal Code since 1987. In 2008, transgender identity or expression was added to a new unified discrimination code which came into force on 1 January 2009.

Since 2002, the Constitution of Sweden has banned discrimination on the grounds of "sexual orientation". Article 12 states:

No act of law or other provision may imply the unfavourable treatment of anyone because they belong to a minority group by reason of ethnic origin, colour, or other similar circumstances or on account of their sexual orientation.

In 2002 the Riksdag also voted to add sexual orientation as a basis for the crime of hate speech, with the law taking effect on 1 January 2003.

Until 2009, the Swedish Ombudsman against Discrimination on Grounds of Sexual Orientation (Ombudsmannen mot diskriminering på grund av sexuell läggning), normally referred to as HomO, was the Swedish office of the ombudsman against discrimination on grounds of sexual orientation. It ceased to exist on 1 January 2009, and was merged with the other ombudsmen against discrimination into a new body: the Discrimination Ombudsman. The previously existing acts against discrimination were also replaced with a new discrimination act.

The term HomO was used both to refer to the office and the title of its government-appointed acting head; the last HomO was Hans Ytterberg. The HomO investigated grievances of individuals and filed class action suits on their behalf, for example a successful action against a restaurant owner in Stockholm who had harassed a lesbian couple. The HomO office was key in taking a number of initiatives of its own and submitting parliamentary proposals, such as the legalisation of same-sex marriage.

On 16 May 2018, the Swedish Parliament added "transgender identity and expression" to the country's hate crime legislation, effective on 1 July 2018. Sexual orientation was added in 2010. The Parliament also voted to add "transgender identity and expression" to the country's hate speech law, effective on 1 January 2019.

Sweden's hate speech law has been criticised for being "selectively applied", as the Swedish authorities refused to prosecute a Halmstad imam who in 2015 called homosexuality a "virus". The move was condemned by the Swedish Federation for Lesbian, Gay, Bisexual and Transgender Rights, which expressed fears that his views might spread to the wider Muslim community in Sweden. Mohamed Omar, a Muslim blogger, claims that homophobia in the Swedish Muslim community is very mainstream. Omar claims that "during my years as a Muslim, I have visited a number of Swedish mosques from north to south. In all, homophobia has been normal. I have heard worse things than "homosexuality is a virus". In no mosque, I repeat [none], have I encountered a teaching that tolerates homosexuality".

However, previous prosecutions against preachers of other religions have also failed, such as in the case of Åke Green, a Pentecostal preacher who was prosecuted for hate speech after a 2003 sermon where he described homosexuality as "a sexual abnormality" and compared it to "a cancer on the body politic". Green was convicted in the district court but acquitted in both the court of appeal and Supreme Court, with the Supreme Court arguing that the protections for religious speech in the European Convention on Human Rights meant that the otherwise illegal hate speech could not be punished as a criminal act.

== Blood donation ==
In the autumn of 2008, the National Board of Health and Welfare proposed that men who have sex with men (MSM) should become eligible to donate blood, but only after a six-month deferral period after sexual intercourse. An earlier proposition in 2006 to allow MSMs to donate blood was rejected. From 1 March 2010, men who have sex with men were supposed to be allowed to donate blood, after one year of abstaining from sex, but the blood banks rejected the law, causing delay until 1 October 2011 at the latest. This allowed them time to adapt to the new regulations. In November 2011, all blood banks in Sweden were instructed to begin accepting donations by gay and bisexual men, provided they haven't had sex in a year. Starting from 1 May 2021 all blood banks in Sweden accept donations from men who have sex with men that haven't had sex in 6 months.

On July 31, 2023, the government asked the National Board of Health and Welfare to evaluate an individualised risk assessment to replace the current criteria for MSM giving blood.

== Public opinion ==
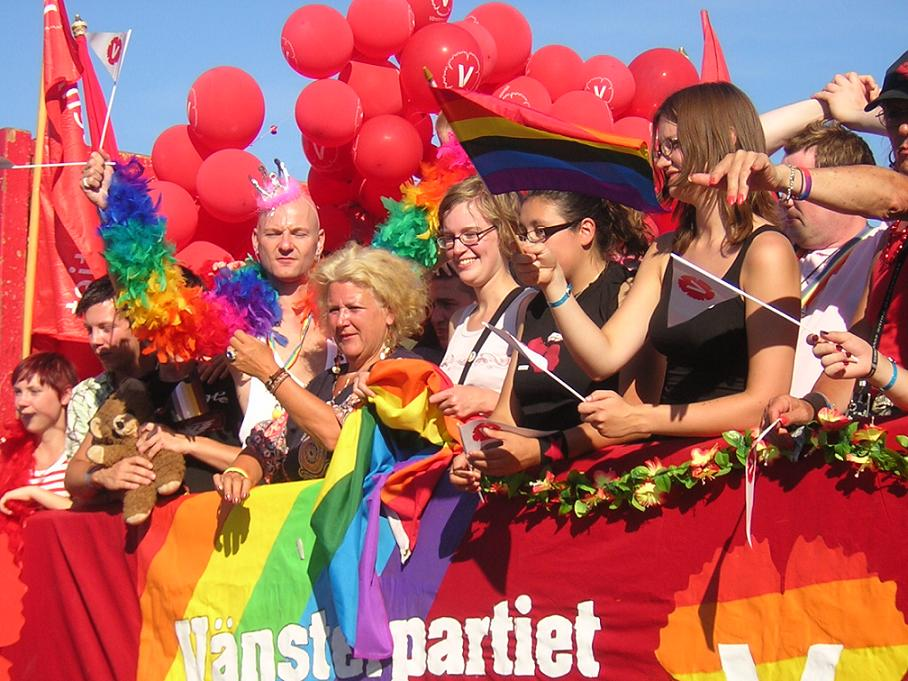
LGBTI Pride in Sweden. Seen in the picture is the Left Party.

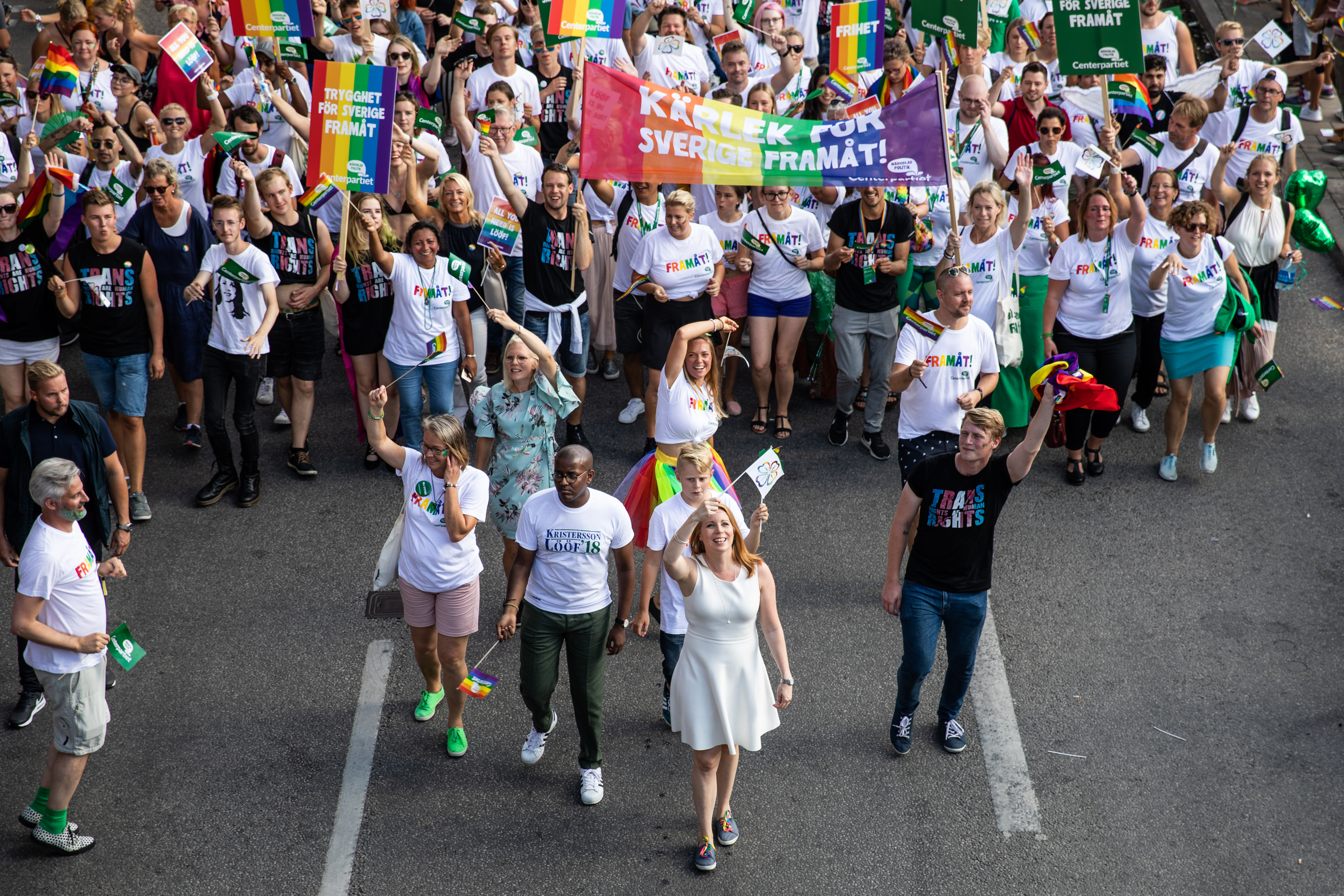
The 2018 edition of Stockholm Pride

According to the International Lesbian, Gay, Bisexual, Trans and Intersex Association (ILGA), Sweden is one of Europe's most gay-friendly countries, with extensive legislation protecting gay and lesbian rights, including anti-discrimination and same-sex marriage legislation. A 2006 European Union member poll showed that 71 per cent of Swedes supported same-sex marriage. The 2015 Eurobarometer found that 90 per cent of Swedes thought that same-sex marriage should be allowed throughout Europe, seven per cent were against.

In May 2015, PlanetRomeo, an LGBTQ social network, published its first Gay Happiness Index (GHI). Gay men from over 120 countries were asked about how they feel about society's view on homosexuality, how do they experience the way they are treated by other people and how satisfied are they with their lives. Sweden was ranked fourth with a GHI score of 73.

The 2019 Eurobarometer showed that 98 per cent of Swedes believed gay and bisexual people should enjoy the same rights as heterosexual people, and 92 per cent supported same-sex marriage.

The 2023 Eurobarometer found that 94% of Swedes people thought same-sex marriage should be allowed throughout Europe, and 95% agreed that "there is nothing wrong in a sexual relationship between two persons of the same sex".

== Anti-gender campaigns ==
Sweden has increasingly seen the influence of domestic anti-gender campaigns, part of a broader transnational movement that opposes gender equality, transgender rights and other LGBTQ rights, and feminist and queer scholarship. These campaigns mobilize around the invented concept of "gender ideology," a term used pejoratively by anti-gender actors to delegitimize academic gender studies and the human rights of LGBTQ people and women. Scholars have documented how Sweden, despite its reputation as a gender-equal country, is increasingly affected by what has been termed "insidious de-democratization," a process in which small but cumulative political and discursive shifts erode liberal democratic norms by marginalizing already vulnerable groups such as trans people, migrants, and racialized minorities.

Anti-gender rhetoric in Sweden is promoted by a range of actors, including the far-right Sweden Democrats and Christian Democrats, who have opposed legal reforms strengthening transgender rights. These parties frame their opposition in terms of protecting women's rights and Swedish values. At the same time, anti-gender views have also gained ground among some radical feminist groups that identify as “gender-critical.” One prominent example is the Swedish Women's Lobby (SWL), which in recent years has been criticized by scholars and civil society groups for adopting trans-exclusionary positions. In 2025, SWL launched the Women's Platform for Action International (WoPAI), an international network promoting "sex-based rights" and opposing what it calls a "pro-gender movement", a "queer agenda" and the concept of gender identity.

Elena Crimaldi noted in 2025 that "Sweden, previously highlighted as a pioneer of feminist and LGBTIQ rights policies, has seen the rise of TERF-aligned groups. The Swedish Women’s Lobby (SWL), established in 1997 as an umbrella organisation uniting 57 associations representing over 130,000 women and girls, now actively opposes the ‘pro-gender movement’. The SWL [...] this year launched the Women's Platform for Action International, a far-right, anti-transgender association promoting ‘sex-based rights’."

Research shows that these anti-gender efforts in Sweden target not only legal rights but also knowledge production, including gender studies and intersectional feminist scholarship, which are often labeled as ideological or unscientific by critics. The opposition frequently draws on arguments about safeguarding "rationality" and "science" and sometimes mirrors narratives associated with international far-right and populist movements.

The increasing normalization of anti-gender discourse has also coincided with growing political violence and intimidation, particularly directed at trans advocates, feminist scholars, and racialized activists. This includes online harassment, threats, and public vilification. Researchers argue that such violence, both symbolic and physical, plays a central role in silencing dissent and undermining democratic participation.

Despite Sweden's formal commitment to gender equality and LGBTQ rights, scholars argue that the adoption of exclusionary rhetoric and policy proposals, especially against trans people and migrants, reflects a deeper shift in how democracy and equality are understood and enacted.

In 2021, 943 priests and employees of the Church of Sweden condemned "trans-exclusionary feminism [that] uses rhetoric we recognize from radical right-wing Christian groups and right-wing populists," adding: "We mourn a rights movement that punches down. You, me, we, all of us, need a broad, solidarity-based feminism that fights restrictive gender norms."

== LGBTQ rights movement in Sweden ==
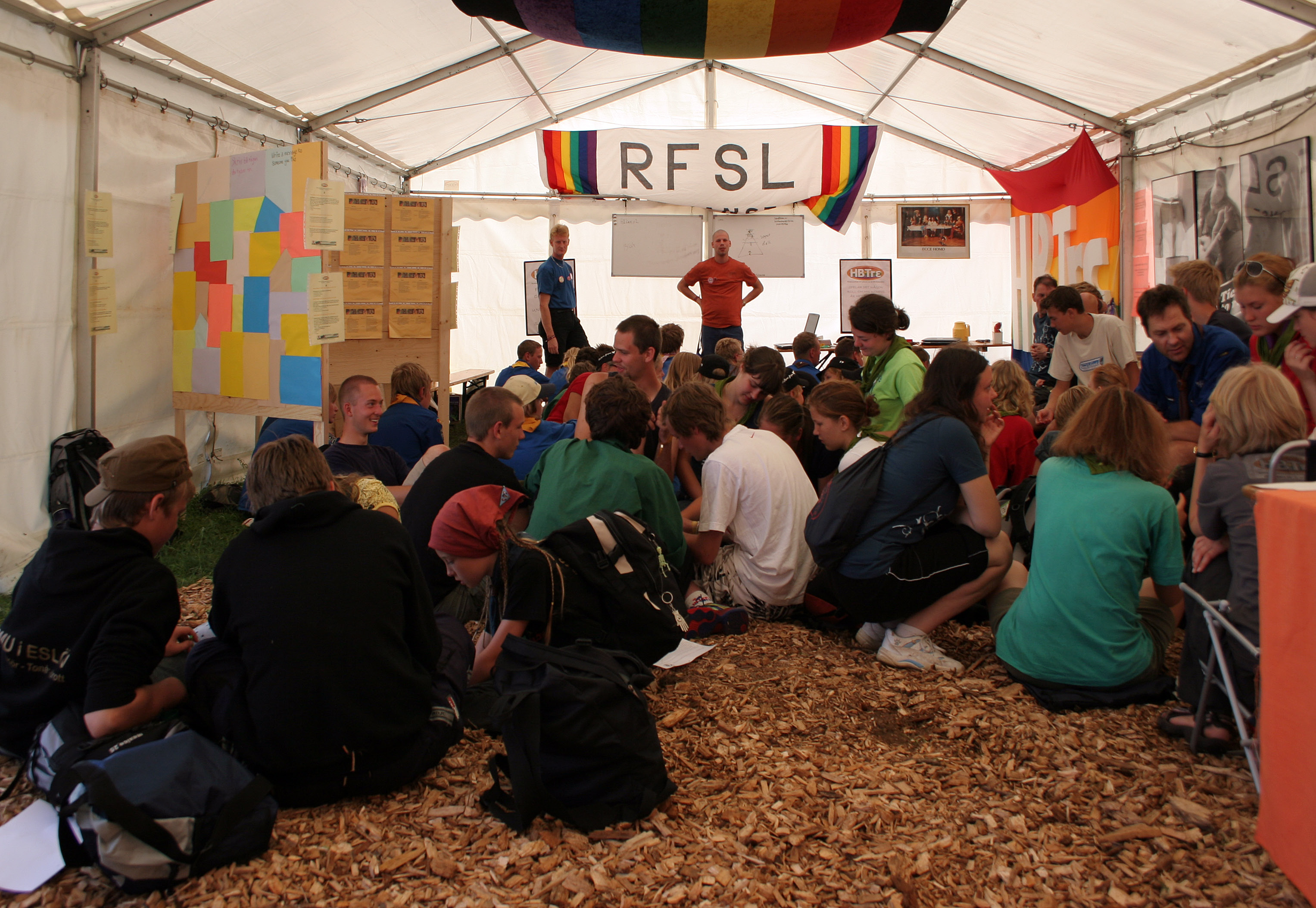
The Swedish Federation for Lesbian, Gay, Bisexual and Transgender Rights (RFSL) holding a seminar in Rinkaby

The Swedish Federation for Lesbian, Gay, Bisexual and Transgender Rights (RFSL; Riksförbundet för homosexuellas, bisexuellas, transpersoners och queeras rättigheter), one of the world's oldest LGBTQ organizations, originated in October 1950 as a Swedish branch of the Danish Federation of 1948. In April 1952, RFSL adopted its current name and declared itself as an independent organization. In 2009, it had 28 branches throughout Sweden, from Piteå in the north to Malmö in the south, with over 6,000 members.

RFSL works for LGBTQ people through political lobbying, the dissemination of information, and the organization of social and support activities. Internationally, RFSL works with the ILGA and also collaborates with other LGBTQ organizations in neighboring countries. The federation operates counseling centers for both women and men in Stockholm, Gothenburg and Malmö. The counseling is intended for people who wish to talk about coming out, sex, HIV/AIDS and other health issues, and relationships, as well as those who need assistance in their contact with the authorities and healthcare institutions, or who require legal assistance with, for example, asylum and wills.

Following the Stonewall riots in New York City in 1969, several more organizations were established in Sweden, including Uppsala Förening för Homosexuella (Uppsala Association for Homosexuals), founded in 1971 in the city of Uppsala, and Gay Power Club from Örebro. The latter organized the first public gay demonstration in Sweden on 15 May 1971, with about fifteen participants. Further demonstrations in Uppsala were held a few weeks later and then in Stockholm on 27 June. There was disagreement within the RFSL in the 1970s, with younger activists advocating a more "radical" movement with public demonstrations, and many feeling the group had failed to address the rights of lesbians and bisexuals. In 1975, several members of the group split to form their own association, the Lesbian Front (Lesbisk Front). LGBTQ groups saw their first political victories during this period; in 1973 the Riksdag stated that "homosexual coexistence is from a social point of view a fully acceptable coexistence", and in 1978 the state appointed an inquiry into the living conditions of gays and lesbians in Sweden. The inquiry suggested a ban on unlawful discrimination, refugee status for perecuted LGBTQ people, constitutional protections for gays and lesbians and a cohabitation law between same-sex couples.

Sweden is frequently referred to as one of the world's most LGBTQ-tolerant and accepting countries, with various organisations and venues catering to LGBTQ people, supportive laws and policies, and high public and societal acceptance. Legislation concerning marriage, anti-discrimination and adoption have all been amended in the past decades to specifically apply to LGBTQ people and same-sex couples. In 2009, Sweden became the seventh country in the world to legalise same-sex marriage, after the Netherlands, Belgium, Spain, Canada, South Africa and Norway. The move was supported by parties across the political spectrum, as well as the Church of Sweden, the former state church (slightly less than two-thirds of Swedes are members). 2015 polling found that Swedes are the second-most supportive of same-sex marriage within the European Union at 90 per cent, behind the Netherlands at 91 per cent. This high societal tolerance has allowed Swedish LGBTQ people to come out, establish various associations, and "enjoy the same rights and obligations as everybody else". In March 2019, Sweden was named the world's best LGBTQ-friendly travel destination, along with Canada and Portugal. Neighbouring Norway, Denmark, Iceland and Finland were all ranked forth. Sweden also hosts several gay pride festivals every year. Stockholm Pride is the biggest and oldest such festival, and has been organized annually since 1998. The event is usually attended by half a million spectators, including about 40,000 who participate in the march itself. In later years, pride festivals have also been arranged in Gothenburg, Malmö and Uppsala, and local pride events are also hosted in smaller communities, including Lund, Örebro, Halmstad, Falun and others. In addition, Sápmi Pride is held in the far north, rotating between Norway, Finland and Sweden every year. It was first held in 2014 in Kiruna. Apart from pride festivities, these cities also host a range of gays clubs, bars, cafés and other venues.

Sexual rights of LGBTQ sub-groups such as migrant LGBTQ are violated to a larger extent than other groups. According to a study conducted in 2021, migrant LGBTQ group have worse sexual health, refrained more from visiting healthcare, were more exposed to sexual violence and more dissatisfied with sexual life.

== Summary table ==
Same-sex sexual activity
Same-sex sexual activity legal	Yes (Since 1944)
Equal age of consent (15)	Yes (Since 1972)
Homosexuality declassified as an illness	Yes (Since 1979)
Discrimination laws
Anti-discrimination laws in employment	Yes
Anti-discrimination laws in science and education	Yes
Anti-discrimination laws in the provision of goods and services	Yes
Anti-discrimination laws in all other areas (incl. indirect discrimination, hate speech)	Yes
The anti-discrimination laws covers: sexual orientation, sex, gender identity and expression	Yes
Hate crime law covering LGBTQI identities	Yes (Since 2010 for sexual orientation and since 2018 for cross-gender identity or expression, intersex is covered through "other similar circumstance")
Same-sex unions
Recognition of same-sex civil unions	Yes (Since 1987 in form of cohabitation unions, gender-neutral since 2003, registered partnerships between 1995 and 2009)
Same-sex marriages	Yes (Since 2009, with gender neutral legislation of marriage, marriage in church the same year)
Parenthood and children
Stepchild adoption by same-sex couples	Yes (In the form of guardianship since 2003, automatic parenthood within civil-unions since 2022)
Joint adoption by same-sex couples	Yes (Since 2003, automatic parenthood within civil-unions since 2022)
Access to IVF for lesbians and automatic parenthood for both spouses after birth	Yes (Since 2005, automatic parenthood within civil-unions since 2022)
Gender-neutral parental legislation	No
More than two legal guardians	No
Altruistic surrogacy for same-sex couples	No (Not permitted within the framework of Swedish healthcare, regardless of sexual orientation or gender)
Military service
LGBTQIA+ people allowed to serve openly in military	Yes (Since 1976)
Trans and intersex rights
Transgender identity declassified as an illness	Yes (Since 2017)
Right to change legal gender	Yes (Since 1972, first country in the world to allow trans people to change legal gender)
Ability to change legal gender without sterilization requirements	Yes (Since 2013)
Ability to change legal gender without a psychiatric/psychological evaluation	Yes (Since 2025)
Ability to change legal gender by self-determination	Yes (Since 2025)
Ability to change legal name no matter legal gender without a psychiatric/psychological evaluation	Yes (Since 2009)
Access to official pardons and compensation/reparations for trans people	Yes (Compensation is available for those affected by the sterilization requirement since 2018)
Intersex minors protected from invasive surgical procedures	No
Access to official pardons and compensation/reparations for intersex people	No
Third gender option	No
Other
MSMs allowed to donate blood	Yes / No (6 month deferral period after all sexual contacts. NAT tests enable equal blood donation and have begun to be introduced in Sweden, by August 2027 these will have been introduced throughout the whole country)
Conversion therapy/conversion attempts banned on minors	Yes (Illegal to try to change someone's sexual orientation or gender identity through threats, coercion or violations, if you break the law, the penalty can be up to four years in prison. The scope of the ban hits repeated vulnerability and includes pseudoscientific therapies, prayers for conversion purposes, and pressure from family or religious leaders. The ban does not include singular attempts, only repeated ones.)
LGBTQIA+ inclusive education in primary school	Yes
Recognition of sexual orientation, sex, gender identity and expression for asylum requests	Yes

== See also ==
- Human rights in Sweden
- LGBTQ history in Sweden
- Politics of Sweden
- LGBTQ rights in Europe
- LGBTQ rights in the European Union
- Timeline of LGBTQ history in Sweden
