= Per Kulling =

Swedish physician (1944–2013)

Per Kulling LKrVA
- Born: 20 March 1944; Västervik Parish, Småland, Sweden
- Died: 29 May 2013 (aged 69); Adolf Fredrik Parish, Stockholm, Sweden
- Education: Karolinska Institute
- Spouse: Marianne Kulling
- Children: 3 daughters

Per-Erik Jacob Kulling (20 March 1944 – 29 May 2013) was a Swedish physician.

== Biography ==
Kulling was raised in Bromma. He was the son of lecturer Jacob Kulling and his wife Märta Kulling. He studied medical science at the Karolinska Institute. After completing his specialized training, he worked as an anaesthetist and intensivist. In 1970, he received his Licentiate of Medicine degree. Between 1982–1999, he was employed at the Swedish Poisons Information Centre. As head physician, he played an important role in its early organisational development. Kulling was also an active member of the Swedish Organising Committee for Disaster Medicine during the same time.

In 1999, he was head of the Emergency Management Unit at the Swedish National Board of Health and Welfare. Kulling made a lot of effort into coordinating the humanitarian response to the 2004 Indian Ocean tsunami. Between 2008–2010, he served as seconded national expert for several institutions and agencies of the European Commission. In 2003, he was elected a member of the Royal Swedish Academy of War Sciences. Kulling is buried in the Northern Cemetery in Stockholm.

== Publications ==
- "Giftgasolyckan i Bhopal den 2–3 december 1984" (1987)
- "Branden i tunnelbanestationen King's Cross den 18 november 1987" (1990)
- "Terroristattacken med sarin i Tokyo den 20 mars 1995" (1998)
- "Har hotbilden förändrats? En tillbakablick på katastrofer under 40 år" (2004)
- "Guidelines for Reports on Health Crises and Critical Health Events" (2010)
- "Medical response to disasters in Sweden" (2000)
