= Beda Hallberg =

Swedish philanthropist (born 1869)

Beda Hallberg (1869–1945) was a Swedish philanthropist. She is known as the founder of the Majblomma Fundraiser Society, for the purpose of benefitting public health, which she founded in Gothenburg in 1907.

She was given the Illis quorum in 1914. She was granted an honorary pension from the Swedish state in 1938. A street in Gothenburg is named after her.
