= Haijby scandal =

Political scandal in Sweden in the 1950s

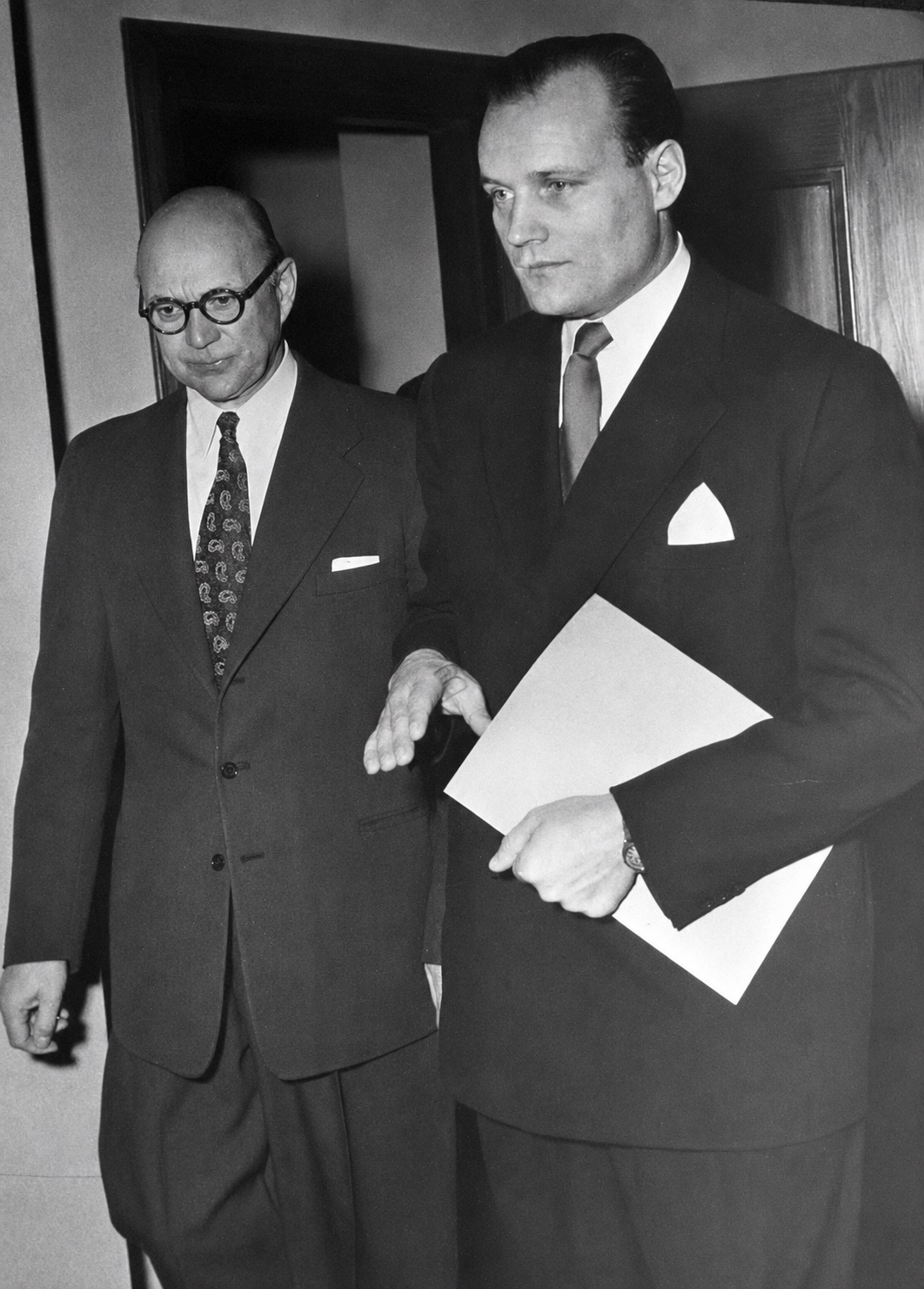
Kurt Haijby (left) and lawyer Henning Sjöström on the way to trial on charges of extortion against the Royal Court.

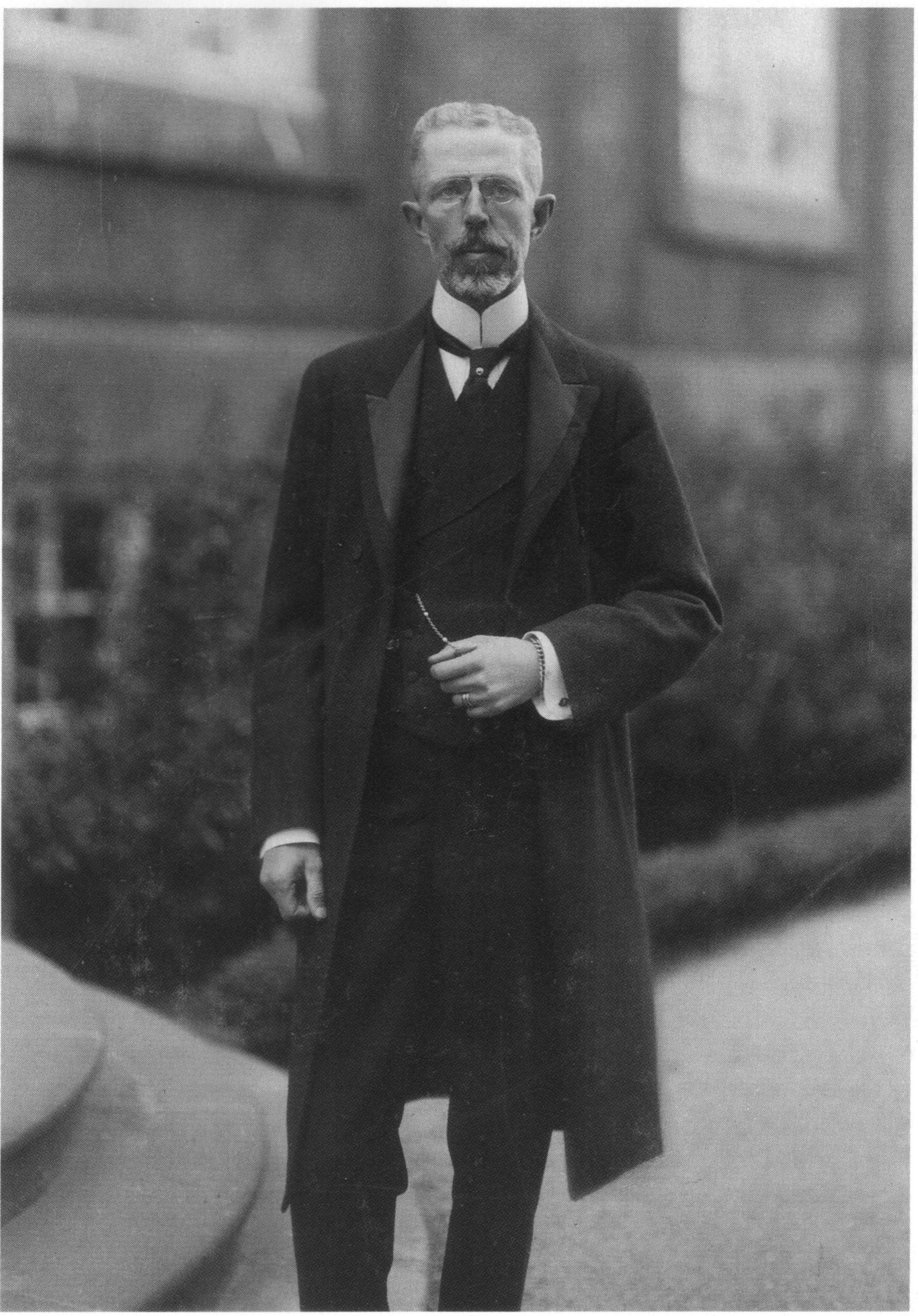
Gustaf V at the time of the First World War

The Haijby scandal (Haijbyaffären) was a political affair in Sweden in the 1950s, involving the conviction and imprisonment of restaurateur Kurt Haijby for the supposed blackmail of King Gustaf V. Haijby claimed that he had a secret homosexual relationship with the King in the 1930s.

== Background ==
Kurt Haijby was born in Stockholm in 1897 as Kurt Johansson, and died there in 1965. His father was a wine merchant and a fishmonger by appointment to the Royal Court. In 1912, while selling "majblomma" charity pins, Kurt and another boy scout were granted an audience with King Gustaf V of Sweden.

Johansson later worked as a waiter, clerk, actor, and illusionist. He was convicted to hard labour six times for several cases of theft and fraud between 1915 and 1925. While trying to escape prison in 1923 he fatally shot a police officer, being convicted of manslaughter after successfully convincing the court he was about to commit suicide and hit the policeman by accident. Once released, Johansson changed his name to Haijby and spent a nomadic life in France and the United States.

In 1931, Haijby opened a restaurant with his second wife Anna, a widow ten years his senior. Being a convicted criminal, he could not acquire a license needed to sell wine and liquor, which severely set back his business. He applied to the King - an archaic possibility stemming from now-defunct royal absolutism, but a legal possibility of last appeal (akin to an appeal to the privy council in the Commonwealth) - and was granted an audience in 1933 to put forward his case. During this royal audience, King Gustav V, a 75-year-old widower, allegedly seduced Haijby.

Haijby's wife, on learning about the recurrent meetings in 1936, filed for divorce, citing her husband's homosexual relationship with the King as cause for divorce. Fearing the allegations would become public knowledge, officials of the Royal Court convinced the couple to settle for an amicable no-fault divorce and separation by paying Anna Haijby 15,000 kronor. Despite their legal separation, the couple continued to live together until her death. According to a report, the King said to his Court Superintendent: "There must not be a scandal, but do it with as little money as possible".

Haijby was given 1,500 kronor by the Royal Court lawyers and encouraged to emigrate to the United States, where he was promised an additional 3,000 kronor to start a new life. Haijby claimed that, upon arrival in the US, there was no money for him. He eventually returned to Sweden where he once again asked for support from the Royal Court.

For several years, money from the Court financed a number of Haijby's failed enterprises, including a coffee store and a boarding house at the Trystorp estate. There is no evidence of outright blackmail on Haijby's part, but it can be argued that the Court was attempting to buy his silence. In all, Haijby received 170,000 Swedish kronor (equivalent to 4,700,000 kronor in 2009) from the Court and perhaps much more from the King's private funds.

Haijby would ultimately claim that he was King Gustaf's lover in the years between 1936 and 1947.

In 1938 Haijby was arrested for child sexual abuse of an 11-year old and a 13-year-old boy and put in custody at the asylum of Beckomberga. This was the result of political pressure from the Governor of Stockholm, Torsten Nothin. The psychiatrist in charge of the asylum did not believe that Haijby was in need of psychiatric care and he was eventually discharged. The child abuse case was never brought to a criminal court.

In 1939, a new deal was arranged in which Haijby was forced to emigrate to Germany, then under rule by the Nazis, who engaged in intense suppression of homosexual conduct. After a short while in Berlin, he was put in prison by the Gestapo, probably by request of the Swedish Court, officially after molesting a hotel bellboy. Unlike most Gestapo prisoners, Haijby was not tortured and, most of the time, kept in decent conditions. Charges were then brought against him for sexual relations with two young boys under Paragraph 175, and he was sentenced to prison and banished to Sweden in 1940, having served his sentence.

Once reunited with his ex-wife, who gave him a grant using a police officer as a middleman, Haijby was made to believe that the money came from the Court. Haijby was, allegedly because of pressure from the court, committed to an asylum in 1941.

In the meantime, another scandal, the Kejne affair, had broken in the press where celebrity author and journalist Vilhelm Moberg wrote lengthy articles about homosexual conspiracies among Swedish officials.

In 1947, Haijby used his own money to publish a roman à clef, detailing his ostensible relationship with the King. Half of the first printing of 1,000 copies was bought by the Chief Constable, funded by the Royal Court. Haijby's ex-wife Anna bought the remainder.

== The scandal ==
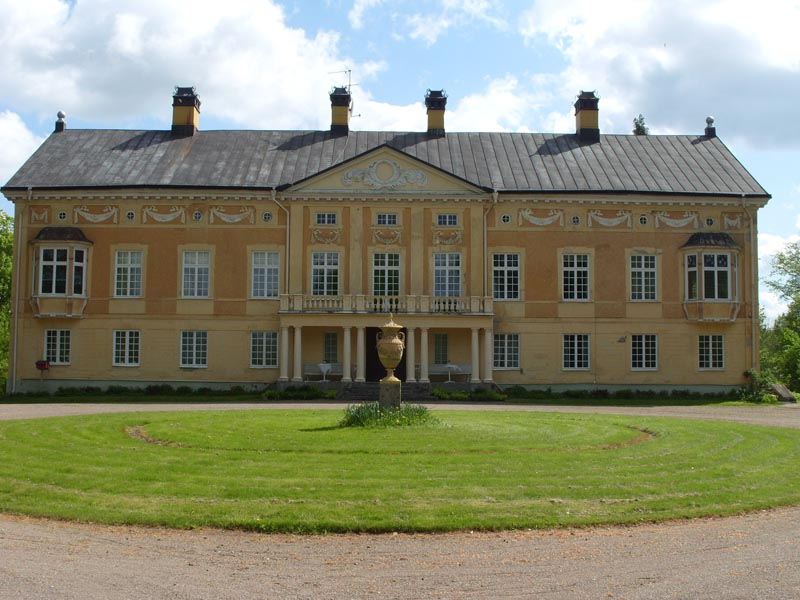
Trystorp, Kurt Haijby's boarding-house

Haijby reported his forced detention in the asylum at Beckomberga to the Attorney General of Sweden. These papers were immediately classified but were smuggled out of the Attorney General's office by Vilhelm Moberg, and the whole affair thus came to public attention. The actions of officials to suppress the claims caused acrimonious debate in parliament and the media. As a consequence, the criminal court charged Haijby for acts of blackmail.

In 1952, after a dubiously held trial, Haijby was sentenced to eight years of hard labour for blackmail under aggravated circumstances, which in 1953 was reduced to six years by the Svea Court of Appeal.

After the death of King Gustav V in 1950, the confiscated roman à clef was re-distributed in 1952 and was reprinted in 1979.

Haijby had reported the treatment he had received to the Swedish Chancellor of Justice. The results of the investigations, the bulk of which were classified until 2002, effectively acquitted the monarchy. There is nothing to support the claim that Haijby was seduced by the King as a 14-year-old boy, but most commentators believe that he had a sexual relationship with the King in the 1930s. Haijby committed suicide in 1965, one year after the death of Anna Haijby.

However, the fact that the Swedish Court was prepared to pay Haijby such large sums to suppress his accusations has by some been taken as evidence that they were true. Later, several servants at the Royal Court, among them a male servant and chauffeurs, claimed that they were given money to keep quiet concerning their own intimate contacts with the King.
