= West Pride =

LGBTQ cultural festival in Sweden

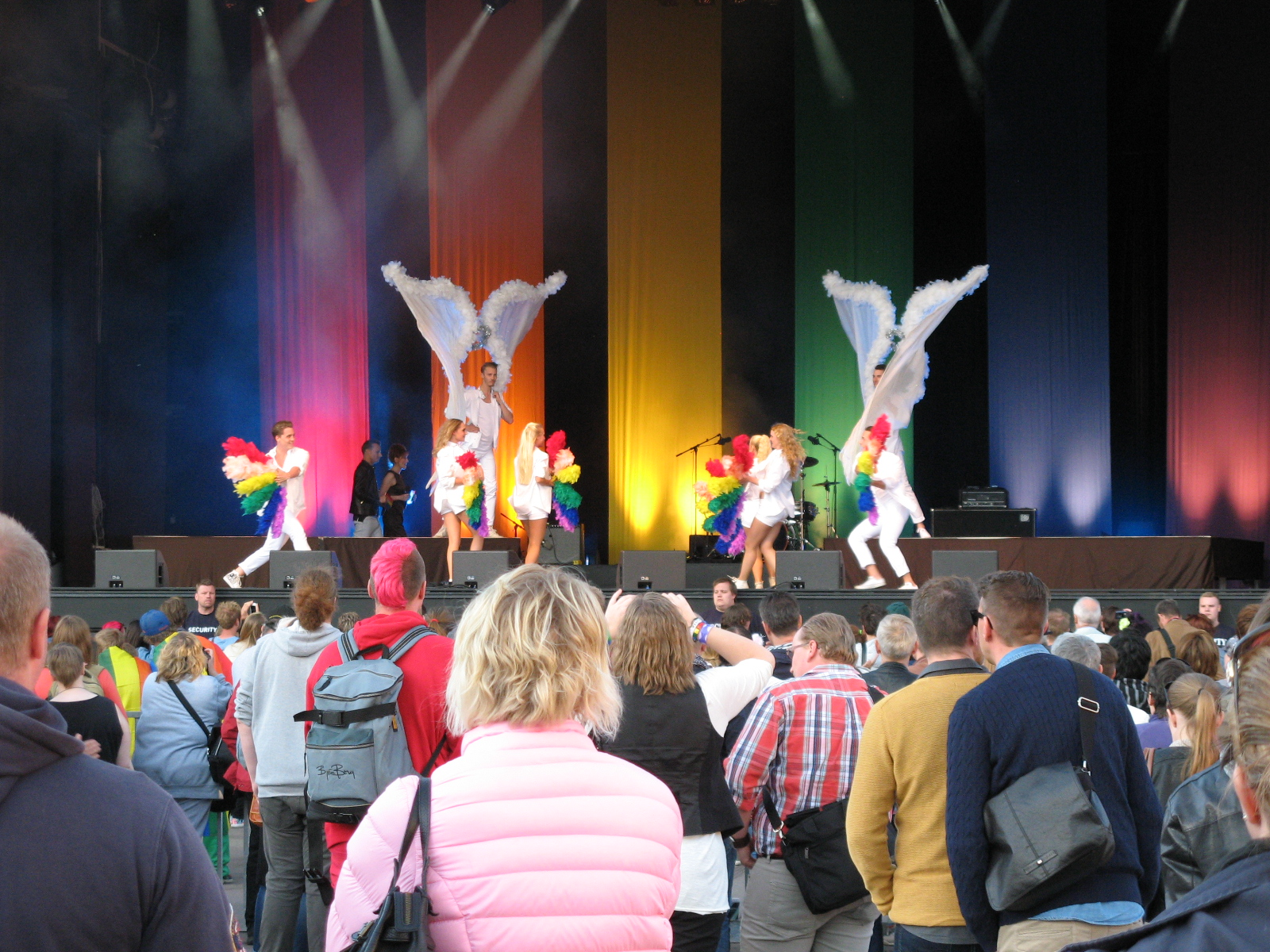
Liseberg, West Pride

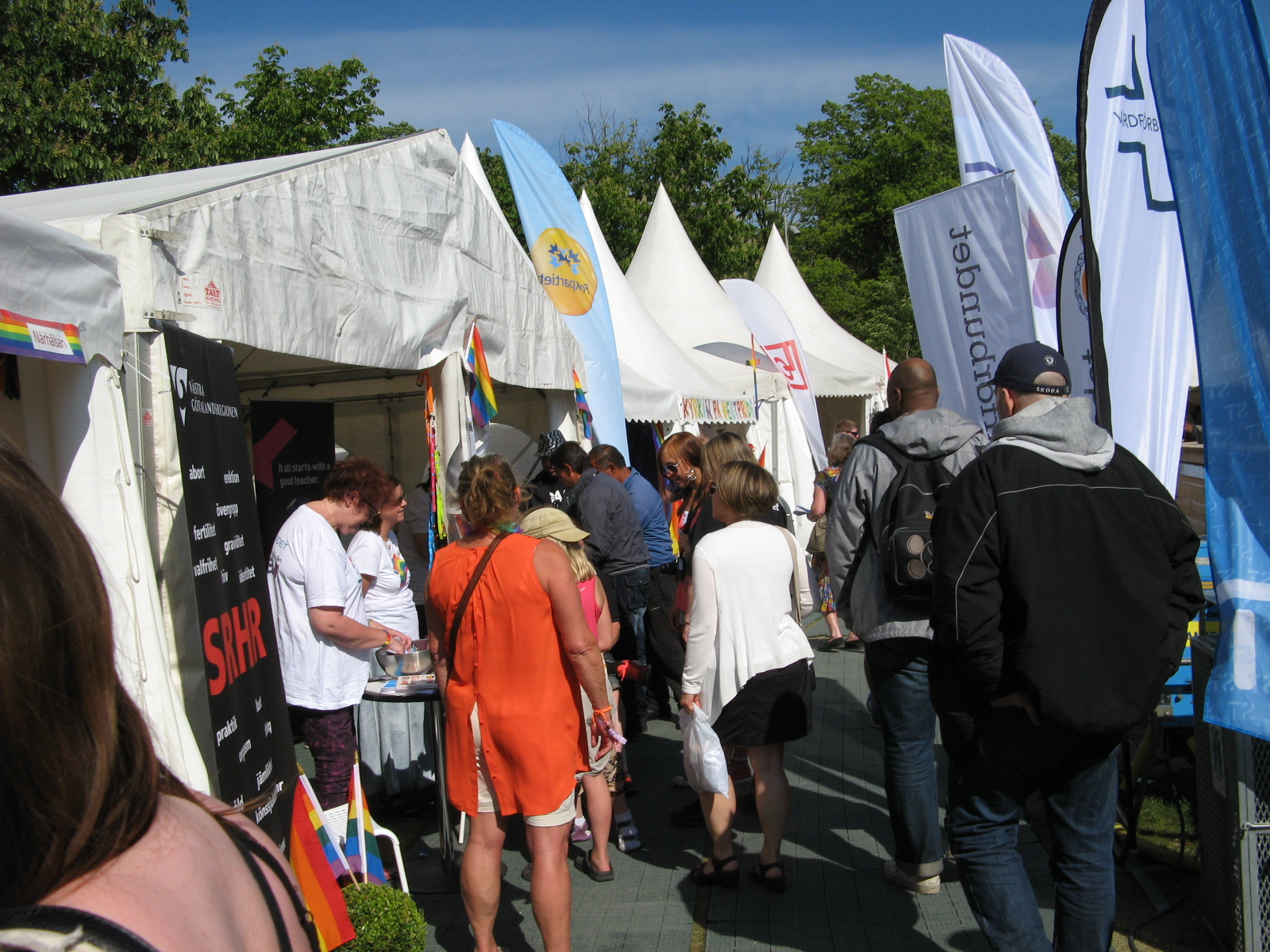
Pride Park, West Pride 2014

West Pride is a gay, lesbian, bisexual and transgender cultural festival in Gothenburg, Sweden. It is Sweden's second-largest Pride festival, after Stockholm Pride, drawing more than 125,000 participants each year.

The annual event, now held every June, was original hosted by the Gothenburg Municipality and Västra Götaland region, in cooperation with RFSL and other LGBTQ+ and cultural organisations. West Pride is now put on by an independent non-profit organization that was created in 2008.

The event takes place at the city's foremost cultural institutions such as Gothenburg City Theatre, the Röhsska Museum and the Museum of World Culture. Gothenburg Film Festival shows queer films during the festival.

West Pride also works year-round to address issues of LGBTQ+ discrimination by offering educational programs in schools and workplaces across the Västra Götaland region.

== History ==
West Pride was held for the first time in 2007 with the vision of "creating an equal world free from prejudice and discrimination," according to the organization's website. The original name of the event was LGBT-GBG. The event was established through a partnership between the Gothenburg City Theatre, the Blue House, Pustervik and the World Cultural Museum. The festival was held every year from 2007 to 2020.

- In 2008, due to the festival's success, a festival association was created called LGBT-Festivalen.
- In 2010, the festival included its first "Rainbow Parade".
- In 2011, the event's name was changed to LGBTQ Festival (HBTQ-festivalen) to be more inclusive. In 2013, the event was rebranded again to West Pride.
- In 2017, the city supported the event by displaying 1,000 rainbow flags. Parade participants in 2017 carried signs urging acceptance of refugees and immigrants, and urging other European and Middle Eastern countries to accept LGBTQ people. 2017 also marked the creation of the Kaj Heino prize in memory of a leading refugee, human rights and anti-discrimination activist.
- In 2018, West Pride became the host of EuroPride with performances by Boy George and Culture Club, Silvana Imam and Robert Fux.
- In 2020, West Pride was cancelled due to the COVID-19 pandemic.
- In 2021, West Pride was held again following the relaxation of pandemic restrictions.
- In 2022, West Pride launched an advertising campaign to highlight the experiences of LGBTQ+ refugees.

== See also ==
- List of LGBT film festivals
