= Barbro Westerholm =

Swedish politician (1933–2023)

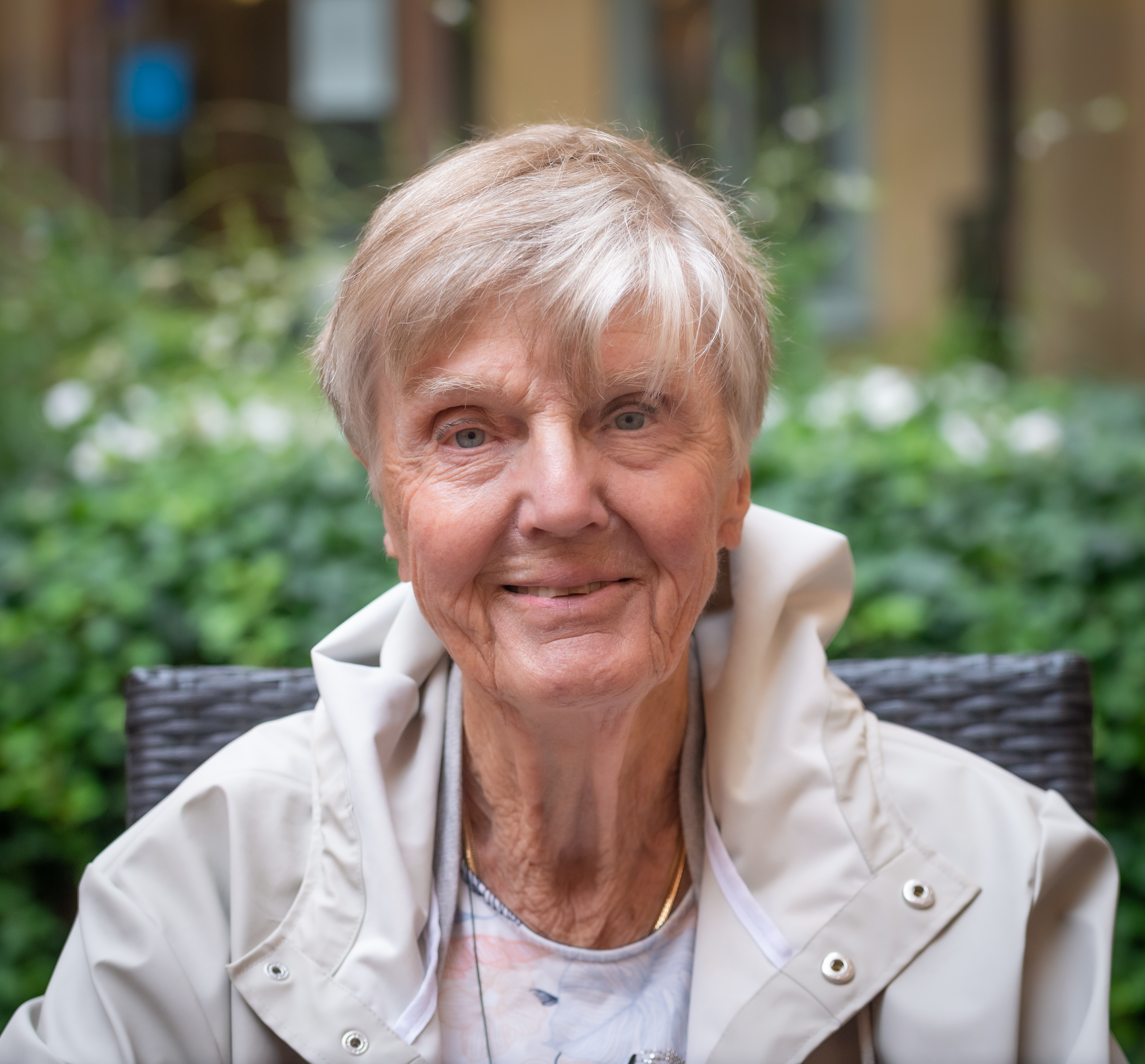
- Westerholm in 2021

Member of the Riksdag
- In office 2 October 2006 – 26 September 2022
- Constituency: Stockholm County
- In office 3 October 1988 – 1 October 1999
- Constituency: Stockholm County

Chairman of the Swedish Pensioners' Association
- In office 1999–2005
- Preceded by: Gunnel Jonäng

Director-General of the National Board of Health and Welfare
- In office 1979–1985
- Preceded by: Bror Rexed
- Succeeded by: Maj-Britt Sandlund

Personal details
- Born: 16 June 1933 Stockholm, Sweden
- Died: 13 March 2023 (aged 89) Stockholm, Sweden
- Party: Liberals

Barbro Westerholm (16 June 1933 – 13 March 2023) was a Swedish politician of the Liberals. She was member of parliament (Riksdag) from 1988 to 1999 and again from 2006 to 2022. She was the chair of the Liberal women in 1988–1997.

From the mid-1960s Westerholm was an early pioneer in the field of pharmacovigilance, also working on the early stages of the WHO Drug Dictionary and the WHO Programme for International Drug Monitoring. In 1979 as general director of the Swedish National Board of Health and Welfare, she had homosexuality dropped from the list of mental health diseases.

Westerholm was a critic of ageism and advocated for the measurement and publicizing of data on the economic value of volunteer work, and in particular the contributions of older people. In 2009 she was awarded the Nordic Public Health Prize for her work in fighting discrimination against the elderly. She was awarded the Illis quorum by the government of Sweden in 2003.

Westerholm died on 13 March 2023, at the age of 89.
