= Lars Wallin =

Swedish fashion designer (born 1965)

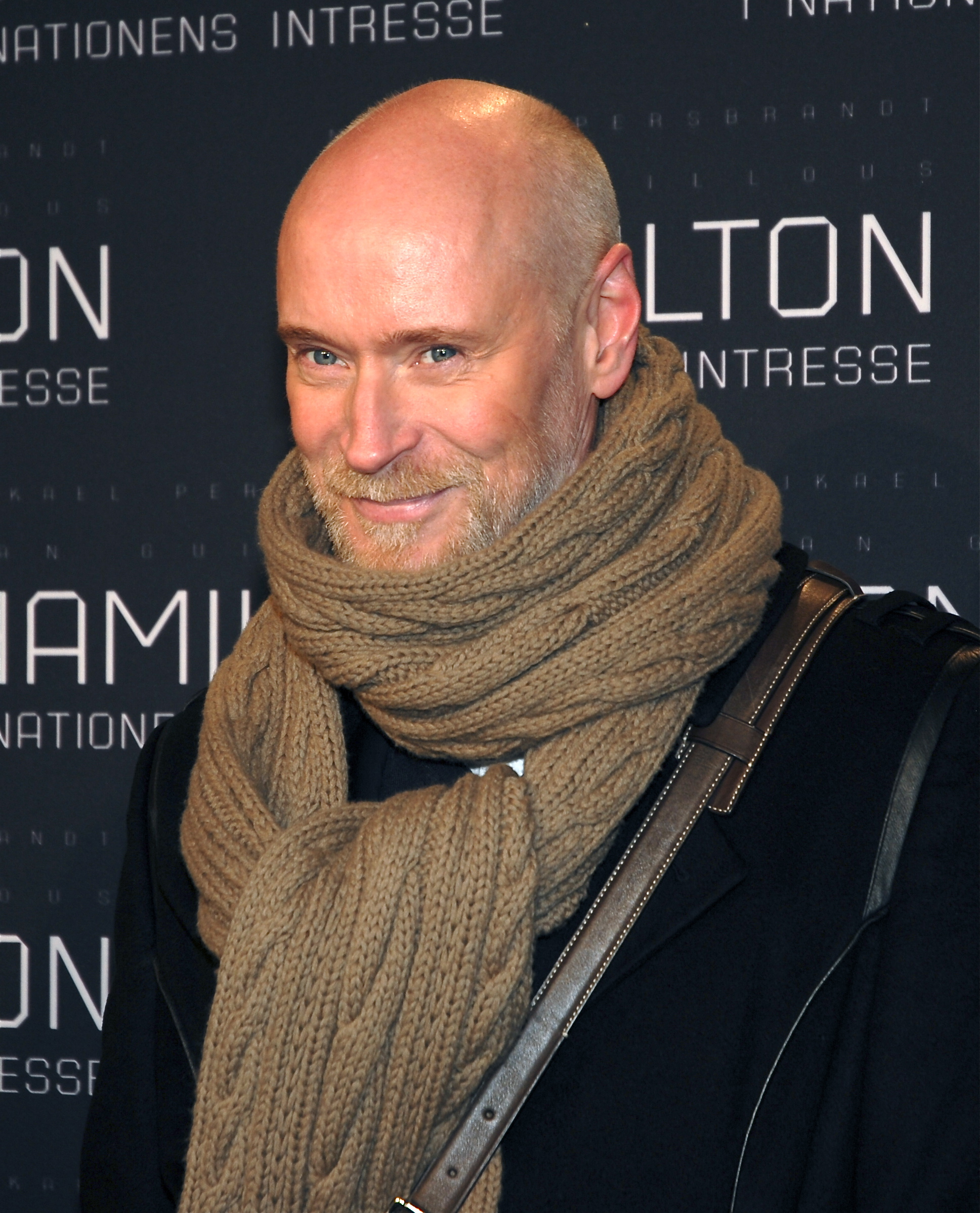
Lars Wallin in 2012

Lars Wallin (born 1965) is a Swedish fashion designer.

== Career ==
He made his debut on the Swedish fashion stage in 1990 after graduating from Beckmans. Since then he has received many prestigious assignments, designing for Miss World and the Eurovision Song Contest. He is also known for designing dresses for Crown Princess Victoria.

Wallin designed the clothes Carola Häggkvist wore when she won Melodifestivalen in 2006 and he designed new ones for her appearance at the Eurovision Song Contest in Athens.

Lars has also created his own jewelry brand.

== Honours ==
- (Sweden) H. M. The King's Medal, 8th size, worn on a blue ribbon (6 June 2026)
