= Ombudsman against Discrimination on Grounds of Sexual Orientation (Sweden) =

Swedish anti-discrimination agency

The Ombudsman against Discrimination on Grounds of Sexual Orientation (Swedish: Ombudsmannen mot diskriminering på grund av sexuell läggning), abbreviated HomO, was the Swedish office of the ombudsman against discrimination on grounds of sexual orientation. On 1 January 2009, it was merged with other ombudsman officers into the new Equality Ombudsman (Diskrimineringsombudsmannen).

HomO was the most recently instituted Swedish ombudsman, in the sense of a government official who addresses the complaints of individual citizens. HomO had the status of a government agency. In 2005 it received around 8 million SEK in government funding.

The term HomO is used both to refer to the office and as the title of its government-appointed acting head. HomO was the officially mandated short form, but is not a true acronym or abbreviation. Instead the word alludes to both "homo" (homosexual) and to traditional Swedish ombudsman abbreviations which do expand into descriptive terms, such as JämO = Jämställdhetsombudsmannen.

In addition to this government office, the merger that created the Equality Ombudsman office involved the earlier offices of Equality Ombudsman, Ombudsman against Ethnic Discrimination and Disability Ombudsman.

== See also ==
- LGBT rights in Sweden
- List of LGBT rights organisations
- Swedish Federation for Lesbian, Gay, Bisexual and Transgender Rights, RFSL
