= Majblomma =

Swedish charity fundraiser

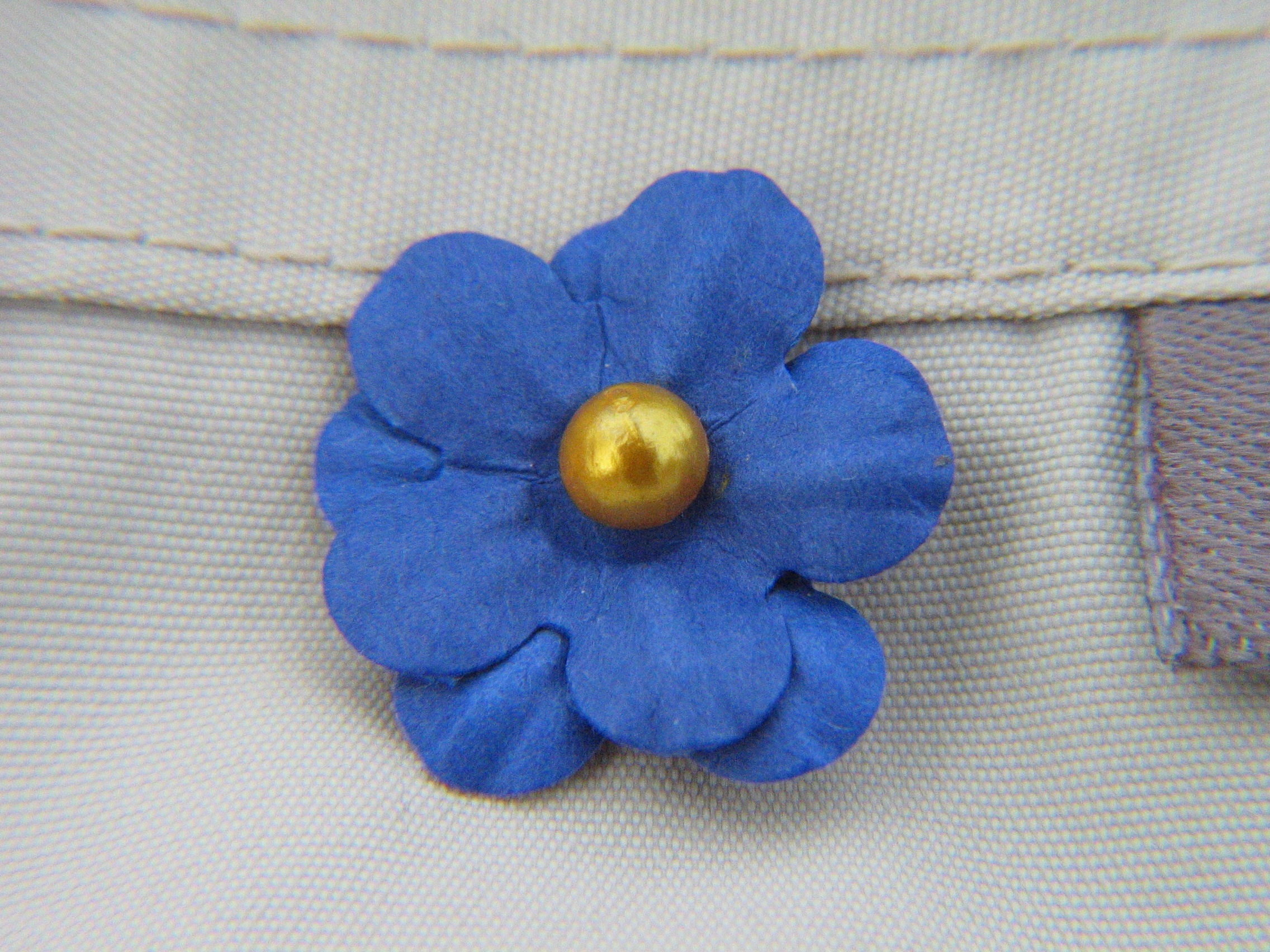
The majblomma colour scheme from 2007

The majblomma (definite form: majblomman; Swedish for 'mayflower') is a paper flower pin sold by schoolchildren in Sweden to raise funds for charity. The mayflower fundraiser was started in Onsala by Beda Hallberg in 1907, and has taken place in April and May every year since.

The flower pin design has four parts; two groups of five-leaved paper petals (often a small paper disc) and a metal pin, in a different colour combination each year.

== History ==
Beda Hallberg was an active member of Gothenburg's charity movement, and had the idea of selling majblomma pins to raise funds for tuberculosis research. Born in 1869 in Onsala, Hallberg was the youngest daughter of a captain and a farmer's daughter. Her father left the family in 1870 to emigrate to the US. She is thought to have married a tobacco dealer in 1888 and got involved with Gothenburg charity work in 1890.

After seeing her daughter with a Gustavus Adolphus Day paper badge, Hallberg founded a committee including Frigga Carlberg, a feminist social worker and writer, as well as the municipal physician (stadsläkare) K. J. Gezelius. Despite others doubting her idea, she ordered 100,000 blue-coloured paper flower pins and decided to sell them for 10 öre each (equivalent to SEK6.46 in 2023), an affordable price for most.

Her campaign became a tremendous success. Around 139,000 pins were sold on 1 May 1907 in Gothenburg – exceeding even Hallberg's expectations.

The local newspaper Göteborgs Handels- och Sjöfartstidning wrote:

The blue flower has won. The whole city celebrates it. You see it everywhere, wherever you come, on lapels and coats, scarves and shawls. Businessmen, civil servants, workers, old men and children, tram conductors, police officers, kayakers, drivers – they all carry the flower and feel that everyone is happy to be involved. It is the ideal of ideas: simple, enthusiastic and poignant.

=== Colours throughout the years ===
The colours of the majblomma vary each year. During the early years, the shape could also vary somewhat.

1918

1919

1920

1926

1927

1928

1929

1930

1931

1932

1933

1934

1935

1936

1937

1938

1939

1940

1941

1942

1943

1944

1945

1946

1947

1948

1949

1950

1951

1952

1953

1954

1955

1956

1957

1958

1959

1960

1961

1962

1963

1964

1965

1966

1967

1968

1969

1970

1971

1972

1973

1974

1975

1976

1977

1978

1979

1980

1981

1982

1983

1984

1985

1986

1987

1988

1989

1990

1991

1992

1993

1994

1995

1996

1997

1998

1999

2000

2001

2002

2003

2004

2005

2006

2007

2008

2009

2010

2011

2012

2013

2014

2015

2016

2017

2018

2019

2020

2021

2022

2023

2024

2025

2026

== Outside of Sweden ==
Following the initial success in Sweden, similar mayflower fund raising took place in Finland (1908), Norway and Denmark (1909), The Netherlands and Belgium (1910), Russia, Germany, Austria, Switzerland, Italy, and France (1911), Britain and Estonia (1912), Algeria (1913), Cuba (1916), the United States (1922), and India (1932). However, as tuberculosis rates in Europe declined, most international charities eventually disbanded, and now only remain in Sweden, Finland, Norway, and Estonia (today with different missions).

== See also ==
- Remembrance poppy, used in fundraising for veterans
