= Kejne affair =

1950s political scandal in Sweden

The Kejne affair was a political affair in Sweden in the 1950s.

In 1948, Karl-Erik Kejne (1913–60), a Swedish Lutheran pastor, publicly accused groups of gay men of threatening him and making attempts on his life. This occurred after he had tried to put an end to gay prostitution in Stockholm, Sweden. In March 1950, Kejne published a sensationalist article in the newspaper Dagens Nyheter claiming that the prostitution of underage boys was rampant in the working class districts of Stockholm, being patronised by wealthy and well connected gay men whom the police did not dare arrest.

This theme was quickly picked up by several evening papers, and reached the proportions of a witch-hunt. There was widespread belief in Kejne's conspiracy theory about a "homosexual mafia", supposedly controlling several criminal gangs of gay men. When a commission was appointed to examine Kejne's allegations, he accused the commission of being infiltrated by the same "homosexual mafia", leading to a new commission, presumably made of straight men, to investigate the first commission.

Kejne accused the attorney of corruption, specifically by order of Cabinet minister Nils Quensel. Kejne claimed that Quensel was involved in the groups himself. Kejne also claimed that Quensel ordered the police to send infiltrators posing as gay men to his house, in order to prove that Kejne was himself gay. Homosexuality had been decriminalized in Sweden in 1944.

A commission was formed to address these issues. In 1951, when they could not clear Quensel of all charges, he chose to resign as a Cabinet minister.

The author Vilhelm Moberg wrote at length about the Kejne affair, and also brought the Haijby affair to public knowledge.
