= Kent Carlsson (politician) =

Swedish politician (1962–1993)

Member of the Swedish Parliament for Stockholm municipal constituency
- In office 1991–1993
- Prime Minister: Carl Bildt

Personal details
- Born: 18 June 1962 Stockholm, Stockholm County, Sweden
- Died: 7 November 1993 (aged 31) Stockholm, Stockholm County, Sweden
- Party: Swedish Social Democratic Party

Kent Carlsson (1962–1993) was a Swedish Social Democratic Party politician. He was a member of the Riksdag for the Stockholm municipal constituency from 1991 until his death in 1993. Carlsson was the first ever openly gay representative in the Swedish Riksdag.
