= National Board of Health and Welfare (Sweden) =

Government agency in Sweden under the Ministry of Health and Social Affairs

- Swedish National Board of Health and Welfare

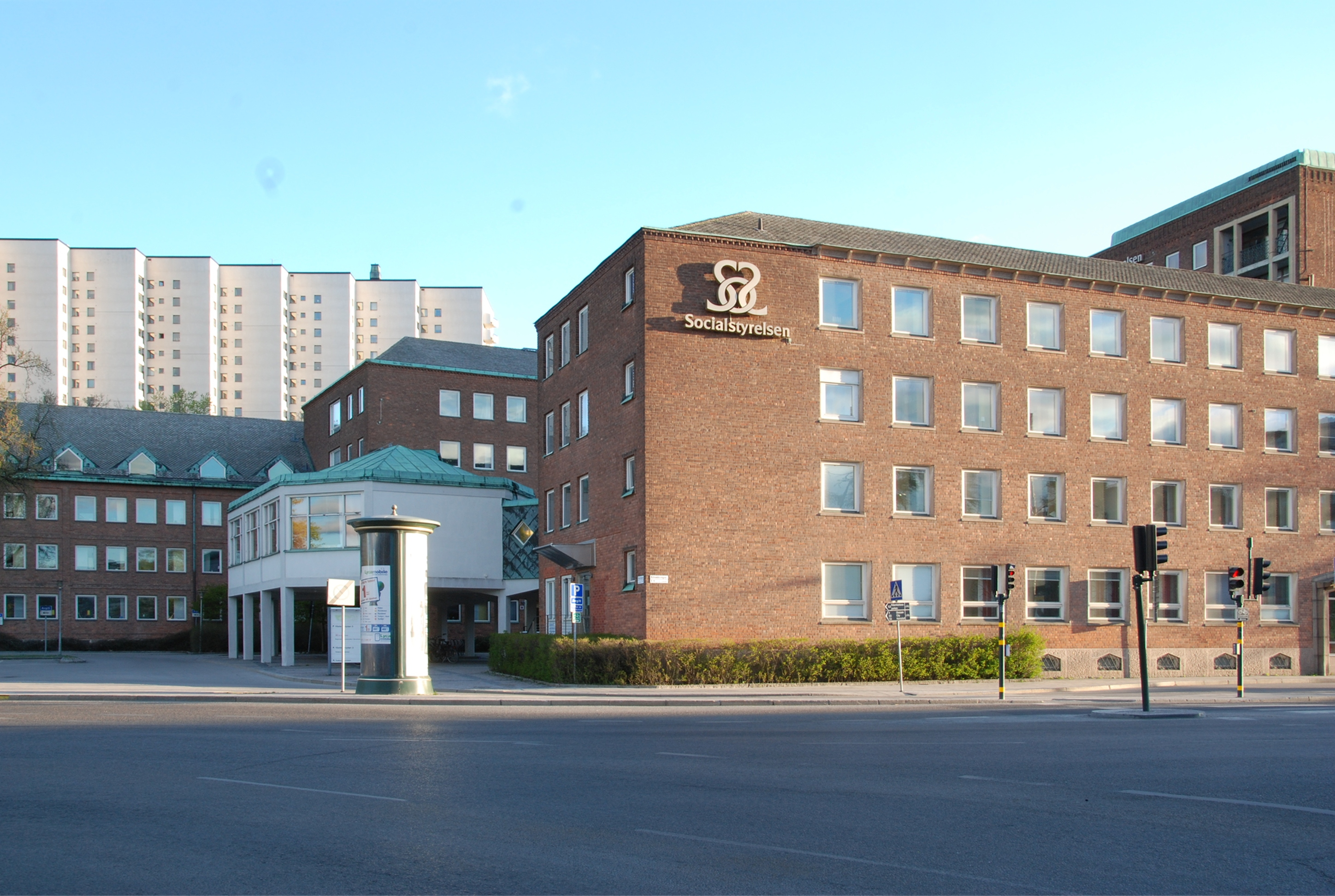

Agency overview
- Formed: 1968
- Jurisdiction: Government of Sweden
- Headquarters: Rålambsvägen 3, 112 59 Stockholm; 59.327928°N 18.020893°E
- Agency executive: Björn Eriksson, Director general
- Parent agency: Ministry of Health and Social Affairs
- Website: Official website

The Swedish National Board of Health and Welfare (Swedish: Socialstyrelsen) is a Swedish government agency. The agency was the result of a merger between the National Swedish Board of Health and the Swedish Royal Board of Social Affairs in 1968. As of 2025, it is headed by director-general Björn Eriksson.

The Board is the central national authority for social services and health services. The Board establishes norms by issuing provisions and general advice. It evaluates legislation and activities conducted by municipalities, county councils and local authorities. It also issues certificates of registration to 22 professional groups. Another responsibility are the official national statistics in the social services, medical care, and health and disease. (Note: "IN STATS: The leading causes of death in Sweden last year". The Local. 2018-10-25.)

== Swedish Coronary Angiography and Angioplasty Register ==
The Swedish Coronary Angiography and Angioplasty Register (SCAAR) is a national registry sponsored by the National Board of Health and Welfare that contains relevant medical data on consecutive patients from 29 hospitals in Sweden at which coronary angiography and percutaneous coronary interventions (PCI) are performed.

The registry was established in 1989. It is independent of funding from industry. The data technology was developed by, and is administered by the Uppsala Clinical Research Center. Since 2001, SCAAR has been Internet-based, with recording of data online through a Web interface. Data are transferred in an encrypted format to a central server at the Uppsala Clinical Research Center. All consecutive patients undergoing coronary angiography or PCI in Sweden are registered in this database which provides a unique opportunity for prospective observational studies within the field of interventional cardiology.
