= Magnus Körner =

Swedish artist and scientific illustrator (1808–1864)

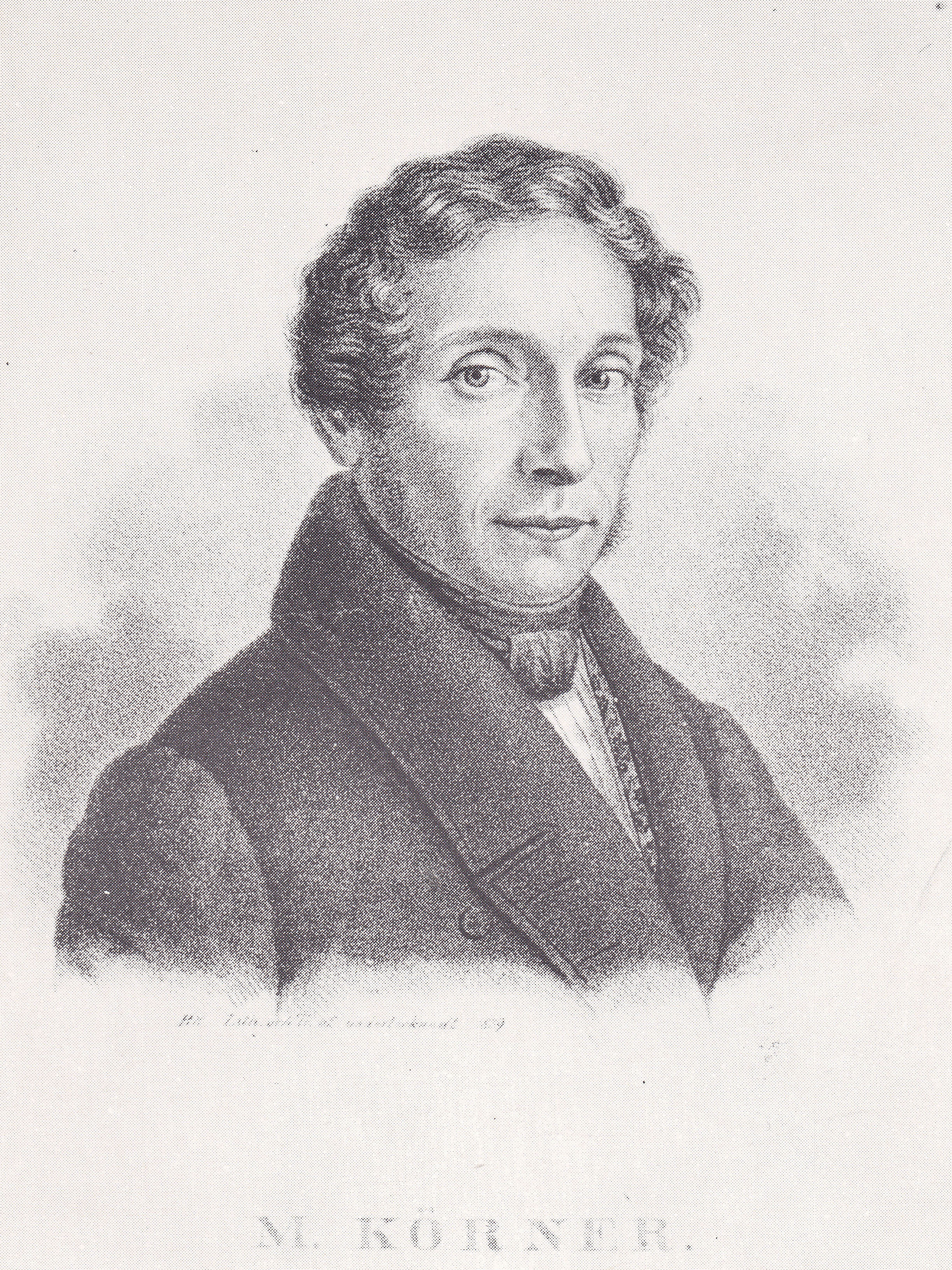
Magnus Körner

Magnus Körner (12 December 1808 – 4 November 1864) was a Swedish artist and scientific illustrator. Born in Gårdstånga in the province of Scania, Körner developed an interest in wildlife and drawing early in life, and was sent to Lund to study drawing and art at the age of fifteen. In 1829 he was hired by Sven Nilsson, professor of Natural History at Lund University, to provide illustrations for an ambitious new illustrated description of the fauna of Scandinavia. The work was published between 1829 and 1840 and Körner provided almost all of its illustrations. Körner also on his own initiative published cheaper illustrated works on birds and mammals. He introduced the method of lithography to Lund and illustrated many other works as well, or printed the illustrations of others. His output includes stand-alone prints, portraits and illustrations for books and magazines on anatomy, botany, pomology, entomology, archaeology, hippology and topography. In 1849 Körner was appointed as the official draughtsman of Lund University. He was also one of the first daguerreotypists in Sweden.

== Early life ==
Magnus Körner was born in Gårdstånga in the province of Scania in southernmost Sweden in 1808. His father held a position equivalent to that of a superintendent or inspector at the nearby Viderup Castle. The family was not poor. Körner received basic education from a private tutor at the castle, together with the children of the owners of the estate. He also spent much of his childhood tending the animals of the estate while they were grazing. He enjoyed being out of doors, started birdwatching and was encouraged by his father to learn more about the local flora. Körner's fascination for nature was discovered by the owner of the neighbouring estate, Svenstorp Castle, Baron Axel Gustaf Gyllenkrok. Gyllenkrok shared the boy's interest in zoology and allowed Körner to access his private collection, encouraged him to study, and supplied him with funds so he could buy drawing utensils. They developed a lifelong friendship. Through Gyllenkrok, Körner gained access to the art collections of other members of the Swedish nobility in the province; at the age of 12 he thus for example had the opportunity to make a copy of an Ecce Homo by Guido Reni in Kulla Gunnarstorp Castle.

At the age of fifteen, Körner was sent to Lund to study drawing and art under the tutelage of Anders Arvidsson, an artist and art teacher. He was praised for his progress and also became an acquaintance of other young artists, including Gustaf Wilhelm Palm and Johan Holmbergsson. In May 1829, Arvidsson was hired by Sven Nilsson, professor of Natural History at Lund University, to provide five young artists to make illustrations for his ambitious new multi-volume work, an illustrated description of the fauna of Scandinavia with the Swedish title Illuminerade figurer till Skandinaviens fauna.

== Career ==
Körner accompanied Arvidsson and Nilsson to Stockholm, where he began working closely with Nilsson to provide the illustrations for his book. Körner worked fast and diligently and soon got Nilsson's trust to carry out the entire project single-handedly. The time in Stockholm also gave Körner an opportunity to study briefly at the Royal Swedish Academy of Fine Arts. In Stockholm, Körner also learnt the relatively new technique of lithography, and on his return to Lund in 1831 Körner established a lithographic printing office there. It was one of the first in Sweden, and one of the most important during Körner's lifetime.

In 1833, Körner married his cousin, Charlotta Danielsson, who would play an important role in organising the economy of their household as well as hand-colouring many of the prints of her husband. The couple had eight children, many of which also helped out in the workshop of their father.

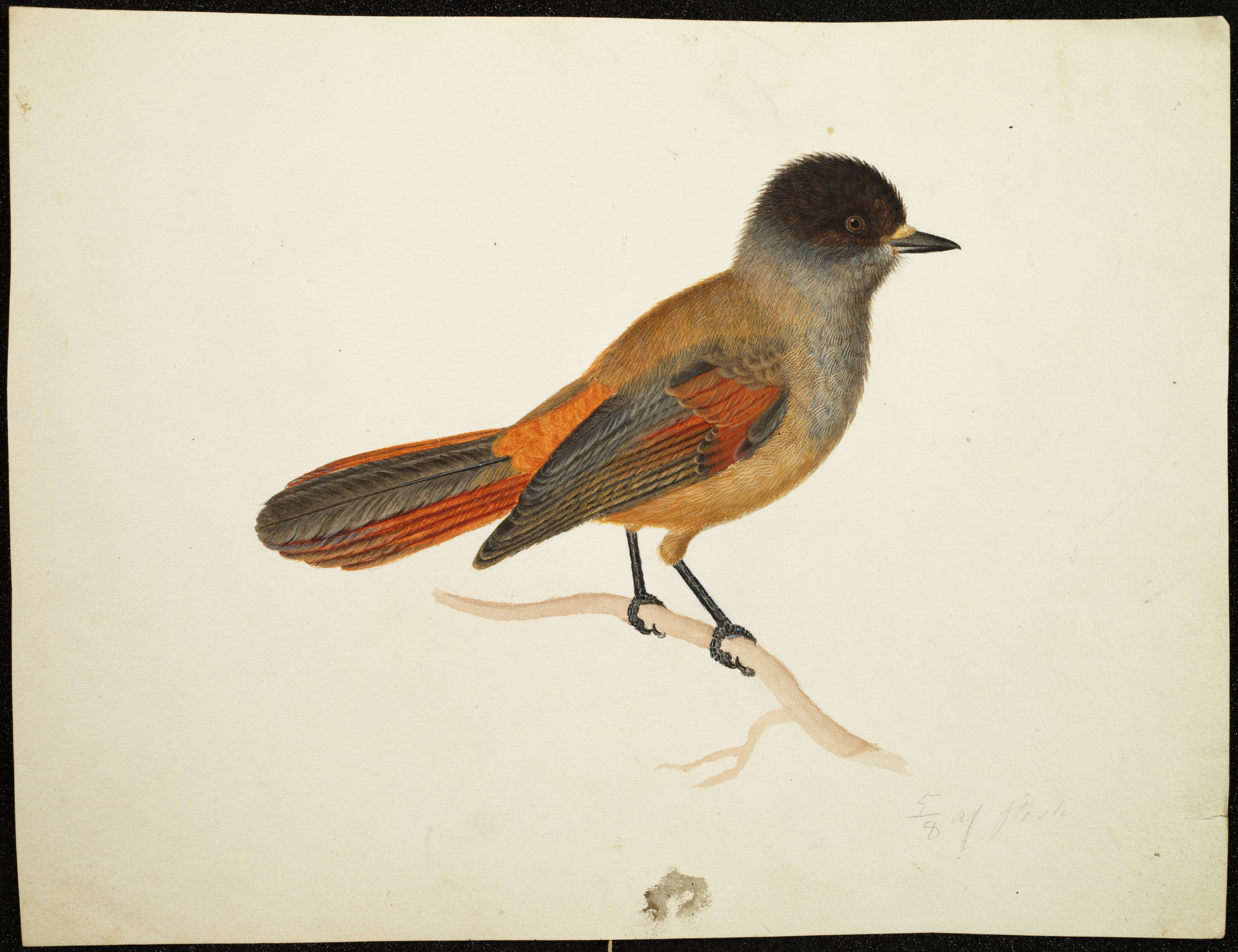
Preparatory drawing of a Siberian jay by Körner for Illuminerade figurer till Skandinaviens fauna by Sven Nilsson

Working together with Nilsson, Körner provided almost all of the illustrations for Illuminerade figurer till Skandinaviens fauna, which was published in 20 booklets (to be bound in two volumes) between 1829 and 1840. The work contained 200 lithography plates, of which 190 were made by Körner himself. Apart from his family, Körner also hired other assistants to help with the colouring by hand of the illustrations, including some who would become artists in their own right such as Nils Blommér, Johan Christoffer Boklund and Carl Fredrik Kiörboe. The book was accompanied by a text written by Sven Nilsson. The result was the most ambitious illustrated zoological work to be printed in Sweden using hand colouring techniques. From 1839 Körner started, at his own initiative, to print an essentially reduced version of this work, focused on birds: Skandinaviska foglar tecknade efter naturen. The book was without text but with smaller and occasionally new illustrations and specifically geared towards lower-income households. He followed up with a similar popular print version with illustrations of Scandinavian mammals, Skandinaviska däggdjur, which he began printing in 1855.

Apart from these major undertakings in zoological illustration, Körner illustrated many other works as well, or printed the illustrations of others in his lithographic workshop. The range was wide; stand-alone prints, portraits and illustrations for books and magazines on anatomy, botany, pomology, entomology, archaeology, hippology and topography were printed by Körner. This included jobs for purely scientific works by e.g. entomologist Anders Gustaf Dahlbom and chemist Johan Bernhard von Borck. He also made illustrations for the books of English naturalist Llewelyn Lloyd on his travels in Scandinavia.

In 1849 Körner was appointed as the official draughtsman of the university in Lund. In this position, he was required to provide new scientific publications connected with the university with illustrations. He was also expected to provide classes in drawing for students at the university. Apart from providing a fixed annual salary, the position also gave Körner the opportunity to organise art exhibitions and public lectures on various popular scientific topics, and to entertain a network of contacts with other artists in the region and beyond. Körner was also one of the first daguerreotypists in Sweden; a self-portrait by him is still preserved, and he ran an atelier in Lund in the 1850s.

Körner died in 1864, apparently exhausted from his work.

== Sources cited ==
- Dahl, Torsten, ed. (1948). Svenska män och kvinnor. Biografisk uppslagsbok [Swedish men and women. Biographical dictionary] (in Swedish). Vol. 4. Stockholm: Albert Bonnier. OCLC 4629338.
- Dal, Björn; Christensson, Jakob; Cederlund, Johan (2015). Ritade efter naturen : Magnus Körners & Sven Nilssons zoologiska planscher (in Swedish). Kjuge: Orbis Pictus. ISBN 978-91-972886-5-1.
- Dal, Björn (1996). Sveriges zoologiska litteratur 1483–1920 (in Swedish). Kjuge. ISBN 91-972886-0-8.
- Rydberg, Olof (1979). "P Magnus Körner". Svenskt biografiskt lexikon (in Swedish). Vol. 22. p. 12 – via Swedish National Archives.
- Hofberg, Herman; Heurlin, Frithiof; Millqvist, Viktor; Rubenson, Olof, eds. (1906). Svenskt biografiskt handlexikon [Swedish biographical handbook] (in Swedish). Vol. 1. Stockholm: Bonniers. OCLC 474064019.
