= Nazi Victims Memorial in Lund =

Cemetery in Sweden

Angel
- Nazi Victims' Memorial in Lund
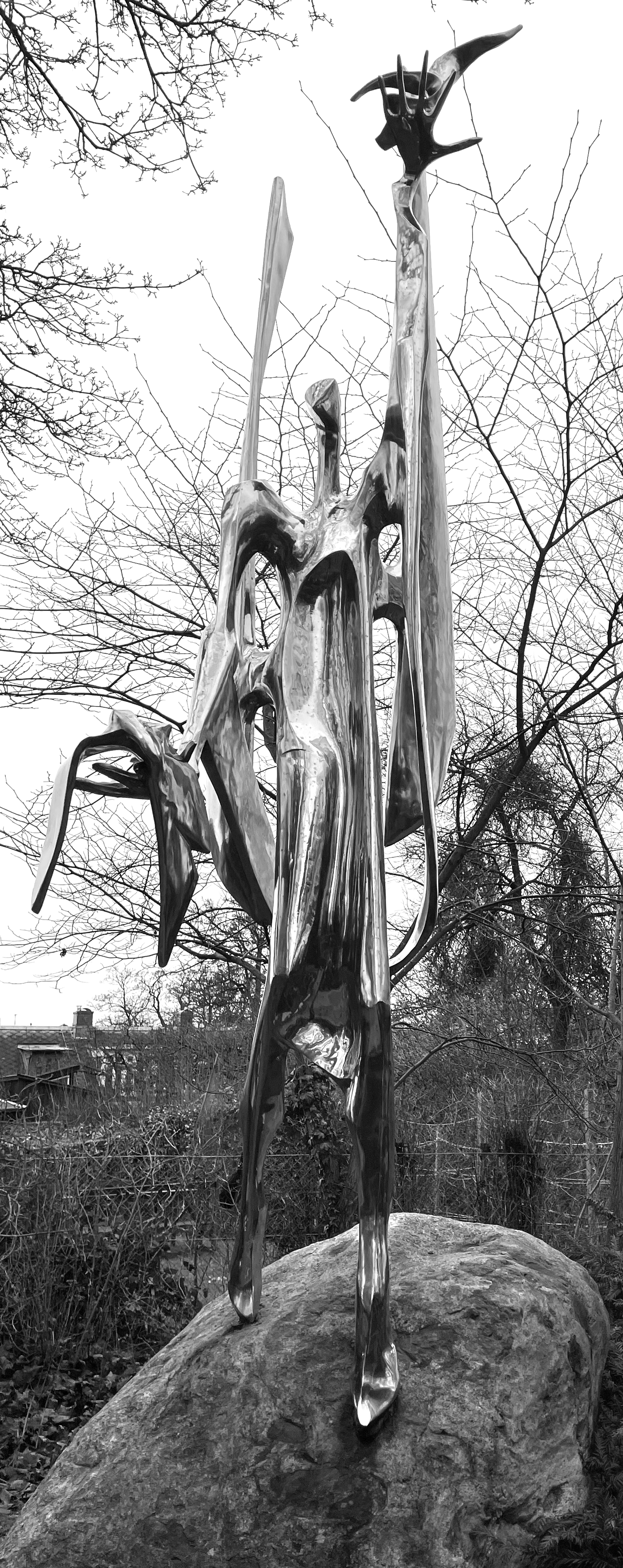
- The statue has a lead seal inscribed with the motto: Melior Mors Macula (Better Death than Disgrace)
- Artist: Nándor Wagner
- Year: 1963
- Medium: cast stainless steel
- Dimensions: 430 cm (170 in)
- 55.715571°N 13.192395°E
- Website: wagnernandor.com/statues.htm

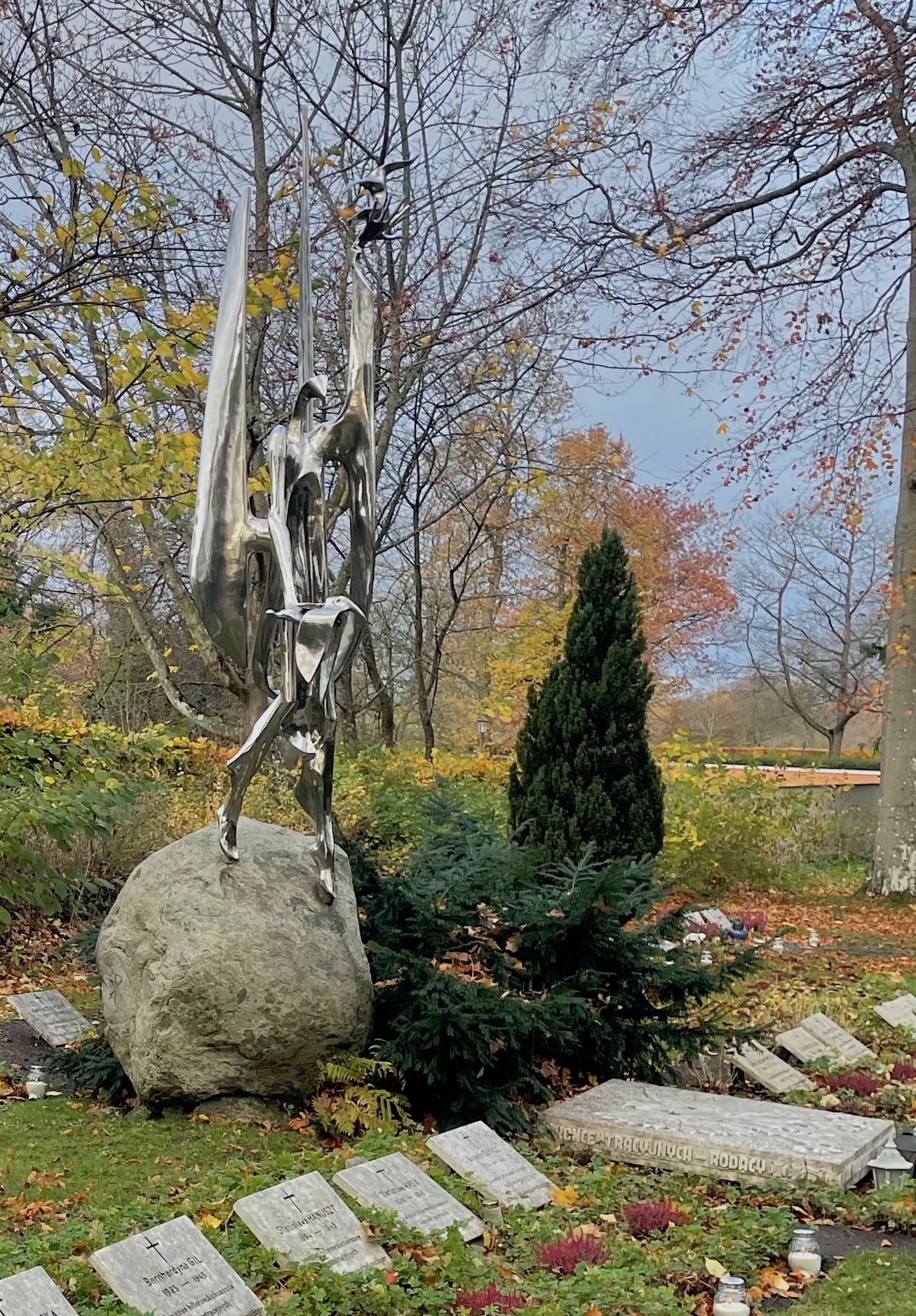
The Angle, Northern Cemetery in Lund, photo: T. Wieloch

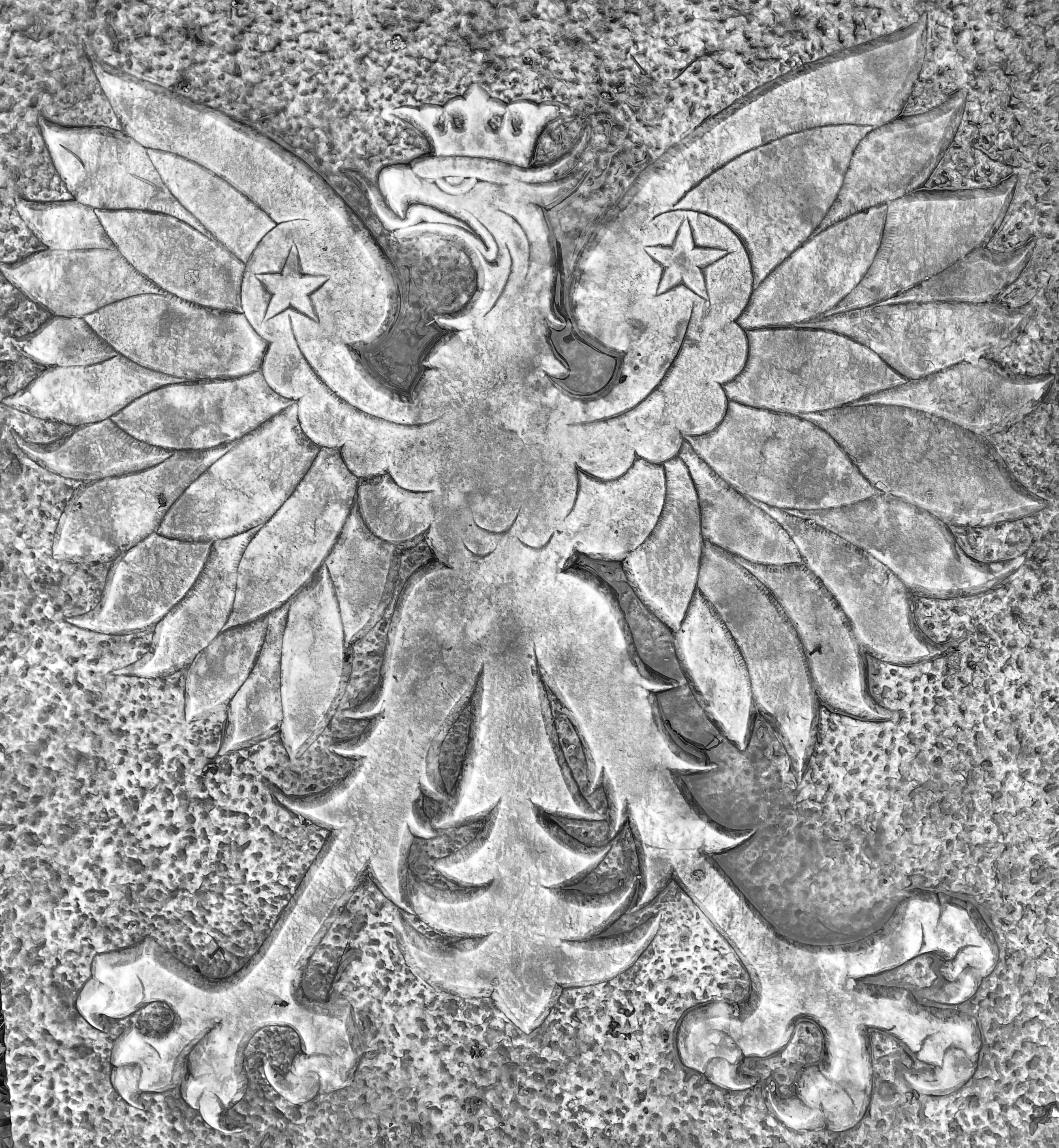
Marble plate with Poland's coat of arms, photo: T. Wieloch

The Nazi Victims Memorial in Lund is located in Northern Cemetery in Lund, Sweden. It was erected to honor the 26 Polish refugees who came to Sweden from Nazi concentration camps in Germany after the end of World War II and died shortly upon arrival. The memorial consists of a sculpture and a memorial plate.

The sculpture depicts an angel holding in his right hand a deceased dove with outstretched wings symbolizing the innocent victim who suffered martyrdom. From the left hand, a dove rises to the sky, symbolizing victory and freedom - the immortal and liberated soul of the deceased victim. The sculpture, created by the Hungarian-Swedish-Japanese artist Nándor Wagner, alludes to the Gospel of Mark 16:6 “Don't be alarmed. You are looking for Jesus the Nazarene, who was crucified. He has risen!”. In front of the sculpture is a marble plate with Poland's coat of arms, the White Eagle, with the text "To the victims of the concentration camps—Polish compatriots" engraved on the sides of the plate.

The memorial was unveiled on October 27, 1963.
