= Mysteriet på Greveholm =

- Swedish DVD Cover
- Genre: Comedy, Family, Fantasy, Mystery, Sci-fi
- Directed by: Dan Zethraeus
- Theme music composer: The Creeps
- Country of origin: Sweden
- Original language: Swedish
- No. of episodes: 24

Production
- Running time: 15 minutes

Original release
- Network: SVT1
- Release: 1 December – 24 December 1996

Related
- Jul i Kapernaum (1995); Pelle Svanslös (1997)

Mysteriet på Greveholm ("The Mystery at Greveholm") is the 1996 Swedish SVT Christmas Calendar production. It was released on VHS in October 1997 and on DVD 19 November 2001. It was voted the best Julkalender ever in Aftonbladet in 2007. A video game with the same name was released in 1997, and two sequels in 1998 (Mysteriet på Greveholm 2: Resan till Planutus) and 2000 (Mysteriet på Greveholm 3: Den gamla legenden).

The 2012 Christmas Calendar, Mysteriet på Greveholm: Grevens återkomst, is a sequel to Mysteriet på Greveholm. Although it got a few complaints from both parents and fans of the original series, it gained a decent amount of new fans.

== Premise ==
The plot follows a family deciding to spend their Christmas in the country. They intend to rent a small house, but stumble across an old castle. Mistaking two thieves for the owners they "rent" the abandoned castle. Soon their children, Ivar and Lillan, discover that the castle is haunted. At first the ghost seems to be evil, but soon the children (who are intrigued rather than terrified) befriend it. However, there is something else in the castle: something even the ghosts are frightened of.

== Plot ==
Leif (Peter Fridh) is being blamed by SVT and the newspapers of Sweden for causing a satellite to come out of its regular orbit causing a complete blackout of Sweden's public service channels much to the annoyance of his dentist wife Astrid (Anna-Lena Bergelin). Meanwhile, a disgruntled man (Carl-Åke Eriksson) is renting out his house due to being fed up by the hauntings in the neighbouring castle. Astrid reads his advertisement and goes to look for the house, but ends up mistaking the castle for the house.

Two incompetent burglars, Rolf and Ralf, are trying to break into the castle. They are mistaken by Astrid for the owners, and they "rent" it to her. Astrid brings Leif and their children Ivar, Lillan and teenager Melitta to the castle and they settle in, much to Melitta's dismay. It becomes apparent that two ghosts, Jean and Staffan, inhabit the castle and are desperate to keep living people away. They try to frighten the family away, but Astrid, Leif and Melitta ignore them, and Ivar and Lillan become fascinated and try to find proof of their existence. A friend of Lillan hands over a device that calculates electronic activity and tells her that he has read that ghosts generate electric fields.

== Cast ==
- Anna-Lena Bergelin as Astrid Olsson
- Peter Fridh as Leif Olsson
- Hanna Malmberg as Melitta Olsson
- Gustaf Åkerblom as Ivar Olsson
- Linn Bülow as Lillan Olsson
- Sven Ahlström as Jean (ghost)
- Pierre Lindstedt as Staffan (ghost)
- Andreas Andersson as Måns (paper-boy)
- Gösta Engström as Rolf (thief)
- Claes Åström as Ralf (thief)
- Monica Stenbeck as Anna-Britta (grandmother)
- Svante Lodén as the taxi driver
- Carl-Åke Eriksson as the neighbour
- Beata Heuman as Anna (the girl next door)
- Isidor Torkar as the teacher
- Emy Storm as the lady teacher
- Rune Bergman as Count von Dy, the demonic villain
- Anagil de Melo Nascimento as the princess Dioda
- Keijo Salmela as Glada laxen (tomte)
- Arne Weise as himself

== Production ==
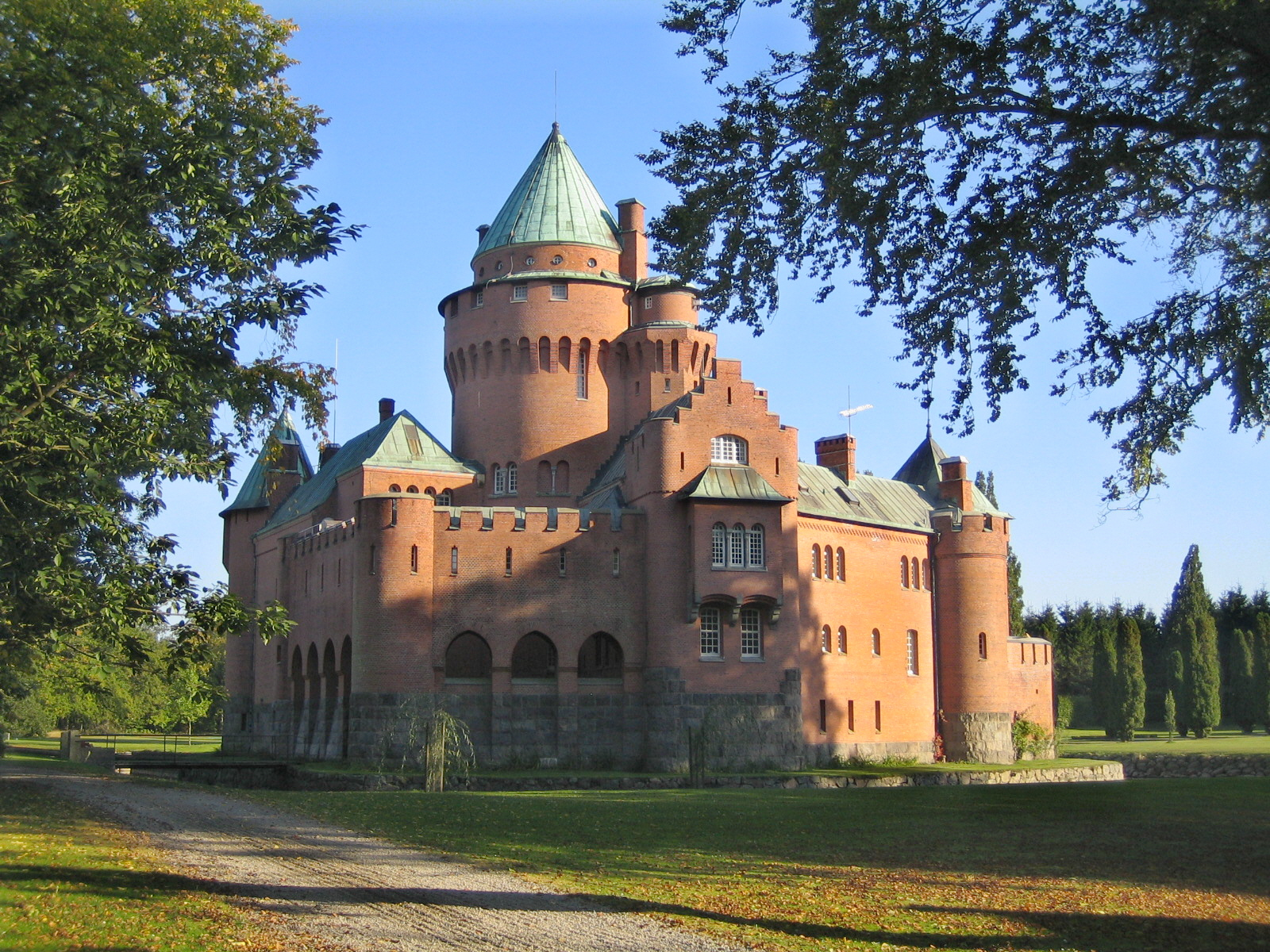
Hjularöd Castle

The outdoor scenes were recorded at Hjularöd Castle in the Eslöv Municipality, and the indoor scenes were filmed at SVT's studio in Malmö. The music was written and performed by the Swedish band The Creeps.

== Episodes ==
1. Hus att hyra (House to rent)
2. Ett märkligt slott (A strange castle)
3. Spökchock (Ghost shock)
4. Att tämja ett spöke (To tame a ghost)
5. En konstig familj (A strange family)
6. Fällan (The trap)
7. Drängen och betjänten (The horse keeper and the servant)
8. Ögonmått och synvinkel (Tools)
9. Oväntat besök (Unexpected visits)
10. Greve von Dy:s menuett (Count von Dy's minuet)
11. Skattjakten (The treasure hunt)
12. Spöktimmen (The hour of the ghost)
13. Skånes fulaste Lucia (Scania's ugliest Lucia)
14. Skatten (The treasure)
15. Lekande lätt (Easy)
16. Melittas nya vänner (Melitta's new friends)
17. Det var en gång... (Once upon a time...)
18. Spejaren (The tracker)
19. En riktig hjälte (A real hero)
20. Lillan får en idé (Lillan gets an idea)
21. Den sista striden (The final battle)
22. Dioda (Dioda)
23. Dan före dan (The day before Christmas)
24. Jul på Greveholm (Christmas at Greveholm)
