= Kastberga Manor =

Castle in Eslöv Municipality, Scania, Sweden

- Kastberga slott
- Eslöv Municipality
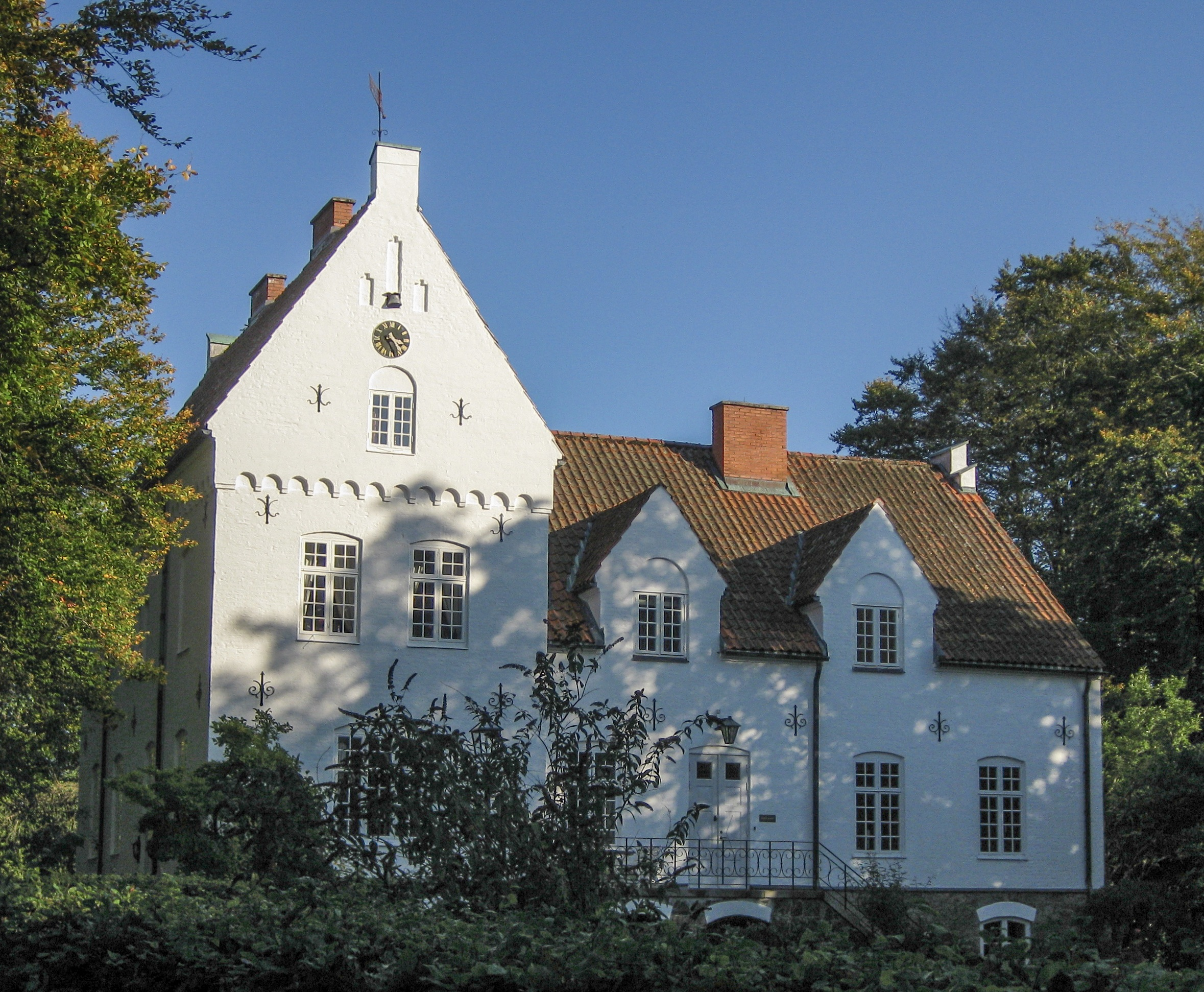
- Kastberga Manor

Site information
- Type: Castle
- Open to the public: Yes

Location
- Scania, Sweden
- Coordinates: 55.5133°N 13.2047°E

Site history
- Built: 1639

Kastberga Manor (Swedish: Kastberga slott) is located in Kastberga, Trollenäs parish, just north of Eslöv.

The manor was built by Fabian Gustaf Wrede when the Ellinge estate was divided upon the death of Carl Fredrik Dycker in 1889. Katarina Crafoord (died 2005), daughter of Gambro's founder Holger Crafoord, built up an extensive antiquarian bookshop at the castle during her time.
