= Wieloch =

Wieloch is a Polish surname. Notable people with this surname include:

- Sławomir Wieloch (born 1969), Polish ice hockey player
- Tadeusz Wieloch (born 1950), Swedish neuroscientist and entrepreneur
