= Mysteriet på Greveholm: Grevens återkomst =

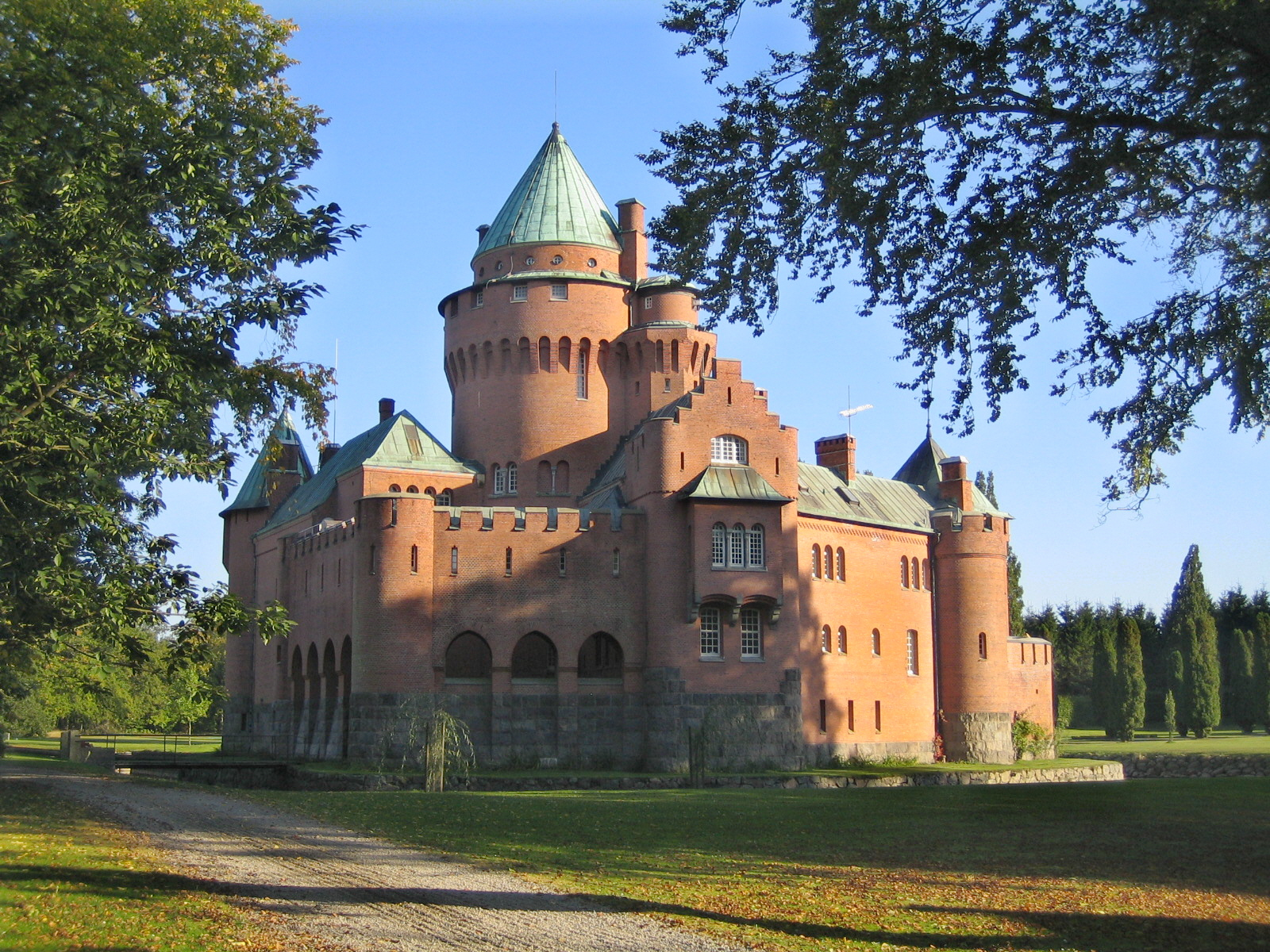
- The series was recorded at Hjularöd Castle
- Genre: children
- Directed by: Dan Zethraeus; Jesper Harrie
- Country of origin: Sweden
- Original language: Swedish
- No. of seasons: 1
- No. of episodes: 24

Production
- Producer: Jonas Sörensson
- Production company: Way Creative Films

Original release
- Network: SVT1; Barnkanalen; SVT1 HD
- Release: 1 December – 24 December 2012

Related
- Tjuvarnas jul (2011); Barna Hedenhös uppfinner julen (2013); Mysteriet på Greveholm (1996)

Mysteriet på Greveholm: Grevens återkomst ("The Mystery of the Count's Islet: The Return of the Count") was the Sveriges Television's Christmas calendar in 2012 and a follow up of the 1996 one.

== Plot ==
The series is a following up-story to the 1996 calendar Mysteriet på Greveholm, set 16 years later, when a new family has moved into the castle. The ghosts still remain in the castle, and they try their best to make the family stay for as long as possible because they felt very alone after the last family moved. However, due to mistakes made by both the ghosts and the family, something, or someone, more dangerous has different plans.

== Video ==
The series was released to DVD on 13 February 2013. It is still reguraly available on SVT's on-demand streaming service SVT Play.
