= Väggarp =

- Location within Skåne Location within Sweden
- Coordinates: 55°47′N 13°14′E
- Country: Sweden
- Province: Skåne
- County: Skåne County
- Municipality: Eslöv Municipality

Area
  - Total: 0.13 km^{2} (0.050 sq mi)

Population (31 December 2010)
  - Total: 211
  - Density: 1,582/km^{2} (4,100/sq mi)
- Time zone: UTC+1 (CET)
  - Summer (DST): UTC+2 (CEST)

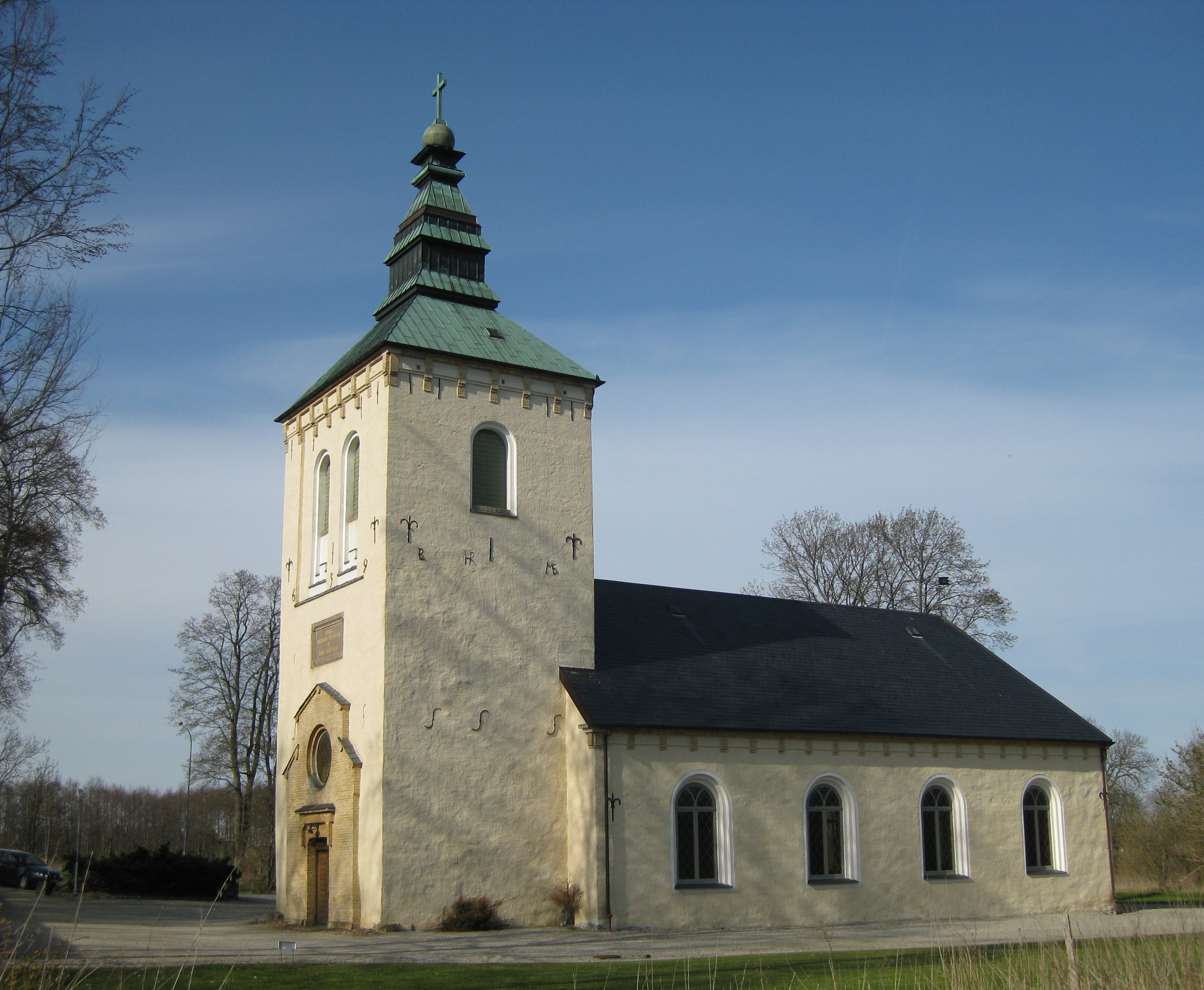
Church in Skåne, Sweden

Väggarp is a locality situated in Eslöv Municipality, Skåne County, Sweden with 211 inhabitants in 2010.
