= Anna-Lena Bergelin =

Swedish entertainer

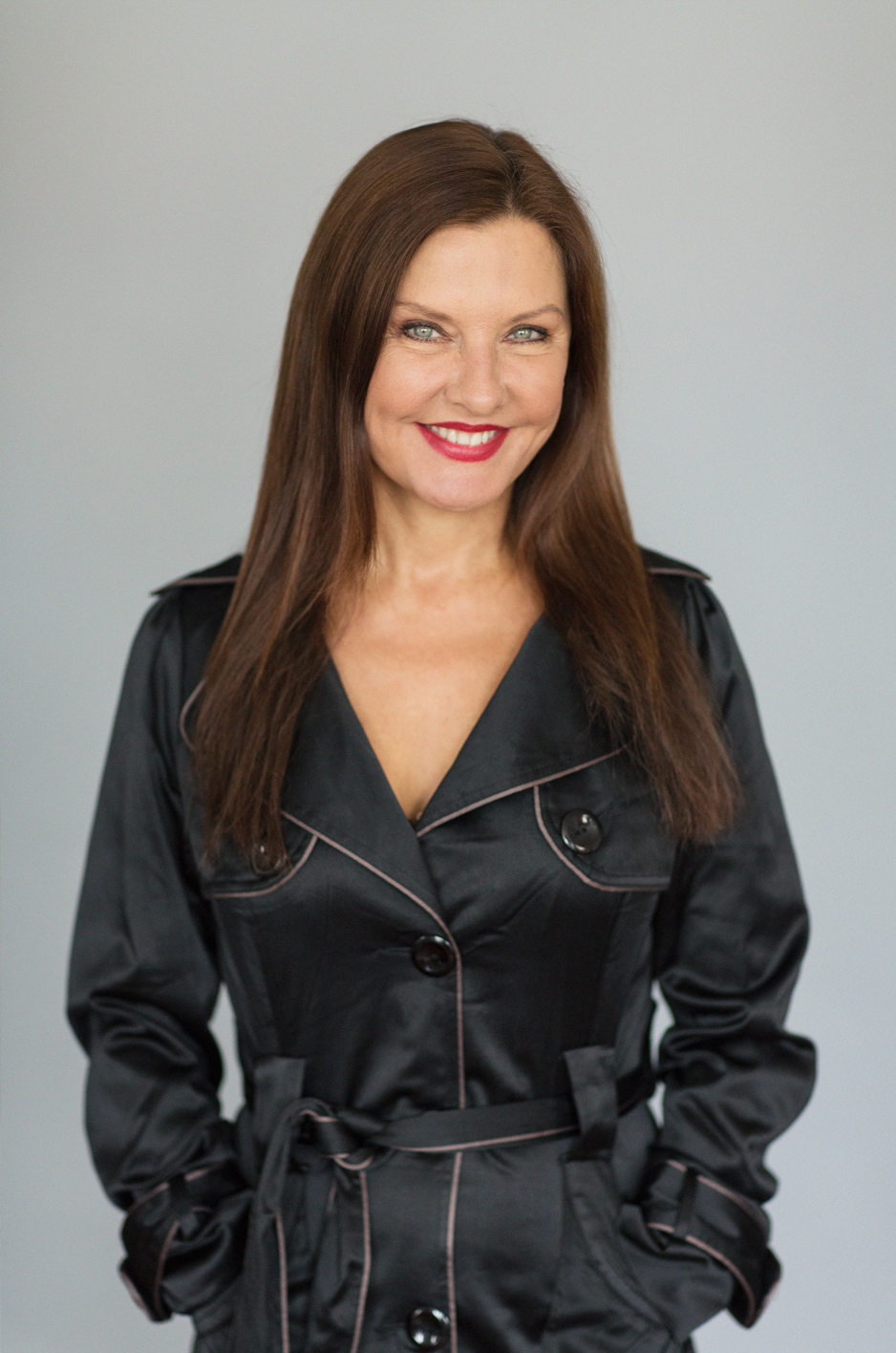
- Anna-Lena Brundin in March 2004
- Born: 12 April 1959
- Occupations: Singer, comedian, writer
- Spouse: Olof Brundin

Anna-Lena Terése Bergelin (born 12 April 1959), known as Brundin during marriage, is a Swedish writer, comedian, singer and actress.

Bergelin's father was a peddler and her mother was a retired washer from Lund. She studied to become a mime and singer.

She is best known for her role in the SVT Julkalender Mysteriet på Greveholm show in 1996.
