= Viderup Castle =

Manor house in Eslöv Municipality, Scania, Sweden

- Viderups slott
- Eslöv Municipality
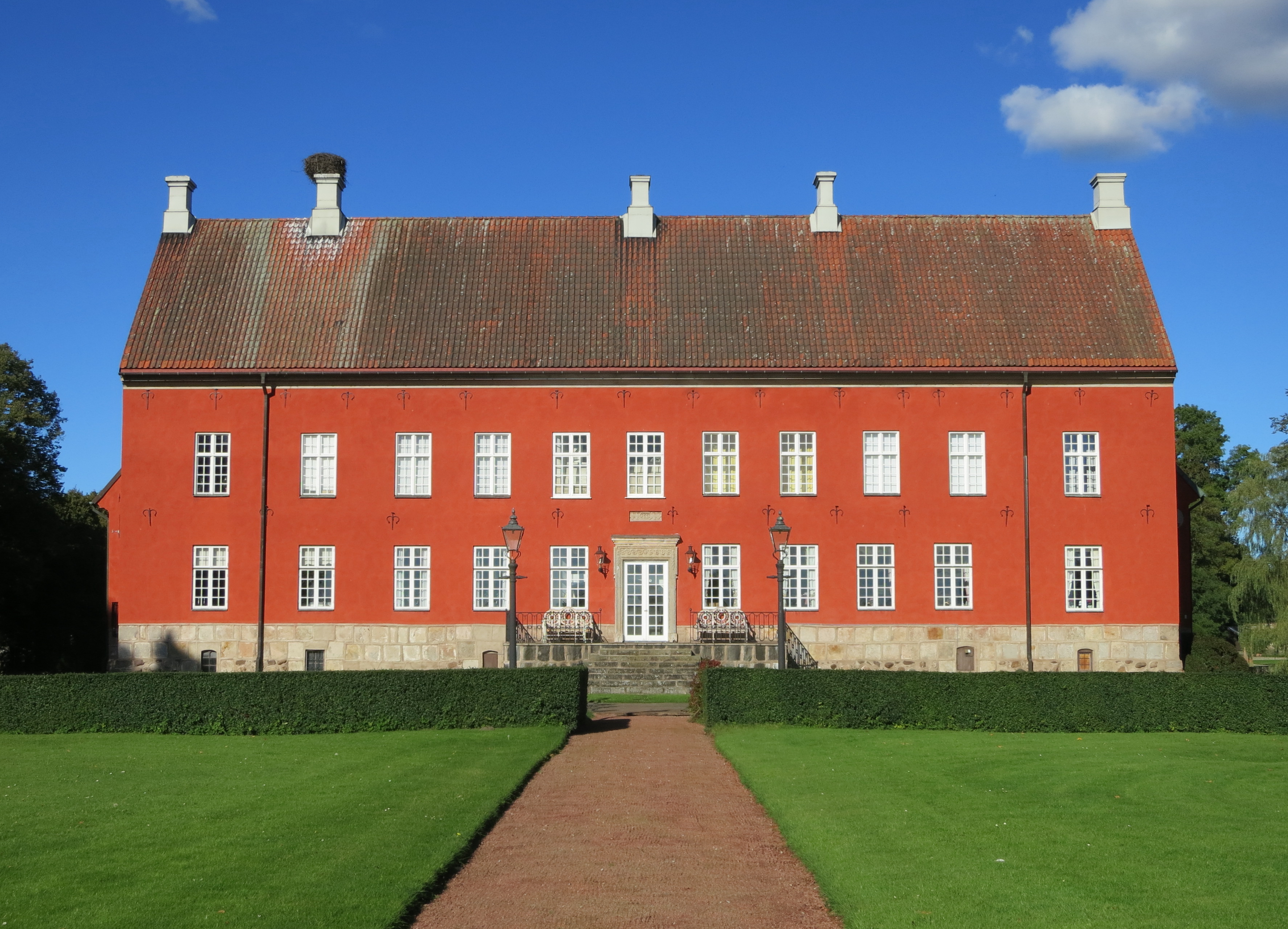
- Viderups slott

Site information
- Type: manor house
- Open to the public: No

Location
- Scania, Sweden
- Location within Skåne
- Coordinates: 55.7775°N 13.2875°E

Site history
- Built: 1617-23

Viderup Castle (Swedish: Viderups slott) is a manor house in Eslöv Municipality, Scania, Sweden. The main building has two floors together with two one-storey wings, surrounds a courtyard that is open to the north.

== History ==
Viderup manor (former spelling Hviderup) was built in Renaissance style during the early 17th century by Anne Brahe (1576-1635), widow of Steen Maltesen Sehested (1553-1611), Danish Marshal of the Realm (rigsmarsk) and commander of Froste Herred in Scania.

== See also ==
- List of castles in Sweden
