= Carl-Åke Eriksson =

Swedish actor (1934–2015)

Carl-Åke Eriksson (16 November 1934 – 7 November 2015) was a Swedish actor known for playing the sinister SS vampire in the horror-comedy Frostbite. He also appeared in several other high-profile Swedish productions like The Girl Who Kicked the Hornets' Nest, Mysteriet på Greveholm and The Simple-Minded Murderer. He was most active at Malmö City Theatre.

== Biography ==
In the 1970s, Eriksson had a successful career at Malmö City Theatre, winning awards for playing McMurphy in One Flew over the Cuckoo's Nest and George in Who's Afraid of Virginia Woolf? on stage. He appeared in a play by Lars Norén and had several minor roles in TV-series and films. In the early 1990s he had problems with alcohol and started to attend Alcoholics Anonymous. In 2005 Anders Banke approached him to play the part of Professor Gerard Beckert, a vampiric geneticist and SS officer, in Frostbite. Eriksson was not familiar with the vampire genre but thought the script was funny and had a fairy tale quality to it which he responded to. Through not his most prolific work in Sweden, he became known internationally for his creepy performance. He remained in international spotlight when he starred in the successful thriller The Girl Who Kicked the Hornets' Nest. In 2007 he was diagnosed with cancer, but treatment proved effective and he continued to be very much active in the theatric world of Stockholm. The cancer returned, though, and Eriksson died on 7 November 2015.

== Roles ==
- 1959 - Mälarpirater
- 1968 - Något att tala om i framtide
- 1980 - Syndabocken
- 1982 - The Simple-Minded Murderer
- 1996 - Mysteriet på Greveholm
- 2002 - Taurus
- 2006 - Frostbite
- 2009 - The Girl Who Kicked the Hornets' Nest
