= Kungshult =

- Location within Skåne Location within Sweden
- Coordinates: 55°51′N 13°24′E
- Country: Sweden
- Province: Skåne
- County: Skåne County
- Municipality: Eslöv Municipality

Area
  - Total: 0.33 km^{2} (0.13 sq mi)

Population (31 December 2010)
  - Total: 354
  - Density: 1,089/km^{2} (2,820/sq mi)
- Time zone: UTC+1 (CET)
  - Summer (DST): UTC+2 (CEST)

Kungshult (Swedish pronunciation: [ˈkɵ̌ŋshɵlt]) is a locality situated in Eslöv Municipality, Skåne County, Sweden with 354 inhabitants in 2010.
