= Pirates on the Mälaren =

1959 film

- Directed by: Per G. Holmgren
- Written by: Sigfrid Siwertz (novel); Per G. Holmgren
- Starring: Carl-Åke Eriksson; Gunnar Björnstrand; Åke Grönberg
- Cinematography: Åke Dahlqvist
- Edited by: Oscar Rosander
- Music by: Åke Grönberg; Charles Redland
- Production company: Omegafilm
- Distributed by: Svensk Filmindustri
- Release date: 26 December 1959
- Running time: 113 minutes
- Country: Sweden
- Language: Swedish

Pirates on the Mälaren (Swedish: Mälarpirater) is a 1959 Swedish drama film directed by Per G. Holmgren and starring Carl-Åke Eriksson, Gunnar Björnstrand and Åke Grönberg. It is a remake of the 1923 silent film of the same title in which a group of boys go sailing on the Mälaren, a large lake near Stockholm.

== Cast ==
- Gunnar Björnstrand as Greven
- Christina Lundquist as Karin
- Åke Grönberg as Frasse Flinta
- Tomas Bolme as Erik
- Christian Bratt as Karin's Friend
- Carl-Åke Eriksson as Georg
- Siegfried Fischer as Engman
- Sven-Eric Gamble as Johan
- Elof Ahrle as Truck Driver
- Marianne Karlbeck as Leontine Schalén
- Jan Malmsjö as Max
- Monica Nielsen as Eva
- Gunnar Olsson as Karl Scholke
- Svenerik Perzon as Fabian
- Sif Ruud as Kristin
- Hans Strååt as Konrad Schalén
- Ilse-Nore Tromm as Mrs. Scholke
