= Marieholm, Eslöv =

Marieholm
- Location within Skåne Location within Sweden
- Coordinates: 55°52′N 13°09′E
- Country: Sweden
- Province: Skåne
- County: Skåne County
- Municipality: Eslöv Municipality

Area
  - Total: 1.27 km^{2} (0.49 sq mi)

Population (2023)
  - Total: 1,734
  - Density: 1,258/km^{2} (3,260/sq mi)
- Time zone: UTC+1 (CET)
  - Summer (DST): UTC+2 (CEST)

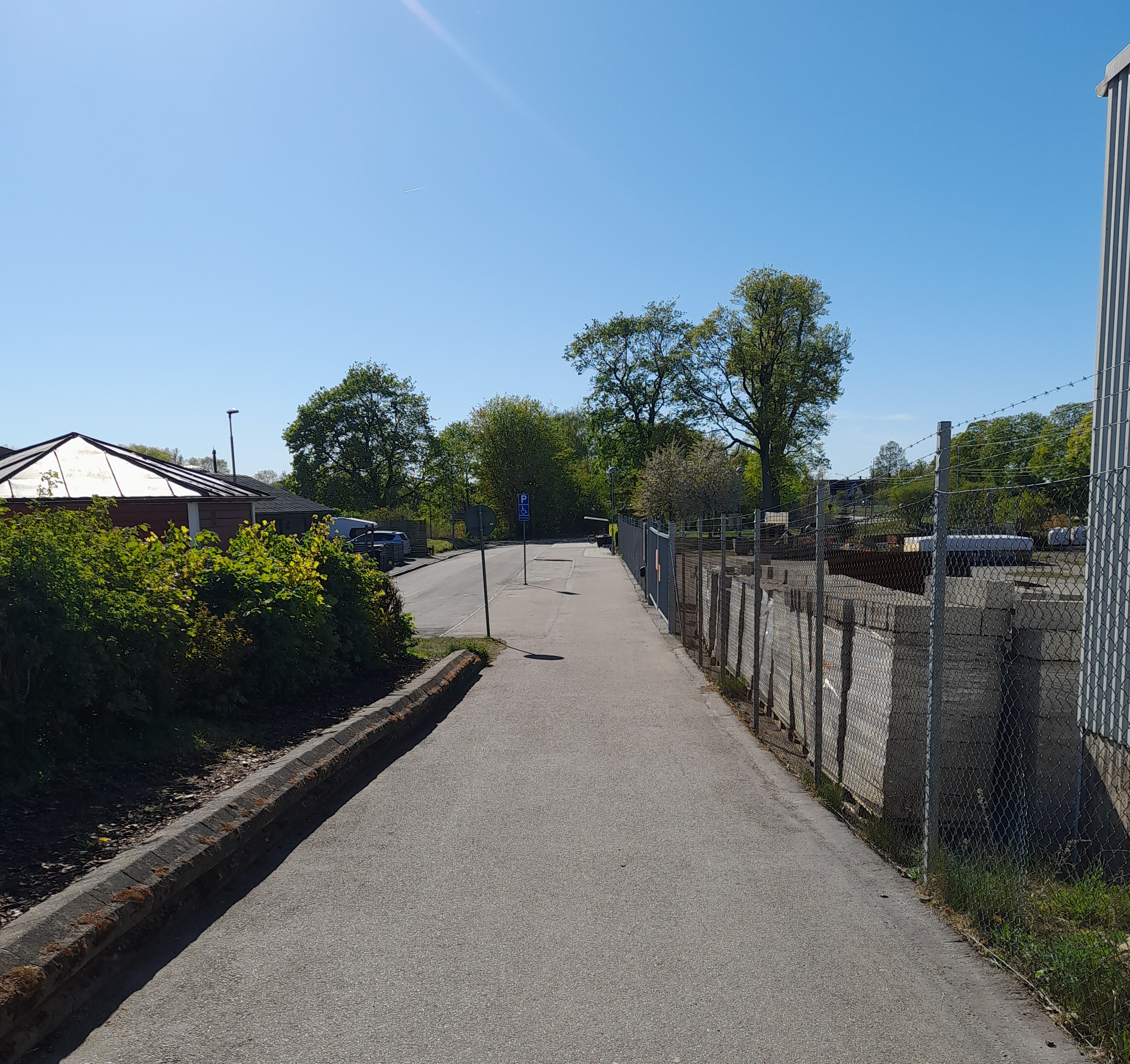
The centre of Marieholm, 2026

Marieholm is a locality situated in Eslöv Municipality, Skåne County, Sweden with 1,734 inhabitants as of 2023.
