= Hjularöd Castle =

Manor house in Scania, Sweden

- Hjularöds slott
- Eslöv Municipality
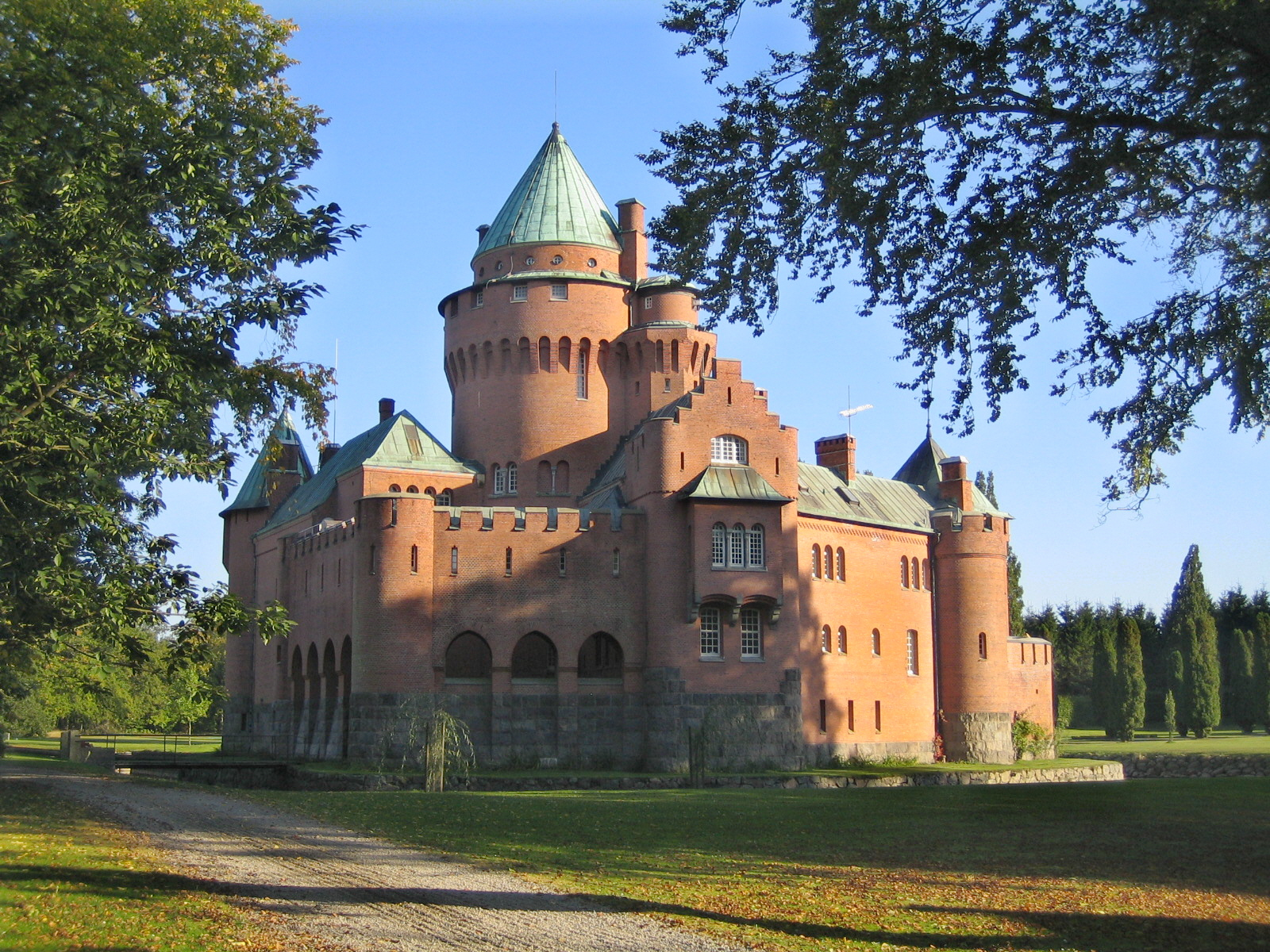
- Hjularöd Castle

Site information
- Type: Castle
- Open to the public: No

Location
- Scania, Sweden
- Coordinates: 55.735°N 13.558889°E

Site history
- Built: 1894-97

Hjularöd Castle (Swedish: Hjularöds slott) is a manor house at Eslöv Municipality in Scania, Sweden.

== History ==
The estate was first mentioned in 1391. The main house was built in 1894–1897 for chamberlain Hans Gustaf Toll. French medieval castles, the château de Pierrefonds in particular, were inspiration for the manor when architects Isak Gustaf Clason (1856 –1930) and Lars Israel Wahlman (1870–1952) designed it. The manor has been owned by members of the Bergengren family since 1926 and is not open to the public. Outside scenes from the 1996 Swedish SVT Christmas Calendar production Mysteriet på Greveholm were filmed in the courtyard of the manor.

== See also ==
- List of castles in Sweden
