= Nándor Wagner =

Hungarian artist and sculptor

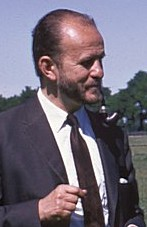
- Wagner in Sweden (1964)
- Born: October 7, 1922; Oradea, Kingdom of Romania
- Died: November 15, 1997 (aged 75); Mooka, Tochigi, Japan
- Education: Budapest Art Academy
- Known for: Artist and sculptor
- Spouse: Chiyo Wagner

Nándor Wagner (7 October 1922 – 15 November 1997) was a Hungarian artist and sculptor. He was the son of a dentist, and was born in Oradea (Nagyvárad in Hungarian), Romania. Wagner studied at the Budapest Art Academy before and after World War II. He had three art periods as living in Hungary (1945–56), Sweden (1956–71) and Japan (1972–97) respectively. He became well known for his novel cast stainless steel sculptures made in Sweden and Japan.

He and his Japanese wife, Chiyo Wagner, established the TAO Research Institute of World Culture and Development, which continues to support education of young talented artists and promotion of the arts in Mashiko. They also initiated the establishment of Academia Humana Foundation in Hungary, which has been operating since 1999.

He died in Mooka near his studio on 15 November 1997. The place for his grave was selected and prepared by him in the garden of his Mashiko studio.

== Sculpture ==
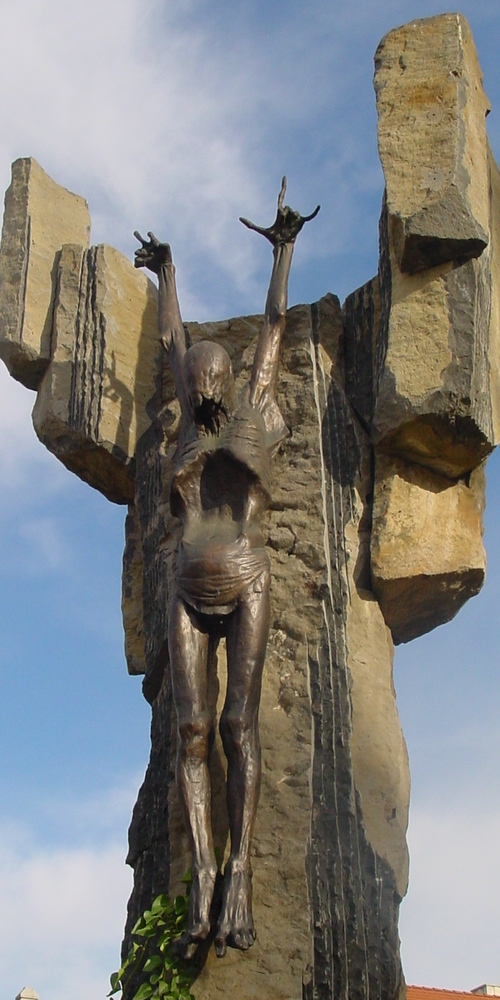
Corpus Hungaricum (1951), bronze, Székesfehérvár, Hungary

After the war in his studio at Ybl Bazár in Budapest he created statues: the Corpus Hungaricum, Attila József the poet and Sorrow of Mother among others. Jointly with Zoltán Farkasdy architect they won first prize with their plan titled Fountain with three boys at the competition for art composition to Jászai Mari square just at the foot of the Margit Bridge in 1955. Besides and parallel to making sculptures he organized the local historical collection at St. István Museum of Székesfehérvár with placing the objects found at excavations in a correctly reconstructed environment created by artist between 1952 and 1956. This activity has been recognized and honored by the British Museum.

He gave courses in art to talented students who were refused to enter universities before the 1956 Hungarian Revolution. He was elected to be a board member of the Revolutionary Committee of the Artist during the revolution. He worded his adherence as: We who are working at the museums had only one oath: to protect the Hungarian culture with all our strength, without any condition! Called upon art students to take drawing tools instead of guns to record the moments of revolution on the streets for the future.

After the Soviet army suppression of the 1956 Revolution he had to leave Hungary and Sweden received him and his family. Soon he established his studio in Lund. He invented a new calculation method how to overcome the shrinkage problem at casting large-scale statues and art objects from stainless steel. Eight such monuments were erected around the country among them War Memorial for Polish Soldiers, Tranås, Fountain with four children, Clown and Nazi Victims Memorial in Lund. He was very active and inventive also in painting and drawing. He developed a novel painting technique, which he named as paper fresco. Here basically the paper pulp was carried up in few centimeters thickness and the paint was applied to color some part of the pulp itself, but after drying chiseling was also applied to get the paper fresco final form.

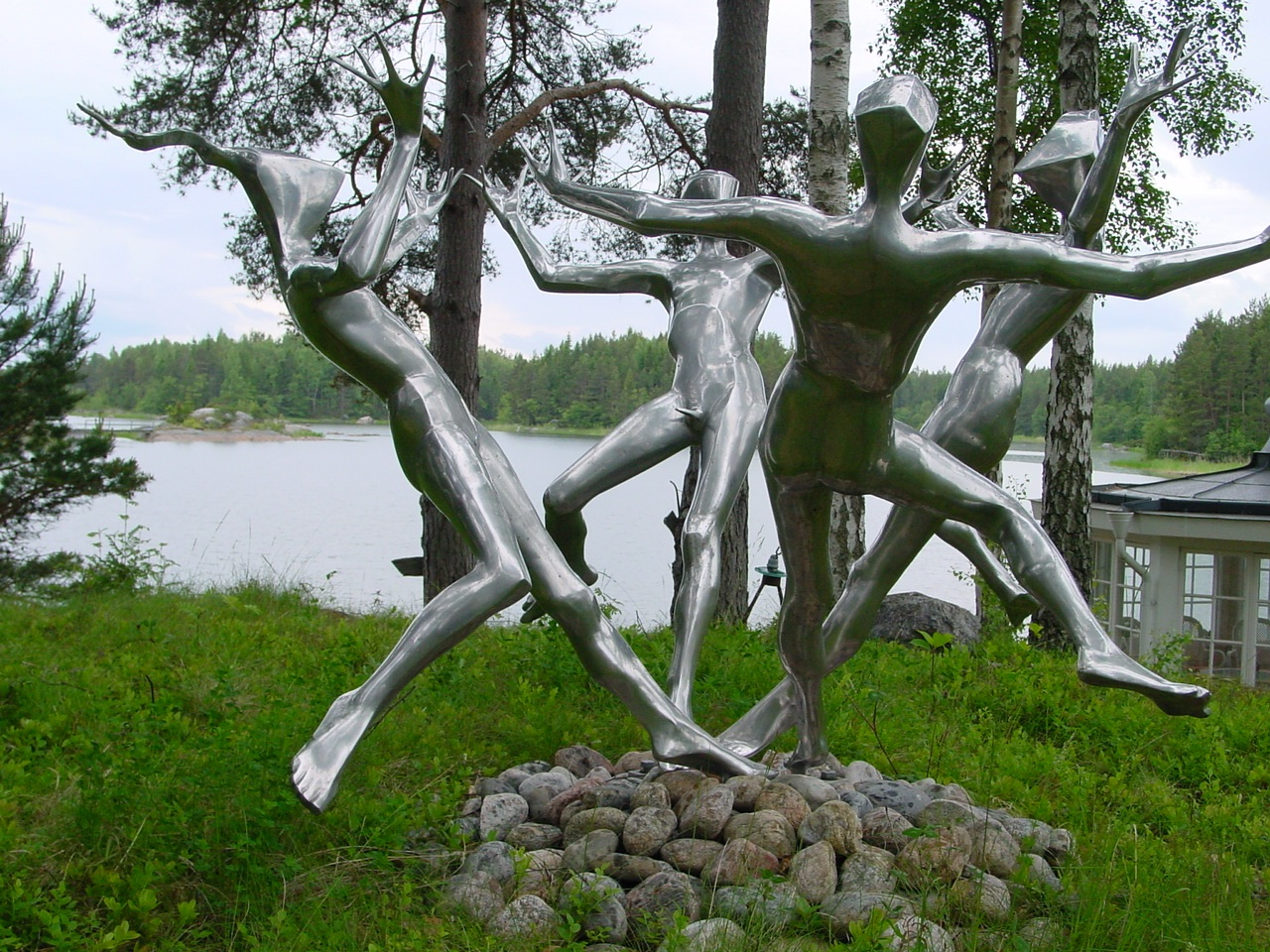
Four Children Fountain (1964), cast stainless steel, Eskön, Sweden.

In Sweden he was active with industrial design as well, got a patent for a new line of street lightning fixtures and also a model chair to ergonomic design has been developed by him. Although the Swedish period of his life was perhaps the most productive but privation and hardship came along with it and he left his family. At the Art Academy of Lund he was teaching drawing based on his skeleton support approach a novelty again. He met Chiyo Akiyama art student who then became his wife and partner for the rest of his life.

The third period of his life started in Japan in 1969, where his art opened at full scale. First the Wagner couple built a studio by themselves in Mashiko, Tochigi Prefecture, primarily known for its local pottery Mashiko ware. The studio was ready and he got clay in his hand on 31 December 1970 and Mother with Child a terracotta piece was born. His name was founded in Japan by winning the contest of creating large size art objects for the hotel area of the New International Tokyo Airport in Narita. A 6 m tall two-figure statue of Patron Saint of Travelers (Dosojin) was erected and also a 12 m in diameter rainbow fountain was placed in front of Narita View Hotel both made from stainless steel. Also he got the commission to design and construct the surrounding park.

Parallel to sculpting he started to paint fine aquarelles and creating more ceramics. His terracotta series Silk Road contains 32 figures which are representing a step by step change in the composition starting from the typical Orient flame shape to the well known traditional European presentation forms of man, animal, bird and flower. This series is an example how to connect the sculpting styles of Orient and Occident gradually using the stylistic element along the Silk Road.

In Mashiko, the Garden of Philosophy was born an important spiritual message to the current and next generations. This composition was made in peace and harmony but not to make money he said.

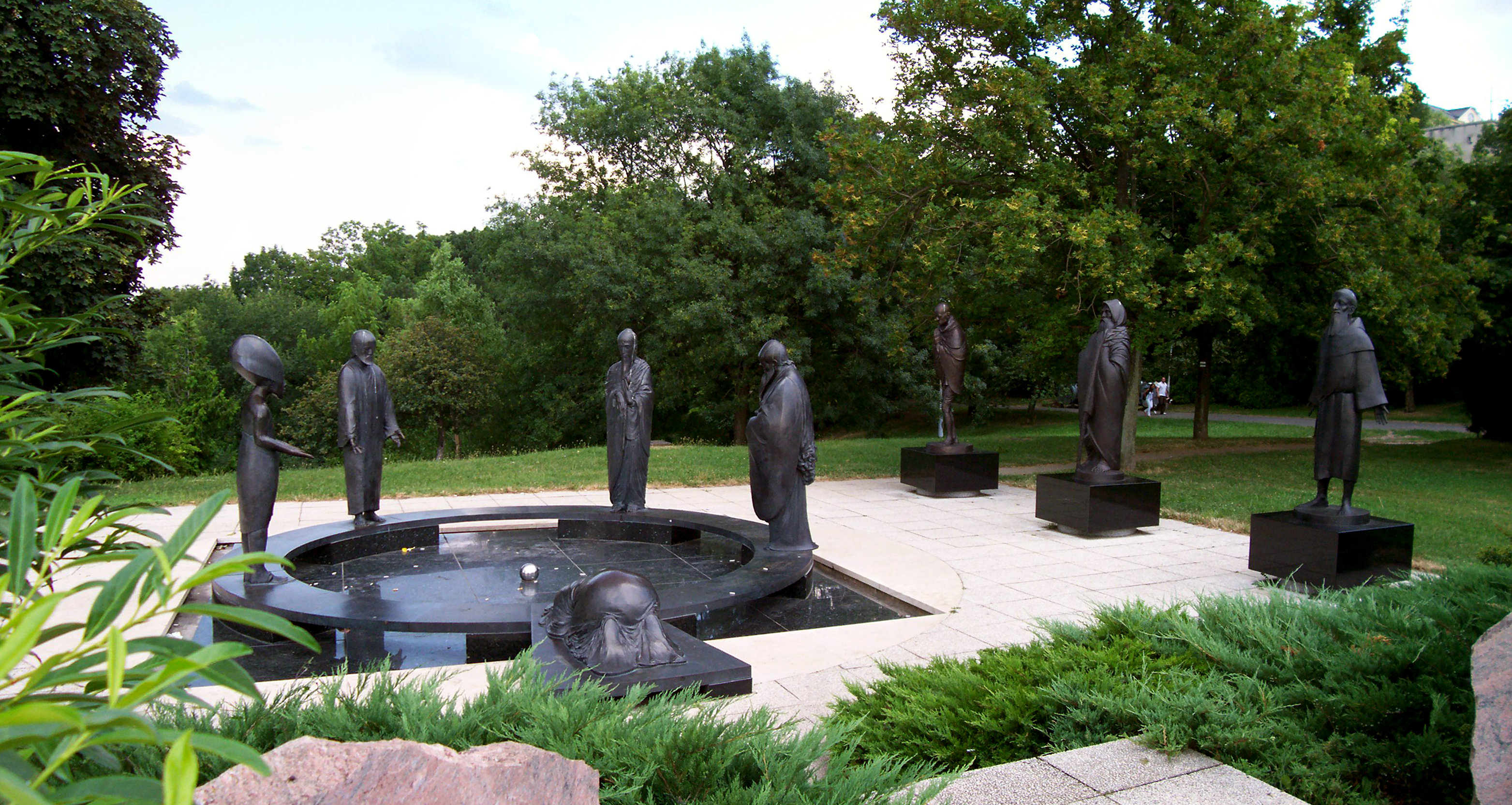
Garden of Philosophy on Gellért Hill in Budapest, a group of eight statues "for better mutual understanding".

He wrote: The Garden of Philosophy is exactly the step toward this direction. It is created to start from one centre. Around this centre point there are three rings. The first one is a complete ring around the centre point. The five figures (Abraham, Echnaton, Jesus, Buddha and Lao Tse) around the centre point are symbolizing different culture of the world. They made the ideas and became founder of main religions of the world. The centre of each religion has different name like Kami, Hotoke, God or Allah but itself is not different. The second ring is the group of people from different culture and time who resulted in spiritual enlightenment and everyone in the same way they acted this result in practice in their society (Mahatma Gandhi, Bodhidarma and Saint Francis). The third ring is a group of people of law in different country and different time. They made a law, which became mainstream of existing laws of today. They are Hamurabi, Justinianus and Shotoku Taishi. This road of the Garden of Philosophy shows development of human kind and time brings us the question for necessity of new common law of the world to be discussed.

Three complete sets were cast one for Japan, one for Hungary and one for United States. The group of statues that was presented to Hungary in 1997 was unveiled on Gellért Hill on 18 October 2001. The group of eleven statues version of Garden of Philosophy was presented to Japan in 2009 commemorating the 140th and 50th anniversary of Hungarian-Japanese diplomatic relationship. It was unveiled in Tetsugaku-dō Park in Nakano, Tokyo on 4 December 2009.
