= Gårdstånga =

Locality in Sweden

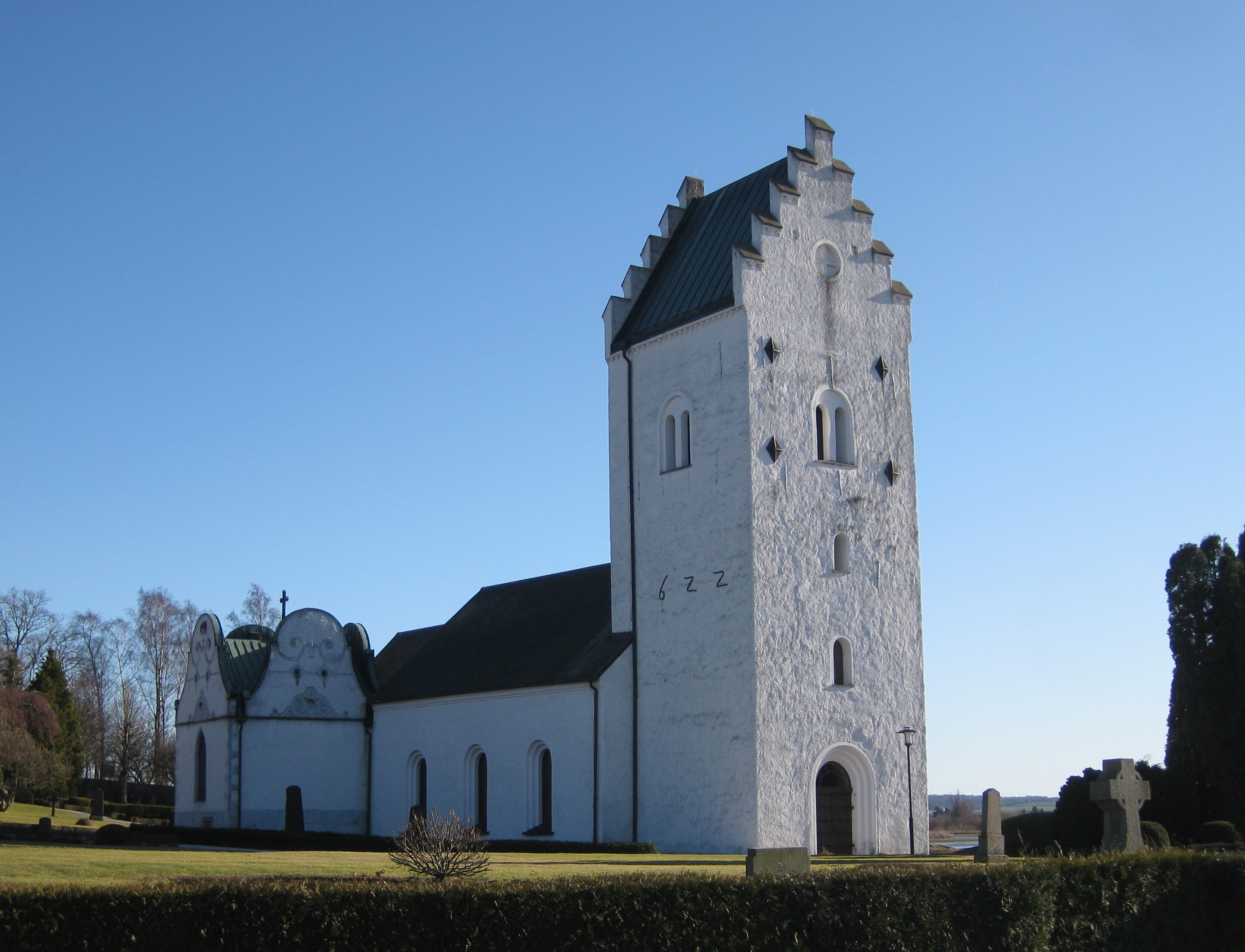
- Gårdstånga church

- Location within Skåne Location within Sweden
- Coordinates: 55°46′N 13°21′E
- Country: Sweden
- Province: Skåne
- County: Skåne County
- Municipality: Eslöv Municipality

Area
  - Total: 0.43 km^{2} (0.17 sq mi)

Population (31 December 2010)
  - Total: 343
  - Density: 792/km^{2} (2,050/sq mi)
- Time zone: UTC+1 (CET)
  - Summer (DST): UTC+2 (CEST)

Gårdstånga is a locality situated in Eslöv Municipality, Skåne County, Sweden with 343 inhabitants in 2010. Route E66 ran straight through the village until 1984 when the road routed was outside the community.

Gårdstånga is an ancient community located at the bridge over the River Kävlingeån along the highway between Malmö and Kristianstad. It is believed to have been settled since the 10th century.

Gårdstånga church dates from the 13th century. The pulpit (1612), altarpiece (1612) and font (1621) from Gårdstånga church are the works of Danish sculptor and carver Jakob Kremberg, who was a prominent maker of church carvings in Skåne during the reign of Christian IV, King of Denmark and Norway.

Gårdstånga is the site of a Bronze Age burial mound, in Swedish Gravhög from the Old Norse word haugr meaning mound.

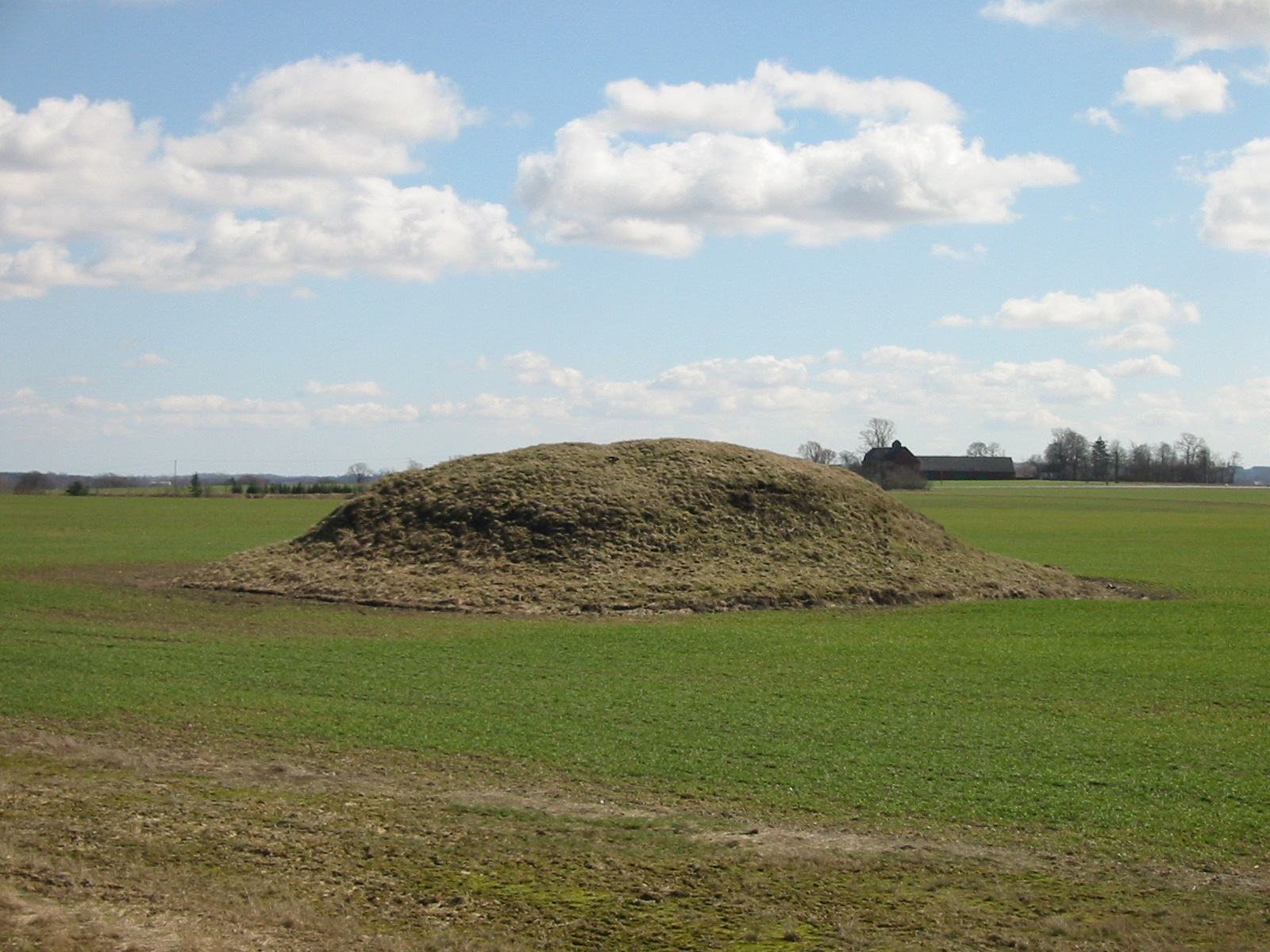
Burial mound (Swedish: Gravhög) in Gårdstånga
