= Eslöv Municipality =

Eslöv Municipality Eslövs kommun
- Municipality
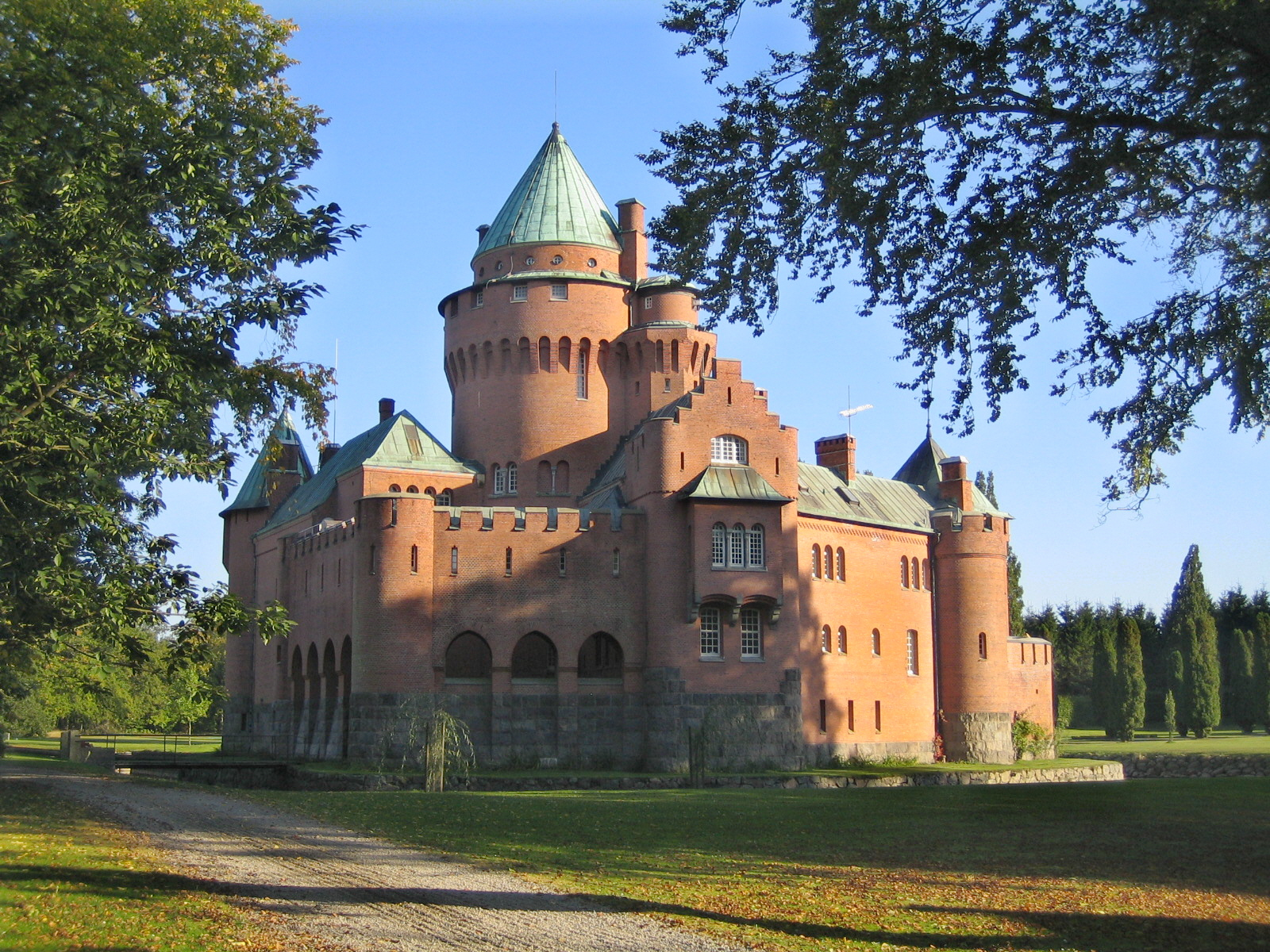
- Hjularöd Castle

- Coat of arms

- Coordinates: 55°50′N 13°18′E
- Country: Sweden
- County: Skåne County
- Seat: Eslöv

Area
  - Total: 424.68 km^{2} (163.97 sq mi)
  - Land: 419.06 km^{2} (161.80 sq mi)
  - Water: 5.62 km^{2} (2.17 sq mi)
- Area as of 1 January 2014.

Population (30 June 2025)
  - Total: 35,012
  - Density: 83.549/km^{2} (216.39/sq mi)
- Time zone: UTC+1 (CET)
  - Summer (DST): UTC+2 (CEST)
- ISO 3166 code: SE
- Province: Scania
- Municipal code: 1285
- Website: www.eslov.se

Eslöv Municipality (Swedish: Eslövs kommun) is one of 290 municipalities of Sweden, situated in Skåne County in southern Sweden. Its seat is located in the city of Eslöv.

The present municipality was created in 1971, when the former City of Eslöv was amalgamated with a number of surrounding municipalities, most of them created by the earlier nationwide local government reform in 1952.

The municipality has several interesting places. There are 11 castles. Hjularöd's castle was the setting of the Swedish TV classic Mystery of Greveholm broadcast by SVT. In the Västra Strö village by the church there is an ancient monument consisting of five standing stones and two runestones DR 334 and DR 335 dating from about the year 1000. Sweden's only sugar refinery lies in Örtofta, south of Eslöv. In Eslöv there are two nature reserves, Allmänningen and Abullahagen. The Stone Mountain, Eslöv Church and Hotel Sten Stensson Sten with the locally famous "Scanish Steps" lie in the middle of Eslöv. Maybe the most famous inhabitant of Eslöv is the comedian Johan Glans, who has made several TV series and is well known throughout the country.

== Localities ==
There are 13 urban areas in the municipality. As of 2015, they were:

#	Locality	Population
1	Eslöv	18,592
2	Marieholm	1,604
3	Löberöd (part of)	1,241
4	Stehag	1,191
5	Flyinge	992
6	Harlösa	780
7	Billinge	434
8	Hurva	376
9	Gårdstånga	366
10	Kungshult	365
11	Stockamöllan	293
12	Örtofta	283
13	Väggarp	229

== Demographics ==
This is a demographic table based on Eslöv Municipality's electoral districts in the 2022 Swedish general election sourced from SVT's election platform, in turn taken from SCB official statistics.

In total there were 34,522 residents, including 24,959 Swedish citizens of voting age. 41.7% voted for the left coalition and 56.7% for the right coalition. Indicators are in percentage points except population totals and income.

Location	Residents	Citizen adults	Left vote	Right vote	Employed	Swedish parents	Foreign heritage	Income SEK	Degree
Location			%	%					
Berga	1,723	1,170	48.6	49.3	66	50	50	20,767	30
Billinge	987	773	40.8	56.9	80	84	16	24,826	37
Centrum	2,271	1,585	48.0	48.5	64	54	46	18,290	30
Centrum SO	1,768	1,386	42.4	56.0	74	65	35	22,136	33
Centrum V	1,929	1,391	51.1	47.6	74	69	31	23,687	44
Flyinge	1,896	1,348	38.3	60.9	87	83	17	30,771	52
Harlösa	1,674	1,233	36.0	62.5	84	82	18	26,268	41
Karlsro	1,869	1,500	45.6	52.6	82	74	26	25,278	44
Löberöd	1,760	1,290	31.3	67.4	84	83	17	26,198	38
Marieholm	2,105	1,436	33.8	64.2	79	76	24	24,179	30
Norr	2,134	1,578	44.7	54.1	80	68	32	24,456	42
Rönneberga	2,201	1,465	47.9	50.1	69	48	52	21,097	32
Sallerup	2,276	1,601	42.2	56.2	76	71	29	24,781	33
Skarhult	1,517	1,075	34.4	64.3	82	82	18	27,555	42
Solkullen	2,208	1,596	43.0	56.4	83	76	24	28,129	43
Stehag	2,186	1,583	41.9	56.4	87	91	9	28,788	52
Väster	2,146	1,592	42.6	56.3	87	83	17	29,992	52
Västra Strö	1,023	782	30.7	68.1	86	86	14	27,263	35
Örtofta	849	575	46.3	53.1	83	78	22	29,151	48
Source: SVT

== Twin towns - Sister cities ==
- (Norway) Asker
- (Denmark) Rudersdal
- (Iceland) Garðabær
- (Finland) Jakobstad
- (Estonia) Viljandi

== Gallery ==
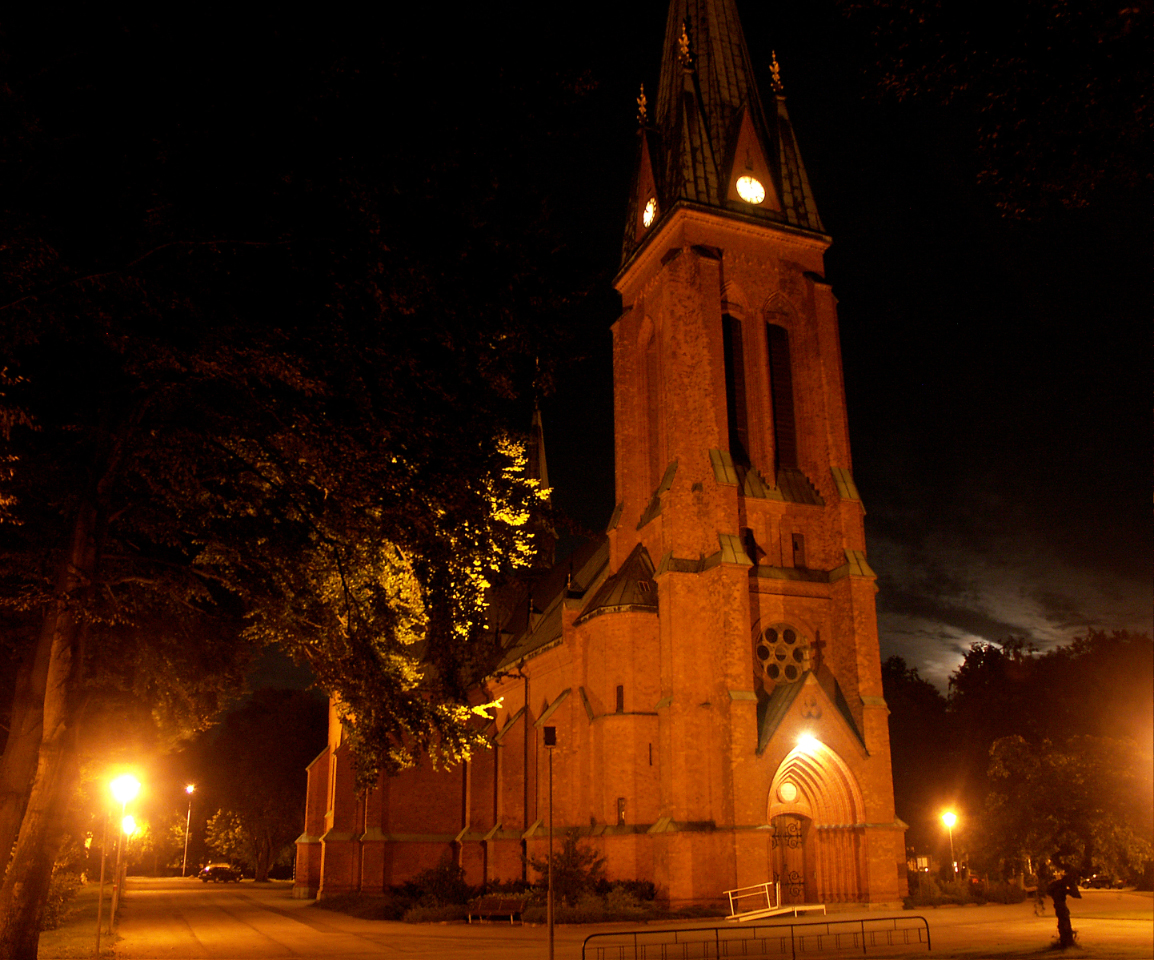
Eslöv church at night

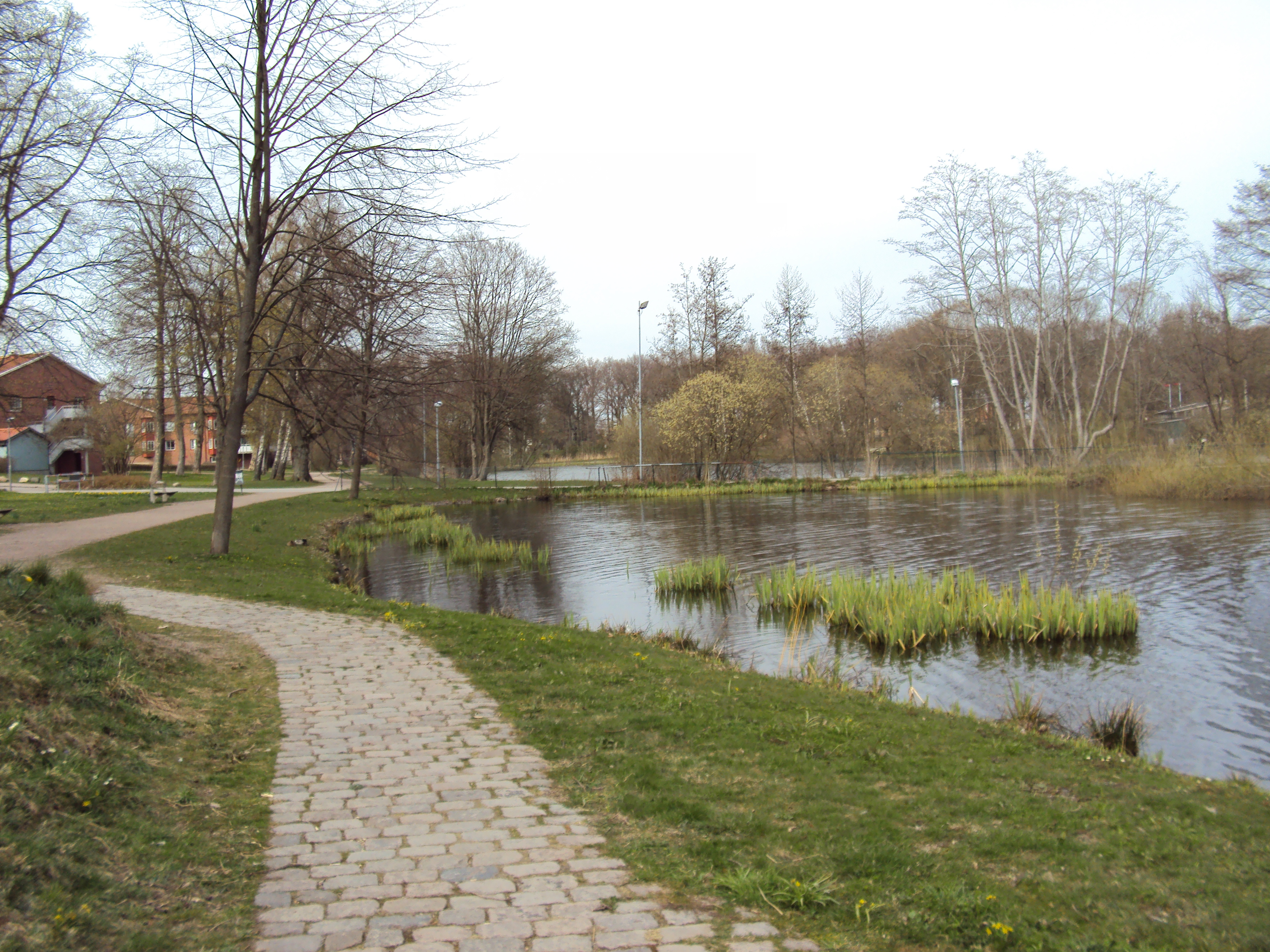
Trollsjön lake

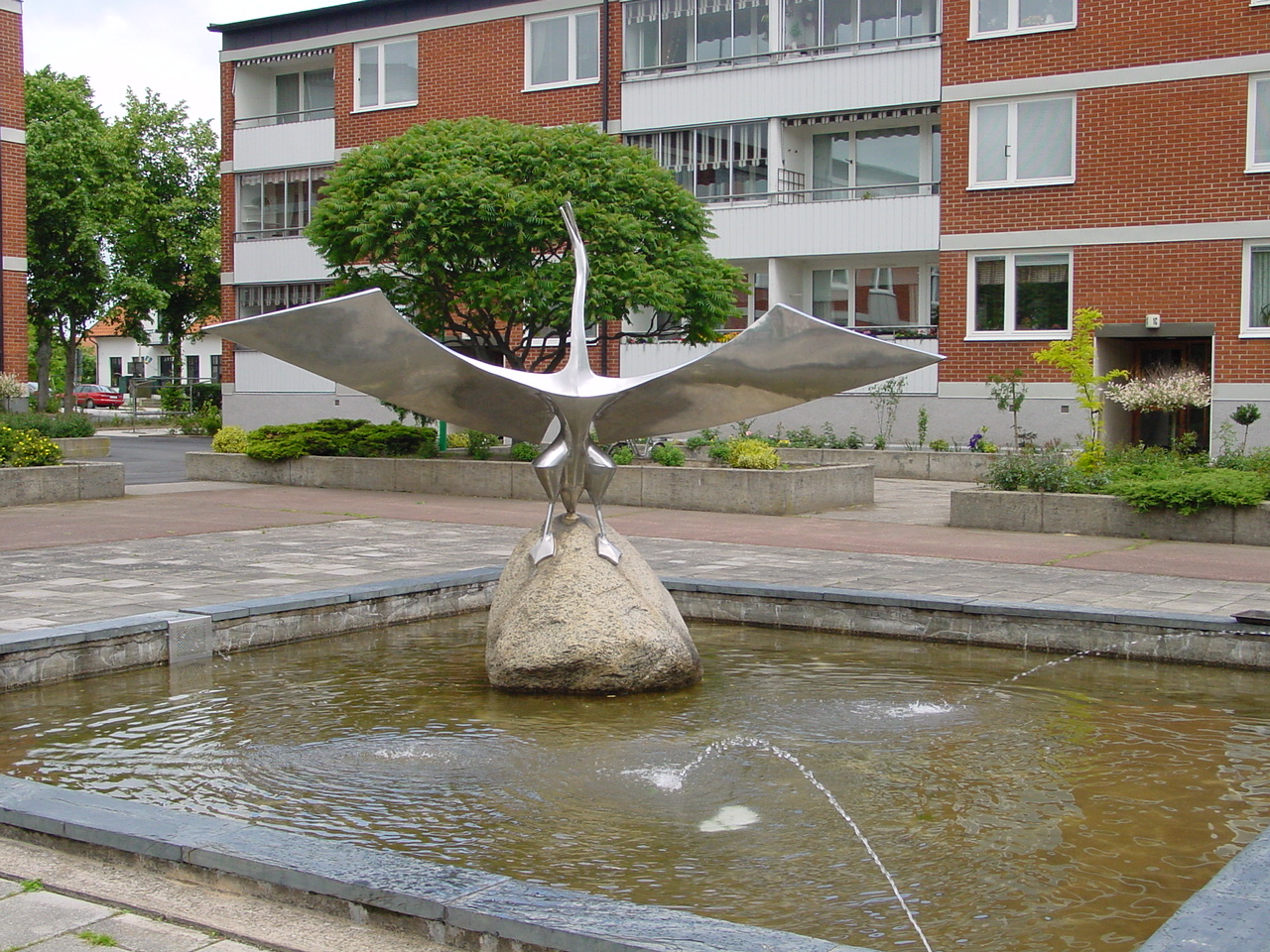
The flying goose statue by Nándor Wagner

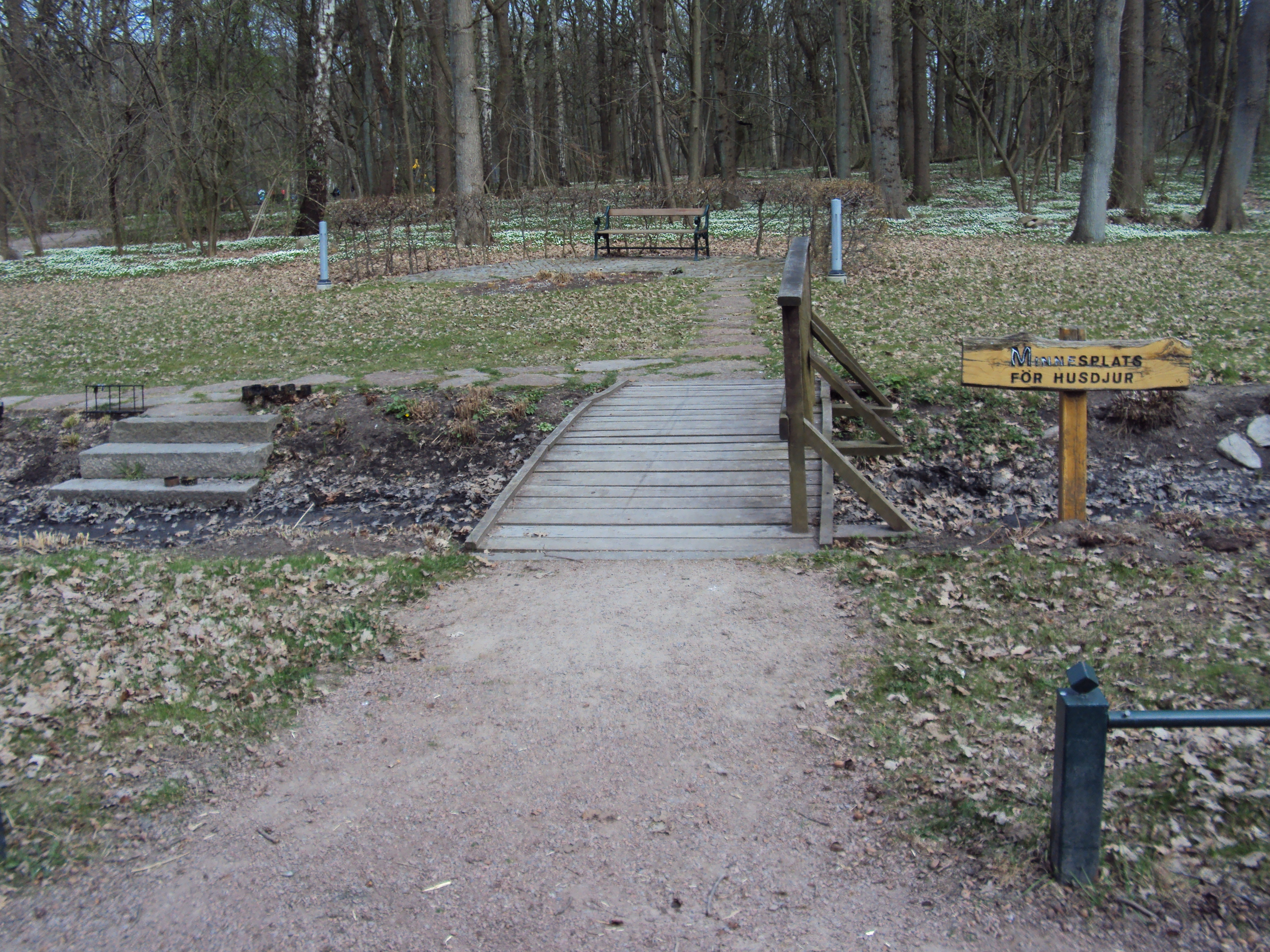
Graveyard for pets

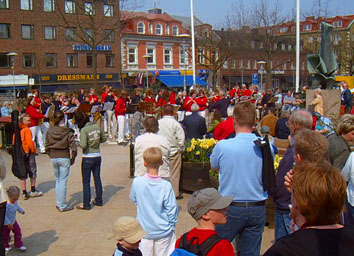
Music performance at the town square

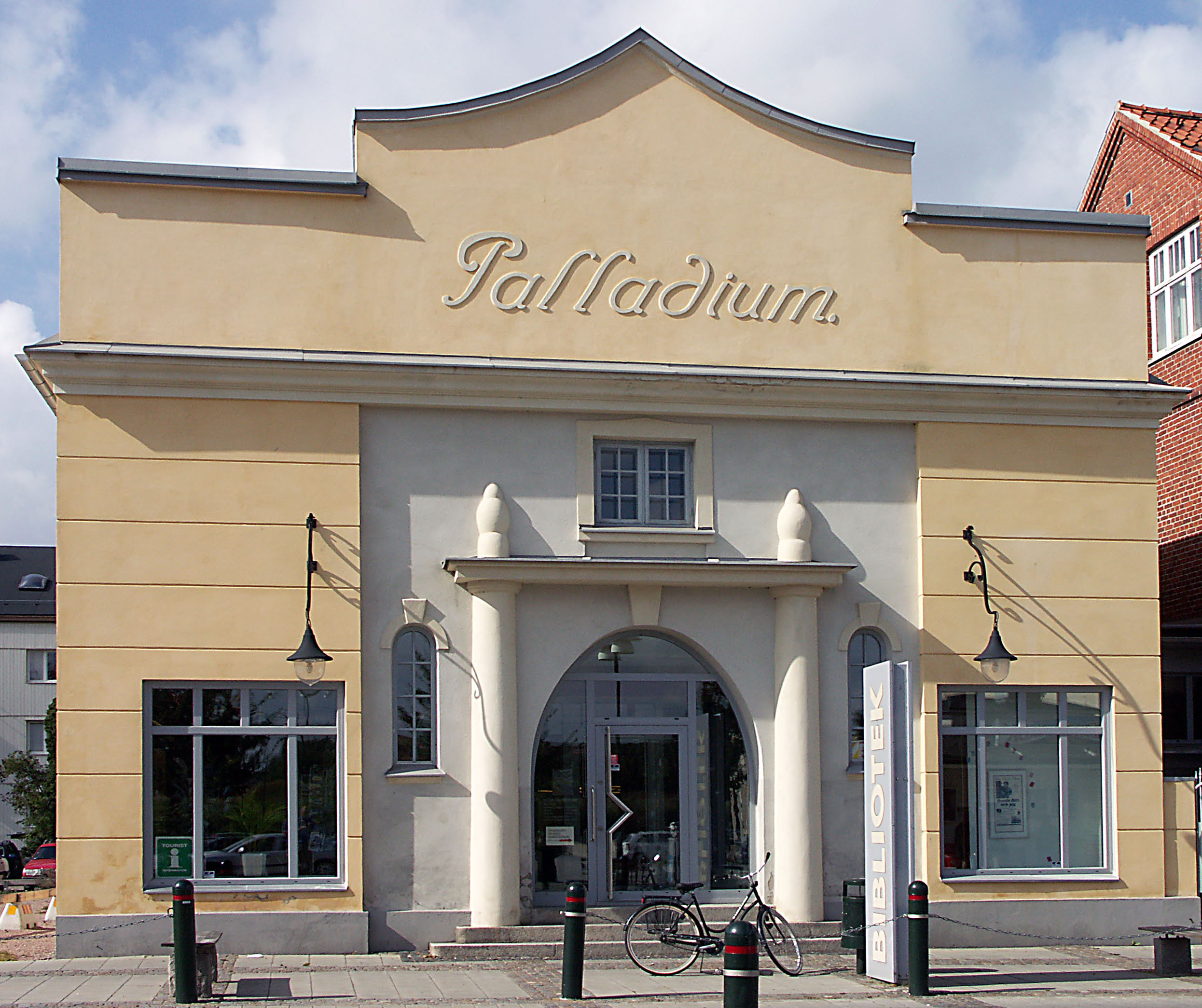
The library
