= Tadeusz Wieloch =

Swedish neurobiologist

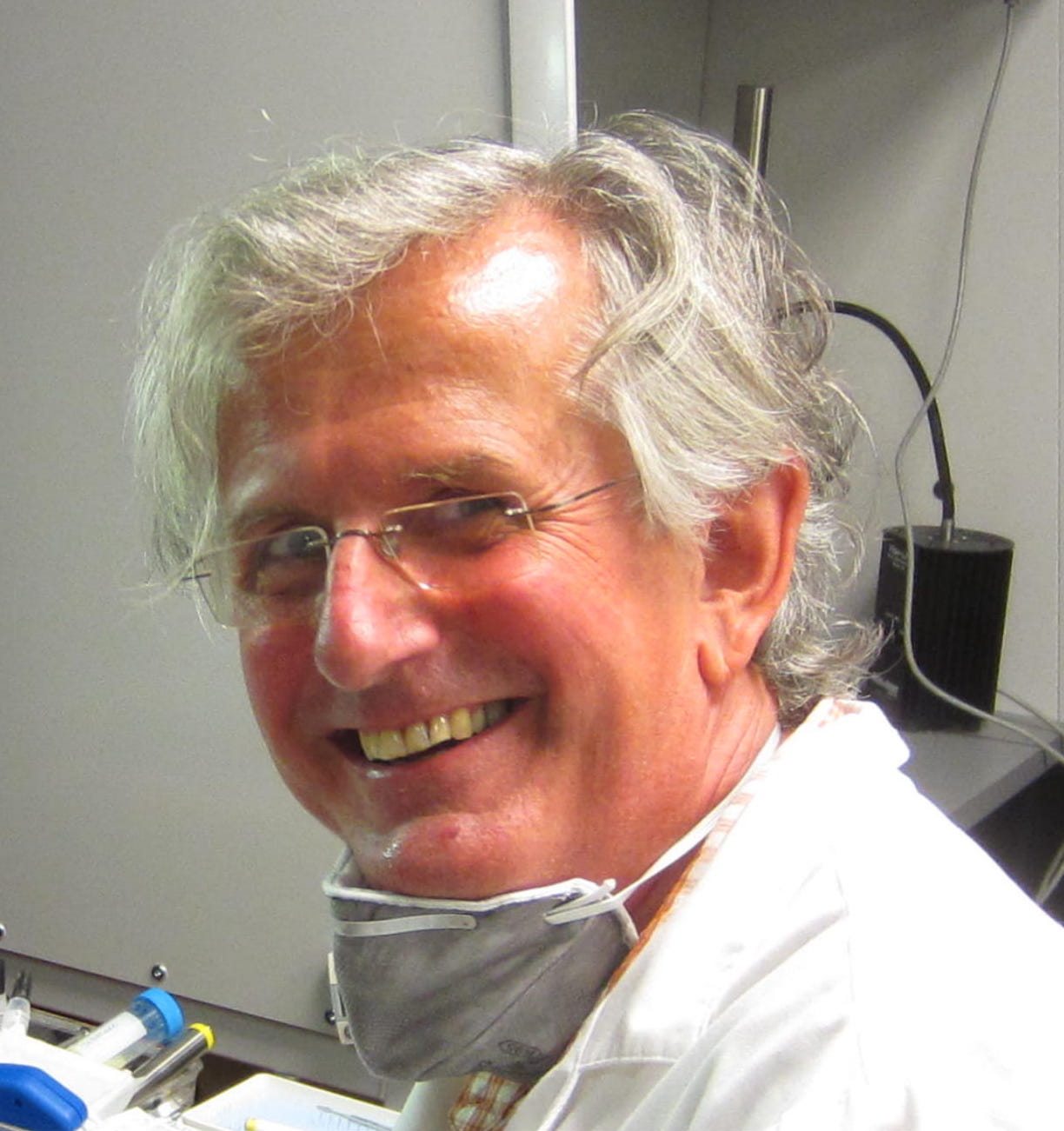
- Stanford, July 28, 2011
- Born: October 10, 1950 (age 75); Lund, Sweden
- Occupations: neuroscientist, entrepreneur
- Spouse: Marianne f. Bonow
- Children: Two

Tadeusz Wieloch (born October 10, 1950, Lund, Sweden) is a Swedish neuroscientist and entrepreneur, professor at Lund University, Sweden.

Tadeusz Wieloch, son of Krystyna and Antoni Wieloch, Polish immigrants to Sweden in 1945. He received his PhD in 1981 in medical- and physiological chemistry at Lund University. In 1993 he was promoted to professor of Neurobiology. Since 1981 his research aims to study mechanisms of brain injury and repair and to find new stroke therapies This research is conducted at the Wallenberg Neuroscience Center at Skåne University Hospital and Biomedical Center (BMC) in Lund.

Tadeusz Wieloch is a corresponding member of the Polish Academy of Sciences since 2005 and chaired the Brain Foundation's Scientific Committee from 2008 to 2014. He holds several patents and has founded three companies e.g. Sinntaxis AB in 2017.

Since 1969 he is member of Lunds University Male Voice Choir and Dubbelkvartetten Frida. He did his military service in the Swedish Armed Forces Language School and was an interpreter on the Russian submarine U137/S-363 during November 4–6, 1981, after the submarine ran aground in the Blekinge archipelago.
