= The Quartet That Split Up (1936 film) =

1936 film

- Directed by: Arne Bornebusch
- Written by: Gösta Sjöberg; Guido Valentin
- Based on: The Quartet That Split Up by Birger Sjöberg
- Starring: Carl Barcklind; Birgit Rosengren; Aino Taube
- Cinematography: Harald Berglund
- Edited by: Wic Kjellin
- Music by: Erik Baumann
- Production company: Europa Film
- Distributed by: Europa Film
- Release date: 19 October 1936
- Running time: 104 minutes
- Country: Sweden
- Language: Swedish

The Quartet That Split Up (Swedish: Kvartetten som sprängdes) is a 1936 Swedish comedy film directed by Arne Bornebusch and starring Carl Barcklind, Birgit Rosengren and Aino Taube. It is an adaptation of the 1924 novel of the same title by Birger Sjöberg, which was late remade as a 1950 film. The film's sets were designed by the art directors Bibi Lindström and Max Linder. It was shot at the Sundbyberg Studios of Europa Film in Stockholm.

== Synopsis ==
The members of a string quartet in a small Swedish town decided to speculate on the stock market with unexpected results.

== Cast ==
- Carl Barcklind as Karl Ludvig Sundelin
- Birgit Rosengren as Maj Andersson
- Nils Lundell as Anders Åvik
- Olga Andersson as Mrs. Selma Åvik
- Aino Taube as Märta Åvik
- Helle Winther as Edmund Åvik
- Sture Baude as Borg
- Åke Engfeldt as Ture Borg
- Helge Hagerman as Bengt 'Cello' Erlandsson
- Ivar Kåge as Teodor Planertz
- Dagmar Ebbesen as Aunt Klara

== Bibliography ==
- Goble, Alan. The Complete Index to Literary Sources in Film. Walter de Gruyter, 1999.
- Krawc, Alfred. International Directory of Cinematographers, Set- and Costume Designers in Film: Denmark, Finland, Norway, Sweden (from the beginnings to 1984). Saur, 1986.
- Wredlund, Bertil & Lindfors, Rolf. Långfilm i Sverige: 1930-1939. Proprius, 1983.
