= Med dej i mina armar =

1940 film

- Directed by: Hasse Ekman
- Written by: Hasse Ekman
- Produced by: Lorens Marmstedt, Terrafilm
- Starring: Edvin Adolphson; Karin Ekelund; Thor Modéen
- Music by: Kai Gullmar, Gunnar Malmström
- Release date: 1940
- Running time: 83 min
- Country: Sweden
- Language: Swedish

Med dej i mina armar (English: With You in My Arms) is a 1940 Swedish comedy film directed by Hasse Ekman.

== Plot summary ==
Millionaire Krister Dahl loses his memory when he is hit in the head by a golf ball one day. He later goes to a party and meets his ex-wife and immediately fall in love with her again, not knowing who she is. She does not know what to think about this sudden change in his behaviour. He is like a new man, only question is, who is he?

== Cast ==
- Edvin Adolphson as Krister Dahl
- Karin Ekelund as Barbro Brandt
- Thor Modéen as Vårby, Kristers valet
- Stig Järrel as Felix Tallgren
- Katie Rolfsen as Hilda, Barbros maid
- Marianne Aminoff as Magdalena Hildisan
- Carl-Gunnar Wingård as Svanberg, Lawyer
- Anna-Lisa Baude as Mrs. Svensson
- John Botvid as Alexander Danielsson, taxi driver
- Leif Amble-Næss as Sardini
- Mimi Pollak as Miss Carlander
- Eivor Engelbrektsson as Miss Svensson
- Nils Jacobsson as Troubador Höglund
- Åke Johansson as caddie
- Julia Cæsar as Krister's Second Secretary
- Emil Fjellström as Coachman
- Anna-Lisa Ryding as Connie Löfberg
- Ilse-Nore Tromm as Estern
- Sven-Olof Sandberg as Courtyard Singer
