= Tired Theodore =

Tired Theodore may refer to:

- Tired Theodore (1931 film), a French-Swedish film directed by Gustaf Edgren
- Tired Theodore (1936 film), a German film directed by Veit Harlan
- Tired Theodore (1945 film), a Swedish film directed by Anders Henrikson
- Tired Theodore (1957 film), a West German film directed by Géza von Cziffra
- Tired Theodore (1965 film), a West German TV film directed by Erich Neureuther
