= Gösta Grip =

Swedish actor (1904–1998)

- Born: 14 June 1904; Hedvig Eleonora Parish, Sweden
- Died: 26 March 1998 (aged 93); Stockholm, Sweden
- Occupation: Actor

Gösta Grip (14 June 1904 – 26 March 1998) was a Swedish actor.

Grip made his film debut in Gustav Edgren's Simon i Backabo in 1934, and came to participate in 30 film productions.

== Selected filmography ==
- Under False Flag (1935)
- John Ericsson, Victor of Hampton Roads (1937)
- Only One Night (1939)
- Bashful Anton (1940)
- Frestelse (1940)
- Kiss Her! (1940)
- Lasse-Maja (1941)
- Doctor Glas (1942)
- Dangerous Ways (1942)
- It Is My Music (1942)
