= 15th Berlin International Film Festival =

1965 film festival in West Berlin, Germany

- Festival poster
- Location: West Berlin, Germany
- Founded: 1951
- Awards: Golden Bear: Alphaville
- Festival date: 25 June – 6 July 1965
- Website: Website

Berlin International Film Festival chronology
- 16th 14th

The 15th annual Berlin International Film Festival was held from 25 June to 6 July 1965. The festival started selecting the jury members on its own rather than countries sending designated representatives.

The Golden Bear was awarded to Alphaville directed by Jean-Luc Godard.

== Jury ==
The following people were announced as being on the jury for the festival:

- John Gillett, British film critic - Jury President
- Alexander Kluge, West-German filmmaker, producer and writer
- Ely Azeredo, Brazilian film critic
- Monique Berger, French journalist and film critic
- Kyushiro Kusakabe, Japanese film critic
- Jerry Bresler, American film producer
- Karena Niehoff, West-German journalist and film critic
- Hansjürgen Pohland, West-German filmmaker and producer
- Hans-Dieter Roos, West-German film critic

== Official Sections ==
=== Main Competition ===
The following films were in competition for the Golden Bear award:

| English title | Original title | Director(s) | Production Country |
|---|---|---|---|
| Alphaville | Alphaville: une étrange aventure de Lemmy Caution | Jean-Luc Godard | France |
| The Art of Living | El arte de vivir | Julio Diamante | Spain |
| The Blood of the Walsungs | Wälsungenblut | Rolf Thiele | West Germany |
| Le Bonheur | | Agnès Varda | France |
| Cat Ballou | | Elliot Silverstein | United States |
| Charulata | চারুলতা | Satyajit Ray | India |
| Das Boot von Torreira | | Alfred Ehrhardt | West Germany |
| Een zondag op het eiland van de Grande Jatte | | Frans Weisz | Netherlands |
| The Knack ...and How to Get It | | Richard Lester | United Kingdom |
| Love 65 | Kärlek 65 | Bo Widerberg | Sweden |
| My Love and I | Kungsleden | Gunnar Höglund | Sweden |
| The Obsessed of Catule | Vereda de Salvação | Anselmo Duarte | Brazil |
| Pajarito Gómez | | Rodolfo Kuhn | Argentina |
| The Railrodder | | Gerald Potterton | Canada |
| The Reckless | Una bella grinta | Giuliano Montaldo | Italy |
| Repulsion | | Roman Polanski | United Kingdom |
| Secrets Behind the Wall | 壁の中の秘事 | Kōji Wakamatsu | Japan |
| Shakespeare Wallah | | James Ivory | United States |
| Six in Paris | Paris vu par... | Claude Chabrol, Jean Douchet, Jean-Luc Godard, Jean-Daniel Pollet, Eric Rohmer and Jean Rouch | France |
| Thomas the Impostor | Thomas l'imposteur | Georges Franju | France |
| To | | Palle Kjærulff-Schmidt | Denmark |
| Yeats Country | | Patrick Carey | Ireland |

== Official Awards ==
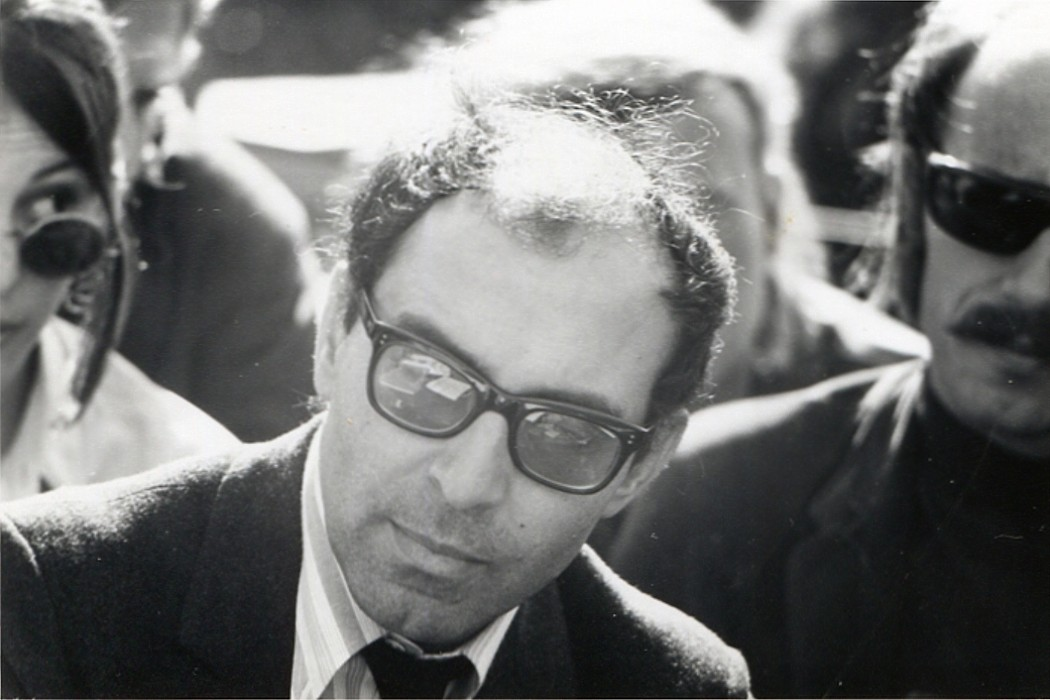
Jean-Luc Godard, winner of the Golden Bear at the event

The following prizes were awarded by the Jury:

- Golden Bear: Alphaville by Jean-Luc Godard
- Silver Bear for Best Director: Satyajit Ray for Charulata
- Silver Bear for Best Actress: Madhur Jaffrey for Shakespeare Wallah
- Silver Bear for Best Actor: Lee Marvin for Cat Ballou
- Silver Bear Extraordinary Jury Prize:
  - Repulsion by Roman Polanski
  - Le Bonheur by Agnès Varda
  - Special Mention: Walter Newman and Frank Pierson for Cat Ballou

== Independent Awards ==
=== Youth Film Award ===
- Best Feature Film Suitable for Young People: Pajarito Gómez by Rodolfo Kuhn
  - Honorable Mention:
    - Best Short Film Suitable for Young People: Das Boot von Torreira by Alfred Ehrhardt
    - Best Feature Film Suitable for Young People: Cat Ballou by Elliot Silverstein

=== FIPRESCI Award ===
- Repulsion by Roman Polanski
  - Honorable Mention: Love 65 by Bo Widerberg

=== OCIC Award ===
- Charulata by Satyajit Ray

=== UNICRIT Award ===
- Ninety Degrees in the Shade by Jiří Weiss
