= Art for Art's Sake (disambiguation) =

Art for art's sake is a slogan for art without any didactic, moral or utilitarian function.

Art for Art's Sake may refer to:

- Art for Art's Sake (film), a 1938 Swedish film
- "Art for Art's Sake" (song), a song by 10cc
- "Art for Art's Sake" (Daredevil: Born Again), an episode of Daredevil: Born Again
