= Our Boy =

1936 film

- Directed by: Arne Bornebusch
- Written by: Norbert Garai (play); Richard Arvay (play); Berndt Carlberg
- Starring: Edvard Persson; Nils Wahlbom; Tollie Zellman
- Cinematography: Harald Berglund
- Edited by: Wic Kjellin
- Music by: Erik Baumann; Evert Taube
- Production company: Europa Film
- Release date: 14 August 1936
- Running time: 98 minutes
- Country: Sweden
- Language: Swedish

Our Boy (Swedish: Våran pojke) is a 1936 Swedish drama film directed by Arne Bornebusch and starring Edvard Persson, Nils Wahlbom and Tollie Zellman.

The film's art direction was by Bibi Lindström.

== Cast ==
- Edvard Persson as Lars Blomquist
- Nils Wahlbom as Adolf Holmberg
- Tollie Zellman as Mrs. Evelina Holmberg
- Karin Ekelund as Lisa Bergman, maid
- Olle Granberg as Willie
- Nils Ekstam as Konrad Wallander
- Gösta Cederlund as Charlie Swenson
- Eric Gustafson as Gustav Mattson
- Carl Browallius as Judge
- Margit Rosengren as Okänd roll
- Bertil Alwars as Guest at Blomquist's wedding anniversary
- Astrid Bodin as Girl in Shop
- Helga Brofeldt as Gossip
- Julia Cæsar as Mrs. Karlsson
- Millan Fjellström as Shop assistant
- Bengt-Olof Granberg as Court assistant
- Lars Granberg as Sixten Holmberg
- Mary Hjelte as Guest at Blomquist's wedding anniversary
- Axel Isaksson as Janitor at the court
- Harald Svensson
- Lisa Wirström as Woman at the court
- Greta Zetterström as Greta

== Bibliography ==
- Qvist, Per Olov & von Bagh, Peter. Guide to the Cinema of Sweden and Finland. Greenwood Publishing Group, 2000.
