= Morianna =

1965 film

- Directed by: Arne Mattsson
- Written by: Per Wahlöö; Arne Mattsson
- Based on: Morianna by Jan Ekström
- Produced by: Inge Ivarson
- Starring: Anders Henrikson; Eva Dahlbeck; Elsa Prawitz
- Cinematography: Max Wilén
- Edited by: Lennart Wallén
- Music by: Georg Riedel
- Production company: Bison Film
- Distributed by: Bison Film
- Release date: 16 August 1965
- Running time: 100 minutes
- Country: Sweden
- Language: Swedish

Morianna (Swedish: Morianerna) is a 1965 Swedish erotic thriller film directed by Arne Mattsson and starring Anders Henrikson, Eva Dahlbeck and Elsa Prawitz. The film's sets were designed by the art director Per-Olav Sivertzen-Falk. It was based on the 1964 novel of the same title by Jan Ekström.

== Cast ==
- Anders Henrikson as Verner Vade
- Eva Dahlbeck as Anna Vade
- Heinz Hopf as Boris
- Elsa Prawitz as Agda Ahlgren
- Erik Hell as Ragnar Synnéus
- Tor Isedal as Valter Velin
- Lotte Tarp as Rita
- Julia Cæsar as Elderly Lady
- Elsa Ebbesen as Mrs. Durell
- Olle Andersson as Det. Supt. Durell
- Hans Bendrik as Det. Ass.
- Curt Ericson asJanitor
- Ella Henrikson as Monica Vade
- Walter Norman as Jonas Kellen
- Elisabeth Odén as Ms. Nilsson
- Ove Tjernberg as Bengt Ahlgren

== Reception ==
The magazine Barred gave the film a positive review, saying:

Swedish sexsational movie “Моrianna" is packed with nice juicy lovemaking scenes. The tale revolves around a Paul Getty-type millionaire and a troupe of hangers-on. The old gent is always threatening to disinherit the whole bunch. His wife by a late marriage is only 40 and of course has a lover! The top star in this flick is Danish sexpot “Lotte Tarp,” who plays the role of a very erotic maid. The story is a thriller, with just enough sex thrown in.

== Bibliography ==
- Qvist, Per Olov & von Bagh, Peter. Guide to the Cinema of Sweden and Finland. Greenwood Publishing Group, 2000.
