= Karin Ekelund =

Swedish actress

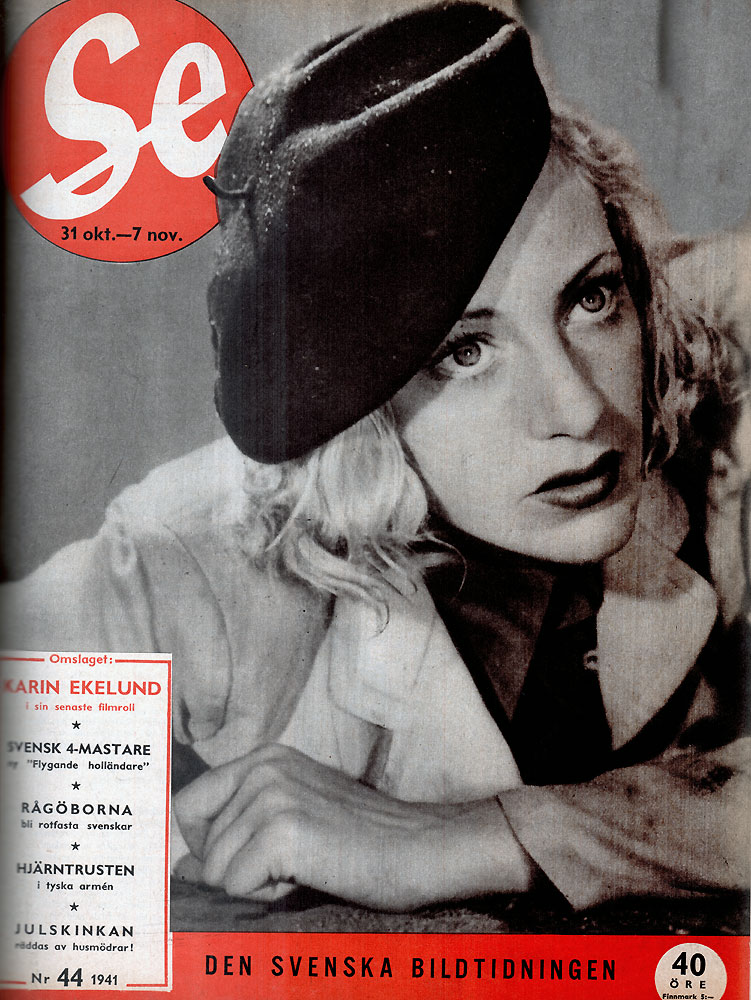
- Born: 26 May 1913; Ystad, Sweden
- Died: 21 December 1976 (aged 63); Stockholm, Sweden
- Resting place: Norra begravningsplatsen
- Occupation: Actor
- Years active: 1933–1955

Karin Ekelund (26 May 1913 – 21 December 1976) was a Swedish actress. She appeared in 29 films between 1933 and 1976. She was the first female radio producer in Sweden, producing, and later directing, for Sveriges Radio's Radio Theatre. She performed in mainly comedic films, although she did have a few serious roles to her name. She was one of the most famous actresses of her time and often drew large crowds of fans.

== Biography ==
Karin Ekelund was born in Ystad, Scania, Sweden, in 1913, the daughter of professor Sam Ekelund and Anna Lindström. She graduated from Palmgrenska samskolan at 17. Ekelund studied at the Royal Dramatic Training Academy from 1930 to 1933, after which she acted in both theatre and film. She worked at Vasateatern from 1934 to 1936, Oscarsteatern from 1938 to 1939 and the Malmö City Theatre from 1944.

Her big film breakthrough came as a comic actor in Hasse Ekman's Med dej i mina armar in 1940 and as a character actor in Anders Henrikson's A Crime in 1940.

In 1961 she was hired as the first female producer and director at the Radio Theatre and remained there for the rest of her life.

She was married twice, the first time in 1937 to dentist Rudolf Levin and the second time in 1951 to the director of Nordiska Kompaniet Ragnar Sachs.

Ekelund is buried at Norra begravningsplatsen in Stockholm.

== Selected filmography ==
- Marriageable Daughters (1933)
- People of Hälsingland (1933)
- Synnöve Solbakken (1934)
- Our Boy (1936)
- The People of Bergslagen (1937)
- Storm Over the Skerries (1938)
- A Crime (1940)
- Med dej i mina armar (1940)
- Lärarinna på vift (1941)
- Only a Woman (1941)
- Woman on Board (1941)
- Dangerous Ways (1942)
- Som du vill ha mej (1943)
- The Sixth Shot (1943)
- Blizzard (1944)
- Oss tjuvar emellan eller En burk ananas (1945)
- Dinner for Two (1947)
- Så tuktas kärleken (1955)
