= Resan till dej =

1953 film by Stig Olin

- Directed by: Stig Olin
- Written by: Stig Olin, Hasse Ekman
- Produced by: Lorens Marmstedt, Terrafilm
- Starring: Alice Babs; Sven Lindberg; Nils Hallberg; Karl-Arne Holmsten
- Music by: Sune Waldimir
- Release date: 19 December 1953
- Running time: 93 min
- Country: Sweden
- Language: Swedish

Resan till dej (English: The Journey to You) is a 1953 Swedish comedy film directed by Stig Olin.

== Plot summary ==
The young and happy couple Emil and Gun have been married for five years but are still saving money for their honeymoon. One day Gun happens to sing on a radio show, successfully and signs a contract with a gramophone company, fame and fortune is soon hers. But the marriage is strained by her career and her touring when Emil feels alone and abandoned at home.

== Cast ==
- Alice Babs as Gunborg "Gun" Karlsson
- Sven Lindberg as Emil "Mille" Larsson/speaker
- Anders Henrikson as Vilhelm "Ville" Karlsson
- Hjördis Petterson as Dagmar Vikström
- Nils Hallberg as Berra Gustavsson
- Karl-Arne Holmsten as Staffan Bendix
- Stig Järrel as Bruno Vikström
- Douglas Håge as Lundberg
- Ulla Sjöblom as Maudan
- Sigge Fürst as himself, show host for "Familjelördag"
- Dagmar Olsson as Mrs. Bertils, journalist at "Hemmet och vi"
- Rune Halvarsson as Lyrics Writer
- Jussi Björling as himself, guest at "Familjelördag"
