= Kvartetten som sprängdes =

1924 novel by Birger Sjöberg

- Aldus / Bonniers (1968 edition)
- Author: Birger Sjöberg
- Language: Swedish
- Published: 1924
- Publication place: Sweden

Kvartetten som sprängdes is a 1924 novel by Swedish author Birger Sjöberg.

A film adaption was made by Arne Bornebusch in 1936, another in 1950 by Gustaf Molander and one by Hans Alfredson in 1973. It was also made into a graphic novel by Malin Biller in 2015.
