= Harald Tandrup =

Danish writer

Harald Tandrup (31 January 1874 in Copenhagen – 10 May 1964) was a Danish writer. He used the pseudonyms Claus Colding or Klavs Kolding.

His first novel was entitled Ain-Mokra and appeared 1900. He also wrote Reluctant Prophet (first U.S. edition in 1939).

His novella En Eneste Natt was adapted into the Swedish 1939 film En Enda Nataa, starring Ingrid Bergman.

In 1946 he was excluded from the Danish Writer's Association (Danske Dramatikeres Forbund), possibly for his Nazi collaboration. He had written for a Nazi newspaper and "scandalously" asserted that the Soviet Army had perpetrated the Katyn massacre, rather than the popular assumption in the 1940s that the Nazis were responsible; decades later he was proven correct.
