= Dinner for Two (1947 film) =

1947 film

- Directed by: Ragnar Arvedson
- Written by: Jan Molander
- Based on: Métier de femme by André-Paul Antoine
- Produced by: Lorens Marmstedt
- Starring: Edvin Adolphson; Karin Ekelund; Gaby Stenberg
- Cinematography: Hilding Bladh; Felix Forsman
- Edited by: Lennart Wallén
- Music by: Fred Adison; Bruno Coquatrix; Bosse Rosendahl
- Production company: Terrafilm
- Distributed by: Terrafilm
- Release date: 15 February 1947
- Running time: 88 minutes
- Country: Sweden
- Language: Swedish

Dinner for Two (Swedish: Supé för två) is a 1947 Swedish romantic comedy film directed by Ragnar Arvedson and starring Edvin Adolphson, Karin Ekelund and Gaby Stenberg. It was shot at the Centrumateljéerna Studios in Stockholm. Location shooting took place around Cannes and Nice. The film's sets were designed by the art director Hannu Leminen. It was based on a play by André-Paul Antoine, which had previously been adapted into the 1943 French film The Inevitable Monsieur Dubois.

== Synopsis ==
Louise Mareuil runs a luxury perfume business on the French Riviera. While driving in her car one day she knocks down a motorcyclist who turns out to be a commercial artist. He rapidly turns her life upside down.

== Cast ==
- Edvin Adolphson as Claude Dubois
- Karin Ekelund as Louise Mareuil
- Gaby Stenberg as Jacqueline
- Ragnar Arvedson as Verdier
- Douglas Håge as Mouche
- Mimi Pollak as Sophie
- Josua Bengtson as Concierge
- Albert Ståhl as Cashier
- Eric Fröling as Valet
- Börje Nyberg as Mechanic
- Ingrid Aréhn as Juliette
- Ann-Marie Wiman as Saleswoman
- Bert Sorbon as Waiter

== Bibliography ==
- Qvist, Per Olov & von Bagh, Peter. Guide to the Cinema of Sweden and Finland. Greenwood Publishing Group, 2000.
