= I Am with You (1948 film) =

1948 film

- Directed by: Gösta Stevens
- Written by: Rune Lindström; Gösta Stevens
- Starring: Victor Sjöström; Rune Lindström; Nils Dahlgren
- Cinematography: Åke Dahlqvist
- Edited by: Oscar Rosander
- Music by: John Hult
- Production company: Studio Film
- Distributed by: Svensk Filmindustri
- Release date: 5 January 1948
- Running time: 95 minutes
- Country: Sweden
- Language: Swedish

I Am with You (Swedish: Jag är med eder...) is a 1948 Swedish drama film directed by Gösta Stevens and starring Victor Sjöström, Rune Lindström and Nils Dahlgren. It was shot at the Råsunda Studios in Stockholm. The film's sets were designed by the art director Nils Svenwall. Location shooting took place around Victoria Falls and the Mberengwa District. It received backing from the Church of Sweden and was picked up for American distribution the following year.

== Synopsis ==
Helge Tellberg leaves Sweden with his wife and young son to become a missionary in Southern Rhodesia.

== Cast ==
- Victor Sjöström as Vicar
- Rune Lindström as Helge Tellberg
- Carin Cederström as Carin
- Lars Lindström as Lasse
- Nils Dahlgren as Henrik Ljung
- Carl Ström as Bishop
- Åke Fridell as Carlsson
- Signe Lundberg-Settergren as Maria
- Erik Forslund as Old Man
- Lena Mbuisa as Estina, wife of Esau
- Pedro Tapareza as Esau

== Bibliography ==
- Pensel, Hans. Seastrom and Stiller in Hollywood: Two Swedish Directors in Silent American Films 1921-1930. Vantage Press, 1969.
- Suit, Kenneth. James Friedrich and Cathedral Films: The Independent Religious Cinema of the Evangelist of Hollywood, 1939-1966. Lexington Books, 2017.
