= Med livet som insats =

1940 film

- Film poster
- Directed by: Alf Sjöberg
- Written by: Runar Schildt; Alf Sjöberg
- Starring: Aino Taube
- Cinematography: Harald Berglund
- Release date: 1 January 1940
- Running time: 81 minutes
- Country: Sweden
- Language: Swedish

Med livet som insats is a 1940 Swedish drama film directed by Alf Sjöberg.

== Cast ==
- Aino Taube as Wanda
- Åke Ohberg as John
- Anders Henrikson as Max (as Anders Henriksson)
- Gösta Cederlund as Baker
- Holger Löwenadler as Miller
- Eivor Landström as Eva
- Hampe Faustman as Freedom fighter (as Erik Faustman)
- Bengt Ekerot as Freedom fighter
- Torsten Hillberg as Colonel
- Ernst Brunman as Innkeeper
- Frithiof Bjärne as Captain (as Fritjof Bjärne)
