= Only One Night (1939 film) =

1939 film

- Directed by: Gustaf Molander
- Written by: Harald Tandrup (novel); Gösta Stevens; Harald Tandrup
- Starring: Ingrid Bergman; Edvin Adolphson; Aino Taube
- Cinematography: Elner Åkesson; Ferenc Zádori
- Edited by: Oscar Rosander
- Music by: Eric Bengtson; Jules Sylvain
- Production company: Svensk Filmindustri
- Distributed by: Svensk Filmindustri
- Release date: 20 February 1939
- Running time: 91 minutes
- Country: Sweden
- Language: Swedish

Only One Night (Swedish: En enda natt) is a 1939 Swedish romantic drama film directed by Gustaf Molander and starring Ingrid Bergman, Edvin Adolphson and Aino Taube. Bergman agreed to appear in the film in exchange for being given the lead role she had sought in A Woman's Face the previous year.

== Plot ==
Valdemar Moreaux works as a carnival barker who also helps manage the show for the widowed owner Helga Martensson, with whom he has been living. When Martensson suggests that they get married, however, he describes himself as a "rootless" free spirit who might move on to something else.

The show has been set up on the large estate of Magnus von Brede, a former army colonel. Observing the carnival from a distance with his ward, Eva Beckman, he remarks that Valdemar reminds him of someone and soon invites the younger man to his mansion. Von Brede quickly forgives Valdemar and the carnival for not asking permission to use his property, but also is confirmed in his belief that Valdemar might be his illegitimate son, conceived years ago during a one-night stand. Seeing qualities that he likes in this apparent son, he offers Valdemar a job managing his stable of prize horses without telling him about their relationship. Eva, currently working on her dissertation a degree in Philosophy, is amused by her guardian's interests but otherwise confesses no particular attraction to Valdemar, who accepts the job, leaving behind a sad and angry Martensson.

Arriving at the mansion, Valdemar is surprised to learn that he will be living not in the stable but in one of the house's lavish guest suites. Soon, though, von Brede reveals Valdemar's relationship to him. Eva is still interested in this new resident, but remains emotionally aloof. As time passes, though, the colonel takes charge of giving the young man a crash course in culture, speech, and etiquette that will be necessary for this future heir and tries to encourage a romantic relationship between Valdemar and Eva. As they travel together for further culture and education Valdemar and Eva become closer but agree to remain only as friends. Eventually, though, the couple become even closer.

In spite of his unsought advantages, Valdemar cannot quite shake his feeling of rootlessness, and he visits Martensson who is now working for another traveling circus. Although she would clearly like to have him back, she is still angry. That rejection confirms Valdemar's intention to propose marriage to Eva, who gladly accepts, and the couple announce the happy news to von Brede. However, one night after an engagement party, the couple are about to retire to their separate bedrooms. The drunken Valdemar eases his way into Eva's bedroom, which she handles at first with humor, but then fights him off and denounces his "filthy" behavior.

The engagement now broken, Valdemar leaves von Brede and returns to the circus and Martensson. In an ending scene, set some time later, these two are now happily married, with a child.

== Cast ==
- Ingrid Bergman as Eva Beckman
- Edvin Adolphson as Valdemar Moreaux
- Aino Taube as Helga Mårtensson
- Olof Sandborg as Magnus von Brede
- Erik 'Bullen' Berglund as Hagberg
- Marianne Löfgren as Rosa
- Magnus Kesster as Olsson
- Ragna Breda as Mrs. Krogh (uncredited)

== Production and release ==
Bergman agreed to appear in the film in exchange for being given the lead role she had sought in A Woman's Face the previous year. The actress was, however, not satifisfied with what she thought was yet another ingénue role.

It is one of her last Swedish films before she moved to the United States. It was released in Sweden on February, 20, 1939.

== Reception and legacy ==
The film was included in the Criterion Channel collection.

In 2015, Jon Asp, on the website the Swedish Film Institute, stated: "One could [...] read the film as a somewhat more modern, if only marginally less static, depiction of morality, where the working class makes sure to have fun both inside and outside of marriage, while the upper class locks themselves inside cold walls regardless."

== Bibliography ==
- Soila, Tytti. The Cinema of Scandinavia. Wallflower Press, 2005.
