= Mimi Pollak =

Swedish actress (1903–1999)

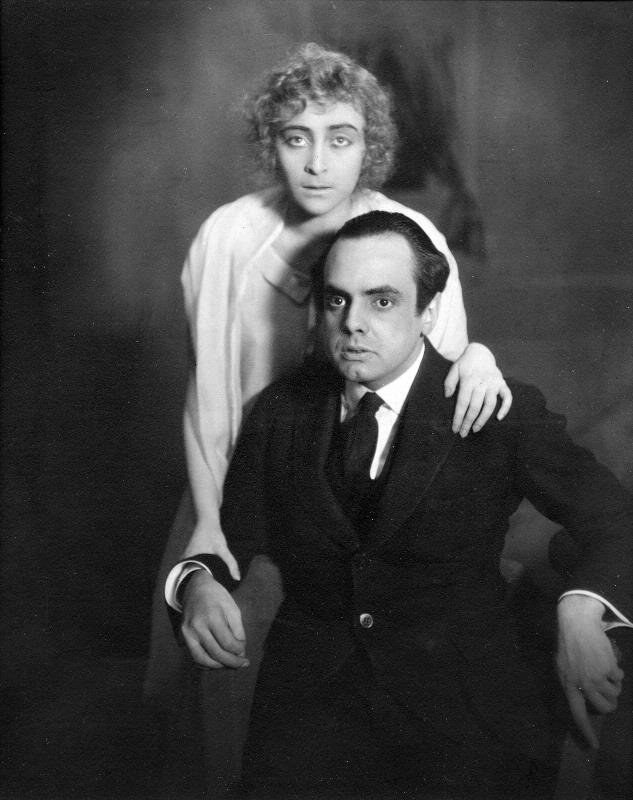
- Mimi Pollak and Torsten Bergström at Helsingborg City Theatre in 1924
- Born: Maria Helena Pollak; 9 April 1903; Karlstad, Sweden
- Died: 11 August 1999 (aged 96); Stockholm, Sweden
- Other names: Mimmi Pollak, Mimi Pollack, Mimmi Pollack
- Occupations: Actress, director
- Years active: 1922–1991
- Spouse: Nils Lundell (1927–1938)

Maria Helena "Mimi" Pollak (9 April 1903 – 11 August 1999) was a Swedish actress and theatre director.

== Biography ==
Pollak was born in Karlstad, Värmland, to Austrian-Jewish parents and was trained in the performing arts at the prestigious Royal Dramatic Training Academy in Stockholm from 1922 to 1924.

Pollak worked in the 1920s and 1930s as a film actress, and as a stage actress, mainly at the Blanche Theatre in Stockholm and at the Helsingborg City Theatre. She returned as an actress to the Royal Dramatic Theatre in Stockholm in 1942.

In 1948, Pollak became the first contracted female director at the Royal Dramatic Theatre with the production of Jean Genet's Jungfruleken (Les Bonnes/The Maids), starring Anita Björk and Maj-Britt Nilsson in the leads. Pollak became a successful director at the Royal Dramatic Theatre and staged altogether 60 plays at the national stage over the years.

After her 1922 debut in the film Amatörfilmen (The Amateur Film), she appeared in about 30 film and TV productions. Notable film roles are her supporting parts in Schamyl Bauman's film comedy Skolka skolan (Skip School, 1949), in Vilgot Sjöman's Klänningen (The Dress, 1964), as the piano teacher in Ingmar Bergman's Höstsonaten (Autumn Sonata, 1978) starring Ingrid Bergman, in Ingenjör Andrées luftfärd (Flight of the Eagle, 1982) starring Max von Sydow and directed by Jan Troell, and in the popular Swedish TV mystery Agnes Cecilia – en sällsam historia (Agnes Cecilia — A Strange Story, 1991) adapted from the successful books by Maria Gripe.

She retired in 1975, but made a stage comeback in 1991, aged 87, in Anton Chekhov's Uncle Vanya.

She was sometimes credited as Mimmi Pollak, Mimi Pollack or Mimmi Pollack.

== Personal life ==
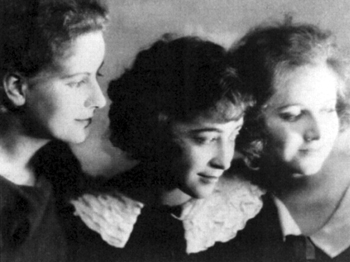
Greta Garbo, Mimi Pollak and Vera Schmiterlöw, students at the Royal Dramatic Training Academy (1922/1923)

Pollak attended the Royal Dramatic Training Academy in Stockholm with fellow actress Greta Garbo from 1922 to 1924. Garbo moved to the US in 1925, but they maintained contact for over 60 years. Their relationship and letters are portrayed (published in parts) in the Swedish book Djävla älskade unge! (Bloody Beloved Kid), written by Tin Andersén Axell (2005), and in Garbo's personal writings, released in Sweden the same year.

Pollak was married to Swedish actor Nils Lundell (1889–1943) from 1927 to 1938, and together they had a son.

== Selected filmography ==
- 1991 – Agnes Cecilia – en sällsam historia
- 1986 – Amorosa
- 1985 – August Strindberg ett liv (TV)
- 1982 – The Flight of the Eagle (Ingenjör Andrées luftfärd)
- 1978 – Autumn Sonata (Höstsonaten)
- 1979 – I frid och värdighet
- 1979 – Christopher's House
- 1971 – Emil i Lönneberga
- 1965 – Nightmare
- 1964 – The Dress
- 1956 – Rätten att älska
- 1955 – Mord, lilla vän
- 1951 – Sommarlek
- 1949 – Playing Truant
- 1949 – Bara en mor (a.k.a. Only A Mother)
- 1949 – The Street
- 1947 – Den långa vägen
- 1947 – Dinner for Two
- 1942 – Lågor i dunklet
- 1942 – We House Slaves
- 1941 – The Ghost Reporter
- 1940 – Med dej i mina armar
- 1940 One, But a Lion!
- 1938 – The Great Love
- 1926 – Sven Klingas levnadsöde
- 1923 – Andersson, Pettersson och Lundström
- 1922 – Amatörfilmen
