= Helge Hagerman =

Swedish actor

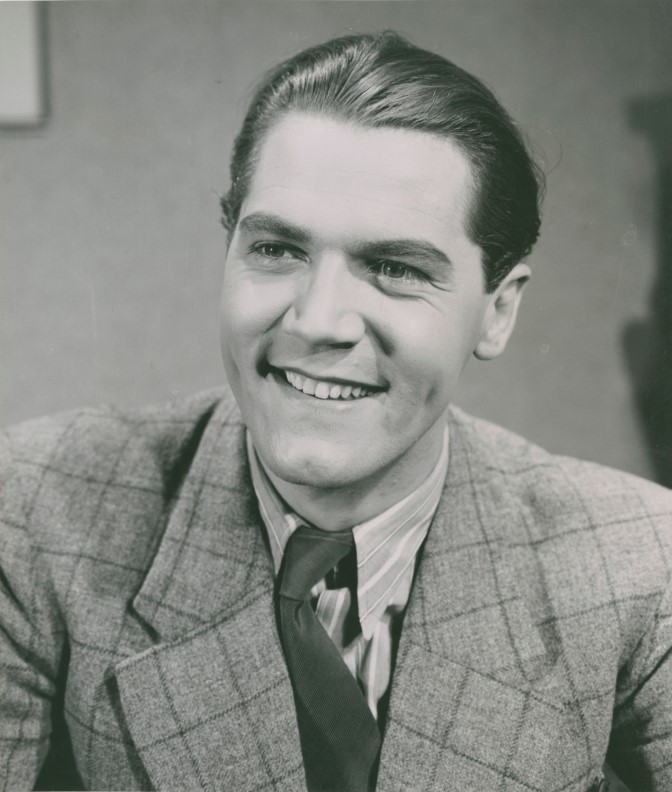
- Born: 19 May 1910; Stockholm, Sweden
- Died: 25 November 1995 (aged 85); Stockholm, Sweden
- Occupations: Actor, film producer
- Years active: 1933–1989

Helge Hagerman (19 May 1910 – 25 November 1995) was a Swedish actor and film producer. He appeared in more than 40 films between 1933 and 1989.

== Selected filmography ==
- His Life's Match (1932)
- Raggen (1936)
- The Quartet That Split Up (1936)
- Johan Ulfstjerna (1936)
- Sun Over Sweden (1938)
- Wanted (1939)
- The Talk of the Town (1941)
- The Old Clock at Ronneberga (1944)
- Thirst (1949)
- This Can't Happen Here (1950)
- The Quartet That Split Up (1950)
- Beef and the Banana (1951)
- Dance, My Doll (1953)
- Wild Birds (1955)
- Violence (1955)
- Darling of Mine (1955)
- The Light from Lund (1955)
- The Unicorn (1955)
- The Stranger from the Sky (1956)
- Encounters in the Twilight (1957)
- Seventeen Years Old (1957)
- Night Light (1957)
- A Dreamer's Journey (1957)
- A Goat in the Garden (1958)
- Laila (1958)
- Crime in Paradise (1959)
- Agaton Sax and the Byköpings Village Festival (1976)
