= The Bjorck Family =

1940 film

- Directed by: Anders Henrikson
- Written by: Ragnar Hyltén-Cavallius; Alice Svensk
- Produced by: Lorens Marmstedt
- Starring: Olof Winnerstrand; Frida Winnerstrand; Birgitta Arman
- Cinematography: Ernst Westerberg
- Edited by: Rolf Husberg
- Music by: Eskil Eckert-Lundin; Thore Ehrling
- Production company: Terrafilm
- Distributed by: Terrafilm
- Release date: 21 January 1940
- Running time: 98 minutes
- Country: Sweden
- Language: Swedish

The Bjorck Family (Swedish: Familjen Björck) is a 1940 Swedish comedy film directed by Anders Henrikson and starring Olof Winnerstrand, Frida Winnerstrand and Birgitta Arman. It was shot at the Centrumateljéerna Studios in Stockholm. The film's sets were designed by the art director Arthur Spjuth. It was based on a radio show of the same name that ran from 1936 to 1943.

== Synopsis ==
The Björck family are a respectable middle-class Stockholm household. However the daughter Greta is showing interest in an unsuitable boyfriend while ignoring a more clean-cut suitor while her father is being pursued by the seductive Astrid Holten.

== Cast ==
- Olof Winnerstrand as Ingeniör Björck
- Frida Winnerstrand as Fru Björck
- Birgitta Arman as Greta, deras dotter
- Åke Johansson as Ville, deras son
- Margit Manstad as Astrid Holten
- Carin Swensson as Hulda
- Gull Natorp as Tant Inga
- Carl-Axel Hallgren as Bertil
- Ulf Westman as Börje Schack
- Carl-Gunnar Wingård as Karlgren
- Anna-Lisa Baude as Fröken Widén
- Artur Rolén as Edvin Holten
- Gerda Björne as Irma
- Åke Claesson as Karl
- Julie Bernby as Miss Engström
- Georg Funkquist as Ladies' Hairdresser
- Harry Roeck Hansen as Algot
- Viran Rydkvist as Woman at Dog Show
- Frithiof Bjärne as Doorman at Scala

== Bibliography ==
- Qvist, Per Olov & von Bagh, Peter. Guide to the Cinema of Sweden and Finland. Greenwood Publishing Group, 2000.
