= Carl Browallius =

Swedish actor (1868–1944)

- Born: Carl Andersson; 7 June 1868; Uppsala, Sweden
- Died: 7 November 1944 (aged 76); Stockholm, Sweden
- Occupation: Actor
- Years active: 1910-1942 (film)

Carl Browallius (born Carl Andersson; 7 June 1868 – 7 November 1944) was a Swedish stage and film actor.

== Selected filmography ==
- His Lordship's Last Will (1919)
- Karin Daughter of Ingmar (1920)
- The Eyes of Love (1922)
- Thomas Graal's Ward (1922)
- Anna-Clara and Her Brothers (1923)
- The Counts at Svansta (1924)
- Life in the Country (1924)
- Her Little Majesty (1925)
- Kalle Utter (1925)
- Ingmar's Inheritance (1925)
- The Lady of the Camellias (1925)
- A Perfect Gentleman (1927)
- Sin (1928)
- Ocean Breakers (1935)
- Our Boy (1936)
- He, She and the Money (1936)
- Poor Millionaires (1936)
- Adventure (1936)
- The Andersson Family (1937)
- Sara Learns Manners (1937)
- Sun Over Sweden (1938)
- Wanted (1939)
- The People of Högbogården (1939)
- We at Solglantan (1939)

== Bibliography ==
- Goble, Alan. The Complete Index to Literary Sources in Film. Walter de Gruyter, 1999.
