= A Crime (1940 film) =

1940 film

- Directed by: Anders Henrikson
- Written by: Anders Henrikson; Bengt Idestam-Almquist; Carlo Keil-Möller
- Based on: A Crime by Sigfrid Siwertz
- Produced by: Lorens Marmstedt
- Starring: Edvin Adolphson; Karin Ekelund; Carl Barcklind
- Cinematography: Hilding Bladh
- Edited by: Rolf Husberg
- Music by: Gunnar Malmström; Bosse Rosendahl
- Production company: Terrafilm
- Distributed by: Terrafilm
- Release date: 22 August 1940
- Running time: 92 minutes
- Country: Sweden
- Language: Swedish

A Crime (Swedish: Ett brott) is a 1940 Swedish crime drama film directed by Anders Henrikson and starring Edvin Adolphson, Karin Ekelund and Carl Barcklind. It was shot at the Centrumateljéerna Studios in Stockholm and on location in the city. The film's sets were designed by the art director Arthur Spjuth. It was adapted from a 1933 play of the same title by Sigfrid Siwertz, itself inspired by the real-life Von Sydow murders case.

== Cast ==
- Edvin Adolphson as Rutger von Degerfelt
- Karin Ekelund as Maud, Rutger's Wife
- Carl Barcklind as Andreas von Degerfelt
- Anders Henrikson as Hans von Degerfelt
- Ziri-Gun Eriksson as Maria Gilljams
- Gösta Cederlund as Inspector Lilja
- Håkan Westergren as Bror Risberg
- Sigurd Wallén as Hugo von Degerfelt
- Dagmar Ebbesen as Mrs. Sofia Duner
- Einar Axelsson as Dr. Bernhard Gilljams
- Ulla Sorbon as Lisa Waldemars
- Åke Claesson as Dr. Forenius
- Hilda Borgström as Miss Alma Furuvik
- Gösta Bodin as Mr. Duner
- Karin Alexandersson as Kristin
- Ivar Kåge as Rosensköld
- Sten Hedlund as Redlund
- Gösta Hillberg as Prison Guard
- Oscar Åberg as Berggren
- Tord Bernheim as Man in the garage

== Bibliography ==
- Qvist, Per Olov & von Bagh, Peter. Guide to the Cinema of Sweden and Finland. Greenwood Publishing Group, 2000.
