= Frida Winnerstrand =

Swedish actress

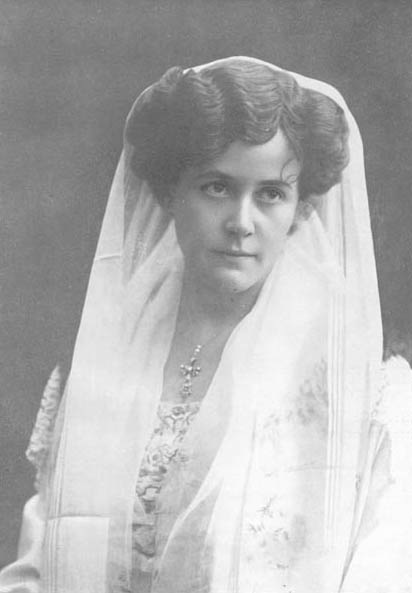
- Winnerstrand in 1908.
- Born: Karolina Alfrida Kumlin; 23 January 1881; Lövsta, Järfälla, Sweden
- Died: 1 December 1943 (aged 62); Stockholm, Sweden
- Occupation: Actress
- Years active: 1901–1943
- Spouse: Olof Winnerstrand (m. 1906–1943)

Karolina Alfrida ("Frida") Winnerstrand, née Kumlin (23 January 1881 – 1 December 1943) was a Swedish actress.

== Biography ==
Born in Lövsta, Järfälla, Stockholm, Frida Winnerstrand made her debut 1896 in the Anna Lundbergs Theatre Company and later studied acting at the Royal Dramatic Training Academy in Stockholm 1900–1901. Later she joined the Hillberg Company (1901–02) and the Selander Company (1902–03) on tour. Performed at Albert Ranft's theatre, old Östermalmsteatern 1903, at the Swedish Theatre 1904 and from 1905 to 1919 at Vasateatern. From 1919 to her death in 1943 she worked at the Royal Dramatic Theatre in Stockholm where some of her most notable parts were as Lady Chiltern in Oscar Wildes An Ideal Husband (1919), Adelaide in the play Johan Ulfstjerna, Julia Swedenhielm in Hjalmar Bergmans Swedenhielms (1925), Essie Miller in Eugene O'Neills Ah, Wilderness! (1935–36), Mrs Heyst in Strindbergs Easter and as Mor i Falla in Selma Lagerlöfs Kejsarn av Portugallien (The Emperor of Portugal) (1939).

Frida Winnerstrand made her film debut in 1920 in Pauline Brunius silent short film De läckra skaldjuren, and played altogether 10 parts on film (only three talkies). She was since 1906 married to Swedish actor Olof Winnerstrand. They often appeared together on stage and played opposite each other in the popular long-running radio series Familjen Björck (The Björck Family), as Mr and Mrs Björck (that aired in Swedish Radio, SR, between 1936 and 1943), and later also in the popular film adaption of the series, shot in 1940.

Winnerstrand died of cancer in 1943.

== Selected filmography ==
- De läckra skaldjuren (1920)
- Adventure (1936)
- Thunder and Lightning (1938)
- The Bjorck Family (1940)
