= We're All Errand Boys =

1941 film

- Directed by: Ivar Johansson
- Written by: Hugo Bolander; Harry Iseborg
- Starring: Åke Söderblom; Rune Halvarsson; Gunnar Höglund
- Cinematography: Åke Dahlqvist
- Edited by: Oscar Rosander
- Music by: Gunnar Johansson
- Production company: Fribergs Filmbyrå
- Distributed by: Svensk Filmindustri
- Release date: 4 January 1941
- Running time: 85 minutes
- Country: Sweden
- Language: Swedish

We're All Errand Boys (Swedish: Springpojkar är vi allihopa!) is a 1941 Swedish comedy film directed by Ivar Johansson and starring Åke Söderblom, Rune Halvarsson and Gunnar Höglund. It was shot at the Råsunda Studios in Stockholm. The film's sets were designed by the art director Arne Åkermark. Location shooting took place in Stockholm.

== Synopsis ==
Two meat wholesaler firms engage in cutthroat rivalry to land a large contract. Additionally, a worker at one of the firms is smitten by the daughter of the manager of the competing company.

== Cast ==
- Åke Söderblom as Gugge
- Rune Halvarsson as Nuffe
- Bert Sorbon as Putte
- Gunnar Höglund as Osse
- Lennart Nyberg as Harra
- Åke Johansson as Nisse
- Esten Areschoug as Svampen
- Lill-Acke Jacobsson as Jerka
- Karl-Gustaf Jonsson as Knutte
- Arne Söderberg as Jutte
- Arne Andersson as Hempe
- Thor Modéen as Grossh. Andersson
- Benkt-Åke Benktsson as Grossh. Nordin
- Eva Henning as Annie Nordin
- Eric Abrahamsson as Dir. Johansson
- Viran Rydkvist as Bondgumman
- Anna-Lisa Baude as Frök. Göransson
- Siri Olson as Lillan
- Karl Kinch as Jäderlund

== Bibliography ==
- Qvist, Per Olov & von Bagh, Peter. Guide to the Cinema of Sweden and Finland. Greenwood Publishing Group, 2000.
