= Jolly Musicians =

1932 film

- Directed by: Theodor Berthels; Weyler Hildebrand
- Written by: Weyler Hildebrand
- Starring: Mary Gräber; Ulla Sorbon; Anna Olin
- Cinematography: Ernst Westerberg
- Music by: Fred Winter
- Production company: Europa Film
- Distributed by: Europa Film
- Release date: 19 November 1932
- Running time: 91 minutes
- Country: Sweden
- Language: Swedish

Jolly Musicians (Swedish: Muntra musikanter) is a 1932 Swedish comedy film directed by Theodor Berthels and Weyler Hildebrand and starring Mary Gräber, Ulla Sorbon and Anna Olin. The film's sets were designed by the art director Bibi Lindström. It takes place on Walpurgis Night in Uppsala.

== Cast ==
- Mary Gräber as Mrs. Maria
- Ulla Sorbon as Eva, her niece
- Anna Olin as Mrs. Blomberg
- Lasse Dahlquist as Erik Blomberg
- Georg Blomstedt as Constable
- Isa Quensel as Margit, his daughter
- Fridolf Rhudin as Fridolf Svensson
- Weyler Hildebrand as Julius Göransson
- Naemi Briese as Girl in tobacco store
- Sonja Claesson as Mina
- Eivor Engelbrektsson as Happy student in stroller
- Hartwig Fock as The Mayor
- Jullan Jonsson as Kitchen manager
- John Melin as Policeman
- Holger Sjöberg as Fat student

== Bibliography ==
- Larsson, Mariah & Marklund, Anders. Swedish Film: An Introduction and Reader. Nordic Academic Press, 2010.
