= Frestelse =

- Directed by: Arne Bornebusch
- Written by: Torsten Lundqvist; Arne Bornebusch
- Produced by: Tage Linde
- Starring: Sonja Wigert; Åke Ohberg; Karl-Arne Holmsten
- Cinematography: Sven Thermænius
- Music by: Erik Baumann; Nathan Görling
- Distributed by: AB Svea Film
- Release date: February 9, 1940
- Running time: 93 minutes
- Country: Sweden
- Language: Swedish

Frestelse (Temptation) is a Swedish black-and-white drama film from 1940. It was directed by Arne Bornebusch. The screenplay was written by Torsten Lundqvist and Bornebusch.

== Production and release ==
The film was shot in 1939 at Europa Studio in Sundbyberg, Stockholm, and Norway. The film was released as Ingeborg Lien in Norway and as Suurkaupungin leikkikalu (Big City Plaything) in Finland.

== Plot ==
The young Norwegian fisherman's daughter Ingeborg Lien, who lives in a remote fishing village, dreams of success and the big city. She gets there and wins a beauty pageant. Ingeborg is attended to by two men, who have no other purpose than to enjoy her as a young and charming mistress for a while. When Ingeborg realizes this, she turns to a newly acquired female friend. During a police raid in a sinister gambling den, she manages to escape and is rescued by the taxi driver and engineering student Gustav Lind. He takes care of Ingeborg without asking for anything in return. Gustav also gets her a place as a nanny with his boss, but one day the police find her there. He buys a train ticket for Ingeborg so that she can travel back to the fishing village. She does not return home, but instead tries to drown herself. Ingeborg is saved in the end. She now understands what luxury and external appearances are worth, and she confidently looks forward to a different life together with Gustav.

== Cast ==
- Sonja Wigert as Ingeborg Lien
- Åke Ohberg as Rolf Arming
- Karl-Arne Holmsten as Gustav Lind
- Ullastina Rettig as Marianne
- Ludde Juberg as Lambert Ljunggren
- Gunnar Simenstad as Ole Arntsen
- Rune Carlsten as Tage Wickman
- Wera Lindby as Lillan
- George Thunstedt as Krister Strand
- Eric Gustafson as Set Wormgardt
- Tryggve Larssen as Jonas Lien
- Aagot Børseth as Asbjørg Lien
- Artur Rolén as the croupier
- Viran Rydkvist as the landlady
- Gösta Grip as the friend
