= Birgit Rosengren =

Swedish actress

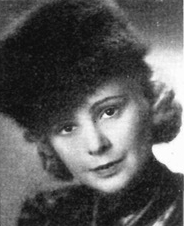
- Born: 27 November 1912; Maria Magdalena parish
- Died: 6 October 2011 (aged 98); Västerled
- Resting place: Norra begravningsplatsen
- Alma mater: Royal Dramatic Training Academy
- Occupation: Actor
- Spouse(s): Elof Ahrle, Eric Gustafson
- Children: Carina Ahrle, Leif Ahrle
- Relatives: Margit Rosengren

Birgit Rosengren (November 27, 1912 – October 6, 2011) was a Swedish film actress born in Stockholm, and most active from the 1930s to the early 1960s.

Rosengren made her film debut in 1934's Flickorna från Gamla Sta'n, directed by Schamyl Bauman. She was widowed twice. Her first husband was actor and film director Elof Ahrle, who died in 1965. Her second husband was Swedish actor Eric Gustafson. She lived in retirement at her home in Bromma, Stockholm. She remained active, giving a full interview to the Swedish newspaper, Svenska Dagbladet, shortly before her 98th birthday in 2010.

Her closest friends included Lasse Lönndahl and Göte Wilhelmsson. Rosengren died from complications of a fracture on October 6, 2011, at the age of 98.

== Filmography ==
- The Women Around Larsson (1934)
- Flickorna från Gamla Sta'n (1934)
- Flickor på fabrik (1935)
- Larsson i andra giftet (1935)
- The Quartet That Split Up (1936)
- Skicka hem Nr. 7 (1937)
- En sjöman går iland (1937)
- Kloka gubben (1938)
- Wanted (1939)
- Åh, en så'n advokat (1940)
- Lillebror och jag (1940)
- Uppåt igen (1941)
- Motherhood (1945)
- Sextetten Karlsson (1945)
- Skådetennis (1945)
- Åke klarar biffen (1952)
- My Passionate Longing (1956)
- Gäst hos bagaren (1958)
- Här kommer Petter (1963)
- I frid och värdighet (1979)
