= Onsdagsväninnan =

1946 film

- Directed by: Sture Lagerwall; Alice O'Fredericks
- Written by: Paul Sarauw
- Starring: Erik 'Bullen' Berglund
- Cinematography: Karl-Erik Alberts
- Edited by: Eric Nordemar
- Release date: 26 February 1946
- Country: Sweden
- Language: Swedish

Onsdagsväninnan is a 1946 Swedish film directed by Sture Lagerwall and Alice O'Fredericks.

The film was based on the play Peter den store by Paul Sarauw, which premiered in 1930 at Det Ny Theater. In 1943 the play was filmed in a Danish version as Hans onsdagsveninde, also directed by O'Fredericks.

== Cast ==
- Erik 'Bullen' Berglund - Larsson
- Sonja Wigert - Karin Larsson
- Gerda Lundequist - Mathilde Hallencreutz
- Sture Lagerwall - Douglas Hallencreutz
- Elof Ahrle - Baltzar Quensel
- Julia Cæsar - Landlady
