= Kalle Utter =

1925 film

- Directed by: Karin Swanström
- Written by: August Blanche (novel); Hjalmar Bergman
- Produced by: Stellan Claësson; Karin Swanström
- Starring: Anders de Wahl; Georg Blomstedt; John Ekman
- Cinematography: Ragnar Westfelt
- Production company: Bonnierfilm
- Distributed by: Svenska Filmkompaniet
- Release date: 2 February 1925
- Running time: 86 minutes
- Country: Sweden
- Languages: Silent; Swedish intertitles

Kalle Utter is a 1925 Swedish silent historical drama film directed by Karin Swanström and starring Anders de Wahl, Georg Blomstedt and John Ekman.

== Production ==
The film was premiered on February 2, 1925. The film was filmed at Bonnieratején at Kungsholmen in Stockholm with exteriors from Djurgården, Uppsala and Sturehov at Lake Mälaren by Ragnar Westfelt. As a model, they have August Blanches short stories Kalle Utter and The Finnish Baron published in 1863 and 1865. A TV version of Kalle Utter directed by Bernt Callenbo was shown on Television from 1971 to 1971.

== Cast ==
- Anders de Wahl as Kalle Utter
- Georg Blomstedt as Kalle's Father
- John Ekman as Baron Cedercreutz
- Nils Aréhn as Count Stjerncrona
- Karin Swanström as Countess Stjerncrona
- Edit Rolf as Marianne
- Carl Browallius as Professor
- Julia Cæsar as Guest
- Linnéa Hillberg as Ingeborg
- Gull Natorp as Prostinna
- Olav Riégo as Head Waiter

== Bibliography ==
- Gustafsson, Tommy. Masculinity in the Golden Age of Swedish Cinema: A Cultural Analysis of 1920s Films. McFarland, 2014.
- Qvist, Per Olov & von Bagh, Peter. Guide to the Cinema of Sweden and Finland. Greenwood Publishing Group, 2000.
- Wredlund, Bertil. Långfilm i Sverige: 1920-1929. Proprius, 1987.
