= Ove Tjernberg =

Swedish actor (1928–2001)

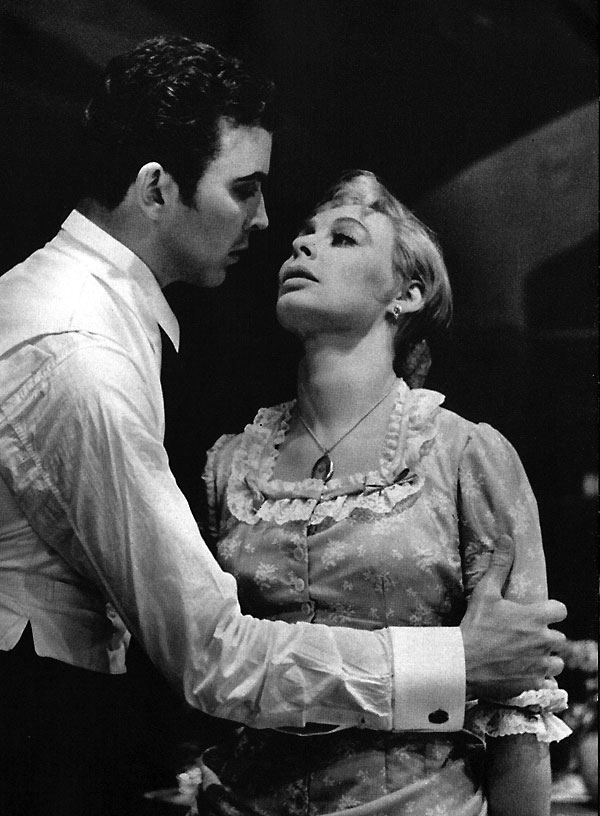
- Tjernberg with Gerd Hagman in Miss Julie, 1955
- Born: Sten Ove Filip Tjernberg; 27 December 1928; Uppsala, Sweden
- Died: 7 March 2001 (aged 72); Östhammar, Sweden
- Occupation: Actor
- Spouses: Ann-Marie Gyllenspetz (m. 1954; div. 1956) Lena Söderblom (m. 1957; div. 1973) Bodil Österlund (m. 1976; div. 1977) Kristina Hallams (m. 1978; div. 1981) Hjördis Berling (m. 1989–2001)

Sten Ove Filip Tjernberg (27 December 1928 – 7 March 2001) was a Swedish actor. He was engaged at Gothenburg City Theatre.

He appeared in a production of The Crucible, translated into Swedish by Britt G Hallqvist, at Gothenburg City Theatre in 1993.

He died in Östhammar on 7 March 2001 at the age of 72.

== Selected filmography ==
- 1996 - Jägarna
- 1994 - Läckan (TV)
- 1982 - Polisen som vägrade svara (TV)
- 1973 - Någonstans i Sverige (TV)
- 1973 - Den vita stenen (TV)
- 1965 - Nattcafé (TV film)
- 1965 - Morianna
