= Wanted (1939 film) =

1939 film

- Directed by: Schamyl Bauman
- Written by: Oscar Hemberg; Elin Wägner
- Starring: Edvin Adolphson; Birgit Rosengren; Elof Ahrle
- Cinematography: Hilmer Ekdahl
- Music by: Nathan Görling
- Production company: S. Bauman-Produktion
- Release date: 13 February 1939
- Running time: 102 minutes
- Country: Sweden
- Language: Swedish

Wanted (Swedish: Efterlyst) is a 1939 Swedish drama film directed by Schamyl Bauman and starring Edvin Adolphson, Birgit Rosengren and Elof Ahrle. It was shot at the Centrumateljéerna Studios in Stockholm.

== Synopsis ==
A woman sitting in a Stockholm cafe hears to her surprise on the radio that she is wanted by the police.

== Cast ==
- Edvin Adolphson as Gunnar Leijde
- Birgit Rosengren as Marja Elisabeth Benzon
- Elof Ahrle as Erik Svensson
- Thor Modéen as Patrik Rosén, waiter
- Isa Quensel as Ulla Ståhle
- Carin Swensson as Britta Pettersson
- Linnéa Hillberg as Elisaberth Johanni
- Nils Hultgren as Håkan Svennson
- Karin Kavli as Mrs. von Meissenfeldt
- Carl Deurell as Callerholm
- Marianne Aminoff as Linnéa
- Gösta Cederlund as The Mayor
- Julia Cæsar as Mrs. Jansson
- Helge Hagerman as Andersson
- Margit Andelius as Office Clerk
- Gustaf Färingborg as Lindberg
- Inga-Lill Åhström as Lilian
- Gösta Bodin as Restaurateur
- Helge Kihlberg as Restaurateur
- John Melin as Restaurateur
- Bellan Roos as Waitress
- Carl Browallius as Reverend
- Georg Fernqvist as Janitor
- Manne Grünberger as Errand Boy
- Ludde Juberg as Drunk man
- Magnus Kesster as Drunk man

== Bibliography ==
- Qvist, Per Olov & von Bagh, Peter. Guide to the Cinema of Sweden and Finland. Greenwood Publishing Group, 2000.
