= Sun over Sweden =

1938 film

- Directed by: Arne Bornebusch
- Written by: Theodor Berthels; Bertil Malmberg
- Produced by: Olle Brunaeus
- Starring: Nils Lundell; Rut Holm; Inga-Bodil Vetterlund
- Cinematography: Hilmer Ekdahl; Sven Thermænius
- Edited by: Emil A. Lingheim
- Music by: Erik Baumann
- Production company: Europa Film
- Distributed by: Europa Film
- Release date: 8 January 1938
- Running time: 91 minutes
- Country: Sweden
- Language: Swedish

Sun over Sweden (Swedish: Sol över Sverige) is a 1938 Swedish comedy film directed by Arne Bornebusch and starring Nils Lundell, Rut Holm and Inga-Bodil Vetterlund. It was shot at the Sundbyberg Studios in Stockholm and on location across Sweden. The film's sets were designed by the art director Bibi Lindström. It is a remake of the 1936 Danish film Sun Over Denmark.

== Synopsis ==
The film follows the adventures of a group of people travelling through Sweden, Nisse Lundin and his wife Rut on their honeymoon travelling with a truck and the shop assistants Britta and Inga on a bicycling holiday.

== Cast ==
- Nils Lundell as Nisse Lundin
- Rut Holm as Rut
- Greta Ericson as Britta
- Inga-Bodil Vetterlund as Inga Andersson
- Carl Browallius as Reverend Lundgren
- Nils Ericsson as Svante Linderholm
- Helge Hagerman as Bertil Lundgren
- Hugo Björne as Director S. Lundgren - Bertil's father
- Ragnar Falck as Kicke
- Ludde Gentzel as Ludde
- Signe Wirff as Mrs. Andersson, Inga's mother
- Max Linder as Caravan salesman
- Stig Johanson as Man outside shop
- Selma Lagerlöf as Self
- Verner von Heidenstam as Self

== Bibliography ==
- Bertil Wredlund & Rolf Lindfors. Långfilm i Sverige: 1930-1939. Proprius, 1983.
