= Rune Halvarsson =

Swedish actor

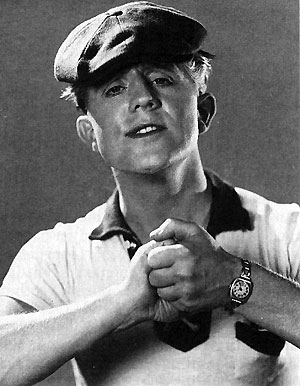
- Halvarsson in 1941
- Born: 30 July 1911; Stockholm, Sweden
- Died: 3 August 1969 (aged 58); Täby, Sweden
- Occupation: Actor
- Years active: 1938—1965

Rune Enok Halvarsson (30 July 1911 – 3 August 1969) was a Swedish actor. Halvarsson appeared in over 30 films between 1939 and 1965.

When Walt Disney's Fun and Fancy Free (1947) was dubbed into Swedish Halvarsson gave his voice to Mickey Mouse and when One Hundred and One Dalmatians (1961) was dubbed into Swedish, he gave his voice to Horace.

== Selected filmography ==
- Sjöcharmörer (1939)
- We're All Errand Boys (1941)
- Löjtnantshjärtan (1942)
- It Is My Music (1942)
- Life and Death (1943)
- Night in Port (1943)
- Eaglets (1944)
- Live Dangerously (1944)
- En dag skall gry (1944)
- Dolly Takes a Chance (1944)
- The Rose of Tistelön (1945)
- Ebberöds bank (1946)
- Fun and Fancy Free (1947) (Swedish voice)
- The Quartet That Split Up (1950)
- Resan till dej (1953)
- A Night in the Archipelago (1953)
- Jazzgossen (1958)
- Sängkammartjuven (1959)
- One Hundred and One Dalmatians (1961) (Swedish voice)
- Nightmare (1965)
