= Isa Quensel =

Swedish singer

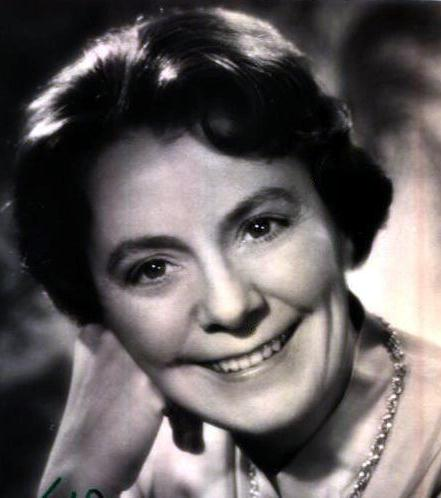
Isa Quensel

Isa Quensel (21 September 1905 – 3 November 1981) was a Swedish actress and operatic soprano who appeared in over 50 films, plays, operas, TV and radio shows. In 1939 she created the title role in the world premiere of Erich Wolfgang Korngold's Die Kathrin at the Royal Swedish Opera.

She was married to Ulf Thurin and had two children. She died on 3 November 1981 at the age of 76 in Lund.

== Partial filmography ==
- The Million Dollars (1926) - Journalist
- Kärlek måste vi ha (1931) - Cora
- The Love Express (1932) - Detective's Niece
- Jolly Musicians (1932) - Margit, his daughter
- House Slaves (1933) - Greta
- Pettersson & Bendel (1933) - Elsa Wallin
- Love and Dynamite (1933) - Rosa
- False Greta (1934) - Lisa
- Äventyr på hotell (1934) - Elly
- Raggen (1936) - Maria alias Raggen
- Min svärmor - dansösen (1936) - Sylvia
- The Girls of Uppakra (1936) - Elsa Brummell
- En flicka kommer till sta'n (1937) - Ulla Frank
- Happy Vestköping (1937) - Ann-Marie Brandt
- Wanted (1939) - Ulla Ståhle
- Marianne (1953) - Marianne's Mother
- The Chieftain of Göinge (1953) - Black-Elsa
- The Glass Mountain (1953) - Luiza Cabral
- The Unicorn (1955) - Harriet's Mother
- Moon Over Hellesta (1956) - Emmy Anckarberg
- Gårdarna runt sjön (1957) - Mathilde
- A Guest in His Own House (1957) - Stepmother
- Seventeen Years Old (1957) - Agnes Bentick
- The Lady in Black (1958) - Cecilia von Schilden
- The Koster Waltz (1958) - Doris Fågelström
- Playing on the Rainbow (1958) - Björn's Mother
- The Phantom Carriage (1958) - Maria
- Laila (1958) - Elli Logje
- Do You Believe in Angels? (1961) - Louise Günther
- Two Living, One Dead (1961) - Miss Larousse
- Pärlemor (1961) - Gertrude Odenstam
- Sällskapslek (1963) - Agda Stjernesten
- To Love (1964) - Märta
- Swedish Wedding Night (1964) - Hilma Palm
- Loving Couples (1964) - Fredrika von Strussenhjelm
- The Cats (1965) - Tora
- Woman of Darkness (1966)- Grave-Karna
- Mästerdetektiven Blomkvist på nya äventyr (1966, TV Movie) - Hilda Krikonblad
- Nya hyss av Emil i Lönneberga (1972) - Krösa-Maja (voice, uncredited)
- Emil and the Piglet (1973) - Krösa-Maja (voice)
- Agaton Sax och Byköpings gästabud (1976) - Aunt Tilda (voice)
