= Anna Olin =

Swedish actress

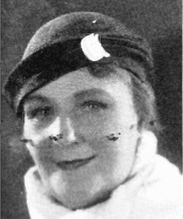
- Born: Anna Margareta Kristina Steckmeister; 19 June 1881; Stockholm, Sweden-Norway
- Died: 27 May 1946 (aged 64); Stockholm, Sweden
- Occupation: Actress
- Years active: 1923-1946 (film)

Anna Olin (born Anna Margareta Kristina Steckmeister; 19 June 1881 – 27 May 1946) was a Swedish stage and film actress. She was married to the Swedish actor and theatre director Vilhelm Olin.

== Selected filmography ==
- Johan Ulfstjerna (1923)
- The Storholmen Brothers (1932)
- Servant's Entrance (1932)
- Jolly Musicians (1932)
- What Do Men Know? (1933)
- Fired (1934)
- Andersson's Kalle (1934)
- Eva Goes Aboard (1934)
- The Marriage Game (1935)
- Raggen (1936)
- Poor Millionaires (1936)
- The Pale Count (1937)
- Her Little Majesty (1939)
- The Brothers' Woman (1943)
- Man's Woman (1945)
- Idel ädel adel (1945)
- Åsa-Hanna (1946)
- The Wedding on Solö (1946)

== Bibliography ==
- Goble, Alan. The Complete Index to Literary Sources in Film. Walter de Gruyter, 1999.
