= Life Goes On (1941 film) =

- Directed by: Anders Henrikson
- Written by: Dagmar Edqvist (novel); Bengt Idestam-Almquist; Anders Henrikson
- Produced by: Lorens Marmstedt
- Starring: Edvin Adolphson; Aino Taube; Sigurd Wallén
- Cinematography: Hilding Bladh
- Edited by: Ragnar Engström
- Music by: Lars-Erik Larsson
- Production company: Terrafilm
- Release date: 28 February 1941
- Running time: 84 minutes
- Country: Sweden
- Language: Swedish

Life Goes On (Swedish: Livet går vidare) is a 1941 Swedish drama film directed by Anders Henrikson and starring Edvin Adolphson, Aino Taube and Sigurd Wallén. It was shot at the Centrumateljéerna Studios in Stockholm. The film's sets were designed by the art director Arthur Spjuth.

== Synopsis ==
After years of service with the French Army in Africa, a Swedish officer returns home to recover from a bout of malaria.

== Cast ==
- Edvin Adolphson as Mikael Bourg
- Aino Taube as Ebba Garland
- Sigurd Wallén as Dr. Bolivar Garland
- Hasse Ekman as Ludvig
- Anders Henrikson as Andersson
- Margit Andelius as Woman at the Library
- Blenda Bruno as Nurse
- Åke Claesson as Librarian
- Nils Dahlgren as Doctor
- Carl Deurell as Man at the Library
- Ragnar Falck as Bengtsson, Worker
- Hartwig Fock as Carrier
- Anna-Lisa Fröberg as Woman
- Sten Hedlund as A Man
- Agda Helin as Wife
- Kaj Hjelm as Boy at the Library
- Hjördis Jansson as Nurse
- Stig Järrel as Kristensson
- Sten Lindgren as Dr. Holmström
- Sven-Bertil Norberg as French Officer
- Aurore Palmgren as Mrs. Johansson
- Olav Riégo as Sandgren
- Eva Stiberg as A Girl
- Ulla Wallin as Nurse
- Ragnar Widestedt as Banker

== Bibliography ==
- Per Olov Qvist & Peter von Bagh, Guide to the Cinema of Sweden and Finland. Greenwood Publishing Group, 2000.
