= Karin Albihn =

Swedish actress (1912–1974)

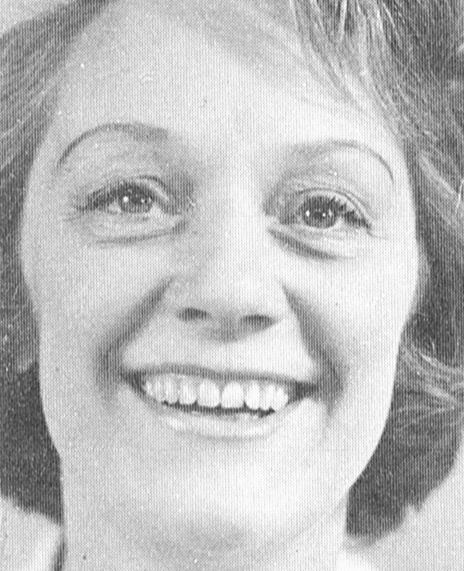
- Karin Albihn
- Born: 6 October 1912; Stockholm, Sweden
- Died: 4 September 1974 (aged 61); Märsta, Sweden
- Occupation: Actress
- Years active: 1933-1940 (film)

Karin Albihn (6 October 1912 – 4 September 1974) was a Swedish film and stage actress. She appeared in fourteen films in a mixture of leading and supporting roles. She was given a screen test in Berlin as the Nazi era German film industry attempted to find stars to replace the departed Marlene Dietrich, although this ultimately came to nothing.

== Selected filmography ==
- False Greta (1934)
- Conscientious Objector Adolf (1936)
- The Wedding Trip (1936)
- The Andersson Family (1937)
- The Pale Count (1937)
- Just a Bugler (1938)
- Styrman Karlssons flammor (1938)

== Bibliography ==
- Carter, Erica. Dietrich's Ghosts: The Sublime and the Beautiful in Third Reich Film. Bloomsbury Publishing, 2019.
- Rentschler, Eric. The Ministry of Illusion: Nazi Cinema and Its Afterlife. Harvard University Press, 1996.
