= Birgitta Arman =

Swedish actress (1921–2007)

- Born: Birgitta Arman; 3 August 1921
- Died: 13 April 2007 (aged 85); Sweden
- Occupation: Actress

Birgitta Arman (born 3 August 1921 in Stockholm, Sweden; died 13 April 2007 in Stockholm, Sweden) was a Swedish actress, best known for her roles in the 1940s, including her role as Gretta in the 1945 film Blood and Fire.

In 1940, she and Åke Johanson played the children of the titular family in The Bjorck Family. The following year, she appeared in a production of Zachris Topelius's Fågel blå at Sagoteatern at Medborgarhuset.

== Selected filmography ==
- The Bjorck Family (1940)
- The Case of Ingegerd Bremssen (1942)
- Life in the Country (1943)
- Imprisoned Women (1943)
- Blood and Fire (1945)
- Widower Jarl (1945)
