= The Sixth Shot =

1943 film

- Directed by: Hasse Ekman
- Written by: Gösta Stevens
- Produced by: Lorens Marmstedt
- Starring: Edvin Adolphson; Karin Ekelund; Gunn Wållgren; Nils Lundell
- Cinematography: Hilding Bladh
- Music by: Kai Gullmar; Sune Waldimir
- Production company: Terrafilm
- Distributed by: Terrafilm
- Release date: 24 September 1943
- Running time: 84 minutes
- Country: Sweden
- Language: Swedish

The Sixth Shot (Swedish: Sjätte skottet) is a 1943 Swedish drama film directed by Hasse Ekman and starring Edvin Adolphson, Karin Ekelund and Gunn Wållgren.

== Plot summary ==
Two people who feel unsuccessful meet one evening in Monte Carlo. Georg Winkler is even contemplating committing suicide, when he meets Marguerite Hoffman and they start discussing their lives over a drink. They agree to start a new life together.

Georg's talent is pistol shooting and Marguerite has been an actress, though not a successful one. They now start touring under the name "Hard & Hardy", where Georg uses his pistol in a lethally dangerous number with Marguerite as a target. They are now touring with a hit number, happy and in love. But on the back of jealousy, even the best of plans can go terribly wrong...

== Cast ==
- Edvin Adolphson as Georg Winkler, "Mr. Hard"
- Karin Ekelund as Marguerite Hoffman, "Miss Hardy"
- Gunn Wållgren as Lulu
- Nils Lundell as Toni, the clown
- Olof Widgren as Björn Hoffman
- Tore Lindwall as Chief Superintendent
- David Erikson as stablekeeper
- Sten Hedlund as police commissary
- Nils Johannisson as Director Möller
- Wiktor "Kulörten" Andersson as Carnival Barker
- Otto Moskovitz as Kiki, dwarf at Cirkus Zoo
- Willi Wells as Danish konferencier
- Agda Helin as Vera Violetta
- Mimi Nelson as Ung dam på kaféet i Paris
- Artur Rolén as Ceremonimästare
- Siegfried Fischer as Man in häkte

== Bibliography ==
- Gustafsson, Fredrik. The Man from the Third Row: Hasse Ekman, Swedish Cinema and the Long Shadow of Ingmar Bergman. Berghahn Books, 2016.
- Qvist, Per Olov & von Bagh, Peter. Guide to the Cinema of Sweden and Finland. Greenwood Publishing Group, 2000.
