= Just a Bugler =

1938 film

- Directed by: Anders Henrikson
- Written by: Weyler Hildebrand; Torsten Lundqvist
- Produced by: Harry Malmstedt
- Starring: Adolf Jahr; Elof Ahrle; Sickan Carlsson
- Cinematography: Martin Bodin; Gunnar Fischer
- Edited by: Oscar Rosander
- Music by: Lasse Dahlquist; Gösta Wallenius
- Production company: Wivefilm
- Distributed by: Wivefilm
- Release date: 26 August 1938
- Running time: 93 minutes
- Country: Sweden
- Language: Swedish

Just a Bugler (Swedish: Bara en trumpetare) is a 1938 Swedish comedy film directed by Anders Henrikson and starring Adolf Jahr, Elof Ahrle and Sickan Carlsson. It was shot at the Råsunda Studios in Stockholm and on location at Gripsholm Castle. The film's sets were designed by the art director Arne Åkermark.

== Synopsis ==
A bugler serving in the Swedish army has both romantic and musical ambitions. He also has a lengthy dream imagining he is fighting in the army of Charles XII in the early eighteenth century.

== Cast ==
- Adolf Jahr as Adolf Berg
- Elof Ahrle as Loffe
- Sickan Carlsson as Gertrud Brinkman
- Gustaf Lövås as Putte
- Katie Rolfsen as Svea Hjorth
- Carl Hagman as Brinkman
- Karin Albihn as Stina Brinkman
- Weyler Hildebrand as Göransson
- Emy Hagman as Augusta
- Nils Ericsson as Gottfried
- Carin Swensson as Karin
- Bror Bügler as Lt. Braune
- Elsa Jahr as Anna, cook
- Douglas Håge as Berg
- John Botvid as Usher
- Åke Grönberg as Ensign musician
- Anders Henrikson as Colonel

== Bibliography ==
- Qvist, Per Olov & von Bagh, Peter. Guide to the Cinema of Sweden and Finland. Greenwood Publishing Group, 2000.
