= Julia Cæsar =

Swedish actress (1885–1971)

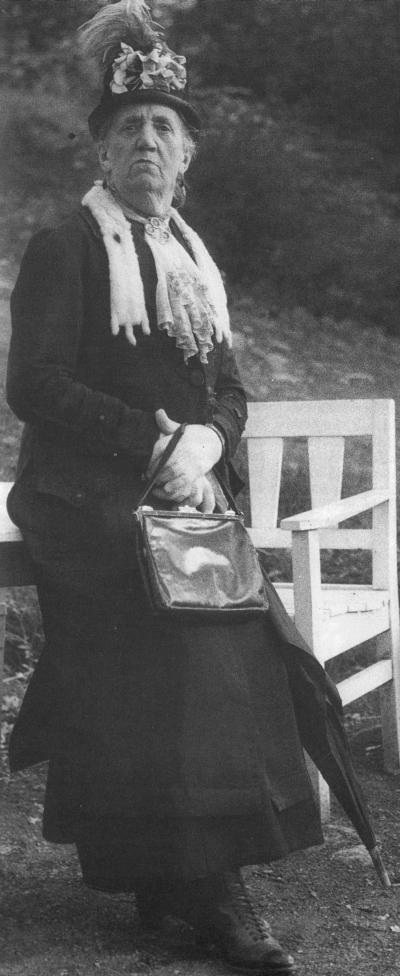
- Julia Cæsar in 1960, as "Skräcktanten" in the stage version of Kvartetten som sprängdes
- Born: Julia Maria Vilhelmina Cæsar; 28 January 1885; Stockholm, Sweden
- Died: 18 July 1971 (aged 86); Stockholm, Sweden
- Occupation: Actress
- Years active: 1905–1968

Julia Maria Vilhelmina Cæsar (28 January 1885 – 18 July 1971) was a Swedish actress. Her acting career spanned from 1905 until 1968, during which time she appeared in a large number of revues, plays, and films.

== Early life ==
Cæsar was born in Östermalm in Stockholm in 1885. Her father, Gustav Cæsar, was a sergeant belonging to the Royal Svea Life Guards. At the time, Östermalm was a poor part of Stockholm, and Cæsar had a difficult childhood where she periodically had to stay in different foster homes, and sometimes she also lived with her uncle, August Cæsar, who was a prison guard at Långholmen prison. At the age of 12, she had to leave school and start working as a delivery girl in a shop.

== Career ==
Cæsar was interested in the theatre from a very early age, and she would run errands for actors and help out behind the stage in the evenings and on weekends, when she was not at work. She started to get small parts as a background actor when she was 16 years old, and in 1905 she got her first speaking part, as a 100-year-old woman in a revue by Emil Norlander at the Kristallsalongen theatre. She continued to get increasingly important parts, mainly in revues and popular light plays.

Except for the period 1913–1919, when she was at the Apollo Theatre in Helsinki, Cæsar remained in Stockholm where she worked at theatres including the Pallas Theatre, the Odeon Theatre, Södra Teatern, Mosebacke, as well as open-air stages at Tantolunden and Rålambshov.

Julia Cæsar (right) in 1906, in the revue Hertiginnan af Danviken

Cæsar's film career began in 1913 with a small uncredited part in Victor Sjöström's Ingeborg Holm, and she also had a background part in Sjöström's 1921 film Körkarlen. Her first substantial film role, which became her movie breakthrough, was in the 1922 film Anderssonskans Kalle directed by Emil Norlander. She became a prolific film actor, with more than 130 roles to her credit.

Throughout her career, Cæsar played a variety of parts, but she became most strongly associated with a particular type: the crusty old woman with a (sometimes well-hidden) heart of gold. She had a very strong voice, which was imperative when working at an open-air theatre, and when she played revues at Tantolunden's theatre she learnt to time her lines so they would not be drowned by the trains passing nearby.

In 1967, at the age of 82, Cæsar's recording of the song Annie från Amörka charted at Svensktoppen, making her the oldest artist to feature on that chart.

== Personal life ==
Cæsar never married. She lived together with the operetta singer Frida Falk until the latter's death in 1948, after which Cæsar kept Falk's ashes in an urn on her mantelpiece.

On 28 June 1968, Cæsar had a stroke, immediately before she was scheduled to perform Annie från Amörka at Skansen. She never recovered entirely, and was mostly bound to her bed for the last years of her life. She died in 1971, and is buried at Bromma Church.

== Selected filmography ==
- Andersson's Kalle (1922)
- New Pranks of Andersson's Kalle (1923)
- Kalle Utter (1925)
- Her Little Majesty (1925)
- The Girl in Tails (1926)
- The Realm of the Rye (1929)
- Tired Theodore (1931)
- Black Roses (1932)
- His Life's Match (1932)
- Boman's Boy (1933)
- Fridolf in the Lion's Den (1933)
- Simon of Backabo (1934)
- Andersson's Kalle (1934)
- The Boys of Number Fifty Seven (1935)
- The People of Småland (1935)
- Our Boy (1936)
- He, She and the Money (1936)
- Oh, Such a Night! (1937)
- Hotel Paradise (1937)
- Thunder and Lightning (1938)
- Her Little Majesty (1939)
- Wanted (1939)
- We at Solglantan (1939)
- Nothing But the Truth (1939)
- Hanna in Society (1940)
- Woman on Board (1941)
- Lasse-Maja (1941)
- Lucky Young Lady (1941)
- The Ghost Reporter (1941)
- Poor Ferdinand (1941)
- The Poor Millionaire (1941)
- Nothing Is Forgotten (1942)
- We House Slaves (1942)
- The Case of Ingegerd Bremssen (1942)
- In Darkest Smaland (1943)
- Little Napoleon (1943)
- Katrina (1943)
- A Girl for Me (1943)
- Dolly Takes a Chance (1944)
- The Green Lift (1944)
- The Girl and the Devil (1944)
- We Need Each Other (1944)
- Eaglets (1944)
- The Österman Brothers' Virago (1945)
- Fram för lilla Märta (1945)
- His Majesty Must Wait (1945)
- Crisis (1946)
- Peggy on a Spree (1946)
- Incorrigible (1946)
- It Rains on Our Love (1946)
- Between Brothers (1946)
- Onsdagsväninnan (1946)
- Poor Little Sven (1947)
- Private Karlsson on Leave (1947)
- Wedding Night (1947)
- Private Bom (1948)
- Loffe the Tramp (1948)
- Sunshine (1948)
- Each Heart Has Its Own Story (1948)
- Dangerous Spring (1949)
- The Street (1949)
- Woman in White (1949)
- Pippi Longstocking (1949)
- Big Lasse of Delsbo (1949)
- Father Bom (1949)
- The Kiss on the Cruise (1950)
- The Saucepan Journey (1950)
- Two Stories Up (1950)
- When Love Came to the Village (1950)
- Skipper in Stormy Weather (1951)
- Åsa-Nisse on Holiday (1953)
- Speed Fever (1953)
- Enchanted Walk (1954)
- The Girl in Tails (1956)
- Lovely Is the Summer Night (1961)
- Morianna (1965)
- Hemsöborna (1966)
