= Elof Ahrle =

Swedish actor (1900–1965)

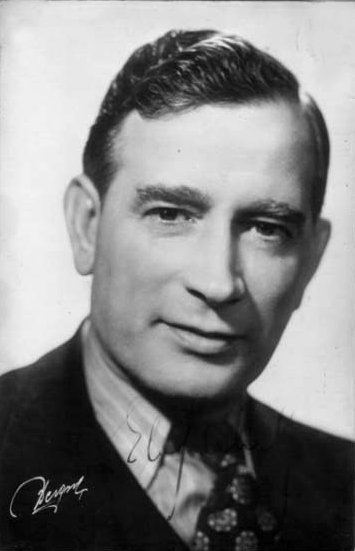
- Born: 21 January 1900; Nyköping, Sweden
- Died: 3 June 1965 (aged 65)
- Occupations: Actor; Film director
- Years active: 1920–1960
- Spouses: Naemi Briese (m. 1931–1939) Birgit Rosengren (m. 1940–1965)

Elof Ahrle (21 January 1900 – 3 June 1965) was a Swedish actor and film director. He appeared in 80 films between 1920 and 1960. He also directed ten films between 1942 and 1950. He was married to actress Birgit Rosengren.

== Selected filmography ==
- The Phantom Carriage (1921)
- The Boys of Number Fifty Seven (1935)
- 65, 66 and I (1936)
- Shipwrecked Max (1936)
- Russian Flu (1937)
- Oh, Such a Night! (1937)
- Comrades in Uniform (1938)
- The Great Love (1938)
- Just a Bugler (1938)
- Wanted (1939)
- Oh, What a Boy! (1939)
- Alle man på post (1940)
- Heroes in Yellow and Blue (1940)
- Fransson the Terrible (1941)
- Tre glada tokar (1942)
- Mister Collins' Adventure (1943)
- Live Dangerously (1944)
- Blåjackor (1945)
- Motherhood (1945)
- Onsdagsväninnan (1946)
- Pengar – en tragikomisk saga (1946)
- Song of Stockholm (1947)
- Soldier's Reminder (1947)
- Maria (1947)
- Life at Forsbyholm Manor (1948)
- Loffe the Tramp (1948)
- Loffe as a Millionaire (1948)
- My Sister and I (1950)
- Two Stories Up (1950)
- The Motor Cavaliers (1950)
- While the City Sleeps (1950)
- Skipper in Stormy Weather (1951)
- Say It with Flowers (1952)
- The Chieftain of Göinge (1953)
- Bill Bergson and the White Rose Rescue (1953)
- Taxi 13 (1954)
- Men in the Dark (1955)
- The Summer Wind Blows (1955)
- The Dance Hall (1955)
- Paradise (1955)
- Rasmus, Pontus och Toker (1956)
- Never in Your Life (1957)
- The Jazz Boy (1958)
- Pirates on the Malonen (1959)
- The Judge (1960)
