= Nils Dahlgren =

Swedish actor

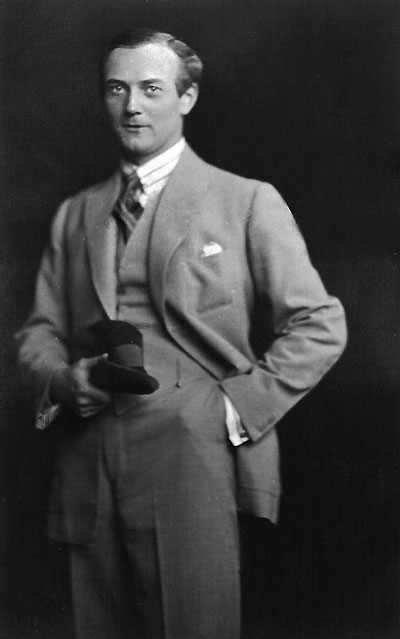
- Dahlgren (c.1920)
- Born: Nils Ivar Edvard Dahlgren; 2 April 1891; Kalmar, Sweden
- Died: 30 October 1948 (aged 57); Stockholm, Sweden
- Occupation: Actor
- Years active: 1934-1948 (film)

Nils Ivar Edvard Dahlgren (2 April 1891 – 30 October 1948) was a Swedish stage and film actor. He acted on stage for around twenty years before making his film debut in 1934. He generally played small, supporting parts on screen but played a leading role as a missionary in the 1948 drama I Am with You shortly before his death.

== Selected filmography ==
- Simon of Backabo (1934)
- The Marriage Game (1935)
- The Wedding Trip (1936)
- Thunder and Lightning (1938)
- Dollar (1938)
- One, But a Lion! (1940)
- Kiss Her! (1940)
- Life Goes On (1941)
- Home from Babylon (1941)
- General von Döbeln (1942)
- There's a Fire Burning (1943)
- I Killed (1943)
- The Old Clock at Ronneberga (1944)
- Torment (1944)
- The Journey Away (1945)
- His Majesty Must Wait (1945)
- Kristin Commands (1946)
- Incorrigible (1946)
- Each Heart Has Its Own Story (1948)
- Port of Call (1948)
- I Am with You (1948)

== Bibliography ==
- Paietta, Ann C.. Saints, Clergy and Other Religious Figures on Film and Television, 1895–2003. McFarland, 2005.
- Steene, Birgitta. Ingmar Bergman: A Reference Guide. Amsterdam University Press, 2005.
