= Conflict (1937 film) =

1937 film

- Directed by: Per-Axel Branner
- Written by: Josef Kjellgren; Per-Axel Branner
- Produced by: Stellan Claësson
- Starring: Lars Hanson; Sigurd Wallén; Aino Taube
- Cinematography: Martin Bodin
- Edited by: Oscar Rosander
- Music by: Eric Bengtson
- Production company: Alliansfilm
- Distributed by: Svensk Talfilm
- Release date: 15 January 1937
- Running time: 74 minutes
- Country: Sweden
- Language: Swedish

Conflict (Swedish: Konflikt) is a 1937 Swedish drama film directed by Per-Axel Branner and starring Lars Hanson, Sigurd Wallén and Aino Taube. It was shot at the Råsunda Studios in Stockholm. The film's sets were designed by the art director Arne Åkermark.

== Synopsis ==
Shipbuilder Edvard Banck is so busy working on a new design, that he neglects his wife Birgit. She is drawn to the recently arrived engineer Reidar and resolves to leave her husband.

== Cast ==
- Lars Hanson as Edvard Banck
- Sigurd Wallén as Gustaf Larsson
- Aino Taube as Birgit Banck
- Balthazar Bergh as Reidar Hagen
- Anders Henrikson as Jerker
- Björn Berglund as Kalle Karlsson
- Rune Carlsten as Herbert Broon
- Sven Bergvall as President of the worker's union
- Gösta Cederlundas General manager Haard
- Lotten Olsson as Lovisa Larsson
- Astrid Bodin as Banck's cook
- Eivor Engelbrektsson as Maid Anna
- Victor Thorén as Vicke
- Carl Deurell as Member of the board
- Knut Lambert as Member of the board
- Erik Rosén as Member of the board
- Kolbjörn Knudsen as Shipyard worker
- Tore Lindwall as Shipyard worker with rope
- Hjalmar Peters as Old Shipyard Worker
- Georg Skarstedt as Shipyard Worker
- Tom Walter as Shipyard Worker
- Olav Riégo as Banck's assistant
- Albert Ståhl as Foreman

== Bibliography ==
- Qvist, Per Olov & von Bagh, Peter. Guide to the Cinema of Sweden and Finland. Greenwood Publishing Group, 2000.
- Wredlund, Bertil & Lindfors, Rolf. Långfilm i Sverige: 1930-1939. Proprius, 1983.
