= Aino Taube =

Swedish actress (1912–1990)

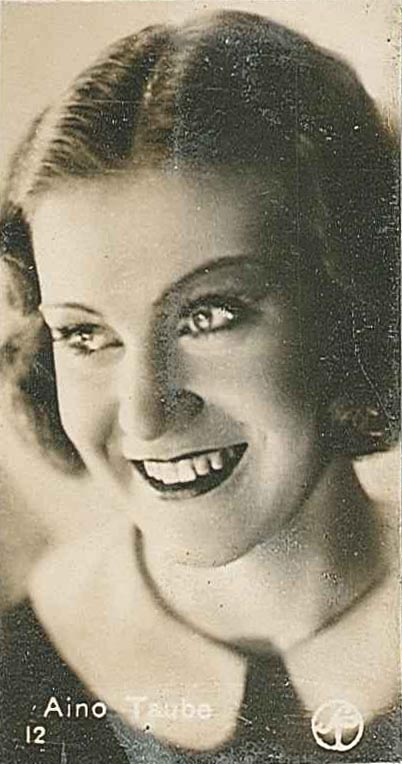
- Born: Aino Regina Taube; 11 July 1912; Espergærde, Denmark
- Died: 3 June 1990 (aged 77); Stockholm, Sweden
- Occupation: Actress
- Years active: 1931–1988
- Spouse: Anders Henrikson (m. 1940; died 1965)
- Children: Mathias Henrikson (1940–2005); Ella Henrikson (1941–1972); Thomas Henrikson (born 1942)
- Parent(s): Mathias Taube; Ella Ekman-Hansen

Aino Regina Taube (11 July 1912 – 3 June 1990) was a Swedish film and theatre actress. She appeared in 50 films between 1931 and 1988.

== Selected filmography ==
- Skipper's Love (1931)
- Students in Paris (1932)
- A Stolen Waltz (1932)
- Augusta's Little Misstep (1933)
- Fridolf in the Lion's Den (1933)
- Man's Way with Women (1934)
- Kanske en gentleman (1935)
- Walpurgis Night (1935)
- The Quartet That Split Up (1936)
- Raggen (1936)
- Sara Learns Manners (1937)
- Conflict (1937)
- Art for Art's Sake (1938)
- Only One Night (1939)
- They Staked Their Lives (1940)
- Life Goes On (1941)
- His Majesty Must Wait (1945)
- The Key and the Ring (1947)
- Secrets of Women (1952)
- For the Sake of My Intemperate Youth (1952)
- Last Pair Out (1956)
- A Guest in His Own House (1957)
- The Touch (1971)
- Face to Face (1976)
- Friends (1988)
