= Blood and Fire (film) =

1945 film by Anders Henrikson

- Film poster
- Directed by: Anders Henrikson
- Written by: Bertil Malmberg
- Starring: Anders Henrikson
- Cinematography: Harald Berglund
- Edited by: Harald Berglund
- Music by: Herbert Sandberg
- Release date: 1 October 1945
- Country: Sweden
- Language: Swedish

Blood and Fire (Swedish: Blod och eld) is a 1945 Swedish drama film directed by Anders Henrikson. It was entered into the 1946 Cannes Film Festival.

== Cast ==
- Anders Henrikson as Thomas Hell
- Sonja Wigert as Lilli
- George Fant as Herman Nilsson
- Inga Waern as Anna
- Karin Alexandersson as Maria
- Douglas Håge as Male Customer
- Carl-Gunnar Wingård as The Officer
- Birgitta Arman as Greta
- Henrik Schildt as Gurra
- Ninni Löfberg as Svea
- Gösta Ericsson as Nisse
- Håkan Jahnberg as The Doctor
