= Bror Bügler =

Swedish actor

- Born: 11 December 1908; Vänersborg, Sweden
- Died: 3 October 1975 (aged 66); Skälderviken, Sweden
- Occupations: Director, Actor
- Years active: 1937-1953 (film)

Bror Bügler (11 December 1908 – 3 October 1975) was a Swedish film actor. He also directed three films.

== Selected filmography ==
- Oh, Such a Night! (1937)
- Art for Art's Sake (1938)
- A Woman's Face (1938)
- Just a Bugler (1938)
- Good Friends and Faithful Neighbours (1938)
- Circus (1939)
- Nothing But the Truth (1939)
- With Open Arms (1940)
- Första divisionen (1941)
- Scanian Guerilla (1941)
- The Ghost Reporter (1941)
- Sun Over Klara (1942)
- Adventurer (1942)
- A Girl for Me (1943)
- Life in the Country (1943)
- Each Heart Has Its Own Story (1948)
- The Girl from Backafall (1953)

== Bibliography ==
- Chandler, Charlotte. Ingrid: Ingrid Bergman, A Personal Biography. Simon and Schuster, 2007.
