= Each Heart Has Its Own Story =

1948 film

- Directed by: Bror Bügler
- Written by: Bror Bügler; Christian Molbech (novel); Edvard Persson
- Starring: Edvard Persson; Inger Juel; Hilda Borgström
- Cinematography: Harald Berglund
- Edited by: Wic Kjellin
- Music by: Alvar Kraft
- Production company: Europa Film
- Release date: 13 September 1948
- Running time: 104 minutes
- Country: Sweden
- Language: Swedish

Each Heart Has Its Own Story (Swedish: Vart hjärta har sin saga) is a 1948 Swedish historical drama film directed by Bror Bügler and starring Edvard Persson, Inger Juel and Hilda Borgström.

The film's sets were designed by Arne Åkermark.

== Cast ==
- Edvard Persson as Baron Henric Löwencrona af Löwstaborg
- Inger Juel as Hildegard
- Hilda Borgström as Aunt Louise
- Dagmar Ebbesen as Countess Euphrosine von dem Rein
- Henrik Schildt as Claes
- Kenne Fant as Agne Borg, librarian
- John Ekman as Cavalry Captain
- Ebba Wrede as Bodil
- Axel Högel as Tax collector
- John Norrman as Klockaren
- Otto Landahl as Crofter
- Julia Cæsar as Husmansell
- Nils Dahlgren as Servant
- Thure Carlman as Man
- Artur Cederborgh as Vicar
- Theodor Olsson as Man
- Erik Strandell as Man
- Carin Swensson as Lina, maid

== Bibliography ==
- Qvist, Per Olov & von Bagh, Peter. Guide to the Cinema of Sweden and Finland. Greenwood Publishing Group, 2000.
