= Gunnar Höglund =

Swedish actor (1923-1984)

- Born: 18 February 1923; Stockholm, Sweden
- Died: 16 June 1984 (aged 61); Stockholm, Sweden
- Occupations: Actor; Film director Screenwriter
- Years active: 1938-1978

Gunnar Höglund (18 February 1923 – 16 June 1984) was a Swedish actor, film director and screenwriter. His 1964 film My Love and I was entered into the 15th Berlin International Film Festival.

== Selected filmography ==
- Good Friends and Faithful Neighbours (1938)
- Whalers (1939)
- Her Little Majesty (1939)
- We're All Errand Boys (1941)
- Woman on Board (1941)
- Young Blood (1943)
- My Love and I (1964)
- Want So Much To Believe (1971)
- Faire l'amour : De la pilule à l'ordinateur (1971, anthology film)
