= Raggen =

1936 film

- Directed by: Schamyl Bauman
- Written by: Gunnar Widegren (novel); Oscar Hemberg
- Starring: Nils Wahlbom; Anna Olin; Isa Quensel
- Cinematography: Hilmer Ekdahl
- Edited by: Emil A. Pehrsson
- Music by: Erik Baumann
- Production company: Europa Film
- Distributed by: Europa Film
- Release date: 27 February 1936
- Running time: 86 minutes
- Country: Sweden
- Language: Swedish

Raggen or Raggen – That's Me (Swedish: Raggen - det är jag det) is a 1936 Swedish comedy film directed by Schamyl Bauman and starring Nils Wahlbom, Anna Olin and Isa Quensel. It was shot at the Sundbyberg Studios in Stockholm and on location in Paris. The film's sets were designed by the art director Bibi Lindström.

== Cast ==
- Nils Wahlbom as H. Winroth
- Anna Olin as Mrs. Winroth
- Isa Quensel as Maria alias Raggen
- Solveig Hedengran as Stina
- Sally Palmblad as Hedvig / Nora
- Britt Nordborg as Magda
- Gerd Nordborg as Sofia
- Nils Lundell as Olle Berglind
- Margit Andelius as Pyret
- Aino Taube as Josephine Baker
- Anna-Stina Wåglund as Margareta
- Stig Järrel as . Purjo
- Fritiof Billquist as Per-Lennart Lundblad
- Karin Ahldén as Ninni Nyman
- Astrid Bodin as Hat Check Girl
- Hartwig Fock as Bernhard Lundkvist
- Helge Hagerman as Gustaf
- Anki Kleist as Crazed Shrew
- Einar Lindström as Gustaf Adolf Nilsson
- Robert Ryberg as Guest at the club in Paris
- Ilse-Nore Tromm as Dancing woman in Paris
- Carl-Gunnar Wingård as Consul Westerlund

== Bibliography ==
- Per Olov Qvist & Peter von Bagh. Guide to the Cinema of Sweden and Finland. Greenwood Publishing Group, 2000.
