= Loffe the Tramp =

1948 film

- Directed by: Gösta Werner
- Written by: Arne Mehrens
- Produced by: Stellan Claësson
- Starring: Elof Ahrle; Wiktor Andersson; Agneta Prytz
- Cinematography: Karl-Erik Alberts
- Edited by: Eric Nordemar
- Music by: Jules Sylvain
- Production company: Kungsfilm
- Distributed by: Kungsfilm
- Release date: 3 January 1948
- Running time: 86 minutes
- Country: Sweden
- Language: Swedish

Loffe the Tramp (Swedish: Loffe på luffen) is a 1948 Swedish comedy film directed by Gösta Werner and starring Elof Ahrle, Wiktor Andersson and Agneta Prytz. It was shot at the Centrumateljéerna Studios in Stockholm and on location in the city. The film's sets were designed by the art director Bertil Duroj. It was followed by a sequel Loffe as a Millionaire later the same year with Ahrle reprising his role.

== Cast ==
- Elof Ahrle as Loffe Fridh
- Wiktor Andersson as Trubbnos
- Erik Berglund as Dahlberg
- Agneta Prytz as Anna-Lisa
- Lasse Krantz as Andersson
- Yngve Nordwall as Heiman
- Theodor Berthels as Police Inspector
- Julia Cæsar as Hotel hostess
- Bengt Eklund as Police Officer
- Sture Ericson as Man at bicycle
- Gustav Hedberg as Police
- Magnus Kesster as Sjökvist
- Mimi Nelson as Young woman at pharmacy store
- Gösta Prüzelius as Police Officer
- Hans Strååt as Public Prosecutor
- Lissi Alandh as Bridesmaid
- Margaretha Bergström as Telephone Operator
- Carl Ericson as Janitor
- Gunnel Wadner as Telephone Operator
- Chris Wahlström as Waitress

== Bibliography ==
- Cowie, Peter Françoise Buquet, Risto Pitkänen & Godfried Talboom. Scandinavian Cinema: A Survey of the Films and Film-makers of Denmark, Finland, Iceland, Norway, and Sweden. Tantivy Press, 1992.
