= Want So Much to Believe =

1971 Swedish romance film

Vill så gärna tro
- Promotional movie poster for the film
- Directed by: Gunnar Höglund
- Written by: Gunnar Höglund
- Produced by: Gunnar Höglund
- Starring: Johnny Nash; Christina Schollin; Ingrid Backlin; Lars Lind; Cia Löwgren; Helena Mäkelä; Essy Persson; Niclas Wahlgren; Catrin Westerlund
- Cinematography: Hans Dittmer
- Edited by: Lasse Lundberg
- Music by: John Bundrick; Bob Marley; Johnny Nash
- Release date: 4 September 1971 (Sweden)
- Running time: 108 minutes (theatrical version)
- Country: Sweden
- Language: Swedish

Want So Much to Believe (Swedish: Vill så gärna tro) is a 1971 romance film. It is directed by Gunnar Höglund and stars Johnny Nash and Christina Schollin. It is about a Swedish flight attendant (Christina Schollin) who falls in love with a black American man (Johnny Nash). The film was Niclas Wahlgren's acting debut.

The film score was composed by John Bundrick and Bob Marley.
