= Thunder and Lightning (1938 film) =

1938 film

- Directed by: Anders Henrikson
- Written by: P. G. Wodehouse (novel); Hasse Ekman
- Starring: Olof Winnerstrand; Nils Wahlbom; Frida Winnerstrand; Åke Söderblom
- Cinematography: Elner Åkesson
- Edited by: Oscar Rosander
- Music by: Eric Bengtson
- Production company: Svensk Filmindustri
- Distributed by: Svensk Filmindustri
- Release date: 21 March 1938
- Running time: 91 minutes
- Country: Sweden
- Language: Swedish

Thunder and Lightning (Swedish: Blixt och dunder) is a 1938 Swedish comedy film directed by Anders Henrikson and starring Olof Winnerstrand, Nils Wahlbom, and Frida Winnerstrand. It is an adaptation of the 1929 novel Summer Lightning by P.G. Wodehouse, one of the most widely read humorists of the 20th century. The film's art direction was by Arne Åkermark.

Thunder and Lightning is a version of the 1933 film Summer Lightning. Both films are based on the same Wodehouse novel.

== Cast ==
- Olof Winnerstrand as Magnus Gabriel Hägerskiöld
- Nils Wahlbom as Pontus Hägerskiöld
- Frida Winnerstrand as Charlotta Hägerskiöld
- Åke Söderblom as Claes-Ferdinande Hägerskiöld
- Marianne Aminoff as Inga
- Hasse Ekman as Bertil Bendix
- Sickan Carlsson as Pyret Hanson
- Eric Abrahamsson as Head Waiter Härman
- Torsten Winge as Axel Hjalmar Stencloo
- Weyler Hildebrand as Charlie Blomberg
- Alice Babs as Flower Girl
- Julia Cæsar as Telegraph operator
- Emil Fjellström as Andersson
- Nils Dahlgren as Head waiter at Savoy
- David Erikson as Driver
- Georg Fernqvist as Waiter at Savoy
- Åke Grönberg as Chucker-out
- Eivor Landström as Guest at Savoy
- Otto Malmberg as Adolf

== Bibliography ==
- Qvist, Per Olov & von Bagh, Peter. Guide to the Cinema of Sweden and Finland. Greenwood Publishing Group, 2000.
