= My Love and I =

- Swedish DVD Cover
- Directed by: Gunnar Höglund
- Written by: Bosse Gustafsson; Gunnar Höglund
- Starring: Mathias Henrikson; Maude Adelson; Lars Lind; Guy de la Berg; Josef Blind
- Cinematography: Bertil Wiktorsson
- Edited by: Jan Persson
- Music by: Karl-Erik Welin
- Distributed by: Warner-Tonefilm AB
- Release date: 19 December 1964
- Running time: 106 minutes
- Country: Sweden
- Language: Swedish

My Love and I (Swedish: Kungsleden) is a 1964 Swedish thriller film directed by Gunnar Höglund. It was entered into the 15th Berlin International Film Festival. It was released on DVD in March 2008.

== Cast ==
- Mathias Henrikson - Du (You)
- Maude Adelson - Leni Wodak
- Lars Lind - Den andre (Other Man)
- Guy de la Berg - German Tourist
- Josef Blind - Andreas

== Production ==
The film was shot along Kungsleden in Lapland and in the studios of Omega-Films in Stockholm.
