= Woman on Board =

1941 film

- Directed by: Gunnar Skoglund
- Written by: Dagmar Edqvist (novel); Gunnar Skoglund
- Produced by: Lorens Marmstedt
- Starring: Edvin Adolphson; Karin Ekelund; Hampe Faustman
- Cinematography: Hilding Bladh
- Edited by: Gunnar Skoglund
- Music by: Lars-Erik Larsson
- Production company: Terrafilm
- Distributed by: Terrafilm
- Release date: 29 October 1941
- Running time: 84 minutes
- Country: Sweden
- Language: Swedish

Woman on Board (Swedish: En kvinna ombord) is a 1941 war drama film directed by Gunnar Skoglund and starring Edvin Adolphson, Karin Ekelund and Hampe Faustman. It was shot at the Centrumateljéerna Studios in Stockholm. The film's sets were designed by the art director Bibi Lindström.

== Cast ==
- Edvin Adolphson as Kapten Åkesson
- Karin Ekelund as Ingrid
- Hampe Faustman as Martin Frost
- Sten Larsson as Anton Stillman
- Sigge Fürst as Förste styrman
- Knut Burgh as Andre styrman
- Åke Grönberg as Andersson
- Gunnar Sjöberg as Blomqvist
- Björn Berglund as Fredlund
- Julia Cæsar as Mammy
- Emil Fjellström as Blom
- Tom Walter as Jacobson
- Wiktor Andersson as Boman
- Artur Rolén as Jansson
- Yngve Nyqvist as Mäster
- Gunnar Höglund as Maskineleven
- Per Bergström as Berggren
- Nils Karlsson as Henrikson

== Bibliography ==
- Qvist, Per Olov & von Bagh, Peter. Guide to the Cinema of Sweden and Finland. Greenwood Publishing Group, 2000.
