= Arne Bornebusch =

Swedish film director and screenwriter (1905–1973)

- Born: December 10, 1905; Hjortsberga, Sweden
- Died: October 13, 1973 (aged 67); Stockholm, Sweden
- Occupation(s): Film director and screenwriter

Arne Folke Harald Bornebusch (December 10, 1905 – October 13, 1973) was a Swedish film director and screenwriter.

== Personal life ==
Bornebusch was born in Hjortsberga, Sweden. He married Annika Backelin, with whom he had a son, Lars Peder Gustaf Rudolf. Bornebusch died in Stockholm in 1973.

== Filmography ==
=== As director ===
==== Feature films ====
- 1935: Skärgårdsflirt
- 1935: Stockholmsmelodi
- 1936: Kvartetten som sprängdes
- 1936: Våran pojke
- 1938: Eli Sjursdotter
- 1938: Sol över Sverige
- 1940: Frestelse
- 1940: Mannen som alla ville mörda
- 1945: Det var en gång...
- 1946: Per Albin svarar – Välkomna till oss
- 1948: De kämpade för sin frihet

==== Short films ====
- 1933: Hur behandlar du din hund
- 1934: Efter kl. 5
- 1934: Nordens Venedig
- 1934: Stockholmskuriosa
- 1935: Manéa, söderhavets son
- 1935: Stockholmsmelodi
- 1939: Olja ur jorden
- 1939: Vintersemester
- 1940s: Vi säljer Luma
- 1940: Loviselunds järnvägar
- 1941: Arbetsblocket Sverige
- 1941: Cyklister på Eriksgata
- 1942: Per Albin regerar
- 1942: Scouter i beredskap
- 1943: Ett lyckat bak
- 1943: Vi
- 1946: Erlander i närbild
- 1946: Nya melodier
- 1946: Välkomna till oss
- 1948: Det hände i arbetet
- 1948: Från lillstuga till storföretag
- 1949: Tambi

=== As screenwriter ===
==== Feature films ====
- 1940: Frestelse
- 1945: Det var en gång...
- 1946: Harald Handfaste

==== Short films ====
- 1934: Efter kl. 5
- 1935: Slalom
- 1942: Scouter i beredskap
- 1943: Ett lyckat bak
- 1943: Vi
- 1948: Från lillstuga till storföretag
- 1948: Jubileumskatalogen berättar
- 1949: Tambi

=== As narrator ===
- 1930: Freund mit Wind und Wolken
- 1934: Stockholmskuriosa
- 1935: Manéa, söderhavets son
- 1935: Mot höjderna
- 1935: Slalom
- 1935: Stockholmsmelodi
- 1935: Vad är klockan?
- 1936: Den vita våren
- 1936: Hantverk med anor – tjärbränning
- 1936: Vårt dagliga knäckebröd
- 1937: Ett sommarkåseri om Norrköping
- 1937: Från Bergslagsbygd till Dalafjäll
- 1938: Våra barn och andras ungar
- 1939: Die schweizer Landsgemeinde
- 1939: Emalj
- 1939: Näktergalen
- 1939: Olja ur jorden
- 1939: Vi går på långtur
- 1939: Vintersemester
- 1940: Fribrottning
- 1940: Det är lång, lång väg ...
- 1940: Loviselunds järnvägar
- 1941: Arbetsblocket Sverige
- 1942: Tandberg – Musina
- 1943: Skogsluffare
- 1943: Vi
- 1943 (?): Oidentifierad Hälsans ABCD
- 1944: Bland kåkar och paletter
