= Art for Art's Sake (film) =

1938 film

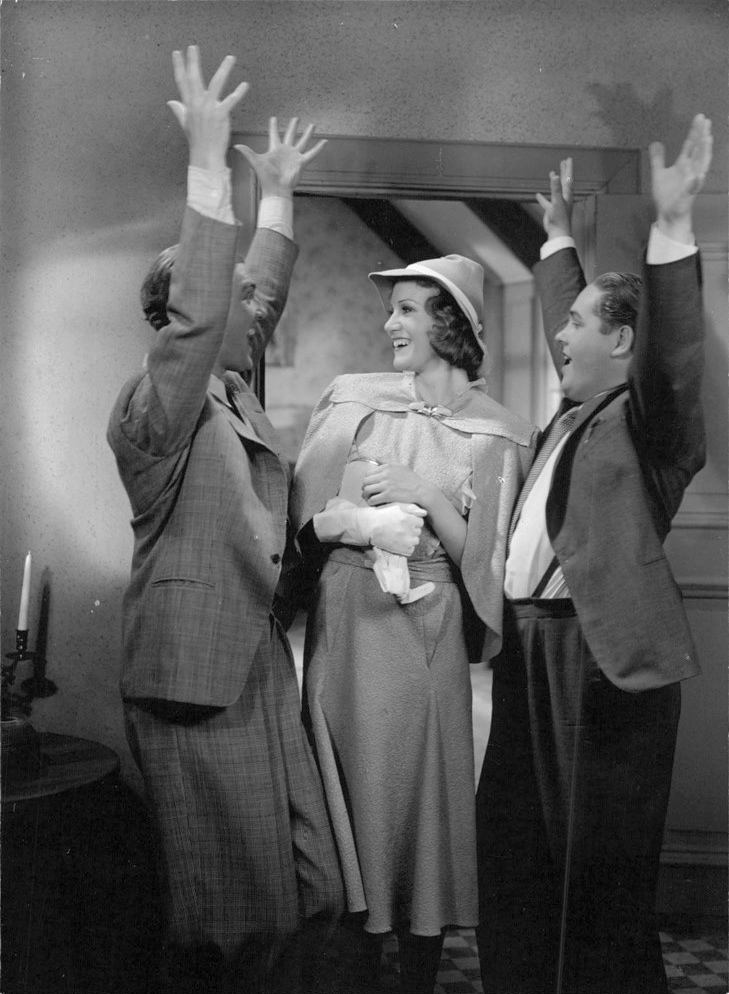
- Still with Aino Taube, Åke Ohberg, and Jussi Björling
- Directed by: Gunnar Skoglund
- Written by: Gunnar Skoglund
- Starring: Jussi Björling; Åke Ohberg; Anders Henrikson
- Cinematography: Martin Bodin
- Edited by: Oscar Rosander
- Music by: Eric Bengtson
- Production company: Svensk Filmindustri
- Distributed by: Svensk Filmindustri
- Release date: 28 March 1938
- Running time: 82 minutes
- Country: Sweden
- Language: Swedish

Art for Art's Sake or Here's to Success (Swedish: Fram för framgång) is a 1938 Swedish drama film directed by Gunnar Skoglund and starring Jussi Björling, Åke Ohberg and Anders Henrikson.

The film's sets were designed by Arne Åkermark.

== Cast ==
- Jussi Björling as Tore Nilsson
- Åke Ohberg as Lasse Berg
- Anders Henrikson as Rövarn
- Erik 'Bullen' Berglund as Torman
- Harry Roeck-Hansen as Engfeldt
- Anders Boman as Pelle Mårtensson
- Bror Bügler as Vadman
- Gösta Cederlund as Theater Manager
- Gösta Gustafson as Hallberg
- Hugo Björne as Chief of Police
- Richard Lund as Music Critic
- Olle Björklund as Pilot
- Aino Taube as Monika Malm

== Bibliography ==
- Bertil Wredlund & Rolf Lindfors. Långfilm i Sverige: 1930-1939. Proprius, 1983.
