= Anders Henrikson =

Swedish actor

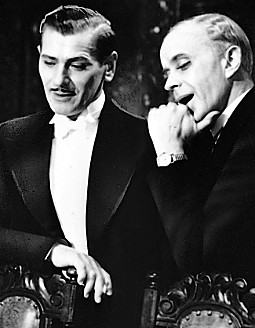
- Henrikson on the right, and Edvin Adolphson on the left in 1940
- Born: Anders Henrik Henrikson; 13 June 1896; Stockholm, Sweden
- Died: 17 October 1965 (aged 69); Stockholm, Sweden
- Occupations: Actor, film director
- Years active: 1913–1965
- Spouses: Mayne Lundgren (m. 1921–1927) Märta Hultgren (m. 1927–1940) Aino Taube (m. 1940)
- Children: Mathias Henrikson (1940–2005); Ella Henrikson (1941–1972); Thomas Henrikson (born 1942)

Anders Henrik Henrikson (13 June 1896 – 17 October 1965) was a Swedish actor and film director. He appeared in more than 50 films between 1913 and 1965. He also directed 30 films between 1933 and 1956.

== Selected filmography ==
=== Actor ===
- The Lady of the Camellias (1925)
- Den starkaste (1929)
- Man's Way with Women (1934)
- Walpurgis Night (1935)
- Intermezzo (1936)
- It Pays to Advertise (1936)
- Russian Flu (1937)
- Conflict (1937)
- Oh, Such a Night! (1937)
- John Ericsson, Victor of Hampton Roads (1937)
- Art for Art's Sake (1938)
- A Woman's Face (1938)
- Styrman Karlssons flammor (1938)
- The Great Love (1938)
- Just a Bugler (1938)
- Thunder and Lightning (1938)
- Her Little Majesty (1939)
- Med livet som insats (1940)
- A Crime (1940)
- Life Goes On (1941)
- Home from Babylon (1941)
- Only a Woman (1941)
- Dangerous Ways (1942)
- The Heavenly Play (1942)
- The Case of Ingegerd Bremssen (1942)
- Dangerous Ways (1942)
- Mister Collins' Adventure (1943)
- I Killed (1943)
- I Am Fire and Air (1944)
- Blood and Fire (1945)
- Tired Theodore (1945)
- The Loveliest Thing on Earth (1947)
- The Key and the Ring (1947)
- Prison (1949)
- Miss Julie (1951)
- Defiance (1952)
- Love (1952)
- Resan till dej (1953)
- The Road to Klockrike (1953)
- Barabbas (1953)
- Sir Arne's Treasure (1954)
- Getting Married (1955)
- The Girl in Tails (1956)
- The Minister of Uddarbo (1957)
- Morianna (1965)

=== Director ===
- He, She and the Money (1936)
- It Pays to Advertise (1936)
- 65, 66 and I (1936)
- Unfriendly Relations (1936)
- Oh, Such a Night! (1937)
- Thunder and Lightning (1938)
- Just a Bugler (1938)
- The Great Love (1938)
- Whalers (1939)
- A Crime (1940)
- The Bjorck Family (1940)
- Life Goes On (1941)
- Only a Woman (1941)
- The Case of Ingegerd Bremssen (1942)
- I Am Fire and Air (1944)
- Mister Collins' Adventure (1943)
- Blood and Fire (1945)
- Tired Theodore (1945)
- The Key and the Ring (1947)
- The Loveliest Thing on Earth (1947)
- Girl from the Mountain Village (1948)
- Getting Married (1955)
- A Doll's House (1956)
