= Tired Theodore (1945 film) =

1945 film

- Directed by: Anders Henrikson
- Written by: Oscar Rydqvist
- Based on: Tired Theodore by Max Ferner and Max Neal
- Starring: Max Hansen; Annalisa Ericson; Tollie Zellman
- Cinematography: Harald Berglund
- Edited by: Emil A. Lingheim
- Music by: Kai Normann Andersen
- Production company: Europa Film
- Distributed by: Europa Film
- Release date: 26 December 1945
- Running time: 106 minutes
- Country: Sweden
- Language: Swedish

Tired Theodore (Swedish: Trötte Teodor) is a 1945 Swedish comedy film directed by Anders Henrikson and starring Max Hansen, Annalisa Ericson and Tollie Zellman. It was shot at the Sundbyberg Studios in Stockholm. The film's sets were designed by the art director Max Linder. It is based on the 1913 German play of the same title by Max Ferner and Max Neal which has been adapted for the screen a number of times.

== Synopsis ==
Theodore is happy about his marriage to his beloved Marianne, but unfortunately his domineering new mother-in-law comes to live with them.

== Cast ==
- Max Hansen as Teodor
- Annalisa Ericson as Marianne
- Tollie Zellman as Mrs. Johansson
- Anders Henrikson as Andersson
- Inga-Bodil Vetterlund as Clary
- Bojan Westin as Eva
- Sven Lindberg as Konrad
- Hilda Borgström as Countess
- Åke Claesson as The President
- Carl Reinholdz as Friend
- Emile Stiebel as Bellini

== Bibliography ==
- Wright, Rochelle. The Visible Wall: Jews and Other Ethnic Outsiders in Swedish Film. SIU Press, 1998.
