= A Woman's Face (1938 film) =

1938 film by Gustaf Molander

- Theatrical release poster
- Directed by: Gustaf Molander
- Screenplay by: Gösta Stevens; Stina Bergman; Ragnhild Prim
- Based on: Il était une fois... 1932 play by Francis de Croisset
- Starring: Ingrid Bergman
- Cinematography: Åke Dahlqvist
- Edited by: Oscar Rosander
- Music by: Eric Bengtson; Jules Sylvain
- Distributed by: Svensk Filmindustri
- Release dates: August 1938 (Venice Film Festival); 31 October 1938 (Sweden); 8 September 1939 (U.S.)
- Running time: 101 minutes
- Country: Sweden
- Language: Swedish

A Woman's Face (Swedish: En kvinnas ansikte) is a 1938 Swedish drama film directed by Gustaf Molander, based on the play Il était une fois... by Francis de Croisset. The cast includes Ingrid Bergman in the lead as a female criminal with a disfigured face.

The film was awarded a Special Recommendation at the 1938 Venice Film Festival for its "overall artistic contribution." It was remade in 1941 by Metro-Goldwyn-Mayer with the same title, starring Joan Crawford.

== Plot ==
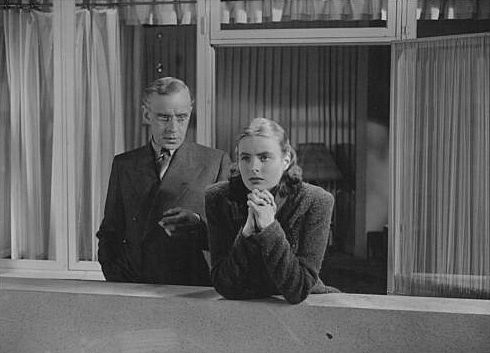
Anders Henrickson and Ingrid Bergman in A Woman's Face

Anna Holm is an embittered woman with a facial disfigurement that distorts her eye and mouth on one side and scars her cheek. She has expressed her alienation from society by becoming part of a criminal gang specialising in blackmail. This gang has two notable operations going as the film starts: they are demanding a large sum from a doctor's wife, Mrs. Wegert, for letters she wrote to a lover, and they are pressuring a rich Consul's dissolute nephew, Torsten Barring, who is entangled in their complex schemes and owes them increasing sums, to murder the little boy, the Consul Magnus Barring's orphan grandson, who stands between him and inheriting the Consul's estate.

To succeed in this, the gang needs a female accomplice to be sent as the little boy's governess and help kill him; they deplore the fact that Anna's face makes her ineligible for this.

Anna goes to Dr. Allan Wegert's house to threaten Mrs. Wegert into paying for the letters; Mrs. Wegert gives her all her jewellery, which she puts in her purse, but it is only half the sum the gang demands. Dr. Wegert comes home, and Anna injures her foot trying to escape through the window. Dr. Wegert finds the jewellery in Anna's purse and, not suspecting she is a blackmailer, takes her for a burglar, but is interested in the problem of her disfigured face. He is a plastic surgeon and has specialised in restoring the faces of men damaged in World War I.

Instead of turning her in, he puts her in his hospital, heals her foot and operates on her face. Mrs. Wegert goes to the hospital to see if Anna will give to her the letters if the surgery is successful. As Anna is taken to Dr. Wegert for removal of the bandages, she gives to Mrs Wegert the letters, asking for nothing in return. The operation is successful, and Anna is beautiful; she is also moved by her talks with Dr. Wegert to become a different person.

Anna is now fit to go north to Forsa, where the Consul's estate is situated, as governess to his grandson, Lars-Erik. She has assumed a new name, Anna Paulsson. Already conflicted about helping Torsten murder the boy, she turns against the idea entirely as she grows to love Lars-Erik and the happy family atmosphere with which the Consul and his servants surround him. A close friend and employee of the family business, Harald Berg, who is treated like a member of the family (Lars-Erik calls him uncle), falls in love with Anna and she with him. The head of Anna's gang and the other members turn up at the hotel in town to urge her to get on with the plan, and Torsten pressures her.

On a winter night sleigh ride, Torsten manages to be in a sleigh alone with Lars-Erik, and whips the horses into running off with it. Anna, in a sleigh with Harald, realises that he means to fake an accident that kills Lars-Erik, and desperately whips up their own horses to pursue them. As they speed along, she confesses the murder plot to Harald and the part she was meant to play in it. They catch up, and Harald snatches Lars-Erik out of Torsten's sleigh, but is thrown from his own sleigh and badly injured. Torsten, dropping his torch on the snow, rides off into the darkness. Anna's gang members hear what has happened, good-naturedly give up on Anna and leave town.

In the aftermath of the murder attempt, Anna is still with the Barring family as governess and Harald is recovering from his injuries. The Consul tells Anna that Harald has resigned from the firm and wants to leave the country to go travelling and convalesce. The Consul is very upset and tells her that he wants Harald to come home to Forsa, where he belongs. He hopes she can persuade him to return. Anna goes to see Harald in the Dr. Wegert's clinic, where he has been moved for treatment, and tells him her life story, including how as a small child her face was burned in a house fire that caused the death of her parents. She became a criminal, but is glad that her former ugliness preserved her from becoming worse. Harald is agonised, but still loves her, and proposes that they go away and start a life together somewhere new. She turns him down for his own good, and he goes back north to Forsa to resume his old life, happily received by Lars-Erik and the family.

Dr. Wegert, whose marriage has broken up without assistance from the gang, is leaving his practice in Sweden to go with the Red Cross to China. He proposes that Anna come with him as a governess to his cousin's child in Beijing, and she gratefully agrees. Vowing to forget the past and start a new life right then, they sail off together.

== Cast ==
- Ingrid Bergman as Anna Holm, aka Anna Paulsson
- Tore Svennberg as Magnus Barring
- Anders Henrikson as Dr. Wegert
- Georg Rydeberg as Torsten Barring
- Gunnar Sjöberg as Harald Berg
- Hilda Borgström as Emma
- Karin Kavli as Mrs. Wegert (credited as Karin Carlson-Kavli)
- Erik 'Bullen' Berglund as Nyman (credited as Erik Berglund)
- Sigurd Wallén as Miller
- Gösta Cederlund as The Count
- Magnus Kesster as Handsome Herman
- Göran Bernhard as Lars-Erik Barring
- Bror Bügler as Georg Mark.
