= Margit Rosengren =

Swedish opera singer

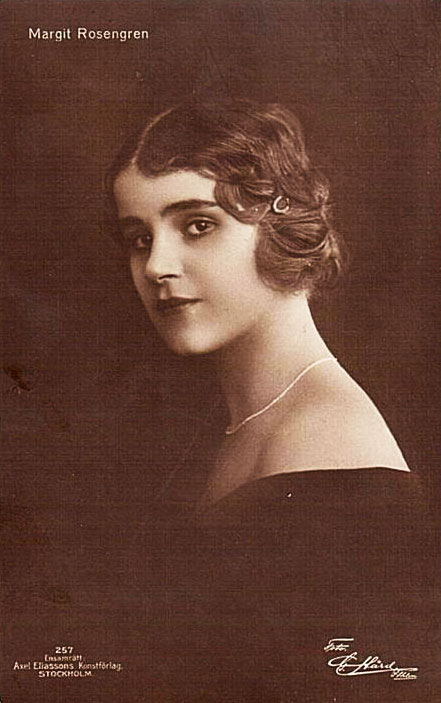
Margit Rosengren (c. 1925)

Margit Ingeborg Rosengren (1901–1952) was a leading Swedish operetta singer in the first half of the 20th century. After studying voice and drama, she was invited by the theatre magnate Albert Ranft to perform at Stockholm's Oscarsteatern. She made her début there in 1920 as the page Pueblo in the operetta Don César de Bazan. She subsequently performed in the Vasa and Odeon theatres and as a guest at the Royal Swedish Opera until her retirement in 1941. She also took part in revues and had a few film roles.

== Biography ==
Born in Stockholm on 17 March 1901, Margit Ingeborg Rosengren was the daughter of the wholesaler Hugo Rosengren and his wife Thérèse née Hallner who had sung in Stockholm's theatres. She had two siblings, an elder brother Kurt and a younger sister who became the film actress Birgit Rosengren. After attending the Södermalm girls' school, she studied voice in 1918–19 under Herman Brag, Haldis Ingebjart Isene and Zulamith Wellander and drama under the actresses Sie Christiernsson and Karin Swanström.

In 1920, she was invited by the theatre magnate Albert Ranft to perform at Stockholm's Oscarsteatern, making her début as Pueblo in Don César de Bazan and receiving an engagement until 1926. After periods with the Vasa Theatre (1927–30) and the Odeon, she returned to the Oscar where she was engaged from 1932 to 1938. Rosengren also performed as a guest in Gothenburg's Stora Teatern in the mid 1920s and from 1939 to 1941 at Stockholm's Royal Opera. She also toured the neighbouring Scandinavian capitals and sang in revues in Stockholm's Circus and Hippodrame theatres.

She is remembered for playing Hanna Glaware in The Merry Widow and Sylva Varescu in Csárdásfurstinnan at the Royal Theatre. Roles at the Vasa Theatre included Mimi in Adjö Mimi, Vera Lisaveta in Sista valsen, La Flamme in Rose-Marie and Anna in Hotell Stadt Lemberg.

Margit Rosengren died in Stockholm on 23 March 1952 and was buried in Solna's Norra begravningsplatsen.
