= Jan Ekström (author) =

Jan Olof Ekström (2 November 1923 – 17 August 2013) was a Swedish author and adman.

== Biography ==
Jan Ekström was born in Falun, Sweden, has lived in Gislaved and graduated in Växjö. He studied national economy, Slavic languages, English and statistics in Lund, thereafter he studied at the Stockholm School of Economics in Stockholm. He was in the beginning of the 80's co-owner of the ad firm "Ekström & Lindmark". He has also lived in Paris, France.

As an author Ekström debuted 1961 with Döden fyller år (The Death's birthday) and the next year he introduced his problem-solver, the red-haired and opera-loving detective Bertil Durell. For Träfracken (The wood tuxedo), he got Expressens Sherlock-award. Ekström is most famous as an author of mystery novels with complicated intrigue, though he has written romans and articles to trade presses. Ekström was also a member of Svenska Deckarakademin (The Swedish detective story academy).

The novel Ålkistan (The eel chest) is claimed to be one of the few Swedish examples of a successful answer on the locked room mystery.

The novels Träfracken and Morianerna have been adapted to film form.

== Bibliography ==
- Döden fyller år (1961)
- Döden går i moln (1962)
- Träfracken (1963) (Also filmed in 1966)
- Morianerna (1964) (Also filmed in 1965)
- Daggormen (1965)
- Ålkistan (1967)
- Elddansen (1970)
- Sagan om kommunen som ville bygga rationellt (1975)
- Ättestupan (1975)
- Mannen i berget (1979)
- Svarta veckan vid Lycée international de St-Germain-en-Laye (1983)
- Blommor till Rose (1986)
- Uniformen (1987)
- Noveller Julen 1989 (1989)
- Vildfikonträdet (1994)

== Prices and awards ==
- Sherlock-priset, 1963
- Svenska Deckarakademin's Grand Master-diploma, 1997

== Sources ==
- Kjell E Genbergs Deckarsidor
- Albert Bonniers förlag
