= Hjortsberga =

- Location within Kronoberg Location within Sweden
- Coordinates: 56°54′47″N 14°27′10″E
- Country: Sweden
- Province: Småland
- County: Kronoberg County
- Municipality: Alvesta Municipality

Area
  - Total: 0.63 km^{2} (0.24 sq mi)

Population (31 December 2010)
  - Total: 245
  - Density: 389/km^{2} (1,010/sq mi)
- Time zone: UTC+1 (CET)
  - Summer (DST): UTC+2 (CEST)

Hjortsberga is a locality situated in Alvesta Municipality, Kronoberg County, Sweden with 245 inhabitants in 2010.
