= Hans-Dieter Roos =

German football manager

Personal information
- Date of birth: 22 May 1937 (age 89)
- Place of birth: Simmern, Germany
- Position: Defender

Senior career*
| Years | Team | Apps | (Gls) |
| 1967–1968 | VfB Marathon Remscheid | | |

Managerial career
- 1972–1975: 1. FC Köln II
- 1975–1976: Eintracht Frankfurt (assistant)
- 1976: Eintracht Frankfurt
- 1977–1978: Eintracht Trier
- 1978–1980: Stuttgarter Kickers
- 1981: ESV Ingolstadt
- 1981: SpVgg Fürth
- 1986–1987: Stuttgarter Kickers II
- 1987–1988: SpVgg Ludwigsburg
- * Club domestic league appearances and goals

Hans-Dieter Roos (born 22 May 1937) is a retired German football manager.
