= Birger Sjöberg =

Swedish poet (1885–1929)

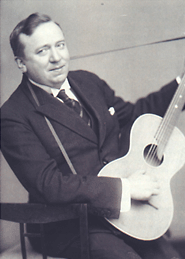
- Sjöberg in the mid-1920s
- Born: 6 December 1885; Vänersborg, Sweden
- Died: 30 April 1929 (aged 43); Växjö, Sweden
- Occupations: poet, novelist, songwriter

Birger Sjöberg (1885–1929) was a Swedish poet, novelist and songwriter, whose best-known works include the faux-naïf song collection Fridas bok (Frida's book) and the novel Kvartetten som sprängdes (The quartet that split up), a somewhat Dickensian relation about stock-exchange gambling in the twenties, and the frantic efforts to recover.

Originally a journalist, Sjöberg wrote songs in his spare time. His debuted as a serious writer with the 1922 publication of Fridas bok (Frida's book), which was both a critical and popular success. Following a series of concert tours, he withdrew from public life and focused on his writing.

After his death in 1929, a new series of songs and a selection of poems were published.

== Selected works ==
Prose and poetry by Birger Sjöberg:

- Fridas bok (Frida's book) 1922
- Kvartetten som sprängdes (The quartet that split up) 1924
- Kriser och kransar (Crises and laurel wreaths) 1926
- Fridas andra Bok (Frida's second book) 1929
- Minnen från jorden (Memories from the Earth) 1940

== Translations of his works in English ==
- Anthology of Swedish Lyrics 1930
- Modern Swedish Poetry Pt. 2 1936
- Scandinavian Songs and Ballads 1950
- Twentieth Century Scandinavian Poetry 1950
- Twelve Pieces from Frida's Book 1975
- When First I Ever Saw You LP 1980
- Swedes on Love CD 1991
- Frida's New Clothes 2008

== His life in English ==
- A History of Swedish Literature 1961
- A History of Swedish Literature 1989
- A History of Swedish Literature 1996

== Image gallery ==
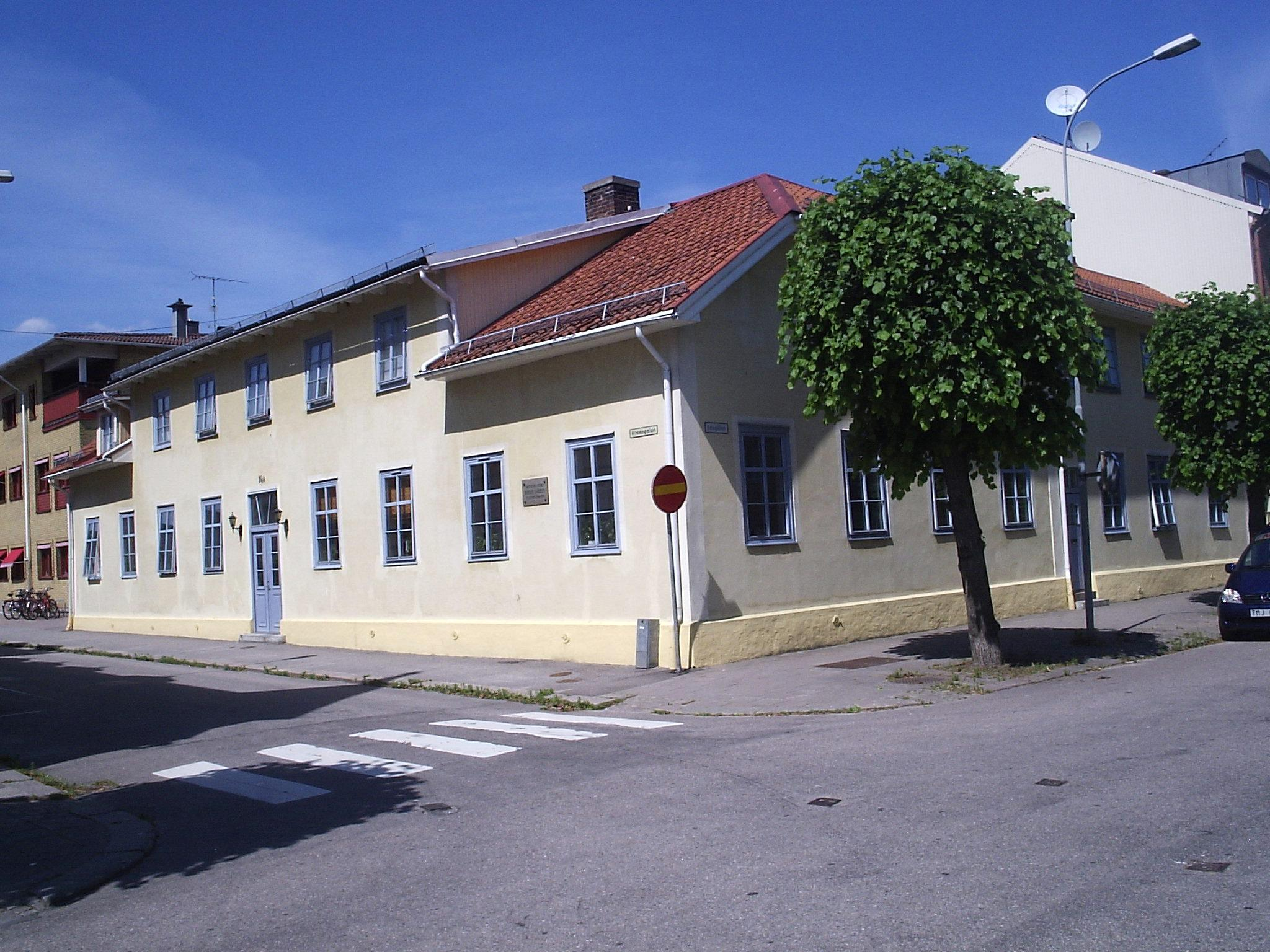
Birger Sjöberg's birthplace in Vänersborg

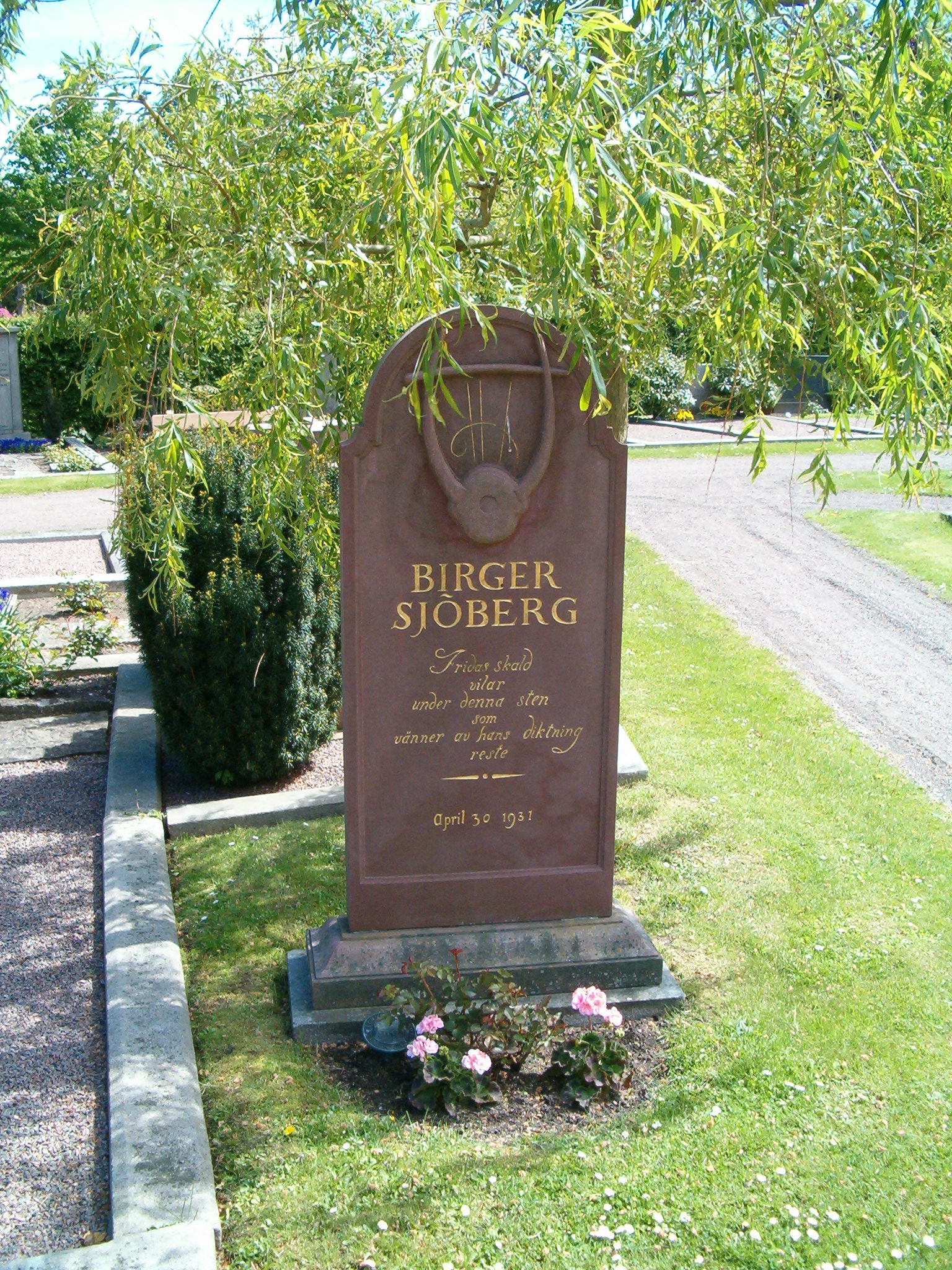
Birger Sjöberg's grave at the Donation Cemetery in Helsingborg

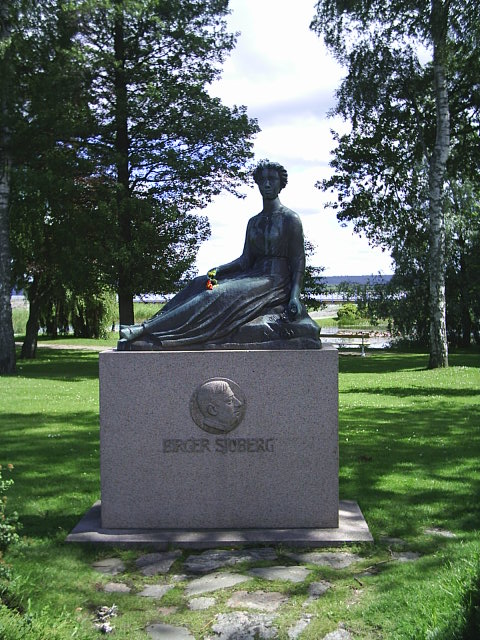
Frida statue in Vänersborg

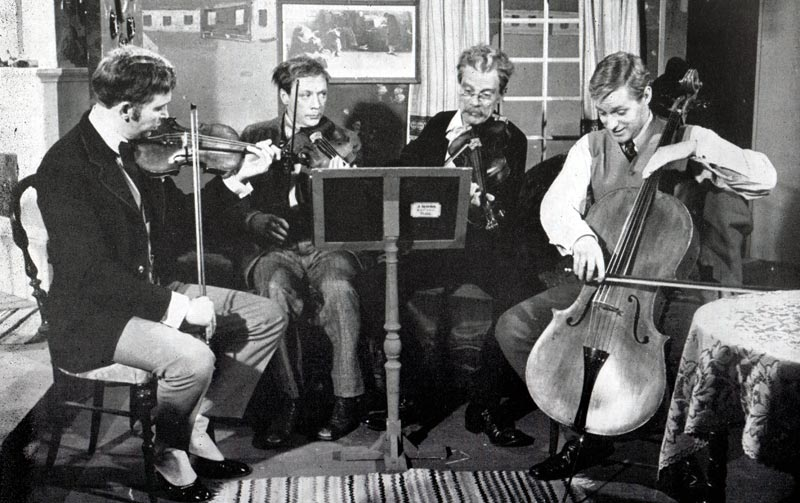
The Quartet That Split Up 1962

== See also ==
- Swedish ballad tradition
