= Lorens Marmstedt =

Swedish film producer

- Born: Sigfrid Lorens Eriksson; 29 October 1908; Stockholm, Sweden
- Died: 4 April 1966 (aged 57); Stockholm, Sweden
- Occupations: Film producer, film director
- Years active: 1932–1965
- Spouses: Astrid Carlson (m. 1933–1935) Marie-Louise Sorbon (m. 1937) Ellen Rasch (m. 1950–1956) Gio Petré (m. 1962)
- Children: 2 (with Petré)

Lorens Marmstedt, né Sigfrid Lorens Eriksson (29 October 1908 – 4 April 1966) was a Swedish film producer. He produced more than 50 films between 1932 and 1965.

== Selected filmography ==
- The Love Express (1932)
- A Stolen Waltz (1932)
- Perhaps a Poet (1933)
- Eva Goes Aboard (1934)
- The Atlantic Adventure (1934)
- The Marriage Game (1935)
- Shipwrecked Max (1936)
- The Girls of Uppakra (1936)
- The Two of Us (1939)
- Between Us Barons (1939)
- The Bjorck Family (1940)
- A Crime (1940)
- Life Goes On (1941)
- Woman on Board (1941)
- Sonja (1943)
- The Sixth Shot (1943)
- Imprisoned Women (1943)
- His Excellency (1944)
- We Need Each Other (1944)
- The Girl and the Devil (1944)
- Crime and Punishment (1945)
- It Rains on Our Love (1946)
- Interlude (1946)
- A Ship to India (1947)
- Dinner for Two (1947)
- Music in Darkness (1948)
- Prison (1949)
- Girl with Hyacinths (1950)
- The Yellow Squadron (1954)
- Whoops! (1955)
- Stage Entrance (1956)
- A Lion in Town (1959)
- Summer and Sinners (1960)
- The Cats (1965)
- Nightmare (1965)
- Woman of Darkness (1966)
- Ormen (1966)
