= June Night =

1940 Swedish film directed by Per Lindberg

- Danish film poster
- Directed by: Per Lindberg
- Written by: Tora Nordström-Bonnier; Ragnar Hyltén-Cavallius; Per Lindberg
- Starring: Ingrid Bergman; Marianne Löfgren; Lill-Tollie Zellman; Marianne Aminoff
- Cinematography: Åke Dahlqvist
- Edited by: Oscar Rosander
- Music by: Gunnar Johansson; Jules Sylvain
- Distributed by: Svensk Filmindustri
- Release date: 3 April 1940
- Running time: 88 minutes
- Country: Sweden
- Language: Swedish

June Night (Swedish: Juninatten) is a 1940 Swedish language drama film directed by Per Lindberg. It stars Ingrid Bergman and Marianne Löfgren.

== Plot summary ==
A woman, involved with a sailor, is shot by him after trying to leave him. She survives, but as a result of this incident the press portray her as a tramp. To escape the press, she moves from her small home town to the big city of Stockholm, where the press eventually catch up with her.

== Cast ==
- Ingrid Bergman ... Kerstin Nordbäck - aka Sara Nordanå
- Marianne Löfgren... Åsa
- Lill-Tollie Zellman ... Jane Jacobs
- Marianne Aminoff ... Nickan Dahlin
- Olof Widgren ... Stefan von Bremen
- Gunnar Sjöberg ... Nils Asklund
- Gabriel Alw ... Professor Tillberg
- Olof Winnerstrand ... Count
- Sigurd Wallén ... Editor-in-Chief Johansson-Eldh - aka 'Röken'
- Hasse Ekman ... Willy Wilson - Journalist
- Maritta Marke ... Miss Vanja - Journalist
- Gudrun Brost ... Mrs. Nilsson, telephone operator
- John Botvid ... Gurkan
- Karin Swanström ... Mrs. Cronsiöö
- Carl Ström ... Doctor Berggren
