= Hans Strååt =

Swedish actor

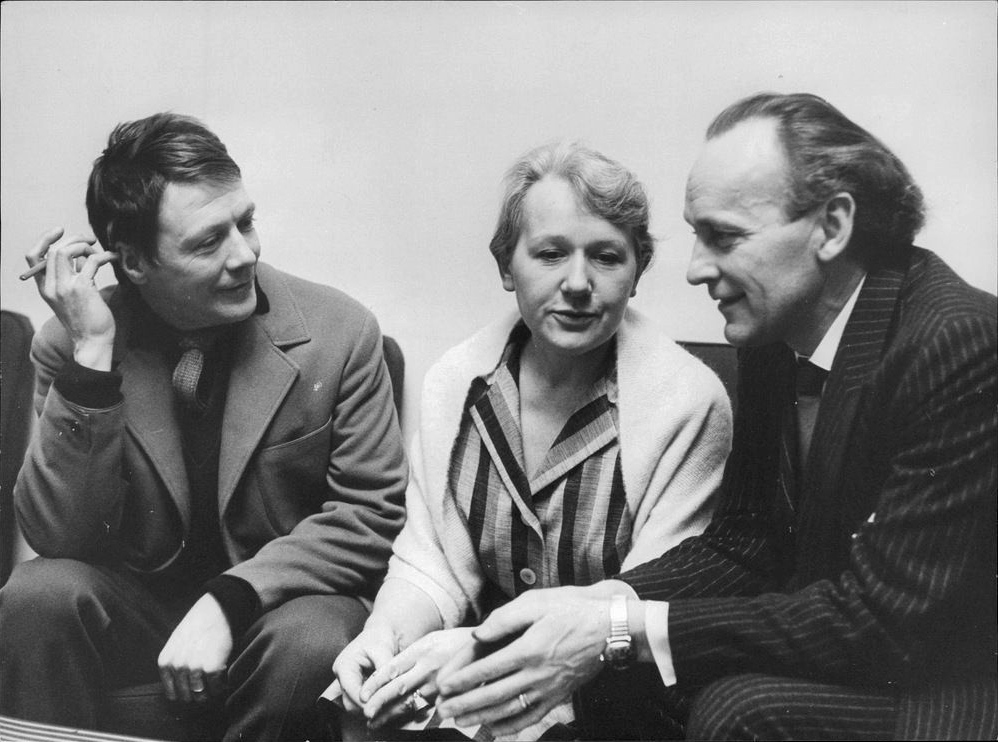
- Hans Strååt (right), with Allan Edwall and Sif Ruud in 1962
- Born: Hans Olof Strååt; 17 October 1917; Stockholm, Sweden
- Died: 26 January 1991 (aged 73); Lidingö, Sweden
- Occupation: Actor
- Years active: 1941–1987
- Spouse: Marianne Karlbeck (m. 1949)
- Children: Jannika Strååt

Hans Olof Strååt (17 October 1917 – 26 January 1991) was a Swedish film actor. He appeared in 60 films between 1941 and 1987.

== Partial filmography ==
- Bright Prospects (1941) - Student
- Scanian Guerilla (1941) - Guerilla soldier (uncredited)
- General von Döbeln (1942) - Löjtnant Wilhelm von Döbeln
- Ride Tonight! (1942) - Peasant (uncredited)
- The Sin of Anna Lans (1943) - Helge Kjellgren
- Kungsgatan (1943) - Barrskiöld (uncredited)
- En dag skall gry (1944) - Löjtnant Löwenskjöld
- Kungajakt (1944) - Gentleman
- Appassionata (1944) - Gösta
- Kärlekens kors (1946) - Konsul Sandvik
- Restless Blood (1946) - Valter (in Swedish-language version)
- The Night Watchman's Wife (1947) - Doctor (uncredited)
- Kvarterets olycksfågel (1947) - Berg (uncredited)
- Port of Call (1948) - Mr. Vilander
- Loffe the Tramp (1948) - Public prosecutor
- Stora Hoparegränd och himmelriket (1949) - Salvation Army soldier
- Jack of Hearts (1950) - Wilhelm Canitz
- Barabbas (1953) - Simon from Cyrene (uncredited)
- Our Father and the Gypsy (1954) - Efraim
- Seger i mörker (1954) - Albin Dalén
- Sir Arne's Treasure (1954) - Captain
- Mord, lilla vän (1955) - Martin Eriksson
- The Unicorn (1955) - Harriet's Father
- Smiles of a Summer Night (1955) - Adolf Almgren, photographer (uncredited)
- Flicka i kasern (1955) - Captain
- A Doll's House (1956) - Second mate (uncredited)
- Rätten att älska (1956) - Söderberg
- Det är aldrig för sent (1956) - Art Dealer
- Girls Without Rooms (1956) - Manager
- Sista natten (1956) - The Man
- Tarps Elin (1956) - Vicar
- Vägen genom Skå (1957) - Artist
- The Halo Is Slipping (1957) - Yngve Englund
- Värmlänningarna (1957) - Rik-Ola
- Fridolf Stands Up! (1958) - Fridh
- The Jazz Boy (1958) - Teaterregissören
- Miss April (1958) - Baecke
- No Time to Kill (1959) - Inspector Bergman
- Pirates on the Malonen (1959) - Konrad Schalén
- Loving Couples (1964) - Thomas Meller
- Vindingevals (1968) - Gertson
- The Bookseller Gave Up Bathing (1969) - Vicar
- The Shot (1969) - Ronny's Father
- Fanny and Alexander (1982) - Clergyman at Wedding - Ekdahlska huset
- Raskenstam (1983) - Leonard Johansson
- Två solkiga blondiner (1984) - Axel
- Love Me! (1986) - Larsson
- Mio in the Land of Faraway (1987) - The Spirit / Kato's Spy (Swedish version, voice)
- Nionde kompaniet (1987) - Arvid Jönsson
