= Carl Ström =

Swedish actor (1888–1957)

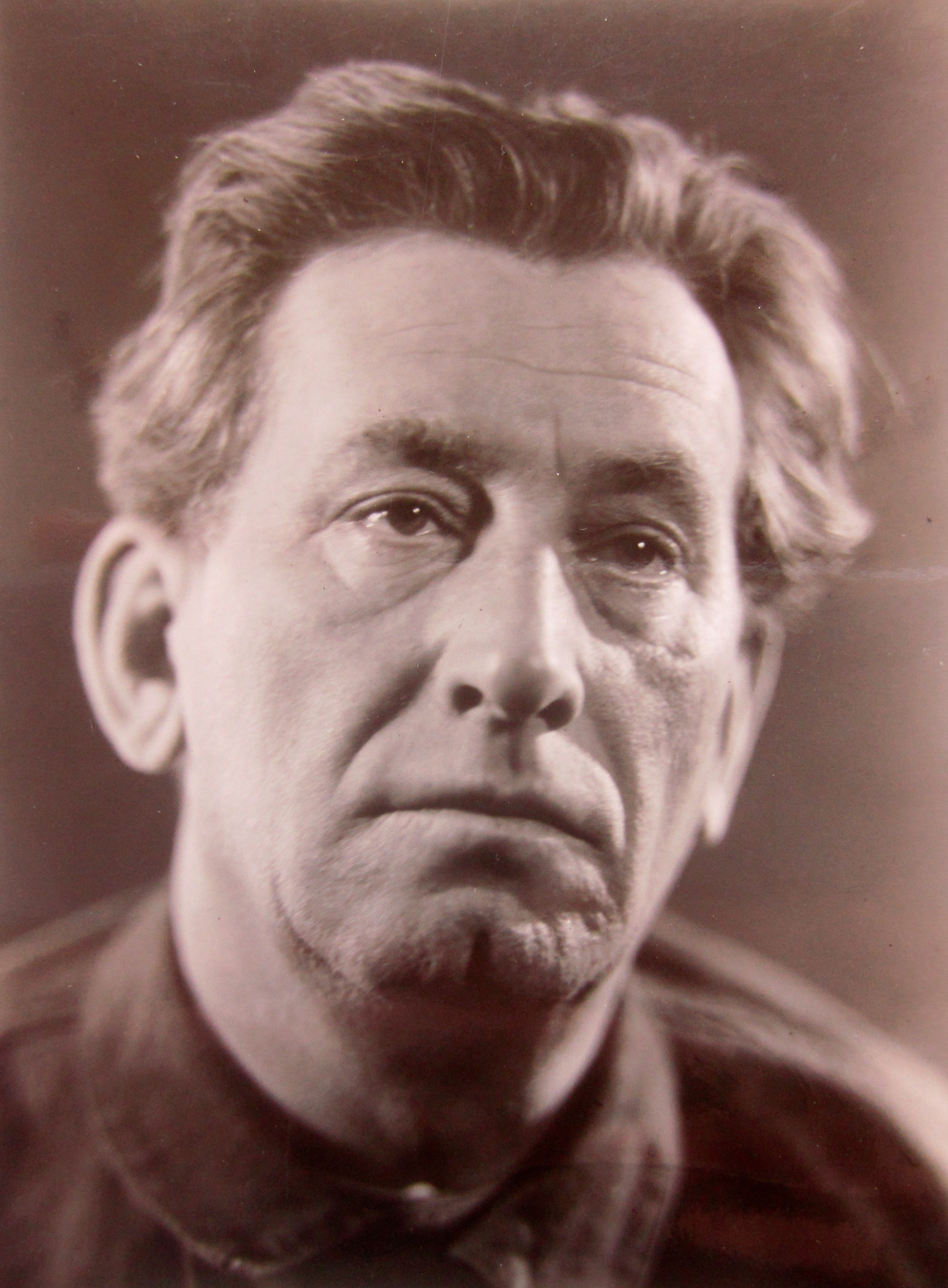
- Born: Carl Johan Vilhelm Ström; 18 June 1888; Härnösand, Sweden
- Died: 18 November 1957 (aged 69); Stockholm, Sweden
- Occupation: Actor
- Years active: 1923–1955

Carl Johan Vilhelm Ström (18 June 1888 – 18 November 1957) was a Swedish film actor. He appeared in more than 100 films between 1923 and 1955.

== Selected filmography ==
- Iron Wills (1923)
- Gustaf Wasa (1928)
- Cavaliers of the Crown (1930)
- His Life's Match (1932)
- Man's Way with Women (1934)
- The Atlantic Adventure (1934)
- Melody of the Sea (1934)
- Walpurgis Night (1935)
- Ocean Breakers (1935)
- Adventure (1936)
- South of the Highway (1936)
- Johan Ulfstjerna (1936)
- Conscientious Objector Adolf (1936)
- The Andersson Family (1937)
- John Ericsson, Victor of Hampton Roads (1937)
- Sara Learns Manners (1937)
- Dollar (1938)
- Circus (1939)
- Kalle's Inn (1939)
- The People of Högbogården (1939)
- June Nights (1940)
- Hanna in Society (1940)
- The Talk of the Town (1941)
- The Fight Continues (1941)
- Bright Prospects (1941)
- Goransson's Boy (1941)
- Scanian Guerilla (1941)
- The Train Leaves at Nine (1941)
- Ride Tonight! (1942)
- Tomorrow's Melody (1942)
- The Case of Ingegerd Bremssen (1942)
- It Is My Music (1942)
- Night in Port (1943)
- The Brothers' Woman (1943)
- There's a Fire Burning (1943)
- Imprisoned Women (1943)
- The Emperor of Portugallia (1944)
- We Need Each Other (1944)
- His Excellency (1944)
- The Old Clock at Ronneberga (1944)
- The Girl and the Devil (1944)
- The Invisible Wall (1944)
- Oss tjuvar emellan eller En burk ananas (1945)
- Widower Jarl (1945)
- Sunshine Follows Rain (1946)
- When the Meadows Blossom (1946)
- Brita in the Merchant's House (1946)
- Dynamite (1947)
- The People of Simlang Valley (1947)
- The Night Watchman's Wife (1947)
- The Girl from the Marsh Croft (1947)
- Främmande hamn (1948)
- Robinson in Roslagen (1948)
- Eva (1948)
- I Am with You (1948)
- On These Shoulders (1948)
- Lars Hård (1948)
- The Quartet That Split Up (1950)
- While the City Sleeps (1950)
- Divorced (1951)
- All the World's Delights (1953)
- The Beat of Wings in the Night (1953)
- Simon the Sinner (1954)
- Paradise (1955)
- The Girl in the Rain (1955)
- The Light from Lund (1955)
- Uncle's (1955)
