= Two Women (1947 film) =

1947 film

- Film poster
- Directed by: Arnold Sjöstrand
- Written by: Torsten Quensel; Roger Richebé
- Based on: Women's Prison; 1931 novel by Francis Carco
- Produced by: Hilmer Peters
- Starring: Eva Dahlbeck; Cécile Ossbahr; Gunnar Björnstrand
- Cinematography: Karl-Erik Alberts
- Edited by: Eric Nordemar
- Music by: Sune Waldimir
- Production company: Wivefilm
- Distributed by: Wivefilm
- Release date: 19 October 1947
- Running time: 96 minutes
- Country: Sweden
- Language: Swedish

Two Women (Swedish: Två kvinnor) is a 1947 Swedish drama film directed by Arnold Sjöstrand and starring Eva Dahlbeck, Cécile Ossbahr and Gunnar Björnstrand. It is a remake of the 1938 French film Women's Prison which itself was based on a novel by Francis Carco. It was entered into the 1947 Cannes Film Festival.

The film's sets were designed by the art director Bertil Duroj. It was shot at the Centrumateljéerna Studios in Stockholm and on location around the city including prison scenes at the Långholmen Prison.

== Synopsis ==
After unjustly serving time in prison for murder, a young woman attempts to lead an honest life on her release.

== Cast ==
- Eva Dahlbeck as Sonja Bergman
- Cécile Ossbahr as Cecilia Alling
- Gunnar Björnstrand as Bengt
- Georg Rydeberg as Henry Alling
- Arnold Sjöstrand as John Martins
- Marianne Löfgren as Helen Sinner
- Naima Wifstrand as Cecilia's Foster-Mother
- Arthur Fischer as Cecilia's Foster-Father
- Nils Hallberg as Nisse
- Lasse Krantz as Victor
- Linnéa Hillberg as Guard-lady at prison
- Torsten Hillberg as Constable
- Viveka Linder as Miss Gren
- Nils Ohlin as West
- Artur Rolén as Porter at hotel
- Tord Stål as Count
- Ivar Wahlgren as Doctor

== Bibliography ==
- Larsson, Mariah & Marklund, Anders. Swedish Film: An Introduction and Reader. Nordic Academic Press, 2010.
