= Åke Claesson =

Swedish actor

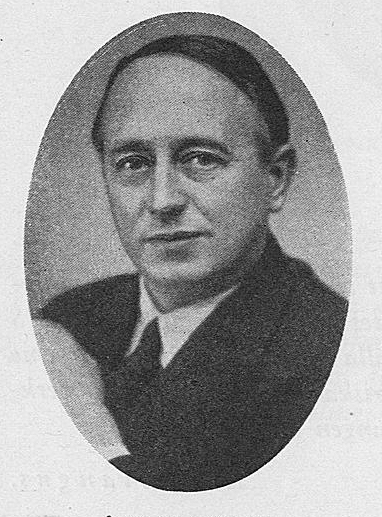
- Born: 2 July 1889; Stockholm, Sweden
- Died: 29 May 1967 (aged 77); Stockholm, Sweden
- Occupation: Actor
- Years active: 1925-1962

Åke Claesson (2 July 1889 – 29 May 1967) was a Swedish film actor. He appeared in more than 60 films between 1925 and 1962.

== Selected filmography ==
- Två konungar (1925) - Carl Michael Bellman
- Ulla, My Ulla (1930) - Carl Michael Bellman
- The Bjorck Family (1940) - Karl (uncredited)
- A Crime (1940) - Dr. Forenius
- Life Goes On (1941) - Librarian (uncredited)
- The Ghost Reporter (1941) - Opera Director Fridell (uncredited)
- Dunungen (1941) - Borgström
- Vårat gäng (1942) - Lindgren (uncredited)
- En sjöman i frack (1942) - Captain
- Flames in the Dark (1942) - Dr. Lundvall (uncredited)
- The Case of Ingegerd Bremssen (1942) - Procecutor (uncredited)
- Sun Over Klara (1942) - Carl Michael Bellman
- Adventurer (1942) - Dr. Schonæus
- General von Döbeln (1942) - Prästen
- Ta hand om Ulla (1942) - Dr. Hjalmar Brander (uncredited)
- Ungdom i bojor (1942) - Senior Lecturer
- Nothing Is Forgotten (1942) - Professor Torin (uncredited)
- The Heavenly Play (1942) - Profet Jeremiah
- Kvinnan tar befälet (1942) - Hospital doctor (uncredited)
- Imprisoned Women (1943) - Doctor (uncredited)
- She Thought It Was Him (1943) - Publisher
- Young Blood (1943) - Lars-Erik Hermansson
- Hans majestäts rival (1943) - Carl Michael Bellman
- Gentleman with a Briefcase (1943) - Recording Clerk
- Aktören (1943) - Prästen
- Kungajakt (1944) - Commissioner
- Appassionata (1944) - Prison Director Nils Holmqvist (uncredited)
- Släkten är bäst (1944) - Dr. Hasselman
- I Am Fire and Air (1944) - Ahrman, Jenny's Father
- Vändkorset (1944) - Fredrik Klipping
- Maria of Kvarngarden (1945) - Judge
- Flickor i hamn (1945) - Chairman
- Black Roses (1945) - Christian Lind, gardener
- Jagad (1945) - Dr. Nordenson (uncredited)
- I som här inträden... (1945) - Dr. Karling
- The Serious Game (1945) - Roslin
- Tired Theodore (1945) - The President
- The Journey Away (1945) - Doctor Löfberg
- Ödemarksprästen (1946) - Carl von Linne
- Desire (1946) - Doctor
- Iris and the Lieutenant (1946) - Oscar Motander
- Hotell Kåkbrinken (1946) - Pontus Hallman
- Onda ögon (1947) - Doctor
- Maria (1947) - Gus Pettersson
- The Night Watchman's Wife (1947) - Baron
- Neglected by His Wife (1947) - Chief Editor
- Music in Darkness (1948) - Augustin Schröder
- Sunshine (1948) - Jörgen Bure
- Eva (1948) - Fredriksson
- Two Stories Up (1950) - Chief Physician
- Ung och kär (1950) - Foreign affairs advisor
- Miss Julie (1951) - Doctor
- Sköna Helena (1951) - Marcellus
- The Road to Klockrike (1953) - Waterhead's Father
- Seger i mörker (1954) - Professor Wijkander
- Young Summer (1954) - Christian Carlström
- Karin Månsdotter (1954) - Svante Sture
- Gabrielle (1954) - Malmrot
- People of the Finnish Forests (1955) - Doctor Remberg
- Paradise (1955) - Doctor Martin
- Night Child (1956) - Judge
- My Passionate Longing (1956) - Nina's Father
- Do You Believe in Angels? (1961) - Torsten Waller
