= Gunnar Sjöberg =

Swedish actor

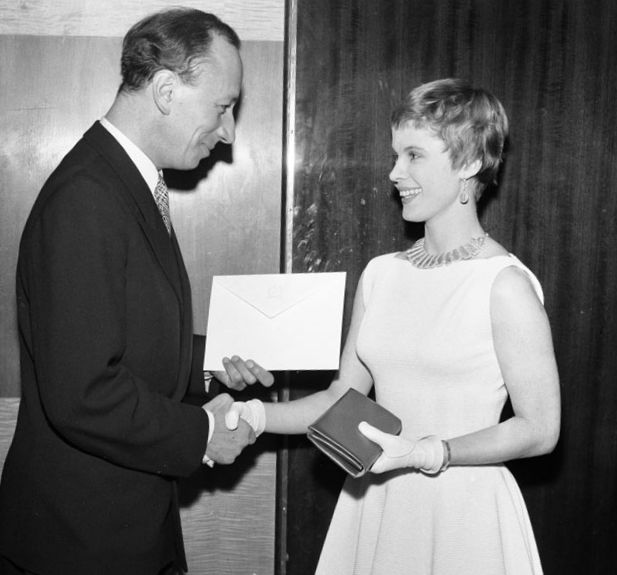
- Skandia Cinemas. Actress Bibi Andersson receives Daniel Engdahl's scholarship of SEK 2,000 from Gunnar Sjöberg, 1957.
- Born: 25 March 1909; Stockholm, Sweden
- Died: 8 June 1977 (aged 68); Sweden
- Years active: 1937-1966

Gunnar Sjöberg (25 March 1909 – 8 June 1977) was a Swedish film actor.

== Selected filmography ==
- Russian Flu (1937) - Delegat från Sundsvall (uncredited)
- John Ericsson, Victor of Hampton Roads (1937) - Seaman
- Styrman Karlssons flammor (1938) - Smuggler (uncredited)
- A Woman's Face (1938) - Harald Berg
- Variety Is the Spice of Life (1939) - Guest at the birthday party (uncredited)
- Gläd dig i din ungdom (1939) - Helgo
- Whalers (1939) - Tore, sailor (uncredited)
- Emilie Högquist (1939) - Knut Almlöf
- Stål (1940) - Lars Gouveng
- June Night (1940) - Nils Asklund
- With Open Arms (1940) - Lawyer (uncredited)
- Gentlemannagangstern (1941) - Doctor (uncredited)
- Landstormens lilla argbigga (1941) - Engineer
- Första divisionen (1941) - Kapten Hansson
- Goransson's Boy (1941) - Göran Bryhme, Pelle's father (uncredited)
- Woman on Board (1941) - Blomqvist
- Scanian Guerilla (1941) - Långe-Tuve
- The Case of Ingegerd Bremssen (1942) - Dr. Ivarsson
- General von Döbeln (1942) - En officer
- Ride Tonight! (1942) - Foreign peasant
- The Heavenly Play (1942) - God's Angel (uncredited)
- I brist på bevis (1943) - Defense lawyer
- Men of the Navy (1943) - Ingeniör Kärre
- Elvira Madigan (1943) - Lt. Frans
- Prästen som slog knockout (1943) - Artist
- Imprisoned Women (1943) - Pastor Brobäck
- Life and Death (1943) - Sergeant Lundblad
- En flicka för mej (1943) - Narrator (voice, uncredited)
- I Killed (1943) - Martin
- The Brothers' Woman (1943) - Nicklas Botvide
- His Excellency (1944) - Max Karbe
- Den heliga lögnen (1944) - Axel Dehlin
- Prince Gustaf (1944) - Carl Nyraeus
- The Rose of Tistelön (1945) - Arnman senior, Arves far
- Black Roses (1945) - Harald Vestermark
- The Serious Game (1945) - Baron Freutiger
- Barnen från Frostmofjället (1945) - Vicar
- Youth in Danger (1946) - Bo Wärn
- The Night Watchman's Wife (1947) - Managing Director (uncredited)
- Sin (1948) - Martin Alm
- Two Stories Up (1950) - Reverend
- Sabotage (1952) - Panter - Resistance Leader
- Han glömde henne aldrig (1952) - Nilsson
- Barabbas (1953) - Supervisor at Copper Mine on Cyprus (uncredited)
- The Shadow (1953) - Doctor
- The Great Adventure (1953) - Narrator (Anders as an adult) (voice)
- Seger i mörker (1954) - Gustaf De Laval
- Salka Valka (1954) - Narrator (voice, uncredited)
- Sir Arne's Treasure (1954) - King Johan III
- Den glade skomakaren (1955) - Hjalmar Hjalle Ek
- Seventh Heaven (1956) - Fader Bernhard Svanström, präst i Assisi
- The Staffan Stolle Story (1956) - Herr Lefverhielm
- Night Light (1957) - Narrator / Policeman (uncredited)
- Synnöve Solbakken (1957) - Doctor
- Wild Strawberries (1957) - Sten Alman / The Examiner
- A Goat in the Garden (1958) - Fabian
- Brink of Life (1958) - Dr. Nordlander
- Playing on the Rainbow (1958) - Prosecutor
- The Die Is Cast (1960) - Leonard Brett
- The Devil's Eye (1960) - Marquis Giuseppe Maria de Macopanza
- Do You Believe in Angels? (1961) - Karl-Evert Raeder
- Hällebäcks gård (1961) - Johan
- Pärlemor (1961) - Priest
- Hide and Seek (1963) - Felici
