= Bertil Duroj =

Swedish art director

- Born: 20 November 1893; Södertälje, Sweden
- Died: 15 June 1967 (aged 73); Råsunda, Sweden
- Occupation: Art director
- Years active: 1923–1961 (film)

Bertil Duroj (1893–1967) was a Swedish art director. Active in the Swedish film industry he designed the sets for more than a hundred productions during his career. These included The Yellow Clinic (1942).

== Selected filmography ==
- The People of Simlang Valley (1924)
- Kärlek och landstorm (1931)
- The Österman Brothers' Virago (1932)
- The Love Express (1932)
- A Wedding Night at Stjarnehov (1934)
- Shipwrecked Max (1936)
- Mother Gets Married (1937)
- The Pale Count (1937)
- Adolf Saves the Day (1938)
- A Cruise in the Albertina (1938)
- Home from Babylon (1941)
- Fransson the Terrible (1941)
- Only a Woman (1941)
- If I Could Marry the Minister (1941)
- In Paradise (1941)
- The Talk of the Town (1941)
- Doctor Glas (1942)
- Tomorrow's Melody (1942)
- Nothing Is Forgotten (1942)
- The Yellow Clinic (1942)
- Dangerous Ways (1942)
- Take Care of Ulla (1942)
- She Thought It Was Him (1943)
- Captured by a Voice (1943)
- Gentleman with a Briefcase (1943)
- Mister Collins' Adventure (1943)
- The Brothers' Woman (1943)
- Young Blood (1943)
- Eaglets (1944)
- Appassionata (1944)
- The Forest Is Our Heritage (1944)
- Count Only the Happy Moments (1944)
- Guttersnipes (1944)
- Sextetten Karlsson (1945)
- Maria of Kvarngarden (1945)
- The Serious Game (1945)
- Motherhood (1945)
- Harald the Stalwart (1946)
- Peggy on a Spree (1946)
- Between Brothers (1946)
- Incorrigible (1946)
- Two Women (1947)
- The Night Watchman's Wife (1947)
- The Bride Came Through the Ceiling (1947)
- Loffe the Tramp (1948)
- Åsa-Nisse (1949)
- Åsa-Nisse Goes Hunting (1950)
- Perhaps a Gentleman (1950)
- Åsa-Nisse på nya äventyr (1952)
- Åsa-Nisse on Holiday (1953)
- Speed Fever (1953)
- Woman in a Fur Coat (1958)
- Miss April (1958)
- Blackjackets (1959)
- Lovely Is the Summer Night (1961)

== Bibliography ==
- Laura, Ernesto G. Tutti i film di Venezia, 1932–1984. La Biennale, Settore cinema e spettacolo televisivo, 1985.
