= Only a Woman (1941 film) =

1941 film

- Directed by: Anders Henrikson
- Written by: Jules Sylvain; Anders Henrikson; Paul Baudisch; Adolf Schütz
- Starring: Karin Ekelund; Arnold Sjöstrand; Karin Kavli
- Cinematography: Elner Åkesson
- Music by: Lars-Erik Larsson
- Production company: Wivefilm
- Distributed by: Wivefilm
- Release date: 15 September 1941
- Running time: 79 minutes
- Country: Sweden
- Language: Swedish

Only a Woman (Swedish: Bara en kvinna) is a 1941 Swedish comedy film directed by Anders Henrikson and starring Karin Ekelund, Arnold Sjöstrand and Karin Kavli. It was shot at the Centrumateljéerna Studios in Stockholm. The film's sets were designed by the art director Bertil Duroj.

== Synopsis ==
A an absent-minded lawyer forgets that it is his wedding anniversary and doesn't come home to the special dinner his wife has prepared. Her friend Maud persuades her to attend a masquerade party in the company of an art professor. When she loses money at cards he agrees to let her off so long as she poses for a portrait.

== Cast ==
- Karin Ekelund as Eva Juren
- Arnold Sjöstrand as Tore Stenwall
- Anders Henrikson as Ivar Juren
- Karin Kavli as Maud Grane
- Eva Henning as Anna-Lisa
- Hilding Gavle as 'Cesar'
- Erik Berglund as Amos Lundbäck
- Marianne Löfgren as Mrs. Törnestad
- Hjördis Petterson as Mrs. Pettersson
- Olav Riégo as Wessman
- Artur Cederborgh as Johansson, guest at the masquerade
- Eivor Engelbrektsson as Sigrid, housemaid
- Mona Mårtenson as Journalist
- Yngve Nyqvist as Chief inspector Gustavsson
- Willy Peters as Andersson, accused
- Gösta Bodin as Napoleon, guest at the masquerade
- Sven-Bertil Norberg as Hellberg, lawyer
- Sickan Castegren as Olga Lundbäck
- Georg Skarstedt as District attorney
- Tord Stål as Secretary
- Hugo Björne Judge
- Douglas Håge as Factory owner
- Ragnar Widestedt as Rural Court Judge
- Annika Tretow as Art student
- Agda Helin as Assistant in flowershop
- Sven-Eric Gamble as Boy at the newspaper
- Elsa Ebbesen as Cook at the Juréns
- Eva Dahlbeck as Guest at the masquerade
- Wiktor Andersson as Guest at the masquerade
- Lillebil Kjellén as Dinner guest at the Juréns

== Bibliography ==
- Qvist, Per Olov & von Bagh, Peter. Guide to the Cinema of Sweden and Finland. Greenwood Publishing Group, 2000.
