= Kungsgatan =

Kungsgatan (Swedish: "The King's Street") is a common name for major streets in Swedish cities, the three most well-known being:

- Kungsgatan, Stockholm
- Kungsgatan, Gothenburg
- Kungsgatan, Malmö
- Kungsgatan,_Uppsala

== See also ==
- Kungsgatan metro station, an early name for the station now known as Hötorget in Stockholm, Sweden
- Kungsgatan (film), a 1943 Swedish film
