= Elvira Madigan (1943 film) =

1943 film

- Directed by: Åke Ohberg
- Written by: Harald Beijer; Karl Ragnar Gierow
- Produced by: Ragnar Arvedson
- Starring: Eva Henning; Åke Ohberg; Irma Christenson
- Distributed by: Europa Film
- Release date: 1943
- Running time: 108 minutes
- Country: Sweden
- Language: Swedish

Elvira Madigan is a 1943 Swedish romantic drama film directed by Åke Ohberg. The film is based on the famous true story of Elvira Madigan. The film stars Ohberg and Eva Henning. The film's sets were designed by the art director Max Linder.

== Cast ==
- Eva Henning as Elvira Madigan
- Åke Ohberg as Count Christian, lieutenant
- Irma Christenson as Antoinette, Christians wife
- Gunnar Sjöberg as Frans, lieutenant
- Marianne Löfgren as Mrs. von Scharfen
- Ragnar Arvedson as Cavalry captain von Scharfen
- Jullan Kindahl as Trine, Elviras mother
- Otto Landahl as Mikael, Elviras father, a clown
- Bror Bügler as Cavalry captain von Stern
- Sven Bergvall as Colonel
- Olav Riégo as Major Emmerich
- Sven Lindberg as Lieutenant Ehrencreutz
