= Hilding Gavle =

Swedish actor

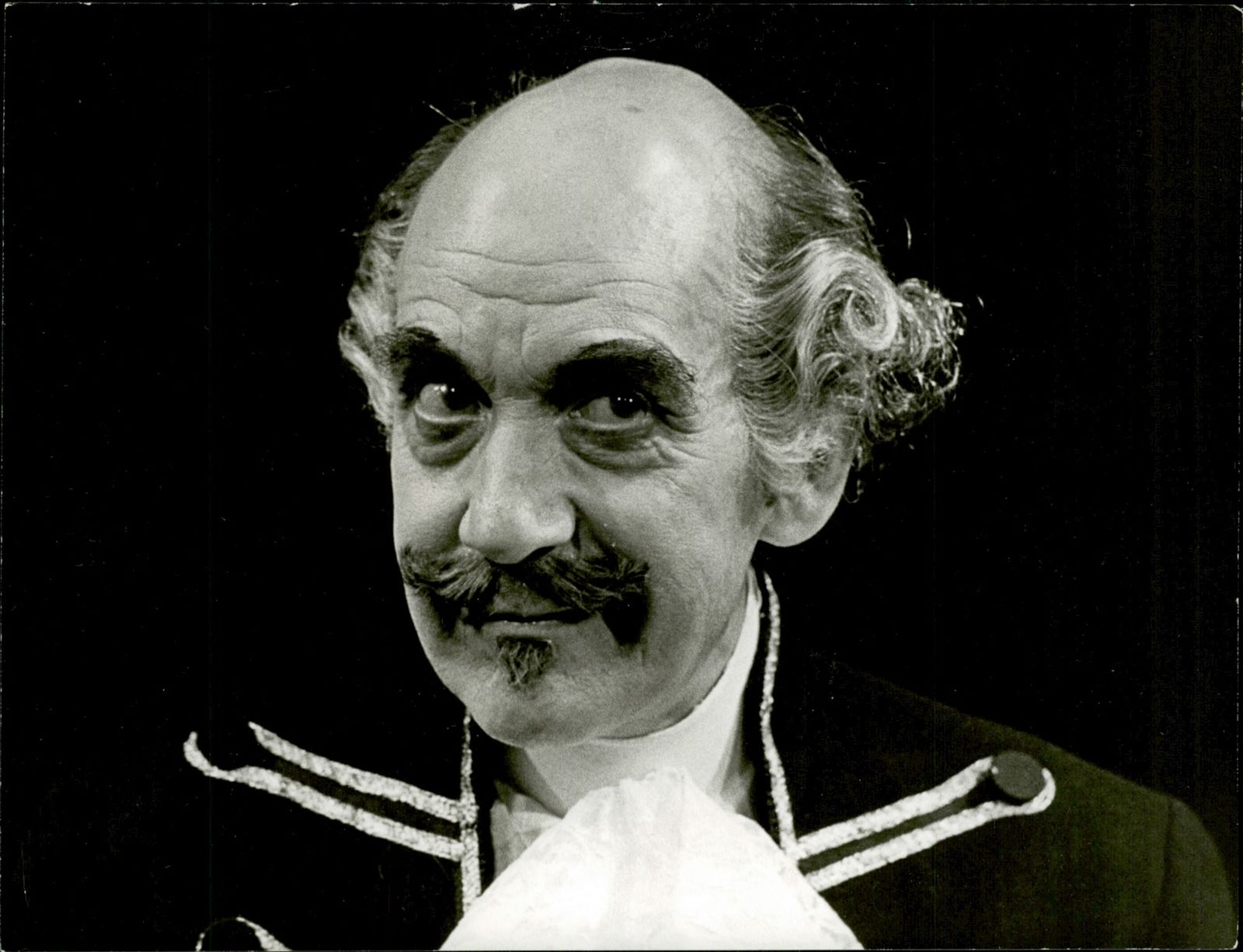
- Gavle in 1964
- Born: 28 August 1901; Kalmar, Sweden
- Died: 4 August 1969 (aged 67); Stockholm, Sweden
- Occupation: Actor
- Years active: 1930–1968

Hilding Gavle (28 August 1901 – 4 August 1969) was a Swedish actor. He appeared in over forty films between 1930 and 1968.

== Selected filmography ==
- Frida's Songs (1930)
- Kungen kommer (1936)
- Conscientious Objector Adolf (1936)
- The Andersson Family (1937)
- The Pale Count (1937)
- Adolf Saves the Day (1938)
- Between Us Barons (1939)
- Emilie Högquist (1939)
- Nothing But the Truth (1939)
- Blossom Time (1940)
- The Poor Millionaire (1941)
- Lucky Young Lady (1941)
- In Paradise (1941)
- The Talk of the Town (1941)
- Only a Woman (1941)
- The Ghost Reporter (1941)
- Löjtnantshjärtan (1942)
- En trallande jänta (1942)
- Adventurer (1942)
- She Thought It Was Him (1943)
- I Am Fire and Air (1944)
- Oss tjuvar emellan eller En burk ananas (1945)
- Wandering with the Moon (1945)
- His Majesty Must Wait (1945)
- The Balloon (1946)
- Poor Little Sven (1947)
- Flickan från tredje raden (1949)
- Ett resande teatersällskap (1961)
- Hemsöborna (1966)
