= Gabriel Alw =

Swedish actor (1889–1946)

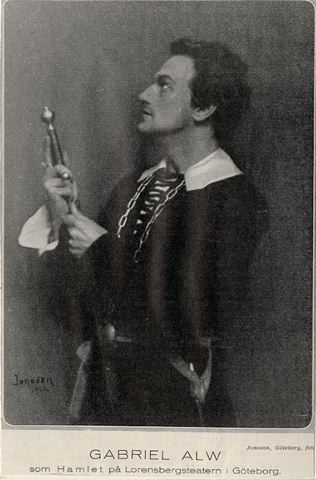
- Born: 25 December 1889; Eskilstuna, Sweden
- Died: 9 November 1946 (aged 56); Stockholm, Sweden
- Occupation: Actor
- Years active: 1915-1946

Gabriel Alw (25 December 1889 – 9 November 1946) was a Swedish film actor. He appeared in more than 30 films between 1915 and 1946.

== Selected filmography ==
- The Price of Betrayal (1915)
- Ingmar's Inheritance (1925)
- To the Orient (1926)
- Walpurgis Night (1935)
- June Nights (1940)
- If I Could Marry the Minister (1941)
- There's a Fire Burning (1943)
- I Killed (1943)
- Kristin Commands (1946)
- The Bells of the Old Town (1946)
