= Emilie Högquist (film) =

1939 film

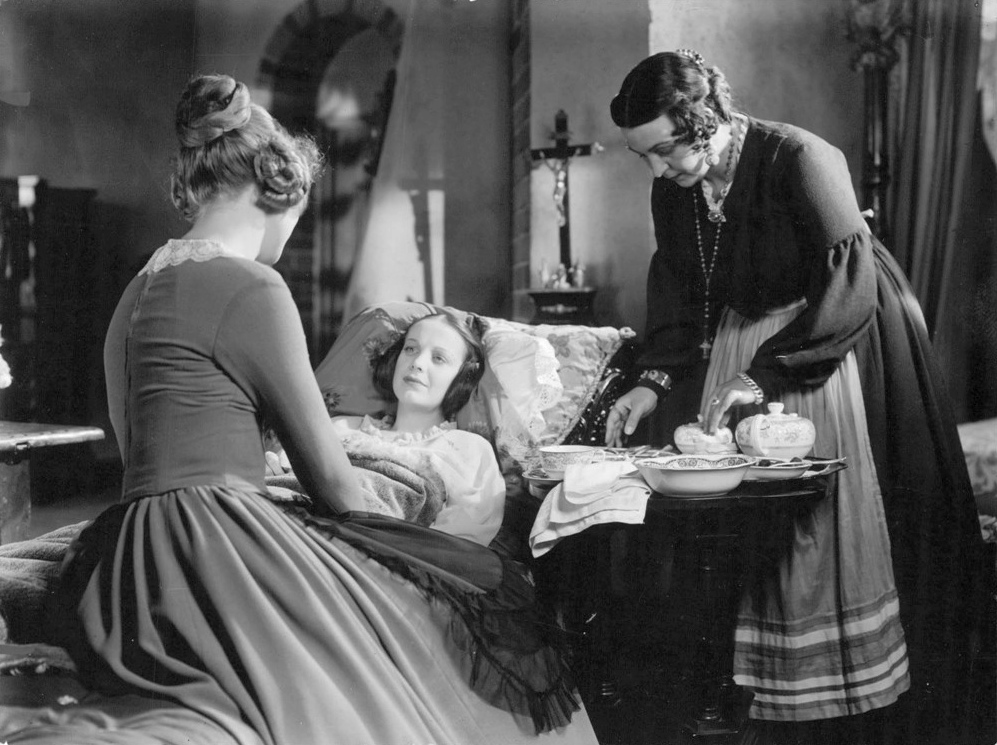
- Still with Irma Christenson and Signe Hasso
- Directed by: Gustaf Molander
- Written by: Gustaf Molander; Gösta Stevens
- Starring: Georg Rydeberg; Signe Hasso; Anna Lindahl
- Cinematography: Julius Jaenzon
- Edited by: Edvin Hammarberg
- Music by: Jules Sylvain
- Production company: Svensk Filmindustri
- Distributed by: Svensk Filmindustri
- Release date: 26 December 1939
- Running time: 110 minutes
- Country: Sweden
- Language: Swedish

Emilie Högquist is a 1939 Swedish historical drama film directed by Gustaf Molander and starring Georg Rydeberg, Signe Hasso, and Anna Lindahl. It portrays the life of the 19th-century actress Emilie Högquist. The film was a commercial failure, and its production company Svensk Filmindustri suffered its largest financial losses of the decade.

The film's art direction was done by Arne Åkermark.

== Main cast ==
- Georg Rydeberg as Prince Oscar
- Signe Hasso as Emelie Högqvist
- Anna Lindahl as Hanna Högqvist
- Sture Lagerwall as Jean Högqvist
- Tollie Zellman as Mrs. Högqvist
- Karl-Arne Holmsten as Christer Örnclou
- Georg Løkkeberg as Arthur Bloomfield
- Björn Berglund as August Blanche
- Bengt Djurberg as Wilhelm von Braun
- Elsa Burnett as Princess Josephine
- Irma Christenson as Marianne Berend
- Olof Winnerstrand as Baron von Brinkman
- Sven Bergvall as Col. Fleming
- Anna-Lisa Baude as Mrs. Grönlund
- Hilding Gavle as Claes Stjernholm
- Elsa Ebbesen as Kristin
- Hugo Björne as Westerstrand
- Karin Alexandersson as Fina
- Olav Riégo as Johan
- Gunnar Sjöberg as Knut Almlöf
