= Marianne Löfgren =

Swedish actress

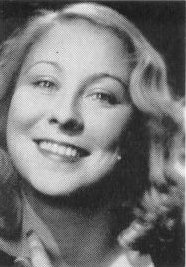
- Born: Jeannette Wedday Marianne Ida Carolina Löfgren; 24 February 1910; Stockholm, Sweden
- Died: 4 September 1957 (aged 47); Stockholm, Sweden
- Occupation: Actor
- Years active: 1933–1956
- Spouse(s): Tycho Bergvall (1936–1957)

Marianne Löfgren (24 February 1910 – 4 September 1957) was a Swedish actress. She played in Åke Ohberg's Elvira Madigan (1943), director Ingmar Bergman's debut Crisis in 1946, Hasse Ekman's Girl with Hyacinths (1950) and in over a hundred other films in her native Sweden.

== Selected filmography ==
- The Dangerous Game (1933)
- What Do Men Know? (1933)
- Man's Way with Women (1934)
- The Lady Becomes a Maid (1936)
- Styrman Karlssons flammor (1938)
- The Great Love (1938)
- Landstormens lilla Lotta (1939)
- Only One Night (1939)
- Nothing But the Truth (1939)
- With Open Arms (1940)
- The Poor Millionaire (1941)
- Only a Woman (1941)
- Fransson the Terrible (1941)
- The Talk of the Town (1941)
- Man glömmer ingenting (1942)
- Dangerous Ways (1942)
- The Case of Ingegerd Bremssen (1942)
- Nothing Is Forgotten (1942)
- Elvira Madigan (1943)
- Kungsgatan (1943)
- Mister Collins' Adventure (1943)
- She Thought It Was Him (1943)
- Som du vill ha mej (1943)
- I Killed (1943)
- A Girl for Me (1943)
- Imprisoned Women (1943)
- Little Napoleon (1943)
- I Am Fire and Air (1944)
- The Emperor of Portugallia (1944)
- Vandring med månen (1945)
- The Rose of Tistelön (1945)
- Motherhood (1945)
- Crisis (1946)
- While the Door Was Locked (1946)
- Affairs of a Model (1946)
- Incorrigible (1946)
- The Balloon (1946)
- Two Women (1947)
- The Loveliest Thing on Earth (1947)
- Dynamite (1947)
- A Swedish Tiger (1948)
- Sunshine (1948)
- Life at Forsbyholm Manor (1948)
- Prison (1949)
- Woman in White (1949)
- The Street (1949)
- Girl with Hyacinths (1950)
- Knockout at the Breakfast Club (1950)
- Fiancée for Hire (1950)
- The Kiss on the Cruise (1950)
- The Quartet That Split Up (1950)
- Perhaps a Gentleman (1950)
- Divorced (1951)
- My Name Is Puck (1951)
- Customs Officer Bom (1951)
- Defiance (1952)
- Salka Valka (1954)
- Time of Desire (1954)
- Simon the Sinner (1954)
- Young Summer (1954)
- Whoops! (1955)
- Egen ingång (1956)
- Girls Without Rooms (1956)
- Night Child (1956)
