= I Am Fire and Air =

1944 film

- Directed by: Anders Henrikson
- Written by: Barbro Alving; Fritz Thorén
- Starring: Viveca Lindfors; Stig Järrel; Olof Widgren
- Cinematography: Olle Nordemar
- Edited by: Lennart Wallén
- Music by: Eric Bengtson
- Production company: Nordfilm
- Distributed by: Sandrew-Baumanfilm AB
- Release date: 7 September 1944
- Running time: 122 minutes
- Country: Sweden
- Language: Swedish

I Am Fire and Air (Swedish: Jag är eld och luft) is a 1944 Swedish drama film directed by Anders Henrikson and starring Viveca Lindfors, Stig Järrel and Olof Widgren. It was shot at the Centrumateljéerna Studios in Stockholm and at the city's Grand Hotel. The film's sets were designed by the art director Bibi Lindström. The film premiered in Sweden on September 7, 1944, at the Royal cinema in Stockholm and the Grand cinema in Uppsala. The title is taken from a line in William Shakespeare's play Antony and Cleopatra.

== Cast ==
- Viveca Lindfors as Jenny Ahrman
- Stig Järrel as Pharmacist Edvind Franzen
- Anders Henrikson as Hegert
- Olof Widgren as Sven Dahl
- Hasse Ekman as Tore Ekström
- Olof Winnerstrand as Lennart Broberg
- Hilda Borgström as Augusta Condé
- Linnéa Hillberg as Mrs. Ahrman
- Åke Claesson as Ahrman, Jenny's Father
- Britta Brunius as Clara
- Jullan Kindahl as Mrs. Frida Sundelin
- Stina Ståhle as Actress at the theatre
- Hilding Gavle as Helge Brenner
- Kolbjörn Knudsen as Actor at the theatre
- Carl-Gunnar Wingård as Actor at the theatre
- Olga Appellöf as Ester, maid
- Renée Björling as Miss Schultze
- Bellan Roos as Linnéa
- Margaretha Bergström as Greta Linden
- Göran Bernhard as Jenny's Son
- Gösta Gustafson as Erik Jans
- Emmy Albiin as Old woman selling flowers
- Karin Alexandersson as Café hostess
- Carl Deurell as Party guest
- Lars Ekborg as Helmsman
- Erik Forslund as Janitor
- Axel Högel as Veterinary
- Stig Johanson as Shop assistant
- Marianne Löfgren as Harlot
- Erik A. Petschler as Prompter
- Aurore Palmgren as Nurse

== Bibliography ==
- Qvist, Per Olov & von Bagh, Peter. Guide to the Cinema of Sweden and Finland. Greenwood Publishing Group, 2000.
