= Maria of Kvarngarden =

1945 film

- Directed by: Arne Mattsson
- Written by: Gunnar Tannefors
- Produced by: Sven Nygren
- Starring: Edvin Adolphson; Viveca Lindfors; Irma Christenson
- Cinematography: Karl-Erik Alberts
- Music by: Gunnar Johansson; Jules Sylvain
- Production company: Film AB Lux
- Distributed by: Film AB Lux
- Release date: 15 January 1945
- Running time: 88 minutes
- Country: Sweden
- Language: Swedish

Maria of Kvarngarden (Swedish: Maria på Kvarngården) is a 1945 Swedish drama film directed by Arne Mattsson and starring Edvin Adolphson, Viveca Lindfors and Irma Christenson. It was shot at the Centrumateljéerna Studios in Stockholm and on location in Uppsala. The film's sets were designed by the art director Bertil Duroj.

== Cast ==
- Edvin Adolphson as Birger Jern
- Viveca Lindfors as Maria
- Irma Christenson as Birgit Jern
- Linnéa Hillberg as Barbro
- Åke Grönberg as Jakob
- Ernst Eklund as Major Lundgren
- Henrik Schildt as Erik Lundgren
- Guje Lagerwall as Karin
- John Botvid as John Gröndal
- Rune Carlsten as Defence Lawyer
- Åke Claesson as Judge
- Willy Peters as District Attorney
- Anders Nyström as Nils
- Axel Högel as Vicar

== Bibliography ==
- Qvist, Per Olov & von Bagh, Peter. Guide to the Cinema of Sweden and Finland. Greenwood Publishing Group, 2000.
