= The Love Express (1932 film) =

1932 film

- Directed by: Lorens Marmstedt
- Written by: Gösta Rybrant
- Produced by: Lorens Marmstedt
- Starring: Isa Quensel; Einar Axelsson; Nils Ohlin
- Cinematography: Adrian Bjurman
- Edited by: Adrian Bjurman
- Music by: Karl Wehle
- Production company: Wemarfilm
- Distributed by: Publikfilm
- Release date: 31 October 1932
- Running time: 85 minutes
- Country: Sweden
- Language: Swedish

The Love Express (Swedish: Kärleksexpressen) is a 1932 Swedish drama film directed by Lorens Marmstedt and starring Isa Quensel, Einar Axelsson and Nils Ohlin. The film's sets were designed by the art director Bertil Duroj.

== Cast ==
- Isa Quensel as Detective's Niece
- Einar Axelsson as Weber
- Nils Ohlin as Adolf
- Anna Lindahl as Hilma
- Lili Ziedner as Rich Widow
- Eric Abrahamsson as Detective
- Anna-Lisa Baude
- Doris Nelson

== Bibliography ==
- Qvist, Per Olov & von Bagh, Peter. Guide to the Cinema of Sweden and Finland. Greenwood Publishing Group, 2000.
