= Miss April (1958 film) =

1958 film

- Directed by: Göran Gentele
- Written by: Göran Gentele
- Produced by: Olle Brunaeus
- Starring: Gunnar Björnstrand; Lena Söderblom; Jarl Kulle; Gaby Stenberg
- Cinematography: Karl-Erik Alberts
- Edited by: Wic Kjellin
- Production company: Europa Film
- Distributed by: Europa Film
- Release date: 3 November 1958
- Running time: 98 minutes
- Country: Sweden
- Language: Swedish

Miss April (Swedish: Fröken April) is a 1958 Swedish comedy film directed by Göran Gentele and starring Gunnar Björnstrand, Lena Söderblom and Gaby Stenberg. It was shot at the Sundbyberg Studios in Stockholm. The film's sets were designed by the art directors Bertil Duroj and Arne Åkermark. It was entered into the 1959 Cannes Film Festival.

== Synopsis ==
In Stockholm, Marcus a banker falls in love with the ballet dancer Maj who performs in the opera and gets himself a job working there. However, she is in love with the opera's star singer Osvald Berg and tries to get Marcus to help her gain his interest.

== Cast ==
- Gunnar Björnstrand as Marcus Arwidson
- Lena Söderblom as Maj Bergman
- Jarl Kulle as Osvald Berg
- Gaby Stenberg as Vera Stenberg
- Douglas Håge as Chorus master
- Hjördis Petterson as Mrs. Berg
- Meg Westergren as Anna
- Lena Madsén as Siri
- Olof Sandborg as Head of the Opera
- Sif Ruud as Mrs. Nilsson
- Birgitta Valberg as Ms. Holm, secretary
- Per Oscarsson as Sverker Ek
- Sven Holmberg as Malmnäs
- Björn Gustafson as Director of the opera
- Georg Skarstedt as Stage Manager
- Bengt Eklund as Hink
- Börje Mellvig as Prosecutor
- Hans Strååt as Baecke
- Tord Stål as Judge
- Kurt Bendix as Opera Conductor
- Carl-Axel Hallgren as Policeman
- Ivar Wahlgren as Theatre janitor
