= The Serious Game (film) =

1945 film

- Directed by: Rune Carlsten
- Written by: Lars Tessing; Rune Carlsten
- Based on: The Serious Game by Hjalmar Söderberg
- Produced by: Stellan Claësson
- Starring: Viveca Lindfors; John Ekman; Olof Widgren
- Cinematography: Karl-Erik Alberts
- Edited by: Rune Carlsten
- Music by: Gunnar Johansson
- Production company: Film AB Lux
- Distributed by: Film AB Lux
- Release date: 26 November 1945
- Running time: 106 minutes
- Country: Sweden
- Language: Swedish

The Serious Game (Swedish: Den allvarsamma leken) is a 1945 Swedish period drama film directed by Rune Carlsten and starring Viveca Lindfors, John Ekman and Olof Widgren. It was shot at the Centrumateljéerna Studios in Stockholm. The film's sets were designed by the art director Bertil Duroj. It is based on the 1912 novel of the same title by Hjalmar Söderberg.

== Synopsis ==
At the turn of the twentieth century, Arvid and Lydia are in love. However, his poor financial circumstances lead her to marry a wealthy, much older man instead. Arvid also gets married soon. Many years later, they meet again. Their passion for each other is still alive, and both are unhappy in their marriage.

== Cast ==
- Viveca Lindfors as Lydia Stille
- John Ekman as Anders Stille, hennes far
- Olof Widgren as Arvid Stjärnblom
- Åke Claesson as Roslin
- Eva Dahlbeck as Dagmar Randel
- Gösta Cederlund as Redaktör Markel
- Josua Bengtson as Grosshandlar Randel
- Hjördis Petterson as Hans hustru
- Hugo Björne as Chefredaktör Doncker
- Gunnar Sjöberg as Baron Freutiger
- Ulf Palme as Ture Törne
- Renée Björling as Ester Roslin
- Carl Deurell as Arvid's Father
- Gösta Holmström as Captain Linde
- Sven Lindberg as Lovén
- Ruth Weijden as Augusta, Stille's Maid
- Birger Malmsten as Kaj Lidner
- Per Oscarsson as Filip Stille, Lydia's Brother
- Yngve Nyqvist as Randel's Guest
- Sven-Eric Gamble as Young Man at the Party
- Inga-Lill Åhström as Guest at Doncker's Party

== Bibliography ==
- Goble, Alan. The Complete Index to Literary Sources in Film. Walter de Gruyter, 1999.
- Qvist, Per Olov & von Bagh, Peter. Guide to the Cinema of Sweden and Finland. Greenwood Publishing Group, 2000.
