= Arnold Sjöstrand =

Swedish actor

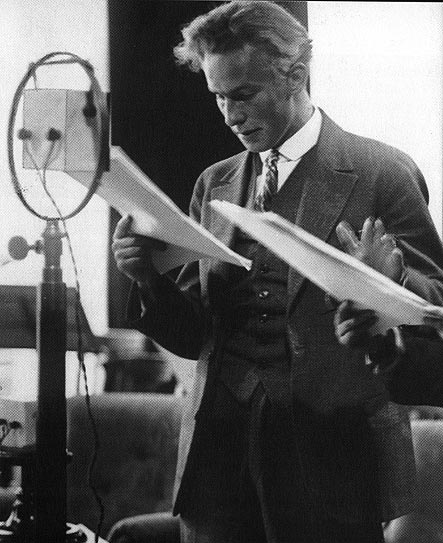
- Born: Nils Arnold Sjöstrand; 30 June 1903; Sundbyberg, Sweden
- Died: 1 February 1955 (aged 51); Malmö, Sweden
- Occupations: Actor; Film director
- Years active: 1923-1952

Arnold Sjöstrand (30 June 1903 – 1 February 1955) was a Swedish actor and film director. He appeared in more than 30 films between 1931 and 1952.

== Selected filmography ==
- Flickan från Värmland (1931)
- It Pays to Advertise (1936)
- The People of Bergslagen (1937)
- Blossom Time (1940)
- Home from Babylon (1941)
- The Talk of the Town (1941)
- Only a Woman (1941)
- If I Could Marry the Minister (1941)
- The Heavenly Play (1942)
- The Yellow Clinic (1942)
- I Killed (1943)
- The Sin of Anna Lans (1943)
- The Brothers' Woman (1943)
- Count Only the Happy Moments (1944)
- The Rose of Tistelön (1945)
- Incorrigible (1946)
- Two Women (1947)
- No Way Back (1947)
- Sin (1948)
- Sunshine (1948)
- A Swedish Tiger (1948)
- Stronger Than the Law (1951)
- Encounter with Life (1952)
