= Nothing Is Forgotten =

1942 film

- Directed by: Åke Ohberg
- Written by: Marika Stiernstedt (novel); Torsten Lundqvist; John Albert Wemmerlöv
- Starring: Edvin Adolphson; Gerd Hagman; Marianne Löfgren
- Cinematography: Julius Jaenzon
- Edited by: Lennart Wallén
- Music by: Dag Wirén
- Production company: Sveafilm
- Distributed by: Sveafilm
- Release date: 16 December 1942
- Running time: 91 minutes
- Country: Sweden
- Language: Swedish

Nothing Is Forgotten (Swedish: Man glömmer ingenting) is a 1942 Swedish drama film directed by Åke Ohberg and starring Edvin Adolphson, Gerd Hagman and Marianne Löfgren. It was shot at the Centrumateljéerna Studios in Stockholm. The film's sets were designed by the art director Bertil Duroj.

== Synopsis ==
When Nora's father dies she goes to live her uncle Berthold, encounter the jealousy of his wife Alice. She studies to become a painter.

== Cast ==
- Edvin Adolphson as Berthold Segervind
- Gerd Hagman as Nora
- Marianne Löfgren as Alice
- Peter Höglund as Johan
- Viran Rydkvist as Sofi
- Åke Grönberg as Blommen
- Hugo Björne as Nora's Father
- Julia Cæsar as Miss Kattentitt
- Olga Andersson as Mrs. Beerg
- Åke Claesson as Professor Torin
- Anders Frithiof as Wick
- Olav Riégo as Dr. Beerg
- Signe Wirff as Mina
- Sif Ruud as Anna
- Wiktor Andersson as Newspaper Vendor
- Ann-Margret Bergendahl as Maid
- Märta Dorff as Dinner guest
- Georg Fernqvist as Dinner guest
- Bengt Ekerot as Student at art school
- Elsie Albiin as Student at art school

== Bibliography ==
- Qvist, Per Olov & von Bagh, Peter. Guide to the Cinema of Sweden and Finland. Greenwood Publishing Group, 2000.
