= Anna Lindahl =

Swedish actress (1904–1952)

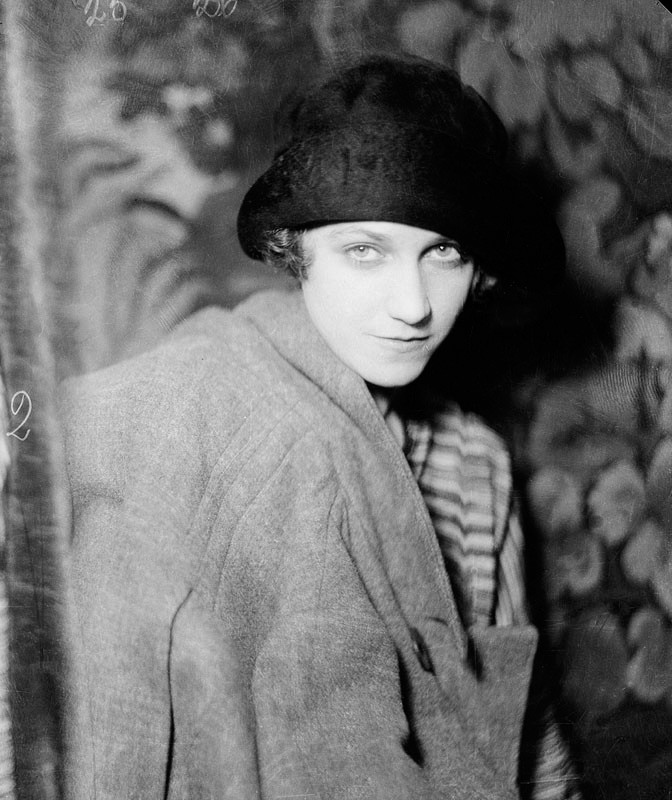
- Born: 24 March 1904; Stockholm, Sweden
- Died: 17 February 1952 (aged 47)
- Occupation: Actress
- Years active: 1925-1949

Anna Lindahl (24 March 1904 – 17 February 1952) was a Swedish film actress. She appeared in 19 films between 1925 and 1949.

== Selected filmography ==
- Ingmar's Inheritance (1925)
- The Triumph of the Heart (1929)
- The Love Express (1932)
- Man's Way with Women (1934)
- Under False Flag (1935)
- Comrades in Uniform (1938)
- Emilie Högquist (1939)
- If I Could Marry the Minister (1941)
- The Yellow Clinic (1942)
- Young Blood (1943)
- I Killed (1943)
- Motherhood (1945)
- Sunshine Follows Rain (1946)
- A Ship to India (1947)
- Big Lasse of Delsbo (1949)
