= The Talk of the Town (1941 film) =

1941 Swedish drama film

- Directed by: Per Lindberg
- Written by: Esther Grenen (novel); Per Lindberg; Per Erik Lindorm
- Produced by: Sven Kihlberg
- Starring: Olof Sandborg; Carl Ström; Marianne Löfgren
- Cinematography: Harry Hasso
- Edited by: Arne Mattsson
- Music by: Hilding Rosenberg
- Production company: Sveafilm
- Distributed by: Sveafilm
- Release date: 29 September 1941
- Running time: 86 minutes
- Country: Sweden
- Language: Swedish

The Talk of the Town (Swedish: Det sags pa stan) is a 1941 Swedish drama film directed by Per Lindberg and starring Olof Sandborg, Carl Ström and Marianne Löfgren. The film's sets were designed by the art director Bertil Duroj. Location shooting took place around Nyköping.

== Synopsis ==
In a small Swedish town anonymous letters are sent to five families. Signed Veritas" (Truth), the letters dredge up events from the past that the families had hoped had been forgotten and would much rather keep buried.

== Cast ==
- Olof Sandborg as Forsenius, lawyer
- Carl Ström as Dr. Grip
- Hilding Gavle as Police inspector Nilsson
- Marianne Löfgren as Jeanette
- Arnold Sjöstrand as Martin Bilt, teacher
- Gudrun Brost as Greta Bilt
- Torsten Bergström as Landowner Fristedt
- Elsa Marianne von Rosen as Bessie Fristedt
- Oscar Ljung as Törring, pharmacist
- Mona Mårtenson as Mrs. Törring
- Bengt Ekerot as Sven Törring
- Börje Nilsson as Nils Törring
- Elsa Widborg as Mrs. Jansson
- Willy Peters as Friis, watchmaker
- Emil Fjellström as Karlsson
- Inga-Lilly Forsström as Petra
- Linnéa Hillberg as Selma Grip
- Peter Höglund as The gardener
- John Norrman as The photographer
- Folke Helleberg as Count Axel
- Helga Hallén as Alice
- Charley Paterson as Larsson, Fristedt's servant
- Robert Ryberg as Man at cafe
- Gösta Bodin as Man at cafe
- Helga Brofeldt as Shop assistant
- Thyra Larsson as Dam på basaren
- Siri Olson as Biträde
- Lisbeth Bodin as Flicka i sångkören
- Mary Hjelte as Expedit
- John Elfström as Poliskonstapel
- Agda Helin as Baderska
- Nancy Dalunde as Girl at the bazaar
- Helge Hagerman as Guest at cafe
- Astrid Bodin as Kiosktant
- Erik Rosén as Överste Fristedt
- Yngve Nyqvist as Domaren
- Bojan Westin as Ung flicka
- Anna-Stina Wåglund as Telefonist
- Mona Geijer-Falkner as Old Woman
- Eva Dahlbeck as Dancing woman

== Bibliography ==
- Qvist, Per Olov & von Bagh, Peter. Guide to the Cinema of Sweden and Finland. Greenwood Publishing Group, 2000.
