= Rune Carlsten =

Swedish actor

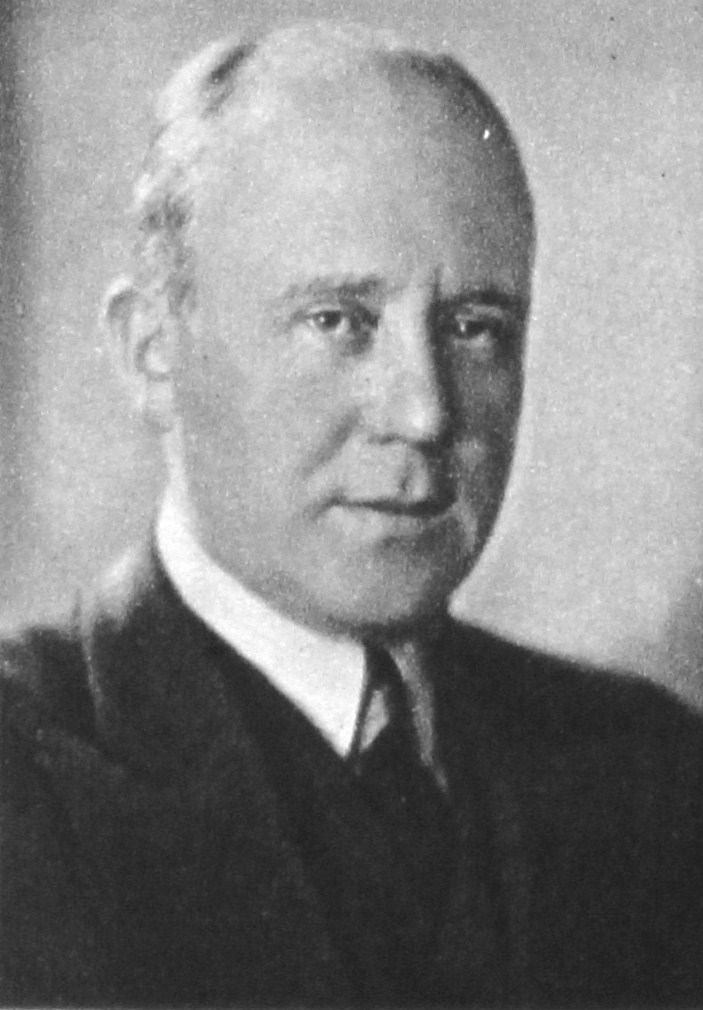
- Carlsten in 1942
- Born: 2 July 1890; Stockholm, Sweden
- Died: 12 October 1970 (aged 80); Täby, Sweden
- Occupations: Actor, Writer, Director
- Years active: 1919–1958 (film)

Rune Carlsten (2 July 1890 – 12 October 1970) was a Swedish actor, screenwriter and film director.

== Biography ==
Carlsten studied at Stockholm University from 1908 to 1910. His early theatre career included engagements with Einar Fröberg's theatre company (1910–1912), the Swedish Theatre in Stockholm (1912–1913), the Swedish Theatre in Helsinki (1913–1914), and the Intimate Theatre (1914–1921). He also worked at Djurgårdsteatern from 1917 to 1921 and again from 1924 to 1925. His subsequent engagements included Lorensbergsteatern in Gothenburg (1921–1924), AB Alb. Ranft's Theatre (1925–1926), the Oscar Theatre (1926–1932), and the Comedy Theatre (1932–1933).

In film, Carlsten worked with Filmindustri AB Skandia (1918–1921), Bonnierfilm (1924), Paramount in Paris (1929–1932), Jarfilm in Oslo (1932), Finlandia Film in Helsinki (1933), Ufa in Berlin (1933), and Rosenbergsatelier in Vienna (1938).

As early as 1919, he gave an acclaimed performance as Carlsson in the first film adaptation of The People of Hemsö.

In 1933 he was engaged at Dramaten, where he worked as both an actor and director. Here he staged, among other things, Hjalmar Söderberg's play Aftonstjärnan.

He was involved in the first Swedish experiments with speech film around 1930. Rune Carlsten was affiliated with Radiotjänst from 1930 and was a board member of Drottningholmsteatern's Friends.

In 1942, Carlsten made an acclaimed film adaptation of the recently deceased Hjalmar Söderberg's novel Doctor Glas, in which he appeared as a screenwriter, director, and actor.

Rune Carlsten was the son of the wholesaler Eric Carlsten and Hilma Maria Herdin. During the years 1916–1923, he was married to the actress Anna Peréus. From 1925 he was married to the actress Dora Söderberg, the daughter of Hjalmar Söderberg. Their son, Rolf Carlsten, became an actor and director.

Carlsten is buried at the Northern Cemetery in Stockholm.

== Selected filmography ==
- Ett farligt frieri (1919)
- Dangerous Paradise (1931)
- Half Way to Heaven (1931)
- Tired Theodore (1931)
- Longing for the Sea (1931)
- Wife for a Day (1933)
- The Marriage Game (1935)
- Conflict (1937)
- Mot nya tider (1939)
- Frestelse (1940)
- Fransson the Terrible (1941)
- Home from Babylon (1941)
- Lasse-Maja (1941)
- Doctor Glas (1942)
- General von Döbeln (1942)
- The Sin of Anna Lans (1943)
- Mister Collins' Adventure (1943)
- The Invisible Wall (1944)
- Count Only the Happy Moments (1944)
- Maria of Kvarngarden (1945)
- Black Roses (1945)
- The Serious Game (1945)
- Classmates (1952)
- Salka Valka (1954)

== Bibliography ==
- Waldman, Harry. Missing Reels: Lost Films of American and European Cinema. McFarland, 2000.
