= A Swedish Tiger (film) =

1948 film

- Directed by: Gustaf Edgren
- Written by: Gustaf Edgren; Oscar Rydqvist
- Produced by: Inge Ivarson
- Starring: Edvin Adolphson; Erik Berglund; Margareta Fahlén
- Cinematography: Martin Bodin
- Edited by: Oscar Rosander
- Music by: Sixten Ehrling
- Production company: Kungsfilm
- Distributed by: Kungsfilm
- Release date: 18 May 1948
- Running time: 90 minutes
- Country: Sweden
- Language: Swedish

A Swedish Tiger (Swedish: En svensk tiger) is a 1948 Swedish war drama film directed by Gustaf Edgren and starring Edvin Adolphson, Erik Berglund and Margareta Fahlén. The film's sets were designed by the art director Nils Svenwall. Its title refers to the wartime propaganda campaign A Swedish Tiger encouraging inhabitants to avoid careless talk.

== Synopsis ==
British intelligence discover that a Swedish actor in Stockholm is a doppelganger of a British general and decide to recruit him as a decoy. They lure him to London by offering him a part in Othello.

== Cast ==
- Edvin Adolphson as John Tiger
- Erik Berglund as Fredrik Andersson
- Margareta Fahlén as Lena
- Sven Lindberg as Kurt Mueller aka Poniatovski
- Marianne Löfgren as Hanna Andersson-Tiger
- Gunnar Björnstrand as Hans Wolff
- Arnold Sjöstrand as Dickman
- Fritiof Billquist as Leonard Strömlund
- Olof Winnerstrand as Swedish Minister
- Gösta Cederlund as General
- Sture Djerf as Aide
- Carl Hagman as Photographer
- Ivar Hallbäck as Translator
- Douglas Håge as Frasse Fredriksson
- Gull Natorp as Klara
- Barbro Nordin as Mitzi
- Artur Rolén as Manuscript Writer
- Henrik Schildt as Chief Investigator
- Tord Stål as Engdahl
- Wiktor Andersson as A man

== Bibliography ==
- Fawkes, Richard. Opera on Film. Duckworth, 2000.
