= Naima Wifstrand =

Swedish actress (1890–1968)

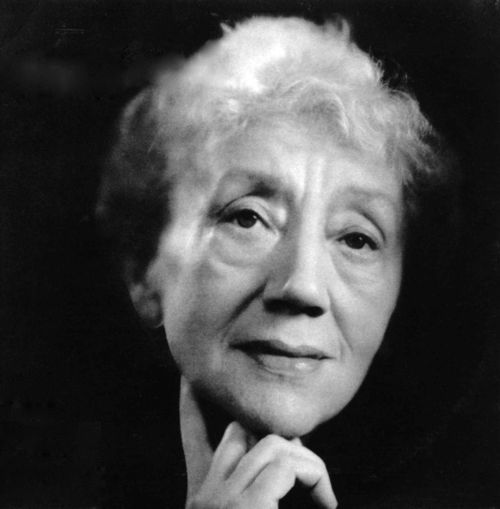
- Naima Wifstrand, 1950s
- Born: Siri Naima Matilda Wifstrand; 4 September 1890; Stockholm, Sweden
- Died: 23 October 1968 (aged 78); Stockholm, Sweden
- Occupations: Actress, singer, composer
- Years active: 1905–1968
- Spouse: Captain Erling Nielsen (1921–1928)

Naima Wifstrand (pronounced [ˈnâjma ˈvîːfstrand]; 4 September 1890 – 23 October 1968) was a Swedish film actress, operetta singer, troubadour, director and composer. In her later years, she was cast in several supporting roles in Ingmar Bergman films.

== Biography ==
Born Siri Naima Matilda Wifstrand in Stockholm in 1890, she was raised by her mother in Fleminggatan. Wifstrand never trained acting but learned the art thoroughly when she in 1905 joined the Anna Lundberg Theatre Company, a well reputed and respected theatre company in Sweden at the time. She travelled with them for a number of years, appearing in small parts. This eventually led her to small parts at theatres in Helsinki and around Stockholm. But at this time Wifstrand did not have her mind set on acting, instead she sought to be a singer. And it was as a grand operetta singer she became famous and enjoyed a successful star career for 30 years in Sweden.

=== Career and break-through ===
Wifstrand studied music and singing in Stockholm at the Swedish Royal Academy of Music and in 1910 she went to London and further trained for Raymond von zur Mühlen. After her studies she was one of the most acknowledged operetta singers in Scandinavia. She worked at Oscarsteatern from 1913 to 1918, and toured Sweden and Scandinavia for years. Greta Garbo admired Wifstrand in this time, and patterned some of her performances after Wifstrand's.

Wifstrand's big breakthrough came as Countess Stasi in Emmerich Kálmán's operetta Die Csárdásfürstin in 1916. She worked in the 1920s mainly at the opera houses in Oslo and Copenhagen. For many years she lived in London where she performed with troubadour-songs alone along with her guitar, or with a piano accompanist. When the first attempts at broadcast television took place in Britain, Wifstrand became one of the first "TV stars", as she appeared on TV in the 1930s and performed a number of songs.

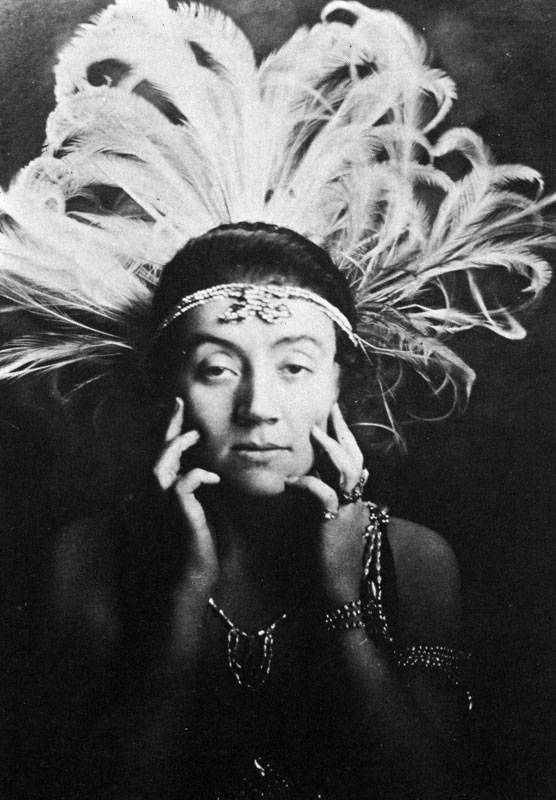
Wifstrand as Countess Stasi in Kálmán's Die Csárdásfürstin, 1916

In 1937 Swedish stage director Per Lindberg cast her as Mother Peachum in Bertolt Brecht's The Threepenny Opera (in Swe: Tolvskillingsoperan) which became a hugely successful production and toured with the National Swedish Touring Theatre. When Bertolt Brecht later left Germany because of the Nazis he first moved to Sweden where he lived for a time and wrote the part Mother Courage especially for Wifstrand – but sadly, she herself never got to play the part in what became one of Brecht's most successful plays. During his stay in Sweden, Wifstrand had helped Brecht both financially and also personally with accommodation.

=== Filming and Bergman ===
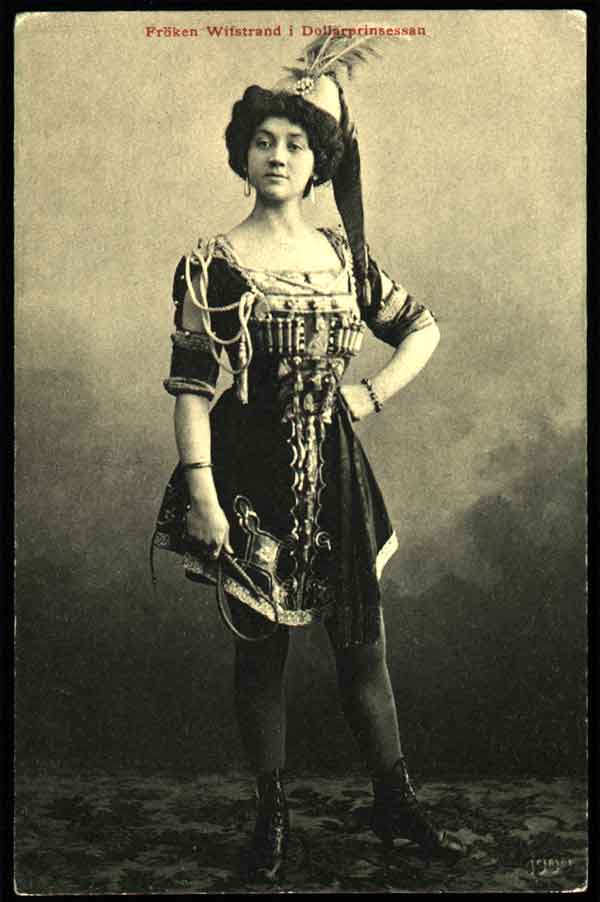
As Daisy in The Dollar Princess, 1909

In the 1940s, Wifsfrand planned to retiew from performing and focus on directing, serving at the Royal Swedish Opera from 1944 to 1946. However, her performances in several Swedish films during the decade received positive critical attention and led to renewed acting opportunities in both theatre and film. Among the directors who cast her was Ingmar Bergman, with whom she developed a long professional association. She was a member of Bergman's ensemble at Malmö City Theatre from 1954 to 1961 and appeared in several of his films, including Smiles of a Summer Night, Wild Strawberries, and The Magician. She also worked at Stockholm City Theatre from 1962 to 1963 and at Gothenburg City Theatre from 1964 onward.

Naima Wifstrand was married to captain Erling Nielsen from 1921 to 1928.

== Selected filmography ==
- Madame besøker Oslo (1927) - Madam Vera
- Pjerrot (1931)
- Pierrot græder (1931)
- Kungsgatan (1943) - Caretaker's Wife
- En dotter född (1944) - Edit
- Se opp för spioner! (1944) - Madame Carin
- Sten Stensson kommer till stan (1945) - Emma Bohrn
- Flickor i hamn (1945) - Mrs. Holst
- Stiliga Augusta (1946) - Fru Lundahl
- Evening at the Djurgarden (1946) - Mrs. Bender
- Jag älskar dig, argbigga (1946) - Anna
- Hotell Kåkbrinken (1946) - Mia
- How to Love (1947) - Vera Stätt
- Life in the Finnish Woods (1947) - Mrs. Sigrid Malm
- Two Women (1947) - Mrs. Jonsson
- Två kvinnor (1947) - Mrs. Jonsson
- The Night Watchman's Wife (1947) - Mrs. Eklund
- Det kom en gäst... (1947) - Grevinna Doris af Ernstam
- The People of Simlang Valley (1947) - Skoga-Börta
- The Poetry of Ådalen (1947) - Kersti
- Den långa vägen (1947) - Hedvig Charlotta Nordenflycht
- Music in Darkness (1948) - Mrs. Schröder
- Lappblod (1948) - Mina
- Hammarforsens brus (1948) - Marit's Grandma
- Sunshine (1948) - Helena
- Private Bom (1948) - Översköterskan
- Kvinnan gör mig galen (1948) - Hulda
- Flottans kavaljerer (1948) - Mateos mor
- The Devil and the Smalander (1949) - Titta Grå
- Playing Truant (1949) - Dehlin
- Thirst (1949) - Naima Wifstrand
- Singoalla (1949) - Cioara
- Fästmö uthyres (1950) - Old Lady
- Södrans revy (1950)
- My Name Is Puck (1951) - Agneta Lindman
- Valley of Eagles (1951) - Baroness Erland
- Say It with Flowers (1952) - Mrs. Lagerberg
- The Clang of the Pick (1952) - Narrator / Clothes Saleswoman
- Secrets of Women (1952) - Mrs. Lobelius (uncredited)
- For the Sake of My Intemperate Youth (1952) - Vendela Påhlman
- Ursula, the Girl from the Finnish Forests (1953) - Mossi
- The Road to Klockrike (1953) - Waterhead's Mother
- The Beat of Wings in the Night (1953) - Ane
- Malin går hem (1953)
- The Magnificent Lie (1955) - Gertrud (50 years later)
- The Dance Hall (1955) - 'Madame'
- Dreams (1955) - Mrs. Arén (uncredited)
- Paradise (1955) - Mrs. Ekström
- Smiles of a Summer Night (1955) - Mrs. Armfeldt
- La Sorcière (1956) - Maila
- The Girl in Tails (1956) - Widow Hyltenius
- My Passionate Longing (1956) - Lisa
- Mr. Sleeman Is Coming (1957, TV Movie) - Tant Bina
- Seventeen Years Old (1957) - Clara
- Wild Strawberries (1957) - Mrs. Borg - Isak's Mother
- The Magician (1958) - Granny Vogler
- The Judge (1960) - Mrs. Wangendorff
- Briggen Tre Liljor (1961) - Farmor Tuvesson
- Nils Holgerssons underbara resa (1962) - Mother Akka (voice)
- Myten (1966) - Mrs. von Grün
- Night Games (1966) - Astrid
- Hour of the Wolf (1968) - Old Lady with Hat
- Vindingevals (1968) - The Old Lady
