= Hem från Babylon =

1941 film

- Directed by: Alf Sjöberg
- Written by: Sigfrid Siwertz; Alf Sjöberg
- Based on: Home from Babylon by Sigfrid Siwertz
- Starring: Gerd Hagman; Arnold Sjöstrand; Georg Rydeberg
- Cinematography: Karl-Erik Alberts
- Edited by: Tage Holmberg
- Music by: Miff Görling; Arthur Österwall; Seymour Österwall
- Production company: Wivefilm
- Distributed by: Wivefilm
- Release date: 23 December 1941
- Running time: 106 minutes
- Country: Sweden
- Language: Swedish

Hem från Babylon is a 1941 Swedish drama film directed by Alf Sjöberg and starring Gerd Hagman, Arnold Sjöstrand and Georg Rydeberg. It was based on a 1923 novel of the same title by Sigfrid Siwertz. It was shot at the Centrumateljéerna Studios in Stockholm and on location around the city. The film's sets were designed by the art director Bertil Duroj.

== Synopsis ==
An engineer and a businessman are trying to escape the civil war in Manchuria. They suffer much, including contracting typhoid and the businessman dies. The engineer changes identity with the businessman. Although based on Siwertz's novel, the plot of the novel has been extended in time to the pre-war years of World War II.

== Cast ==
- Gerd Hagman as Britta von Wendt
- Arnold Sjöstrand as Linus Treffenberg
- Georg Rydeberg as Cesar Lee
- Anders Henrikson as Sergej Nabocof
- Irma Christenson as Marcelle
- Olof Widgren as John Bidencap
- Rune Carlsten as Wigelius
- Georg Funkquist as Hugo
- Barbro Kollberg as Gunborg
- Frank Sundström as Marabou

== Bibliography ==
- Goble, Alan. The Complete Index to Literary Sources in Film. Walter de Gruyter, 1999.
- Gustafsson, Fredrik. The Man from the Third Row: Hasse Ekman, Swedish Cinema and the Long Shadow of Ingmar Bergman. Berghahn Books, 2016.
- Qvist, Per Olov & von Bagh, Peter. Guide to the Cinema of Sweden and Finland. Greenwood Publishing Group, 2000.
