= Georg Rydeberg =

Swedish actor (1907-1983)

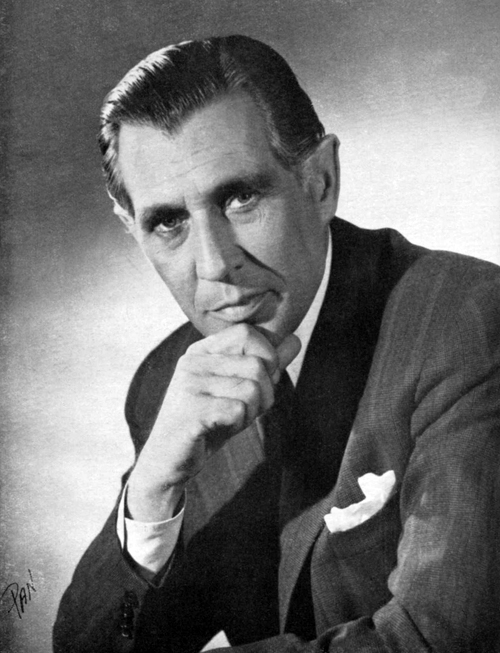
- Born: 21 July 1907; Gothenburg, Sweden
- Died: 22 February 1983 (aged 75); Stockholm, Sweden
- Occupation: Actor
- Years active: 1932–1981

Olof Georg Rydeberg (21 July 1907 – 22 February 1983) was a Swedish film actor. He appeared in more than 70 films between 1932 and 1981. He was married to the Finnish actress Birgit Sergelius.

== Partial filmography ==
- International Match (1932)
- Dear Relatives (1933)
- Love and Dynamite (1933)
- False Greta (1934)
- Fired (1934)
- Walpurgis Night (1935)
- Adolf Strongarm (1937)
- Russian Flu (1937)
- Dollar (1938)
- A Woman's Face (1938)
- Emilie Högquist (1939)
- Lärarinna på vift (1941)
- In Paradise (1941)
- If I Could Marry the Minister (1941)
- Home from Babylon (1941)
- Doctor Glas (1942)
- Dangerous Ways (1942)
- The Case of Ingegerd Bremssen (1942)
- Ombyte av tåg (1943)
- Som du vill ha mej (1943)
- Gentleman with a Briefcase (1943)
- Appassionata (1944)
- Harald the Stalwart (1946)
- Two Women (1947)
- Life Starts Now (1948)
- The Firebird (1952)
- For the Sake of My Intemperate Youth (1952)
- The Green Lift (1952)
- Bread of Love (1953)
- Hidden in the Fog (1953)
- The Shadow (1953)
- Storm Over Tjurö (1954)
- Laugh Bomb (1954)
- The People of Hemsö (1955)
- Whoops! (1955)
- The Girl in Tails (1956)
- The Biscuit (1956)
- The Minister of Uddarbo (1957)
- Night Light (1957)
- Seventeen Years Old (1957)
- A Dreamer's Journey (1957)
- The Judge (1960)
- People Meet and Sweet Music Fills the Heart (1967)
- Hour of the Wolf (1968)
- Vindingevals (1968)
- Göta kanal eller Vem drog ur proppen? (1981)
