= Henrik Schildt =

Finnish-born Swedish film actor

- Born: 10 July 1914; Helsinki, Finland
- Died: 15 March 2001 (aged 86); Stockholm, Sweden
- Other name: Ernst Henrik Schildt
- Occupation: Actor
- Years active: 1936-1997

Henrik Schildt (10 July 1914 – 15 March 2001) was a Finnish-born Swedish film actor. He is the father of Johan Schildt, Peter Schildt and Veronica Schildt Bendjelloul.

== Selected filmography ==
- Johan Ulfstjerna (1936)
- Circus (1939)
- The Yellow Clinic (1942)
- Captured by a Voice (1943)
- Katrina (1943)
- The Brothers' Woman (1943)
- Count Only the Happy Moments (1944)
- The Rose of Tistelön (1945)
- Maria of Kvarngarden (1945)
- Blood and Fire (1945)
- Evening at the Djurgarden (1946)
- A Swedish Tiger (1948)
- Each Heart Has Its Own Story (1948)
- Andersson's Kalle (1950)
- Customs Officer Bom (1951)
- Dance, My Doll (1953)
- Hidden in the Fog (1953)
- My Passionate Longing (1956)
- The Hard Game (1956)
- Encounters in the Twilight (1957)

== Bibliography ==
- Goble, Alan. The Complete Index to Literary Sources in Film. Walter de Gruyter, 1999.
