= The Yellow Clinic =

1942 Swedish drama film

- Directed by: Ivar Johansson
- Written by: Maja Björkman (novel); Ivar Johansson
- Produced by: Sven Nygren
- Starring: Arnold Sjöstrand; Viveca Lindfors; Nils Lundell
- Cinematography: Ernst Westerberg; Harry Hasso
- Edited by: Eric Nordemar
- Music by: Harry Ahlin
- Production company: Film AB Lux
- Distributed by: Film AB Lux
- Release date: 27 July 1942
- Running time: 114 minutes
- Country: Sweden
- Language: Swedish

The Yellow Clinic (Swedish: Gula kliniken) is a 1942 Swedish drama film directed by Ivar Johansson and starring Arnold Sjöstrand, Viveca Lindfors and Nils Lundell. It was made at the Centrumateljéerna Studios in Stockholm with location shooting also taking place at the Södersjukhuset and the Karolinska Hospitals in the city. The film's sets were designed by the art director Bertil Duroj.

== Synopsis ==
The head of a woman's clinic is firmly against abortion, but one of his doctors has opposing views.

== Cast ==
- Arnold Sjöstrand as Dr. Jörn
- Viveca Lindfors as Nurse Doris
- Nils Lundell as Olsson
- Gudrun Brost as Nurse Olga
- Åke Grönberg as Herman Karlsson
- Barbro Kollberg as Irma Svensson, maid
- Barbro Ribbing as Margit Wall
- Henrik Schildt as Einar Franke
- Sten Lindgren as Dr. Nizzen
- Gösta Cederlund as Prof. Wall
- Karin Kavli as Miss Lind, actress
- Anna Lindahl as Mrs. Olsson
- Mona Mårtenson as Mrs. Andersson
- Folke Hamrin as Dr. Åkerholm
- Gull Natorp as Nurse Dagmar
- Arthur Fischer as Sailor
- Bellan Roos as Mrs. Karlsson
- Millan Bolander as Nurse Dagmar
- Ingrid Envall as Mrs. Berglund
- Erik Hell as First Mate
- Bertil Hilbert as Dr. Jönsson
- Gerda Landgren as Mrs. Lundkvist
- Greta Liming as Mrs. Krantz
- Helge Mauritz as Sterner, engineer
- Ruth Stevens as Mrs. Lorell

== Bibliography ==
- Qvist, Per Olov & von Bagh, Peter. Guide to the Cinema of Sweden and Finland. Greenwood Publishing Group, 2000.
