= In Paradise =

1941 Swedish comedy film

- Directed by: Per Lindberg
- Written by: Helge Krog; Per Lindberg
- Produced by: Sven Nygren
- Starring: Margit Manstad; Viveca Lindfors; Georg Rydeberg
- Cinematography: Sten Dahlgren; Harry Hasso
- Edited by: Per Lindberg
- Music by: Hilding Rosenberg
- Production company: Film AB Lux
- Distributed by: Film AB Lux
- Release date: 13 October 1941
- Running time: 86 minutes
- Country: Sweden
- Language: Swedish

In Paradise (Swedish: I paradis...) is a 1941 Swedish comedy film directed by Per Lindberg and starring Margit Manstad, Viveca Lindfors and Georg Rydeberg. It was shot at the Centrumateljéerna Studios in Stockholm. The film's sets were designed by the art director Bertil Duroj.

== Synopsis ==
A handsome publisher has developed a reputation as a Don Juan and he is hounded by women under this misapprehension. To escape from them he travels out to an isolated island.

== Cast ==
- Einar Beyron as Adam Tomson
- Margit Manstad as Birgitta Vendel
- Viveca Lindfors as Angelica Jansson
- Birgitta Valberg as Marianne
- Georg Rydeberg as Leo Flykt
- Anna-Lisa Baude as Aunt Augusta
- Fritiof Billquist as Oscar
- Gudrun Brost as Klara
- Hilding Gavle as 'Blixten'
- Nils Lundell as Lasse
- Nils Ohlin as Bernhard
- Harry Roeck Hansen as Jansson

== Bibliography ==
- Qvist, Per Olov & von Bagh, Peter. Guide to the Cinema of Sweden and Finland. Greenwood Publishing Group, 2000.
