= Incorrigible (1946 film) =

1946 film

- Directed by: Arne Mattsson
- Written by: Sven Zetterström
- Starring: Stig Olin; Stig Järrel; Marianne Löfgren
- Cinematography: Sten Dahlgren
- Edited by: Eric Nordemar
- Music by: Jules Sylvain
- Production company: Kungsfilm
- Distributed by: Kungsfilm
- Release date: 30 September 1946
- Running time: 96 minutes
- Country: Sweden
- Language: Swedish

Incorrigible (Swedish: Rötägg) is a 1946 Swedish drama film directed by Arne Mattsson and starring Stig Olin, Stig Järrel and Marianne Löfgren. It was made at the Centrumateljéerna Studios in Stockholm and on location in the city. The film's sets were designed by the art director Bertil Duroj.

== Cast ==
- Stig Olin as Krister Sundbom
- Stig Järrel as Björn Mander
- Marianne Löfgren as Olga Sundbom
- Arnold Sjöstrand as Bring
- Elsie Albiin as Rosa Langenfeldt
- Erik 'Bullen' Berglund as Hacksén
- Ingrid Backlin as Vera
- Ingemar Pallin as Bengt Ekner
- Harriett Philipson as Birgitta Mander
- Gunnar Björnstrand as Dr. Bertil Langenfeldt
- Börje Mellvig as Furustam
- Bengt Logardt as Åke Holm
- Tord Stål as Harry Helander
- Carl Hagman as School Janitor
- Signe Wirff as Hanna
- Julia Cæsar as Hostess
- Kurt Willbing as Svenne
- Ragnar Planthaber as Putte Enkvist
- Bo Wärff as Viktor 'Vicke' Hall
- Bengt Carenborg as Kalle Svensson
- Olof Ek as Person
- Ivar Kåge as John Sundbom
- Per-Axel Arosenius as Teacher
- Bertil Berglund as Andersson
- Astrid Bodin as Cook
- Nils Dahlgren as Police Inspector Gustafsson
- Edvard Danielsson as Cue Player
- Nils Ekman as Teacher
- Mary Gräber as Rosalie
- Eric Gustafson as Maître d'
- Stina Hedberg as Lady
- Agda Helin as Lady
- Magnus Kesster as Police Officer
- Mimi Nelson as Waitress
- Ivar Wahlgren as Police Officer
- Birger Åsander as Cue Player

== Bibliography ==
- Björklund, Elisabet & Larsson, Mariah. Swedish Cinema and the Sexual Revolution: Critical Essays. McFarland, 2016.
