= Nils Ohlin =

Swedish actor

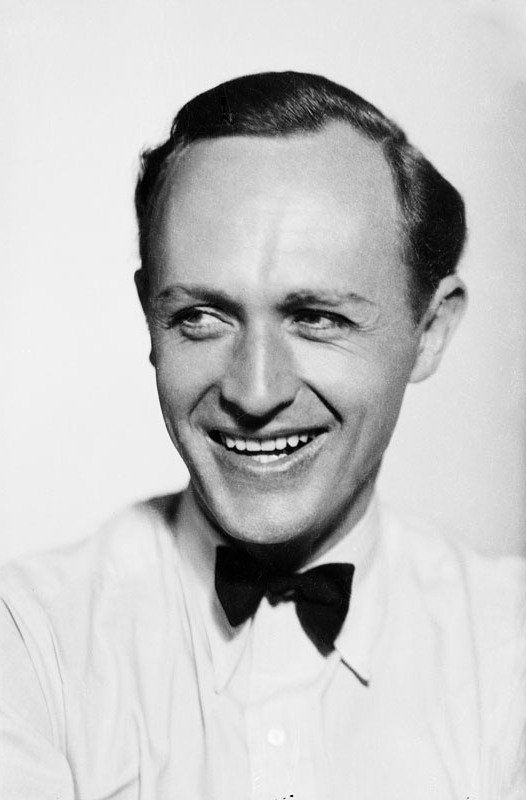
- Born: 17 July 1895; Stockholm, Sweden
- Died: 30 July 1958 (aged 63); Stockholm, Sweden
- Occupation: Actor
- Years active: 1921-1954 (film)

Nils Ohlin (1895–1958) was a Swedish stage and film actor. Primarily acting in the theatre, he also appeared in a variety of films from the silent era to the 1950s as a character actor.

== Selected filmography ==
- De landsflyktige (1921)
- Johan Ulfstjerna (1923)
- Ingmar's Inheritance (1925)
- She Is the Only One (1926)
- The Tales of Ensign Stål (1926)
- The Rivals (1926)
- Say It with Music (1929)
- The Love Express (1932)
- Wife for a Day (1933)
- Adventure in Pyjamas (1935)
- Mother Gets Married (1937)
- Life Begins Today (1939)
- Lasse-Maja (1941)
- In Paradise (1941)
- A Girl for Me (1943)
- Two Women (1947)
- Love Wins Out (1949)
- Playing Truant (1949)
- Divorced (1951)
- Blondie, Beef and the Banana (1952)
- Simon the Sinner (1954)

== Bibliography ==
- Gustafsson, Tommy. Masculinity in the Golden Age of Swedish Cinema: A Cultural Analysis of 1920s Films. McFarland, 2014.
