= Karl-Erik Alberts =

Swedish cinematographer (1910–1989)

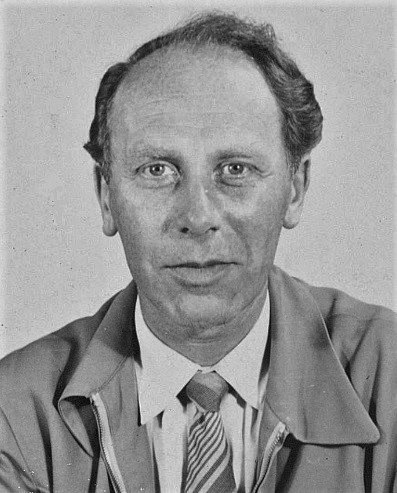
- Born: 27 December 1910; Gothenburg, Sweden
- Died: 2 December 1989 (aged 78); Stockholm, Sweden
- Occupation: Cinematographer
- Years active: 1935–1970 (film)

Karl-Erik Alberts (1910–1989) was a Swedish cinematographer. He was employed on more than fifty film productions during his career. He worked for a variety of companies including Svensk Filmindustri, Europa Film and Svensk Talfilm.

== Selected filmography ==
- The Marriage Game (1935)
- Mot nya tider (1939)
- Home from Babylon (1941)
- Doctor Glas (1942)
- Tomorrow's Melody (1942)
- Young Blood (1943)
- The Brothers' Woman (1943)
- Som du vill ha mej (1943)
- She Thought It Was Him (1943)
- Eaglets (1944)
- The Forest Is Our Heritage (1944)
- Count Only the Happy Moments (1944)
- Appassionata (1944)
- The Serious Game (1945)
- Maria of Kvarngarden (1945)
- Black Roses (1945)
- Onsdagsväninnan (1946)
- Two Women (1947)
- The Bride Came Through the Ceiling (1947)
- Loffe the Tramp (1948)
- Sunshine (1948)
- Number 17 (1949)
- Sven Tusan (1949)
- Pimpernel Svensson (1950)
- Living on 'Hope' (1951)
- Getting Married (1955)
- The Summer Wind Blows (1955)
- A Doll's House (1956)
- Miss April (1958)
- Line Six (1958)
- Sängkammartjuven (1959)

== Bibliography ==
- Rasmussen, Bjørn. Filmens hvem-vad-hvor: Udenlanske film 1950-1967. Politiken, 1968.
