= Tomorrow's Melody =

1942 film

- Directed by: Ragnar Frisk
- Written by: Stig Ahlgren
- Produced by: Stellan Claësson
- Starring: Viveca Lindfors; Nils Lundell; Björn Berglund
- Cinematography: Karl-Erik Alberts
- Edited by: Lennart Wallén
- Music by: Jules Sylvain
- Production company: Film AB Lux
- Distributed by: Film AB Lux
- Release date: 16 March 1942
- Running time: 93 minutes
- Country: Sweden
- Language: Swedish

Tomorrow's Melody (Swedish: Morgondagens melodi) is a 1942 Swedish drama film directed by Ragnar Frisk and starring Viveca Lindfors, Nils Lundell and Björn Berglund. The film's sets were designed by the art director Bertil Duroj. It was shot at the Centrumateljéerna Studios in Stockholm and the city's PUB department store.

== Synopsis ==
Maj-Lis Wassberg, an upper-class university student, hears from a classmate about the poor working conditions at a major Stockholm department store. She gets a job there to investigate and encounters a bullying head of department as well as his son Thore Almen, with whom she soon falls in love. Thore is trying to form a trade union for which he is fired. Discovering that her father is a director at the bank that owns the store, she appeals to him to try and sort things out.

== Cast ==
- Viveca Lindfors as Maj-Lis Wassberg
- Nils Lundell as Mr. Almen
- Björn Berglund as Thore Almen
- Karin Swanström as Fru Almen
- Gun Robertson as Birgit Almen
- Ernst Eklund as Wassberg
- Ragnar Widestedt as Managing director
- Hjördis Petterson as Mrs. Wassberg
- Arthur Fischer as 'Surlimpan'
- Emil Fjellström as Sundvall
- Sven-Eric Gamble as Boy
- Åke Grönberg as Manager at record department
- Nils Jacobsson as Man
- Willy Peters as 'Skjort-Lasse'
- Barbro Ribbing as Emmy
- Betty Bjurström as Young Woman
- Saga Sjöberg as Singer
- Carl Ström as Man

== Bibliography ==
- Qvist, Per Olov & von Bagh, Peter. Guide to the Cinema of Sweden and Finland. Greenwood Publishing Group, 2000.
