= Willy Peters =

Swedish actor

- Born: 31 January 1915; Stockholm, Sweden
- Died: 13 August 1976 (aged 61); Stockholm, Sweden
- Other name: Wilhelm Ferdinand Casper Joachim Peters
- Occupations: Actor, director
- Years active: 1935–1972
- Spouse(s): Agneta Lagerfeldt (1943–1976)

Willy Peters (31 January 1915 – 13 August 1976) was a Swedish actor and director. He appeared in about 50 films. He was married to actress Agneta Lagerfeldt from 1943 until his death. The journalist Christian Peters is their son.

== Selected filmography ==
- Ungdom av i dag (1935) - Nyblom
- Med folket för fosterlandet (1938) - Per Albin Hansson in 1909 (uncredited)
- Gubben kommer (1939) - Erik Hempelmann
- Oh, What a Boy! (1939) - Carl-Bertil Blomberg
- Mot nya tider (1939) - Per Albin Hansson
- Kronans käcka gossar (1940) - 45 Viktor Bengtsson
- Stål (1940) - Young man (uncredited)
- A Real Man (1940) - Nils (uncredited)
- Med dej i mina armar (1940) - Guest at Party (uncredited)
- Romans (1940) - Man
- Hans nåds testamente (1940) - Roger
- Bright Prospects (1941) - Borg
- Uppåt igen (1941) - Bengt Svensson Jr.
- Only a Woman (1941) - Andersson, accused (uncredited)
- The Talk of the Town (1941) - Friis, watchmaker
- Lasse-Maja (1941) - Alphonse
- Dangerous Ways (1942) - Policeman (uncredited)
- Tomorrow's Melody (1942) - 'Skjort-Lasse'
- Adventurer (1942) - Rönnow Bille
- It Is My Music (1942) - Birger, sculptor
- Halta Lottas krog (1942) - Kristian Hultcrantz
- Kvinnan tar befälet (1942) - Axel Bergström
- Ombyte av tåg (1943) - Rehearsing Actor (uncredited)
- Elvira Madigan (1943) - Officer (uncredited)
- A Girl for Me (1943) - Klas' Friend
- I dag gifter sig min man (1943) - Dentist Ström
- Life in the Country (1943) - Fritz
- Som folk är mest (1944) - Filip Blom, gemenligen kallad Fillebom
- Fattiga riddare (1944) - Gambler
- Maria of Kvarngarden (1945) - District Attorney
- Vad vet ni om Sussie (1945) - Oscar Lindberg
- I som här inträden... (1945) - Patient (uncredited)
- En förtjusande fröken (1945) - Henry
- 13 stolar (1945) - Albert Bergman
- Försök inte med mej..! (1946) - Fritiof Floden
- Kristin Commands (1946) - Young Man (uncredited)
- No Way Back (1947) - Benito
- Each to His Own Way (1948) - Cetrén
- The Devil and the Smalander (1949) - Casimir
- Jungfrun på Jungfrusund (1949) - Boman
- Åsa-Nisse Goes Hunting (1950) - Klöverhage
- Livat på luckan (1951) - 45 Viktor Bengtsson
- In Lilac Time (1952) - John Weijner
- Åsa-Nisse på nya äventyr (1952) - Klöverhage
- Åsa-Nisse on Holiday (1953) - Klöverhage
- Flottans glada gossar (1954) - Svensson, Lawyer (scenes deleted)
- Åsa-Nisse på hal is (1954) - Klöverhage, the district attorney
- Seger i mörker (1954) - Mr. Seaburg (uncredited)
- Brudar och bollar (1954) - Narrator
- Simon the Sinner (1954) - Journalist
- Flicka i kasern (1955) - Kjell
- Den vita stenen (1964)
- En sån strålande dag (1967) - Manager
- Shame (1968) - En äldre officer
- Skräcken har 1000 ögon (1970) - Gustaf, Police Officer
- Nana (1970) - The Prince
- Mannen från andra sidan (1972) - Board member
