= If I Could Marry the Minister =

1941 Swedish film

- Directed by: Ivar Johansson
- Written by: Ester Lindin (novel); Ivar Johansson
- Based on: Tänk, om jag gifter mig med prästen by Ester Lindin
- Produced by: Stellan Claësson; Per Lindberg
- Starring: Viveca Lindfors; Georg Rydeberg; Arnold Sjöstrand
- Cinematography: Harry Hasso
- Edited by: Ivar Johansson; Kurt Wahlgren
- Music by: Eric Westberg
- Production company: Film AB Lux
- Distributed by: Film AB Lux
- Release date: 12 December 1941
- Running time: 115 minutes
- Country: Sweden
- Language: Swedish

If I Could Marry the Minister (Swedish: Tänk, om jag gifter mig med prästen) is a 1941 Swedish romantic drama film directed by Ivar Johansson and starring Viveca Lindfors, Georg Rydeberg, Arnold Sjöstrand. with screenplay by Ester Lindin and Ivar Johansson. The film's sets were designed by the art director Bertil Duroj.

== Plot ==
Eva Örn, a young teacher, moves to rural Vikarlunda, where her good looks and strong opinions estrange her from the locals. She begins a clandestine affair with the priest, Ingvar Hagson.

== Cast ==
- Viveca Lindfors as Eva Örn
- Georg Rydeberg as Ingvar Hagson
- Arnold Sjöstrand as Knut Knutsson of Sjövalla
- Nils Lundell as Albert Sundström
- Anna Lindahl as Greta Knutsson
- Gudrun Brost as Helga Persson of Mon
- Sven Bergvall as Persson of Mon
- Linnéa Hillberg as Sophie Ekeberger
- Viran Rydkvist as Ester Örn
- Arthur Natorp as Pettersson, Organist
- Axel Högel as Mr. Örn
- Ruth Stevens as Doris Örn
- Torsten Bergström as Brother Johannes
- Gabriel Alw as Sjövalla's Helping Hand

== Controversy and reception ==
The novel by Ester Lindin which forms the basis of the film was already very controversial, and when it was announced that it would be adapted for the screen, a delegation of priests petitioned the film company Luxfilm and demanded that filming be stopped. The chief executive officer issued an unofficial warning. Despite this, the film was made and became one of the greatest successes of the 1940s.

One reviewer at the time wrote: "Since her novel was released [Ester Lindin] has had the questionable pleasure of getting pilloried in cheap cabarets and causeries as the amorality priestess number one. The film gives all these moral busybodies an answer that should sting – never before has moral hypocrisy and the false idyll of the philistine been exposed to such a mighty attack."

== Bibliography ==
- Nelmes, Jill & Selbo, Jule. Women Screenwriters: An International Guide. Palgrave Macmillan, 2015.
- Qvist, Per Olov & von Bagh, Peter. Guide to the Cinema of Sweden and Finland. Greenwood Publishing Group, 2000.
