= The Brothers' Woman =

1943 film

- Directed by: Gösta Cederlund
- Written by: Ebba Richert
- Based on: The Brothers' Woman by Ebba Richert
- Produced by: Sven Nygren
- Starring: Viveca Lindfors; Arnold Sjöstrand; Gunnar Sjöberg
- Cinematography: Karl-Erik Alberts
- Music by: Jules Sylvain
- Production company: Film AB Lux
- Distributed by: Film AB Lux
- Release date: 22 November 1943
- Running time: 104 minutes
- Country: Sweden
- Language: Swedish

The Brothers' Woman (Swedish: Brödernas kvinna) is a 1943 Swedish drama film directed by Gösta Cederlund and starring Viveca Lindfors, Arnold Sjöstrand and Gunnar Sjöberg. It was shot at the Centrumateljéerna Studios in Stockholm. The film's sets were designed by the art director Bertil Duroj. It is based on the 1939 novel of the same title by Ebba Richert.

== Synopsis ==
On the island of Gotland a farmer marries Emma an attractive young woman from Visby. However she becomes involved with his brother and eventually falls pregnant to him.

== Cast ==
- Viveca Lindfors as Emma
- Arnold Sjöstrand as Ragnar Botvide
- Gunnar Sjöberg as Nicklas Botvide
- Britta Holmberg as Agnes
- Artur Rolén as Jaken
- Carl Ström as Isaken
- Anna Olin as Sanna
- Helga Brofeldt as Ann-Kajsa
- Gösta Cederlund as Vicar
- Nils Ekman as Klemens, teacher
- Axel Högel as Doctor
- Anders Nyström as Lill-Nicklas
- Henrik Schildt as Wallin, preacher
- Artur Cederborgh as Guest at the wedding
- Lillie Wästfeldt as Guest at the wedding
- Jullan Jonsson as Cook at the wedding
- Birger Åsander as Drunk man

== Bibliography ==
- Qvist, Per Olov & von Bagh, Peter. Guide to the Cinema of Sweden and Finland. Greenwood Publishing Group, 2000.
- Wallengren, Ann-Kristin. Welcome Home Mr Swanson: Swedish Emigrants and Swedishness on Film. Nordic Academic Press, 2014.
