= I Killed =

1943 film

- Directed by: Olof Molander
- Written by: Victor Borg (play); Toralf Sandø; Olof Molander
- Produced by: Rune Waldekranz
- Starring: Anders Henrikson; Arnold Sjöstrand; Irma Christenson
- Cinematography: Göran Strindberg
- Edited by: Lennart Wallén
- Music by: Jules Sylvain
- Production company: Sandrews
- Distributed by: Sandrew-Baumanfilm
- Release date: 27 October 1943
- Running time: 86 minutes
- Country: Sweden
- Language: Swedish

I Killed or I Slew (Swedish: Jag dräpte) is a 1943 Swedish drama film directed by Olof Molander and starring Anders Henrikson, Arnold Sjöstrand and Irma Christenson. It was shot at the Centrumateljéerna Studios in Stockholm. The film's sets were designed by the art director Bibi Lindström. It is a remake of the 1942 Norwegian film Jeg drepte!.

== Synopsis ==
A surgeon believes he has killed a man on the operating table.

== Cast ==
- Anders Henrikson as Hans Greger
- Arnold Sjöstrand as Richard Cornell
- Irma Christenson as Liv Cornell
- Tollie Zellman as Mrs. Lilly Smith
- Marianne Löfgren as Mrs. Berg
- Hilda Borgström as Miss Ruth Miller
- Gunnar Sjöberg as Martin
- Alf Kjellin as Harris
- Tore Lindwall as Paul Rogers
- Gunnar Björnstrand as Lindén
- Gabriel Alw as Dr. Zander
- Siri Olson as Nurse Berit
- Mai Zetterling as Miss Peters
- Aurore Palmgren as Head Nurse
- Anna Lindahl as Mrs. Tomsen
- Kolbjörn Knudsen as Allen
- Lennart Holmqvist as Medical Candidate
- Nils Dahlgren as Butler
- John Botvid as Mr. Smith
- Margareta Fahlén as Nurse Vera
- Marianne Gyllenhammar as Nurse
- Mimi Nelson as Nurse
- Gunnel Wadner as Switchboard Operator

== Bibliography ==
- Qvist, Per Olov & von Bagh, Peter. Guide to the Cinema of Sweden and Finland. Greenwood Publishing Group, 2000.
