= Count Only the Happy Moments =

1944 film by Rune Carlsten

- Directed by: Rune Carlsten
- Written by: Arne Mattsson; Jules Sylvain; Lars Tessing
- Based on: Une veuve by Guy de Maupassant
- Produced by: Sven Nygren
- Starring: Sonja Wigert; Arnold Sjöstrand; Olof Widgren
- Cinematography: Karl-Erik Alberts
- Music by: Jules Sylvain
- Production company: Film AB Lux
- Distributed by: Film AB Lux
- Release date: 8 August 1944
- Running time: 120 minutes
- Country: Sweden
- Language: Swedish

Count Only the Happy Moments (Swedish: Räkna de lyckliga stunderna blott) is a 1944 Swedish historical drama film directed by Rune Carlsten and starring Sonja Wigert, Arnold Sjöstrand and Olof Widgren. It was shot at the Centrumateljéerna Studios in Stockholm and on location in the Old Town and in Uppsala. The film's sets were designed by the art director Bertil Duroj. It is based on the 1882 Guy de Maupassant short story Une veuve ("A widow").

== Synopsis ==
Dressmaker Annemarie falls in love with rising businessman Viktor Branzell, but his middle-class family disapprove of her humble origins.

== Cast ==
- Sonja Wigert as Annemarie Wikström
- Arnold Sjöstrand as Viktor Branzell
- Olof Widgren as Bengt Ljung
- Hugo Björne as Branzell Sr.
- Gerda Lundequist as Mrs. Branzell
- Åke Grönberg as Sven Bergling
- John Ekman as Benson
- Barbro Ribbing as Harriet Benson
- Yngve Nordwall as Ragnar Normark
- Tekla Sjöblom as Mrs. Normark
- Birger Malmsten as Helge Wikström
- Britta Holmberg as Ingrid
- Curt Masreliez as Alf Branzell
- Anita Björk as Lilian Lind
- John Westin as Karsten
- Eva Dahlbeck as Hedvig
- Ruth Weijden as Charlotte
- Magnus Rudbeck as Variety singer
- Wiktor Andersson as Groom
- Olof Bergström as Speaker at the engagement dinner
- Millan Bolander as Nurse
- Mona Geijer-Falkner as Annemarie's landlady
- Gunnar Johansson as Band leader at Sveasalen
- Henrik Schildt as Student
- Eva Stiberg as Normark's maid

== Bibliography ==
- Qvist, Per Olov & von Bagh, Peter. Guide to the Cinema of Sweden and Finland. Greenwood Publishing Group, 2000.
