= The Night Watchman's Wife =

1947 film

- Directed by: Bengt Palm
- Written by: Sune Bergström; Torsten Flodén
- Starring: Åke Grönberg; Britta Holmberg; Sture Lagerwall
- Cinematography: Walter Boberg
- Edited by: Eric Nordemar
- Music by: Gunnar Johansson
- Production company: Centrumfilm
- Distributed by: Wivefilm
- Release date: 20 October 1947
- Running time: 90 minutes
- Country: Sweden
- Language: Swedish

The Night Watchman's Wife (Swedish: Nattvaktens hustru) is a 1947 Swedish drama film directed by Bengt Palm and starring Åke Grönberg, Britta Holmberg and Sture Lagerwall. It was shot at the Centrumateljéerna Studios in Stockholm and on location around the city. The film's sets were designed by the art director Bertil Duroj.

== Synopsis ==
Ingegerd arrives in Stockholm from the countryside to live with her sister. She encounters the charming Curt at Stockholm Central Station but then loses touch with him. Finding that her sister has died, and she has nowhere to go, she wanders the streets. She is eventually taken in by a kindly nightwatchmen, and they marry soon afterwards. Sometime later, however, she accidentally runs into Curt again who tries to charm her away. However, she ultimately stays loyal to her husband.

== Cast ==
- Åke Grönberg as Gunnar Eklund
- Britta Holmberg as Ingegerd Lindberg
- Sture Lagerwall as Curt Brehmer
- Thor Modéen as Sausage salesman
- Douglas Håge as Cafe-keeper
- Åke Claesson as Baron
- Naima Wifstrand as Mrs. Eklund
- Allan Bohlin as Policeman
- Hugo Björne as Göransson
- Linnéa Hillberg as Mrs. Lindberg
- Astrid Bodin as Lindberg's Maid
- Helga Brofeldt as Angry neighbor
- Carla Eck as Nurse
- Siv Ericks as Waitress
- Gösta Ericsson as Man in staircase
- Barbro Flodquist as Elna
- Arne Källerud as Gunnar's friend at work
- Mimi Nelson as Curt's friend
- Carl Reinholdz as Gunnar's colleague
- Olav Riégo as Gentleman at company party
- Viveca Serlachius as Waitress
- Gunnar Sjöberg as Managing Director
- Hans Strååt as Doctor
- Carl Ström as Mr. Lindberg
- Ivar Wahlgren as Constable
- Torsten Winge as Fashion Director

== Bibliography ==
- Krawc, Alfred. International Directory of Cinematographers, Set- and Costume Designers in Film: Denmark, Finland, Norway, Sweden (from the beginnings to 1984). Saur, 1986.
- Qvist, Per Olov & von Bagh, Peter. Guide to the Cinema of Sweden and Finland. Greenwood Publishing Group, 2000.
