= The Rose of Tistelön =

1945 film

- Directed by: Åke Ohberg
- Written by: Rune Waldekranz; Torsten Flodén
- Based on: The Rose of Tistelön by Emilie Flygare-Carlén
- Produced by: Rune Waldekranz
- Starring: Eva Henning; John Ekman; Arnold Sjöstrand
- Cinematography: Göran Strindberg
- Edited by: Lennart Wallén
- Music by: Lars-Erik Larsson
- Production company: Sandrews
- Distributed by: Sandrew-Baumanfilm
- Release date: 6 August 1945
- Running time: 104 minutes
- Country: Sweden
- Language: Swedish

The Rose of Tistelön (Swedish: Rosen på Tistelön) is a 1945 Swedish historical romantic drama film directed by Åke Ohberg and starring Eva Henning, John Ekman and Arnold Sjöstrand. It was shot at the Centrumateljéerna Studios in Stockholm. The film's sets were designed by the art director Bibi Lindström. It is based on the 1842 novel The Rose of Tistelön by Emilie Flygare-Carlén.

== Synopsis ==
In Bohuslän during the nineteenth century, the daughter of a notorious smuggler falls in love with the son of a customs officer.

== Cast ==
- Eva Henning as Gabriella Haraldsson
- John Ekman as Håkan, hennes far
- Arnold Sjöstrand as Birger, hennes bror
- Bengt Ekerot as Anton, hennes bror
- Marianne Löfgren as Erika
- George Fant as Arve Arnman
- Gunnar Sjöberg as Arnman senior, Arves far
- Linnéa Hillberg as Katrina, Arves mor
- Oscar Ljung as Kapten Rosenberg
- Olof Winnerstrand as Askenberg
- Rune Halvarsson as Petter Lindgren, jungman
- Siri Olson as Lena
- Inga Landgré as Josefine
- Gösta Gustafson as Simon jaktkarl
- Ernst Brunman as Länsman
- Georg Skarstedt as Lutter, Farmhand
- Henrik Schildt as Mårten
- John Elfström as First Mate
- Birger Åsander as Boat Man
- Artur Cederborgh asPostal clerk
- Gustaf Färingborg as Police Officer
- Segol Mann as Crew Member

== Bibliography ==
- Forslund, Bengt. Victor Sjöström: hans liv och verk. TPB, 1980.
- Krawc, Alfred. International Directory of Cinematographers, Set- and Costume Designers in Film: Denmark, Finland, Norway, Sweden (from the beginnings to 1984). Saur, 1986.
