= Åke Grönberg =

Swedish actor (1914–1969)

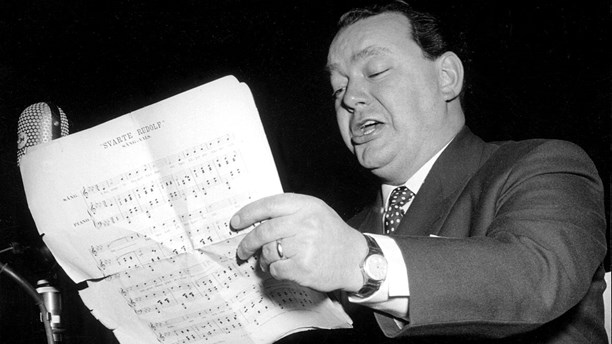
- Grönberg in 1955
- Born: Karl Åke Edvard Grönberg; 26 March 1914; Stockholm, Sweden
- Died: 15 September 1969 (aged 55); Stockholm, Sweden
- Occupations: Actor, singer
- Years active: 1936–1969
- Spouse(s): Rut Holm (m. 1941–1946) Sonja Lund (m. 1955–1969)

Karl Åke Edvard Grönberg (26 March 1914 – 15 September 1969) was a Swedish film actor who appeared in nearly 100 films. Grönberg was a versatile stage personality of his day, performing as a singer, variety artist, actor, in musical shows and in dramatic productions. He was born in Stockholm, Sweden, and died of a heart attack in 1969.

== Selected filmography ==
- 65, 66 and I (1936) - Castle guard (uncredited)
- Russian Flu (1937) - Åhörare i studentmössa (uncredited)
- Klart till drabbning (1937) - Waiter (uncredited)
- Comrades in Uniform (1938) - Bonzo (uncredited)
- Thunder and Lightning (1938) - Chucker-out (uncredited)
- Med folket för fosterlandet (1938) - Printing clerk (uncredited)
- Just a Bugler (1938) - Ensign musician (uncredited)
- Only One Night (1939) - Young Man (uncredited)
- Adolf i eld och lågor (1939) - Photographer (uncredited)
- Hennes lilla majestät (1939) - Fighter (uncredited)
- Melodin från Gamla Stan (1939) - Andersson
- We at Solglantan (1939) - Svensson
- Kronans käcka gossar (1940) - 55 Lasse Björk
- Heroes in Yellow and Blue (1940) - Soldier (uncredited)
- Karusellen går... (1940) - Carnival Guard
- Alle man på post (1940) - Landgren
- Beredskapspojkar (1940) - Manne Melin
- Söderpojkar (1941) - Tjabo
- Woman on Board (1941) - Andersson
- Vårat gäng (1942) - Jonne
- En sjöman i frack (1942) - Alling
- En trallande jänta (1942) - Oscar
- Tomorrow's Melody (1942) - Manager at record department
- The Yellow Clinic (1942) - Herman Karlsson
- Rospiggar (1942) - Gurra
- Take Care of Ulla (1942) - Bigge Berglund
- Nothing Is Forgotten (1942) - Blommen
- Halta Lottas krog (1942) - Åke
- Kvinnan tar befälet (1942) - Holger Bastberg
- I brist på bevis (1943) - Jerker
- Captured by a Voice (1943) - Nicke Blom
- The Sin of Anna Lans (1943) - Axel
- Young Blood (1943) - Gustaf Johansson
- Sonja (1943) - Kurt Larsson
- Count Only the Happy Moments (1944) - Sven Bergling
- Se opp för spioner! (1944) - Sluggo
- Maria of Kvarngarden (1945) - Jakob
- Flickor i hamn (1945) - Axel
- I Roslagens famn (1945) - Frithiof Andersson
- The Girls in Smaland (1945) - Gunnar
- Brita in the Merchant's House (1946) - Arvid
- Stiliga Augusta (1946) - Forceland
- Between Brothers (1946) - Bengtsson, driver
- Song of Stockholm (1947) - Åke
- Woman Without a Face (1947) - Sam Svensson
- The Night Watchman's Wife (1947) - Gunnar Eklund
- Rail Workers (1947) - Calle-Ville
- Each to His Own Way (1948) - Gösta Sund
- Life Starts Now (1948) - Berra
- Dangerous Spring (1949) - Kalle Larsson
- Restaurant Intim (1950) - Kalle Söderberg
- Påhittiga Johansson (1950) - Påhittiga Johansson
- The Kiss on the Cruise (1950) - Knutte Glans
- Beef and the Banana (1951) - Biffen
- Skipper in Stormy Weather (1951) - Singer
- Livat på luckan (1951) - Conscript / 55 Lasse Björk
- Blondie, Beef and the Banana (1952) - Biffen Johansson
- She Came Like the Wind (1952) - Fabian Rosander
- Summer with Monika (1953) - Verkmästaren, Harrys arbetskamrat
- Folket i fält (1953) - Sven Pettersson
- Barabbas (1953) - Armful Watchman at Rome
- We Three Debutantes (1953) - Swedish John
- Sawdust and Tinsel (1953) - Albert Johansson
- Flottans glada gossar (1954) - Eskil Bladh
- Sju svarta be-hå (1954) - Sture Kaxe
- Aldrig med min kofot eller... Drömtjuven (1954) - Knutte Modig
- Storm Over Tjurö (1954) - Reinhold Karlsson
- A Lesson in Love (1954) - Carl-Adam
- Brudar och bollar (1954) - Wille Svensson
- Simon the Sinner (1954) - Lund
- Herr Arnes penningar (1954) - Innkeeper
- The Vicious Breed (1954) - House Owner
- Far och flyg (1955) - Hagfors
- Karusellen i fjällen (1955) - Porter
- Friarannonsen (1955) - Patron Berg
- Paradise (1955) - Betil Karlsson
- Luffaren och Rasmus (1955) - Paradis-Oskar
- The Hard Game (1956) - Andy Ekström
- Encounters in the Twilight (1957) - Roffe Sköld
- Klarar Bananen Biffen? (1957) - Biffen
- Line Six (1958) - Charlie
- Space Invasion of Lapland (1959) - Dr. Henrik
- 91:an Karlsson muckar (tror han) (1959) - Doctor
- Pirates on the Malonen (1959) - Frasse Flinta
- Adam och Eva (1963) - Rulle
- Min kära är en ros (1963) - Edling
- 491 (1964) - Reverend Mild
- Loving Couples (1964) - The fat man
- Ett sommaräventyr (1965) - Erik's father
- Hej du glada sommar!!! (1965) - Valle Väster
- Kråkguldet (1969, TV Series) - Gustav Lagerström (final appearance)

== Discography ==
AKE GRONBERG by Ake Gronberg. (U.S.A. Cadence Records #CLP 5002)
