= Gudrun Brost =

Swedish actress (1910–1993)

- Born: Gudrun Lisa Johanna Brost; 6 April 1910; Malmö, Sweden
- Died: 28 June 1993 (aged 83); Stockholm, Sweden
- Occupation: Actress
- Years active: 1936–1986

Gudrun Lisa Johanna Brost (6 April 1910 – 28 June 1993) was a Swedish actress. She appeared in more than 40 films between 1936 and 1986.

== Partial filmography ==
- Conscientious Objector Adolf (1936) - Woman at party (uncredited)
- Janssons frestelse (1936) - Flicka på festen (uncredited)
- Poor Millionaires (1936) - Hotel guest
- The Andersson Family (1937) - Lisa
- Stål (1940) - Aina Gouveng
- June Night (1940) - Fru Nilsson
- A Real Man (1940) - Monica (uncredited)
- Hans nåds testamente (1940) - Beda
- Fröken Kyrkråtta (1941) - Party Guest (uncredited)
- The Talk of the Town (1941) - Greta Bilt
- In Paradise (1941) - Klara
- Magistrarna på sommarlov (1941) - Elsa, servitris (uncredited)
- If I Could Marry the Minister (1941) - Helga Persson of Mon
- The Yellow Clinic (1942) - Nurse Olga
- The Heavenly Play (1942) - King Salomo's mistress
- The Sin of Anna Lans (1943) - Magda
- ...och alla dessa kvinnor (1944) - Mrs. Gordon-Brewster
- Kungliga patrasket (1945) - Hans fynd
- Man's Woman (1945) - Elin
- Lata Lena och blåögda Per (1947) - Dagmar Liljekvist
- Sven Tusan (1949) - Mrs. Winsten
- Flicka och hyacinter (1950) - Körner's Friend
- In Lilac Time (1952) - Alexandra Weijner
- Sawdust and Tinsel (1953) - Alma
- Ung man söker sällskap (1954) - Fru Boman
- Luffaren och Rasmus (1955) - Märta
- The Seventh Seal (1957) - Woman at inn (uncredited)
- The Minister of Uddarbo (1957) - Albertina, aka Gäs-Fröken
- The Virgin Spring (1960) - Frida
- Chans (1962) - Store Owner
- Ormen (1966) - Maria Sandström
- Här har du ditt liv (1966) - Olof's Stepmother
- Hour of the Wolf (1968) - Gamla Fru von Merkens
- ...som havets nakna vind (1968) - Torinna
- De många sängarna (1970) - Rut
- Ebon Lundin (1973) - Lilly
- Gangsterfilmen (1974) - Anna Nilsson
- Tabu (1977) - Linda
- Moderna människor (1983) - The grandmother
- Äntligen! (1984) - Rut
