= The Sin of Anna Lans =

1943 film

- Directed by: Rune Carlsten
- Written by: Paul Baudisch; Adolf Schütz
- Starring: Viveca Lindfors
- Release date: 20 August 1943
- Running time: 120 minutes
- Country: Sweden
- Language: Swedish

The Sin of Anna Lans (Swedish: Anna Lans) is a 1943 Swedish drama film directed by Rune Carlsten.

== Cast ==
- Viveca Lindfors as Anna Lans
- Arnold Sjöstrand as Olle Olsson
- Gudrun Brost as Magda
- Åke Grönberg as Axel
- Lisskulla Jobs as Birgit Lans
- Nils Lundell as Grönkvist
- Rune Carlsten as Bertil Agne
- Harriet Bosse as Baroness Löwenfeldt
- Hjördis Petterson as Mrs. Herlen
- Hugo Björne as Maj. Hellström
