= Man's Way with Women =

1934 film directed by Per-Axel Branner

- Directed by: Per-Axel Branner
- Written by: Ragnar Hyltén-Cavallius
- Based on: The Song of the Blood-Red Flower by Johannes Linnankoski
- Starring: Edvin Adolphson; Inga Tidblad; Birgit Tengroth; Anna Lindahl; Gull-Maj Norin; Anders Henrikson
- Cinematography: Julius Jaenzon
- Music by: Ilmari Hannikainen
- Distributed by: AB Wivefilm
- Release date: 12 November 1934
- Running time: 96 minutes
- Country: Sweden
- Language: Swedish

Man's Way with Women (Swedish: Sången om den eldröda blomman) is a 1934 Swedish romantic drama film directed by Per-Axel Branner. It is based on the 1905 Finnish novel The Song of the Blood-Red Flower by Johannes Linnankoski.

The interior shots of the film were shot at Råsunda's Filmstaden studios and the exterior scenes in Uppland, Ramsele and Långsele. The film premiered at the Röda Kvarn theatre in Stockholm on November 12, 1934. The film's US release was in 1937.

Dwain Esper picked this Swedish drama for US distribution because it contained a nude swim. Esper would then create a "mind-boggling English dub", and a lurid promotion campaign for the film.

== Cast ==
- Edvin Adolphson as Olof Koskela
- Inga Tidblad as Kyllikki
- Birgit Tengroth as "Dark Eye"
- Anna Lindahl as "Motherwort"
- Gull-Maj Norin as "Gazelle"
- Marianne Löfgren as Elliina Virttanen
- Aino Taube as Annikki
- John Ekman as Olof's father
- Gertrud Pålson-Wettergren as Olof's mother
- Anders Henrikson as Antti, Kyllikki's cousin
- Sven Bergvall as Kyllikki's father
