= The Heavenly Play =

1942 film

- Directed by: Alf Sjöberg
- Written by: Rune Lindström; Alf Sjöberg
- Starring: Rune Lindström
- Cinematography: Gösta Roosling
- Release date: 21 December 1942
- Running time: 106 minutes
- Country: Sweden
- Language: Swedish

The Heavenly Play (Swedish: Himlaspelet) is a 1942 Swedish drama film directed by Alf Sjöberg.

== Plot ==
The young peasants Mats and Marit are about to marry when a disease breaks out in their village. Marit gets accused of being a witch and sentenced to death. After she has been burnt alive Mats leaves the village and seeks a way to make God sending Marit back from heaven onto earth. He fails and loses his personal integrity. Marlit has to ask God to intervene before the devil can take Mats. God shows mercy by reuniting Mats and Marit in heaven.

== Cast ==
- Rune Lindström as Mats Ersson
- Eivor Landström as Marit Knutsdotter
- Anders Henrikson as Our Lord
- Holger Löwenadler as King Salomo
- Gudrun Brost as King Salomo's mistress
- Arnold Sjöstrand as Juvas Anders, painter
- Emil Fjellström as Gammel-Jerk
- Nils Gustafsson as blind man at the road
- Hugo Björne as prophet Elias
- Torsten Winge as Jonas
- Erik Hell as Jon Persson
- Åke Claesson as Profet Jeremiah (as Åke Claeson)
- Björn Berglund as Josef
- Inga-Lilly Forsström as Virgin Mary (as Inga Lilly Forsström)
- Lisskulla Jobs as country woman
- Anita Björk as Anna Jesper
