= Irma Christenson =

Swedish actress (1915–1993)

- Born: 14 January 1915; Hunnebostrand, Sweden
- Died: 21 February 1993 (aged 78); Sweden
- Occupation: Actor

Irma Christenson (14 January 1915 – 21 February 1993) was a Swedish actress notable for her many roles in the Royal Dramatic Theatre in Stockholm, and in many films.

Christenson was born in the small village of Hunnebostrand. She studied at the Royal Dramatic Theatre from 1933 to 1936.

She married the writer Per-Erik Rundquist and with him had a son, Mikael Rundquist, also an actor.

== Selected filmography ==
- Adventure (1936)
- Emilie Högquist, 1939
- Home from Babylon (1941)
- Doctor Glas, 1942
- It Is My Music (1942)
- I Killed (1943)
- Gentleman with a Briefcase (1943)
- The Invisible Wall (1944)
- Live Dangerously (1944)
- You Who Are About to Enter, 1945
- Maria of Kvarngarden (1945)
- The Sixth Commandment (1947)
- Neglected by His Wife (1947)
- The Loveliest Thing on Earth (1947)
- Prison, 1949
- Restaurant Intim (1950)
- When Love Came to the Village (1950)
- Two Stories Up (1950)
- One Summer of Happiness, 1951
- Divorced, 1951
- A Goat in the Garden (1958)
- The Best Intentions, 1992
- Sunday's Children, 1992
