= Linnéa Hillberg =

Swedish actress

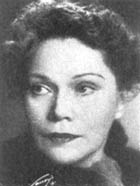
- Linnéa Hillberg, ca 1940s
- Born: Linnéa Paulina Nilsson; 26 October 1892; Uddevalla, Sweden-Norway
- Died: 3 July 1977 (aged 84); Stockholm, Sweden
- Occupation: Actress
- Years active: 1913–1974

Linnéa Paulina Hillberg née Nilsson; 26 October 1892 – 3 July 1977) was a Swedish actress.

== Biography ==
Born in Uddevalla on the Swedish west coast, Linnéa Hillberg made her stage debut in 1913. Early on she acted (1914–18) with the Karin Swanström Theatre Company and 1920–27 she was part of Ernst Eklund's Komediteatern (The Comedy Theatre). In between and during this time she appeared in a number of early Swedish silent films. She worked at Lorensbergsteatern in Gothenburg 1927–34 and at several private theatres in Stockholm, including Vasateatern during Gösta Ekman's management. Also worked at the Royal Dramatic Theatre for some years (1938–41) but later in the forties became part of the Norrköping-Linköping City Theatre, together with her husband. Made on stage critically acclaimed appearances in a number of classic parts; as Lady Macbeth in Shakespeare's Macbeth and Queen Gertrude in Hamlet, as both Mrs. Alving and Regina in Ibsen's Ghosts (different stagings) and as Gina Ekdahl in The Wild Duck; as Laura in Strindberg's The Father and as Claire Zachanassian in Dürrenmatt's The Visit. She toured extentively with the National Swedish Touring Theatre for years in the 1950s and was from 1960 part of the first ensemble at Stockholm City Theatre.

During her career, she worked sporadically in films and makes notable appearances in Norrtullsligan (1923), Pensionat Paradiset (1937), Adolf klarar skivan (Adolf Saves the Day) (1938), Med folket för fosterlandet (1938), Lågor i dunklet (1942) (directed by Hasse Ekman), Kungsgatan (1943), Flickan och djävulen (1944), Maria på Kvarngården (1945), Kvinna utan ansikte (Woman Without a Face) (1947) (script by Ingmar Bergman), Giftas (1955), Sången om den eldröda blomman (1956) and Korridoren (1973).

== Personal life ==
She was married to the actor Torsten Hillberg from 1919 until his death in 1954.

== Selected filmography ==
- Anna-Clara and Her Brothers (1923)
- Iron Wills (1923)
- Kalle Utter (1925)
- Walpurgis Night (1935)
- Hotel Paradise (1937)
- For Better, for Worse (1938)
- The Great Love (1938)
- Adolf Saves the Day (1938)
- Wanted (1939)
- The People of Högbogården (1939)
- Kiss Her! (1940)
- The Talk of the Town (1941)
- The Fight Continues (1941)
- If I Could Marry the Minister (1941)
- Night in Port (1943)
- Katrina (1943)
- Kungsgatan (1943)
- Captured by a Voice (1943)
- I Am Fire and Air (1944)
- My People Are Not Yours (1944)
- The Girl and the Devil (1944)
- Maria of Kvarngarden (1945)
- The Rose of Tistelön (1945)
- Brita in the Merchant's House (1946)
- The Night Watchman's Wife (1947)
- I Love You Karlsson (1947)
- The Realm of the Rye (1950)
- Getting Married (1955)
- Paradise (1955)
- My Passionate Longing (1956)
- The Song of the Scarlet Flower (1956)
- Encounters in the Twilight (1957)
- A Dreamer's Journey (1957)
