= Åke Ohberg =

Swedish actor

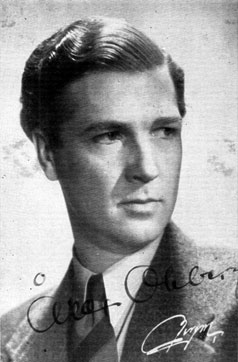
- Born: 20 July 1905; Västerås, Sweden
- Died: 18 July 1975 (aged 69); Spain
- Occupations: Actor, film director
- Years active: 1932–1961
- Spouses: Birgit Chenon (m. 1930) Kerstin "Peggy" Lindberg (m. 1937)

Åke Ohberg (20 July 1905 – 18 July 1975) was a Swedish actor and film director. He appeared in about 30 roles in films between 1932 and 1961.

Ohberg was born to Johan and Hilda Ohberg in Västerås, Sweden.

== Marriage and Family ==
He married actress Birgit Chenon but that marriage did not last. He married actress Peggy Lindberg in 1937, a union that lasted until his death. They had two children, a daughter Ingert and a son Anders.

== Selected filmography ==
- Servant's Entrance (1932)
- Two Men and a Widow (1933)
- The Dangerous Game (1933)
- The Marriage Game (1935)
- Kungen kommer (1936)
- Art for Art's Sake (1938)
- Landstormens lilla Lotta (1939)
- Frestelse (1940)
- Hanna in Society (1940)
- They Staked Their Lives (1940)
- With Open Arms (1940)
- Snapphanar (1941)
- Lucky Young Lady (1941)
- Nothing Is Forgotten (1942)
- Elvira Madigan (1943)
- Stopp! Tänk på något annat (1944)
- Blizzard (1944)
- The Rose of Tistelön (1945)
- Brita in the Merchant's House (1946)
- Dynamite (1947)
- The People of Simlang Valley (1947)
- Vi flyr på Rio (1949)
- My Friend Oscar (1951)
- The Chieftain of Göinge (1953)
- The Summer Wind Blows (1955)
