= Olof Widgren =

Swedish actor

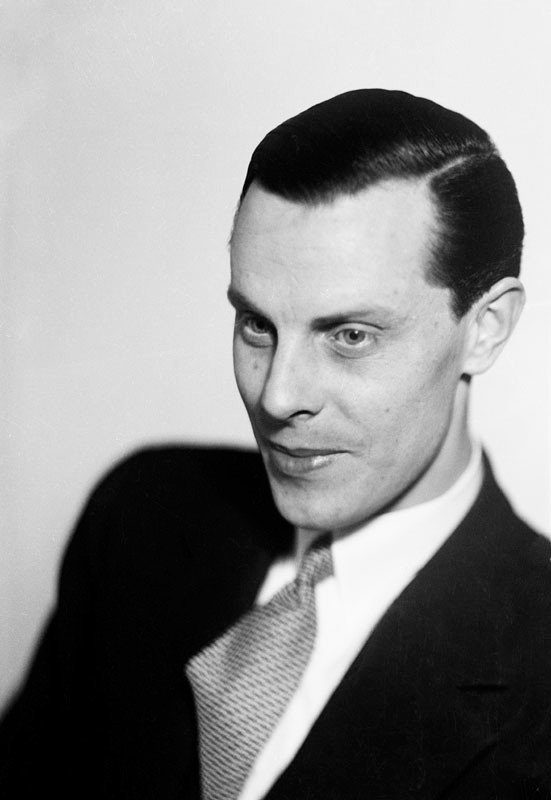
- Born: Johan Olof Pettersson; 9 June 1907; Stockholm, Sweden
- Died: 6 March 1999 (aged 91); Stockholm, Sweden
- Occupation: Actor
- Spouses: Nancy Peiram (m. 1933–1942) Mireille Hammar (m. 1943–1959) Anni Kihlgren (m. 1963)
- Children: 4
- Relatives: Helena Bergström (granddaughter)

Johan Olof Widgren, né Pettersson (9 June 1907 – 6 March 1999) was a Swedish stage and film actor. He won the Eugene O'Neill Award in 1967. He was awarded the Illis quorum by the Swedish government in 1989. He began by acting in student theater before studying at the Royal Dramatic Training Academy from 1928 to 1931.

Actress Helena Bergström is his granddaughter.

== Selected filmography ==
- Ulla, My Ulla (1930)
- Perhaps a Poet (1933)
- Walpurgis Night (1935)
- Career (1938)
- Home from Babylon (1941)
- Life and Death (1943)
- Young Blood (1943)
- The Sixth Shot (1943)
- Gentleman with a Briefcase (1943)
- Count Only the Happy Moments (1944)
- I Am Fire and Air (1944)
- The Serious Game (1945)
- Only a Mother (1949)
- Karin Månsdotter (1954)
- Tarps Elin (1956)
- No Tomorrow (1957)
