= Appassionata (1944 film) =

1944 film by Olof Molander

- Directed by: Olof Molander
- Starring: Georg Rydeberg
- Cinematography: Karl-Erik Alberts
- Release date: 2 February 1944
- Running time: 108 minutes
- Country: Sweden
- Language: Swedish

Appassionata is a 1944 Swedish drama film directed by Olof Molander.

== Cast ==
- Georg Rydeberg as Thomas Dahlhoff
- Viveca Lindfors as Maria
- Alf Kjellin as Eric
- Georg Funkquist as Hellenius
- Harriet Bosse as Fru Lenander
- Hilda Borgström as Jönsson
- Hans Strååt as Gösta
