= Kungsgatan (film) =

1943 film

- Directed by: Gösta Cederlund
- Starring: Barbro Kollberg
- Release date: 17 September 1943
- Running time: 96 minutes
- Country: Sweden
- Language: Swedish

Kungsgatan is a 1943 Swedish drama film directed by Gösta Cederlund.

== Cast ==
- Barbro Kollberg as Marta
- Sture Lagerwall as Adrian
- Marianne Löfgren as Dolly, prostitute
- Lisskulla Jobs as Cecilia, prostitute
- Barbro Flodquist as Viran, prostitute
- Stina Ståhle as Karossen, prostitute
- Viveka Linder as Lisa Ek, prostitute
- Naima Wifstrand as Caretaker's Wife
- Linnéa Hillberg as Marta's Mother
- Gösta Cederlund as Doctor
