= Jules Sylvain =

Swedish composer

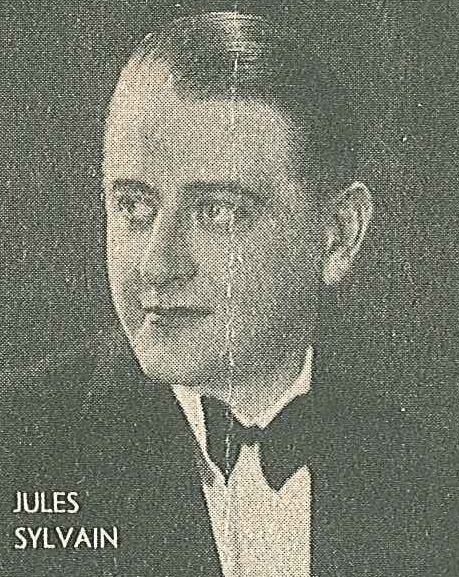
- Jules Sylvain in 1931

Background information
- Born: Axel Stig Hansson; 11 June 1890; Stockholm, Sweden
- Died: 29 October 1968 (aged 78) Castiglione della Pescaia, Italy
- Occupations: composer, screenwriter, musician

Axel Stig Hansson (11 June 1900 – 29 October 1968), known professionally as Jules Sylvain, was a Swedish composer, screenwriter and musician.

Sylvain was born in Stockholm to actor Axel Hansson and actress and pedagog Valborg Hansson. At the age of 11, Sylvain began studying music at Lundsbergs boarding school but ran away from the school after four years. He studied piano lessons at Musikaliska Akademien between 1918 and 1920 and then continued to study at Music high school in Weimar between 1920 and 1922. He got his first income in 1918 as a café pianist in Stockholm. After that he worked as a musician in Germany for a few years. At his home coming in 1923 he made a name for himself at Kristallsalongen with the melodi Det är den dagliga dosisen som gör'et. During 1925 until 1928, Sylvain was employed as a chapel master for Karl Gerhard and composed a number of the singer's songs.

As soon as the sound-film became established Sylvain started composing film music the first melody was Säg det i toner 1929, he was also for several years a musical advisor for Svensk Filmindustri. Sylvain composed several operettas the most known one is Zorina which had its premiere at the Stockholmsoperan in 1943. Sylvain also re-worked the music for the operetta The Merry Widow for its 1931 revival.

It is not completely known as to why Stig Hansson became Jules Sylvain sometime during the 1920s. One theory is that it was Ernst Rolf who thought that a successful composer could not have such a regular name as Stig Hansson. Another theory is that he looked in a lexicon and got his eyes on the French composer with the name Sylvain and then combined the first name of his youth favourite author Jules Verne. Another is that he admired the French composer Maurice Yvain, and because of that wanted a name that sounded similar.

== Known melodies ==
Bor du hemma hos din mamma (1926), Jag är ute när gumman min är inne (1926), Anna du kan väl stanna (1927), Får jag låna nyckeln, Ann-Marie (1929), Titta in i min lilla kajuta (1930), Beate-Christine (1931), Ett litet svärmeri (1931), Tangokavaljeren (1932), När tvenne hjärtan slå samma slag (1933), Vintergatan (1936), Klart till drabbning (1937), Med en enkel tulipan (1938), Det kommer en vår (1940), Jag vet ett litet hotell (1940), Vi har så mycket att säga varandra (1940), Löjtnantshjärtan (1942), Räkna de lyckliga stunderna blott (1944), Sång om syrsor (1961) och De stora elefanternas dans (1966).

== Selected filmography ==
- Father and Son (1930)
- The False Millionaire (1931)
- Colourful Pages (1931)
- Ship Ahoy! (1931)
- Tired Theodore (1931)
- His Life's Match (1932)
- Mother-in-Law's Coming (1932)
- International Match (1932)
- Dear Relatives (1933)
- Love and Dynamite (1933)
- Marriageable Daughters (1933)
- What Do Men Know? (1933)
- The Song to Her (1934)
- A Wedding Night at Stjarnehov (1934)
- Eva Goes Aboard (1934)
- The Atlantic Adventure (1934)
- The Marriage Game (1935)
- Adventure (1936)
- He, She and the Money (1936)
- The Wedding Trip (1936)
- 65, 66 and I (1936)
- Unfriendly Relations (1936)
- Sara Learns Manners (1937)
- Oh, Such a Night! (1937)
- Hotel Paradise (1937)
- Good Friends and Faithful Neighbours (1938)
- Variety Is the Spice of Life (1939)
- Emilie Högquist (1939)
- Whalers (1939)
- Nothing But the Truth (1939)
- Only One Night (1939)
- Goransson's Boy (1941)
- Poor Ferdinand (1941)
- Tomorrow's Melody (1942)
- It Is My Music (1942)
- Life and Death (1943)
- I Killed (1943)
- In Darkest Smaland (1943)
- The Brothers' Woman (1943)
- Count Only the Happy Moments (1944)
- The Forest Is Our Heritage (1944)
- Maria of Kvarngarden (1945)
- Black Roses (1945)
- Kristin Commands (1946)
- Peggy on a Spree (1946)
- Harald the Stalwart (1946)
- Incorrigible (1946)
- Soldier's Reminder (1947)
- Sin (1948)
- Loffe the Tramp (1948)
- Restaurant Intim (1950)
- My Name Is Puck (1951)
- Bom the Flyer (1952)
- Taxi 13 (1954)
- Dance on Roses (1954)
- The Magnificent Lie (1955)
- Laughing in the Sunshine (1956)
- A Little Nest (1956)
