= The Realm of the Rye =

The Realm of the Rye may refer to:

- The Realm of the Rye (1929 film), Swedish silent film
- The Realm of the Rye (1950 film), Swedish film
