= Tjorven (disambiguation) =

Tjorven is a fictional character created by Swedish writer Astrid Lindgren.

Tjorven may also refer to:

- Tjorven (vehicle), a Swedish manufactured delivery van
- Tjörven De Brul, Belgium international footballer
- Tjorven, nickname of Swedish swimmer Eva Andersson

== See also ==
- Samuel Torvend, American theologian
