= Vägen till Klockrike =

1948 novel by Harry Martinson

- First edition
- Author: Harry Martinson
- Language: Swedish
- Published: 1948
- Publisher: Bonnier
- Publication place: Sweden
- English publication date: 1955, Jonathan Cape

Vägen till Klockrike is a 1948 novel by Swedish writer Harry Martinson. It was translated into English and published as The Road by Jonathan Cape in 1955. It was adapted into a 1953 film The Road to Klockrike directed by Gunnar Skoglund.
