= Andersson's Kalle on Top Form =

1973 film

- Directed by: Arne Stivell
- Written by: Arne Stivell
- Based on: Andersson's Kalle by Emil Norlander
- Produced by: Arne Stivell
- Starring: Sickan Carlsson; Sten-Åke Cederhök; Britta Holmberg
- Cinematography: Jan Lindeström
- Edited by: Bengt Eriksson
- Music by: Charles Redland
- Production company: Interart
- Distributed by: FilmCenter Distribution AB
- Release date: 8 December 1973
- Running time: 85 minutes
- Country: Sweden
- Language: Swedish

Andersson's Kalle on Top Form (Swedish: Anderssonskans Kalle i busform) is a 1973 Swedish comedy film directed by Arne Stivell and starring Sickan Carlsson, Sten-Åke Cederhök and Britta Holmberg. It is a sequel to the 1972 film Andersson's Kalle which was itself based on the 1901 novel of the same title by Emil Norlander.

== Cast ==
- Tord Tjädersten as Kalle
- Sickan Carlsson as Anderssonskan
- Sten-Åke Cederhök as Jonsson
- Britta Holmberg as Pilgrenskan
- Per-Axel Arosenius as Teacher
- Hans Backlund as Policeman
- Inger Berggren as Cinema Cashier
- Barbro Bergius as Britt's Mother
- Gösta Bergqvist as Crook
- Erik Brander as Accordion Guy
- Gus Dahlström as School Janitor
- Jan Olof Danielsson as Stubben
- Nils Eklöv as Blaster
- Bertil Eriksson as Cinema Projectionist
- Lauritz Falk as Britt's Father
- Ragnar Frisk as Cinema Usher
- Leif Hellberg as Crook
- Rune Karlsson as Mover
- Lars Lennartsson as Valet
- Olle Leth as Police Commissioner
- Åke Lidcrantz as Store Clerk
- Tommy Lundell as Fritte
- Maria Petters-Gustafsson as Britt
- Hjördis Petterson as Mrs. Nilsson
- Arne Stivell as Head Teacher
- Leopold Svedberg as Old Man with Beard
- Magnus Tigerholm as Journalist
- Gunnel Wadner as Maid
- Chris Wahlström as Bobergskan
- James Wallén as Policeman
- Bengt Olof Wennerberg as Old Man at Cinema
- Åke Wästersjö as Mover

== Bibliography ==
- Holmstrom, John. The Moving Picture Boy: An International Encyclopaedia from 1895 to 1995, Norwich, Michael Russell, 1996
