= Andersson's Kalle (1972 film) =

1972 film

- Directed by: Arne Stivell
- Written by: Gits Olsson
- Based on: Andersson's Kalle by Emil Norlander
- Produced by: James Wallén
- Starring: Sickan Carlsson; Sten-Åke Cederhök; Britta Holmberg
- Cinematography: Jan Lindeström
- Edited by: Bengt Eriksson
- Music by: Charles Redland
- Production company: Film AB Cosmos
- Distributed by: FilmCenter Distribution AB
- Release date: 1 December 1972
- Running time: 102 minutes
- Country: Sweden
- Language: Swedish

Andersson's Kalle (Swedish: Anderssonskans Kalle) is a 1972 Swedish comedy film directed by Arne Stivell and starring Sickan Carlsson, Sten-Åke Cederhök and Britta Holmberg. It is based on the 1901 novel of the same title by Emil Norlander, which has been adapted into films on several occasions. It was followed by a sequel Andersson's Kalle on Top Form in 1973.

== Cast ==
- Tord Tjädersten as Kalle
- Sickan Carlsson as Anderssonskan
- Sten-Åke Cederhök as Jonsson
- Britta Holmberg as Pilgrenskan
- Chris Wahlström as Bobergskan
- Meta Velander as Camp Instructor
- Gunnel Wadner as Lövdahlskan
- Laila Westersund as Camp Maid
- Christer Lindgren as Berra
- Gus Dahlström as Möller
- Jan Olof Danielsson as Stubben
- Per-Axel Arosenius as Captain
- Kar de Mumma as Teacher
- Rolf Demander as Greengrocer's clerk
- John Harryson as Circus Manager
- Stig Johanson as Greengrocer
- Gösta Krantz as Steinhardt
- Lars Lennartsson as Berner
- Agneta Lindén as Makjen
- Börje Nyberg as Johansson
- Bo Persson as Policeman
- Peter Ridder as Gustaf
- Stellan Skantz as Teacher
- Magnus Tigerholm as Man
- Göran Wedsberg as Nerd

== Bibliography ==
- Qvist, Per Olov & von Bagh, Peter. Guide to the Cinema of Sweden and Finland. Greenwood Publishing Group, 2000.
