= Harryson =

Harryson is a Swedish surname, which means son of Harry. Notable people with the surname include:

- Peter Harryson (born 1948), Swedish actor, singer, and entertainer
- John Harryson (1926–2008), Swedish actor, father of Peter
- older spelling of Harrison family of Virginia

== See also ==
- Harrison (name)
