= Life in the Finnish Woods =

1947 film

- Directed by: Ivar Johansson
- Written by: Rune Waldekranz; Ivar Johansson
- Starring: Carl Jularbo; Naima Wifstrand; Barbro Ribbing
- Cinematography: Erik Blomberg
- Edited by: Ivar Johansson
- Music by: Gunnar Johansson
- Production company: Sandrews
- Distributed by: Sandrew-Baumanfilm
- Release date: 23 August 1947
- Running time: 92 minutes
- Country: Sweden
- Language: Swedish

Life in the Finnish Woods (Swedish: Livet i Finnskogarna) is a 1947 Swedish drama film directed by Ivar Johansson and starring Carl Jularbo, Naima Wifstrand and Barbro Ribbing. It was shot at the Centrumateljéerna Studios in Stockholm with location shooting around Bollnäs in Eastern Sweden. The film's sets were designed by the art director P.A. Lundgren. It takes its title from a 1913 waltz of the same title by Jularbo, whose signature tune it became.

== Synopsis ==
It is set in 1906 when Forest Finns settlers who set up their home in the plains of Sweden over the previous centuries still face the hostility from local Swedes.

== Cast ==
- Carl Jularbo as Self
- Naima Wifstrand as Mrs. Sigrid Malm
- Barbro Ribbing as Ingeborg Malm
- Bengt Logardt as Gunnar Malm
- Kenne Fant as Heikki Purje
- Mirjami Kuosmanen as Aino
- Sigbrit Molin as Ellen Bjurselius
- John Elfström as Simon Bäcklin
- Eric Laurent as Johan Lång
- Henning Ohlsson as Kolar-Jocke
- Torgny Anderberg as August
- Eivor Landström as Margit
- Nine-Christine Jönsson as Inger
- Carl Reinholdz as Mattias på Lagsta
- Nils Hultgren as Jon-Erik i Bråten
- Siegfried Fischer as Nils i Fallet
- Torsten Bergström as County constable

== Bibliography ==
- Qvist, Per Olov & von Bagh, Peter. Guide to the Cinema of Sweden and Finland. Greenwood Publishing Group, 2000.
