= Per-Axel Arosenius =

Swedish actor (1920–1981)

- Born: Per-Axel Daniel Rank Arosenius; 7 November 1920; Norberg, Sweden
- Died: 21 March 1981 (aged 60); Nacka, Sweden
- Cause of death: Burns from self-immolation
- Occupation: Actor
- Years active: 1941–1980

Per-Axel Daniel Rank Arosenius (7 November 1920 – 21 March 1981) was a Swedish film and television actor, primarily known for his supporting roles. His most prominent film role was that of Soviet defector Boris Kusenov in the thriller film Topaz (1969), directed by Alfred Hitchcock.

== Death ==
After a dispute with the Swedish taxation authorities, Arosenius protested by setting himself on fire outside their office in Nacka. He died at the age of 60 in the ambulance on the way to the hospital.

== Selected filmography ==
- Lasse-Maja (1941) – Man at the inn (uncredited)
- Lågor i dunklet (1942) – Student (uncredited)
- Man's Woman (1945) – Man in village
- 13 solar (1945) – Waiter at Café Royal
- Incorrigible (1946) – Teacher (uncredited)
- Krigsmans erinran (1947) – Soldier (uncredited)
- Kvarterets olycksfågel (1947) – Constable (uncredited)
- The Poetry of Ådalen (1947) – Lindskog
- Foreign Harbour (1948) – Watier (uncredited)
- Flottans kavaljerer (1948) – Kurre Karlsson's Buddy (uncredited)
- Sjösalavår (1949) – Man at Elvira's Party (scenes deleted)
- Big Lasse of Delsbo (1949) – Ekstedt
- Miss Julie (1951) – The count's friend (uncredited)
- Drömsemester (1952) – Policeman (uncredited)
- Kalle Karlsson of Jularbo (1952) – Olles kamrat (uncredited)
- For the Sake of My Intemperate Youth (1952) – Priest (scenes deleted)
- The Shadow (1953) – Journalist (uncredited)
- Kungen av Dalarna (1953) – Government member at cabinet meeting (uncredited)
- The Road to Klockrike (1953) – Dollys vän på Amerikabåten (uncredited)
- Café Lunchrasten (1954) – Police officer (uncredited)
- Darling of Mine (1955) – Policeman at Dalarö (uncredited)
- Whoops! (1955) – Police Officer (uncredited)
- Night Child (1956) – Plain-clothes policeman (uncredited)
- Kulla-Gulla (1956) – Man at the fire (uncredited)
- The Girl in Tails (1956) – Farm hand (uncredited)
- Johan på Snippen (1956) – Vicar
- The Lady in Black (1958)) – Johansson, Policeman (uncredited)
- Bara en kypare (1959) – Train Conductor (uncredited)
- A Matter of Morals (1961) – Taxi Driver
- Sällskapslek (1963) – Vicar (uncredited)
- En vacker dag (1963) – Tv-tittare (uncredited)
- Tre dar i buren (1963) – Aide-de-camp (uncredited)
- Komedi i Hägerskog (1968) – Ernfridsson
- Ni ljuger (1969) – Police officer (uncredited)
- Topaz (1969) – Boris Kusenov
- Grisjakten (1970) – Official
- Skräcken har 1000 ögon (1970) – X-ray Doctor
- Midsommardansen (1971)
- Maid in Sweden (1971) – Father
- Lockfågeln (1971) – Dr. Westman (uncredited)
- Chelovek s drugoy storony (1972) – Dr. Gunnar Hemlin
- Firmafesten (1972) – 'Luddes' daddy
- Andersson's Kalle (1972) – Captain
- Smutsiga fingrar (1973) – Kobalski, drug dealer (uncredited)
- Thriller - A Cruel Picture (1973) – Frigga's Father
- Andersson's Kalle on Top Form (1973) – Teacher
- Sängkamrater (1974) – Marianne's and Beryl's father
- What the Swedish Butler Saw (1975) – Rev. Faversham
- Faneflukt (1975) – Konsulent i UD
- Eddie og Suzanne (1975) – Swedish policeman
- Breaking Point (1975) – Guns and Ammo Dealer (uncredited)
- Release the Prisoners to Spring (1975) – Police officer
- I lust och nöd (1976) – Karl Fredrik Andersson
- Victor Frankenstein (1975) – The Inspector
- Bröderna Lejonhjärta (1977) – Tengil's Man
- Bröderna Lejonhjärta (1977)
- Mannen som blev miljonär (1980) – SÄPO-man
