= Charles Redland =

Swedish composer and musician

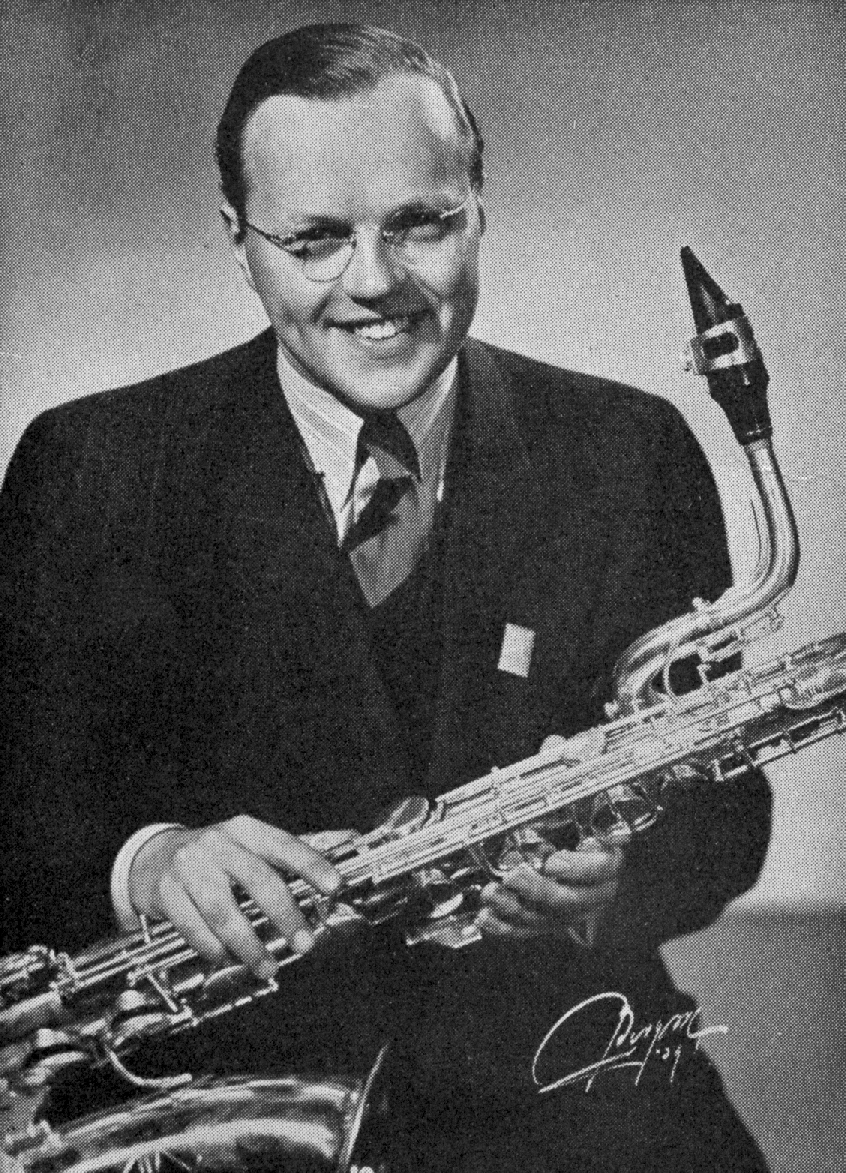

Carl Gustaf Mauritz Nilsson, known professionally as Charles Redland (July 7, 1911 – August 18, 1994) was a Swedish jazz saxophonist, bandleader, and composer.

Born in Södertälje, the son of a musician, Redland learned several instruments when he was young. In the 1930s he was a member of bands in which he played alto saxophone, clarinet, trumpet, and trombone. During that decade he also worked as a leader. On clarinet he recorded with Benny Carter in Sweden in 1936. He composed and arranged jazz and popular music. He also composed for more than 80 films, as well as for radio and TV programs. He died in Stockholm.

== Filmography ==
- The Song to Her (1934)
- A Girl for Me (1943)
- Eaglets (1944)
- Stopp! Tänk på något annat (1944) (with others)
- The Wedding on Solö (1946)
- Carnival Evening (1948)
- Robinson in Roslagen (1948)
- The Devil and the Smalander (1949)
- Big Lasse of Delsbo (1949)
- Kalle Karlsson of Jularbo (1952)
- Ursula, the Girl from the Finnish Forests (1953)
- Dance in the Smoke (1954)
- People of the Finnish Forests (1955)
- Stage Entrance (1956)
- Seventeen Years Old (1957)
- Bill Bergson Lives Dangerously (1957)
- Blonde in Bondage (1957)
- The Jazz Boy (1958)
- A Goat in the Garden (1958)
- A Lion in Town (1959)
- Heaven and Pancake (1959)
- The Children of Bullerbyn Village (1960)
- Sten Stensson Returns (1963)
- Andersson's Kalle (1972)
- Andersson's Kalle on Top Form (1973)
