= Eaglets (1944 film) =

1944 film

- Directed by: Ivar Johansson
- Written by: Bertil Edgardh; Ella Fallenius
- Starring: Alice Babs; Lasse Dahlquist; Sten Lindgren
- Cinematography: Karl-Erik Alberts
- Edited by: Eric Nordemar
- Music by: Charles Redland; Sam Samson
- Production company: Sveafilm
- Release date: 9 October 1944
- Running time: 102 minutes
- Country: Sweden
- Language: Swedish

Eaglets (Swedish: Örnungar) is a 1944 Swedish drama film directed by Ivar Johansson and starring Alice Babs, Lasse Dahlquist and Sten Lindgren. It was shot at the Centrumateljéerna Studios in Stockholm. The film's sets were designed by the art director Bertil Duroj.

== Cast ==
- Alice Babs as Marianne Hedvall
- Lasse Dahlquist as Erik Stenström
- Sten Lindgren as Tor Hedvall
- Stina Ståhle as Ester Lindeborg
- Curt Masreliez as Gunnar Gyllencrona
- Margareta Fahlén as Maj-Britt
- Kaj Hjelm as Olle Svensson
- Margaretha Bergström as Gullan Bring
- Rune Halvarsson as Fingal Svensson
- Harriett Philipson as Cecilia Käck
- Åke Hylén as Olle Fryklöf
- Julia Cæsar as Hulda
- Carl Hagman as Major
- Gunnel Wadner as Flower Girl

== Bibliography ==
- Qvist, Per Olov & von Bagh, Peter. Guide to the Cinema of Sweden and Finland. Greenwood Publishing Group, 2000.
