= Ocean Breakers =

1935 film

- Directed by: Ivar Johansson
- Written by: Per Vedin (novel); Henning Ohlson; Ivar Johansson
- Starring: Ingrid Bergman; Sten Lindgren; Tore Svennberg
- Cinematography: Julius Jaenzon
- Edited by: Ivar Johansson
- Music by: Eric Bengtson; Yngve Sköld
- Production company: Svensk Filmindustri
- Release date: 17 February 1935
- Running time: 70 minutes
- Country: Sweden
- Language: Swedish

Ocean Breakers (Swedish: Bränningar) is a 1935 Swedish drama film directed by Ivar Johansson and starring Ingrid Bergman, Sten Lindgren and Tore Svennberg. The film's sets were designed by the art director Arne Åkermark. It is also known by the alternative title The Surf.

== Cast ==
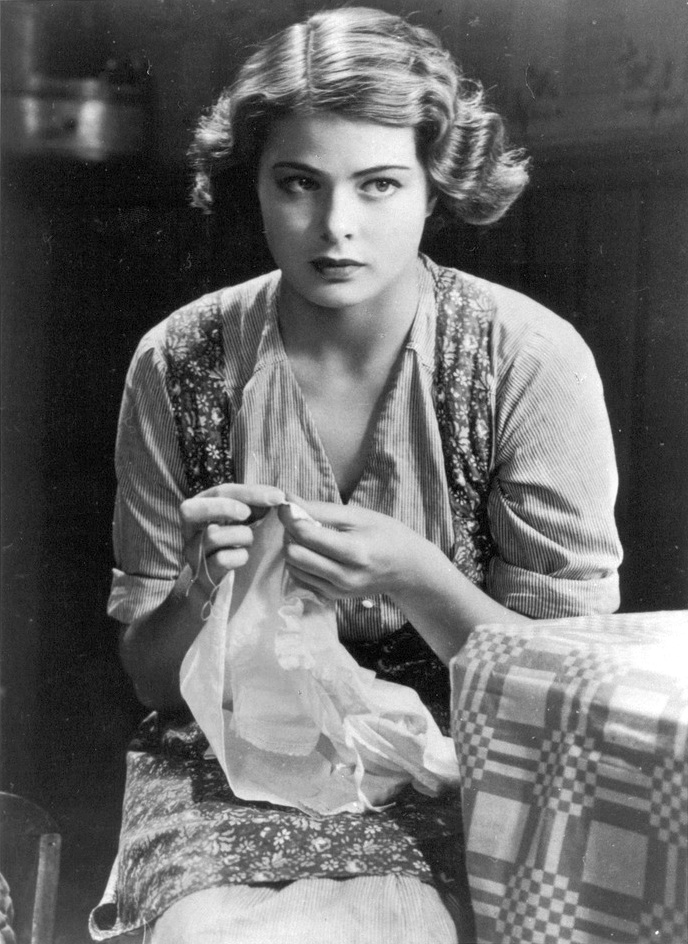
Ingrid Bergman in Ocean Breakers (Bränningar)

- Ingrid Bergman as Karin Ingman
- Sten Lindgren as Daniel Nordeman
- Tore Svennberg as Anders Nordeman
- Bror Olsson as Reverend
- Carl Ström as Lars Ingman, Karin's father
- Weyler Hildebrand as Per
- Knut Frankman as Mr. Strömblom
- Carin Swensson as Brita Strömblom
- Georg Skarstedt as Olle
- Henning Ohlsson as Karl-Johan
- Wiktor Andersson as Barker at amusement park
- Carl Browallius as Professor
- Sven-Eric Gamble as Boy who fights Stig
- Olle Granberg as Stig Ingman
- Vera Lindby as Hilma
- Holger Löwenadler as Doctor
- Erik Rosén as Head Physician

== Bibliography ==
- Chandler, Charlotte. Ingrid: Ingrid Bergman, A Personal Biography. Simon and Schuster, 2007.
