= In Lilac Time =

1952 film

- Directed by: Ivar Johansson
- Written by: Ragnar Arvedson
- Based on: Johannes och Trubbnos by Harald Beijer
- Produced by: Rune Waldekranz
- Starring: Kenne Fant; Nine-Christine Jönsson; Gudrun Brost
- Cinematography: Sven Nykvist
- Edited by: Carl-Olov Skeppstedt
- Music by: Håkan von Eichwald
- Production company: Sandrews
- Distributed by: Sandrew-Baumanfilm
- Release date: 4 February 1952
- Running time: 115 minutes
- Country: Sweden
- Language: Swedish

In Lilac Time (Swedish: När syrenerna blomma) is a 1952 Swedish historical drama film directed by Ivar Johansson and starring Kenne Fant, Nine-Christine Jönsson and Gudrun Brost. It was shot at the Centrumateljéerna Studios in Stockholm. The film's sets were designed by the art director P.A. Lundgren.

== Synopsis ==
In the late nineteenth century Johannes, a Stockholm boy is left by his middle-class parents and brought up in the countryside where he struggles to settle in. The unrelenting hostility is only softened by the kind Charlotta. When he is twenty he returns to the capital city and enlists in the Royal Guards and meets up with Charlotta again.

== Cast ==
- Kenne Fant as Johannes Weijner
- Nine-Christine Jönsson as Charlotta aka Trubbnos
- Gudrun Brost as Alexandra Weijner
- Eva Stiberg as Frida
- Maj-Lis Lüning as Julia
- Åke Fridell as Doctor
- John Elfström as Gustafson
- Anna-Lisa Baude as Emma
- Ingrid Backlin as Aina Wickman
- Börje Mellvig as Wickman
- Hjördis Petterson as Mrs. Lamberg, 'Bläsan'
- Willy Peters a John Weijner
- Björn Berglund as Rudolf
- Lissi Alandh as Lena i Härsikeby
- Sten Lindgren as August Åhlund
- Hugo Björne as King Oscar II
- Olav Riégo as General Sven Lagerberg
- Arthur Fischer as Cobbler Strid

== Bibliography ==
- Qvist, Per Olov & von Bagh, Peter. Guide to the Cinema of Sweden and Finland. Greenwood Publishing Group, 2000.
