= Bengt Logardt =

Swedish actor (1914–1994)

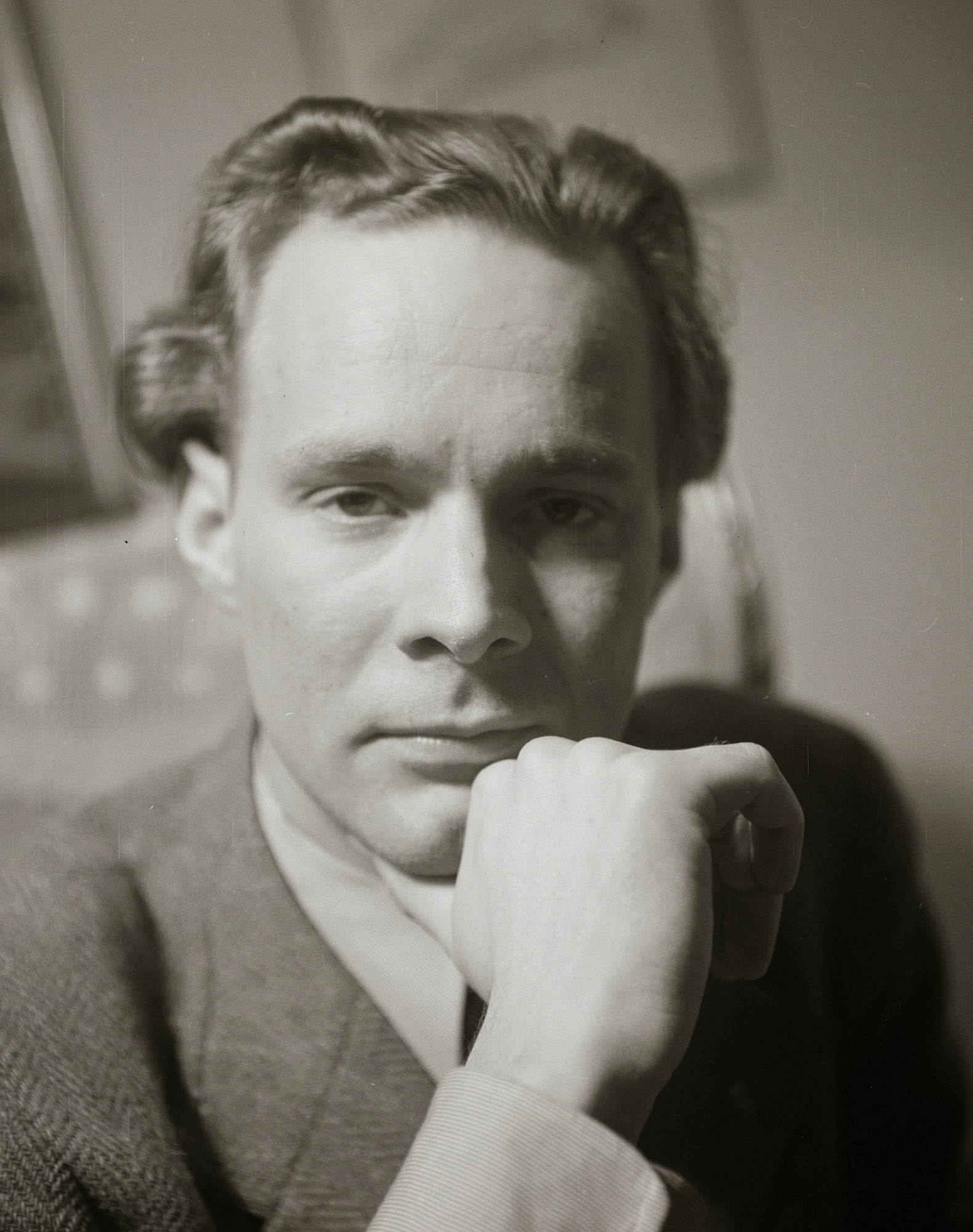
- Born: 9 October 1914; Skellefteå, Sweden
- Died: 25 September 1994 (aged 79)
- Occupations: Actor, screenwriter, film director
- Years active: 1941-1956

Bengt Logardt (9 October 1914 – 25 September 1994) was a Swedish actor, screenwriter and film director. He appeared in more than 30 films between 1941 and 1959.

== Selected filmography ==
- How to Tame a Real Man (1941)
- Take Care of Ulla (1942)
- Captured by a Voice (1943)
- Incorrigible (1946)
- Song of Stockholm (1947)
- Life in the Finnish Woods (1947)
- Music in Darkness (1948)
- The Devil and the Smalander (1949)
- Kvinnan bakom allt (1951)
- Count Svensson (1951)
- Stronger Than the Law (1951)
- A Night in the Archipelago (1953)
- Unmarried Mothers (1953)
- A Night at Glimmingehus (1954)
- Laughing in the Sunshine (1956)
- My Passionate Longing (1956)
