= The Road to Klockrike =

1953 film

- Directed by: Gunnar Skoglund
- Written by: Gunnar Skoglund; Harry Martinson
- Based on: The Road to Klockrike by Harry Martinson
- Produced by: Rune Waldekranz
- Starring: Anders Ek; Edvin Adolphson; Annika Tretow
- Cinematography: Sven Nykvist
- Edited by: Gunnar Skoglund
- Music by: Lille Bror Söderlundh
- Production company: Sandrews
- Distributed by: Sandrew-Baumanfilm
- Release date: 20 July 1953
- Running time: 102 minutes
- Country: Sweden
- Language: Swedish

The Road to Klockrike (Swedish: Vägen till Klockrike) is a 1953 Swedish drama film directed by Gunnar Skoglund and starring Anders Ek, Edvin Adolphson and Annika Tretow.

It was shot at the Centrumateljéerna Studios in Stockholm. The film's sets were designed by the art director Bibi Lindström. It is based on the 1948 novel The Road to Klockrike by Harry Martinson.

== Cast ==
- Anders Ek as Bolle
- Edvin Adolphson as Rat trap maker
- Annika Tretow as Margot
- Margit Carlqvist as Inga
- Erik Strandmark as Hällman
- Naima Wifstrand as Waterhead's Mother
- Åke Claesson as Waterhead's Father
- Anders Henrikson as Vägdamm, tramp
- Stig Järrel as Axne, vagabonde
- Gösta Cederlund as Chief of police
- Kolbjörn Knudsen as Inga's father
- Else-Marie Brandt as Emelie
- Hedvig Lindby as Lady
- Eva Wikman as Country Girl
- Elsa Prawitz as Dolly
- Gunnar Olsson as Ahlbom, cigar maker
- Olav Riégo as Quarry manager
- John Melin as 'Skötsamma Grisen'
- Tom Walter as Vagabonde stealing watches
- Per-Axel Arosenius as Dollys vän på Amerikabåten
- Svea Holst as Kvarvarande kvinna i hamnen
- Uno Larsson as Luffe på landsfiskalskontoret
- Ulf Johansson as Kvarvarande arbetslös svensk
- Karin Miller as Skrämd flicka på väg
- Birger Sahlberg as Hamnvakt
- Kenne Fant as Cagliostro
- Tor Borong as Riding Police
- Göthe Grefbo as Emigrant
- Gösta Holmström as Policeman
- Birger Lensander as Police Assistant at the Port
- Harry Martinson as Prisoner in Quarry
- Rune Stylander as Guard at the Quarry
- Emy Storm as Flicka i blomsterhagen
- Tor Isedal as Dancer at the Road Crossing
- Gunnel Wadner as Dancer at the Road Crossing
- Mille Schmidt as Dancer at the Road Crossing
- Stig Johanson as Dancer at the Road Crossing
- Palle Granditsky as Dancer at the Road Crossing

== Bibliography ==
- Qvist, Per Olov & von Bagh, Peter. Guide to the Cinema of Sweden and Finland. Greenwood Publishing Group, 2000.
