= People of the Finnish Forests =

1955 film

- Directed by: Ivar Johansson
- Written by: Birgitta Johansson; Ivar Johansson
- Based on: Finnpastorn by Jol Strand
- Starring: Birger Malmsten; Kerstin Wibom; Adolf Jahr
- Cinematography: Rune Ericson
- Edited by: Carl-Olov Skeppstedt
- Music by: Charles Redland
- Production company: Sandrews
- Distributed by: Sandrew-Baumanfilm
- Release date: 8 October 1955
- Running time: 86 minutes
- Country: Sweden
- Language: Swedish

People of the Finnish Forests (Swedish: Finnskogens folk) is a 1955 Swedish period drama film directed by Ivar Johansson and starring Birger Malmsten, Kerstin Wibom and Adolf Jahr. It was shot at the Centrumateljéerna Studios in Stockholm. The film's sets were designed by the art director Nils Nilsson.

== Synopsis ==
At the beginning of the twentieth century, a new pastor arrives in an area near the Fryken lakes inhabited traditional by Forest Finns. He attempts to lead a religious revival in the region.

== Cast ==
- Birger Malmsten as David Amberg
- Kerstin Wibom as Marit
- Adolf Jahr as Skomakar-Jöns Bengtsson
- John Elfström as Kron-Johan
- Eivor Landström as Olga Lundell
- Olle Gillgren as Klas
- Margareta Nisborg as Britta
- Rune Stylander as Sverre
- Helga Brofeldt as Böret Hindriksson
- Åke Claesson as Doctor Remberg
- Birger Lensander as Peasant giving David a ride
- Olof Thunberg as Even

== Bibliography ==
- Qvist, Per Olov & von Bagh, Peter. Guide to the Cinema of Sweden and Finland. Greenwood Publishing Group, 2000.
