= Jack of Hearts (1950 film) =

1950 film

- Directed by: Hasse Ekman
- Written by: Hasse Ekman; Lasse Swärd
- Based on: Världen utan nåd by Sven Stolpe
- Starring: Hasse Ekman; Hans Strååt; Margareta Fahlén; Eva Dahlbeck
- Cinematography: Hilding Bladh
- Edited by: Lennart Wallén
- Music by: Håkan von Eichwald
- Production company: Hasse Ekman Film
- Distributed by: Sandrew-Bauman Film
- Release date: 18 September 1950
- Running time: 84 minutes
- Country: Sweden
- Language: Swedish

Jack of Hearts (Swedish: Hjärter Knekt) is a 1950 Swedish drama film directed by Hasse Ekman and starring Ekman, Hans Strååt, Margareta Fahlén and Eva Dahlbeck. It was shot at the Centrumateljéerna Studios in Stockholm and on location around the city. The film's sets were designed by the art director Bibi Lindström.

== Plot summary ==
Lieutenant Anders Canitz only interests in life are women and horses. He lives on inherited money and has spent all of it. When he finds out that his brother leaves home for a while to meet with an old flame of his, Anders seduces his brothers wife. He breaks hearts, ruin other peoples relationships, lies and cheats with no regrets, or has he?

== Cast ==
- Hasse Ekman as Anders Canitz, Lieutenant
- Margareta Fahlén as Elsa Canitz, his sister-in law
- Hans Strååt as Wilhelm Canitz, Anders brother
- Eva Dahlbeck as Gun Lovén, writer
- Holger Löwenadler as Krister Bergencreutz
- Gertrud Fridh as Charlotta Ulfhammar, Kristers fiancée
- Åke Fridell as Berra
- Dagmar Ebbesen as Kristina Lundgren, Anders housekeeper
- Hjördis Petterson as Elisabeth Canitz, Anders and Wilhelms sister
- Ingrid Thulin as Gunvor Ranterud
- Tord Stål as Director Benzel
- Sif Ruud as Prostitute
- Yvonne Lombard as Margareta Lieven
- Margit Andelius as fröken Appellöf, Secretary
- Signe Wirff as Mrs. Hallgren
- Barbro Larsson as Girl in the grass
- Börje Mellvig as Car Driver
- Fylgia Zadig as Woman in Car
- Georg Fernqvist as Karlsson
- Gabriel Rosén as Jönsson
- Nils Hultgren as Wahlberg
- Margot Lindén as Ingrid

== Bibliography ==
- Gustafsson, Fredrik. The Man from the Third Row: Hasse Ekman, Swedish Cinema and the Long Shadow of Ingmar Bergman. Berghahn Books, 2016.
