= Storm Over the Skerries =

1938 film

- Directed by: Ivar Johansson
- Written by: Albert Engström; Ivar Johansson
- Starring: Sten Lindgren; Karin Ekelund; Björn Berglund
- Cinematography: Olle Ekman
- Edited by: Emil A. Lingheim
- Music by: Erik Baumann
- Production company: Europa Film
- Distributed by: Europa Film
- Release date: 21 March 1938
- Running time: 98 minutes
- Country: Sweden
- Language: Swedish

Storm Over the Skerries (Swedish: Storm över skären) is a 1938 Swedish drama film directed by Ivar Johansson and starring Sten Lindgren, Karin Ekelund and Björn Berglund. It was shot at the Sundbyberg Studios of Europa Film in Stockholm and on location around Rödlöga and the island of Örskär. The film's sets were designed by the art director Max Linder.

== Synopsis ==
Two local men, one of them a fisherman, quarrel over a beautiful woman who lives on their island.

== Cast ==
- Sten Lindgren as Alfred Österman
- Karin Ekelund as Sonja Söderman
- Björn Berglund as Sven Vågman
- Arthur Fischer as Albert Engström
- Hjalmar Peters as Österberg
- Edla Rothgardt as Mrs. Österberg
- Tom Walter as Kalle Sjölund
- Vera Lund as Fia Sjölund
- Emil Fjellström as Vestergren
- Millan Fjellström as Mrs. Vestergren
- Harry Brandelius as Singing sailor
- Albin Erlandzon as School teacher
- Aurore Palmgren as Gossip
- Ruth Weijden as Gossip
- Georg Skarstedt as Karlsson
- Bertil Berglund as A Man from Roslagen
- Helge Karlsson as A Man from Roslagen
- John Norrman as A Man from Roslagen

== Bibliography ==
- Qvist, Per Olov & von Bagh, Peter. Guide to the Cinema of Sweden and Finland. Greenwood Publishing Group, 2000.
