= People of Hälsingland =

1933 film

- Directed by: Ivar Johansson
- Written by: Henning Ohlson (play); Ivar Johansson
- Starring: Hilda Castegren; Sven Bergvall; Sten Lindgren
- Cinematography: Elner Åkesson
- Edited by: Rolf Husberg
- Music by: Eric Bengtson
- Production company: Svensk Talfilm
- Distributed by: Svensk Talfilm
- Release date: 13 November 1933
- Running time: 83 minutes
- Country: Sweden
- Language: Swedish

People of Hälsingland (Swedish: Hälsingar) is a 1933 Swedish drama film directed by Ivar Johansson and starring Hilda Castegren, Sven Bergvall and Sten Lindgren. It was shot at the Råsunda Studios in Stockholm. The film's sets were designed by the art director Arne Åkermark. It was remade as the 1940 Finnish film In the Fields of Dreams.

== Cast ==
- Hilda Castegren as Mother Övergård
- Sven Bergvall as Olof
- Sten Lindgren as Jonas
- Inga Tidblad as Birgit Ljusnar
- Frank Sundström as Gudmund
- Henning Ohlsson as Per-Erik
- Karin Ekelund as Lisa-Lena
- Edit Ernholm as Brita
- Kaj Aspegren as Maja-Stina
- Emmy Albiin as Gammel-Kersti
- Hugo Björne as Komministern i Dalbo
- Tor Borong as Gammel-August
- Carl Deurell as Fängelsedirektören
- John Elfström as Dräng i slagsmål
- Gösta Ericsson as Niko
- Knut Frankman as Karlsson
- Karin Granberg as Kvinna på dansbanan
- Carl Harald as Vaktmästare
- Bror Olsson as Domaren i tingsrätten
- Aurore Palmgren as Åhörare i tingssalen
- Hjalmar Peters as Patron på Näsvik
- Albert Ståhl as Kamrer
- Hugo Tranberg as Åklagare

== Bibliography ==
- Qvist, Per Olov & von Bagh, Peter. Guide to the Cinema of Sweden and Finland. Greenwood Publishing Group, 2000.
- Sundholm, John. Historical Dictionary of Scandinavian Cinema. Scarecrow Press, 2012.
