= Albert & Herbert =

Swedish TV sitcom (1974–1982)

- Genre: Comedy
- Based on: Steptoe and Son by Ray Galton and Alan Simpsons
- Written by: Bo Hermansson
- Directed by: Bo Hermansson
- Starring: Sten-Åke Cederhök; Tomas von Brömssen
- Country of origin: Sweden
- Original language: Swedish

Original release
- Network: SVT
- Release: 1974 – 1982

Albert & Herbert was a Swedish comedy series that ran in 1974, 1976–1979, and 1981–82, in addition to an advent series and a theatre play titled Mordet på Skolgatan 15. It had a spin-off series in 1995. Albert & Herbert, which featured father-and-son scrap dealers living together, was an adaptation of Ray Galton and Alan Simpsons's BBC series Steptoe and Son from the 1960s and 1970s.

Albert was played by Sten-Åke Cederhök, and the son Herbert was played by Tomas von Brömssen. During the first six episodes, Herbert was played by Lennart Lundh. The characters lived in a dilapidated wooden house in Skolgatan 15, in Haga, Gothenburg.
