= The Lady Becomes a Maid =

1936 film

- Directed by: Ivar Johansson
- Written by: Gunnar Widegren (novel); Ivar Johansson
- Starring: Hugo Björne; Olga Andersson; Marianne Löfgren
- Cinematography: Ernst Westerberg
- Edited by: Ivar Johansson
- Music by: Sune Waldimir
- Production company: Sveriges Biografägares Distributionsbyrå
- Distributed by: Sveriges Biografägares Distributionsbyrå
- Release date: 2 November 1936
- Running time: 96 minutes
- Country: Sweden
- Language: Swedish

The Lady Becomes a Maid (Swedish: Fröken blir piga) is a 1936 Swedish comedy film directed by Ivar Johansson and starring Hugo Björne, Olga Andersson and Marianne Löfgren.

The film is based on the 1933 novel Under falsk flagg by Gunnar Widegren.

== Cast ==
- Hugo Björne as Rosengren
- Olga Andersson as Mrs. Rosengren
- Marianne Löfgren as Alva Rosengren
- Ernst Eklund as Karl-Axel Allard
- Erik Rosén as Algot Allard
- Hjördis Petterson as Laura Allard
- Carin Swensson as Hildegard, maid
- Sten Lindgren as Arthur Lundquist
- Kotti Chave as Svante Hedelius
- Holger Löwenadler as Johan
- Tom Walter as Alfred
- Sven Arvor as Maja's brother
- Knut Frankman as Church warden
- Nils Hallberg as Kalle
- Gerd Mårtensson as Girl at the dance
- Siri Olson as Maid
- Aurore Palmgren as Party guest

== Bibliography ==
- Qvist, Per Olov & von Bagh, Peter. Guide to the Cinema of Sweden and Finland. Greenwood Publishing Group, 2000.
