= The Old Clock at Ronneberga =

1944 film

- Directed by: Gunnar Skoglund
- Written by: Hertha Odeman (play); Herbert Grevenius; Gunnar Skoglund
- Starring: Lauritz Falk; Vibeke Falk; Hilda Borgström
- Cinematography: Martin Bodin
- Edited by: Gunnar Skoglund
- Music by: Sven Sköld
- Production company: Svensk Filmindustri
- Distributed by: Svensk Filmindustri
- Release date: 13 March 1944
- Running time: 90 minutes
- Country: Sweden
- Language: Swedish

The Old Clock at Ronneberga (Swedish: Klockan på Rönneberga) is a 1944 Swedish drama film directed and co-written by Gunnar Skoglund and starring Lauritz Falk, Vibeke Falk and Hilda Borgström. It was shot at the Filmstaden in Råsunda, in Stockholm. The film's sets were designed by the art director Nils Svenwall.

== Cast ==
- Signhild Björkman as Narrator
- Lauritz Falk as Lennart Heijken
- Vibeke Falk as Viveka Langenfeldt
- Sten Sture Modéen as Gunnar Heijken
- Gun Robertson as Eva Heijken
- Monica Tropp as Vivan
- Sten Lindgren as Brolin
- Jullan Kindahl as Madame Hallström
- Hilda Borgström as Sara
- Oscar Ljung as Henrik Heijken
- Hartwig Fock as Jerker Boman
- Birgit Chenon as Elisabet Heijken
- Gunnar Olsson as Clock salesman
- Glann Gustafsson as Marianne, Lennart's sister
- Lil Germudson as Ebba, Lennart's sister
- Signe Enwall as Sofi
- Nils Dahlgren as Major
- Erik Hell as Lieutenant Gerhard Grijp
- Kotti Chave as Lieutenant Bergencrona
- Gustaf Hiort af Ornäs as Lieutenant Malm
- Ivar Kåge as Colonel
- Åke Jensen as Lieutenant Birger Langenfeldt
- Gerda Björne as Mayor's wife
- Wiktor Andersson as Lindgren, groom
- Barbro Fleege as Mally
- Kerstin Holmberg as Beate
- Gabriel Rosén as Baron at the mayor's party
- Åke Fridell as Legal clerk at the mayor's party
- Gösta Gustafson as Ko-Johan Johansson
- Helge Hagerman s Lindström
- Carl Ström as Forsberg, forester
- Anders Frithiof as Banker
- Rolf Gregor as Karlsson, stablehand
- Henry Lundqvist as Johan
- Viveka Magnét as Maja
- Erik Sundqvist as Erik, Johan's rival
- Lasse Krantz as August Johansson

== Bibliography ==
- Qvist, Per Olov & von Bagh, Peter. Guide to the Cinema of Sweden and Finland. Greenwood Publishing Group, 2000.
