= Take Care of Ulla =

1942 film

- Directed by: Ivar Johansson
- Written by: Ebba Richert (novel); Ivar Johansson
- Starring: Marianne Aminoff; Bengt Logardt; Åke Grönberg
- Cinematography: Ernst Westerberg
- Edited by: Ivar Johansson
- Music by: Ernfrid Ahlin
- Production company: Film AB Lux
- Distributed by: Film AB Lux
- Release date: 27 October 1942
- Running time: 111 minutes
- Country: Sweden
- Language: Swedish

Take Care of Ulla (Swedish: Ta hand om Ulla) is a 1942 Swedish drama film directed by Ivar Johansson and starring Marianne Aminoff, Bengt Logardt and Åke Grönberg. The film's sets were designed by the art director Bertil Duroj.

== Main cast ==
- Marianne Aminoff as Ulla Lundin
- Bengt Logardt as Gunnar Bergendahl
- Åke Grönberg as Bigge Berglund
- Claes Thelander as Göran Hessler
- Nils Lundell as Lundgren
- Vera Lindby as Sonja
- Greta Liming as Gun Larsson

== Bibliography ==
- Qvist, Per Olov & von Bagh, Peter. Guide to the Cinema of Sweden and Finland. Greenwood Publishing Group, 2000.
