= Nine-Christine Jönsson =

Swedish actress (1926–2011)

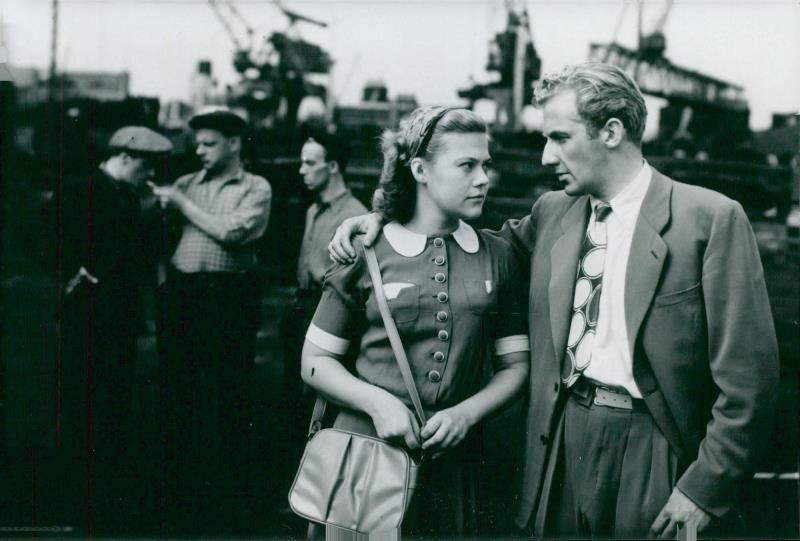
- Jönsson in Port of Call (1948)
- Born: 8 June 1926; Stockholm, Sweden
- Died: 3 January 2011 (aged 84)
- Occupation: Actress
- Years active: 1946–1952

Nine-Christine Jönsson (8 June 1926 – 3 January 2011) was a Swedish film actress. She appeared in seven films between 1946 and 1952.

== Filmography ==
- Ödemarksprästen (1946)
- Life in the Finnish Woods (1947)
- The Poetry of Ådalen (1947)
- Lars Hård (1948)
- Port of Call (1948)
- The Realm of the Rye (1950)
- In Lilac Time (1952)
