= Stronger Than the Law =

1951 film

- Directed by: Bengt Logardt; Arnold Sjöstrand
- Written by: Bernhard Nordh
- Based on: Stronger Than the Law by Bernhard Nordh
- Starring: Margareta Fahlén; Bengt Logardt; Margit Carlqvist
- Cinematography: Rune Ericson
- Edited by: Lennart Wallén
- Music by: Sven Sköld
- Production company: Sandrews
- Distributed by: Sandrew-Baumanfilm
- Release date: 15 October 1951
- Running time: 96 minutes
- Country: Sweden
- Language: Swedish

Stronger Than the Law (Swedish: Starkare än lagen) is a 1951 Swedish historical drama film directed by Bengt Logardt and Arnold Sjöstrand and starring Margareta Fahlén, Bengt Logardt and Margit Carlqvist. It was shot at the Centrumateljéerna Studios in Stockholm. The film's sets were designed by the art director P.A. Lundgren.

== Synopsis ==
The film is set in the 1870s in a remote community in the mountains of Northern Sweden. A strange man from the south arrives, and interacts with the strait-laced Anna and the bubbly Mimmi who openly flouts convention. Eventually it turns out that he has killed a man and is on the run.

== Cast ==
- Margareta Fahlén as Anna Persson
- Bengt Logardt as Helge Andersson
- Margit Carlqvist as Mimmi
- Arnold Sjöstrand as Anders Olsson
- Eva Stiberg Stina
- Sven Magnusson as Per
- Peter Lindgren as Manuel
- Yvonne Lombard as Elvira
- Åke Fridell as Mattias
- Sten Lindgren as Parish constable
- Eric Laurent as Johan Persson
- Albert Ståhl as Ola
- Georg Skarstedt as Priest
- Edel Stenberg as Mme Petersen
- Alf Östlund as Stenerud

== Bibliography ==
- Wright, Rochelle. The Visible Wall: Jews and Other Ethnic Outsiders in Swedish Film. SIU Press, 1998.
