= Sten Lindgren =

Swedish actor

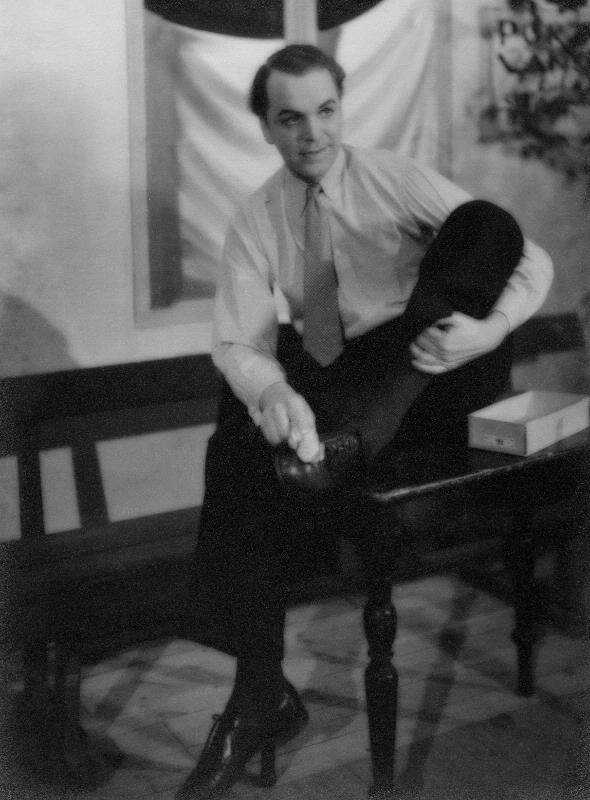
- Born: Sten Peter Gustaf Adolf Lindgren; 23 June 1903; Munkfors, Sweden
- Died: 13 May 1959 (aged 55); Stockholm, Sweden
- Occupation: Actor
- Years active: 1925 - 1958 (film)

Sten Lindgren (22 June 1903 – 13 May 1959) was a Swedish film actor. He made his debut in the 1925 silent historical film Charles XII.

== Selected filmography ==
- Charles XII (1925)
- Ingmar's Inheritance (1925)
- People of Hälsingland (1933)
- Ocean Breakers (1935)
- The Boys of Number Fifty Seven (1935)
- The Lady Becomes a Maid (1936)
- The People of Bergslagen (1937)
- Storm Over the Skerries (1938)
- For Better, for Worse (1938)
- Life Goes On (1941)
- The Train Leaves at Nine (1941)
- The Yellow Clinic (1942)
- Captured by a Voice (1943)
- Young Blood (1943)
- The Old Clock at Ronneberga (1944)
- Eaglets (1944)
- The Forest Is Our Heritage (1944)
- The Emperor of Portugallia (1944)
- Motherhood (1945)
- Sunshine Follows Rain (1946)
- The Wedding on Solö (1946)
- Dynamite (1947)
- The Poetry of Ådalen (1947)
- The Girl from the Marsh Croft (1947)
- Lars Hård (1948)
- The Devil and the Smalander (1949)
- Bohus Battalion (1949)
- Big Lasse of Delsbo (1949)
- The Realm of the Rye (1950)
- Valley of Eagles (1951)
- Stronger Than the Law (1951)
- In Lilac Time (1952)
- Ursula, the Girl from the Finnish Forests (1953)
- A Goat in the Garden (1958)
- Fridolf Stands Up! (1958)

== Bibliography ==
- Chandler, Charlotte. Ingrid: Ingrid Bergman, A Personal Biography. Simon and Schuster, 2007.
