= Captured by a Voice =

1943 film

- Directed by: Ivar Johansson
- Written by: Eva Liewen; Ivar Johansson
- Starring: Rut Holm; Åke Grönberg; Bengt Logardt
- Cinematography: Ernst Westerberg
- Edited by: Ivar Johansson
- Music by: Ernfrid Ahlin
- Production company: Film AB Lux
- Distributed by: Film AB Lux
- Release date: 4 May 1943
- Running time: 99 minutes
- Country: Sweden
- Language: Swedish

Captured by a Voice (Swedish: Fångad av en röst) is a 1943 Swedish comedy film directed by Ivar Johansson and starring Rut Holm, Åke Grönberg and Bengt Logardt. The film's sets were designed by the art director Bertil Duroj.

== Cast ==
- Rut Holm as Concordia Blomkvist
- Åke Grönberg as Nicke Blom
- Marianne Inger as Britt Linde
- Bengt Logardt as Dick Grabe
- Nils Lundell as Peter Torberg
- Artur Rolén as Flodell
- Carl Hagman as Jansson
- Gerd Mårtensson as Karin Hall
- Sten Lindgren as Justus Larsson
- Linnéa Hillberg as Mrs. Grabe
- Anna-Lisa Baude as Mrs. Möller
- Henrik Schildt as Nils Ferlin
- Georg Skarstedt as Lindgren
- Gunnel Wadner as Maid

== Bibliography ==
- Qvist, Per Olov & von Bagh, Peter. Guide to the Cinema of Sweden and Finland. Greenwood Publishing Group, 2000.
