= Crime in the Sun =

1947 film

- Directed by: Göran Gentele
- Written by: Louise Forsell; Göran Gentele; Staffan Tjerneld
- Produced by: Lorens Marmstedt
- Starring: Birger Malmsten; Gunnel Broström; Margareta Fahlén
- Cinematography: Sten Dahlgren
- Edited by: Tage Holmberg
- Music by: Willy Mattes
- Production company: Terrafilm
- Distributed by: Terrafilm
- Release date: 20 December 1947
- Running time: 88 minutes
- Country: Sweden
- Language: Swedish

Crime in the Sun (Swedish: Brott i sol) is a 1947 Swedish crime drama film directed by Göran Gentele and starring Birger Malmsten, Gunnel Broström and Margareta Fahlén. The film's sets were designed by the art director Nils Nilsson. Location shooting took place on the island of Värmdö.

== Synopsis ==
Harry returns home after spending six years in a mental asylum. Gradually he recalls the events that lead one of his friends to commit murderer, and he now invites them back to the house in order to uncover which is the killer.

== Cast ==
- Birger Malmsten as Harry
- Gunnel Broström as Marguerite
- Margareta Fahlén as Eva
- Ulf Palme as Rickard
- Curt Masreliez as Raoul
- Jan Molander as Georg
- Yngve Nordwall as Doktor Bergquist
- Wiktor Andersson as Trädgårdsmästaren
- Elsa Ebbesen as Stina
- Ernst Brunman as Customer in Furniture Shop
- Agda Helin as Wife of Customer in Furniture Shop
- Gull Natorp as Cleaning Lady

== Bibliography ==
- Qvist, Per Olov & von Bagh, Peter. Guide to the Cinema of Sweden and Finland. Greenwood Publishing Group, 2000.
