= The Wedding on Solö =

1946 film

- Directed by: Ivar Johansson
- Written by: Oscar Wennersten (play); Erik Lundegård; Ivar Johansson
- Produced by: Carl Nelson
- Starring: Adolf Jahr; Rut Holm; Sigbrit Molin
- Cinematography: Erik Blomberg
- Edited by: Ragnar Engström
- Music by: Charles Redland
- Production company: Monark Film
- Release date: 21 September 1946
- Running time: 98 minutes
- Country: Sweden
- Language: Swedish

The Wedding on Solö (Swedish: Bröllopet på Solö) is a 1946 Swedish comedy film directed by Ivar Johansson and starring Adolf Jahr, Rut Holm and Sigbrit Molin. It was shot at the Centrumateljéerna Studios in Stockholm. The film's sets were designed by the art director Arthur Spjuth. Inspired by a 1915 play of the same title by Oscar Wennersten, it is a sequel to the 1945 film The Österman Brother's Virago.

== Cast ==
- Adolf Jahr as Kalle Österman
- Rut Holm as Agneta Österman
- Sigbrit Molin as Ella
- Sven Magnusson as Torsten
- Emy Hagman as Anna
- Lasse Krantz as Anders
- John Elfström as Anton Andersson
- Ingemar Holde as Isak
- Sten Lindgren as Vicar Bång
- Birger Åsander as County Police
- Carl Reinholdz as Sjöberg
- Anna Olin as Cook

== Bibliography ==
- Qvist, Per Olov & von Bagh, Peter. Guide to the Cinema of Sweden and Finland. Greenwood Publishing Group, 2000.
