= The White Reindeer =

1952 film

- Original Finnish poster
- Directed by: Erik Blomberg
- Written by: Erik Blomberg; Mirjami Kuosmanen
- Produced by: Aarne Tarkas
- Starring: Mirjami Kuosmanen; Kalervo Nissilä; Åke Lindman; Arvo Lehesmaa
- Cinematography: Erik Blomberg
- Edited by: Erik Blomberg
- Music by: Einar Englund
- Production company: Junior-Film
- Distributed by: Adams Filmi; Suomi-Filmi
- Release date: 25 July 1952
- Running time: 74 minutes (1952); 68 minutes (1986 restoration)
- Country: Finland
- Language: Finnish
- Budget: €7,600,000

The White Reindeer (Finnish: Valkoinen peura, Swedish: Den Vita Renen) is a 1952 Finnish folk horror film directed by Erik Blomberg in his feature film debut.

Blomberg wrote the screenplay with his wife Mirjami Kuosmanen, who also stars in the lead role. Based on pre-Christian Finnish mythology and Sami shamanism, the film is set in the Finnish Lapland and centers on a young woman, Pirita (Kuosmanen).

The White Reindeer was entered in competition at the 1953 Cannes Film Festival and earned the Jean Cocteau–led jury special award for Best Fairy Tale Film. After its limited release five years later in the United States, it was one of five films to win the 1956 Golden Globe Award for Best Foreign Film.

== Plot ==
In the snowy Finnish landscape, a woman named Maarita gives birth to a daughter, whom she calls Pirita. Shortly after her birth, it is prophesized that Pirita will become a part of the traditional joik. Years later, the now adult Pirita takes part in the annual reindeer competitions. In them, she competes with a young reindeer herder, Aslak. The two quickly fall in love and are married shortly afterward. Aslak must spend time away for work, leaving his new bride lonely.

In an effort to alleviate her loneliness and ignite marital passion, Pirita goes to ask for help from the local shaman Tsalkku-Nilla, who prepares a potion and recites a spell. The shaman instructs Pirita to sacrifice the first creature she encounters to the Great Seita, a sacred reindeer graveyard, which will make any man fall in love with her. Unfortunately, the first creature she encounters is a white reindeer that Aslak has set free. Although she sacrifices the reindeer, the ritual goes awry. While she is able to attract any man, during each full moon she gains supernatural powers and transforms into a murderous white reindeer.

One night, the reindeer herders notice a mysterious white reindeer roaming the wilderness. While one of the herders, Niilan, manages to catch it while he is alone, it reverts back into Pirita, who promptly kills him. Nights pass and another herder dies in the same manner, sending the village into a panic, believing witchcraft is responsible for the deaths. Word travels and a forester soon arrives from southern Finland, brushing off the local's superstition. He later encounters the creature and is about to shoot at it, but his rifle goes off on its own. The reindeer then transforms into Pirita before the man's eyes, who runs away in terror. In the reindeer camp, he claims that Pirita is a witch.

Later, during the wedding of one of the villagers, Pirita appears to the bride and groom as the white reindeer. The groom, entranced by the creature, follows it into the wilderness and is never seen again. The incident convinces the entire village that Pirita is a witch, who arm themselves with iron spears and form a mob to hunt her down. Realizing she has been discovered, Pirita flees from the village while alternating between her human and reindeer form. She attempts to seek help from the shaman, only to find that he has been killed, forcing her to flee. Arriving at the place of sacrifice, Pirita begs for mercy from Seida to no avail, transforming back into the white reindeer once more. Before she can escape, Aslak, the first to catch up to her, plunges his spear into her. Mortally wounded, Pirita reverts into her human form, dying just as the other villagers arrive.

== Cast ==
- Mirjami Kuosmanen as Pirita and as Maarita, Pirita's mother
- Kalervo Nissilä as Aslak
- Åke Lindman as forest ranger
- Arvo Lehesmaa as Tsalkku-Nilla, shaman
- Jouni Tapiola as reindeer herder
- Tyyne Haarla as older woman (uncredited)
- Pentti Irjala as the speaker (uncredited)
- Edvin Kajanne as reindeer herder (uncredited)
- Kauko Laurikainen as man in Laplander's hut (uncredited)
- Heimo Lepistö as wealthy man (uncredited)
- Osmo Osva as reindeer herder (uncredited)
- Aarne Tarkas as the groom (uncredited)
- Inke Tarkas as the bride (uncredited)
- Evald Terho as Pirita’s father (uncredited)
- Kaarlo Wilska as reindeer herder (uncredited)

== Release ==
=== Theatrical release ===
The White Reindeer was released theatrically outside Finland in at least 11 countries, including the United States, Sweden and France.

=== Home media ===
The film was released on VHS in Finland in 1990; and in the 2010s, DVDs were released in Finland and France. A 4K restoration from the original camera negative was realized in 2016–2017 by the National Audiovisual Institute of Finland and was released on Blu-ray with Swedish and English subtitles. On 8 April 2019 Region 2 DVDs and Blu-ray discs were released by Eureka Entertainment, as a part of its "Masters of Cinema" series.

== Reception ==
=== International reception ===
The White Reindeer received mostly positive reviews from critics outside of Finland, with many praising the film's atmosphere, cinematography, and haunting imagery. J. Hoberman from The Village Voice gave the film a positive review, calling it "a quasi-ethnographic exercise in magic neorealism". Hoberman also commended the film for its "terse delivery and stark premise". Jeremy Aspinall from Radio Times rated the film four out of five stars, praising the film's documentary-style cinematography, which he felt effectively captured Finland's snow-filled landscape, haunting imagery, and Kuosmanen's performance.

Starburst Magazine's James Evans awarded The White Reindeer nine stars out of ten, calling it "a remarkable, beautiful, and compelling film that is fascinatingly rooted in Lapland mythology and Sámi practices"; highlighting the story, dream-like cinematography, and Kuosmanen's performance. Maitland McDonagh from TV Guide awarded the film 3 out of 5 stars, criticizing it for being awkward in some parts while praising the cinematography, and haunting imagery. McDonagh concluded her review by calling it "A must-see for horror completists, and one of the few films to explore Sami folkloric traditions."

=== Awards ===
- Cannes Film Festival 1953: Best fairy-tale film
- Golden Globe 1956: Best foreign-language film

== Bibliography ==
- Cowie, Peter; Buquet, Françoise; Risto, Pitkänen (1992). Scandinavian Cinema: A Survey of the Films and Film-makers of Denmark, Finland, Iceland, Norway, and Sweden. Tantivy Press. ISBN 978-0-573-69911-5.
- Senn, Bryan (6 February 2017). The Werewolf Filmography: 300+ Movies. McFarland & Company. ISBN 978-0-7864-7910-8.
- Sundholm, John; Thorsen, Isak; Lars Gustaf Andersson (20 September 2012). Historical Dictionary of Scandinavian Cinema. Scarecrow Press. ISBN 978-0-8108-7899-0.
