= Man's Woman (1945 film) =

1945 film

- Directed by: Gunnar Skoglund
- Written by: Gunnar Skoglund
- Based on: Man's Woman by Vilhelm Moberg
- Produced by: Gunnar Skoglund
- Starring: Edvin Adolphson; Birgit Tengroth; Holger Löwenadler
- Cinematography: Gösta Roosling
- Edited by: Gunnar Skoglund
- Music by: Hugo Alfvén
- Production company: Svensk Filmindustri
- Distributed by: Svensk Filmindustri
- Release date: 5 February 1945
- Running time: 88 minutes
- Country: Sweden
- Language: Swedish

Man's Woman (Swedish: Mans kvinna) is a 1945 Swedish historical drama film directed by Gunnar Skoglund and starring Edvin Adolphson, Birgit Tengroth and Holger Löwenadler. It was shot at the Råsunda Studios in Stockholm. The film's sets were designed by the art director Nils Svenwall. It is based on the 1933 novel of the same title by Vilhelm Moberg.

== Cast ==
- Edvin Adolphson as Håkan
- Birgit Tengroth as Märit
- Holger Löwenadler as Påvel
- Erik Berglund as Herman
- Gudrun Brost as Elin
- Aurore Palmgren as Karna
- Carl Deurell as Elder
- Torsten Hillberg as Constable
- Olof Krook as Man in village
- Segol Mann as Man in village
- Per-Axel Arosenius as Man in village
- Einar Söderbäck as Man in village
- Anna Olin as Woman in village
- Signe Wirff as Woman in village
- Kerstin Rabe as Woman in village
- Gun Adler as Tora
- Edla Rothgardt as Woman in village
- Gard Cederborg as Woman in village
- Fylgia Zadig as Woman in village

== Bibliography ==
- Qvist, Per Olov & von Bagh, Peter. Guide to the Cinema of Sweden and Finland. Greenwood Publishing Group, 2000.
