= Eva Stiberg =

Swedish actress

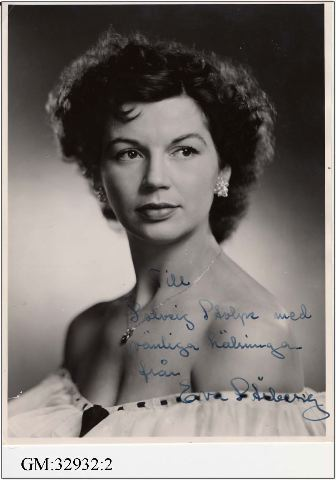
- Born: Rut Eva Nilsson; 26 December 1920; Strömsund, Sweden
- Died: 28 August 1990 (aged 69); Stockholm, Sweden
- Occupation: Actress
- Years active: 1941–1973
- Spouses: Lennart Stiberg (m. 1942–1955) Gert Ove Andersson (m. 1955–1976)

Eva Stiberg (26 December 1920 – 28 August 1990) was a Swedish stage and film actress. She is mostly famous for her role as Märta Grankvist in the Swedish TV show Vi på Saltkråkan (Life on Seacrow Island) and the films that followed, for which Astrid Lindgren wrote the script.

== Selected filmography ==
- Young Bambi (voice role; Swedish dub) - Bambi (1943)
- Count Only the Happy Moments (1944)
- Widower Jarl (1945)
- Eva (1948)
- Dangerous Spring (1949)
- Stronger Than the Law (1951)
- Farlig kurva (1952)
- In Lilac Time (1952)
- Unmarried Mothers (1953)
- Ursula, the Girl from the Finnish Forests (1953)
- Marianne (1953)
- Seger i mörker (1954)
- A Goat in the Garden (1958)
- Vi på Saltkråkan (1964)
- Tjorven, Båtsman och Moses (1964)
- Tjorven och Mysak (1966)
- Skrållan, Ruskprick och Knorrhane (1967)
- Vi på Saltkråkan (1968)
