= Carin Swensson =

Swedish actor

- Born: 28 February 1905; Gothenburg, Sweden
- Died: 14 October 1990 (aged 85)
- Occupation: Actress
- Years active: 1933–1963

Carin Swensson (28 February 1905 – 14 October 1990) was a Swedish actress. She appeared in more than 50 films between 1933 and 1963.

== Selected filmography ==
- Boman's Boy (1933)
- Under False Flag (1935)
- Ocean Breakers (1935)
- The Lady Becomes a Maid (1936)
- Unfriendly Relations (1936)
- Just a Bugler (1938)
- Mot nya tider (1939)
- Wanted (1939)
- The Crazy Family (1940)
- The Bjorck Family (1940)
- Sunny Sunberg (1941)
- How to Tame a Real Man (1941)
- Jolanta the Elusive Pig (1945)
- His Majesty Must Wait (1945)
- The Girls in Smaland (1945)
- Motherhood (1945)
- Brita in the Merchant's House (1946)
- Song of Stockholm (1947)
- Dynamite (1947)
- Each Heart Has Its Own Story (1948)
- Carnival Evening (1948)
- Bohus Battalion (1949)
- Andersson's Kalle (1950)
- My Sister and I (1950)
- The Girl from Backafall (1953)
