= The People of Bergslagen =

1937 film

- Directed by: Gunnar Olsson
- Written by: Sölve Cederstrand; Waldemar Hammenhög; Gunnar Olsson
- Starring: Karin Ekelund; Sten Lindgren; Arnold Sjöstrand
- Cinematography: Hilmer Ekdahl
- Edited by: Wic Kjellin
- Music by: Hilding Rosenberg
- Production company: Europa Film
- Distributed by: Europa Film
- Release date: 25 October 1937
- Running time: 84 minutes
- Country: Sweden
- Language: Swedish

The People of Bergslagen (Swedish: Bergslagsfolk) is a 1937 Swedish drama film directed by Gunnar Olsson and starring Karin Ekelund, Sten Lindgren and Arnold Sjöstrand. It was shot at the Sundbyberg Studios of Europa Film in Stockholm.

== Cast ==
- Karin Ekelund as Karin Löwenskiöld
- Sten Lindgren as Bertil Åkerman
- Arnold Sjöstrand as Rudolf Lunding
- Hugo Björne as Captain Håkan Löwenskiöld
- Gerda Björne as Anne-Marie Löwenskiöld
- Hjalmar Peters as Persson
- Hartwig Fock as Larsson - Mine-captain
- Frithiof Bjärne as Farmhand
- Ingrid Luterkort as Persson's Maid
- Gunnar Björnstrand as Birthday guest
- Lillie Björnstrand as Birthday guest
- Alma Bodén as Johanna
- Helga Brofeldt as Farmer's wife
- John Ericsson as Farmer
- Erik Forslund as Meeting participator
- Knut Frankman as Secretary at meeting
- Sven-Eric Gamble as Boy at merchant's shop
- Wictor Hagman as Member of the board
- Nils Johannisson as Member of the Mine-board
- Börje Mellvig as Birthday guest
- Erik Rosén as Member of the Mine-board
- Ulla Wikander as Birthday guest

== Bibliography ==
- Qvist, Per Olov & von Bagh, Peter. Guide to the Cinema of Sweden and Finland. Greenwood Publishing Group, 2000.
