= Ivar Johansson (director) =

Swedish film director and writer (1889–1963)

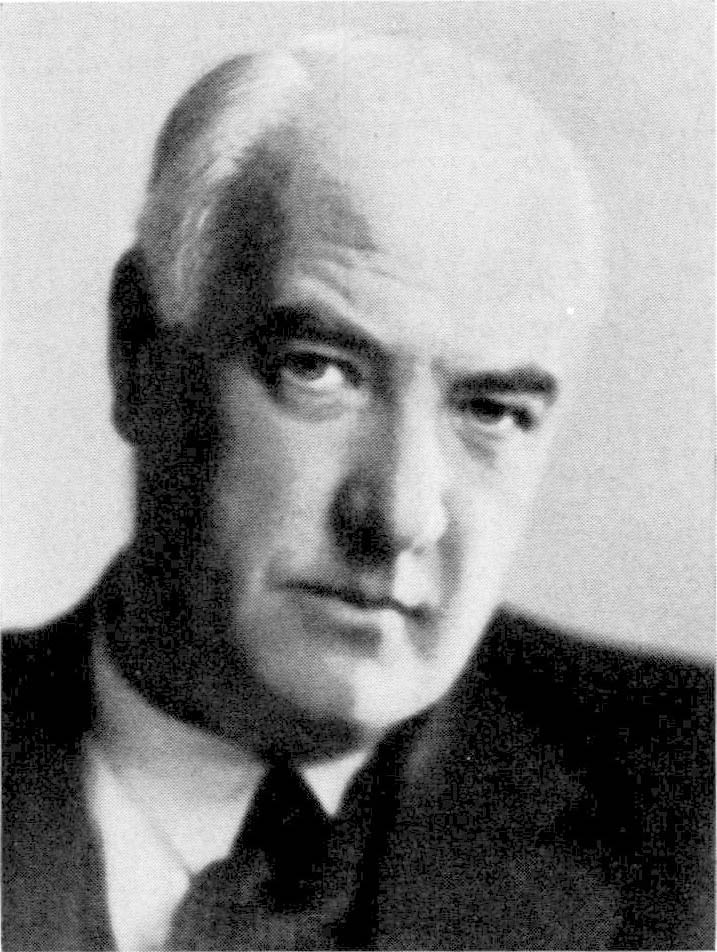
- Born: 20 November 1889; Skog, Gavleborg, Sweden
- Died: 6 December 1963 (aged 74); Stockholm, Sweden
- Occupations: Editor Writer, Director
- Years active: 1924-1955 (film)

Ivar Johansson (1889–1963) was a Swedish film director, screenwriter and editor. He specialised particularly in films shot on location in the Swedish countryside and directed Ingrid Bergman in her first dramatic role in Ocean Breakers in 1935.

== Selected filmography ==
- The People of Simlang Valley (1924)
- The Girl in Tails (1926)
- The Tales of Ensign Stål (1926)
- Gustaf Wasa (1928)
- The Realm of the Rye (1929)
- Skipper's Love (1931)
- The Storholmen Brothers (1932)
- Mother-in-Law's Coming (1932)
- Lucky Devils (1932)
- People of Hälsingland (1933)
- Boman's Boy (1933)
- The Song to Her (1934)
- Fired (1934)
- Ocean Breakers (1935)
- The Boys of Number Fifty Seven (1935)
- The Lady Becomes a Maid (1936)
- Mother Gets Married (1937)
- For Better, for Worse (1938)
- Storm Over the Skerries (1938)
- Between Us Barons (1939)
- Oh, What a Boy! (1939)
- The Crazy Family (1940)
- The Train Leaves at Nine (1941)
- We're All Errand Boys (1941)
- If I Could Marry the Minister (1941)
- Take Care of Ulla (1942)
- The Yellow Clinic (1942)
- Captured by a Voice (1943)
- Young Blood (1943)
- Eaglets (1944)
- The Forest Is Our Heritage (1944)
- The Österman Brothers' Virago (1945)
- Motherhood (1945)
- The Wedding on Solö (1946)
- Life in the Finnish Woods (1947)
- The Poetry of Ådalen (1947)
- Carnival Evening (1948)
- Big Lasse of Delsbo (1949)
- The Devil and the Smalander (1949)
- The Realm of the Rye (1950)
- Kalle Karlsson of Jularbo (1952)
- In Lilac Time (1952)
- Ursula, the Girl from the Finnish Forests (1953)
- The Red Horses (1954)
- People of the Finnish Forests (1955)

== Bibliography ==
- Nelmes, Jill & Selbo, Jule. Women Screenwriters: An International Guide. Palgrave Macmillan, 2015.
- Paietta, Ann C.. Saints, Clergy and Other Religious Figures on Film and Television, 1895–2003. McFarland, 2005.
- Qvist, Per Olov & von Bagh, Peter. Guide to the Cinema of Sweden and Finland. Greenwood Publishing Group, 2000.
