= Louise Edlind Friberg =

Swedish actress, model and politician

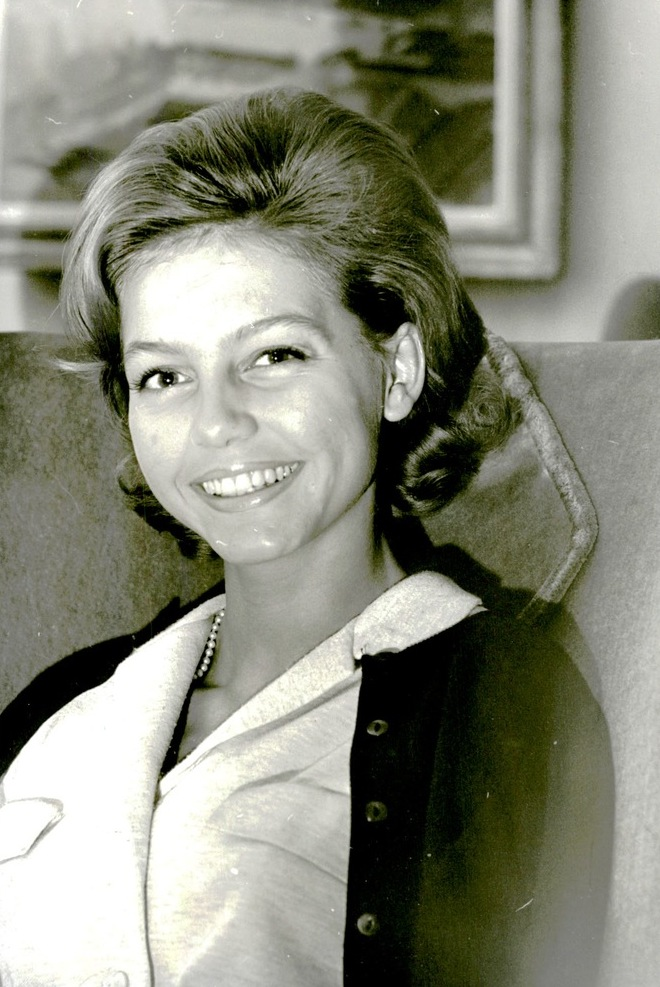
Louise Edlind Friberg, 1964

Sandra Louise Maud Edlind Friberg (born Louise Edlind on 15 July 1946) is a Swedish actress, model and politician.

== Acting career ==
As an actress she became popular as Malin Melkersson, the kind, warm and beautiful older sister in the popular 1964 children's TV series Vi på Saltkråkan, which frequently enjoys re-runs on Swedish television, and the subsequent Saltkråkan movies. The script for the series was written by Astrid Lindgren.

She got positive reviews for her part in the American film Le Mans in 1971, starring Steve McQueen. The same year she starred in the Swedish movie Lockfågeln. More recently, she had a major part in the soap opera Vänner och Fiender between 1996 and 1999.

== Political work ==
Edlind Friberg is a politician for the Swedish Liberal People's Party. She was a substitute in the Riksdag from 2003, and on 1 January 2006 she became a full member of the parliament. She lost her seat in the Riksdag following the 2006 elections.

== Personal life ==
She was married to doctor Sten Friberg from 1966 until his death in 2017

According to her own account, during the filming of the movie Le Mans in 1970, Edlind Friberg claimed to have had a brief affair with her fellow co-star Steve McQueen

== Later career ==
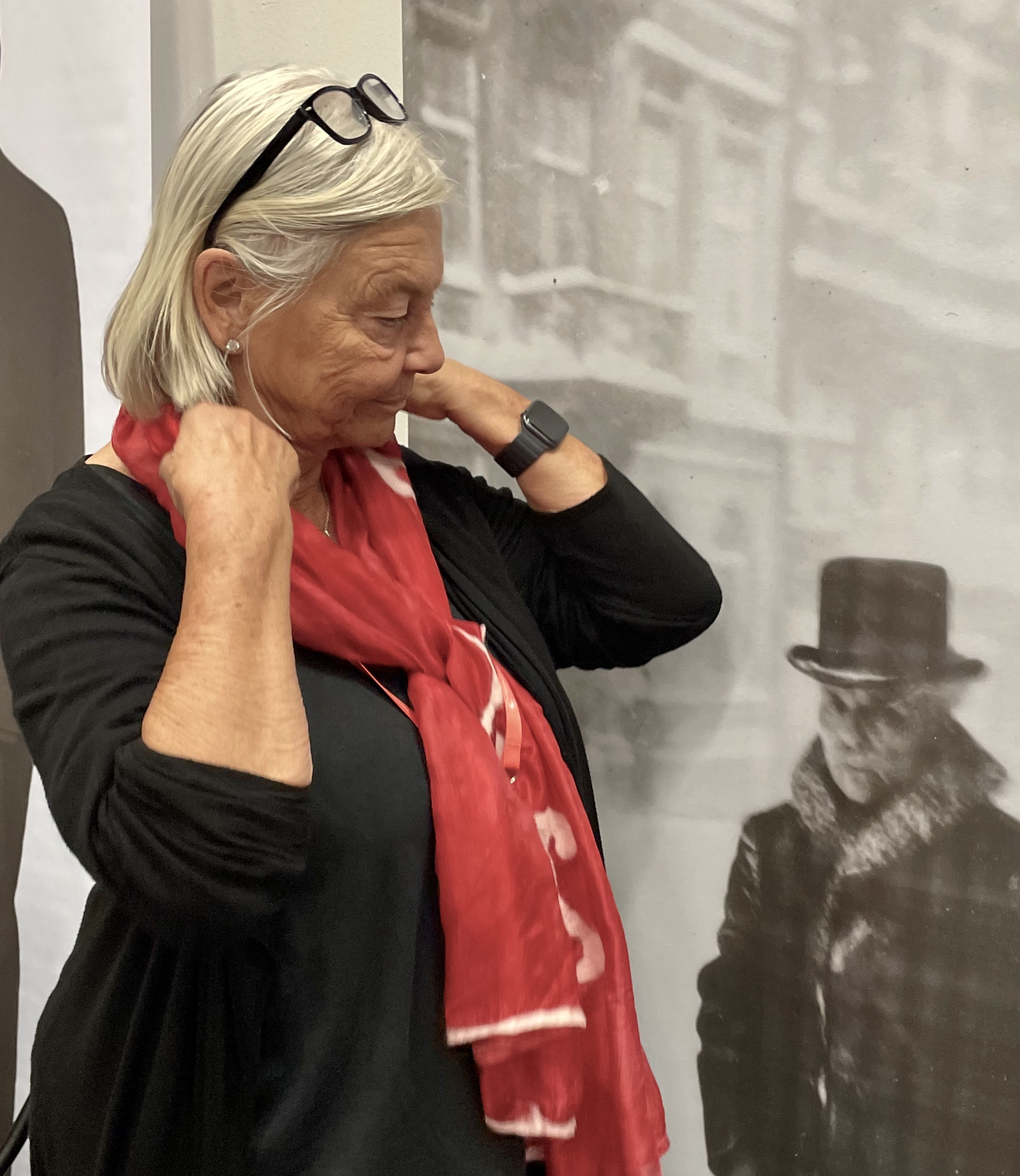
Louise Edlind Friberg in 2023.

Louise Edlind Friberg is a member in the board of August Strindberg Society.

== Filmography ==
- Vi på Saltkråkan (1964, Sweden (TV series))
- Tjorven, Båtsman och Moses (1964, Sweden)
- Tjorven och Skrållan (1965, Sweden)
- Tjorven och Mysak (1966, Sweden)
- Skrållan, Ruskprick och Knorrhane (1967, Sweden)
- Vi på Saltkråkan (1968, Sweden (movie version))
- Lockfågeln (1971, Sweden)
- Le Mans (1971, USA)
- Vänner och fiender (1996–1999, Sweden (TV series))
- Barnvakten (2007, Sweden (Short))
- Morden i Sandhamn (2010, Sweden (TV series)
- Psalm 21 (2010, Sweden)
- Stugan i skuggan (2013, Sweden)
- Quicksand (2019, Sweden)
