= Motherhood (1945 film) =

1945 film

- Directed by: Ivar Johansson
- Written by: Lis Asklund; Sam Clason; Torsten Lundqvist; John Albert Wemmerlöv
- Produced by: John Albert Wemmerlöv
- Starring: Birgit Rosengren; Björn Berglund; Allan Bohlin
- Cinematography: Walter Boberg
- Edited by: Ivar Johansson
- Music by: Ernfrid Ahlin
- Production companies: Athenafilm; Svea Film
- Release date: 19 September 1945
- Running time: 109 minutes
- Country: Sweden
- Language: Swedish

Motherhood or The Grief and Joy of Motherhood (Swedish: Moderskapets kval och lycka) is a 1945 Swedish drama film directed by Ivar Johansson and starring Birgit Rosengren, Björn Berglund and Allan Bohlin. The film's sets were designed by the art director Bertil Duroj.

== Synopsis ==
Eva-Maria Dahl lives a happy married life with husband Erik, but one day she faints and is taken to a doctor who informs her she is pregnant. This is concerning as a doctor has previously told her that with her health conditions it would be dangerous for her to have a child.

== Cast ==
- Birgit Rosengren as Eva-Maria Dahl
- Björn Berglund as Erik Dahl
- Ruth Moberg as Kerstin Manell
- Allan Bohlin as Sture Manell
- Barbro Ribbing as Anna Skog
- Marianne Löfgren as Mrs. Clarin
- Nils Kihlberg as Mr. Clarin
- Anna-Lisa Baude as Mrs. Berg
- Anna Lindahl as Welfare Officer
- Millan Bolander as Nurse Märta
- Lisskulla Jobs as Ellen Karlsson
- Elof Ahrle as Svenne Karlsson
- Gösta Cederlund as Chief Physician
- Sten Lindgren as Doctor
- Börje Mellvig as Gynecologist
- Naemi Briese as Woman with Erik at the Inn
- Gunnar Ekwall as Svensson
- Eivor Engelbrektsson as Nurse
- Lisbeth Hedendahl as Mrs. Holmgren
- Agda Helin as Mrs. Björk
- Margareta Högfors as Miss Klein
- Greta Liming as Toy store assistant
- Signe Lundberg-Settergren as Midwife
- Millan Lyxell as Clerk at the maternity ward
- Britta Nordin as Elsa Göransson
- Hanny Schedin as Woman at the maternity ward
- Georg Skarstedt as Father in taxi
- Carin Swensson as Shop assistant in milk store
- Greta Tegnér as Internship Nurse
- Ivar Wahlgren as Toy store customer

== Bibliography ==
- Qvist, Per Olov & von Bagh, Peter. Guide to the Cinema of Sweden and Finland. Greenwood Publishing Group, 2000.
