= Signe Wirff =

Swedish actress (1887–1956)

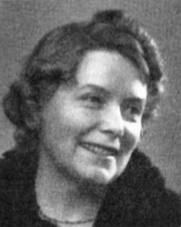
- Born: 4 November 1887; Stockholm, Sweden
- Died: 18 December 1956 (aged 69)
- Occupation: Actress
- Years active: 1921–1955

Signe Wirff (4 November 1887 – 18 December 1956) was a Swedish film actress. She appeared in more than 30 films between 1921 and 1955.

== Selected filmography ==
- House Slaves (1933)
- Adventure in Pyjamas (1935)
- A Cruise in the Albertina (1938)
- Sun Over Sweden (1938)
- A Real Man (1940)
- How to Tame a Real Man (1941)
- Nothing Is Forgotten (1942)
- Young Blood (1943)
- Imprisoned Women (1943)
- Man's Woman (1945)
- Kristin Commands (1946)
- Crisis (1946)
- Incorrigible (1946)
- The People of Simlang Valley (1947)
- Restaurant Intim (1950)
- Jack of Hearts (1950)
- Pimpernel Svensson (1950)
- Getting Married (1955)
- Whoops! (1955)
