= Song of Stockholm =

1947 film

- Directed by: Elof Ahrle
- Written by: Sven Forssell; Arthur Spjuth
- Produced by: Arthur Spjuth
- Starring: Elof Ahrle; Alice Babs; Bengt Logardt
- Cinematography: Göran Strindberg
- Edited by: Lennart Wallén
- Music by: Sune Waldimir
- Production company: Ahrle Film
- Distributed by: Sandrew-Baumanfilm
- Release date: 22 February 1947
- Running time: 104 minutes
- Country: Sweden
- Language: Swedish

Song of Stockholm (Swedish: Sången om Stockholm) is a 1947 Swedish musical drama film directed by Elof Ahrle and starring Ahrle, Alice Babs and Bengt Logardt. The film's sets were designed by the art director Arthur Spjuth.

== Cast ==
- Elof Ahrle as Knatten
- Alice Babs as Britt
- Bengt Logardt as Jan
- Åke Grönberg as Åke
- Marianne Gyllenhammar as Anne-Marie
- Anders Börje as Anders
- Hilda Borgström as Jans mor
- Douglas Håge as Britts far
- Carin Swensson as Gullan
- Nils Ferlin as Nils
- Sune Waldimir as Sune
- Eric Gustafson as Direktör Rosenstam
- Gustaf Lövås as Rakbladsförsäljaren

== Bibliography ==
- Qvist, Per Olov & von Bagh, Peter. Guide to the Cinema of Sweden and Finland. Greenwood Publishing Group, 2000.
