= The Poetry of Ådalen (1947 film) =

1947 film

- Directed by: Ivar Johansson
- Written by: Ivar Johansson
- Based on: Kärnfolk by Pelle Molin
- Produced by: Rune Waldekranz
- Starring: Adolf Jahr; Wilma Malmlöf; Nine-Christine Jönsson
- Cinematography: Carl-Erik Edlund
- Edited by: Carl-Olov Skeppstedt
- Music by: Gunnar Johansson
- Production company: Sandrews
- Distributed by: Sandrew-Baumanfilm
- Release date: 26 December 1947
- Running time: 94 minutes
- Country: Sweden
- Language: Swedish

The Poetry of Ådalen (Swedish: Ådalens poesi) is a 1947 Swedish drama film directed by Ivar Johansson and starring Adolf Jahr, Wilma Malmlöf and Nine-Christine Jönsson. It was shot at the Centrumateljéerna Studios in Stockholm. The film's sets were designed by the art director Bibi Lindström. It is a remake of the 1928 silent film of the same title.

== Cast ==
- Adolf Jahr as Zackris Månsson
- Wilma Malmlöf as Mrs. Månsson
- Nine-Christine Jönsson as Imbär
- Sten Lindgren as Kerstorps-farmer
- Naima Wifstrand as Kersti
- Kenne Fant as Olle
- Hans Järrsten as Olle as a child
- Ingrid Strandberg as Imbär as a child
- Erik Sundqvist as Pelle Molin
- Per-Axel Arosenius as Lindskog
- Alf Östlund as Ferry-boat man
- Torgny Anderberg as Per-Matts
- Eric Laurent as Vicar
- Georg Skarstedt as Manfred
- Birger Åsander as Jonas Bode

== Bibliography ==
- Qvist, Per Olov & von Bagh, Peter. Guide to the Cinema of Sweden and Finland. Greenwood Publishing Group, 2000.
