= Erik Rosén =

Swedish actor (1883–1967)

- Born: 13 July 1883; Gothenburg, Sweden
- Died: 3 January 1967 (aged 83); Stockholm, Sweden
- Occupation: Actor
- Years active: 1933-1953

Erik Rosén (13 July 1883 – 3 January 1967) was a Swedish film actor. He appeared in more than 40 films between 1933 and 1953.

== Selected filmography ==
- The Marriage Game (1935)
- Ocean Breakers (1935)
- Under False Flag (1935)
- The Lady Becomes a Maid (1936)
- The People of Bergslagen (1937)
- John Ericsson, Victor of Hampton Roads (1937)
- Dollar (1938)
- Sunny Sunberg (1941)
- The Talk of the Town (1941)
- Adventurer (1942)
- It Is My Music (1942)
- There's a Fire Burning (1943)
- Imprisoned Women (1943)
- Young Blood (1943)
- Turn of the Century (1944)
- Black Roses (1945)
- It Rains on Our Love (1946)
- Johansson and Vestman (1946)
- Don't Give Up (1947)
- Dance, My Doll (1953)
