= My Friend Oscar =

1951 film

- Directed by: Pierre Billon; Åke Ohberg
- Written by: Charles de Richter (novel); Pierre Billon; Marc-Gilbert Sauvajon
- Starring: Åke Söderblom; Margareta Fahlén; Olof Winnerstrand
- Cinematography: Nikolai Toporkoff
- Edited by: Andrée Danis
- Music by: Sune Waldimir
- Production company: Terrafilm
- Distributed by: Nordisk Tonefilm
- Release date: 20 January 1951
- Running time: 85 minutes
- Country: Sweden
- Language: Swedish

My Friend Oscar (Swedish: Min vän Oscar) is a 1951 Swedish comedy film directed by Pierre Billon and Åke Ohberg and starring Åke Söderblom, Margareta Fahlén and Olof Winnerstrand. A separate French-language version My Seal and Them was also produced at the same time and with the same director.

It was shot at the Photosonor Studios in Courbevoie on the outskirts of Paris. The film's sets were designed by the art director René Moulaert.

== Synopsis ==
While on a trip to Paris a young Swedish man wins Oscar, a seal, in a raffle who proceeds to cause chaos in his life.

== Cast ==
- Åke Söderblom as Hans Lövgren
- Margareta Fahlén as Gabriella Strandberg
- Olof Winnerstrand as Claes-Herman Sundelius
- Barbro Larsson as Diana Sundelius
- Douglas Håge as Oscar
- Börje Mellvig as Stenström
- Sven Lindberg as Zoologist
- Jeanne Fusier-Gir as Lövgren's Housemaid
- Pierre Bertin as UNESCO Director-General
- René Alié as Policeman
- Odette Barencey as Woman
- Albert Bour as Fish Salesman
- Gil Delamare as Policeman
- Raymond Rognoni as Zoo Owner
- Pierre Sergeol as Restaurant Owner
- Made Siamé as Fish Seller

== Bibliography ==
- Qvist, Per Olov & von Bagh, Peter. Guide to the Cinema of Sweden and Finland. Greenwood Publishing Group, 2000.
