= Eric Laurent (actor) =

Swedish actor

- Born: 6 May 1894; Västernorrland, Sweden
- Died: 27 January 1958 (aged 63); Stockholm, Sweden
- Occupation: Actor
- Years active: 1920-1953 (film)

Eric Laurent (1894–1958) was a Swedish stage and film actor.

== Selected filmography ==
- The Poetry of Ådalen (1928)
- The Realm of the Rye (1929)
- Lucky Devils (1932)
- Oh, What a Boy! (1939)
- The Train Leaves at Nine (1941)
- Doctor Glas (1942)
- Imprisoned Women (1943)
- The Forest Is Our Heritage (1944)
- Life in the Finnish Woods (1947)
- The Poetry of Ådalen (1947)
- Lars Hård (1948)
- Big Lasse of Delsbo (1949)
- Son of the Sea (1949)
- The Realm of the Rye (1950)
- Stronger Than the Law (1951)
- U-Boat 39 (1952)
- Ursula, the Girl from the Finnish Forests (1953)

== Bibliography ==
- Goble, Alan. The Complete Index to Literary Sources in Film. Walter de Gruyter, 1999.
