= Ursula, the Girl from the Finnish Forests =

1953 film

- Directed by: Ivar Johansson
- Written by: Ivar Johansson
- Based on: Ursula by Jol Strand
- Produced by: Rune Waldekranz
- Starring: Eva Stiberg; Birger Malmsten; Naima Wifstrand
- Cinematography: Hilding Bladh
- Edited by: Carl-Olov Skeppstedt
- Music by: Charles Redland
- Production company: Sandrews
- Distributed by: Sandrew-Baumanfilm
- Release date: 2 March 1953
- Running time: 99 minutes
- Country: Sweden
- Language: Swedish

Ursula, the Girl from the Finnish Forests (Swedish: Ursula - Flickan i Finnskogarna) is a 1953 Swedish drama film directed by Ivar Johansson and starring Eva Stiberg, Birger Malmsten and Naima Wifstrand. It was shot at the Centrumateljéerna Studios in Stockholm and on location in Värmland County. The film's sets were designed by the art director Bibi Lindström. It was one of several films the director made featuring the Forest Finns.

== Synopsis ==
Ursula is the daughter of a farmer, but she is faced with the dilemma of continuing with her studies of taking over her father's farm.

== Cast ==
- Eva Stiberg as Ursula Cecilia Persson
- Birger Malmsten as Hans Halvarsson
- Naima Wifstrand as Mossi
- Olof Bergström as Erik von Holk
- Dagmar Ebbesen as Kersti
- Artur Rolén as Jöns Virtta
- Åke Fridell as Kåre Flatten
- Sten Lindgren as Karl Persson
- Arne Källerud as Torsén
- Olof Sandborg as Judge
- Peter Lindgren as Arne
- Arne Lindblad as Haikko
- Carl-Olof Alm as Bengt
- Lissi Alandh as Gerslög
- Arthur Fischer as Karlsson
- Harald Emanuelsson as Göran 'Manne' Stangen
- Wilma Malmlöf as Mrs. Svensson
- Alf Östlund as Svensson, court janitor
- Nils Hultgren as Bengt Halvarsson
- Helga Brofeldt as Tilda, Haikko's wife
- Björn Berglund as Chairman
- Gustaf Färingborg as Erik Jansson
- Gunlög Hagberg as Jenny, Ursula's friend
- Ivar Hallbäck as Lindstedt, vicar
- Svea Holst as Fina
- Eric Laurent as Karl Jönsson
- Birger Lensander as Vestlund
- Karin Miller as Hulda, maid
- Emy Storm as Marit

== Bibliography ==
- Qvist, Per Olov & von Bagh, Peter. Guide to the Cinema of Sweden and Finland. Greenwood Publishing Group, 2000.
