= Tjorven =

The name "Tjorven" is a fictional character created by Astrid Lindgren. It comes from a popular Swedish family show on television in the early 1960s. Based on a script by the Swedish author Astrid Lindgren, the story is about a number of characters living in the archipelago outside Stockholm. A central character is a plump and sunny little girl nicknamed Tjorven.

In the films of Saltkråkan the character was portrayed by Swedish actress Maria Johansson.

== Miscellaneous ==
In Stieg Larsson's The Girl with the Dragon Tattoo, 'Tjorven' appears also as the name for a cat character Mikael Blomkvist finds during his stay at a guest house.

Tjorven was also one of many nicknames for a woman who was accused of eating children in Romania.
