= Lasse Krantz =

Swedish actor

- Born: 10 August 1903; Kristianstad, Sweden
- Died: 10 January 1973 (aged 69); Stockholm, Sweden
- Occupation: Actor
- Years active: 1931-1968

Lasse Krantz (10 August 1903 – 10 January 1973) was a Swedish film actor. He appeared in more than 20 films between 1931 and 1968.

== Selected filmography ==
- How to Tame a Real Man (1941)
- Dolly Takes a Chance (1944)
- The Old Clock at Ronneberga (1944)
- Peggy on a Spree (1946)
- The Wedding on Solö (1946)
- Evening at the Djurgarden (1946)
- A Ship to India (1947)
- Two Women (1947)
- Loffe the Tramp (1948)
- The Kiss on the Cruise (1950)
- The Girl in Tails (1956)
- Woman of Darkness (1966)
