= How to Tame a Real Man =

1941 film

- Directed by: Ragnar Arvedson
- Written by: Torsten Flodén
- Produced by: Ragnar Arvedson
- Starring: Birgit Tengroth; Håkan Westergren; Thor Modéen
- Cinematography: Harald Berglund
- Music by: Nathan Görling
- Production company: Europa Film
- Distributed by: Europa Film
- Release date: 12 April 1941
- Running time: 100 minutes
- Country: Sweden
- Language: Swedish

How to Tame a Real Man (Swedish: Så tuktas en äkta man) is a 1941 Swedish comedy film directed by Ragnar Arvedson and starring Birgit Tengroth, Håkan Westergren and Thor Modéen. It was shot at the Sundbyberg Studios in Stockholm. The film's sets were designed by the art director Max Linder. The following year it was remade as a Finnish film Avioliittoyhtiö.

== Synopsis ==
An interior designer in Stockholm keeps flirting with his pretty female employees. Deciding this is harming his work he decides he needs to hire an unattractive new assistant, and his friend at the local university suggests a gifted candidate. However she is pretty, so he deliberately encourages her to disguise her good looks in order to secure the job.

== Cast ==
- Birgit Tengroth as Anne-Marie Hedberg
- Håkan Westergren as Göran Brehmer
- Thor Modéen as Kalle Fager
- Dagmar Ebbesen as Anna Matilda Blid
- Liane Linden as Gunilla Gripclou
- Stig Järrel as Banker Baltzar Hassler
- Gösta Cederlund as Björn Thorelius
- Hugo Björne as Charles B. Sjöberg
- Signe Wirff as Mrs. Sjöberg
- Solveig Hedengran as Lillemor Bergling
- Carin Swensson as Lady-Friend
- Elly Christiansson as Vera
- Gull Natorp as Miss Beate-Sophie Gripclou
- Anna-Lisa Baude as Doctor's wife
- Åke Engfeldt as Bertil Bergling
- Carl-Gunnar Wingård as Constable
- Åke Jensen as Carl-Erik
- Siv Ericks as Maud
- Gun Schubert as Miss Dahlberg
- Ragnar Widestedt as Delmar
- Olav Riégo as Solicitor
- Tord Stål as Anne-Maries friend
- Rolf Botvid as Anne-Maries friend
- Artur Cederborgh as Director Hallberg
- Lasse Krantz as Axel
- Georg Fernqvist as Maitre d'
- Karl Erik Flens as Shop assistant
- Anders Frithiof as Priest
- Ann-Margret Bergendahl as Telephone operator
- Bengt Logardt as Anne-Marie's friend

== Bibliography ==
- Holmstrom, John. The Moving Picture Boy: An International Encyclopaedia from 1895 to 1995. Michael Russell, 1996.
