= Carnival Evening =

1948 film

- Directed by: Ivar Johansson
- Written by: Vilhelm Moberg (play); Ivar Johansson
- Starring: Adolf Jahr; Emy Hagman; Sigge Fürst
- Cinematography: Hilding Bladh
- Edited by: Lennart Wallén
- Music by: Charles Redland
- Production company: Sandrews
- Distributed by: Sandrew-Bauman
- Release date: 31 July 1948
- Running time: 78 minutes
- Country: Sweden
- Language: Swedish

Carnival Evening (Swedish: Marknadsafton) is a 1948 Swedish comedy drama film directed by Ivar Johansson and starring Adolf Jahr, Emy Hagman and Sigge Fürst. It was shot at the Centrumateljéerna Studios in Stockholm. The film's sets were designed by the art director Bibi Lindström and P.A. Lundgren.

== Synopsis ==
The farmer Magni plans to marry Teresia, but the maid Lovisa has her own plans for him.

== Cast ==
- Adolf Jahr as Magni
- Emy Hagman as Lovisa
- Sigge Fürst as Rapp
- Rut Holm as Teresia
- John Ekman as Otto
- Carin Swensson as Karna
- Anna-Lisa Baude as Shop assistant in gold store
- John W. Björling as Drunk
- Arthur Fischer as Blind man
- Hjördis Gille as Old lady
- Eric Gustafson as Upset man
- Viktor Haak as Blacksmith
- Nils Hultgren as Tailor
- Gösta Qvist as Jonas
- Bellan Roos as Lena
- Lillie Wästfeldt as Old lady

== Bibliography ==
- Krawc, Alfred. International Directory of Cinematographers, Set- and Costume Designers in Film: Denmark, Finland, Norway, Sweden (from the beginnings to 1984). Saur, 1986.
- Qvist, Per Olov & von Bagh, Peter. Guide to the Cinema of Sweden and Finland. Greenwood Publishing Group, 2000.
