= Margareta Fahlén =

Swedish actress (1918–1978)

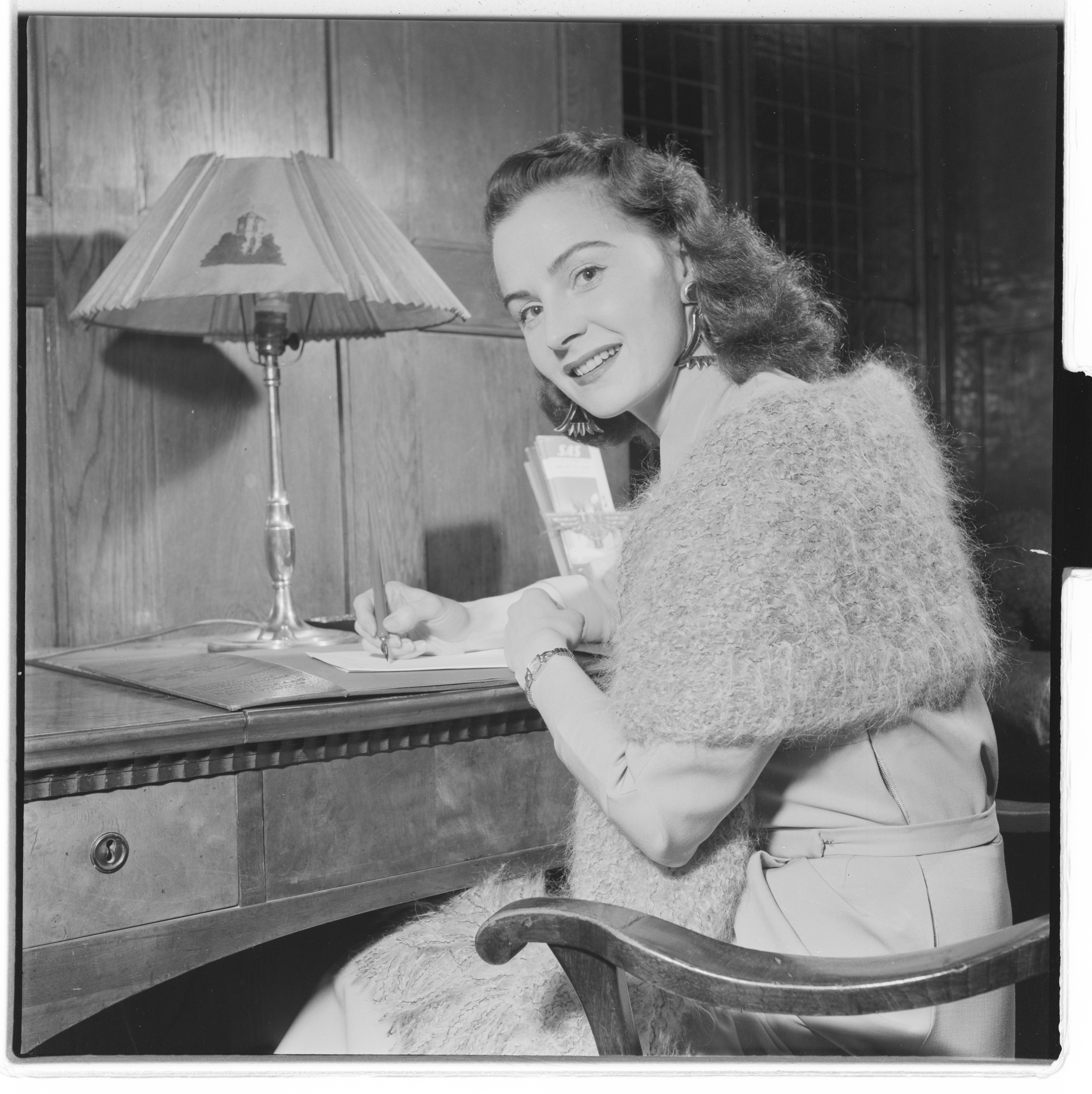
- Margareta Fahlén (1955)
- Born: Gerd Margareta Fahlén; 8 June 1918; Sollefteå, Sweden
- Died: 28 October 1978 (aged 60); Copenhagen, Denmark
- Occupation: Actress
- Spouse: Poul Reichhardt (1955-divorced 1962)

Gerd Margareta Fahlén (8 June 1918 – 28 October 1978) was a Swedish actress.

== Biography ==
Fahlén grew up in Uppsala. After she finished her studies, she moved to Stockholm to work; in parallel with her work, she began pursuing her interest in theater. She was noticed in 1941, and she made her screen debut in 1943 in Ivar Johansson's Young Blood in 1943. She entered the Dramat's school in 1944, and studied there until 1947, when, during her graduation year, she was given the role of Kristina in August Strindberg's Easter. This breakthrough led to her being awarded the role of Helga in Gustaf Edgren's Tösen från Stormyrtorpet (1947). A short but intense film career followed, spanning the 1940s and the early 1950s.

From 1955 to 1962, she was married to the actor Poul Reichhardt; during this time, she lived in Denmark and only acted sporadically. She spent the last 15 years of her life working as a medical secretary at the Orthopedic Hospital in Copenhagen.

== Selected filmography ==
- She Thought It Was Him (1943)
- Young Blood (1943)
- I Killed (1943)
- Eaglets (1944)
- Skipper Jansson (1944)
- Black Roses (1945)
- Iris and the Lieutenant (1946)
- Crime in the Sun (1947)
- The Girl from the Marsh Croft (1947)
- A Swedish Tiger (1948)
- Woman in White (1949)
- Jack of Hearts (1950)
- My Friend Oscar (1951)
- Stronger Than the Law (1951)
- For the Sake of My Intemperate Youth (1952)
- Kispus (1956)
