= Young Blood (1943 film) =

1943 film

- Directed by: Ivar Johansson
- Written by: Ivar Johansson
- Produced by: Sven Nygren
- Starring: Agneta Lagerfeldt; Toivo Pawlo; Olof Widgren
- Cinematography: Karl-Erik Alberts
- Edited by: Ivar Johansson
- Music by: Ernfrid Ahlin
- Production company: Film AB Lux
- Distributed by: Film AB Lux
- Release date: 12 October 1943
- Running time: 80 minutes
- Country: Sweden
- Language: Swedish

Young Blood (Swedish: Ungt blod) is a 1943 Swedish drama film written and directed by Ivar Johansson and starring Agneta Lagerfeldt, Toivo Pawlo and Olof Widgren. It was shot at the Centrumateljéerna Studios in Stockholm. The film's sets were designed by the art director Bertil Duroj.

== Cast ==
- Agneta Lagerfeldt as Eva Lindemark
- Toivo Pawlo as Åke Sjögren
- Olof Widgren as Sven Lindahl
- Barbro Ribbing as Anne-Marie Björkman
- Åke Claesson as Lars-Erik Hermansson
- Åke Grönberg as Gustaf Johansson
- Hugo Björne as Arvid Wetterberg
- Sven Bergvall as Per Lindemark
- Anna Lindahl as Lisa Lindemark
- Marianne Inger as Ingrid Forslund
- Britta Holmberg as Maj-Britt Hassel
- Christian Bratt as Lennart Berger
- Harry Ahlin as Hjelm
- Anna Lisa Bruce as Anna Karlsson
- Gunnel Edlund as Margit Modin
- Ernst Eklund as Major Björn Lindemark
- Ingrid Envall as Young Girl
- Margareta Fahlén as Karin Sandström
- Margareta Grimberg as Ellen Lönnquist
- Marianne Gyllenhammar as Maud von Rehnsköld
- Lennart Holmqvist as Nils Norrman
- Gunnar Höglund as Paul Pettersson
- Birgit Johannesson as Ann-Sophie Berg
- Ulla Kihlberg as Solveig Thysell
- Kolbjörn Knudsen as Karl-Hugo Stadius
- Sten Lindgren as Dr. Malm
- Rune Lycke as Young Man
- Marie-Louise Martins as Vivi Svensson
- Stig Olin as Pelle Persson
- Erik Rosén as Ulf Ragnar Thomasson
- Tulli Sjöblom as Birgit Frisk
- Kurt Willbing as Karl-Axel Eriksson
- Signe Wirff as Mrs. Lindemark
- Nils Åsblom as Erik Thysell

== Bibliography ==
- Qvist, Per Olov & von Bagh, Peter. Guide to the Cinema of Sweden and Finland. Greenwood Publishing Group, 2000.
