= Britta Holmberg =

Swedish actress

- Born: 21 December 1921; Fors, Södermanland, Sweden
- Died: 3 June 2004 (aged 82); Falsterbo, Skåne County, Sweden
- Other names: Britta Holmberg-Olin; Britta Olin
- Occupation: Actress
- Years active: 1942–1973
- Spouse: Stig Olin (m. 1944; div. 1980)
- Children: 3, including Lena Olin

Britta Alice Holmberg (21 December 1921 – 3 June 2004) was a Swedish actress. She appeared in 18 films between 1942 and 1973. She was married to actor Stig Olin (they eventually divorced), and is the mother of actress Lena Olin.

== Filmography ==
Year	Title	Role	Notes
1942	Tre glada tokar	Gäst på skidrestaurangen	Uncredited
1942	Jacobs stege	Dancing woman	Uncredited
1943	Young Blood	Maj-Britt Hassel	
1943	The Brothers' Woman	Agnes	
1944	Count Only the Happy Moments	Ingrid	
1945	Tre söner gick till flyget	Britta Bremer	
1946	Kvinnor i väntrum	Maj Hall	
1947	The Night Watchman's Wife	Ingegerd Lindberg	
1948	Lappblod	Aino Ahlström	
1948	Jørund Smed	Waljo	
1949	Prison	Birgitta's Mother in Dream	Voice
1954	Hjälpsamma herrn	Elisabeth	
1963	Tre dar i buren	Mrs. Nilsson	
1965	Åsa-Nisse slår till	Society Lady	
1968	Under ditt parasoll	Countess	
1968	Vindingevals	Mrs. Håkansson	
1972	Andersson's Kalle	Pilgrenskan	
1973	Andersson's Kalle on Top Form	Pilgrenskan	
