= The Devil and the Smalander (1949 film) =

1949 film

- Directed by: Ivar Johansson
- Written by: Ivar Johansson
- Starring: Stig Järrel; Sigge Fürst; Naima Wifstrand
- Cinematography: Carl-Erik Edlund; Sven Nykvist
- Edited by: Carl-Olov Skeppstedt
- Music by: Charles Redland
- Production company: Sandrews
- Distributed by: Sandrew-Baumanfilm
- Release date: 14 March 1949
- Running time: 82 minutes
- Country: Sweden
- Language: Swedish

The Devil and the Smalander (Swedish: Hin och smålänningen) is a 1949 Swedish drama film directed by Ivar Johansson and starring Stig Järrel, Sigge Fürst and Naima Wifstrand. It was shot at the Centrumateljéerna Studios in Stockholm. The film's sets were designed by the art director P.A. Lundgren. It is a remake of the 1927 silent film of the same title.

== Cast ==
- Stig Järrel as Gammel-Erik aka Hin aka van Zaaten
- Sigge Fürst as Gunnar Rask
- Naima Wifstrand as Titta Grå
- Ulla Andreasson as Elna
- Arthur Fischer as Ola Hansson
- Wilma Malmlöf as Malena
- Torgny Anderberg as Per
- Sten Lindgren as Smerling
- Ruth Weijden as Amelie Smerling
- Sigbrit Molin as Annie Smerling
- Bengt Logardt as Sven Smerling
- Willy Peters as Casimir
- Oscar Winge as Vicar David
- Gull Natorp as Gustava

== Bibliography ==
- Qvist, Per Olov & von Bagh, Peter. Guide to the Cinema of Sweden and Finland. Greenwood Publishing Group, 2000.
