= Erik Blomberg =

Finnish cinematographer

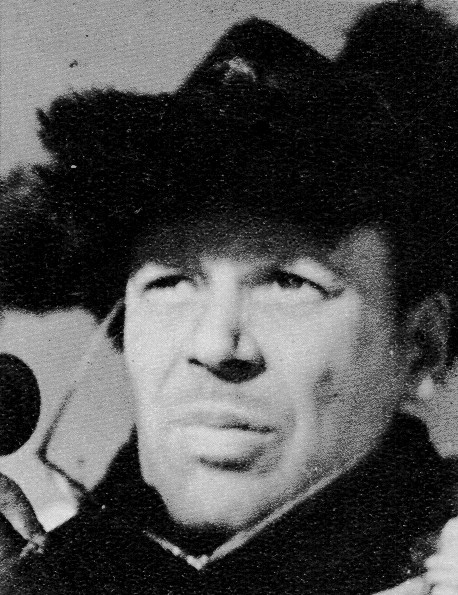
- Born: 18 September 1913; Helsinki, Finland
- Died: 12 October 1996 (aged 83); Kuusjoki, Finland
- Occupations: Cinematographer, film producer, screenwriter, film director
- Years active: 1936-1959

Erik Blomberg (18 September 1913 – 12 October 1996) was a Finnish cinematographer, film producer, screenwriter and film director. He was married to actress Mirjami Kuosmanen from 1939 until her death, from cancer, in August 1963.

They had four children.

== Selected filmography ==
- The Stolen Death (1938)
- One Man's Faith (1940)
- The Österman Brothers' Virago (1945)
- The Wedding on Solö (1946)
- Life in the Finnish Woods (1947)
- The White Reindeer (1953)
