= Segol Mann =

Swedish actor (1918–1992)

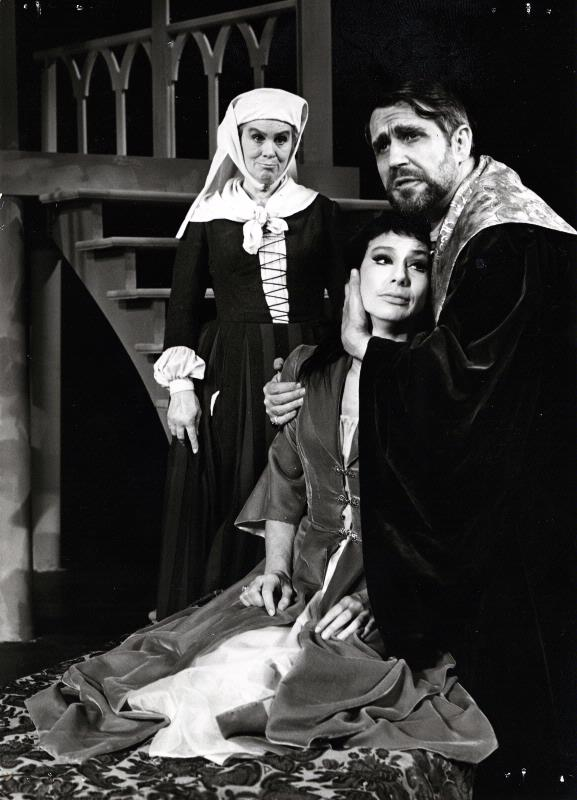
- Born: 19 July 1918
- Died: 23 November 1992 (aged 74); Stockholm, Sweden
- Occupation: Actor
- Years active: 1943-1984

Segol Mann (19 July 1918 – 23 November 1992) was a Swedish film actor. He appeared in more than 40 films between 1943 and 1984.

== Filmography ==
- Två solkiga blondiner (1984)
- Nattens lekar (1978)
- The Stone Face (1972)
- Magnetisören (1972)
- The Lie (1970)
- Eva - den utstötta (1969)
- Bandet (1964)
- Misantropen (1963)
- Handen på hjärtat (1962)
- Briggen Tre Liljor (1961)
- Stöten (1961)
- Sången om den eldröda blomman (1956)
- Krut och kärlek (1956)
- Wild Birds (1955)
- Seger i mörker (1954)
- Vägen till Klockrike (1953)
- Barabbas (1953)
- Defiance (1952)
- This Can't Happen Here (1950)
- Prison (1949)
- Banketten (1948)
- Music in Darkness (1948)
- Neglected by His Wife (1947)
- The Journey Away (1945)
- Gagmannen (1945)
- The Rose of Tistelön (1945)
- Man's Woman (1945)
- Dens osyniga muren (1944)
- Night in the Harbor (1943)
- There's a Fire Burning (1943)
