= Mirjami Kuosmanen =

Finnish actress (1915–1963)

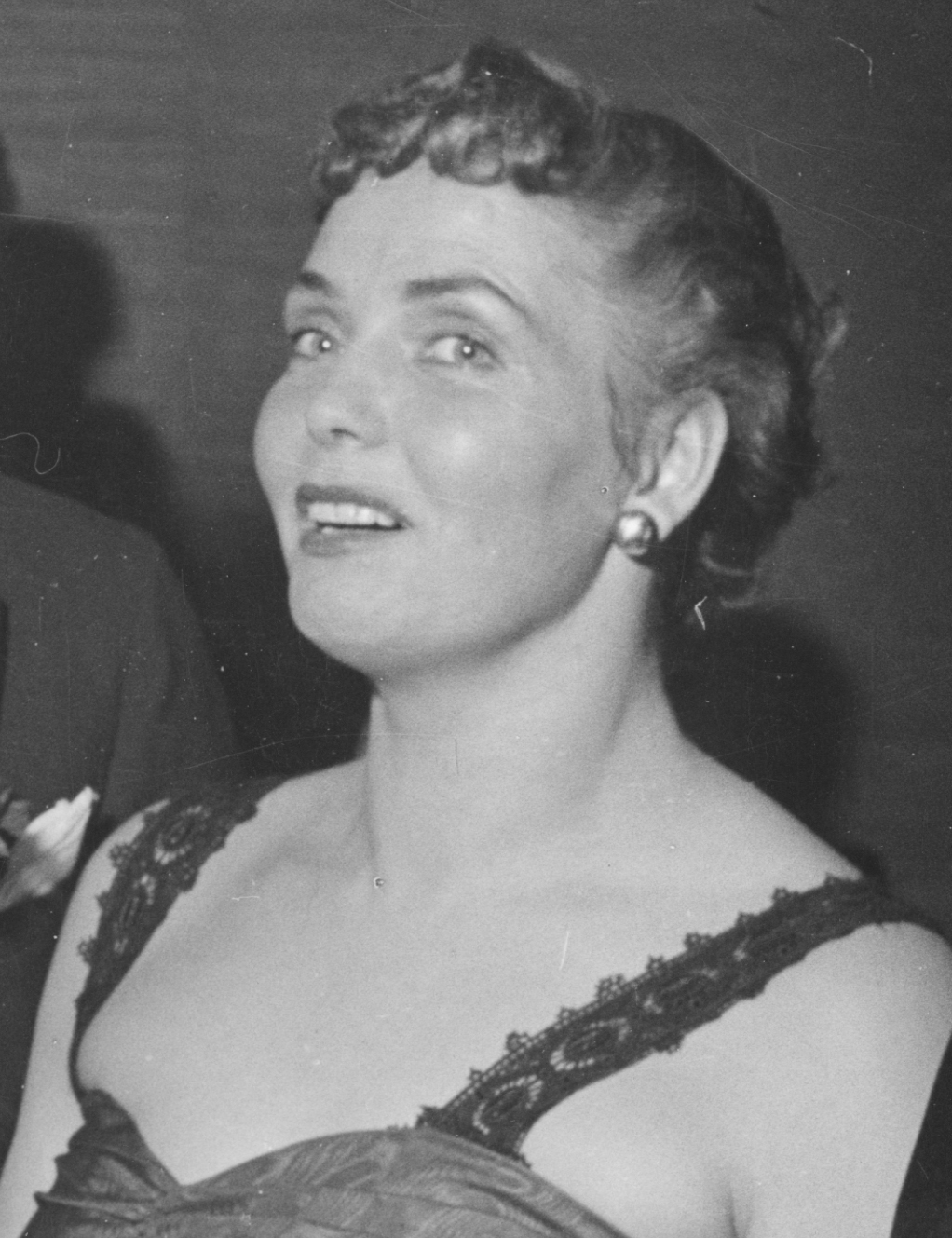
- Born: 22 February 1915; Keuruu, Finland
- Died: 5 August 1963 (aged 48); Helsinki, Finland
- Occupation: Actress
- Years active: 1937–1963

Mirjami Kuosmanen (22 February 1915 – 5 August 1963) was a Finnish actress. She appeared in 24 films between 1937 and 1956. In 1952, she won the Jussi Award for Best Actress for her role in The White Reindeer.

She was married to filmmaker Erik Blomberg from 1939 until her death in August 1963. They had four children.

Kuosmanen died suddenly from a brain hemorrhage at the age of 48.

== Selected filmography ==
- The Song of the Scarlet Flower (1938)
- Golden Light (1946)
- Life in the Finnish Woods (1947)
- The White Reindeer (1952)
