= Kristina Jämtmark =

Swedish actress

Kristina Jämtmark, real name Maria Christina Jämtmark, (born 19 May 1957) is a Swedish former child actress. She played the part of Stina, a little girl with a gap-toothed smile, in the 1964 TV series Vi på Saltkråkan, which is still being re-run regularly in Swedish television, as well as in the subsequent Saltkråkan movies.
