= Life on Seacrow Island =

1964 Swedish TV series by Astrid Lindgren

- Created by: Astrid Lindgren
- Directed by: Olle Hellbom
- Starring: Maria Johansson; Torsten Lilliecrona; Louise Edlind Friberg; Stephen Lindholm; Björn Söderbäck; Urban Strand; Bengt Eklund; Eva Stiberg
- Theme music composer: Ulf Björlin
- Country of origin: Sweden
- Original language: Swedish
- No. of seasons: 1
- No. of episodes: 13

Production
- Running time: ~25 min

Original release
- Release: 18 January – 11 April 1964

Life on Seacrow Island (Swedish: Vi på Saltkråkan) is a 1964 Swedish TV series, consisting of thirteen 25-minute episodes. The script for the series was written by Astrid Lindgren, who later re-wrote it as a book, also titled Vi på Saltkråkan (published in English as Seacrow Island in 1964). Astrid Lindgren was closely involved in the filming and editing of the series, which took place on Norröra in the Stockholm Archipelago. The series was produced and directed by Olle Hellbom.

== Plot ==
The series tells the story of a family from Stockholm, consisting of the widowed author Melker Melkersson (Torsten Lilliecrona) and his four children: 19-year-old Malin (Louise Edlind) who assumes the role of mother in the family, the imaginative 13-year-old Johan, 12-year-old Niklas who is calm and down-to-earth, and 7-year-old Pelle, who loves animals of all kinds. The Melkersson family spend their summer holidays as well as some winters on Saltkråkan, an idyllic place symbolising the unspoilt archipelago. The year-round inhabitants of the island are sometimes amused by the ineptness of the city dwellers, but they become fast friends with the Melkersson family: when the idyll is threatened, such as when the house the Melkerssons rent is being sold, the islanders rise to help their friends keep their summer paradise.

The Melkersson children become friends with the local kids: Tjorven (actually Maria) Grankvist who is the same age as Pelle and owns a huge St. Bernard dog named Båtsman (Boatswain), her older sisters Teddy and Freddy who teach Johan and Niklas to row and sail, and Stina, a gap-toothed Stockholm girl who spends her summer holidays with her grandfather, and who tells endless stories to the long-suffering adults around her. Astrid Lindgren added the character of Stina to the script when Olle Hellbom met Kristina Jämtmark and thought that she would make a good addition to the group of children.

The 13 episodes of the TV series were re-made into a film in 1968, but the original TV series is re-run almost yearly in Swedish television, and some of the actors have become very closely associated with their characters in the series. The series has been translated into German, and was popular enough to be broadcast more than 20 times.

== Film spin-offs ==
The popularity of the series led to the production of four full-length films:

- Tjorven, Båtsman och Moses (1964)
- Tjorven och Skrållan (1965)
- Tjorven och Mysak (1966)
- Skrållan, Ruskprick och Knorrhane (1967)

== Cast ==
- Torsten Lilliecrona - Melker Melkersson
- Louise Edlind Friberg - Malin Melkersson
- Björn Söderbäck - Johan Melkersson
- Urban Strand - Niklas Melkersson
- Stephen Lindholm - Pelle Melkersson
- Bengt Eklund - Nisse Grankvist
- Eva Stiberg - Märta Grankvist
- Maria Johansson - Maria "Tjorven" Grankvist
- Lillemor Österlund - Teddy Grankvist
- Bitte Ulvskog - Freddy Grankvist
- Sigge Fischer - Söderman
- Kristina Jämtmark - Stina, Söderman's granddaughter
- Tommy Johnson - Björn
- Märta Arbin - Mrs. Sjöblom
- Alf Östlund - Mr. Carlberg
- Vivianne Westman - Lotta, Carlberg's daughter
- Birger Lensander - Mr. Mattson
- Stig Hallgren - Farmer Jansson
- Eddie Axberg - Kalle
- Lars Göran Carlson - Krister
- Sven Almgren - Berra
