= Barbro Larsson =

Swedish actress (1931–2025)

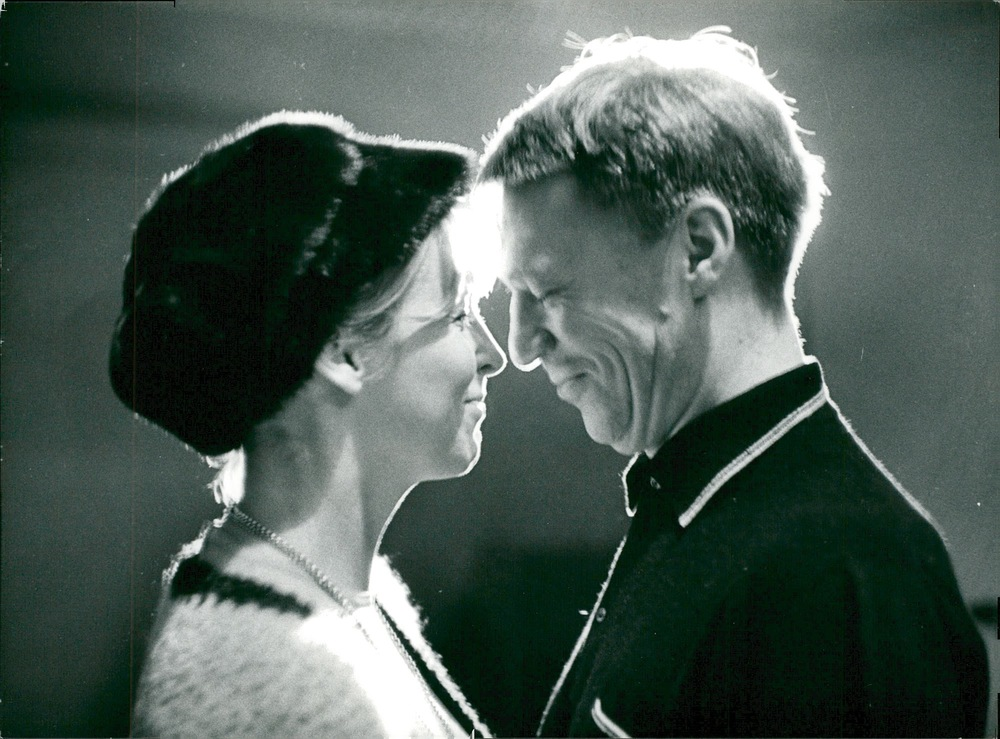
- Larsson and Anders Ek in 1966
- Born: 8 January 1931; Stockholm, Sweden
- Died: 9 January 2025 (aged 94); Stockholm, Sweden
- Occupation: Actress
- Years active: 1950–? (film)

Barbro Eva Linnéa Larsson (8 January 1931 – 9 January 2025) was a Swedish stage and film actress. She was married to the actor Lennart Lindberg in the 1950s. Larsson died on 9 January 2025, at the age of 94.

== Selected filmography ==
- Jack of Hearts (1950)
- My Friend Oscar (1951)
- Time of Desire (1954)
- Blue Sky (1955)
- Stage Entrance (1956)

== Bibliography ==
- Goble, Alan. The Complete Index to Literary Sources in Film. Walter de Gruyter, 1999.
