= Gunnar Skoglund =

Swedish film director (1889–1983)

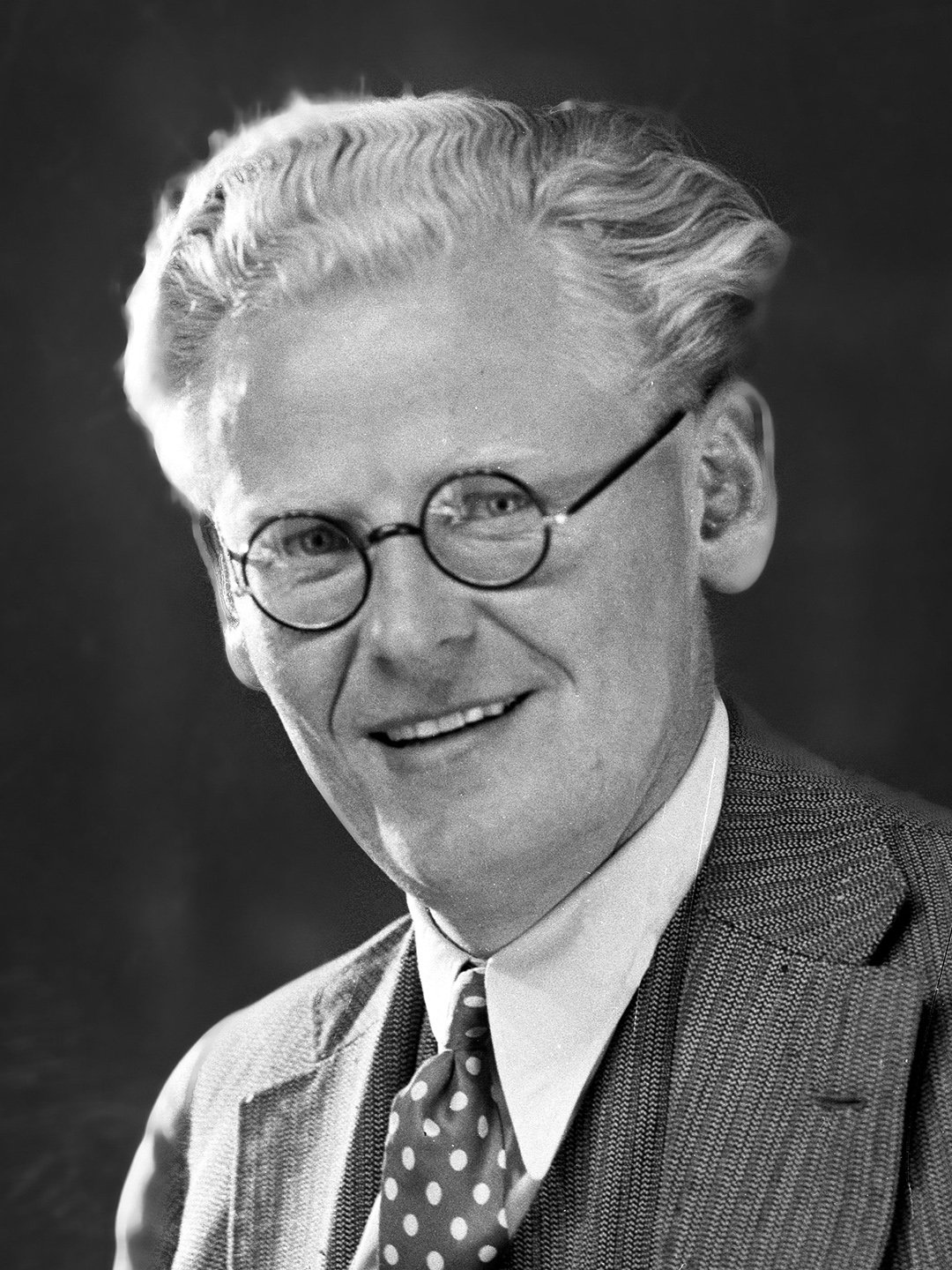
- 1950-1960
- Born: 2 September 1889; Stockholm, Sweden
- Died: 22 September 1983 (aged 94); Nynäshamn, Sweden
- Occupations: Director, Writer, Editor, Actor
- Years active: 1928-1959 (film)

Gunnar Skoglund (2 September 1889–22 September 1983) was a Swedish film director, editor and screenwriter. He also acted in several films. He worked on a number of newsreels for Svensk Filmindustri.

== Selected filmography ==
- Black Rudolf (1928)
- International Match (1932)
- Art for Art's Sake (1938)
- Woman on Board (1941)
- The Old Clock at Ronneberga (1944)
- Man's Woman (1945)
- How to Love (1947)
- The Road to Klockrike (1953)

== Bibliography ==
- Hjort, Mette & Lindqvist, Ursula. A Companion to Nordic Cinema. John Wiley & Sons, 2016.
