= Samuel Torvend =

American theologian

Samuel Torvend is an American theologian.

== Biography ==
Samuel Torvend teaches courses in the history of Christianity and historical courses on specific topics at Pacific Lutheran University in Tacoma, Washington. Torvend held the endowed chair in Lutheran Studies at PLU for several years and held the position of interim Director of the Wild Hope Center in 2019.

In all of these courses, his early interest in the relationship between Christian insights and practices with a culture’s social, economic, and political systems continues to engage students with the power of religion to shape public life. He also teaches an introductory course in the International Honors Program and offers a course on early or medieval Christianity in Rome where students travel to Assisi, Orvieto, and Ostia Antica. His current research focuses on the origins of social welfare in the sixteenth century and the use of the visual arts to promote reform.

Torvend served as an Associate Priest and later interim Priest in Charge at St. Paul's Episcopal Church in Seattle, Washington.

== Education ==
Ph.D., Historical Theology, St. Louis University, St. Louis, 1990

M.A., Theology, Aquinas Institute of Theology, Dubuque, Iowa, 1980

M.Div., Wartburg Theological Seminary, Dubuque, Iowa, 1978

B.A., History, Pacific Lutheran University, 1973

== Books ==
He is the author of Daily Bread, Holy Meal: Opening the Gifts of Holy Communion. This work uses biblical and historical studies to examine the Lord's supper and its ecological, theological, communal and ethical dimensions of it.

Torvend wrote Flowing Water, Uncommon Birth: Christian Baptism in a Post-Christian Culture about the layered meanings of baptism in the modern context.

Torvend is the author of Luther and the Hungry Poor: Gathered Fragments, an examination of the early Reformation church's to the poor, hunger and the hungry poor, specifically Martin Luther.

Torvend's most recent publication is Still Hungry at the Feast: Eucharistic Justice in the Midst of Affliction (Liturgical Press, 2019) about the deeper relationship between the practice and mission of communion.
