= The Realm of the Rye (1950 film) =

1950 film

- Directed by: Ivar Johansson
- Written by: Jarl Hemmer (poem); Ivar Johansson
- Produced by: Rune Waldekranz
- Starring: Eric Laurent; Peter Lindgren; Nine-Christine Jönsson
- Cinematography: Sven Nykvist
- Edited by: Carl-Olov Skeppstedt
- Music by: Håkan von Eichwald
- Production company: Sandrews
- Distributed by: Sandrew-Baumanfilm
- Release date: 26 September 1950
- Running time: 87 minutes
- Country: Sweden
- Language: Swedish

The Realm of the Rye' (Swedish: Rågens rike) is a 1950 Swedish drama film directed by Ivar Johansson and starring Eric Laurent, Peter Lindgren and Nine-Christine Jönsson.

It was shot at the Centrumateljéerna Studios in Stockholm. The film's sets were designed by the art director P.A. Lundgren. It is a remake of the 1929 silent film of the same name.

== Cast ==
- Eric Laurent as Mattias Larsson
- Peter Lindgren as Markus
- Nine-Christine Jönsson as Klara Torkelsdotter
- Linnéa Hillberg as Klara's Mother
- Wilma Malmlöf as Hilda
- Sten Lindgren as Gusten
- Erik Sundqvist as Jan
- Rune Ottoson as Lill-Matt
- Alf Östlund as Josua Larsson
- Arthur Fischer as Parish constable
- Ivar Hallbäck as Kalle
- Knut Lindroth as Reverend
- Lissi Alandh as Hildur
- Martin Ljung as Olle
- Torgny Anderberg as Kors-Petter

== Bibliography ==
- Qvist, Per Olov & von Bagh, Peter. Guide to the Cinema of Sweden and Finland. Greenwood Publishing Group, 2000.
