= The Realm of the Rye (1929 film) =

1929 film

- Directed by: Ivar Johansson
- Written by: Jarl Hemmer (poem); Ivar Johansson
- Produced by: Maja Engelbrekston
- Starring: Mathias Taube; Margit Manstad; Eric Laurent
- Cinematography: Carl Halling
- Production company: Tellus Film
- Distributed by: Fribergs Filmbyrå
- Release date: 1 January 1929
- Running time: 128 minutes
- Country: Sweden
- Language: Silent film

The Realm of the Rye (Swedish: Rågens rike) is a 1929 Swedish black-and-white silent film directed by Ivar Johansson and starring Mathias Taube, Margit Manstad and Eric Laurent. The film's sets were designed by the art director Vilhelm Bryde. It was remade into a 1950 film The Realm of the Rye, also directed by Johansson.

== Cast ==
- Mathias Taube as Mattias Spangar
- Eric Laurent as Markus
- Märtha Lindlöf as Widow
- Margit Manstad as Klara
- Artur Cederborgh as Prophet
- Gustav Runsten as Farmhand
- Axel Slangus as Kniv-Pekka
- Gösta Ericsson as Ante
- Solveig Hedengran as Stina
- Lizzie Nyström as Old Maid
- Sven Bergvall as Gusten
- Wictor Hagman as Jan
- Hilda Borgström as Bonfgumma
- Helga Brofeldt as Maid
- Hilda Castegren as Old Countrywoman
- Julia Cæsar as Maid
- Tyra Dörum as Old Countrywoman
- Signe Enwall as Maid
- Knut Frankman as Neighbour
- Gustaf Gjerdrum as Priest
- Gunhild Robertson as Old Countrywoman
- Edla Rothgardt as Old Countrywoman

== Bibliography ==
- Qvist, Per Olov & von Bagh, Peter. Guide to the Cinema of Sweden and Finland. Greenwood Publishing Group, 2000.
