= Maria Johansson =

Swedish actress

Maria Johannson
- Born: Maria Gunilla Johansson Tavle; 7 April 1956 (age 69); Stockholm, Sweden
- Occupations: Actress; professor
- Years active: 1964–1998

Maria Gunilla Johansson Tovle (born 7 April 1956 in Stockholm) is a Swedish actress, film director and professor at the Stockholm Academy of Dramatic Arts.

In 1963, at the age of 6, Johansson auditioned for the part of "Tjorven" in the TV series Vi på Saltkråkan written by Astrid Lindgren, and was accepted. She played Tjorven in the series as well as in four subsequent full-length movies produced in 1964–1967.

Johansson studied at the Swedish National Academy of Mime and Acting until 1981. She worked as a film, TV, and theatre actress until 1998, when she started working as a director. She became interested in research on acting, and received a master's degree and a PhD at Södertörn University. Her PhD thesis from 2012 is called Skådespelarens praktiska kunskap (The actor's practical knowledge).

She is Professor of Research in the Arts at the Stockholm Academy of Dramatic Arts. She has two sons.

== Selected filmography ==
- 1981 - Operation Leo
- 1981 - Tuppen
- 1981 - The Simple-Minded Murder
- 1987 - Daghemmet Lyckan (TV)
- 1988 - Liv i luckan (TV)
- 1996 - Juloratoriet
- 1998 - Skärgårdsdoktorn (TV)
