= Sten-Åke Cederhök =

Swedish actor and comedian

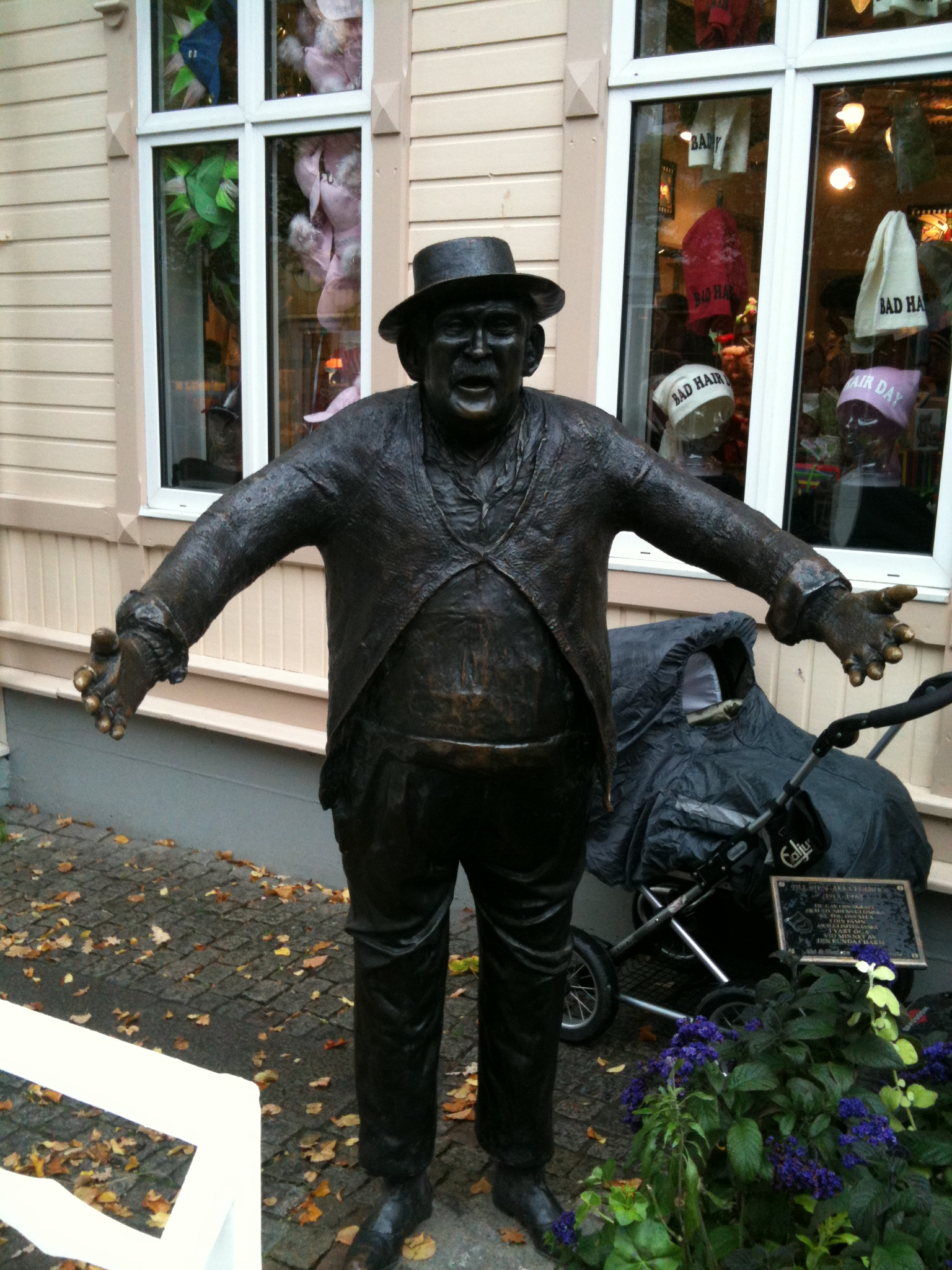
- Statue of Cederhök at Liseberg in Gothenburg
- Born: 30 January 1913; Gislaved, Sweden
- Died: 14 January 1990 (aged 76); Sweden
- Occupations: Actor, comedian, screenwriter

Sten-Åke Cederhök (born Carlsson; 30 January 1913 – 14 January 1990) was a Swedish actor, comedian, and singer. Known for his Gothenburg dialect and collaborations with Sonya Hedenbratt, Cederhök is regarded as one of Sweden’s most beloved folk entertainers of the 20th century.

Cederhök was born in Gislaved but grew mainly up in Gothenburg. For much of his career he wrote and acted in popular revues while holding down regular jobs. Early on he became widely known around Gothenburg, but television made him more famous from the 1960s on. His most memorable television role was in Albert & Herbert, which ran from 1974 to 1979 and reappeared as a special Christmas series in 1982.

He was an ardent supporter of the football team GAIS.

== See also ==
- Albert & Herbert
