= Bendjelloul =

Bendjelloul is a surname. Notable people with the surname include:

- Johar Bendjelloul (born 1975), Swedish journalist and radio broadcaster
- Malik Bendjelloul (1977–2014), Swedish documentary filmmaker and former child actor
- Veronica Schildt Bendjelloul (born 1944), Swedish translator and mother of Johar and Malik Bendjelloul above
