= Malik Bendjelloul =

Swedish film and documentary director (1977-2014)

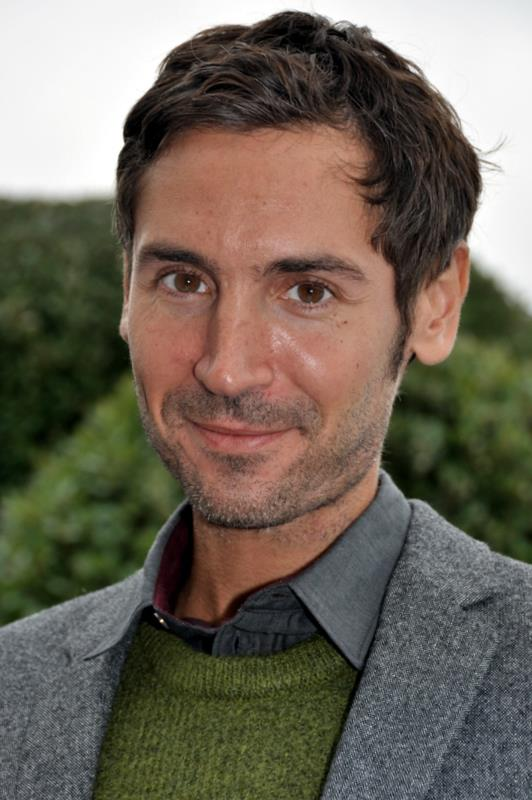
- Bendjelloul at the 2012 Deauville American Film Festival
- Born: 14 September 1977; Ystad, Skåne, Sweden
- Died: 13 May 2014 (aged 36); Solna, Stockholm, Sweden
- Occupations: Film director, actor, screenwriter, journalist
- Years active: 1990–2014
- Known for: Searching for Sugar Man (2012)

Malik Bendjelloul (14 September 1977 – 13 May 2014) was a Swedish documentary filmmaker, journalist and actor. He directed the 2012 documentary Searching for Sugar Man, which won an Academy Award and a BAFTA Award.

== Early life ==
Bendjelloul was born in Ystad in Sweden, 55 kilometres (34 mi) east of Malmö, the son of Algerian-born physician Hacène Bendjelloul and Swedish translator and painter Veronica Schildt Bendjelloul. He was the brother of journalist Johar Bendjelloul and the nephew of actors Peter and Johan Schildt. Bendjelloul grew up in central and southern Sweden (Ängelholm) and during the 1990s acted in the SVT TV series Ebba och Didrik as Philip Clavelle. The episodes were directed by his uncle, Peter Schildt. Bendjelloul was educated at the Rönne Gymnasium in Ängelholm, where he entered the social science programme. He graduated in 1996. He then attended Kalmar University, where he studied journalism and media production.

== Career ==
Bendjelloul started his television career as a reporter on Swedish public television (SVT), where he worked as a freelancer and journalist for Kobra. Prior to working for SVT, he also worked for an independent production company, Barracuda Film & TV. Subsequently, he left the job to direct documentaries on musicians including Elton John, Rod Stewart, Björk and Kraftwerk.

Bendjelloul's documentary Searching for Sugar Man won the 2013 Academy Award for Best Documentary Feature. Bendjelloul also won the 2013 BAFTA Award, Directors Guild of America, Producers Guild of America, Writers Guild of America, American Cinema Editors, the Sundance audience and special jury accolades and the 2012 International Documentary Association awards. Eventually, the documentary achieved commercial success as well and made $3.6 million (£2.7 million) at the box office. The film documents the revival of Sixto Rodriguez's musical career.

In 2013, Bendjelloul was invited to host a show on the Swedish radio show Sommar i P1, where he told the listeners about the process behind Searching for Sugar Man.

== Death ==
At rush hour on 13 May 2014, Malik Bendjelloul died by suicide when he jumped in front of an oncoming train at the Solna centrum metro station in Stockholm after struggling with depression, as reported by his brother Johar. At the time of his death, he was working on a film project based on Lawrence Anthony's book The Elephant Whisperer.

== Filmography ==
- Ebba och Didrik (1990) (actor)
- Searching for Sugar Man (2012) (director)
