= An Elephant in My Kitchen =

2018 book

An Elephant in my Kitchen
- Author: Francoise Malby-Anthony with Katja Willemsen
- Language: English
- Genre: Non-fiction
- Publisher: Pan Macmillan (London)
- Publication date: 2018
- Pages: 324 pp.
- ISBN: 978-1-5098-6491-1

An Elephant in my Kitchen, published in July 2018 by Pan Macmillan in London, is the first book written by South African author and conservationist Françoise Malby-Anthony along with author Katja Willemsen.

The story is told out of the eyes of Françoise Malby-Anthony who continued to manage Thula Thula Private Game Reserve in KwaZulu Natal South Africa after Lawrence Anthony's death in 2012, and is considered the sequel of The Elephant Whisperer, published by Lawrence Anthony in 2009.

The book was the number one bestseller in South Africa for a number of weeks in 2018, and has been launched in the UK, Australia, New Zealand and India. The book launched in Canada and the United States in November 2018.
