= 2009 swine flu pandemic actions concerning pigs =

In reaction to the 2009 flu pandemic, governments around the world had responded with countermeasures, some with extreme actions against pigs, which included the official extermination of all domestic pigs in Egypt and the culling of three wild boars at the Baghdad Zoo in Iraq. Many of these slaughters occurred in Muslim countries, and religious restrictions on the consumption of pork have been cited as influencing the decision to take such action. Many other countries had also banned international trade in pigs and pork products.

The World Health Organization (WHO) has stated that there is no reason to believe that pigs are transmitting the flu to humans.

On May 2, the first incident of transmission from humans to pigs was discovered on a farm in Alberta, where infected pigs were discovered. It is suspected that an infected farmhand who recently returned from Mexico infected the animals.

== General responses ==
=== Virus source ===
According to researchers cited by The New York Times, "based on its genetic structure, the new virus is without question a type of swine influenza, derived originally from a strain that lived in pigs". This origin gave rise to the nomenclature "swine flu", largely used by mass media in the first days of the epidemic. Despite this origin, the current strain is a human-to-human transmitted virus, requiring no contact with swine.

=== Food safety and import bans ===
International health officials from the CDC, WHO, FAO, OIE and other food organizations have reaffirmed that pork is safe to eat and hogs are not to blame for the epidemic. However, as of early June, China, Russia and more than a dozen other countries were still banning pork imports from the U.S. The World Trade Organization (WTO) planned to highlight the pork bans in a forthcoming report on protectionism and reiterate that pork is not a source of infection and is safe to eat provided it is prepared properly. Some U.S. officials speculated that the bans may be more about "market share than health concerns," and were costing the hog industry millions of dollars every week. Dave Warner, a spokesman for the Washington-based National Pork Producers Council, pointed out that long-standing disagreements with China and Russia may be a factor.

As a result, by mid-August, pork had become the second-worst commodity investment of 2009, and may fall 33 percent by yearend. U.S. exports plunged 20 percent in the first half of 2009 and are heading for the first annual decline since 1990. Tyson Foods Inc. idled slaughterhouses, and U.S. hog farmers haven't been profitable in a year. Imports from the U.S. fell 38 percent in Russia this year and 73 percent in China, including Hong Kong, USDA data show.

=== Surveillance of pig populations ===
At the beginning of June 2009, the U.S. Agriculture Department said it would launch a pilot surveillance project to look for new strains of flu virus in pigs. Some experts claim that global health officials have underestimated the risk that pig herds might be a source of new influenza strains, choosing instead to focus on the threat of bird flu. Until recently, health experts have done very little surveillance of influenza among pigs—even though the virus is very common in the animals and just as transmissible as it is among people. Flu viruses have also been shown to pass from pigs to people and from people to pigs.

== Responses by country ==
=== Afghanistan ===
As reported by The Daily Telegraph, Afghanistan's only pig has been taken off display in the Kabul Zoo and "quarantined" as a response to visitor's fears about contracting swine flu.

=== Argentina ===
Zoonosis in Argentina

A case of human-to-swine transmission was discovered in Buenos Aires province, on June 25. The hog farm where it occurred has been interdicted.

=== Canada ===
Zoonosis in Canada: Human-to-animal Animal-to-human Both human-to-animal and animal-to-human

On May 2, Canadian Food Inspection Agency executive vice-president Brian Evans announced that an infected Alberta farm worker recently returned from Mexico had apparently passed the virus to a swine herd in his care. Although the herd had been quarantined, Evans stressed that the infection represented no threat to food safety and judged the possibility of infected pigs passing the virus back to humans "remote". Evans said the infection of the herd was the first known case of the H1N1 virus being transmitted from humans to pigs.

In Canada in early June, an Alberta pig farmer whose herd was infected with the new swine flu virus culled his entire herd. In May he had already culled 500 animals from his herd. The farm owner said the animals cannot be marketed because they are under quarantine and he is facing a problem with overcrowding.

Transmission from the same herd of pigs back to humans was revealed on 20 July, though it occurred on 7 May when the humans, animal health inspectors, were taking samples from the infected herd with improper self-protective measures.

=== China ===
The People's Republic of China has banned pork imports. In response to the 2009 H1Ni pandemic, China did not cull their pig population, but instead the government focused on containment and bans to limit infections. They analyzed the virus by taking bronchial swabs and blood serums of pigs in the Guanxi Province in 2011. China had increased their surveillance in their pig populations because they conducted a study using pigs' blood and found that there is a risk of catching the virus in their pig populations.

=== Egypt ===
On 29 April 2009, the Egyptian Government announced the decision to slaughter all pigs in the country, roughly 300,000, despite a lack of evidence that the pigs had, or were even suspected of having, the virus. This decision reportedly raised religious tensions since pig owners are mostly in the Coptic Christian minority (5% to 10% of the population) in the predominantly Islamic nation. Egyptian human rights lawyer Nadia Tawfiq claimed that the pig extermination was a form of attack on Christians. Many international newspapers attributed the action to the global swine-flu outbreak, even though no cases of swine flu had been reported in the country.

According to the Egyptian Ministry of Health (MOH) the extermination was not based on either the swine flu outbreak, nor it is against a specific group of citizens. On the Elkahira Elyoum TV show, Dr. Hatem El-Gabaly announced the pig extermination was based on the fear that the bird flu could mutate in the unkempt pig herds. The decision was reached because so many of the areas used by pig growers are specifically trash dumps and do not follow any veterinary supervision, unlike most other countries that raise pigs in a tested and controlled environment. The extra attention and urgency by the emergence of the bird flu, then the swine flu, provided an opportunity to act on a plan that had been there for several years. Josep Domènech, the chief veterinary officer at the U.N. Food and Agriculture Organization (FAO) called the decision "a real mistake", saying that FAO had been trying to reach Egyptian officials but there has been no response.

Egypt commenced the slaughter on 2 May 2009. This led to clashes between pig owners and the police in Cairo. On the next day in Cairo, an estimated 300 Coptic Christian residents of the Manshiyat Nasr district set up blockades on the street in attempt to keep government officers from confiscating their pigs, which led to clashes with the police. Al-Ahram, a widely circulated Egyptian newspaper, reported that owners of destroyed pigs will receive £E1,000 (approximately US$177.70) per animal in compensation, but Reuters reported that the issue was still "under discussion", citing an Egyptian cabinet spokesman.

On June 5, the UK-based Compassion in World Farming organization warned Egypt that its brutal measures and its mass slaughter of pigs could negatively affect Egypt's tourism industry. Philip Lymbery the chief executive of the group was quoted saying that "Britons and people from around the world have joined the international storm of protest against this atrocity in Egypt, with many saying they'll no longer consider Egypt as a possible holiday destination,"

=== Indonesia ===
After a coordination meeting about the flu on April 27, 2009, the Indonesian government halted the importation of pigs and initiated the examination of 9 million pigs in Indonesia.

=== Iraq ===
Adel Salman Musa, the director of the Baghdad Zoo claims to have "received an order issued by the multi-ministry committee aimed at preventing swine flu" to kill Baghdad's supply of three wild boars. He said the cull was initiated "to break a barrier of fear" which had been developed amongst zoo visitors. There had been a decline in the number of visitors in the days prior to the culling.

The health ministry said that killing the pigs would serve no purpose in preventing an outbreak in the country that has no reported cases of swine flu. Ehassan Jafar, a spokesperson for the country's health ministry, said that "it does not matter" since the virus is able to transmit itself between humans now. In its dispute with the agriculture ministry, the health ministry said "if you really want to kill them then just kill them".

The boars were tested prior to their culling, and results proved negative. The zoo's director said they were killed humanely. This involved the use of an anesthetic. The three carcasses were later buried.

The deaths were relayed around the world via Agence France-Presse, CNN, Israel's Ynetnews and China's Xinhua News Agency.

==== Iraqi Kurdistan ====
Kurdistan's Regional Government has outlawed boar hunting. The area has a large population of wild boars.

Inhabitants are told to avoid the consumption of pork. Travelers are being monitored for their activity in relation to this.

=== Japan ===
The Ministry of Agriculture, Forestry and Fisheries of Japan instructed animal quarantine offices across the country to examine any live pigs being brought into the country to make sure they are not infected with the H1N1 strain of influenza. Japanese Agriculture Minister Shigeru Ishiba appeared on television to reassure consumers that it is safe to eat pork. The Japanese farm ministry said that it would not ask for restrictions on pork imports because the virus was unlikely to turn up in pork, and would be killed by cooking.

=== Macedonia ===
On April 27, 2009, the government of the Republic of Macedonia prohibited all exports and imports of live pigs.

=== North Korea ===
According to Daily NK, the sale of pork has been prohibited in a portion of the jangmadang because A/H1N1 is still sometimes called "swine flu"

No official decree has been issued by the state or any political entity, but some officials of the People's Safety Agency have been unilaterally preventing the sale of pork. In the Hyesan, Wiyeon and Masan Markets, it is still difficult to find pork.

=== Norway ===
500 pigs were mass slaughtered on October 16, after swine flu was detected on a farm in Nord-Trøndelag county the week before the slaughtering. Another 900 pigs from a second farm will also be slaughtered.

=== Philippines ===
The Philippines issued a ban on pig imports from countries affected by the disease. The ban was lifted on May 4 except imports from Canada because of authorities were still checking the possible transmission of the A(H1N1) from a human to a pig. The pig import ban from Canada was lifted on May 11.

=== Russia ===
The Russian Federation has banned pork import. During the H1N1 pandemic, Russia restricted trade and imposed a ban on all meat products, including pork from places such as the state of Wisconsin in the United States, the Caribbeans, Central America, as well as Mexico. They had also disallowed meat to be carried onboard flights, whether that be cooked or raw products.

=== Ukraine ===
Imports of pork and live pigs from all affected countries have been banned. The ban also applies to all shipments after April 21.

=== India ===
When the 2009 H1N1 pandemic occurred, the Indian government ordered the removal of pigs from human settlements. Local municipal bodies were given the authority to determine how these removals were done. One of these bodies was the Chennai Corporation, which ordered to culling of stray and reared pigs. To implement this, a 25-member team was formed. The corporation had culled at least 150 pigs. Rajesh Lakhoni, who was the Corporation Commissioner, stated that the actions taken were as a response to the ban on pig rearing within residential areas rather than doing so because of the virus.

== By region ==
=== Arab countries ===
As of June 2009 it was reported that Flu will halt import of pigs by Arab countries, but they ban exporting porks to America.
