= Veronica Schildt Bendjelloul =

Swedish translator

- Born: May 20, 1944 (age 81); Stockholm, Sweden
- Occupation: Translator

Pia Veronica Schildt Bendjelloul (born 20 May 1944, in Stockholm) is a Swedish translator.

Born Veronica Schildt, she belonged to the Finnish Assembly (Finska församlingen, a non-territorial assembly in Swedish church primarily serving Sweden Finns in the Stockholm diocese). she finished her matriculation in a school for girls in Stockholm in 1964, and later studied at Stockholm University receiving a Bachelor of Arts in 1971.

== Personal life ==
She worked as a translator, translating notably the comics series Isabelle and Lucky Luke to Swedish. She also translated literary books like Agatha Christie mysteries.

Veronica Schildt comes from an artistic family background. Her father Henrik Schildt and her uncle Jurgen Schildt as well as her brother Peter Schildt, and half-brother Johan Schildt were established names in theater, film and television.

She took the name of Bendjelloul after marrying Hacène Bendjelloul, an Algerian-born chief physician at the hospital in Helsingborg hospital. The couple had two children, Johar Bendjelloul born in 1975 who became a well-known Swedish television presenter and journalist and Malik Bendjelloul born in 1977, and an Oscar-winning filmmaker for Searching for Sugar Man. Malik committed suicide on 13 May 2014 after struggling with depression.
