= Tusen gånger starkare =

2006 novel by Christina Herrström

- Author: Christina Herrström
- Language: Swedish
- Publisher: Bonnier Carlsen
- Publication date: 2006
- Publication place: Sweden
- Pages: 217 pp.
- ISBN: 9789163852503

Tusen gånger starkare (A Thousand Times Stronger) is a 2006 young adult novel written by Swedish author Christina Herrström. It was nominated to the August Prize the same year.

== Plot ==
The book is about the power between the two sexes (boys and girls).

In the 15-year-old girl Signe's class the "bad" boys and the popular girl Mimi have much power. When a new girl, Saga, comes to the class, the situation is changed; she breaks the "rules" for showing how girls should act. At first the teachers like her actions but when the other girls follow her advice, the situation becomes chaotic.

== Film ==
In 2010 a film based on the book was produced.
