= Pride of Baghdad =

Graphic novel written by Brian K. Vaughan

- Cover to Pride of Baghdad

Publication information
- Publisher: Vertigo
- Publication date: September 13, 2006

Creative team
- Written by: Brian K. Vaughan
- Artist: Niko Henrichon
- Letterer: Todd Klein
- Editor(s): Will Dennis; Casey Seijas

Pride of Baghdad is a graphic novel written by Brian K. Vaughan and illustrated by Niko Henrichon released by DC Comics' Vertigo imprint on September 13, 2006. The story is a fictionalized account of the true story of four lions that escaped from the Baghdad Zoo after an American bombing in 2003. The book won the IGN award for best original graphic novel in 2006.

== Plot ==
The story revolves around the brief freedom experienced by a small pride of captive lions, who escape from Baghdad Zoo during the 2003 invasion of Baghdad by the U.S.-led coalition. As the lions roam the streets of Baghdad trying to survive, each lion comes to embody a different viewpoint regarding the Iraq War.

== Production ==
Speaking on the decision to publish Pride of Baghdad as a single volume rather than the more common serial form, Vaughan commented: "I wanted readers to experience the suddenness with which these animals' lives were changed and that worked much better in a story that can be read in one sitting...the learning curve for writing a 136-page self-contained novel was steep, but I'm thrilled with how it turned out".

== Characters ==
=== Main characters ===
- Zill is the alpha male (and only adult male) of the pride. Though usually mild-mannered, he begins to show signs of aggression and proves to be a competent fighter.
- Safa is an old lioness who is blind in one eye and has a torn ear. She has become accustomed to captivity and views the human advantage of their new freedom. It is implied that she once used to be Zill's mate.
- Noor is a younger lioness, mother to Ali, and Zill's current mate. She longs for freedom from the zoo. She and Safa rarely agree, and they often fight verbally.
- Ali is Noor's young cub.

=== Secondary characters ===
- Bukk is a lion from Safa's past.
- Bukk's brothers appear in Safa's memory about her past.
- An unnamed sea turtle who speaks with Safa and Ali about Gulf War.
- Fajer is a blood-thirsty bear who challenges the group.
- Rashid is a tortured pet lion on the verge of death. While never stated in the story, it is likely that Rashid belonged to Saddam Hussein's son Uday, who was known for keeping lions as pets.

== Reception ==
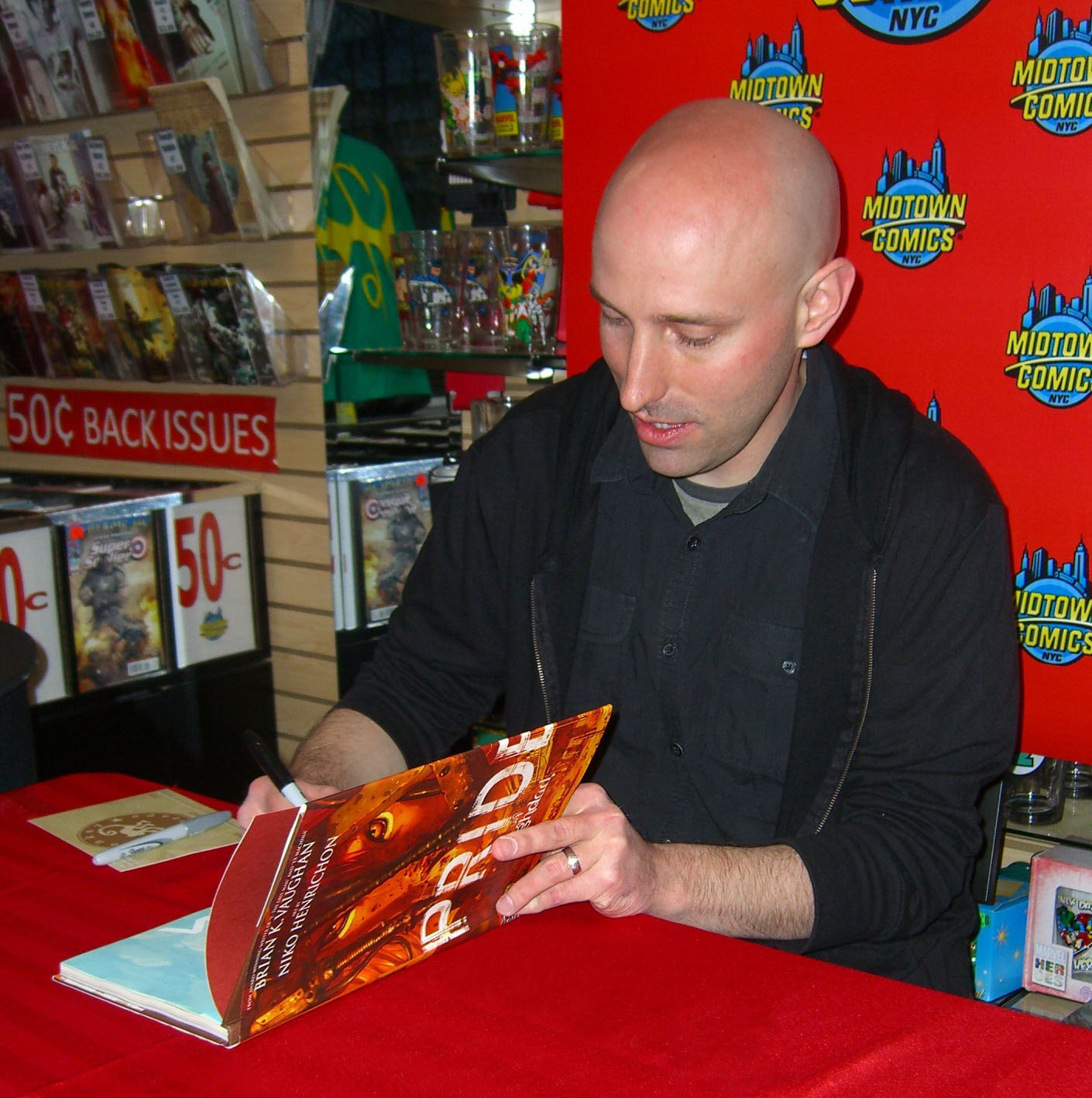
Writer Brian K. Vaughan signing a copy of the book at Midtown Comics in Manhattan.

IGN named Pride of Baghdad the Best Original Graphic Novel of 2006, calling it a "modern classic", and commenting that the book "can be enjoyed on several levels. Those wanting a 'simple' tale of survival and family will find that. Those wanting a powerful, gripping analogy of war will find that as well. Writer Brian K. Vaughan was also careful to avoid pinpointing any one particular viewpoint—each lion represents a different attitude, which is refreshing since many books do not allow that choice. Featuring stunning artwork by Niko Henrichon, there is no way any comic book reader should pass up this graphic novel". Dorkgasm described it as "one of the most poignant anthropomorphic stories since Animal Farm". The book was listed in the ALA's Great Graphic Novels for Teens Top Ten in 2007 and Booklist Editors' Choice: Adult Books for Young Adults.

== See also ==
- Babylon's Ark
- Bengal Tiger at the Baghdad Zoo
- Iraqi lion
- Lions in literature
