= Al-Zawraa Park =

Park in Baghdad, Iraq

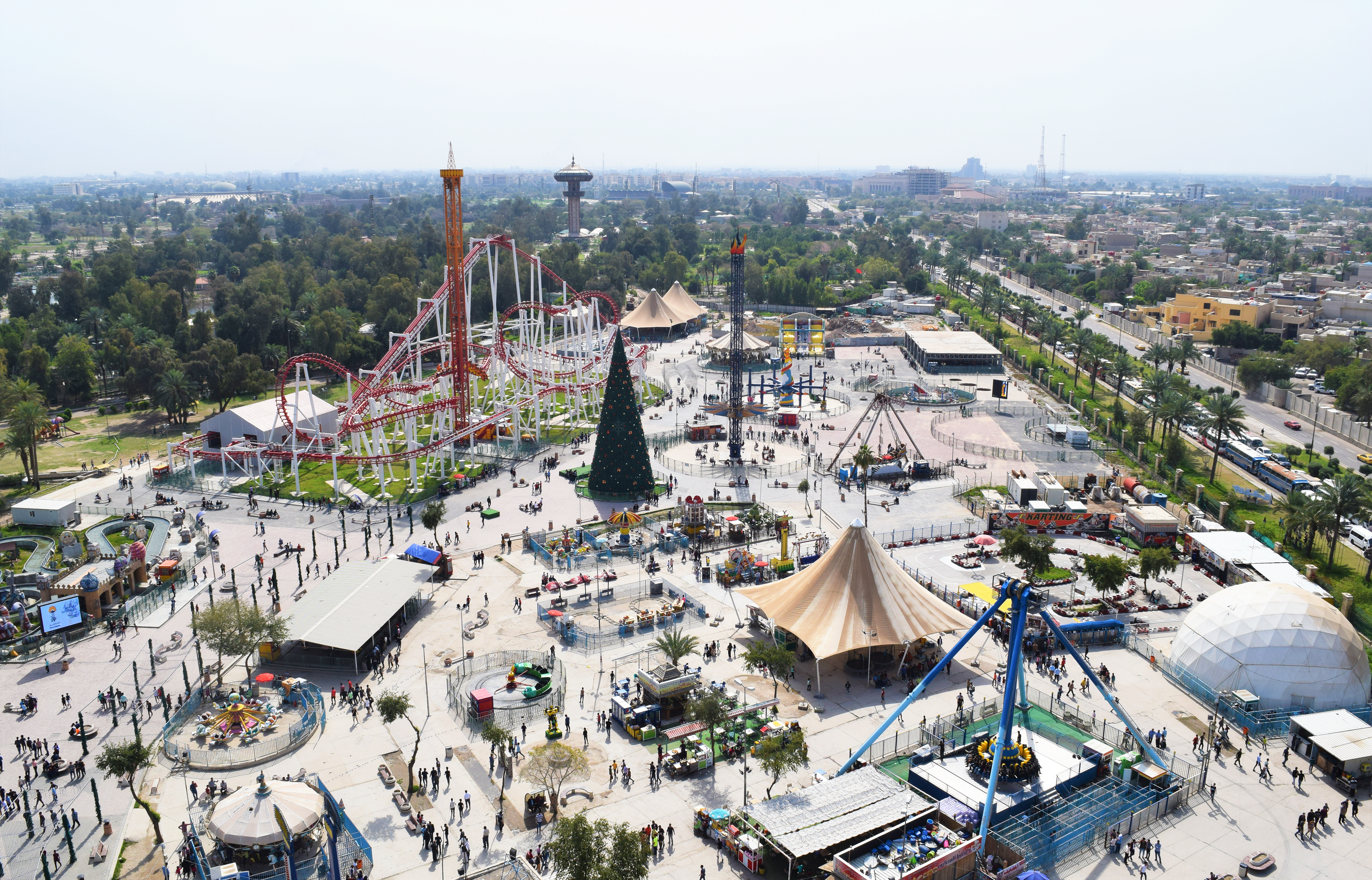
- Interactive map of Al-Zawraa Park
- Location: Baghdad, Iraq
- Coordinates: 33.314845°N 44.376417°E

Al-Zawraa Park or Al-Zawraa Garden is a public park located in Baghdad, Iraq. Established in the early 1970s, the 3-square kilometer area was previously an army camp until it was converted into a park. It contains an amusement park and a tower. It also includes a zoo, which was severely damaged during the 2003 invasion of Iraq. The park also hosts Iraq's International Flower Festival.

It includes an amusement park and a high tower (Al-Zawraa Tower). It also includes the zoo, which was severely damaged during the American invasion of Iraq in 2003, especially after American tanks invaded it with the aim of destroying a statue of former Iraqi President Saddam Hussein that was erected near the park. It also lost a large number of its animals in the zoo inside it. Al-Zawraa Park has been rehabilitated and is now more beautiful than before. Iraqi families in general and Baghdad families in particular have returned to spend enjoyable times there and eat popular foods. Al-Zawraa Park witnesses a large turnout during weekends, holidays, occasions and festivals, including the Baghdad International Flower Festival, which is held in the gardens of Al-Zawraa Park.

Image gallery
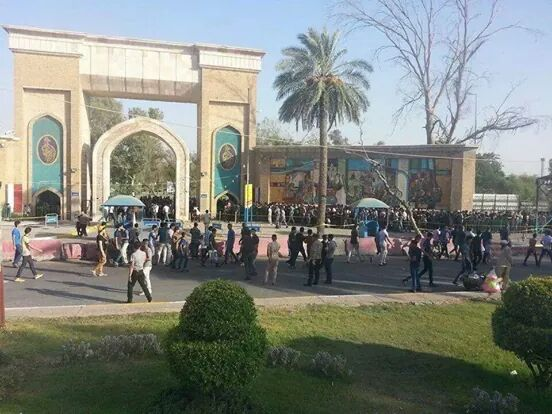

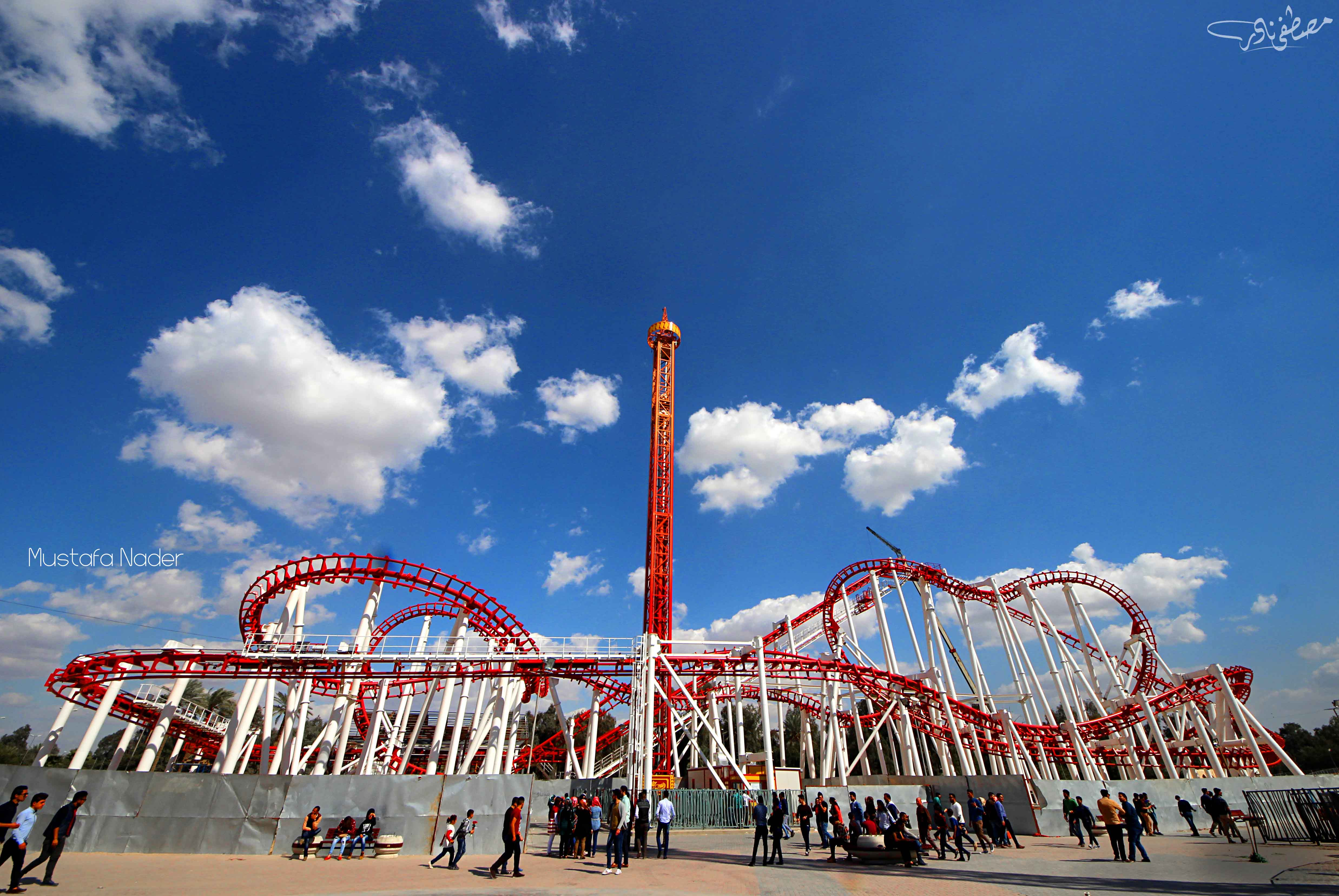

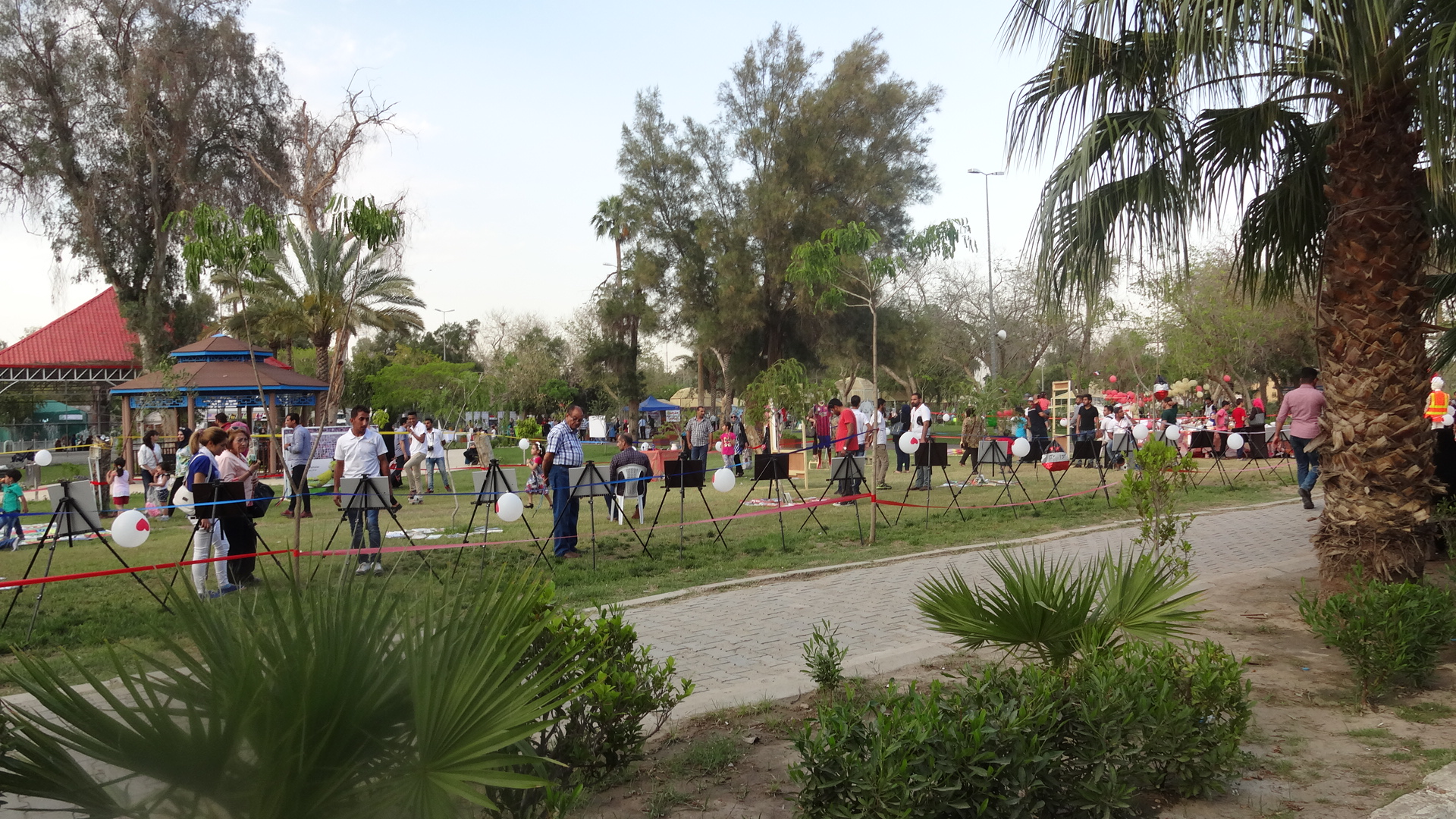

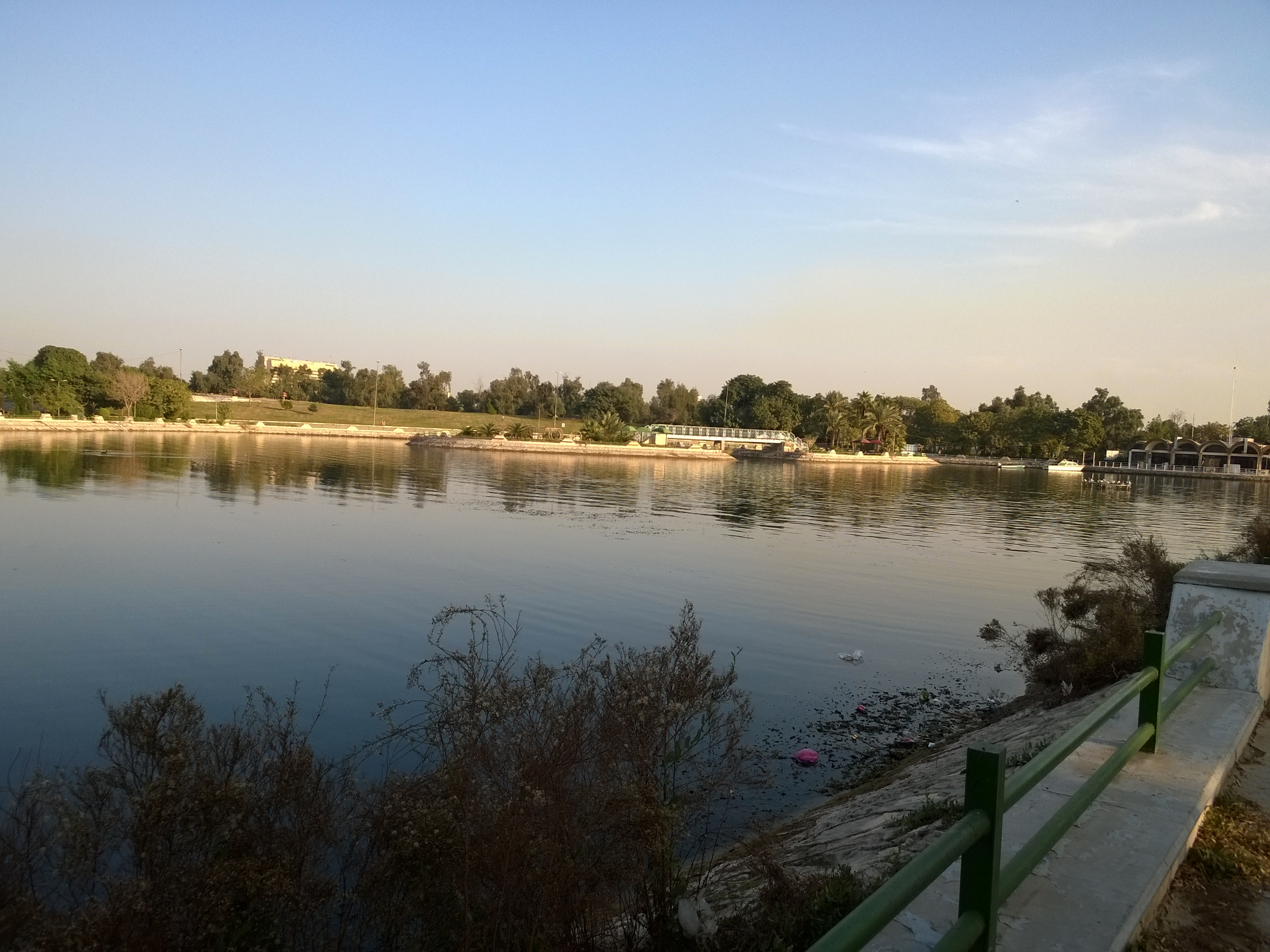
