= Distant Land =

- Screenplay by: Niklas Holmgren and Anders Hazelius
- Directed by: Niklas Holmgren and Anders Hazelius
- Starring: Jonatan Blode, Liv Enqvist, Joakim Jurell, Adam Lundgren, Joel Lützow, Franciska Löfgren, Ulla-Britt Norrman, Camilla Nyberg Waller, Peter Schildt, Emma Swenninger, Annika Wallin Öberg
- Country of origin: Sweden
- Original language: Swedish

Original release
- Release: 2010

Distant Land (Swedish: Främmande land) is a 2010 television film directed by Niklas Holmgren and Anders Hazelius. The screen play is also written by Niklas Holmgren and Anders Hazelius. The film takes place on Fårö, an island north of Gotland in the Baltic Sea, in Sweden. Principal photography took place on Fårö and in a studio in Fårösund, Sweden. Fårö is the island where several of Ingmar Bergmans most noted motion pictures were filmed. The film was shot during August, 2008. The film premiered in 2010 in Sweden.

== Plot ==
The film picture two women's sojourn at Fårö. Elisabeth is fleeing from her life in Stockholm because of a family tragedy, to take care of a cabin village. She finds a 13-year-old boy on the beach whom she hides in her house. The actress Cecilia is with a film crew on the island. She mismanage her work and jeopardize her part. She meets 17-year-old Christoffer who turns everything upside down. On the island both women are confronted with their lives and have to face difficult choices.

== Cast ==
- Jonatan Blode
- Liv Enqvist
- Joakim Jurell
- Adam Lundgren
- Joel Lützow
- Franciska Löfgren
- Ulla-Britt Norrman
- Camilla Nyberg Waller
- Peter Schildt
- Emma Swenninger
- Annika Wallin Öberg
