= Niko Henrichon =

Canadian comic book writer/artist

- Occupation: artist

Niko Henrichon is a Canadian comic book writer/artist. He is best known his work with writer Brian K. Vaughan in creating the graphic novel Pride of Baghdad. Henrichon's first major work was a graphic novel titled Barnum!, written by Howard Chaykin and David Tischman, but he also did work for Fables, New X-Men, Sandman, and Spider-Man. He regularly provides covers for Marvel Comics and DC Comics on series like Fantastic Four and X-Men.
