= Bengal Tiger at the Baghdad Zoo =

2009 play by Rajiv Joseph

- Broadway poster
- Written by: Rajiv Joseph
- Setting: 2003 Baghdad, during the Iraq War

Premiere
- Date: May 10, 2009
- Place: Kirk Douglas Theatre; Los Angeles, California

Bengal Tiger at the Baghdad Zoo is a play by Rajiv Joseph. The show is about "a tiger that haunts the streets of present-day Baghdad seeking the meaning of life. As he witnesses the puzzling absurdities of war, the tiger encounters Americans and Iraqis who are searching for friendship, redemption, and a toilet seat made of gold."

The back of the book gives a synopsis: "The lives of two American Marines and an Iraqi translator are forever changed by an encounter with a quick-witted tiger who haunts the streets of war-torn Baghdad attempting to find meaning, forgiveness and redemption amidst the city's ruins. Rajiv Joseph's groundbreaking play exposes both the power and peril of human nature."

== Synopsis ==
A Bengal tiger lives in Baghdad Zoo. He tells the audience that most of the animals have fled to "freedom" because of the Iraq invasion, only to be shot dead by soldiers. That night, United States soldiers come to guard the zoo. Two soldiers are stationed in front of the tiger's den. One soldier, Tom, teases the tiger with food. The tiger, driven by fear and hunger, bites off Tom's hand. Kev, another soldier, shoots the tiger, mortally wounding him. The tiger slowly dies.

Kev finds himself haunted by the ghost of the tiger, who wanders about Baghdad. Due to an outburst while searching an Iraqi's home, Kev is sent to the hospital. Kev has seen the tiger's ghost and in turn people think he is going crazy. Back in Baghdad with a prosthetic hand, Tom pays a visit to Kev, less out of compassion for a broken-minded buddy than for a more practical purpose.

It is revealed that the gold-plated gun Tom was showing Kev when the tiger bit Tom's hand off was taken from the palace of the late Uday Hussein, the son of overthrown Iraqi dictator Saddam Hussein. Tom contacted Kev after he got his hand fixed because he wants the gold gun back. He can start a new life in the United States by selling not only the gold-plated gun, but also a solid gold toilet seat that was also Uday Hussein's. However, during Kev's episode in the home in Iraq when he saw the tiger's ghost, Kev dropped the gun and it fell into the hands of Uday's former gardener, Musa. Musa is also working as a translator for the United States soldiers. Musa is visited repeatedly by Uday's ghost. This is why Kev can't give Tom the gold gun back even if he wanted to.

Kev continues to see the tiger's ghost and he believes that the tiger is haunting him because of his previous actions. Kev tries to cut off his own hand to give to the tiger, believing this action will make the tiger's ghost go away. Instead, Kev ends up killing himself while trying to cut his hand off. He then ends up haunting Tom throughout the rest of the story.

The rest of the play goes on with the ghosts of the dead characters haunting and talking to the characters who are still alive.

== Productions ==
The play debuted at the Kirk Douglas Theatre in Culver City, California, directed by Moisés Kaufman. It ran from May 10, 2009, to June 7, 2009. The creative team included sets by Derek McLane, costumes by David Zinn, and lighting by David Lander. Another production ran at the Mark Taper Forum in Los Angeles from April 14, 2010, to May 30, 2010. Kevin Tighe starred as the Tiger.

A Broadway production opened at the Richard Rodgers Theatre on March 31, 2011, following previews from March 11. The show played a "strictly limited" engagement until July 3, 2011. Again directed by Kaufman, the Broadway cast featured Robin Williams in the title role, with Glenn Davis as Tom, Brad Fleischer as Kev, Hrach Titizian as Uday, Sheila Vand as Hadia, Necar Zadegan as Leper, and Arian Moayed as Musa. Robyn Goodman, Kevin McCollum, and Jeffrey Seller produced this production along with the Center Theatre Group. The New York Times estimated that Bengal Tiger was expected to cost at least $3 million. The production marked Williams' final Broadway appearance and his only performance in a play on Broadway before his death in 2014. He had previously appeared on Broadway in a stand-up comedy engagement.

Bengal Tiger had its southeast regional premiere at Carolina Actors Studio Theatre in Charlotte, North Carolina on October 11, 2012. In San Francisco the play premiered at San Francisco Playhouse in October 2013 where it received rave reviews.

The play's European premiere took place at the Young Vic, London, on 4 December 2025, in a production running until 31 January 2026.

== Awards and nominations ==
Award	Outcome
2008 NEA Awards
Outstanding New American Play	Won
2010 Pulitzer Prize
Pulitzer Prize for Drama	Nominated
2011 Drama League Awards
Distinguished Production of a Play	Nominated
Distinguished Performance: Arian Moayed	Nominated
Distinguished Performance: Robin Williams	Nominated
2011 Outer Critics Circle Awards
Outstanding New Broadway Play	Nominated
Outstanding Set Design: Derek McLane	Nominated
Outstanding Lighting Design: David Lander	Nominated
2011 Easter Bonnet Competition
Outstanding Bonnet Design	Won
2011 Drama Desk Awards
Outstanding Play	Nominated
Outstanding Director of a Play: Moisés Kaufman	Nominated
Outstanding Music in a Play: Kathryn Bostic	Nominated
Outstanding Set Design in a Play: Derek McLane	Nominated
Outstanding Lighting Design in a Play: David Lander	Won
Outstanding Sound Design of a Play: Acme Sound Partners and Cricket S. Myers	Won
2011 Tony Awards
Best Performance by an Actor in a Featured Role in a Play: Arian Moayed	Nominated
Best Lighting Design of a Play: David Lander	Nominated
Best Sound Design of a Play: Acme Sound Partners and Cricket S. Myers	Nominated
2011 Broadway.com Audience Choice Awards
Favorite Play	Nominated
Favorite Actor in a Play: Robin Williams	Won

== Critical reception ==
In reviewing the Los Angeles production, Charles Isherwood in The New York Times wrote that the Tiger "isn't given any silly costuming, thank heavens, but simply wears tattered clothes" and saying that the show is "boldly imagined" and a "worthy finalist for the recent Pulitzer Prize".

The Broadway production received mixed to positive reviews. The Los Angeles Times called Bengal Tiger "the most original drama written about the Iraq War", but said, "Without an actor of Williams' marquee draw, 'Bengal Tiger' would likely not have made it to Broadway. Frankly, I'm a little surprised that it has . . . But I'm glad that it has found a home in the commercial theater district not only because the work will challenge mainstream theatergoers but because I think it will leave the more sensitive among them profoundly moved."

The Chicago Tribune praised the piece itself, but mentioned that Williams' performance "seems to miss much of the amoral ferocity of the beast (a tiger can be depressed or antic, but he is still a tiger). And a bigger problem yet is that Williams' Tiger is, as things go, not so much the protagonist as a sardonic observer of Baghdad ironies."

== See also ==
- Babylon's Ark
- The Bengal tiger in literature
- Pride of Baghdad
- Hungry Tiger
- Iraqi tiger
