= Baghdad Zoo =

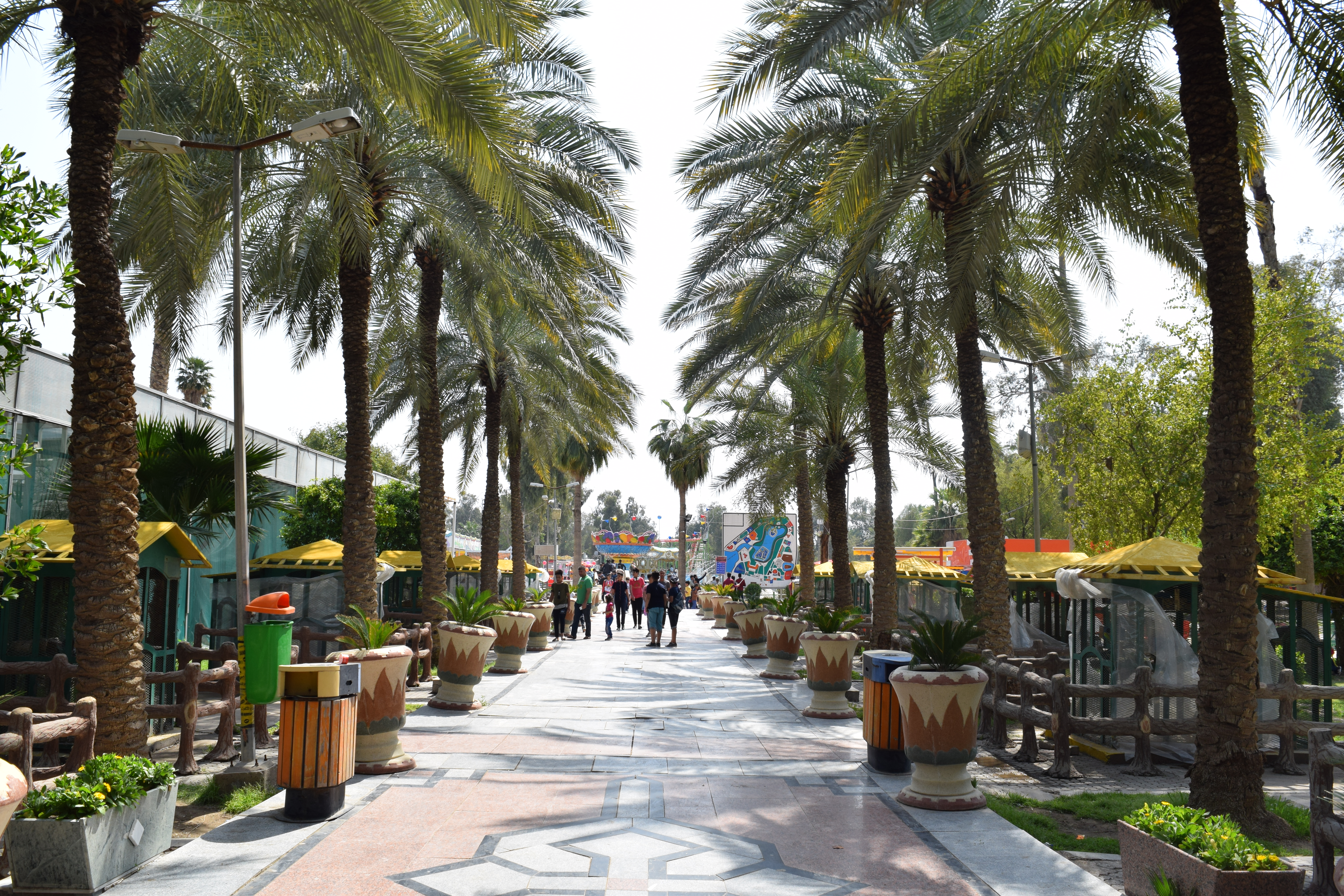
- Interactive map of Baghdad Zoo
- 33.314845°N 44.376417°E
- Date opened: 1971–2002; since 2003
- Location: Baghdad, Iraq
- Land area: 200 acres (81 ha)
- No. of animals: 1070 (2009)
- Annual visitors: 1,500,000 (2001); 120,000 (2007); 2,000,000 (2009)
- Website: http://www.baghdadzoo.org

The Baghdad Zoo is a 200-acre (81 ha) zoo originally opened in 1971 and located in Baghdad, Iraq, in the Al-Zawraa Park area along with the Al Zawra’a Dream Park (amusement park) and Zawra'a Tower. Before the 2003 invasion of Iraq, the zoo housed 650 animals. After being nearly destroyed during the 2003 Iraqi war, when only about 35 animals survived, the zoo was reopened in 2003 and now houses about 1,070 animals.

== History ==
=== Early history ===
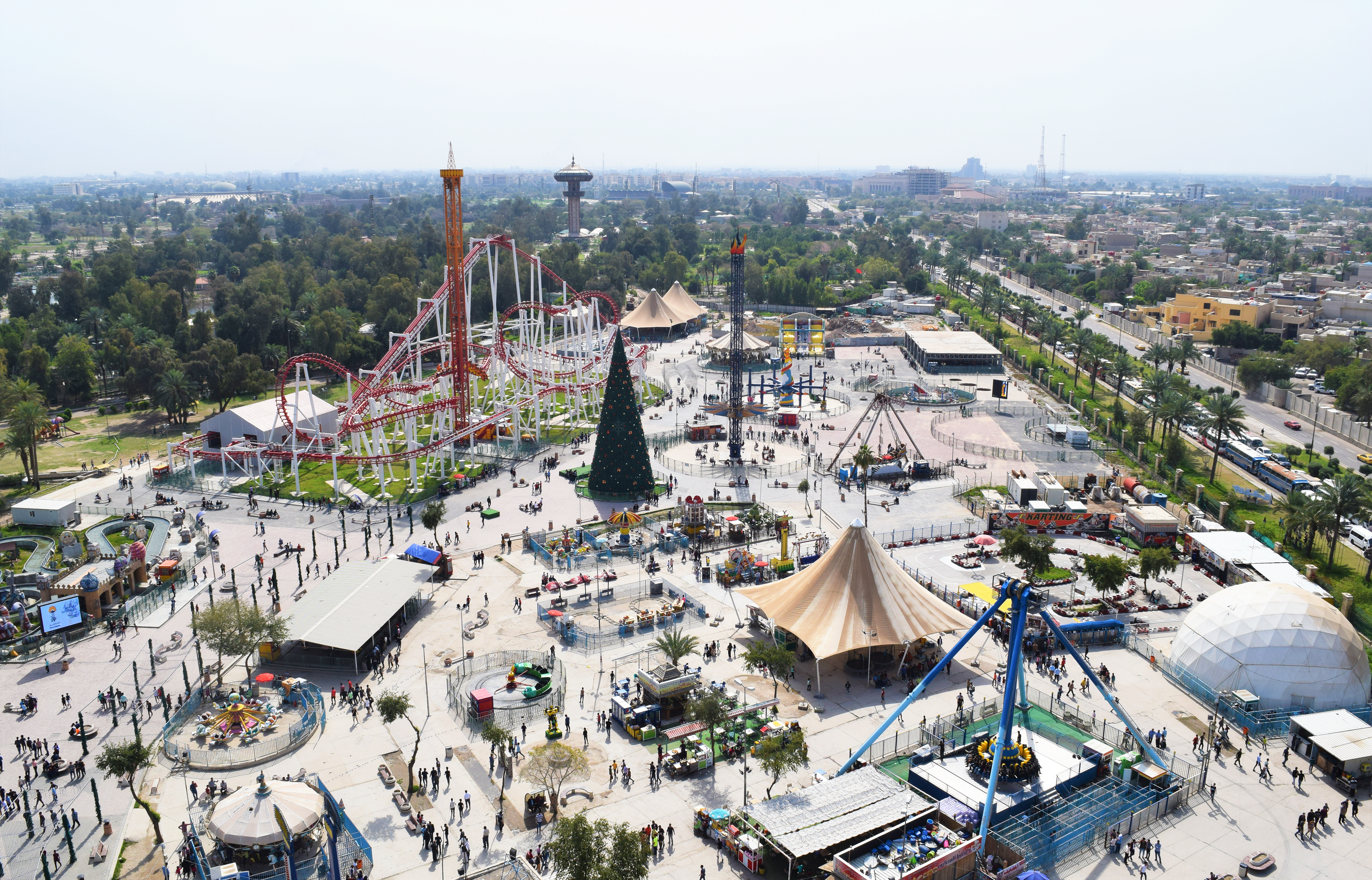
Al-Zawra'a Park

The Baghdad Zoo was built in 1971 under Ahmed Hassan al-Bakr.

The facilities were insufficient, with small confinement spaces considered inhumane. After the first Gulf War, Iraq's zoos suffered from the United Nations Iraq sanctions, limited particular foods, medicines, and vaccines.

Saddam Hussein closed the zoo for renovations in the spring of 2002.

=== 2003 invasion ===
The zoo was destroyed during the 2003 invasion of Iraq. For their own safety, zoo workers suspended feeding the animals in early April 2003, when Fedayeen Saddam troops took up defensive positions around the zoo as U.S. forces began the battle of Baghdad. Out of the original 650 to 700 animals in the Baghdad Zoo only 35 had survived to the eighth day of the invasion, and these tended to be some of the larger animals.

During the absence of zoo staff and officials, the zoo suffered from severe looting. Cages were torn open by thieves who released or took hundreds of animals and birds. Zoo staff said most of the birds and game animals were taken for food as pre-war food shortages in Baghdad were exacerbated by the invasion.

Many animals were found roaming the zoo grounds. The remaining animals were found in critical condition, dying of thirst and starving in their cages, including Mandor, a 20-year-old Siberian tiger that was the personal property of Uday Hussein, and Saida, a blind brown bear.

Several lions escaped from the abandoned zoo and were rounded up by American soldiers in armored fighting vehicles. Four that attacked the soldiers were then shot by the soldiers. Comics author Brian K. Vaughan wrote the fictionalized graphic novel Pride of Baghdad based on the lions, giving each speech and a personality.

=== Rebuilding the zoo ===
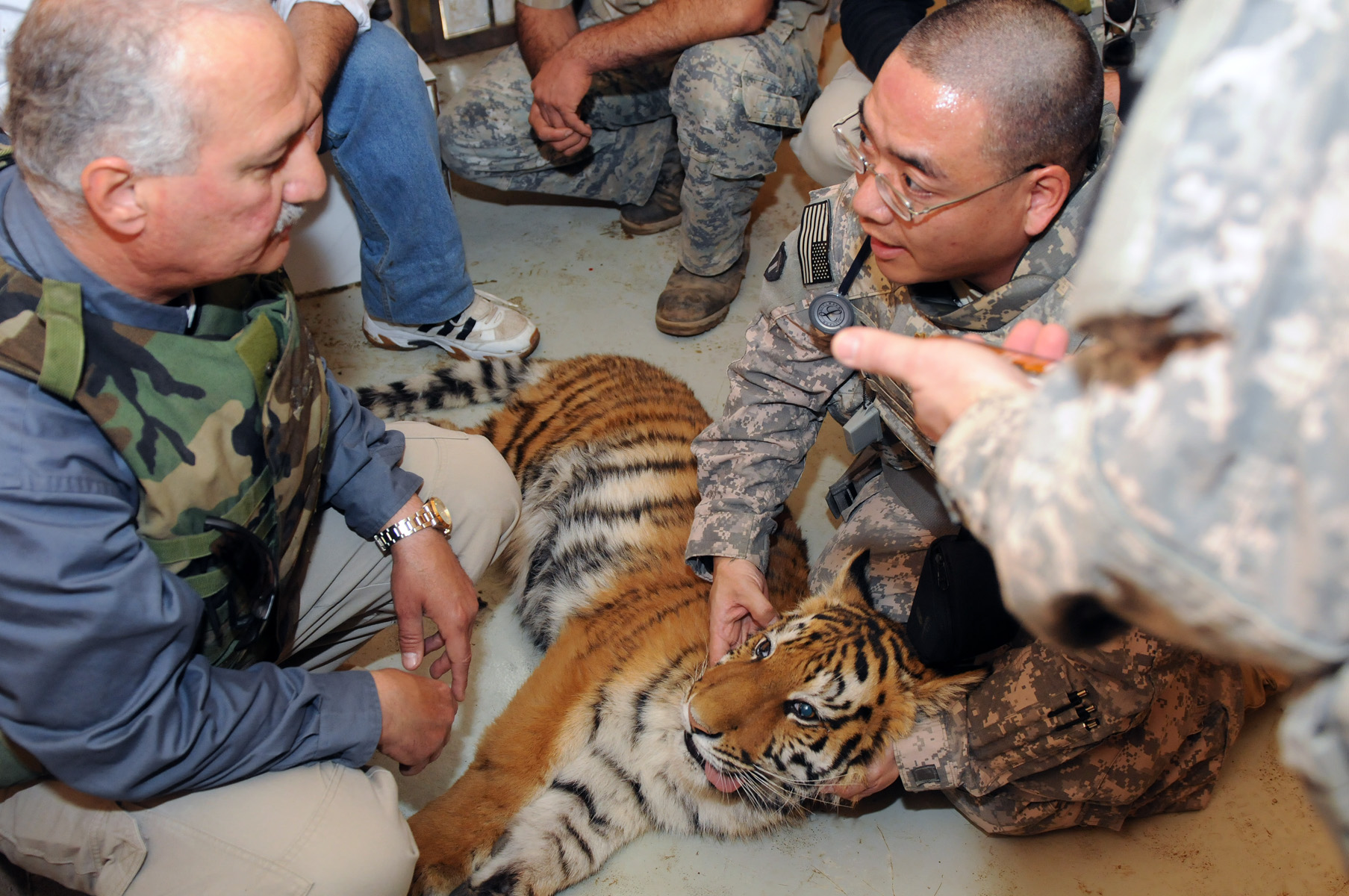
Doctors from the U.S. Army give a tiger cub a medical check-up

In mid-April 2003 South African conservationist Lawrence Anthony from the Thula Thula Game Reserve in Zululand, traveled in a hired car with two assistants from Kuwait to bring relief to the Baghdad Zoo, the first civilians to gain entry to Iraq after the invasion. Working with the Baghdad Zoo directors Dr. Adel Salman Mousa and Dr. Husham Mohamed Hussan and a few returning staff they began caring for and feeding the remaining animals, restoring basic hygiene standards, and stabilizing the situation. Anthony's journey to the zoo was delayed by safety and bureaucracy issues in the chaos of the war, and he arrived at the zoo 8 days after the invasion and started to rescue the surviving animals.

U.S. Army Captain William Sumner of the 354th Civil Affairs Brigade was the military officer in charge of the zoo and joined the team improving security and stemming the tide of looters. He appointed Anthony as interim zoo administrator, and remained in charge of the zoo for 14 months. He departed with his brigade in March 2004. Iraqi veteran Farah Murrani joined the rescue effort with Brendan Whittington-Jones of the Thula Thula game reserve. At various times they were joined by other conservation organizations including Wildaid, Care for the Wild International, and IFAW.

The zoo and surrounding park reopened to the public on July 20, 2003, following improvements and renovations by US Army engineers and featured 86 animals, including all 19 surviving lions. Most of these animals were rescued after the invasion from menageries at the Hussein family palaces and private zoos around Baghdad during the ongoing conflict, and included lions, tigers, brown bears, wolves, foxes, jackals, camels, ostriches, badgers, and some primates.

Whittington-Jones and Murrani remained at the zoo for another year during which time they also found homes in the US for over 30 Baghdad street dogs.

The story of the rescue of the Baghdad zoo is recounted in the book Babylon's Ark by authors Lawrence Anthony and Graham Spence. A more recent book for children called Saving the Baghdad Zoo, a True Story of Hope and Heroes, was released on February 9, 2010.

=== Setbacks ===
On September 18, 2003, a group of U.S. Army Reserve soldiers and Iraqi police held a party in the zoo after it had closed. Sergeant Keith Mitchell of the 422nd Civil Affairs Battalion had his right arm severely mauled by a male Bengal tiger; a soldier, seeing the attack, initially shot and wounded the tiger, when this failed to stop the tiger a final shot fatally wounded the caged animal which bled to death. One report says that Mitchell was trying to feed the tiger a chicken kabob, but Mitchell denied this. The initial reports of drunkenness by the soldiers led to public condemnation, but Mitchell said he had one beer. Tests were not performed until the next morning on a half-dozen of the soldiers which found no evidence of alcohol. Court martial proceedings occurred in Washington, D.C., where Mitchell was exonerated of charges. Mitchell's rank was restored after a three-month probationary period. The tiger underwent a necropsy, in which no foreign food was found in its digestive tract, nor was any found around or near the cage. The event inspired a play titled Bengal Tiger at the Baghdad Zoo, which was staged by the Center Theatre Group in Los Angeles in 2009 and 2010. Mitchell received an honorable medical discharge in 2006, but died from complications of diabetes, something he developed during the 24 reconstructive surgeries on his arm, in April, 2007, leaving a wife and one daughter. The North Carolina–based Conservators' Center, an exotic-wildlife conservation and preservation center, offered to donate two mix-breed tiger cubs to the Baghdad Zoo. After considerable legal and bureaucratic hurdles the tigers were delivered to the zoo on August 4, 2008. They were a male, Riley, and a female, Hope.

In 2009, three wild boars at the zoo were euthanized due to fears that they could get infected with the A/H1N1 flu virus (Swine flu).

=== Recovery ===
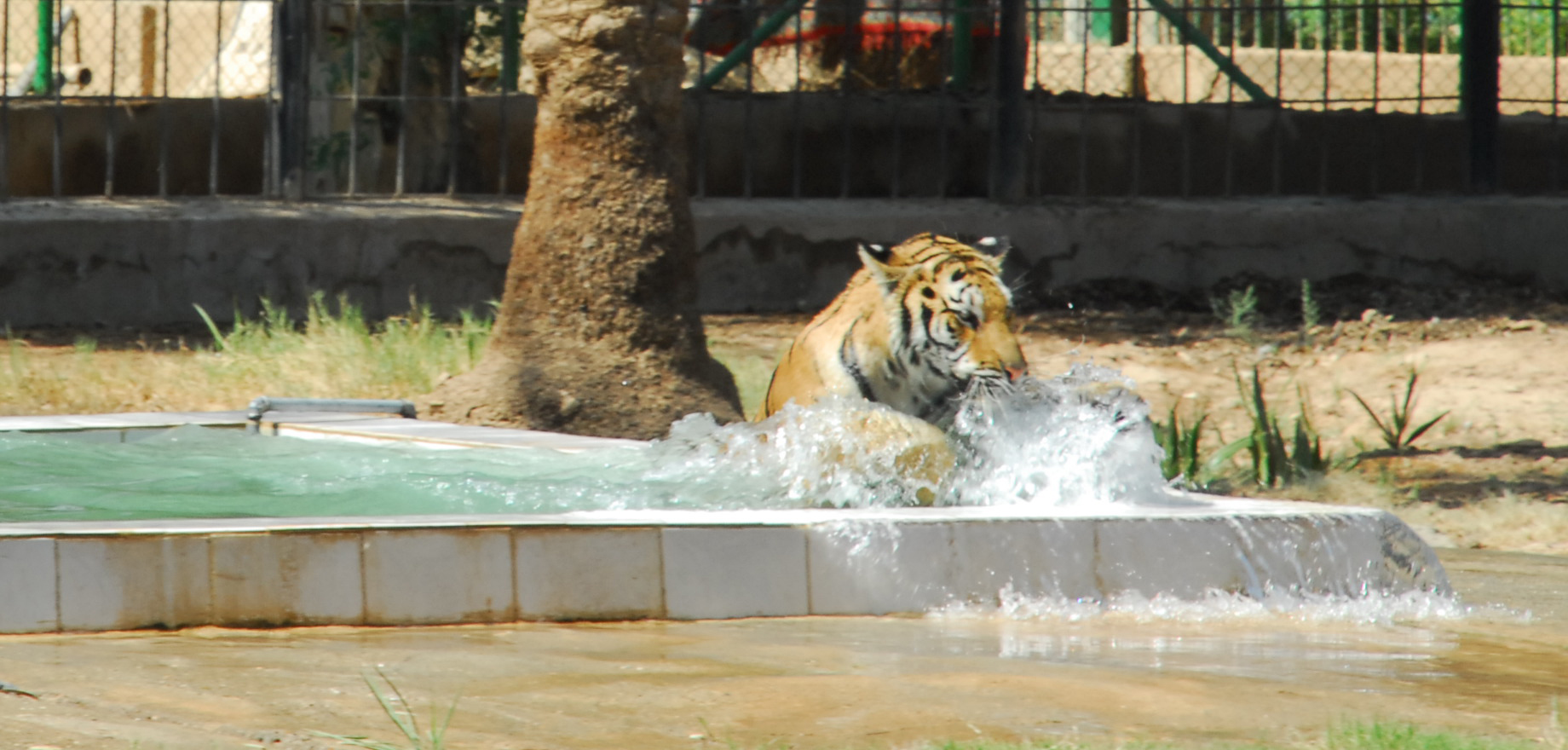
Hope playing in her new pool

In 2008, the zoo had grown to about 800 animals, though most of these were birds. The only large animals at the zoo were two female lions left from the 22 original lions before the invasion. On August 4, 2008, the zoo received two tiger cubs (Hope and Riley) from the Mebane, North Carolina–based Conservators' Center, an exotic-wildlife conservation and preservation center.

By 2009, the zoo reported that they had about 1070 animals. To keep visitors safe, Zawraa Park, in which the zoo is located, is guarded by the special police units that guard other government facilities. Visitors are frisked and bags and baskets are checked for explosives. Although numbers cannot be verified, the director general of parks and gardens, Salah Abu al-Lail, expected close to 8 million visitors to the park in 2009.

== Botany ==
Plant species within the zoo and Al Zawra’a Gardens include:

- Acacia cyanophylla
- Albizia lebbeck
- Bombax ceiba
- Bauhinia purpurea
- Callistemon lanceolatus
- Casuarina equisetifolia
- Cordia alliodora
- Cupressus sempervirens
- Cynodon dactylon
- Eucalyptus camaldulensis
- Eugenia caryophyllus
- Ficus benghalensis
- Ficus nitida
- Ficus religiosa
- Melia azedarach
- Morus alba
- Olea europaea
- Pinus halepensis
- Phoenix dactylifera
- Populus euphratica
- Pyrus calleryana
- Salix babylonica
- Schinus molle
- Schinus terebinthifolia
- Sterculia sp.
- Tamarix sp.
- Washingtonia filifera
- Thevetia peruviana
- Ziziphus spina-christi

== See also ==
- Fauna of Iraq
