= Babylon's Ark =

Book

Babylon's Ark, The Incredible Wartime Rescue of the Baghdad Zoo (2007) is a book by South African conservationist Lawrence Anthony, with writer Graham Spence. The book tells of the struggle to save the Baghdad Zoo during the US-led Coalition invasion of Iraq.

== Summary ==
The book focuses on how in early 2003, during the invasion of Iraq, South African conservationist Lawrence Anthony, realized that there would be no one looking after the biggest zoo in the Middle East, and left his Thula Thula game reserve home in Zululand, South Africa, for war-blockaded Kuwait.

Anthony wrangled his way into becoming the first civilian, apart from media, to gain access to Iraq and then, drove a hired car from Kuwait, unarmed and unescorted, into the heart of Baghdad.

On arrival, Anthony found that a battle had been fought in the surrounding park, and that the zoo had been damaged and badly looted. Hundreds of animals had died, escaped, or been stolen for food. Zoo veterinarian Dr Husham Hussan and two zoo staff met him, beginning the rescue.

Anthony tells of his many adventures, for example, how he found himself sleeping with fighting troops, including tank crews of the US 3rd Infantry Division in the derelict Al-Rashid Hotel, made friends with government officials, soldiers and rallied foreign mercenaries to his cause. He recounts raiding bombed palaces and ruined hotels for food and supplies to feed animals and zoo staff, and rescuing lions, cheetahs and ostriches from Uday Hussein's palace.

Bobby Rob, Lawrence's Thula Thula game reserve manager, arrives to assist, and together with US Captain William Sumner, the courageous zoo directors Dr Adel Mousa and Dr Husham Hussan, Iraqi veterinarian Farah Murrani, and a few loyal zoo staff, they formed an intrepid team which secured the zoo and somehow kept the remaining animals alive and the zoo safe in some extreme circumstances. Confronted by an appalling situation, cut off from the world and completely surrounded by fighting and looting, the team overcame every "can't be done," to hold together the remains of what was once the biggest zoo in the Middle East literally out of nothing. At various times they are assisted by other conservation organizations including AZA, Wildaid, Care for the Wild, and IFAW.

As the fighting eases, the team is able to get around the city with help from the military and rescue starving and abused animals from other facilities in Baghdad and bring them back to the zoo for safekeeping.

News of the whereabouts of Saddam Hussein’s magnificent personal herd of thoroughbred Arabian horses, stolen during the invasion, arrives at the zoo and in an adventurous raid, led by Captains William Sumner and Gavino Rivas with Whittington-Jones and Murrani assisting, seventeen horses are recovered and returned to the Iraqi people.

Later the French Army sent in army engineers who overhauled and upgraded the infrastructure of the zoo and surrounding park. The zoo and park were reopened to the public on July 19, 2003.

On September 17, 2003, the day after Anthony returned home to South Africa, an American soldier, who had reportedly been drinking, attempted to feed the zoo's prize Bengal tiger "Malooh" through the enclosure bars and was bitten on the hand after. His companion then shot the still-caged tiger with a pistol, and it bled to death overnight.

=== Conclusion ===
At its conclusion, the book gives a sobering view of the dwindling spiral of life on Earth as a result of the deterioration of the plant and animal kingdoms and the planet's environment. Lawrence speaks of how the rescue inspired the formation of The Earth Organization, a grass roots international non-profit, conservation and environment organization, with new solutions, committed to the creative responsible rehabilitation of planet Earth and the plant and animal kingdoms.

== Publication ==
Babylon's Ark was first picked up by Paraview Literary Agency and was then adopted, published and released by St. Martin's Press of New York in early March 2007. An audiobook version narrated by Simon Vance was released in 2015.

== Reception ==
Prior to launch, Babylon's Ark received starred reviews in the United States, from both Booklist and Kirkus Reviews denoting it "a book of remarkable merit."

== Film script ==
In early 2005, a screenwriter from Los Angeles, Terry Jastrow, with the invitation of Lawrence Anthony, flew to South Africa and stayed with Lawrence at his game reserve Thula Thula. Jastrow wanted to learn more about Lawrence's trip to Iraq during the early days of the Iraqi War to save the animals in the Baghdad Zoo, and write a screenplay suitable for a feature film.

Lawrence's first book, Babylon's Ark, written with Graham Spence, was in galley form at the time, and provided useful context and guidance. Each morning Terry would sit with Lawrence to gain a more complete understanding of the events which occurred before, during, and after Lawrence's effort to save the animals at the zoo. Each afternoon Terry would write pages of the script and submit them for Lawrence's review. This process was greatly aided by Lawrence's wife Francoise Malby and his son Dylan.

After completion of a first draft screenplay entitled Good Luck, Mr. Anthony, Terry returned to Los Angeles and submitted the script to Beacon Pictures. Beacon immediately optioned the screenplay and formally submitted it to Disney Studios. For reasons having nothing to do with the script or the project, the film was not made and the rights expired.

== See also ==
- Bengal Tiger at the Baghdad Zoo
- Pride of Baghdad
