= Christina Herrström =

Swedish author and screenwriter (born 1959)

Christina Yngvesdotter Herrström Schildt (born Herrström, 23 August 1959 in Lidingö, Sweden) is a Swedish author and screenwriter. She has been married to Peter Schildt. She has written among the children's books Ebba & Didrik, Glappet and Tusen gånger starkare and she has also written the films/TV series based on these books. Glappet was first a TV series but she wrote a book based on it. She has also written other films and TV series.
