= Kobra (TV programme) =

Swedish television programme about culture

- Presented by: Kristofer Lundström
- Opening theme: 1:2:3
- Composers: Goran Kajfes and David Österberg
- Country of origin: Sweden
- Original language: Swedish
- No. of seasons: 28

Production
- Producer: Maria Magnusson
- Editor: Jane Magnusson
- Running time: about 30 minutes

Original release
- Network: SVT
- Release: 2001 – present

Kobra was a Swedish television programme produced by SVT with interviews and reportage about culture, presented by Kristofer Lundström. It started in 2001. The programme was broadcast 10 p.m., Tuesday evenings. The programme won the Kristallen in 2005 and 2009 for best lifestyle/magazine programme and best culture and society programme respectively.

== History ==
Kobra started in 2001 with Ingvar Storm as presenter. Since 2002 Kristofer Lundström is the presenter. The program is presenting about modern art expressions in Sweden and in the world to discuss social and political tendencies in present time.

In Kobra several well-known culture personalities have participated, such as Norman Mailer, Joyce Carol Oates, David Lynch, Takashi Murakami, Emir Kusturica, Viktor & Rolf, Madonna, M.I.A., Nick Cave, Jeff Koons, Katharine Hamnett, Ingmar Bergman, Nan Goldin, Michel Gondry, Rajiv Chandrasekaran, Philip Gourevitch, John le Carré, Susan Faludi, Chris Anderson, Isabelle Huppert, Woody Allen and Bruce Springsteen.

== Seasons ==
=== Season 24 ===
| No. overall | No. in season | Title | Theme | Original release date |
|---|---|---|---|---|
| TBA | 1 | "Är slutet nära?" | Apocalypse | October 3, 2012 |
| TBA | 2 | "Kobra om Domedagen (del. 2) – i fiktionens värld" | Apocalypse | October 10, 2012 |
| TBA | 3 | "Kobra om konst och aktivism" | Art and activism | October 17, 2012 |
| TBA | 4 | "Kobra om mormoner" | Mormons | October 24, 2012 |
| TBA | 5 | "Familjefejdens pris – vad kostar det?" | Family conflicts from art | October 31, 2012 |
| TBA | 6 | "Kobra om cheerleading" | Cheerleading | November 7, 2012 |
| TBA | 7 | "Kobra om kulturens nekrofiler" | Posthumous celebrity | November 14, 2012 |
| TBA | 8 | "Videokonst" | Video art | November 21, 2012 |
| TBA | 9 | "Svensk filmvåg med klass" | Contemporary film in Sweden | November 28, 2012 |
| TBA | 10 | "Koreansk popkultur" | Korean popular culture | December 5, 2012 |
| TBA | 11 | "Guld" | Gold | December 12, 2012 |
| TBA | 12 | "Kobra besöker världens minsta och samtidigt kanske mäktigaste stat: Vatikanen" | Vatican City | December 19, 2012 |

=== Season 25 ===
| No. overall | No. in season | Title | Theme | Original release date |
|---|---|---|---|---|
| TBA | 1 | "3D-skrivare" | 3D-printers | March 11, 2013 |
| TBA | 2 | "Hitlerhumor" | Hitler humour | March 20, 2013 |
| TBA | 3 | "Västafrika" | West Africa | March 27, 2013 |
| TBA | 4 | "Hypnos" | Hypnos | April 3, 2013 |
| TBA | 5 | "Grekland – kultur med kniven mot strupen" | Greek government-debt crisis and culture | April 10, 2013 |
| TBA | 6 | "Det våras för trollen" | Trolls | April 17, 2013 |
| TBA | 7 | "Colombia – ett land besatt av skönhet" | Colombia and beauty | April 24, 2013 |
| TBA | 8 | "Försvarstal" | Apologies | May 1, 2013 |
| TBA | 9 | "Analog längtan" | Analogue | May 8, 2013 |
| TBA | 10 | "Behövs mannen" | The man | May 15, 2013 |
| TBA | 11 | "Vad står regn för?" | Rain | May 22, 2013 |
| TBA | 12 | "Post-turism" | Post-tourism | May 29, 2013 |

=== Season 26 ===
| No. overall | No. in season | Title | Theme | Original release date |
|---|---|---|---|---|
| TBA | 1 | "Drömmen om Hollywood" | Hollywood | October 2, 2013 |
| TBA | 2 | "Världens främta konsthändelse – Venedigbiennalen" | Venice Biennale | October 9, 2013 |
| TBA | 3 | "Hur bra är testet – Kobra granskar!" | Tests | October 16, 2013 |
| TBA | 4 | "Hur mår kulturen i det högernationalistiska Ungern?" | Culture in present Hungary | October 23, 2013 |
| TBA | 5 | "Ny diplomati" | Whistle blowers | October 30, 2013 |
| TBA | 6 | "Varför är B-film den nya A-filmen?" | B-films | November 6, 2013 |
| TBA | 7 | "Vart är kartan på väg?" | Maps | November 13, 2013 |
| TBA | 8 | "Kan vem som helst bli superhjälte?" | Super heroes | November 20, 2013 |
| TBA | 9 | "Svensk hiphop har aldrig varit hetare än nu" | Swedish hip hop | November 27, 2013 |
| TBA | 10 | "Ensamhet" | Loneliness | December 4, 2013 |
| TBA | 11 | "Konst och makt" | Art and power | December 11, 2013 |
| TBA | 12 | "Hur har arabvåren påverkat kulturen?" | Arab spring and culture | December 18, 2013 |

=== Season 27 ===
| No. overall | No. in season | Title | Theme | Original release date |
|---|---|---|---|---|
| TBA | 1 | "Pranks" | Pranks | March 12, 2014 |
| TBA | 2 | "Drönare – onda eller goda" | Drones | March 19, 2014 |
| TBA | 3 | "Det svenska spelundret" | Game industry in Sweden | March 26, 2014 |
| TBA | 4 | "#iseefaces – vi ser ansikten överallt" | #iseefaces | April 2, 2014 |
| TBA | 5 | "Första världskriget 100 år – är det dags nu igen?"" | First World War | April 9, 2014 |
| TBA | 6 | "Riot Grrrls – var finns de idag?" | Riot grrrl | April 16, 2014 |
| TBA | 7 | "Vildar – varför är civiliserat så trist?" | Savages | April 23, 2014 |
| TBA | 8 | "Varför är skotska kulturen separatistisk?" | Scottish independence movement | April 30, 2014 |
| TBA | 9 | "Handskriften under attack" | Handwriting | May 7, 2014 |
| TBA | 10 | "Malik Bendjelloul" | Malik Bendjelloul | May 14, 2014 |
| TBA | 11 | "Hjärnan är det viktigaste organet – enligt hjärnan" | Brains | May 21, 2014 |
| TBA | 12 | "Ufon – visst finns de!" | UFOs | May 28, 2014 |

=== Season 28 ===
| No. overall | No. in season | Title | Theme | Original release date |
|---|---|---|---|---|
| TBA | 1 | "Insekter, som konst – och som föda!" | Insects | September 24, 2014 |
| TBA | 2 | "Marina Abramović" | Marina Abramović | October 1, 2014 |
| TBA | 3 | "1984 – klarade vi oss undan?" | 1984 (novel) | October 8, 2014 |
| TBA | 4 | "Äldreboende jorden – vad händer med kulturen?" | Older population | October 15, 2014 |
| TBA | 5 | "Mens – håller tabut på att försvinna?" | Menstruation | October 22, 2014 |
| TBA | 6 | "När slumpen styr" | Randomness | October 29, 2014 |
| TBA | 7 | "Kultur på flykt" | Culture in refugee camps | November 5, 2014 |
| TBA | 8 | "Transrevolutionen är här!" | Transculture | November 12, 2014 |
| TBA | 9 | "Böneutop – vem får låta?" | Adhan | November 19, 2014 |
| TBA | 10 | "Poesi – hur når man ut?" | Poetry | November 26, 2014 |
| TBA | 11 | "Sydafrikansk samtidskonst" | Contemporary art in South Africa | December 3, 2014 |
