= Johar Bendjelloul =

Swedish television presenter and journalist

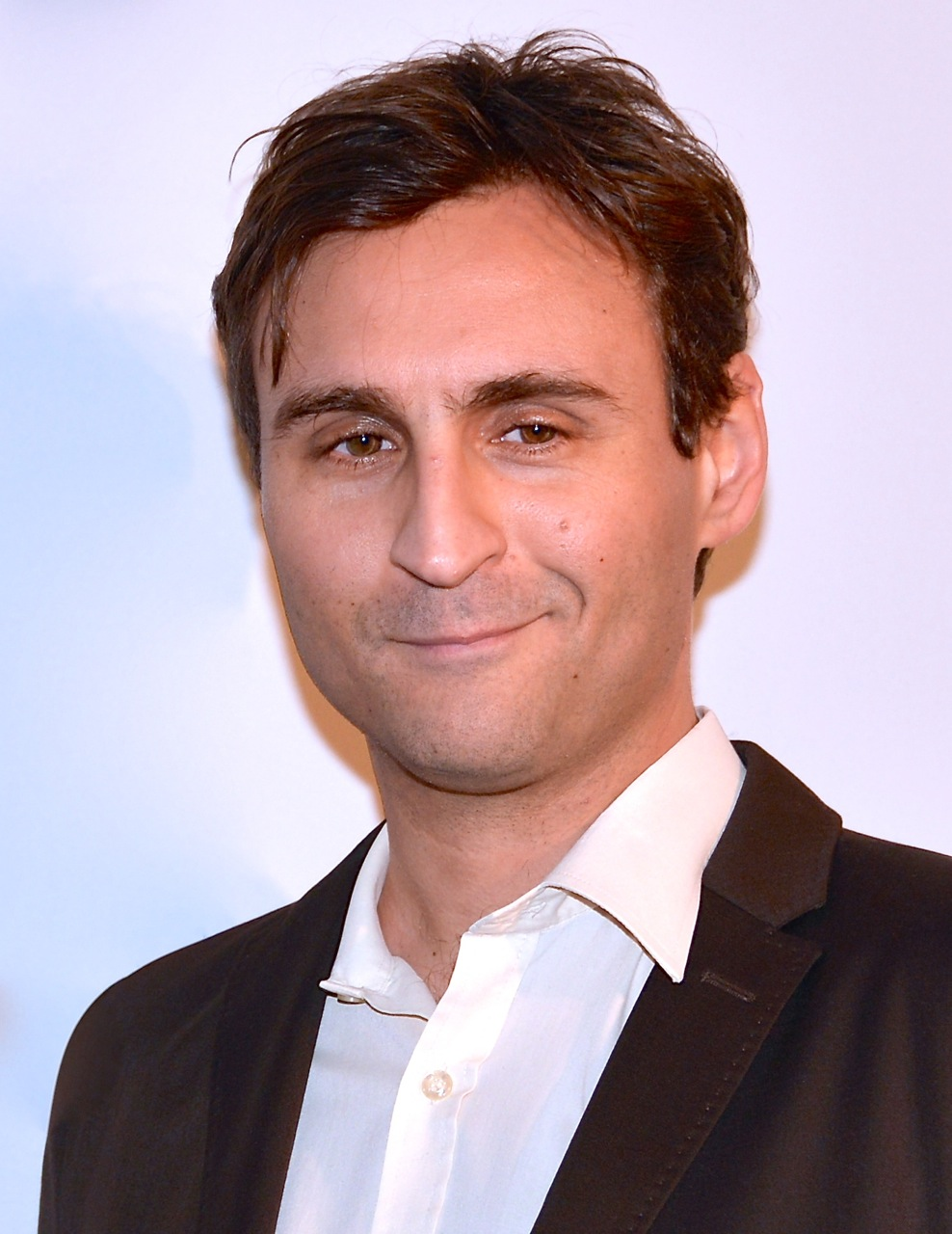
- Johar Bendjelloul at the 2012 Guldbagge Awards
- Born: 1 September 1975 (age 50); Stockholm, Sweden
- Occupations: Television presenter, journalist

Johar Bendjelloul (born 1 September 1975) is a Swedish television presenter and journalist.

Since 2013, Bendjelloul has been hosting P1 Morgon at Sveriges Radio. Before that he was a television presenter at SVT1 for Gomorron Sverige, Babel, Kulturnyheterna and Aktuellt.

He has also done voice acting doing one of the characters in the children's movie Jack & Pedro.

== Personal life ==
Johar is the son of Algerian-born physician Hacène Bendjelloul and Swedish translator and painter Veronica Schildt, making him grandson of actor Henrik Schildt.

His brother Malik Bendjelloul was an Academy Award-winning filmmaker for the documentary Searching for Sugar Man. Malik committed suicide on 13 May 2014 after struggling with depression, as Johar reported to the media.
