= Thula Thula =

Private game reserve in South Africa

Thula Thula Private Game Reserve
- Location within South Africa
- Location: KwaZulu-Natal province, South Africa
- Nearest town: Empangeni, South Africa
- Coordinates: 28°35′24″S 31°45′27″E
- Area: 45 km^{2} (17 sq mi)
- Established: 1911
- Website: Official website

Thula Thula Private Game Reserve is a private game reserve situated in Zululand, KwaZulu-Natal province in South Africa. It is part of the Royal Zulu Biosphere.

Thula Thula means ‘peace and tranquility’ in Zulu.

== History ==
Thula Thula was once the private hunting grounds of the mighty Zulu Warrior, King Shaka. The first historic meeting between Shaka and his father, Senzangakhona, which set the stage for the creation of the Zulu Nation, took place at the Nseleni River at Thula Thula.

The land became a game reserve in 1911 and is believed to be the oldest private game reserve in KwaZulu-Natal.

The reserve has two lodges.

== Owners ==
Thula Thula was owned and operated by international conservationist and founder of the Earth Organization Lawrence Anthony, and by his wife Francoise Malby-Anthony. The reserve is the setting for Lawrence's books The Elephant Whisperer (2009) and The Last Rhinos (2012).

Following Anthony's death in 2012 the Earth Organization was separated from Thula Thula; Francoise Malby-Anthony founded the South African Conservation Fund and continues to run the reserve.

In 2018 Francoise Malby-Anthony published a sequel to Lawrence's books titled An Elephant in my Kitchen (2018)

== Wildlife ==
Thula Thula is home to a wide variety of animals, including African bush elephant, Cape buffalo, southern white rhinoceros, African leopard, South African giraffe, zebra, nyala, hyena, Nile crocodile, kudu, and wildebeest, as well as other indigenous species. In addition, more than 350 species of birds have been identified, including a breeding population of white-backed vulture.

== Conservation ==
Since Lawrence's death in 2012, his wife Francoise has started various conservation projects including a Wildlife Rehabilitation Center and a Conservation Volunteer Camp. For her effort in conservation Francoise was awarded the French Abroad Award at the Ministry of Europe and Foreign Affairs in Paris in March 2019.

== Elephants ==
In 1999, Lawrence Anthony was asked to accept a herd of 'rogue' wild elephants from Mpumalanga onto Thula Thula, as they were destined to be shot unless alternative arrangements could be made. The herd was housed in a boma on Thula Thula, but managed to break free and escape. The elephants were successfully tracked, recovered and transported back to Thula Thula.

The herd had grown to 29 elephants as of 2018, including Nana, Frankie and Mabula. The herd's matriarch, Frankie, died of a liver failure in January 2021, leaving 28 elephants remaining at Thula Thula.

The story of the elephants' rehabilitation and Lawrence's subsequent relationship with the herd is told in his 2009 book, The Elephant Whisperer. The peripatetic American zoologist Jack Hanna visited Thula Thula, which was featured in two episodes of his television series, Jack Hanna's Into the Wild: Season 13, Episode 5, titled simply Thula Thula, and Season 13, Episode 7, titled The Elephant Whisperer, after the book.
