= Johan Schildt =

Swedish actor, screenwriter, publisher

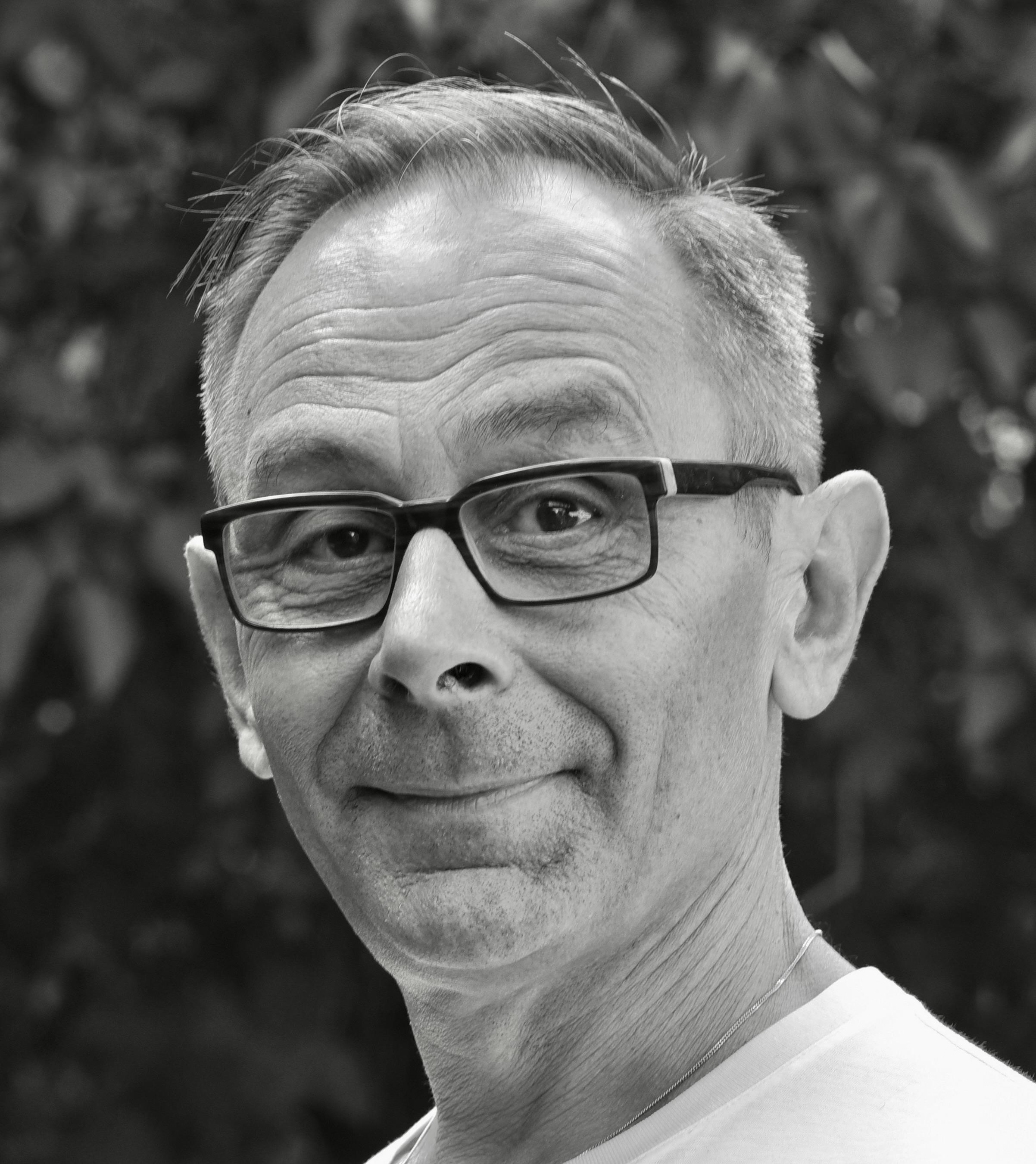
- Born: 7 May 1959; Spånga-Kista församling

Johan Henrik Christian Schildt (born 7 May 1959 in Stockholm) is a Swedish actor, screenwriter, publisher.

Johan Schildt also runs the publishing company Inova that published notably the astronomical yearbook titled Astronomisk Årsbok and later also the astronomical calendar Stjärnhimlen - utgivningen. Both yearbooks ceased paper publication in 2000. But the calendar is still available online.

He is the son of actor Henrik Schildt and his second wife, the actress Berit Schildt, née Gramer. He is also half brother to the artist and translator Veronica Schildt and to actor Peter Schildt.

== Selected filmography ==
- 1979 – Trälarnas uppror (TV series)
- 1981 – Det våras för Smurfan
- 1981 – Smurferna och den fiffige trollkarlen
- 1986 – Amorosa
- 1987 – Varuhuset (TV series)
- 1994 – Niente più
- 1995 – Anmäld försvunnen (TV series)
- 1998 – Muntra fruarna i Windsor
- 1998 – OP7 (TV series)
- 2001 – Nya tider (TV series)
- 2010 – Klara
- 2011 – Bibliotekstjuven (TV series)
- 2012 – Tingeling – Vingarnas hemlighet
