= Lawrence Anthony =

South African conservationist, environmentalist, explorer and author

- Born: 17 September 1950; Johannesburg, Union of South Africa
- Died: 2 March 2012 (aged 61)
- Occupation: Wildlife conservationist
- Spouse: Françoise Malby
- Children: 2

Lawrence Anthony (17 September 1950 – 2 March 2012) was a South African conservationist, environmentalist, explorer and author. He was the long-standing head of conservation at the Thula Thula animal reserve in Zululand, South Africa, and the founder of The Earth Organization, a privately registered, independent, international conservation and environmental group. He was an international member of the Explorers Club of New York and a member of the National Council of the Southern Africa Association for the Advancement of Science.

Anthony had a reputation for bold conservation initiatives, including the rescue of the Baghdad Zoo at the height of the US-led Coalition invasion of Iraq in 2003, and negotiations with the Lord's Resistance Army rebel army in Southern Sudan, to raise awareness of the environment and protect endangered species, including the last of the Northern White Rhinoceros.

Details of his conservation activities appeared in regional and international media including CNN, CBS, BBC, Al Jazeera and Sky TV and featured in Reader's Digest, the Smithsonian, the Explorers Journal, Africa Geographic, the Men's Journal, Shape magazine, and Elle magazine.

Anthony died of a heart attack at the age of 61 before his planned March 2012 conservation gala dinner in Durban to raise international awareness for the rhino-poaching crisis and to launch his new book, The Last Rhinos: My Battle to Save One of the World's Greatest Creatures. Following his death, there were reports that some of the elephants he worked to save came to his family's home in accordance with the way elephants usually mourn the death of one of their own.

== Biography ==
Anthony was born in Johannesburg, South Africa. His grandfather, who was a miner in Berwick-upon-Tweed, England, had migrated to the area in the 1920s to work in the gold mines. His father, who ran an insurance business, went about establishing new offices across Southern Africa; Anthony was raised in rural Rhodesia (now called Zimbabwe), Zambia, and Malawi, before settling in Zululand, South Africa.

Anthony also started his career in the insurance sector, though subsequently started working the real estate development business. Meanwhile, he started working with Zulu tribespeople, by mid-1990s, his passion for the African Bush inspired him to switch careers, when he bought the Thula Thula game reserve, spread over 5,000-acre in KwaZulu-Natal starting his career as a conservationist. He was called by a conservation group to rescue a group of nine elephants who had escaped their enclosure and were wreaking havoc across Northern Mpumalanga, and were about to be shot. He tried to communicate with the matriarch of the herd through the tone of his voice and body language, eventually rescued them and brought to the reserve, and in time came to be known as "Elephant-whisperer".

In the following years, he established a conservation group, The Earth Organization in 2003, and his efforts led to the establishment of two new reserves, the Royal Zulu Biosphere in Zululand and the Mayibuye Game Reserve in Kwa Ximba, aimed at providing local tribe people income through wildlife tourism.

Anthony was married to Francoise Malby and lived on the Thula Thula game reserve in Zululand. He has two sons. Francoise Malby Anthony also wrote accounts of their work with the elephants.

After his death, a group of wild elephants which he had helped rescue and rehabilitate walked up to his home on their own, and stood around in an apparent vigil for two days, before disappearing.

In April 2012, he was posthumously awarded honorary Doctor of Science degree by College of Agriculture, Engineering and Science, University of KwaZulu-Natal.

== Baghdad Zoo ==
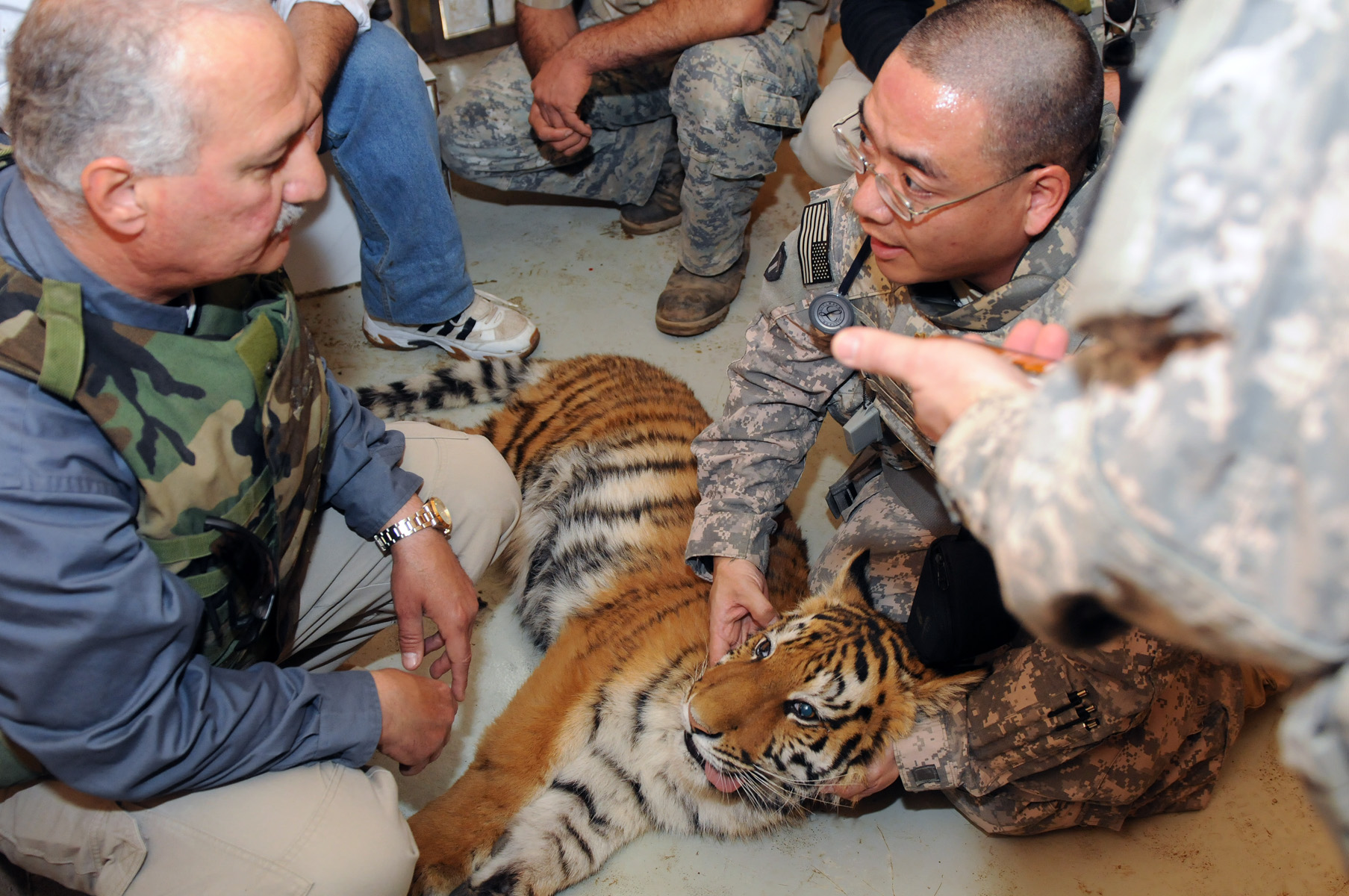
A tiger cub at the Baghdad Zoo, which Anthony helped rescue, being given a medical check-up by US Army Doctors

Baghdad Zoo was the biggest zoo in the Middle East; however, by 8 days after the 2003 invasion, when Anthony reached the zoo on a private rescue initiative, out of the original 700 animals in the Baghdad Zoo only 35 survived owing to bombing of the zoo, looting of the animals for food, and starvation of the caged animals without food and water. Anthony could not get to the zoo any earlier at the height of the war owing to safety, transport and bureaucracy issues. The animals that survived tended to be the larger animals, including bears, hyenas, lions and tigers. In the chaos of the war, Anthony used mercenaries to help protect the zoo, and looked after the animals with the help of some of the zookeepers, feeding the carnivores by buying donkeys on the streets of Baghdad. US Army soldiers, Iraqi civilians and various other volunteers including former Republican Guard soldiers came to assist. Eventually L. Paul Bremer, then head of the Coalition Provisional Authority, supported the zoo and American engineers helped to reopen it. Anthony wrote a book about the wartime rescue of the Baghdad Zoo, and the movie rights have been acquired by a major Hollywood production company.

== African conservation ==
Anthony was involved with programs to involve remote African tribes in conservation on their own traditional land. He had created two new Game Reserves in South Africa. The Royal Zulu Biosphere in Zululand, which is expanding to join the Umfolozi Hluhluwe reserve, and the Mayibuye Game Reserve in Kwa Ximba.

Anthony's private focus was the rehabilitation of traumatized African elephant. Anthony's second book, The Elephant Whisperer, tells the story of his working relationship with the African elephant.

Within two days of Anthony's death, a group of 21 elephants Anthony had saved and befriended walked two days to his home. They stood rigid for hours, then began making distress noises as though they knew he had died. For years after on the anniversary of his death, this same herd repeated the journey to his home. No one communicated to the animals that Anthony had died.

Anthony had served on the National Transitional Executive Committee during the South African Governments transition from Apartheid on the panel for the electronic media which appointed the board of directors of the South African Broadcasting Corporation and on the committee which appointed the Film Board of South Africa.

== Books ==
Anthony's books have been translated into several languages. His brother-in-law, Graham Spence co-authored his three books.

Anthony's first book Babylon's Ark, published by Thomas Dunne Books, is the true story of the wartime rescue of the Baghdad Zoo. Babylon's Ark won the Booklist Editors Choice in the category adult books for young adults, and the French 28th Prix Littéraire 30 millions d'amis literary award, popularly known as the Goncourt for animals.

Anthony's second book, The Elephant Whisperer, published by Pan Macmillan, tells the story of his adventures and relationship with a rescued herd of African elephants.

Anthony's third book, The Last Rhinos, published by Sidgwick & Jackson, is the true story of Anthony's involvement to rescue the remaining Northern White rhinoceros in the DR Congo.

== Awards and recognitions ==
- Member of the governing council of the Southern Africa Association for the Advancement of Science.
