= Peter Schildt =

Swedish actor

- Occupation: Film director, actor

Ernst Peter Jurgen Schildt (born 9 June 1951 in Stockholm) is a Swedish actor, screenwriter, film director, theatre director, etc. Schildt began acting at Vår teater, a children's theatre in Stockholm, as a child. He participated in theatre and in TV and radio throughout his schooling.

He is the son of actor Henrik Schildt and of Margareta. His is the brother of Johan Schildt, also an actor and a writer. Schildt was previously married to Christina Herrström.

== Filmography ==
=== Film ===
- Den gula bilen (1963)
- Ådalen 31 (1969)
- The Shot (1969)
- Games of Love and Loneliness (1977)
- Lycka till (1980), director
- Flight of the Eagle (1982)
- Gräsänklingar (1982)
- Amorosa (1986)
- The Christmas Oratorio (1996)
- Suxxess (2000), director, screenwriter
- Distant Land (2010), actor
- Tusen gånger starkare (2010), director
- Svensson, Svensson: i nöd och lust (2011)

=== Television ===
- August Strindberg: Ett liv (1985)
- Xerxes (1988), director
- Tre kärlekar (1989)
- Ebba & Didrik (1990), director
- Glappet (1997), director
- Ivar Kreuger (1999)
- Kronprinsessan (2006)
- Sommer (2008)
- Oskyldigt dömd (2008)
- Crimes of Passion (2013), director
