= The Elephant Whisperer =

Non-fiction book by Lawrence Anthony

The Elephant Whisperer: My Life with the Herd in the African Wild
- First edition (UK)
- Author: Lawrence Anthony with Graham Spence
- Language: English
- Genre: Non-fiction
- Publisher: Pan Macmillan (London), Thomas Dunne/St Martin's Press (New York)
- Publication date: 2009
- Publication place: United Kingdom, United States
- Media type: Print, e-book, audiobook
- Pages: 368 pp.
- ISBN: 978-0312565787
- OCLC: 317928636
- Preceded by: Babylon's Ark

The Elephant Whisperer published in April 2009 by Pan Macmillan in London and in July 2009 by Thomas Dunne/St Martin's Press in New York, is the second book written by South African author and conservationist Lawrence Anthony along with journalist Graham Spence.

== Overview ==
This bestselling book tells the story of a herd of wild African elephants on an African game reserve. The herd is destined to be shot for dangerous behaviour when Anthony intervenes to bring them to the Tula Tula wildlife preserve. The book covers Anthony's experiences during the years during which the herd acclimates to Tula Tula, including breakouts, infiltration by lions and poachers, the arrival of new animals, and interactions with humans.

The Elephant Whisperer has been translated into French, German, Italian, Chinese, and Spanish and has been published by Reader's Digest in France, Finland, Holland, Slovenia, Canada, and Sweden.

== Film and television ==
As of 2023, The Elephant Whisperer was in the process of being adapted into a feature film. British screenwriter and playwright Guy Hibbert has written the screenplay. The film is being directed by Robin Goode, and is being produced by Picturescope and Figment Films.

The peripatetic American zoologist Jack Hanna visited Thula Thula, which was featured in two episodes of his television series, Jack Hanna's Into the Wild, one of which (Season 13, Episode 7) is titled The Elephant Whisperer.

== Reviews ==
The book has been reviewed several times by journals.

Anthony has made a difference in the lives of many magnificent animals who would otherwise have been lost to the world. When you are feeling down and out and ready to give up, read this inspiring book and share it widely with others.

—Marc Bekoff, author of The Emotional Lives of Animals.

In my thirty five years studying man/animal communication I have met only a few individuals who have the ability to enter into the metaphysical realm of the exotic animal. Lawrence Anthony has been there and back. The Elephant Whisperer is a true reflection of his ability to be at one with the pachyderms.

—Ralph Helfer, author of Modoc.

A lovingly written tale of close encounters, some beautiful, some frightening, with humans and non humans alike. Anthony’s story of his trials and tribulations in preserving a herd of African elephants is a parable.

—Irene M. Pepperberg, author of Alex and Me.
